= Pilot (Will & Grace) =

Pilot episode of Will & Grace

- Will & Grace episode
- Scene where Will (Eric McCormack) and Grace (Debra Messing) went out drinking to celebrate their friendship.
- Episode no.: Season 1 Episode 1
- Directed by: James Burrows
- Written by: David Kohan; Max Mutchnick
- Original air date: September 21, 1998

Episode chronology
← Previous —	Next → "A New Lease on Life"
- Will & Grace season 1

"Pilot" (also known as "Love and Marriage") is the pilot episode, as well as first episode of the first season, of the American television sitcom Will & Grace. It was written by David Kohan and Max Mutchnick, and directed by James Burrows. It originally aired on NBC in the United States on September 21, 1998. In the episode, Grace Adler receives an unexpected marriage proposal from her boyfriend. Her gay best friend Will Truman tries to support her, but finally tells her that she is making a big mistake, even though he risks losing their friendship. The situation gets complicated when Grace's socialite assistant, Karen Walker, and Will's flamboyantly gay friend, Jack McFarland, interfere.

Kohan and Mutchnick based the show on their own lives; for example, Mutchnick, who is openly gay, based the relationship between Will and Grace on his real-life relationship with a woman named Janet. When the pilot was pitched to NBC, the network was positive about the project. There was still some concern, however, that the homosexual subject matter would cause alarm, since the sitcom Ellen was canceled because ratings had plummeted after the show became "too gay". Since airing, the pilot episode of Will & Grace has received mostly positive reviews from television critics. It acquired a Nielsen rating of 8.6, equivalent to approximately 8.4 million viewing households.

== Plot ==
The episode begins with gay lawyer Will Truman (Eric McCormack) talking on the phone with his best friend, heterosexual Jewish interior designer Grace Adler (Debra Messing), about their lives. The following day, Will hosts a poker game at his apartment with his friends, when Grace arrives and informs Will she just had an argument with her long-term boyfriend, Danny. After the game is over, Will insists that Grace spend the night—much to the displeasure of Will's flamboyantly gay friend, Jack McFarland (Sean Hayes), who was planning to move in with Will temporarily.

Later at her office, Grace Adler Designs, Grace tells her socialite assistant Karen Walker (Megan Mullally) about her argument with Danny. Karen tells Grace to make up with him, explaining to Grace that Danny is a "good catch". After staying another night with Will, Grace decides to end her relationship with Danny. However, when she tries to end things she receives an unexpected marriage proposal from him, which she accepts. After the proposal, Grace goes to Will's apartment and asks for his blessing. Will attempts to be supportive of her decision, but finally tells her that Danny is not right for her. Grace informs Will that she does not need his blessing, and that she is going to marry Danny regardless.

Will shows up at Grace Adler Designs the following day to apologize. Karen reveals to Will that Grace has gone to City Hall to get married. However, Grace shows up at her office and informs Will that she left Danny at the altar. Will takes Grace out for a drink and reassures her that she will find someone eventually.

== Production ==
=== Conception ===
Will & Grace creators Max Mutchnick and David Kohan based the show on their own lives. Mutchnick, who is openly gay, based the relationship between Will and Grace on his real-life relationship with a woman named Janet. Originally, Mutchnick and Kohan first went to the National Broadcasting Company (NBC), who told them to create a television series about a new young love story, as Mad About You was going off the air. The character of Will was part of a sitcom Mutchnick and Kohan first pitched to NBC executives in 1997. The original concept was an ensemble comedy featuring three couples, one of which was a gay man living with a straight woman. Warren Littlefield, the executive vice president of NBC at the time, was not excited about the first two couples, but wanted to learn more about the gay and straight couple, so Mutchnick and Kohan was sent to create a pilot script centering on those two characters. NBC went to sitcom director James Burrows to see what he thought of the homosexual subject matter and if an audience would be interested in the show. Burrows liked the idea and when he first read the script in November 1997, he decided that he wanted to direct it. Burrows said, "I knew that the boys had captured a genre and a group of characters I have never read before." The filming of the pilot began in March 1998. The actors who played Will and Grace, Eric McCormack and Debra Messing, were positive about the series and they thought it had the potential to last on television. McCormack said, "When shooting was finished that night, Debra and I were sitting on the couch and looking at each other and I said, ‘We’re gonna be on this set for a while.’ And we sort of clasped hands, but we didn’t want to say anything beyond that and jinx it."

NBC were positive about the project, but there was still some concern that the homosexual subject matter would cause alarm. Ellen DeGeneres' sitcom Ellen that aired on ABC was canceled the year before Will & Grace premiered because ratings had plummeted after the show became "too gay". Despite the criticism ABC received for DeGeneres' coming out episode, "The Puppy Episode", "there's no question that show made it easier for Will & Grace to make it on the air," said Kohan. He added, "Will & Grace had a better shot at succeeding where Ellen failed, however, because Will has known about his homosexuality for twenty years. He's not exploring that awkward territory for the first time as Ellen did. The process of self-discovery and the pain most gay men go through is fascinating, but the average American is put off by it." Kohan also commented that rather than concentrating on Will's sexuality, Will & Grace is using it as a device: "It's like that When Harry Met Sally... line when Billy Crystal says, 'A man and woman can never be friends, because sex always gets in the way.' What we want to explore is what happens between a man and a woman when sex doesn't get in the way."

=== Cast and characters ===
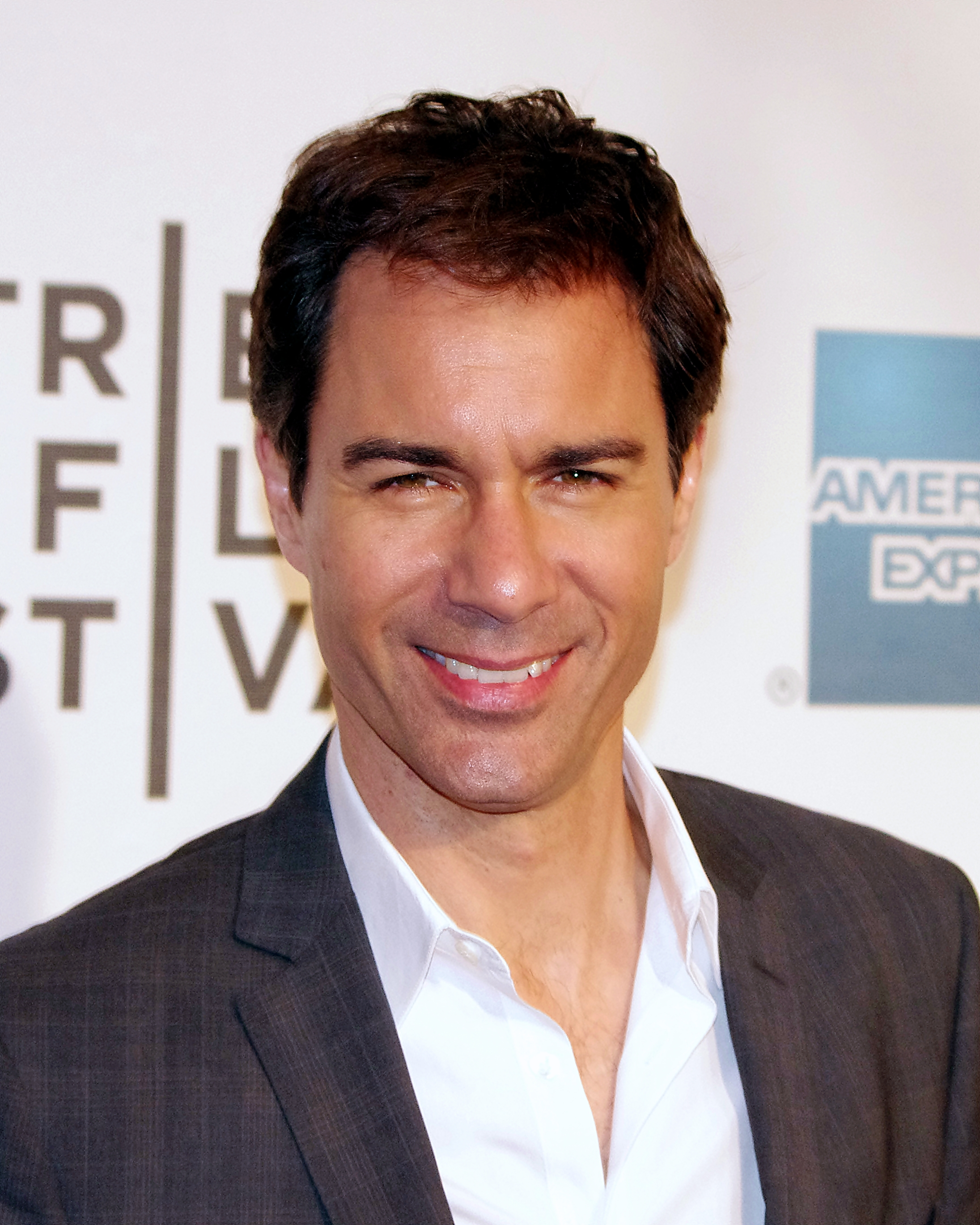
Eric McCormack was the first actor cast in the series.

Mutchnick said Will was originally going to be named Will Herman ("her man") because the staff wanted to use names that "speak exactly to the essence" of the characters. However, they changed it to Truman ("true man") since they thought it was more accurate, as Will "really lives his life in an honest way". John Barrowman was one of the final candidates for the role of Will, but was rejected because he "wasn't gay enough". The part instead went to Eric McCormack, who revealed that taking the role was not difficult because he liked the concept of a gay show not being about the "issues" of being gay. Having played gay characters several times in his career, McCormack did not have a problem with it and thought his character could become a "poster boy for some gay movement", like DeGeneres became a spokesperson with her character. He explained that when he first read the script, "what hit me immediately was that this was me. I mean, sexual orientation aside, Will was so much like me. He's a great host, he's relatively funny and he has great friends and he's a good friend to them ... the gay issue just wasn't really a big thing." McCormack was also the first actor to be cast. In response to the relationship between Will and Grace, McCormack said that gay men and straight women have "more fun than anybody" in their relationships; "Straight guys like me are jealous because of how much fun they have. We can show the audience part of that."

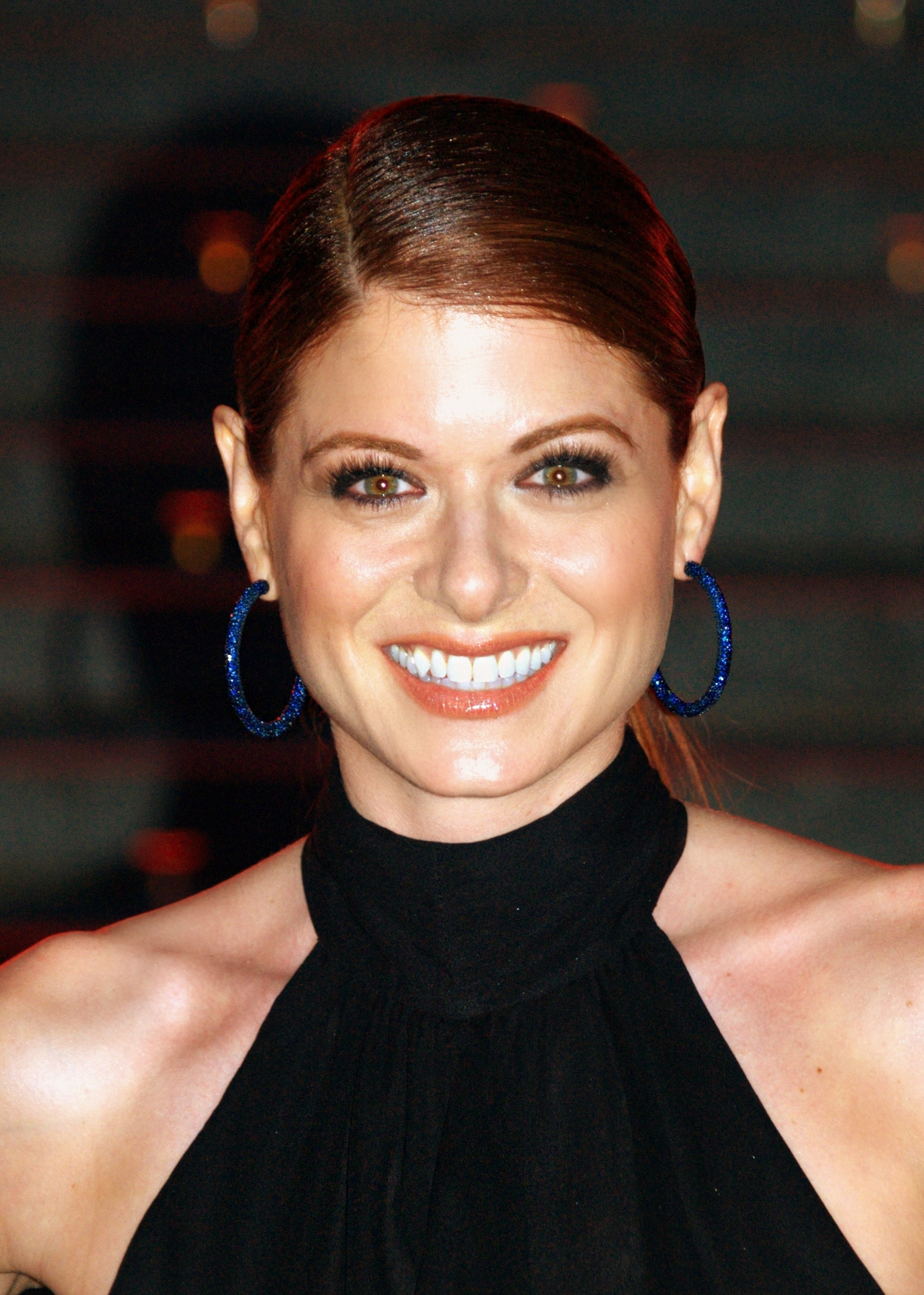
Initially, Debra Messing was not sure if she wanted to play the role of Grace.

Mutchnick, in regards of Debra Messing's character, said: "Grace doesn't fall into any of those categories that have stereotyped Jewish women. She's strong, she's pretty and she's a proud Jewish woman." Mutchnick revealed that Nicollette Sheridan was originally brought in to read the part of Grace, but even though she did a "great job", her performance was "too desperate". Mutchnick and Kohan decided to cast Messing in the role instead, who at the time was starring in ABC's drama Prey. After her first meeting with them, Messing was not convinced she wanted the role. Messing revealed that Mutchnick and Kohan showed up at her home with a bottle of vodka; "They poured me several shots, we spoke for several hours and they pitched me the show. I'm a lightweight. I didn't need much to be a little giddy. By the end of the evening, they said, 'Will you do it?' I said, 'Let's talk tomorrow.'" They called her the next day to inform her that they "loved her" and asked "if she'd made up her mind". Messing still did not make her mind up. However, the following day, she called Mutchnick and Kohan and accepted the role. In discussion of the character, Messing said: "I have a lot more confidence and I'm much more relaxed. I feel comfortable that Grace will be a character I'll enjoy doing for a long time." She later, however, admitted that director Burrows was the reason for doing Will & Grace. Messing was the last actor to be cast.

Sean Hayes was cast in the role of Jack. When an NBC casting executive saw Hayes's role in the indie gay romance film Billy's Hollywood Screen Kiss, he sent the script to Hayes, who was attending the 1997 Sundance Film Festival in Utah. Even though Hayes enjoyed the script when he read it, he threw it away as he did not want to spend money on a plane ticket to Los Angeles for the audition. However, a few weeks later when Hayes was in Los Angeles, he was sent the script again and decided to try out for the audition. If asked if he regrets accepting the role, Hayes said: "If you're truly an actor, in the long run ... I don't know that I would have done it either. I think of all the things that I still want to do, and I don't know if I'll get to do them." However, he admits that he "love[s]" the idea that people assume that he is either gay or straight. In an interview with Entertainment Weekly, Hayes admitted that people believe he is Jack "24 hours a day".

Before Megan Mullally was given the role of Karen, she had previously been cast as a series regular on sitcoms such as The Ellen Burstyn Show, My Life and Times, and Rachel Gunn. Mullally guest starred on many other shows, including Ned and Stacey, on which she first worked with Messing. Mullally informed her agent that she did not want to do any more sitcoms or auditions for sitcoms, during the time that Will & Grace came around. "Because my feeling was, like, Look, I've done it. It's not clicking. It's not for me. But he [her agent] was always arguing the point that the right thing hadn't come along yet." She initially auditioned for the role of Grace, but admitted that she did not want to audition for the part of Karen. When asked about Karen's voice, Mullally revealed that the voice was an "instinctive thing". She also said, "...I think it was just a feeling that I had that it would be better for the pace of the show and it would be funnier in some way, but I didn't know why. Karen has a lot of joy, even when she's in a bad mood. She's pretty much happy with who she is, and that is something I think is a great thing to play, because the character of Karen could have been very unlikeable, and I think she's likeable because she has joy and she can be very childlike."

== Reception ==
The problem with Ellen wasn't the fact that its star was gay. Most of the country has gotten over prejudice about that. The real issue was that, in its earnest zeal to be a crusader, the show lost the will to be funny. NBC and the industry will pay close interest to Will & Grace as a new and perhaps better test of the public's acceptance of gay characters.

— Brian Lambert,
St. Paul Pioneer Press

The episode was first broadcast in the United States on NBC on Monday, September 21, 1998, in the 9:30–10 p.m. (PST) timeslot. In its original American broadcast, the pilot tied with Working for forty-first place in ratings for the week of September 21–27, 1998. With a Nielsen rating of 8.6, equivalent to approximately 8.4 million viewing households, it was the fifteenth-highest-rated show on NBC the week it aired. Since airing, the episode has received mostly positive reviews from television critics. Joyce Millman of Salon Entertainment said the episode has "glimmers of class" and the jokes are "relatively sophisticated". John Carman of the San Francisco Chronicle commented that Burrows's direction was "sharp as usual" and the writing was "above average". Brian Lambert of the St. Paul Pioneer Press said the pilot was "nicely staged by veteran director Jimmy Burrows, and coming from a couple producers, Max Mutchnick and David Cohan, who assisted Boston Common and Dream On, the show – which is to say the pilot episode (everything could go to hell next week) – has the best verbal interplay of any of the season's new sitcoms." William Horn from the Gay & Lesbian Alliance Against Defamation (GLAAD) thought the episode was a "wonderful" representation of a gay man's life "regardless of whether he's in a relationship in that very moment. I think it's important that American audiences realize that lesbians and gay men are not simply all about sexual situations." Ellen Gray of the Chicago Tribune was also positive about the show: "For those who believe that Hollywood's engaging in a conspiracy to 'normalize' a sexual orientation that many Americans still find abhorrent, Will & Grace will look like a candy-coated poison pill. To those who think that Hollywood isn't moving fast enough in offering sexual parity for gays, it may just look like poison. But... there's a large audience out there that's somewhere in the mushy middle, an audience that might be ready to embrace Will & Grace."

The actors' performances were praised by several critics. Carman thought McCormack and Messing worked "nicely" together, and called the supporting cast "an asset". Kay Mcfadden of the Seattle Times also praised McCormack, Messing and the supporting cast as "very funny". Robert Laurence of The San Diego Union-Tribune wrote: "Messing and McCormack play wonderfully together, tossing lines back and forth as if they'd been at it for years, making their relationship quite believable. Sean Hayes, as the flamboyantly gay Jack, adds to the mix. Jack is flighty, temperamental, good-humored and highly likable." A reviewer for USA Today said he thought it would be nice to see Will have a "full life of his own", and not just serve as a "love-life adviser" to Grace and Jack. "I know it won't happen soon; NBC is so skittish about the so-called Ellen 'gay show' stigma, it's gone to Herculean lengths to avoid mentioning Will's sexuality. But a grace period can only last so long."

The episode received less positive reviews as well. Rahul Gairola of PopMatters wrote that while "the pilot lays the usual groundwork by showing how the characters' lives are intertwined, it also demonstrates immediately the sitcom's major drawback, that the stereotypical gay character is the stand-out comic figure." A reviewer for the Los Angeles Times said "there's something not quite right about this show's approach to homosexuality... It has everything to do with Will's attitude. It approaches asexual, his gayness appearing to exist solely as a device to give him the moral authority to repeatedly ridicule the mincing manner of his bandanna-wearing homosexual friend, Jack, without being labeled homophobic." Suite101.com's Hana Lewis thought it was "regrettable" that the pilot's jokes revolved "solely around gay stereotypes and sexual innuendo". Some reviewers were also skeptical about the future of the show. One such review said, "If Will & Grace can somehow survive a brutal time period opposite football and Ally McBeal, it could grow into a reasonably entertaining little anomaly — that is, a series about a man and a woman who have no sexual interest in one another. But don't bet on it. If it's a doomed relationships viewers want, they'll probably opt for Ally."
