= Nathan Lee Graham =

American actor and singer

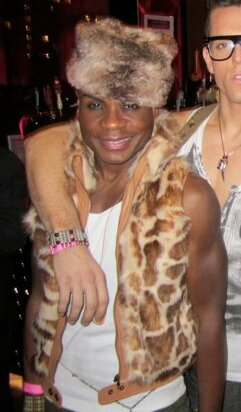
- Nathan Lee Graham attending the Michael Musto 25th anniversary party in NYC
- Born: St. Louis, Missouri, U.S.
- Occupations: Actor, singer
- Years active: 2000–present

Nathan Lee Graham is an American actor and singer. He is known for film roles such as Zoolander and Theater Camp and stage roles such as The Wild Party and Priscilla, Queen of the Desert.

== Early life and career ==
Graham is a graduate of Webster University in St. Louis, Missouri.

Graham is best known for his roles in the films Zoolander, Zoolander 2, Sweet Home Alabama, Hitch, and Theater Camp. On television, he has appeared in The Comeback, Scrubs, Absolutely Fabulous, Law & Order: Special Victims Unit, Broad City, and as Bernard in the Fox comedy LA to Vegas. He also appeared as François on the CW Riverdale spin-off Katy Keene and as Draque Noir on the Hulu series Woke.

His stage appearances include the original Broadway casts of the Tony Award and Grammy Award-nominated The Wild Party and in the original Broadway cast of the Tony Award-nominated Priscilla, Queen of the Desert. Graham received a 2017 Lucille Lortel Award nomination for Outstanding Featured Actor in a Musical for The View UpStairs. In 2016, he received the IRNE Award for Best Supporting Actor in a Play for The Colored Museum. Graham also received a Drama League Award nomination for the role of Rey-Rey in the off-Broadway production of Tarell Alvin McCraney's Wig Out. Graham also won a Los Angeles Drama Critics Circle Award for Best Featured Performer in a Musical for the Los Angeles premiere of The Wild Party in 2005. In 2005, he earned a Best Classical Album Grammy Award for Songs of Innocence and of Experience as a soloist. In 2022, he played Hermes in the North American tour of the musical Hadestown.

Graham won the José Esteban Muñoz Award from CLAGS: The Center for LGBTQ Studies at the Graduate Center, CUNY in 2017, recognizing his activism promoting queer studies outside of academia.

In 2025, it was announced that Max Mutchnick and David Kohan had created a Golden Girls–like TV series entitled Mid-Century Modern with Graham, Matt Bomer, Nathan Lane and Linda Lavin. In June 2025, Graham was awarded the Vanguard Award at the Critics Choice Association's Celebration of LGBTQ+ Cinema and Television.

== Personal life ==
Graham is "a very proud Black gay man."

== Filmography ==
=== Film ===
Year	Title	Role	Notes
2001	Zoolander	Todd	
2002	Sweet Home Alabama	Frederick Montana	
2005	Hitch	Geoff	
2005	Confessions of an Action Star	Glen Jefferies	
2009	Friends of Dorothy	Maurice	Short film
2011	Trophy Kids	Barcelona	
2011	Bad Actress	Cassandra / Dave Gilner	
2012	Migraine	Carl	Short film
2016	Zoolander 2	Todd	
2023	Theater Camp	Clive DeWitt	
2026	Influenced	Connor	
2027	Romy and Michele 2	TBA	Filming

=== Television ===
Year	Title	Role	Notes
2002	Absolutely Fabulous	Assistant at 'GUFF'	Episode: "Gay"
2004	Quintuplets	Marcello	Episode: "Bob and Carol Save Christmas"
2005	The Comeback	Peter	6 episodes
2006	Scrubs	Eric / Devin	Episode: "My Cabbage"
2008	The More Things Change...	Manny	TV movie
2010–2013	Law & Order: Special Victims Unit	Gallery Owner / A.D.A. Franklin	2 episodes
2015	Hug-O-Gram	Mark Rhyne	6 episodes
2015	Connection Unavailable	Michael C. Overton	Episode: "Big-Deal Kind of People"
2018	LA to Vegas	Bernard	Main role; 15 episodes
2019	Indoor Boys	Edwin	Episode: "Book Club"
2019	Broad City	Unnamed role	Episode: "Shenanigans"
2020	Katy Keene	François	10 episodes
2020–2022	Woke	Darque Noir	2 episodes
2024	Does This Murder Make Me Look Gay?!	Henry Jacobs	8 episodes
2025	Mid-Century Modern	Arthur Broussard	Main role; 10 episodes
2026	Elsbeth	Jolly	Episode: "That's All"
