= Steve Zuckerman =

American television and theater director

- Born: Stephen Edward Zuckerman; New York City, New York, U.S.
- Education: University of Michigan, Ann Arbor (BA); Yale University (MFA)
- Occupation(s): Television and theater director
- Years active: 1979–2016
- Known for: Directing Nuts by Tom Topor on Broadway, 400 episodes of prime time Television

Stephen Edward "Steve" Zuckerman is an American television and theater director. He began his career in the theater. After being trained at the University of Michigan and the Yale School of Drama, he went on to be the Associate Artistic Director of the IRT Theater where he directed celebrated productions of Odets "Clash By Night" and Ibsen's "Brand" among many others. He was Director of Play Development at the Circle in the Square Theater and the Associate Artistic Director of the WPA Theater where he directed the premiere of Nuts which moved directly to Broadway and received two Tony Nominations and two Drama Desk Nominations.

Since 1987, he has amassed a number television credits including Full House, The Golden Girls, Murphy Brown, Empty Nest, Friends, The Drew Carey Show, Everybody Loves Raymond, Zoey 101, According to Jim, Melissa & Joey, Anger Management and among other series.

== Filmography ==
Year	Title	Contribution	Notes
Year	Title	Director	Notes
1987	Throb	Yes	1 episode, credited as Stephen Zuckerman
1987	Pursuit of Happiness	Yes	1 episode
1988	Mr. President	Yes	1 episode
1988	Amen	Yes	1 episode
1988	Full House	Yes	1 episode
1988	Duet	Yes	1 episode
1988	Valerie	Yes	2 episodes
1988	My Sister Sam	Yes	2 episodes
1989	The Golden Girls	Yes	1 episode
1987-1989	It's a Living	Yes	15 episodes
1989	Heartland	Yes	4 episodes
1990	Singer & Sons	Yes	2 episodes
1990	The Fanelli Boys	Yes	
1993	Shaky Ground	Yes	1 episode
1994	The George Carlin Show	Yes	1 episode
1989-1995	Empty Nest	Yes	127 episodes
1995	Hope & Gloria	Yes	4 episodes
1995	The Crew	Yes	4 episodes
1996	The Show	Yes	2 episodes
1995-1996	New York Daze	Yes	12 episodes
1996	Party Girl	Yes	2 episodes
1996	Friends	Yes	2 episodes
1997	North Shore Fish	Yes	
1997	Life with Roger	Yes	2 episodes
1997	Chicago Sons	Yes	2 episodes
1996-1997	Suddenly Susan	Yes	5 episodes
1997	Built to Last	Yes	2 episodes
1997	World on a String	Yes	TV movie
1998	Working	Yes	1 episode
1997-1998	Murphy Brown	Yes	11 episodes
1995-1999	The Drew Carey Show	Yes	12 episodes
1999	Katie Joplin	Yes	3 episodes
1999	The Jamie Foxx Show	Yes	6 episodes
1999	Grown Ups	Yes	2 episodes
1999	Oh, Grow Up	Yes	1 episode
2000	Daddio	Yes	1 episode
1998-2000	Everybody Loves Raymond	Yes	13 episodes
2000	Hey Neighbor	Yes	TV movie
1999-2001	The Norm Show	Yes	14 episodes
2000-2001	Nikki	Yes	6 episodes
1998-2002	The Hughleys	Yes	23 episodes
2002	Girlfriends	Yes	1 episode
2002	Three Sisters	Yes	2 episodes
2002-2003	The In-Laws	Yes	6 episodes
2003	A.U.S.A.	Yes	3 episodes
2003-2004	It's All Relative	Yes	4 episodes
2002-2004	Good Morning, Miami	Yes	12 episodes
2004	The Stones	Yes	1 episode
2004	Quintuplets	Yes	2 episodes
2005	Committed	Yes	3 episodes
2005	Zoey 101	Yes	1 episode
2005	Living with Fran	Yes	3 episodes
2005-2006	All of Us	Yes	2 episodes
2003-2006	What I Like About You	Yes	15 episodes
2005-2006	Love, Inc.	Yes	8 episodes
2009	Hannah Montana	Yes	1 episode
2005-2009	According to Jim	Yes	11 episode
2009	Ruby & the Rockits	Yes	1 episode
2011	$#*! My Dad Says	Yes	3 episodes
2011	I'm in the Band	Yes	1 episode
2011	Working Class	Yes	3 episodes
2011	State of Georgia	Yes	3 episodes
2012	I Hate My Teenage Daughter	Yes	3 episodes
2012	Happily Divorced	Yes	2 episodes
2010-2012	Melissa & Joey	Yes	9 episodes
2012	Whitney	Yes	1 episode
2013	Men At Work	Yes	2 episodes
2014	Undateable	Yes	1 episode
2014	Partners	Yes	2 episodes
2013-2014	Instant Mom	Yes	2 episodes
2013-2014	Anger Management	Yes	11 episodes
2015	Ground Floor	Yes	1 episode
2016	2 Broke Girls	Yes	2 episodes
Taken from IMDb.
