= Buz Kohan =

American screenwriter (born 1933)

- Born: Alan W. Kohan; August 9, 1933 (age 92); Bronx, New York City, U.S.
- Occupations: Television writer, record producer, composer, screenwriter
- Years active: 1963–2008
- Spouse: Rhea Arnold (m. 1962)
- Children: 3, including David and Jenji
- Parent(s): Charles Kohan; May Kohan

Alan "Buz" Kohan (born August 9, 1933) is an American television writer, producer and composer.

== Early life ==
Kohan was born to a Jewish family in the Bronx, New York City, the son of Charles (b. 1902) and May Kohan. His father was in the leotard business and his mother was a housewife.

== Career ==
Kohan studied at the University of Rochester's Eastman School of Music, earning bachelor's and master's degrees in 1955 and 1956, respectively. After working in New York, in 1967, he was offered work on The Carol Burnett Show, relocating to Los Angeles.

As a television producer, he produced many television specials, including Bing Crosby's Christmas Show (1970), Perry Como's Winter Show (1971), Bing Crosby and the Sounds of Christmas (1971), The Arthur Godfrey Special (1972), The Keane Brothers Show, Gene Kelly: An American in Pasadena (1978), and Shirley MacLaine: Illusions (1982).

As a writer, he wrote special material for Night of One Hundred Stars, produced at Radio City Music Hall, New York City in 1982, and also (with Marvin Hamlisch, Christopher Adler, and Larry Grossman) Shirley MacLaine on Broadway, produced at Gershwin Theatre, New York City, in 1984. He wrote songs with (and for) his dear friend singer-entertainer Michael Jackson, such as "You Were There" (a tribute to Sammy Davis Jr. sung by Jackson), "Gone Too Soon" (written during the early '80s, recorded later for Jackson's Dangerous album released in 1991 as a tribute to Ryan White), "Scared of the Moon" (a rare song from 1984, sung by Michael Jackson, released in 2004 by Sony Music), and "Make a Wish," a never-heard song written by Kohan and sung by Jackson, for the Steven Spielberg version of Peter Pan, Hook. He also co-wrote the Christmas classic "Peace on Earth/Little Drummer Boy" for David Bowie and Bing Crosby.

== Personal life ==
Kohan met his wife Rhea Arnold when she was working in Lake George, New York. They married on July 17, 1962, and they have three children together: Jono, David Kohan (who are twins), and Jenji Kohan. As Rhea Kohan, his wife has published the novels Save Me a Seat (Harper & Row, 1979) and Hand-Me-Downs (Random House, 1980).

He and his children David and Jenji have all won Emmys, making them one of just 15 families with parents and children who have won.
