= Do Not Disturb (TV series) =

2008 American television sitcom

- Also known as: The Inn
- Genre: Sitcom
- Created by: Abraham Higginbotham
- Developed by: Paul Young; Peter Principato
- Starring: Jerry O'Connell; Jesse Tyler Ferguson; Jolene Purdy; Molly Stanton; Dave Franco; Niecy Nash
- Composer: Paul Buckley
- Country of origin: United States
- Original language: English
- No. of seasons: 1
- No. of episodes: 7 (4 unaired)

Production
- Executive producers: Brian Dobbins; Carolyn Bernstein; Howard T. Owens; Paul Young; Peter Principato
- Production locations: 20th Century Fox Studios, Los Angeles, California
- Camera setup: Multi-camera
- Running time: 30 minutes
- Production companies: Broken Good Productions; Principato-Young Entertainment; Reveille Productions; 20th Century Fox Television

Original release
- Network: Fox
- Release: September 10 – September 24, 2008

Do Not Disturb (previously known as The Inn) is an American sitcom that premiered on Fox on September 10, 2008. The multi-camera series was co-produced through Reveille Productions, Principato-Young Entertainment, and 20th Century Fox Television. On September 24, 2008, Fox cancelled the series after three episodes aired with the remaining four episodes left unaired.

== Synopsis ==
Do Not Disturb focuses on the going-ons at a once-popular New York City hotel as seen through the eyes of its employees. Fox ordered 13 episodes, with Jason Bateman directing the pilot.

After three episodes aired, the show was rumored to be cancelled on September 23, 2008. Fox officially cancelled the sitcom the following day, making it the first cancellation of the 2008–09 season.

== Cast ==
- Niecy Nash as Rhonda Peet
- Jerry O'Connell as Neal Danner
- Molly Stanton as Nicole
- Jesse Tyler Ferguson as Larry
- Jolene Purdy as Molly Poleski
- Dave Franco as Gus

== Episodes ==
No.	Title	Directed by	Written by	Original release date	Prod. code	U.S. viewers (millions)
1	"Pilot"	Jason Bateman	Abraham Higginbotham	September 10, 2008	1APT01	4.650
An article about the sexual exploits of the staff of The Inn while on the job is run at a local New York magazine, causing Rhonda to take action and Neal to try to act on his best behavior. Meanwhile, Molly helps Nicole with her modeling career, and Gus helps Larry with his love life.
2	"Birdcage"	Gary Halvorson	John Quaintance	September 17, 2008	1APT02	3.900
Neal installs a human-sized birdcage in the bar of the Inn to put his top-notch female staff on display; Nicole has a meltdown when Neal doesn't ask her to work a shift in the birdcage; Audrina Patridge tries to check in.
3	"Dosing"	Gary Halvorson	Sally Bradford	September 24, 2008	1APT03	3.580
The staff of The Inn is on their best behavior when they find out it's time for them to be evaluated to see if they deserve bonuses or not. Meanwhile, Rhonda is upset when Neal fires a bartender for no good reason. Their arguing delays the evaluations and causes one of the staff members to go to great lengths in an effort to resolve the conflict between Rhonda and Neal so everyone's bonuses can be handed out. To make things worse the owner of the inn and his wife stop by for a weekend visit.
4	"Work Sex"	Jason Bateman	Abraham Higginbotham	Unaired	1APT79	TBA
Neal jumps at the chance of being the face of the hotel when the Inn is named one of New York's hippest hotels, by a top New York newspaper.
5	"Satisfaction"	Bob Koherr	Prentice Penny	Unaired	1APT04	TBA
A high-maintenance hotel client checks into The Inn and tries the patience of Nicole, Larry and Gus. The staff must do their best to bite their tongues despite the guest's discourteous antics, and Nicole, already on probation for bad behavior, plots to strike back at the snarky guest. Meanwhile, Rhonda is fed up with her recently divorced friend taking over her apartment, and when Neal takes an interest in her, Rhonda attempts to keep the flame going by telling Neal her friend was underwhelmed with Neal's performance in bed and he should work on improving.
6	"Sorry Charlie"	Bob Koherr	Sally Bradford and Kirk J. Rudell	Unaired	1APT05	TBA
7	"Break Room"	Rob Schiller	Kirk J. Rudell	Unaired	1APT06	TBA

== U.S. Nielsen ratings ==
#	Episode	Air Date	Timeslot (EST)	Season	Rating	Share	18–49 (Rating/Share)	Viewers (m)	Weekly Rank (#)
1	"Work Sex"	September 10, 2008	Wednesday; 9:30 P.M.	2008–2009			1.9/5	4.65	
2	"Birdcage"	September 17, 2008	Wednesday; 9:30 P.M.	2008–2009	TBA	TBA	1.6	4.13	TBA
3	"Dosing"	September 24, 2008	Wednesday; 9:30 P.M.	2008–2009	TBA	TBA	1.4/3	3.53	TBA
