= The Stones (TV series) =

- Genre: Sitcom
- Created by: Jenji Kohan
- Starring: Robert Klein; Judith Light; Lindsay Sloane; Jay Baruchel
- Composers: Jonathan Wolff; Chris Alan Lee
- Country of origin: United States
- Original language: English
- No. of seasons: 1
- No. of episodes: 10

Production
- Running time: 30 minutes
- Production companies: KoMut Entertainment; Warner Bros. Television

Original release
- Network: CBS
- Release: March 17 – March 31, 2004

The Stones is an American sitcom television series that starred Robert Klein, Judith Light, Lindsay Sloane and Jay Baruchel as the Stone family that are divorced but still live under the same roof. The show premiered on CBS on March 17, 2004 and was canceled after three episodes had aired. It was produced by David Kohan, Max Mutchnick and Jenji Kohan.

== Cast ==
- Robert Klein as Stan Stone, the patriarch of the Stone family, Barbara's husband and Karly and Winston's father.
- Judith Light as Barbara Stone, the matriarch of the family, Stan's wife and Karly and Winston's mother.
- Lindsay Sloane as Karly Stone, Stan and Barbara's daughter and Winston's older sister.
- Jay Baruchel as Winston Stone, Stan and Barbara's son and Karly's younger brother.

== Episodes ==
No.	Title	Directed by	Written by	Original release date	Prod. code
1	"Pilot"	James Burrows	Jenji Kohan	March 17, 2004	177251
2	"Seamus on You"	James Burrows	Jenji Kohan	March 24, 2004	177253
3	"The Lawyer Trap"	Steve Zuckerman	Barry Wernick	March 31, 2004	177252
4	"The Lonely Goatherd"	N/A	Linda Wallem	Unaired	177254
5	"Romancing the Stones"	N/A	Elaine Aronson	Unaired	177255
6	"She Ain't Heavy, She's My Sister"	Lee Shallat Chemel	Barry Langer	Unaired	177256
7	"The Perfect Episode"	N/A	Matthew Salsberg	Unaired	177257
8	"Courting the Coopers"	N/A	Kristofor Brown	Unaired	177258
9	"Howard's End"	N/A	Katy Ballard	Unaired	177259
10	"The Road Not Taken"	N/A	Jennifer Konner & Alexandra Rushfield	Unaired	177260

== Response ==
Robert Bianco of USA Today gave it 1.5 stars out of four. "This barrage of sullen sex jokes are a family affair in more ways than one." The New York Times said "The Stones ultimately misses the potential in the clash of idioms it establishes "
