= Twins (TV series) =

- Genre: Sitcom
- Created by: David Kohan; Max Mutchnick
- Starring: Sara Gilbert; Molly Stanton; Melanie Griffith; Mark Linn-Baker
- Composer: Jack Diamond
- Country of origin: United States
- Original language: English
- No. of seasons: 1
- No. of episodes: 18

Production
- Running time: 22 minutes
- Production companies: KoMut Entertainment; Warner Bros. Television

Original release
- Network: The WB
- Release: September 16, 2005 – March 3, 2006

Twins is an American television sitcom that first aired on The WB in the United States and on CTV in Canada from September 16, 2005, to March 3, 2006. The series was produced by KoMut Entertainment in association with Warner Bros. Television. The show was cancelled on May 18, 2006, unchosen to move onto The CW following the merger of The WB and UPN.

== Synopsis ==
The show stars Sara Gilbert and Molly Stanton as sisters Mitchee and Farrah Arnold, who have taken over their parents' business. Together they make decisions about the future of their company while being supported by their father Alan and their overly plastic-surgeried mother Lee. The show's humor revolved around the differences between the nerdy Mitchee and the sexy Farrah.

The theme song for the show was "Sister Sister", performed by OK Go.

== Cast ==
- Sara Gilbert as Mitchee Arnold
- Molly Stanton as Farrah Arnold
- Chris Fitzgerald as Neil
- Melanie Griffith as Lee Arnold
- Steve Braun as Jordan
- Mark Linn-Baker as Alan Arnold

== Episodes ==
No.	Title	Directed by	Written by	Original release date	US viewers (millions)
1	"Pilot"	James Widdoes	David Kohan & Max Mutchnick	September 16, 2005	3.32
The sisters inherit their parents' lingerie company.
2	"Fruit of the Lunatics"	James Widdoes	Dana Klein	September 23, 2005	2.49
3	"Treat Her Like a Lady"	James Widdoes	Chris Kelly	September 30, 2005	2.24
4	"Twist of Fate"	James Widdoes	Larry Reitzer	October 7, 2005	2.47
5	"Really, It's the Thought That Counts"	James Widdoes	Wendy Goldman	October 14, 2005	2.21
6	"Model Student"	James Widdoes	Adam Lorenzo	October 21, 2005	2.49
Mitchee and Farrah both receive traffic tickets and must attend traffic school at their old alma mater.
7	"Halloween Boo"	James Widdoes	Mike Sikowitz	October 28, 2005	3.04
Mitchee and Lee bond as they give out Halloween candy while Alan tries to catch the person that has been egging their house.
8	"Horse Sense"	James Widdoes	Daisy Gardner	November 4, 2005	2.87
Farrah’s plan to flirt with the company’s landlord to keep the rent low falls apart when she finds out that he recently retired and has been replaced by his daughter.
9	"I Love You, You're Fired"	James Widdoes	Barry Wernick	November 11, 2005	2.48
Jordan finally asks Mitchee out on a date, however there’s a big problem with the shipment because of Jordan’s actions.
10	"Sister's Keeper"	James Widdoes	Christopher Vane	November 18, 2005	2.62
When Alan informs Lee, Mitchee and Farrah that his unexciting sister is joining them for Thanksgiving dinner, the family is less than thrilled.
11	"Musical Chairs"	James Widdoes	Wendy Goldman	December 9, 2005	2.84
12	"Blonde Ambition"	James Widdoes	Dana Klein	January 13, 2006	2.96
13	"Dancin' & Pantsin'"	James Widdoes	Hillel Abrams	January 20, 2006	2.76
14	"Sneaks and Geeks"	James Widdoes	Wendy Goldman	January 27, 2006	3.09
15	"When I Move, You Move"	James Widdoes	Chris Kelly	February 3, 2006	2.65
16	"Housing Crisis"	James Widdoes	Mike Sikowitz	February 17, 2006	2.26
17	"Himbo"	James Widdoes	Christopher Vane	February 24, 2006	3.00
18	"Blast from the Past"	James Widdoes	Barry Wernick	March 3, 2006	2.94
