= Mid-Century Modern (TV series) =

2025 American comedy television series

- Genre: Comedy
- Created by: Max Mutchnick; David Kohan
- Directed by: James Burrows
- Starring: Nathan Lane; Matt Bomer; Linda Lavin; Nathan Lee Graham
- Country of origin: United States
- Original language: English
- No. of seasons: 1
- No. of episodes: 10

Production
- Executive producers: Max Mutchnick; David Kohan; James Burrows; Nathan Lane; Matt Bomer; Ryan Murphy
- Camera setup: Multi-camera
- Running time: 21–26 minutes
- Production companies: KoMut Entertainment; Ryan Murphy Television; 20th Television

Original release
- Network: Hulu
- Release: March 28, 2025

Mid-Century Modern is an American television sitcom created by Max Mutchnick and David Kohan. It stars Nathan Lane, Matt Bomer, Linda Lavin, and Nathan Lee Graham. The series marks Lavin's final television role. She died having completed seven episodes, but after her death, it was decided that many of her scenes from the fourth episode would instead be used in the eighth episode, so she appears in a total of eight episodes.

Mid-Century Modern premiered on Hulu on March 28, 2025, and received generally positive reviews from critics. The series has been praised for its humor, nostalgic charm, performances, and its ability to blend classic sitcom sensibilities with contemporary themes. On September 29, 2025, series co-creator Max Mutchnick announced via Instagram that Hulu had decided to cancel the series.

== Premise ==
Three late middle-aged gay friends, after an unexpected death, move in together in Palm Springs, California. Living with the wealthiest friend's mother, they navigate their golden years as a chosen family, supporting each other through life's challenges.

== Cast and characters ==
=== Main ===
- Nathan Lane as Bunny Schneiderman
- Matt Bomer as Jerry Frank
- Nathan Lee Graham as Arthur Broussard
- Linda Lavin as Sybil Schneiderman, Bunny's mother

=== Recurring ===
- Pamela Adlon as Mindy Schneiderman, Bunny's sister
- Richard Kind as Caroll Mintz
- Zane Phillips as Mason

=== Guest ===
- Vanessa Bayer as Liz
- Jesse Tyler Ferguson as Tevin
- Bruno Amato as Sal D'Amico
- Billie Lourd as Becca Frank, Jerry's daughter
- Cheri Oteri as Denise Buckley
- Kim Coles as Yvonne
- Adam Hagenbuch as Bo
- Stephanie Koenig as Penny Newton-Breene
- Rhea Perlman as Judy
- Judd Hirsch as Alan

== Episodes ==
No.	Title	Directed by	Written by	Original release date
1	"Bye, George"	James Burrows	David Kohan & Max Mutchnick	March 28, 2025
After the death of their friend George, Jerry Frank and Arthur Broussard are invited to move into their friend Bunny Schneiderman's Palm Springs home that he shares with his mother Sybil. While the friends are thinking it over, Bunny has a date with a much younger man causing him to rethink the invite. In the end, Arthur and Jerry move into Bunny's home.
2	"Working Girls"	James Burrows	Suzanne Martin	March 28, 2025
Jerry learns that Donny Osmond is performing at a nearby casino. While he waits in line for tickets, Bunny gambles at one of the tables. After he doesn't accidentally hit, he loses money. When the pit boss wants an opportunity to sleep with Jerry, Bunny is sent to try talking Jerry into doing so but he doesn't mention the man to his friend. Meanwhile, Arthur gets a job working for a clothing store under the Schneiderman family business. He is unhappy pushing weird outfits to their customers until he is allowed to speak his mind to the clients.
3	"Turbulence"	James Burrows	Adam Barr	March 28, 2025
When Bunny's sister Mindy comes to town, Jerry and Arthur are out of town. Jerry's long lost daughter Becca is on a flight, seated next to Arthur. After Arthur learns that Becca's mother never gave her any of the gifts he sent, Jerry is upset and is set to tell her the truth. Instead he doesn't say anything, allowing them to bond while Arthur is taking over his work as his co-flight attendant gets drunk. Meanwhile back in Palm Springs, Mindy reveals that she resented not being asked to work for the family business. This results in Bunny asking his sister to try working for the family business.
4	"Never Have I Ever"	James Burrows	Dan Bucatinsky	March 28, 2025
When Bunny, Jerry, and Arthur all test positive for COVID, they quarantine at home. During the quarantine, Bunny, Jerry, and Arthur play Never Have I Ever with cough medicine. During the game, Jerry and Arthur reveal that they hooked up on the beach after George dumped Jerry, upsetting Bunny. Arthur apologizes to his high school girlfriend for lying back in the day, before apologizing to Bunny.
5	"Hello, Fisty's"	James Burrows	David Kohan & Max Mutchnick	March 28, 2025
While returning to Fire Island, Jerry meets another gay closeted Mormon, Mason, causing Jerry to share parts of his story with the man. Mason reveals that he is set to get married in a week, reminding Jerry of his relationship with his daughter. Back at the bar, Arthur bonds with a fan of his. He warns the younger man not to end up like him. Bunny is stuck talking with Caroll (Richard Kind) much to his annoyance before being cheered up by the man. In Palm Springs, someone tries to scam Sybil and is unsuccessful.
6	"Maid Serviced"	James Burrows	Tracy Poust	March 28, 2025
After Sybil reveals that the maid quit due to more men to clean after, the boys all work together to hire a new maid. They have multiple interviews and hire Bo (Adam Hagenbuch), a handsome man, to be their maid, without Sybil's input. On Bo's first day, he eavesdrops on the group and mistakes Bunny as a straight man, ignores Jerry, and spends most of the time on his phone while sitting down. He reveals to Sybil that he isn't a "house cleaner" but a "house keeper". She then fires the man, upsetting them, and replaces him with the better choice from their interviews, a female maid.
7	"Love Thy Neighbor"	James Burrows	David Kohan & Max Mutchnick	March 28, 2025
Jerry invites their neighbor the Congress woman over for drinks. As her beliefs are against Bunny and Arthur's, they plan to discuss it with her but are side tracked. Arthur is distracted by her small purse dog, Reagan, and Bunny gets really drunk. The next morning Jerry reveals that he did something he regrets with the woman. As there are photos of the evening, they are able to be used to blackmail the woman to decline a vote on a gay bill after the death of her dog.
8	"Sour Pickleball"	James Burrows	Alex Herschlag	March 28, 2025
Sybil reconnects with Alan, an old friend. Jerry, Arthur, Bunny and his sister Mindy play pickleball. During the games, Mindy takes it more seriously than the guys, making them no longer want to play with her anymore. When Mindy threatens to leave, Bunny talks her into staying.
9	"Here's to You, Mrs. Schneiderman"	James Burrows	David Kohan & Max Mutchnick	March 28, 2025
Sybil dies off screen not long after Jerry and Arthur discuss with Bunny about moving Sybil's unused car from the garage due to the heat. Bunny reveals that it was a heart attack. Bunny is put in charge of the funeral and refuses Jerry and Arthur's help.They approach Bunny who is writing the eulogy which isn't truly about his mother, so they look through old text messages to help Bunny.
10	"The Show Must Go On"	James Burrows	Suzanne Martin	March 28, 2025
Four months have passed since Sybil's death and now Bunny wants to go through his mom's things to turn the room into a gym. Mindy begins to remember the past while going through Sybil's things with Arthur. Jerry learns that the Mormon man he almost hooked up with, Mason, has shown up in Palm Springs after leaving his bride at the altar. Mason asks if he could stay with them, and Jerry immediately agrees, upsetting Bunny. Caroll then shows up, revealing that Bunny had invited the man without speaking to the others. He reveals that he is in love with Bunny, much to his surprise. The next meeting has Arthur yelling at Bunny for doing what Jerry had done. Mindy comes over and learns about Caroll and Mason being there. Mindy talks Mason into going back to talk to the woman he left at the altar, and then tells Caroll that Bunny isn't interested in him. Bunny, Arthur, and Jerry tell her that she was like Sybil. They then decide to offer Sybil's room to Mindy to which she declines. Before leaving Caroll pulls Bunny into a kiss, surprising him. Once both are gone, Mindy sends them a disco ball to put in their home gym to which the equipment had yet to arrive for. The episode ends with them dancing in the empty room while the disco ball shines on them.

== Release ==
Mid-Century Modern premiered on Hulu on March 28, 2025. The first season consists of ten episodes, which were released simultaneously. Internationally, the series was released on Disney+.

== Reception ==
=== Viewership ===
The streaming aggregator Reelgood, which tracks real-time data from 20 million U.S. users for original and acquired content across SVOD and AVOD services, reported that Mid-Century Modern was the tenth most-streamed series from March 27 to April 1. The series ranked No. 13 on Hulu's "Top 15 Today" list—a daily updated list of the platform's most-watched titles—on March 28. It later moved to No. 5 on March 30 and remained within the top fifteen through April 2. Market research company Parrot Analytics, which looks at consumer engagement in consumer research, streaming, downloads, and on social media, reported that Mid-Century Modern achieved demand levels 11.7 times the average show in the United Kingdom over the 30 days leading up to April 2025. This places the series among the top 2.7% of all shows by demand and earned it a rank of #131 overall. Despite experiencing a 74.9% decrease in demand during April, the show maintained a strong position within its genre, ranking in the 98.5th percentile for comedy.

=== Critical response ===
On the review aggregator website Rotten Tomatoes, 88% of 26 critics' reviews are positive, with an average rating of 7.4/10. The website's consensus reads: "Harkening back to the classic sitcom formula while unafraid to have a contemporary, risqué sense of humor, Mid-Century Modern is endearingly old-fashioned." On Metacritic, the series holds a weighted average score of 67 out of 100 based on 11 critics, indicating "generally favorable" reviews.

Matthew Creith of TheWrap said Mid-Century Modern embraces the spirit of classic sitcoms while adding a fresh, gay perspective. He praised the chemistry between Nathan Lane, Matt Bomer, Nathan Lee Graham, and Linda Lavin, noting their dynamic as the heart of the series. He found the show reminiscent of The Golden Girls and Hot in Cleveland, highlighting its humor and themes of friendship and romance without age limits. Creith stated that the series benefits from its Hulu placement, allowing raunchier humor and more daring jokes. He appreciated Lavin's final performance, calling it a standout in a show filled with memorable moments. Robert Lloyd of Los Angeles Times stated Mid-Century Modern is a heartfelt sitcom that balances humor with friendship among gay men. He praised Lavin's performance, noting her vitality and comedic skill, which make her death feel even more moving. He found the show loosely inspired by The Golden Girls, with its older ensemble cast navigating life, love, and friendship. Lloyd stated that the series stands out as a traditional multicamera sitcom set in a gay milieu, making it both timely and refreshing. He appreciated the mix of humor and sentiment, highlighting the strong performances, guest appearances, and Lane's long-overdue lead role in a sitcom.

Aramide Tinubu of Variety found that Mid-Century Modern is a delightful comedy that blends the wit of Will & Grace with the charm of The Golden Girls. She praised the show for its unique take on aging, grief, and love, with characters who reflect familiar sitcom archetypes. Tinubu appreciated the series' humor, especially its willingness to embrace cruder jokes, given its streaming platform. She found the ensemble cast to be a key strength, particularly Lavin's performance. Tinubu stated that the series delivers numerous laugh-out-loud moments and offers a refreshing portrayal of friendship. She appreciated that, while it does not break new ground, Mid-Century Modern offers comfort and humor during challenging times. Laura Babiak of The New York Observer praised Mid-Century Modern for its nostalgic yet contemporary take on the multi-camera sitcom format, highlighting its easy-to-watch, feel-good nature. She found the series refreshing in its portrayal of aging gay men, free from the need for a straight character, and appreciated the cast's performances, particularly Lane's portrayal of Bunny and Bomer's comedic timing. Babiak also acknowledged the emotional weight added by Lavin's final performance, especially in the penultimate episode. She noted that the show's humor, guest stars, and light-hearted tone made it an enjoyable, comforting experience, offering exactly what many viewers need in a comedy.

=== Accolades ===
Year	Award	Category	Nominee(s)	Result	Ref.
2025	Astra Television Awards	Best Cast Ensemble in a Streaming Comedy Series	Nathan Lane, Matt Bomer, Nathan Lee Graham, and Linda Lavin	Nominated	
2025	Creative Arts Emmy Awards	Outstanding Production Design for a Narrative Program (Half-Hour)	Greg J. Grande, Sam Kramer, and Peter M. Gurski	Nominated	
2025	Creative Arts Emmy Awards	Outstanding Sound Mixing for a Comedy or Drama Series (Half-Hour) and Animation	Peter Nusbaum, Whitney Purple, and Jeff A. Johnson	Nominated	
2025	Creative Arts Emmy Awards	Outstanding Picture Editing for a Multi-Camera Comedy Series	Peter Chakos	Nominated	
2025	Critics Choice Awards Celebration of Cinema & Television	LGBTQ+ Cinema & Television	Nathan Lee Graham	Won	
2025	Dorian TV Awards	Best Unsung TV Show	Mid-Century Modern	Nominated	
2025	Dorian TV Awards	Campiest TV Show	Mid-Century Modern	Nominated	
2025	Dorian TV Awards	Outstanding Supporting Performance in a Comedy Series	Linda Lavin	Nominated	
2025	Gotham TV Awards	Outstanding Supporting Performance in a Comedy Series	Linda Lavin	Nominated	
2025	Primetime Emmy Awards	Outstanding Directing for a Comedy Series	James Burrows	Nominated	
2026	Queerties Awards	TV Comedy	Mid-Century Modern	Nominated	
