= Tracy Vilar =

American actress

- Occupation: Actress
- Years active: 1994 – present
- Website: https://twitter.com/tracyvilar

Tracy Vilar is an American actress.

== Career ==
She is best known for her roles as Ro-Ro on the CBS sitcom Partners, Sophia Ortiz on The WB sitcom The Steve Harvey Show, and Angela de la Cruz on the TNT television show, Saved.

== Filmography ==
=== Film ===
| Year | Title | Role | Notes |
|---|---|---|---|
| 1994 | The Cosby Mysteries | Cop | TV movie |
| 1994 | Fresh | Girl #1 | |
| 1994 | Crooklyn | Monica | |
| 1996 | Sunset Park | Shirley | |
| 1996 | Joe's Apartment | Complaint Handler | |
| 1996 | Grace of My Heart | Annie | |
| 1997 | Gridlock'd | Screaming Woman | |
| 1997 | Two Came Back | Coast Guardswoman | TV movie |
| 1998 | Life in the Fast Lane | Shirley | |
| 1999 | Double Jeopardy | Orbe | |
| 2000 | Details | Cecilia | Short |
| 2001 | K-PAX | Maria | |
| 2001 | Porno Outtakes | The Maid | Video Short |
| 2002 | Full Frontal | Heather | |
| 2004 | Mean Jadine | Fairy Godmother | Short |
| 2009 | I.E.P. | Ms. Shandra Taylor | Short |
| 2014 | Search Party | Sarah MacLachlan | |
| 2016 | Officer Downe | Hanso | |
| 2023 | Missing | Detective Gomez | |

=== Television ===
| Year | Title | Role | Notes |
|---|---|---|---|
| 1995 | First Time Out | Rosa | Main Cast |
| 1996 | Kirk | Gina | Episode: "For Whom the Wedding Bells Toll: Part 1 & 2" |
| 1996–97 | The Steve Harvey Show | Sophia Ortiz | Main Cast: Season 1 |
| 1997 | Living Single | Ava Rivera | Episode: "Too Good to Screw" |
| 1997 | ER | Doris | Episode: "Ambush" & "When the Bough Breaks" |
| 1997 | Fired Up | Gina | Episode: "The Baby-Sitter's Club" |
| 1999 | Oh, Grow Up | Dr. Rinaldi | Episode: "Love Stinks" |
| 1999 | NYPD Blue | Elvie Inglesias | Episode: "Dead Girl Walking" |
| 2000 | Strong Medicine | Marisol Santos | Episode: "Do No Harm" |
| 2001 | One on One | Ms. Moody | Episode: "Let's Wait Awhile" & "Playing Possum" |
| 2001 | CSI: Crime Scene Investigation | Carla Delgado | Episode: "Slaves of Las Vegas" |
| 2002 | Girlfriends | Gigi | Episode: "X Does Not Mark the Spot" |
| 2002 | For the People | Victoria | Episode: "Lonely Hearts" |
| 2002 | The Parkers | Paullina | Episode: "And the Winner Is..." |
| 2002 | MDs | NICU Nurse Lillian | Recurring Cast |
| 2003–04 | Good Morning, Miami | Stacy | Recurring Cast: Season 2 |
| 2004 | Curb Your Enthusiasm | Nurse #1 | Episode: "Mel's Offer" |
| 2004 | NYPD Blue | Rosa | Episode: "Peeler? I Hardley Knew Her" |
| 2006 | Saved | Angela de la Cruz | Main Cast |
| 2008–12 | House | Nurse Regina | Recurring Cast: Season 5-8 |
| 2012 | 2 Broke Girls | Maria | Episode: "And the Big Buttercream Breakthrough" |
| 2012 | Partners | Ro-Ro | Recurring Cast |
| 2013 | Grey's Anatomy | Becca McMurdo | Episode: "Man on the Moon" |
| 2014 | How to Get Away with Murder | Ms. Barker | Episode: "We're Not Friends" |
| 2016 | JoJoHead | Herself | Episode: "People Who Probably Meant Well" |
| 2017 | Doubt | ADA Delgado | Episode: "Then and Now" |
| 2017 | Get Shorty | FBI Operator | Episode: "Turnaround" & "Blue Pages" |
| 2019 | Fresh Off the Boat | Ms. Duggan | Episode: "You've Got a Girlfriend" |
| 2019 | For the People | Lynda Perez | Episode: "Moral Suasion" |
| 2019 | Gods of Food | Laura Sepanowitz | Episode: "Laura Sepanowitz: The Passionate Tastemaker" |
| 2019 | Epic Night | Corrine | Episode: "Part 1" |
| 2020 | Mom | Lorraine | Episode: "Cheddar Cheese and a Squirrel Circus" |
| 2020 | Swipe Right | Jane | Episode: "Episode #1.4" |
| 2020 | Outmatched | Principal Ramos | Episode: "Principal Ramos" |
| 2021 | Maid | Yolanda | Main Cast |
| 2022 | The Good Doctor | Luna | Episode: "Sorry, Not Sorry" |
| 2023 | High Desert | Tina | Recurring Cast |
| 2025–present | The Pitt | Lupe Perez | Recurring Cast |

== Awards and nominations ==
In 1996, Tracy was nominated for Outstanding Individual Performance in a Comedy Series for her role as Sophia Ortiz in The Steve Harvey Show at the NCLR Bravo Awards. In 1998, she was nominated for Outstanding Actress in a Comedy Series in the same role at the ALMA Awards. That same year, she won the Margo Albert Award for Most Promising Actress. In 2026, she won for an Actor Award for Outstanding Performance by an Ensemble in a Drama Series for her role in The Pitt.

| Year | Award | Category | Work | Result | Ref. |
|---|---|---|---|---|---|
| 2026 | Actor Awards | Outstanding Performance by an Ensemble in a Drama Series | The Pitt | Won | |
