= Jenji Kohan =

American television writer, producer, and director

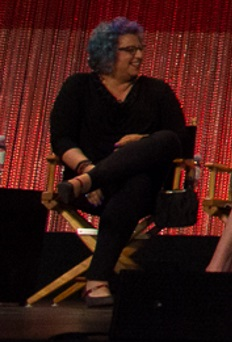
- Kohan at 2014 Paley Fest
- Born: Jenji Leslie Kohan; July 5, 1969 (age 57); Los Angeles, California, U.S.
- Education: Columbia University
- Occupations: Television writer, producer
- Years active: 1994–present
- Spouse: Christopher Noxon (m. 1997; div. 2018)
- Children: 3
- Parent(s): Buz Kohan; Rhea Kohan
- Relatives: David Kohan (brother); Jono Kohan (brother)

Jenji Leslie Kohan (born July 5, 1969) is an American television writer and producer. She is best known as the creator and showrunner of the Showtime comedy-drama series Weeds and the Netflix comedy-drama series Orange Is the New Black. She has received nine Emmy Award nominations, winning one as supervising producer of the comedy series Tracey Takes On....

== Early life ==
Kohan was born to a Jewish family in Los Angeles, California, the daughter of Rhea Kohan and Alan W. "Buz" Kohan. She is the youngest of three siblings; the other two are twins Jono and David. Much of the family is in show business:

- Father Buz is an Emmy Award-winning television writer and producer, as well as a music composer. Kohan says that her father was the "king of variety television in his day," writing and producing the Oscars and other variety shows.
- Mother Rhea is a television writer, novelist, and occasional actress.
- Brother David is an Emmy Award-winning television producer.

Kohan's paternal grandparents were Charles Kohan, who was born in Romania in 1902, and May E. Charles, who was born in New York City, to parents from Russia. The two knew each other from childhood and grew up in a New York City settlement house on the Lower East Side of Manhattan.

Kohan grew up in Beverly Hills, California and graduated from Beverly Hills High School, in 1987. She first attended Brandeis University, then transferred to Columbia University as a sophomore, where she graduated, with a degree in English language and literature, in 1991.

== Career ==
Kohan's first job in the industry was with The Fresh Prince of Bel-Air, of which Kohan wrote one episode, and later said was a "rough entrance" to the business. After a series of writing jobs on shows such as Mad About You, Tracey Takes On..., and Friends, she collaborated with her brother, David Kohan, writing an outside script for Will & Grace. The siblings also worked together on the sitcom The Stones for CBS, which was ultimately unsuccessful. She has discussed the differences between her and her brother's career saying, "David took the big, commercial, funny route; I was always a little darker personally, and not terrific within the system. I had to make my own way."

=== Weeds ===
Kohan was the creator of the Showtime dark comedy-drama television series Weeds, which she executive produced as showrunner and head writer at her writing studio, Tilted Productions, in Los Angeles, California throughout its entire eight season airing.

=== Orange Is the New Black ===
Kohan created the Netflix comedy drama Orange Is the New Black, an adaptation that was inspired by Piper Kerman's memoir Orange Is the New Black: My Year in a Women's Prison about her experiences in a minimum-security women's prison. Kohan's executive producing duties as showrunner and head writer consists of running the writer's room, which is located at her writing studio, Tilted Productions, in Los Angeles, California. Principal photography takes place in New York.

Netflix, as a streaming service distribution model of TV and movie content, is unique in that it does not provide ratings information, so Kohan does not know exact ratings for Orange Is the New Black, which has been characterized as the most watched original series on Netflix, in a new distribution model where binge viewing is enabled by full seasons of shows being made available at once.

=== Other projects ===
==== Producing ====
Kohan has an overall deal with Netflix. She served as Executive Producer on the Netflix series Teenage Bounty Hunters and The Decameron.

==== Hayworth Theatre ====
Kohan owns the historic Hayworth Theatre in Los Angeles. One floor is used for production and two for postproduction. She plans on turning the auditorium into a venue for performances.

== Personal life ==
Kohan has three children. The oldest was her son Charlie, who died in a skiing accident on December 31, 2019; the middle child is her daughter Eliza, and the youngest is her son Oscar. They live in the Los Feliz neighborhood of Los Angeles. Kohan and her family are practicing Jews of the Reform denomination.

== Filmography ==
=== Television ===
Numbers in writing and producing credits refer to number of episodes.

Year	Title	Credited as			Notes
Year	Title	Creator	Writer	Producer	Notes
1994	The Fresh Prince of Bel-Air	No	Yes (1)	No	Episode: "Stop Will! In the Name of Love"
1994	Friends	No	Yes (1)	No	Episode: "The One Where Underdog Gets Away"; uncredited
1995	First Time Out	No	No	Co- (1)	Episode: "The Sale Show"
1996	Boston Common	No	Yes (1)	No	Episode: "Relationship of Fools"
1996–1999	Tracey Takes On...	No	Yes (37)	Yes (47)	Also supervising producer, 2 episodes
1996–1997	Mad About You	No	Yes (3); Story (1)	Yes (24)	
1998	Sex and the City	No	Story (1)	No	Episode: "The Power of Female Sex"
2000	Gilmore Girls	No	Yes (1)	Yes (12)	Writer, episode: "Kiss and Tell"
2002	My Adventures in Television	No	Yes (1)	Supervising (1)	
2002	Will & Grace	No	Yes (1)	No	Episode: "Fagel Attraction"
2004	The Stones	Yes	Yes (2)	Executive	
2005–2012	Weeds	Yes	Yes (21)	Executive	Also showrunner
2013–2019	Orange Is the New Black	Yes	Yes (14)	Executive	Also showrunner
2017–2020	GLOW	No	Yes (1)	Executive	Writer, episode: "This is One of Those Moments"
2019	American Princess	No	No	Executive	
2020	Teenage Bounty Hunters	No	Yes (1)	Executive	Writer, episode: "Our Ham is Good"
2020	Social Distance	No	No	Executive	
2021	Worn Stories	No	No	Executive	Docuseries
2024	The Decameron	No	No	Executive	

=== Unsold TV pilots ===
Year	Title	Credited as		
Year	Title	Creator	Writer	Executive Producer
2002	My Wonderful Life	No	Yes	Yes
2007	Me & Lee?	No	No	Yes
2009	Ronna & Beverly	No	Yes	Yes
2010	Tough Trade	Yes	Yes	Yes
2015	The Devil You Know	Yes	Yes	No

== Awards and nominations ==
Primetime Emmy Awards
Year	Category	Series	Result	Ref.
1996	Outstanding Variety Series	Tracey Takes On...	Nominated	
1996	Outstanding Writing for a Variety Series	Tracey Takes On...	Nominated	
1997	Outstanding Comedy Series	Mad About You	Nominated	
1997	Outstanding Variety Series	Tracey Takes On...	Won	
1997	Outstanding Writing for a Variety Series	Tracey Takes On...	Nominated	
1999	Outstanding Variety Series	Tracey Takes On...	Nominated	
2009	Outstanding Comedy Series	Weeds	Nominated	
2014	Outstanding Comedy Series	Orange is the New Black	Nominated	
2014	Outstanding Writing for a Comedy Series	Orange is the New Black	Nominated	
2015	Outstanding Drama Series	Orange is the New Black	Nominated	

Producers Guild of America Awards
Year	Category	Series	Result	Ref.
2006	Best Episodic Comedy	Weeds	Nominated	
2008	Best Episodic Comedy	Weeds	Nominated	
2009	Best Episodic Comedy	Weeds	Nominated	
2014	Best Episodic Comedy	Orange is the New Black	Won	
2018	Best Episodic Comedy	GLOW	Nominated	
