= Rhea Kohan =

American writer and novelist

- Born: Rhea Arnold
- Occupation: Novelist
- Spouse: Buz Kohan (m. 1962)
- Children: 3, including David and Jenji Kohan

Rhea Kohan (née Arnold) is an American writer, author of the novels Save Me a Seat (1979) and Hand-Me-Downs (1980).

== Biography ==
Born Rhea Arnold, Kohan grew up in a traditional Jewish home in Brooklyn, New York. Her mother was a homemaker and her father was a school principal who moonlighted as head of the local yeshiva. She studied chemistry in college.

She is married to Emmy award-winning writer, producer, and composer, Buz Kohan, and mother of twins Jono and David, and Jenji Kohan.

== Published works ==
- Kohan, Rhea (1979). Save Me a Seat. HarperCollins. ISBN 978-0060124281.
- Kohan, Rhea (1980). Hand-Me-Downs. Random House. ISBN 978-0394511610.
