= Four Kings =

- Genre: Sitcom
- Created by: David Kohan; Max Mutchnick
- Directed by: Barnet Kellman; James Burrows (pilot)
- Starring: Josh Cooke; Seth Green; Shane McRae; Todd Grinnell
- Opening theme: "Hanginaround" performed by Counting Crows
- Composers: Scott Clausen; Chris Allen Lee
- Country of origin: United States
- Original language: English
- No. of seasons: 1
- No. of episodes: 13 (6 unaired)

Production
- Executive producers: David Kohan; Max Mutchnick
- Camera setup: Multi-camera
- Running time: 30 minutes
- Production companies: KoMut Entertainment; Warner Bros. Television

Original release
- Network: NBC
- Release: January 5 – March 16, 2006

Four Kings is an American television sitcom that aired on NBC from January 5 to March 16, 2006, as a part of winter 2006 programming, but was cancelled before the end of the season. It starred Seth Green, Josh Cooke, Shane McRae, and Todd Grinnell. The show was created by David Kohan and Max Mutchnick, both of whom created Will & Grace.

The show centers on four childhood friends who live in New York City. The show's theme is "Hanginaround" by Counting Crows. Four Kings was pulled from NBC's schedule after its airing on March 16, 2006, and on May 15, 2006, NBC confirmed the show's cancellation. Two of the show's stars had already signed on to new projects, which did not bode well for the show's chances of renewal. Though NBC originally announced that they would air the remaining episodes beginning May 25, 2006, they did not follow through. The unaired episodes would eventually air in syndication on the Living network in the UK, and on the Nine Network in Australia.

== Cast ==
- Seth Green as Barry Klein
- Todd Grinnell as Jason
- Shane McRae as Robert "Bobby"
- Josh Cooke as Benjamin "Ben" Wolf
- Kathryn Hahn as Sharon
- Kate Micucci as Toni
- Rachelle Lefevre as Lauren
- Michael Des Barres as Nick Dresden

== Episodes ==
No.	Title	Directed by	Written by	Original release date	Prod. code	U.S. viewers (millions)
1	"Pilot"	James Burrows	David Kohan & Max Mutchnick	January 5, 2006	475280	8.86
2	"One Night Stand Off"	Barnet Kellman	Katy Ballard	January 12, 2006	2T7351	9.12
3	"Chest, Mate"	Barnet Kellman	Julie Larson	January 19, 2006	2T7352	7.43
4	"Tale of the Tape"	Barnet Kellman	Daniel Hsia	January 26, 2006	2T7353	6.28
5	"The Elephant in the Room"	Barnet Kellman	Jonathan Goldstein	February 2, 2006	2T7354	6.60
6	"Follow the Money"	Barnet Kellman	Gabe Miller & Jonathan Green	February 9, 2006	2T7355	6.33
7	"Night of the Iguana"	Barnet Kellman	Bill Daly & Katy Ballard	March 16, 2006	2T7357	6.83
8	"House Rules"	Barnet Kellman	Lester Lewis	Unaired	2T7356	N/A
9	"Bobby's Song"	Barnet Kellman	Bill Daly	Unaired	2T7358	N/A
10	"Upper West Side Story"	Barnet Kellman	Rich Rinaldi & Dan Fybel	Unaired	2T7359	N/A
11	"Check, Please"	Barnet Kellman	Laura Gutin	Unaired	2T7360	N/A
12	"Lobby Girl"	Barnet Kellman	Jonathan Goldstein	Unaired	2T7361	N/A
13	"Black Widow's Lair"	Barnet Kellman	Lester Lewis	Unaired	2T7362	N/A
