= $h*! My Dad Says =

American television sitcom created by David Kohan and Max Mutchnick for CBS

$#*! My Dad Says
- Genre: Sitcom
- Created by: David Kohan; Max Mutchnick; Justin Halpern; Patrick Schumacker
- Starring: William Shatner; Jonathan Sadowski; Nicole Sullivan; Will Sasso
- Opening theme: "Your Dogs" by Ben Folds
- Composer: Paul Buckley
- Country of origin: United States
- Original language: English
- No. of seasons: 1
- No. of episodes: 18

Production
- Executive producers: David Kohan; Max Mutchnick
- Camera setup: Film; Multi-camera
- Running time: 21 minutes
- Production companies: KoMut Entertainment; Bonanza Productions; Warner Bros. Television

Original release
- Network: CBS
- Release: September 23, 2010 – February 17, 2011

$#*! My Dad Says (pronounced "Bleep My Dad Says") is an American television sitcom produced by Warner Bros. Television that aired on CBS. It was based on the Twitter feed Shit My Dad Says, created by Justin Halpern and consisting of quotations from his father, Sam.

The show originally ran from September 23, 2010, to February 17, 2011, and aired on Thursdays at 8:30 pm/7:30 pm Central. After 18 episodes aired, the series was replaced in mid-season by Rules of Engagement, which had moved to Thursdays from Mondays.

On May 15, 2011, CBS canceled the series after one season.

== Plot ==
Ed is a very opinionated 72-year-old who has been divorced three times. His two adult sons, Henry and Vince, are accustomed to his unsolicited and often politically incorrect rants. When Henry, a struggling writer and blogger, can no longer afford his rent, he is forced to move back in with Ed, which creates new problems in their tricky father–son relationship. As weeks go by Henry is unable to find a job as a writer, mostly due to the lack of good material. He finally lands a job, when during his interview Ed interrupts with an irrational phone call that sparks the interest of the eccentric editor conducting the interview. Henry is ultimately hired, but is forced to continue living with Ed in order to have readily available material via his father's unsolicited rants, hence the title $#*! My Dad Says.

== Cast ==
=== Main ===
- William Shatner as Dr. Edison Milford "Ed" Goodson III
- Jonathan Sadowski as Henry Goodson
- Nicole Sullivan as Bonnie Goodson
- Will Sasso as Vincent "Vince" Goodson

=== Recurring ===
- Tim Bagley as Tim
- Sam Pancake as Lawrence

== Development and production ==
In November 2009, CBS announced that it was developing a television pilot based on the Twitter feed, which would be written by Halpern and Patrick Schumacker. William Shatner landed the lead role in late February 2010, which triggered a green-light to produce the pilot. Nicole Sullivan and Ryan Devlin came on board in early March. Casting was completed with the addition of Will Sasso as Vince and Stephanie Lemelin as Sam later that month. Both Sasso and Sullivan had previously been cast-mates on the series Mad TV. (Note: See List of Mad TV cast members)

The series was picked up by CBS in May 2010, with reports saying that the role of Henry (played by Ryan Devlin in the pilot) would be recast. In July, Jonathan Sadowski was cast in the role. The character Sam (Stephanie Lemelin) was eliminated, never appearing in the broadcast pilot or subsequent episodes.

== Episodes ==
| No. | Title | Directed by | Written by | Original release date | Prod. code | US viewers (millions) |
|---|---|---|---|---|---|---|
| 1 | "Pilot" | James Burrows | David Kohan & Max Mutchnick & Justin Halpern & Patrick Schumacker | September 23, 2010 | 2J5651 | 12.58 |
Henry (Jonathan Sadowski) gets laid off from his job and decides to see if he can borrow money from his father Ed (William Shatner). Meanwhile Ed must work to get his driver's license again after he forgot to renew it. Two other main characters, Henry's brother Vince (Will Sasso) and his wife Bonnie (Nicole Sullivan), also visit Ed and Henry from time to time.
| 2 | "Wi-Fight" | Gail Mancuso | Jeff Astrof | September 30, 2010 | 2J5652 | 10.43 |
When Henry wants to get an Internet connection hooked up for the house, Ed forbids it, but Henry doesn't give up. Bonnie has a rash on her breast and asks Ed, who is a doctor, to take a look so he can diagnose it.
| 3 | "The Truth About Dads and Moms" | Rob Schiller | Erin Ehrlich | October 7, 2010 | 2J5653 | 9.77 |
After Ed takes Henry out to an early dinner one night, they bump into Tim (Tim Bagley), who was fired for forging Ed's driver's test. Henry disagrees with Ed on what should be done to fix it. Meanwhile Bonnie gets an expensive make-up job and is determined to make it last to get her money out of it. Also Vince tells Henry of what really happened when they were younger.
| 4 | "Code Ed" | Rob Schiller | Nate Reger & Michael Lisbe | October 14, 2010 | 2J5654 | 10.16 |
At the coffee shop, Henry manages to pluck up the courage to ask the attractive cashier out on a date. Her condition is that it is a double date with her Aunt, and Ed.
| 5 | "Not Without My Jacket" | Gail Mancuso | Justin Halpern & Patrick Schumaker | October 21, 2010 | 2J5655 | 10.91 |
Ed gets upset when Henry uses his coffee mug without permission, explaining that it's his rule that someone must clear it with him before borrowing something (and he never breaks his rules). However, Ed must go to great lengths to retrieve a jacket of Henry's that he accidentally lent out without asking, to avoid looking like a hypocrite.
| 6 | "Easy, Writer" | Gail Mancuso | David Katz | October 28, 2010 | 2J5657 | 10.81 |
Henry writes an article about Ed, but Ed is embarrassed by it. Bonnie and Vince become friends with an important couple in the San Diego real estate scene.
| 7 | "Dog Ed Pursuit" | Gail Mancuso | Jeff Astrof | November 4, 2010 | 2J5658 | 11.01 |
Ed finds himself attached to Root Beer, Vince and Bonnie's dog. Meanwhile, Henry has very rough sex with Vince and Bonnie's supervisor as Bonnie tells Ed to do the same human-canine attachment to Vince.
| 8 | "The Manly Thing to Do" | Michael McDonald | Justin Halpern & Patrick Schumacker | November 11, 2010 | 2J5659 | 9.72 |
An old Navy buddy of Ed's comes to visit, but his bad attitude about homosexuals and Ed's passivity towards it drive Tim away. Henry has an awkward moment with Bonnie that Vince only makes even more awkward.
| 9 | "Make a WISH" | Rob Schiller | Jeff Astrof | November 18, 2010 | 2J5660 | 10.13 |
Ed and Henry are watching TV when an infomercial comes on for wish a self-help guru, Charlotte Anne Robinson (Cybill Shepherd); Ed asks who would fall for that kind of scam when Vince and Bonnie walk in saying they have quit their real estate jobs to start a real estate business because they wished for it.
| 10 | "You Can't Handle the Truce" | Gail Mancuso | David Katz | December 9, 2010 | 2J5656 | 9.40 |
Henry tries to broker a truce between Ed and his neighbor of 25 years. Vince and Bonnie have trouble adopting a dog so Ed finds a solution.
| 11 | "Family Dinner for Schmucks" | Rob Schiller | Chris Kelly | December 16, 2010 | 2J5661 | 10.30 |
Bonnie tries to start a family tradition. Henry gets in trouble for taking the blame for a friend's mistake. Ed makes a friend at the hospital with his personality.
| 12 | "Goodson Goes Deep" | Steve Zuckerman | Jonathan Goldstein | January 6, 2011 | 2J5662 | 10.79 |
Ed wants baseball memorabilia that was promised to him but then sold to someone else. Bonnie and Vince move in to the garage so they can try to get pregnant with less distraction.
| 13 | "The Better Father" | Peter Bonerz | Jeff Astrof | January 13, 2011 | 2J5663 | 10.14 |
When Bonnie and Vince find out the Reverend who married them was a fake, they decide to throw another wedding. Bonnie invites her father, Terry (Ed Begley Jr.), who failed to show up at her last wedding because of a gambling problem. When he says he has changed his life, Ed finds him gambling away the money for food for the wedding. Meanwhile, Vince is having problems finding a tuxedo for his wedding. Then when Ed helps Bonnie's father win the money back, Bonnie's father finds another gambling chip and fails to show up at his daughter's wedding again. The episode ends with Ed walking Bonnie down the aisle.
| 14 | "Corn Star" | Peter Bonerz | Justin Halpern & Patrick Schumacker | January 20, 2011 | 2J5664 | 10.29 |
When the height of Ed's corn stalks becomes an issue with the home owners' association, he decides to fix the problem by running for president of the association.
| 15 | "Ed Goes to Court" | Ted Wass | Jeff Astrof | January 27, 2011 | 2J5665 | 8.74 |
As the newly-elected head of the Homeowners' Association, Ed is more concerned with pursuing his neighbor Rosemary Pernworth than passing any legislation.
| 16 | "Well Suitored" | Ted Wass | Jeff Astrof | February 3, 2011 | 2J5666 | 10.45 |
Ed is reluctant to go exclusive in his relationship with Rosemary, so he finds himself with competition for her heart. Vince and Bonnie's old boss drops by with a very peculiar present.
| 17 | "Lock and Load" | Steve Zuckerman | Chris Kelly | February 10, 2011 | 2J5667 | 10.34 |
Rosemary doesn't like the idea of Ed keeping a gun in the house even though a robber has been breaking in to people's houses. Vince watches porn to see how Vince and Bonnie can have a baby right, Rosemary accidentally shoots Vince when she thinks it is actually someone else in the house.
| 18 | "Who's Your Daddy?" | Steve Zuckerman | Steve Gabriel | February 17, 2011 | 2J5668 | 9.70 |
After meeting Henry's new girlfriend, Ed realizes he has a strange connection with her.

== Reception ==
$#*! My Dad Says received negative reviews, with Metacritic assigning it a score of 28/100. On Rotten Tomatoes, the series has a score of 0% based on 26 critic reviews. The website's consensus reads: "$#*! My Dad Says features childish jokes, abysmal writing, and the half-baked stunt casting of William Shatner." Over 12 million viewers watched the premiere, although the next two episodes lost nearly 20% of that audience. The fourth and fifth episodes improved in ratings, being 10.16 million and 10.91 million respectively. The show won the award for Favorite New TV Comedy at the 37th People's Choice Awards on January 5, 2011.

=== Controversy ===
The title of the broadcast series was modified from the source material in order to comply with Federal Communications Commission regulations on the use of profane language during prime time. The profanity was also toned down and modified from Halpern's Twitter feeds.

On May 19, 2010, CBS announced the show's official name and 8:30 pm time slot at its upfront presentation of the fall 2010 schedule. Addressing reporters' concerns regarding the title, the network assured them that the expletive would not be used in promos. Soon thereafter, the Parents Television Council announced that it was protesting the title because it alluded to an obscenity. The PTC threatened CBS with broadcast license challenges for any affiliate airing the show or its promos before 10 pm.

Responding to the controversy, CBS stated, "[The show] will in no way be indecent and will adhere to all CBS standards. Parents who choose to do so will find the show can be easily blocked using their V Chip." Show star Shatner commented on the show's title, saying "We say spit; why can't we say shit?" In addition, Bill Gorman from TVbytheNumbers wrote that the PTC protest was just giving the show more publicity, which he expected would boost ratings.

At the July 2010 Television Critics Association press tour, Shatner further commented on the title saying, "The word 'shit' is around us. It isn't a terrible term. It's a natural function. Why are we pussyfooting?"

== In popular culture ==
In 2011, Cartoon Network's MAD aired a parody promo for $h*! My Dad Says called, "Meep! My Dad Says". It is a crossover between $h*! My Dad Says and Looney Tunes which features the Road Runner playing the role of the dad. His classic "Meep! Meeps!" are used to imitate censor bleeps, with black bars being placed over his mouth when he speaks.

== See also ==
- Surviving Jack, a second series surrounding the blog posts by Justin Halpern
