= Molly Stanton =

American actress

- Occupation: Actress
- Years active: 1999–2017

Molly Stanton is an American former actress from Santa Monica, California.

== Biography ==
Stanton is best known for her role as Charity Standish on the soap opera Passions from the show's debut in 1999 until 2004. Stanton also played Charity's evil doppelganger Zombie Charity as well as her character's own ancestor Prudence Standish in flashbacks.

She has guest-starred on television shows such as 10-8 and CSI: Miami. Stanton starred on The WB's Twins alongside Sara Gilbert and Melanie Griffith, which aired from September 2005 to May 2006, playing the role of Farrah.

Molly starred on Fox Network's Do Not Disturb alongside Jerry O'Connell and Niecy Nash, which aired in the Fall of 2008. The show was canceled after 3 episodes. In 2009, Stanton appeared in Miss March as Candace. In 2013 she played Olivia King in “Year End Blowout”, S2:E7 of Major Crimes.

Stanton later trained to become an aesthetician and opened Sage Lane Skincare, where she conducts microcurrent treatments.
