= Partners (2012 TV series) =

- Genre: Sitcom
- Created by: David Kohan; Max Mutchnick
- Directed by: James Burrows
- Starring: David Krumholtz; Michael Urie; Sophia Bush; Brandon Routh
- Opening theme: "On Top of the World" by Imagine Dragons
- Country of origin: United States
- Original language: English
- No. of seasons: 1
- No. of episodes: 13

Production
- Executive producers: David Kohan; Max Mutchnick
- Camera setup: Multi-camera
- Running time: 22 minutes
- Production companies: KoMut Entertainment; Warner Bros. Television

Original release
- Network: CBS
- Release: September 24, 2012 – May 7, 2013

Partners is an American television sitcom that aired on CBS from September 24 to November 12, 2012, on Monday nights at 8:30 p.m., following the sitcom How I Met Your Mother. The series was created by Will & Grace creators Max Mutchnick and David Kohan, who also served as the show's executive producers, and stars Michael Urie, David Krumholtz, Sophia Bush, and Brandon Routh.

== Premise ==
Although they could not be more different, Louis and Joe are lifelong friends and partners in an architecture firm in New York City. Their "bromance" is tested when Joe gets engaged to Ali and Louis is in a new relationship with Wyatt.

== Cast and characters ==
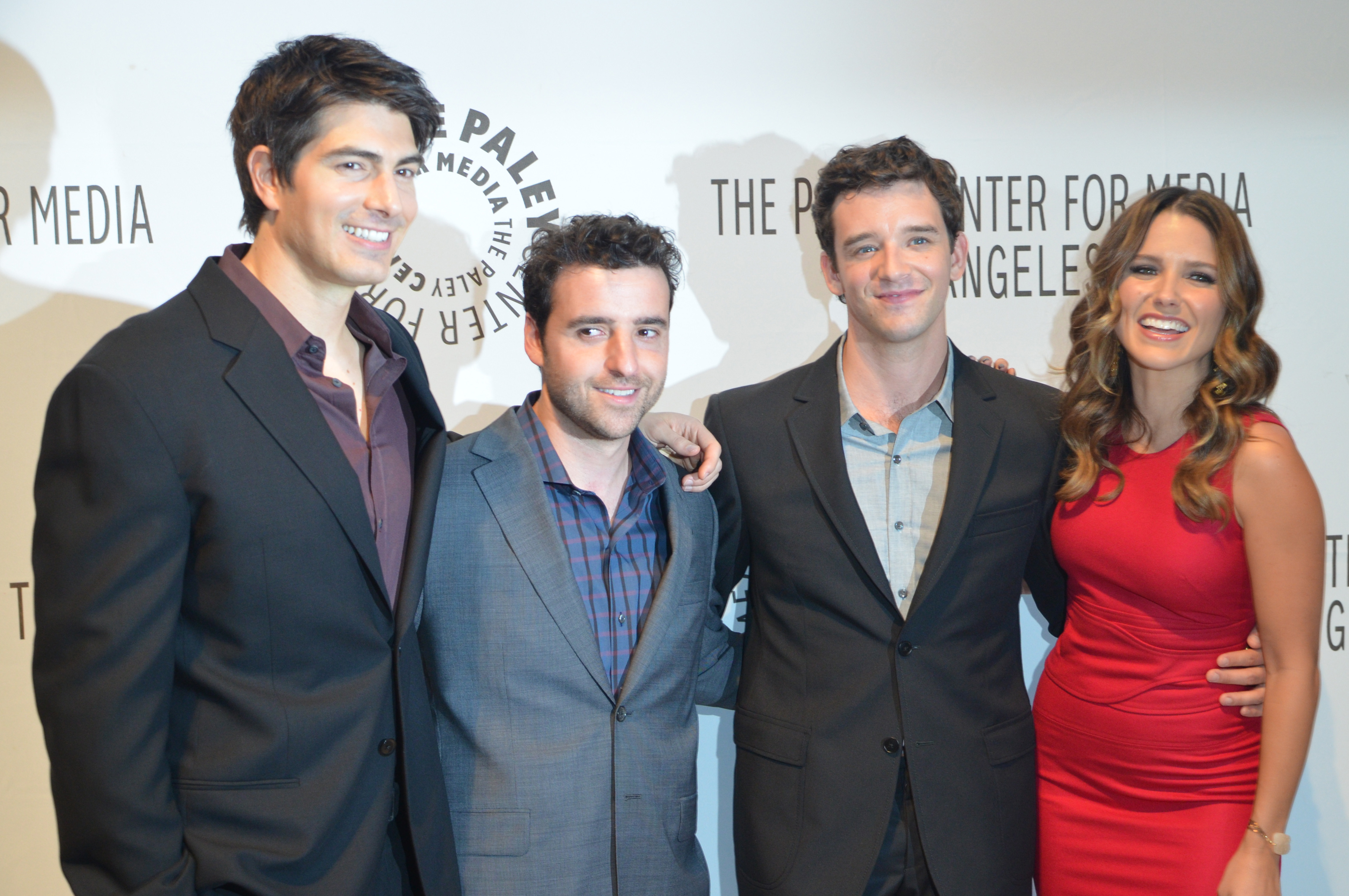
The show's cast members at the show's PaleyFest; from left to right: Routh, Krumholtz, Urie and Bush

=== Main ===
- David Krumholtz as Joseph "Joe" Goodman, an architect
- Michael Urie as Louis McManus, Joe's best friend and business partner
- Sophia Bush as Alexandra "Ali" Landow, Joe's fiancée
- Brandon Routh as Wyatt Plank, Louis' boyfriend

=== Recurring ===
- Tracy Vilar as Ro-Ro, Joe and Louis' secretary
- Jillian Bell as Renata, Ali's hapless cousin and assistant
- Randy Sklar and Jason Sklar as Jordy and Nate Blevins, twin architects who have a friendly rivalry with Joe and Louis

== Production ==
CBS cancelled Partners on November 16, 2012, prior to the planned November 19 airing of episode 7, "Pretty Funny", and announced that the show would be immediately removed from the schedule. The show was replaced with reruns of Two and a Half Men and The Big Bang Theory, leaving seven filmed episodes unaired in the USA and Canada. Filming on the final episode concluded a week later, on November 21. Seven episodes remain unaired in the U.S., but all 13 episodes have been aired by South African channel M-Net, Indian channel Zee Café and by HBO Comedy in Bosnia and Herzegovina, Bulgaria, Croatia, the Czech Republic, Hungary, Kosovo, Macedonia, Montenegro, Poland, Romania, Serbia, Slovakia and Slovenia.

Within days, the show's page was removed from the CBS website and the show was removed from the People's Choice Awards online ballot for Favorite New TV Comedy.

== Episodes ==
Every episode of the series was directed by James Burrows.

No.	Title	Written by	Original release date	Prod. code	U.S. viewers (millions)
1	"Pilot"	David Kohan & Max Mutchnick	September 24, 2012	276057	6.56
Joe and Louis have been best friends since they were young kids and now work together at their own company. When Joe tells Louis he was given a relationship ultimatum by his current girlfriend, Ali, Louis convinces Joe to break up with her. However, Joe has a moment of enlightenment and ends up proposing to Ali. Later, Louis accidentally tells Ali about Joe's original break up plan, and Louis then finds himself not only fixing his best friend's relationship, but their friendship as well.
2	"Chicken & Stuffing"	David Kohan & Max Mutchnick & Jeff Astrof	October 1, 2012	3X7853	5.76
Louis interferes when Joe confides that he and Ali have not had sex in over a week, encouraging her to take the initiative. He further interferes when he learns she has never cooked dinner for Joe, inducing her to make his zesty lemon chicken recipe. Although angered by Louis's interference, Joe interferes himself by ordering a cake when Louis forgets Wyatt's fifth "sober birthday". The friends agree that each is good at taking care of the other.
3	"The Jeter Exception"	Jeff Astrof	October 8, 2012	3X7854	5.71
Joe becomes upset when, after snooping through the belongings Ali is moving into his apartment, he discovers provocative photographs of her with baseball player Derek Jeter. Ali in turn is upset that Joe again violated her trust by confiding their personal business to Louis. He promises to stop doing so but falls into a trap Ali laid when she proves that he told Louis that she had had sex with Justin Timberlake. Meanwhile, a particularly vicious game of Celebrity leads Wyatt to feel insecure about his relationship with Louis. Louis promises to try to be less intense and competitive.
4	"The Key"	David Kohan & Max Mutchnick	October 15, 2012	3X7852	6.08
Louis pretends to become vegan and a teetotaler for Wyatt. Louis walks in on Ali while she is changing her clothes in Joe's apartment. Ali is furious that Louis has a key to Joe's apartment but she does not. Joe gives Ali a key, but Ali wants Louis to give up his. When Joe asks Louis for the key, he refuses but later finds the lock changed. At dinner that night Louis returns everything Joe ever gave him. When the two find a childhood oath swearing eternal friendship, they make up. At the same time, Louis finds out that Wyatt knew all along that Louis was only pretending.
5	"2 Broke Guys"	David Kohan & Max Mutchnick	November 5, 2012	3X7858	5.67
Joe and Louis struggle to gain a client. Meanwhile, Ali has Wyatt help with some remodeling at the shop. When they kiss, Joe becomes upset because of Wyatt's looks, but Ali claims that she feels nothing in the kiss.
6	"Temporary Insanity"	Jeff Astrof	November 12, 2012	3X7859	5.48
Joe, at Louis' initial insistence, hires Wyatt to be his personal assistant. Joe is surprising happy, but things do not work out the way Louis wants. Meanwhile, Ali is trying to find a caterer for a party at her shop.
7	"Pretty Funny"	David Kohan & Max Mutchnick	April 23, 2013 (in Hungary)	3X7855	N/A
Joe is torn as to where he and Ali should socialize when he realizes that he doesn't fit in with her friends and she doesn't fit in with Louis.
8	"My Best Friend's Wedding Ring"	David Kohan & Max Mutchnick	April 24, 2013 (in Hungary)	3X7856	N/A
After Louis offers Joe his grandmother's ring to give to Ali as her long-awaited engagement ring, he is shocked when a hurt Wyatt objects.
9	"Troubled Water"	Ilana Wernick & John Riggi	April 25, 2013 (in Hungary)	3X7857	N/A
Joe and Louis are contracted to design a house for a big shot in the music business.
10	"Straight Man's Best Friend"	Story by : Lester Lewis; Teleplay by : David Kohan & Max Mutchnick	April 30, 2013 (in Hungary)	3X7860	N/A
Joe tries to hide his new straight friend Russ from Louis.
11	"The Archies"	Ilana Wernick	May 1, 2013 (in Hungary)	3X7861	N/A
Joe and Louis wait to find out if they are nominated for an "Archie" award.
12	"Two Nines and a Pair of Queens"	Jeff Astrof	May 2, 2013 (in Hungary)	3X7862	N/A
Joe and Louis argue about which one is the better looking of the pair. Meanwhile, Ali films a commercial for her store that will air in taxis and Wyatt has a problem with his new driver's license.
13	"Sperm und Drang"	Jeff Astrof	May 7, 2013 (in Hungary)	3X7863	N/A
Ali gets a pregnancy scare, Louis decides to have a baby as well, Joe and Louis' relationship is tested.

== Reception ==
The show has been met with negative reviews with a collective score of 37/100 from Metacritic.

Critics have noted that the CBS show has many similarities to a 1995 Fox sitcom of the same name. Both shows had the same director, concept, characters with similar occupations, similar name for the main female lead, and even timeslot. In addition, Jeff Greenstein, one of the head writers of the Fox series who also worked on Will & Grace with Kohan and Mutchnick, has claimed they were big fans of the show.

== Broadcast ==
Partners aired concurrently in Canada on City via simultaneous substitution of the CBS broadcast.

The complete series was shown on DSTV's M-Net in South Africa from November 2012.

It was later broadcast by HBO Comedy in Bosnia and Herzegovina, Bulgaria, Croatia, the Czech Republic, Hungary, Kosovo, Macedonia, Montenegro, Poland, Romania, Serbia, Slovakia, and Slovenia from March 2013, Zee Cafe in India from October 2013, and TVNZ's TV2 in New Zealand from November 27, 2013, late-night.

The Nine Network in Australia were going to air the series prior to cancellation for their late 2012 to early 2013 season, however delayed the complete series for burning off until December 30, 2013, late-night also airing on Thursdays. Also captioning was converted to teletext subtitling by AI Media, which are made available due to ACMA rules – unlike New Zealand and other countries that have very limited legislated broadcasting rules. The series was preempted during the first week of February 2014.
