= James Burrows =

American television director (1940–2026)

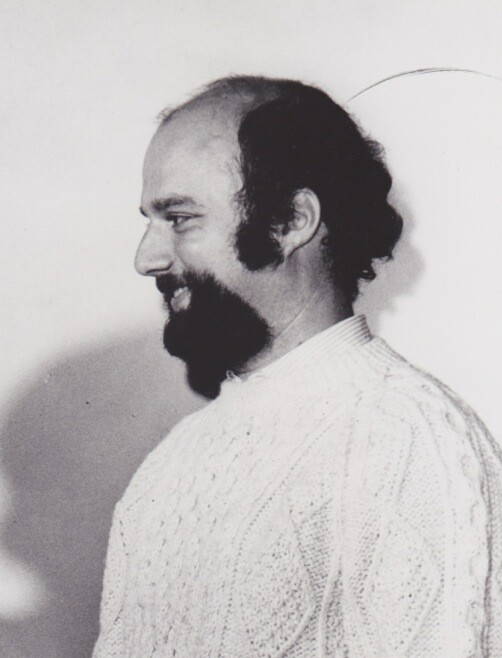
- Burrows in 1970
- Born: James Edward Burrows; December 30, 1940; Los Angeles, California, U.S.
- Died: June 19, 2026 (aged 85); Manhattan, New York City, New York, U.S.
- Other names: Jim Burrows; Jimmy Burrows
- Education: Oberlin College (BA); Yale University (MFA)
- Occupation: Television director
- Years active: 1965–2026
- Notable work: Cheers; Friends; Frasier; Will & Grace; The Mary Tyler Moore Show; Taxi
- Spouses: Linda Solomon (m. 1981; div. 1993) Debbie Easton (m. 1997)
- Children: 4
- Father: Abe Burrows

3 Sisters Entertainment
- Type: Joint venture
- Industry: Television production
- Founded: 1995
- Founder: James Burrows and NBC Productions
- Divisions: 3 Princesses and a P

James Edward Burrows (December 30, 1940 – June 19, 2026) was an American television director. He received numerous accolades, including 11 Primetime Emmy Awards and five Directors Guild of America Awards. He was honored with the Directors Guild of America Lifetime Achievement Award in 2015 and the NBC special Must See TV: An All-Star Tribute to James Burrows in 2016.

Burrows started his career with The Mary Tyler Moore Show in 1974. Burrows directed over 50 television pilots and co-created the television series Cheers (1982–1993). He also formed 3 Sisters Entertainment, a joint venture with NBC. He is known for having directed numerous episodes of comedy shows such as The Bob Newhart Show, Taxi, Frasier, Friends, Will & Grace, and Mike & Molly.

He executive produced the Emmy Award–winning ABC specials Live in Front of a Studio Audience, including Norman Lear's "All in the Family" and "The Jeffersons" in 2019, "All in the Family" and "Good Times" in 2019, and "The Facts of Life" and "Diff'rent Strokes" in 2021. He directed episodes of the revivals of the sitcoms Will & Grace (2017–2020) on NBC and Frasier (2023–2024) on Paramount+.

== Early life and education ==
James Edward Burrows was born on December 30, 1940, to a Jewish family in Los Angeles, California, the son of Ruth (née Levinson) and Abe Burrows, a well-known composer, director, and writer. He had one sister. When Burrows was still a young child, his family moved to New York where Burrows attended New York's High School of Music & Art. Burrows was a graduate of Oberlin College and the graduate program of the Yale School of Drama.

== Career ==
=== 1965–1973: Early career ===
After Yale, Burrows returned to California in 1965 where he became employed as a dialogue coach on O.K. Crackerby!, a television series starring Burl Ives and created by Burrows' father, Abe. Burrows then took a job as an assistant stage manager for the 1967 play Holly Golightly, an adaptation of the novella Breakfast at Tiffany's. The production was unsuccessful, but the job served as Burrows' introduction to its star, Mary Tyler Moore. Early on, Burrows also worked for the road company of Cactus Flower and the Broadway production of Forty Carats. He also went to direct the short lived Broadway play The Castro Complex. Burrows continued working in theater as a stage manager and transitioned into directing plays. Burrows directed traveling plays and a production at a Jacksonville, Florida, dinner theater.

=== 1974–1981: Television director ===
While working in theater, Burrows wrote Moore and her then husband Grant Tinker seeking a job at their production company, MTM Enterprises. In 1974, Tinker hired Burrows as a director for MTM Enterprises where he directed episodes of The Mary Tyler Moore Show and The Bob Newhart Show. Tinker asked director Jay Sandrich, known for his work directing The Mary Tyler Moore Show and later The Cosby Show and The Golden Girls, to serve as a mentor to Burrows.

Burrows is best known for what was his comic timing, complex blocking for actors, and having incorporated more sophisticated lighting in television studio shoots. He is also credited as having been one of the first sitcom directors to increase the typical multi-camera television shoot from three to four cameras. During this time Burrows directed for numerous shows such as Phyllis, Rhoda, Laverne & Shirley, Busting Loose, The Ted Knight Show, The Associates, and On Our Own.

=== 1982–1997: Cheers, Frasier, and Friends ===
Burrows co-created Cheers with brothers Glen and Les Charles. The Charles brothers were also former employees of MTM Enterprises and served as producers on the series Taxi where Burrows worked as in-house director for 76 episodes. Burrows and the Charles brothers wanted to create a show where they could have more control. Cheers premiered on NBC on September 30, 1982. Although Cheers initially struggled in the ratings, the series became a hit, running 275 episodes over eleven seasons. Burrows directed all but 35 of those 275 episodes. During his time on Cheers Burrows also directed episodes for shows such as the NBC sitcoms The Hogan Family, Dear John, and Night Court.

Burrows then gained acclaim for directing the NBC sitcom Frasier. He won the Primetime Emmy Award for Outstanding Directing for a Comedy Series for the pilot "The Good Son" in 1993. Burrows directed in total 32 episodes from 1993 to 1997. The series was a spinoff of Cheers focusing on the character of Dr. Frasier Crane portrayed by Kelsey Grammer. The series also starred David Hyde Pierce, John Mahoney, Peri Gilpin, and Jane Leeves. It received critical acclaim for its writing, directing, and performances. It won five consecutive Primetime Emmy Awards for Outstanding Comedy Series (for seasons 1–5). In 1998, Burrows directed a Chicago-based production of the 1939 comedy The Man Who Came to Dinner starring John Mahoney.

Burrows also directed 15 episodes of another NBC sitcom Friends starring Jennifer Aniston, David Schwimmer, Courteney Cox, Matthew Perry, Matt LeBlanc, and Lisa Kudrow. The series follows six friends living in New York City. He received a nomination for the Primetime Emmy Award for Outstanding Directing for a Comedy Series for the 1994 episode "The One with the Blackout" from Season 1. During this time he also received Emmy nominations for directing the pilot episodes of both the NBC sitcom 3rd Rock from the Sun starring John Lithgow, Kristen Johnston, Joseph Gordon-Levitt, and Jane Curtin, and the ABC sitcom Dharma & Greg starring Jenna Elfman and Thomas Gibson. He also directed episodes of the NBC sitcoms Wings, NewsRadio, Caroline in the City, and the CBS sitcoms Pearl, and George and Leo.

=== 1998–2009: Established director ===
From 1998 to 2006, Burrows directed every episode of the NBC sitcom Will & Grace starring Eric McCormack, Debra Messing, Megan Mullally, and Sean Hayes. Burrows received twelve Primetime Emmy Award nominations for the series winning for Primetime Emmy Award for Outstanding Comedy Series in 2000. He was nominated for directing the episodes "Pilot" (1998), "Homo for the Holidays" (2000), "Lows in the Mid-Eighties" (2001), "A Chorus Lie" (2002), "24" (2003), and "It's a Dad, Dad, Dad, Dad World" (2005). Burrows directed every episode of Will & Grace, both during its initial eight-year run and its later three-year revival.

In 2007, he directed the pilot episode of the Chuck Lorre created CBS sitcom The Big Bang Theory starring Johnny Galecki, Jim Parsons, Kaley Cuoco, Simon Helberg, Kunal Nayyar, Sara Gilbert, and Mayim Bialik. In 2003 he had directed the pilot episode of another Chuck Lorre created CBS sitcom Two and a Half Men starring Charlie Sheen and Jon Cryer. During this time he also directed episodes of shows such as the CBS sitcoms The Class, Courting Alex, and Gary Unmarried, the Fox sitcom Back to You, and the ABC sitcom Hank.

=== 2010–2026: Revivals and recognition ===
Burrows directed high-profile sitcoms during the 2010s including the CBS sitcoms Mike & Molly (2010–2016) starring Billy Gardell and Melissa McCarthy, and The Millers (2013–2015) starring Will Arnett, Margo Martindale, and Beau Bridges. Burrows reunited with Matt LeBlanc with Man with a Plan (2016–2020). He also directed the sitcom B Positive (2020–2022) starring Annaleigh Ashford. Burrows also directed episodes of numerous other television series including the ABC sitcoms Romantically Challenged and Better with You, the CBS sitcoms $#*! My Dad Says, 2 Broke Girls, Partners, Friends with Better Lives, Superior Donuts, and The Neighborhood, the NBC sitcoms Sean Saves the World and Crowded, and the Netflix comedy series Disjointed.

By 2012, Burrows had directed over 50 pilots for television series. Burrows directed over 1,000 episodes of television, a milestone he achieved in November 2015 with the NBC sitcom Crowded. To celebrate Burrows' achievement, NBC aired a special tribute on February 21, 2016, titled Must See TV: An All-Star Tribute to James Burrows featuring cast reunions from many of the series Burrows directed such as Cheers, Taxi, Friends, Frasier, The Big Bang Theory, Will & Grace, and Mike & Molly. In January 2020, Andy Fisher and Burrows won the Directors Guild of America Award for Variety/Talk/News/Sports – Specials for Live in Front of a Studio Audience: Norman Lear's All in the Family and The Jeffersons.

Burrows took part in two revivals of series he had worked on. He directed every episode of the revival of Will & Grace (2017–2020) with the original cast reunited, receiving a nomination for the Primetime Emmy Award for Outstanding Directing for a Comedy Series for the episode "We Love Lucy". In 2023, he directed the first two episodes of the revival of Frasier on Paramount+.

== In front of the camera ==
Burrows had cameo appearances in several of the shows for which he directed. In the first season of Friends, Burrows appeared in the episode "The One with the Butt" as the director of the film in which the character Joey Tribbiani is cast as Al Pacino's "butt double". He appears as a fictionalized version of himself directing the show-within-a-show in the 2005 HBO series The Comeback, as well as its subsequent seasons in 2014 and 2026. An episode of Scrubs, "My Life in Four Cameras", had a character named Charles James in honor of Cheers creators Burrows and Glen and Les Charles. It was previously asserted in Sitcoms: the 101 Greatest TV Comedies of All Time (2007) that Burrows served as the silhouette of the customer who knocks on the door in the final scene of Cheers, but Burrows himself refuted this claim on episode 9 of the NewsRadio-themed podcast Dispatches from Fort Awesome, revealing that the actual "Man Who Knocks" was agent Bob Broder.

== Personal life and death ==
Burrows was married to celebrity hairstylist Debbie Easton; the couple lived together in Manhattan. Burrows had previously been married to Linda Solomon. He had three daughters and one stepdaughter.

Burrows died on June 19, 2026, at the age of 85.

== Filmography ==
=== Acting ===
Television

Year	Title	Role	Notes
1974	Rhoda	Agent	Episode: "The Lady in Red"
1975	Phyllis	Telephone Man	Episode: "Up for Grabs"
1977	The Bob Newhart Show	Maintenance Man	Episode: "Halls of Hartley"
1989	Cheers	Man Standing in the Bar	Uncredited; Episode: "The Art of the Steal"
1994	Friends	Director	Uncredited; Episode: "The One with the Butt"
2005–2026	The Comeback	Himself	Recurring, 8 episodes
2020	Will & Grace	Himself	Episode: "Filthy Phil, Part II"

=== As a director ===
Film

Year	Title	Notes
1982	Partners	Buddy comedy film

Television

Year	Title	Notes	Refs.
1974–1976	The Mary Tyler Moore Show	4 episodes	
1975	Paul Sand in Friends and Lovers	Episode: "From Russia with Lust"	
1975	Fay	2 episodes	
1975–1976	Phyllis	19 episodes	
1975–1977	The Bob Newhart Show	11 episodes	
1976–1977	The Tony Randall Show	4 episodes	
1976–1977	Laverne & Shirley	8 episodes	
1977	Bumpers	Short comedy television film	
1977	Roosevelt and Truman	Short comedy television film	
1977	Calling Doctor Storm, M. D.	Short comedy television film	
1977	Busting Loose	5 episodes	
1977	Szysznyk		
1977	Lou Grant	Episode: "Christmas"	
1977	We've Got Each Other	2 episodes	
1977–1978	Rhoda	4 episodes	
1977–1978	The Betty White Show	2 episodes	
1977–1978	On Our Own		
1978	The Plant Family	Short comedy television film	
1978	Husbands, Wives & Lovers		
1978	Free Country	2 episodes	
1978	More Than Friends	Comedy television film	
1978–82	Taxi	75 episodes	
1979	Butterflies	Short comedy television film	
1979	A New Kind of Family	Episode: "I Do"	
1979–80	The Associates	4 episodes	
1980	The Stockard Channing Show	2 episodes	
1980	Good Time Harry	Episode: "The Wally Smith Story"	
1981	Every Stray Dog and Kid	Short television film	
1981	Best of the West	3 episodes	
1982–93	Cheers	Co-creator of series; Producer from 1982–84; Executive producer from 1985–93; Directed 237 episodes from 1982–93	
1982	Goodbye Doesn't Mean Forever	Television film	
1984	Night Court	Episode: "All You Need Is Love"	
1984	At Your Service	Television film	
1985	Big Shots in America	Television film	
1986	Valerie	Episode: "Old Enough"	
1986	All Is Forgiven	2 episodes; also executive producer	
1987	The Tortellis	Episode: "Pilot"; also executive producer	
1987	CBS Summer Playhouse	Episode: "In the Lion's Den"	
1988	Channel 99	Television film	
1988	Dear John	2 episodes	
1989	Out on the Edge	Television film; Production manager	
1990	Walt Disney's Wonderful World of Color	Episode: "Disneyland's 35th Anniversary Celebration"	
1990	The Marshall Chronicles	2 episodes	
1990	Wings	Episode: "Legacy"	
1990	The Earth Day Special	Cheers segment	
1990	Down Home	2 episodes	
1990	The Fanelli Boys	Episode: "Pilot"	
1991	Roc	Episode: "Pilot"	
1991	Pacific Station	Episode: "Pilot"	
1991	Flesh 'n' Blood	Episode: "Blood Is Thicker Than Arlo"	
1992	Flying Blind	Episode: "Pilot"	
1993	Café Americain	3 episodes	
1993–97	Frasier	32 episodes	
1994	Monty	Episode: "Here Comes the Son"	
1994	The Boys Are Back	Episode: "Pilot"	
1994	Madman of the People	2 episodes	
1994–98	Friends	15 episodes	
1995	The Preston Episodes	Episode: "Pilot"	
1995	Hudson Street	Episode: "Pilot"	
1995–96	Partners	10 episodes	
1995–96	NewsRadio	7 episodes	
1995–98	Caroline in the City		
1996	The Nerd	Television film	
1996	3rd Rock from the Sun	2 episodes	
1996	Pearl	Episode: "Pilot"	
1996–97	Men Behaving Badly	7 episodes	
1997	Chicago Sons	Episode: "Pilot"	
1997	Fired Up		
1997	Veronica's Closet		
1997	George and Leo		
1997–98	Dharma & Greg	2 episodes	
1997–98	Union Square		
1998	Jesse		
1998	Conrad Bloom		
1998	The Secret Lives of Men	Episode: "Pilot"; also executive producer	
1998–2006, 2017–20	Will & Grace	Director; also executive producer	
1999	Ladies Man		
1999	Stark Raving Mad		
2000	Madigan Men		
2000–01	Cursed		
2001	Tikiville	Television film	
2001	Last Dance	Television film	
2002	Good Morning, Miami		
2002	Bram & Alice		
2003	Two and a Half Men	Episode: "Pilot" (and unaired pilot)	
2004	The Stones		
2006	Four Kings		
2006	Teachers		
2006	Courting Alex		
2006–07	The Class	Also executive producer	
2007	The Big Bang Theory	Episode: "The Pilot" (and unaired pilot)	
2007–08	Back to You	Also executive producer	
2008–10	Gary Unmarried	Also executive producer	
2010	Better with You		
2010	$h*! My Dad Says	Episode "Pilot"	
2010–11	Romantically Challenged	Short-lived comedy; also executive producer	
2010–16	Mike & Molly	48 episodes (Season 1–2, 6); also executive producer	
2011	Up All Night		
2011–16	2 Broke Girls	4 episodes	
2012–13	Partners	13 episodes; also executive producer	
2013	Sean Saves the World		
2013–15	The Millers	32 episodes; also executive producer	
2014	Friends with Better Lives	Episode: "Pilot"	
2016	Crowded	9 episodes; also executive producer	
2016–17	Man with a Plan	9 episodes; also executive producer	
2017	Superior Donuts	8 episodes; also executive producer	
2017	Disjointed	2 episodes	
2018	The Neighborhood	Episode: "Pilot"	
2019	Live in Front of a Studio Audience: Norman Lear's "All in the Family" and "The Jeffersons"	Segment director; Television special	
2019	Live in Front of a Studio Audience: "All in the Family" and "Good Times"	Executive producer; Television special	
2020	B Positive	3 episodes	
2020	Raised by Wolves	Executive producer	
2021	Live in Front of a Studio Audience: "The Facts of Life" and "Diff'rent Strokes"	Executive producer; Television special	
2023–24	Frasier	4 episodes	
2025	Mid-Century Modern	10 episodes; also executive producer	

== Pilots directed ==
Burrows became the most notable director of multi-camera sitcom pilots in television history. Pilots he directed include:

Year	Title	Network	Notes
1977	Bumpers	ABC	
1977	Roosevelt and Truman	CBS	
1977	Calling Doctor Storm, M. D.	N/A	
1977	We've Got Each Other	NBC	
1978	Taxi	ABC	
1978	The Plant Family	CBS	
1979	A New Kind of Family	NBC	
1979	The Associates	ABC	
1979	Butterflies	NBC	
1981	Best of the West	ABC	
1982	Cheers	NBC	
1982	Goodbye Doesn't Mean Forever	NBC	
1984	Night Court	NBC	
1984	At Your Service	NBC	
1985	Big Shots in America	NBC	
1986	Valerie	NBC	
1986	All Is Forgiven	NBC	
1987	The Tortellis	NBC	
1987	Dear John	NBC	
1989	The Marshall Chronicles	ABC	
1989	Wings	NBC	
1989	Down Home	NBC	
1989	The Fanelli Boys	NBC	
1991	Roc	Fox	
1991	Pacific Station	NBC	
1991	Flesh 'n' Blood	NBC	
1992	Flying Blind	Fox	
1993	Café Americain	NBC	
1993	Frasier	NBC	Original series
1994	Monty	Fox	
1994	The Boys Are Back	CBS	
1994	Madman of the People	NBC	
1994	Friends	NBC	
1995	The Preston Episodes	Fox	
1995	Hudson Street	ABC	
1995	Partners	Fox	
1995	NewsRadio	NBC	
1995	Caroline in the City	NBC	
1996	3rd Rock from the Sun	NBC	
1996	Pearl	CBS	
1996	Men Behaving Badly	NBC	
1997	Chicago Sons	NBC	
1997	Fired Up	NBC	
1997	Veronica's Closet	NBC	
1997	George and Leo	CBS	
1997	Dharma & Greg	ABC	
1997	Union Square	NBC	Original unaired pilot
1997	Union Square	NBC	Second pilot
1998	Jesse	NBC	
1998	Conrad Bloom	NBC	
1998	The Secret Lives of Men	ABC	
1998	Will & Grace	NBC	Original series
1999	Ladies Man	CBS	
1999	Stark Raving Mad	NBC	
2000	Madigan Men	ABC	
2000	Cursed	NBC	
2001	Tikiville	NBC	
2001	Last Dance	NBC	
2002	Good Morning, Miami	NBC	
2002	Bram & Alice	CBS	
2003	Two and a Half Men	CBS	Original unaired pilot
2003	Two and a Half Men	CBS	Second pilot
2004	The Stones	CBS	
2006	Four Kings	NBC	
2006	Teachers	NBC	
2006	Courting Alex	CBS	Original unaired pilot
2006	The Class	CBS	
2006	The Big Bang Theory	CBS	Original unaired pilot
2007	The Big Bang Theory	CBS	Second pilot
2007	Back to You	ABC	
2010	Better with You	ABC	
2010	$h*! My Dad Says	CBS	
2010	Romantically Challenged	ABC	
2010	Mike & Molly	CBS	
2011	Up All Night	NBC	
2011	2 Broke Girls	CBS	
2012	Partners	CBS	
2013	Sean Saves the World	NBC	
2013	The Millers	CBS	
2014	Friends with Better Lives	NBC	
2016	Crowded	NBC	
2016	Man with a Plan	CBS	
2017	Superior Donuts	CBS	
2017	Will & Grace	NBC	Revival series
2017	Disjointed	Netflix	
2018	The Neighborhood	CBS	
2020	B Positive	CBS	
2020	Raised by Wolves	CBS	
2023	Frasier	Paramount+	Revival series
2025	Mid-Century Modern	Hulu	

== Awards and nominations ==
Over the course of his career, Burrows was nominated for fifteen Directors Guild of America awards, and for an Emmy Award every year between 1980 and 2005, excluding 1997. Burrows won 11 Emmy Awards and five Directors Guild of America Awards. The Academy of Television Arts and Sciences celebrated Burrows' forty-year career by hosting a panel in his honor on October 7, 2013.

== Bibliography ==
- Directed by James Burrows: Five Decades of Stories from the Legendary Director of Taxi, Cheers, Frasier, Friends, Will & Grace, and More (Ballantine Books, 2022)
