= Good Morning, Miami =

- Original cast
- Genre: Sitcom
- Created by: David Kohan; Max Mutchnick
- Starring: Mark Feuerstein; Ashley Williams; Matt Letscher; Jere Burns; Tessie Santiago; Constance Zimmer; Brooke Dillman; Suzanne Pleshette
- Opening theme: "Once in a Lifetime" performed by John Rzeznik
- Composers: Rich Ragsdale; Jonathan Wolff
- Country of origin: United States
- Original language: English
- No. of seasons: 2
- No. of episodes: 39 (9 unaired)

Production
- Executive producers: David Kohan; James Burrows; Max Mutchnick; Erik Durbin; Bill Prady; Jim Patterson; Kirk J. Rudell
- Producers: Tim Kaiser; Mark Feuerstein; Jonathan Goldstein
- Camera setup: Multi camera
- Running time: 23 minutes
- Production companies: KoMut Entertainment; Warner Bros. Television

Original release
- Network: NBC
- Release: September 26, 2002 – December 18, 2003

Good Morning, Miami is an American sitcom created by David Kohan and Max Mutchnick. The series ran on NBC from September 26, 2002, to December 18, 2003, and centered around the personal and professional life of Jake (Mark Feuerstein), the executive producer of an incredibly low-rated morning show in Miami, Florida. The series was one of the first on NBC to be fully originated in high definition.

The series was launched as a part of the network's highly-rated "Must See TV" lineup, where it struggled in the ratings when compared to other sitcoms in the lineup, such as Kohan and Mutchnick's own Will & Grace. Midway through the second season, NBC pulled the series after Kohan and Mutchnick sued the network. The series never returned, and the final nine episodes were ultimately left unaired. These episodes were later shown on TG4 in Ireland and Channel 4 in the United Kingdom.

== Synopsis ==
Wunderkind producer Jake Silver decides to accept the job leading the lowest-rated morning show in Miami. He falls in love with the show's beautiful, down-to-earth hairdresser, Dylan. The carnival of clowns at the station includes pompous and insulting on-air host Gavin; Jake's sardonic assistant, Penny; and highly insecure station manager, Frank.

Early in the first season, Gavin's morning co-host was Lucia, and Sister Brenda was the station's nun/weather-girl. Eventually, Jake's foul-mouthed grandmother, Claire, becomes the on-screen co-host. Both Lucia and Sister Brenda were written out early in the series as the producers were still searching for the "center" of their program.

During the second season, Jake and Dylan begin a relationship, even considering relocation to New York together. Victoria Hill, a new station boss, took over the show to get higher ratings, and Gavin struggled to warm up to her. Claire left the show and a new weather girl, Joni, was also introduced—much to Gavin's dismay.

The series ended with Gavin and Penny deciding to start a relationship (as Penny is pregnant with his baby), Frank marrying Gavin's mother as a publicity stunt, and Jake and Dylan agreeing to go their separate ways (Jake leaves the station and goes to produce at NBC in Manhattan, while Dylan returns to her home town of Omaha, Nebraska).

== Cast and characters ==
=== Main ===
- Mark Feuerstein - Jake Silver
- Ashley Williams as Dylan Messinger
- Matt Letscher - Gavin Stone
- Constance Zimmer - Penelope "Penny" Barnes Barrington
- Jere Burns as Frank Jennifer Alfano
- Tessie Santiago as Lucia Rojas-Klein, Gavin's morning co-host (episodes 1–11)
- Brooke Dillman as Sister Brenda Trogman, a nun who is also the station's weather girl (episodes 1–11)
- Suzanne Pleshette as Claire Arnold Silver, Jake's grandmother (season 1)

=== Recurring ===
- Stephon Fuller as Robby
- Tiffani Thiessen as Victoria Hill, a new station boss in season two
- Jillian Barberie as Joni, the station's new weather girl in season two
- Bob Clendenin as Carl, a station camera man
- Tracy Vilar as Stacey
- Edward James Gage as Tiny, the station helicopter pilot
- Fran Drescher as Roberta, the new talent agent

=== Guest stars ===
- Andrea Savage as Cindy, Dylan's best friend
- Bess Armstrong as Louise Messinger, Dylan's Mother
- Tom Poston as Lenny, Claire's maintenance man
- Nick Offerman as Officer Nick, a police officer
- Mary Lynn Rajskub as Hollis
- John Aylward as Mr Fowler
- Carrie Fisher as Judy Silver, Jake's Mother
- Hal Holbrook as Jim Templeton
- Curtis Armstrong as Milton, a jewelry store owner
- Valerie Mahaffey as Sara, Frank's ex-wife
- Joanna Cassidy as Catherine Stone, Gavin's Mother
- George Wyner as Larry, Jake's network boss

== Production ==
The sitcom was filmed at CBS Studio Center's Stage 16. The theme song, entitled "Once in a Lifetime", is played by John Rzeznik of the Goo Goo Dolls. In the second season, exterior footage of NBC affiliate WPTV-TV's studio complex in West Palm Beach, Florida (68 miles north of Miami), was used to portray the exteriors of the fictional Good Morning, Miami studios.

In the original, unaired test Pilot the part of Gavin was played by actor Burke Moses. The part of Penny was played by an uncredited actress and the character was completely different.

== Episodes ==
=== Series overview ===
During the original run of the series, the first episodes were broadcast out of intended production order by NBC as the series struggled in the ratings. First, completely discarding the episode titled, "It Didn't Happen One Night," then failing to run the Christmas themed episode until the second week of January, after first running another new episode during the first week of January.

Despite renewing the series, only half of the second season was ever broadcast in the United States by NBC. The entire series was aired on TG4 in Ireland several times in a daily morning time slot. Channel 4 UK also broadcast the entire series.

Season	Episodes	Originally released	
Season	Episodes	First released	Last released
1	21	September 26, 2002	April 17, 2003
2	18	September 30, 2003	December 18, 2003

=== Season 1 (2002–03) ===
No. overall	No. in season	Title	Directed by	Written by	Original release date	Prod. code	Viewers (millions)
1	1	"Pilot"	James Burrows	David Kohan & Max Mutchnick	September 26, 2002	475189	17.45
Jake comes to Miami, meets Dylan and the rest of the crew of Good Morning Miami, and nearly fires Gavin.
2	2	"Power Failure"	Terry Hughes	David Kohan & Max Mutchnik	October 3, 2002	175551	16.04
Jake sets out to change the show but his power to delegate is tested after Frank gets "a Lotto set" instead of "a lot of set" for the show.
3	3	"The Way to Dylan's Heart"	David Trainer	David Kohan & Max Mutchnik	October 10, 2002	175556	16.30
Dylan and Gavin go on a double date with Dylan's best friend Cindy (Andrea Savage) and Jake, while Frank, Penny and Lucia are asked to create a PSA for the deaf but accidentally sign the wrong message.
4	4	"Swan Jake"	David Trainer	David Kohan & Max Mutchnik	October 17, 2002	175554	15.48
After getting stuck spending some time with Gavin, they both realize they have things in common, meanwhile the ladies engage in some "Girl Talk," but Frank misinterprets Penny's sarcasm.
5	5	"The Heart is a Lonely Apartment Hunter"	Terry Hughes	Jamie Gorenberg	October 24, 2002	175552	12.07
Jake is cramping Grandma Claire's style so she gives him until the end of the week to find his own apartment, Dylan offers her vacant apartment since she is moving in with Gavin but Jake is reluctant.
6	6	"Kiss of the Spiderman"	David Trainer	Kirk J. Rudell	October 31, 2002	175555	14.33
Dylan accidentally kisses Jake at a costume party after Jake and Gavin are both disguised as The Flash, Sister Brenda pranks Lucia, and Frank's gaydar is permanently down for maintenance. Note: Halloween Themed Episode 1/2
7	7	"Penny Wise, Jake Foolish"	Steve Zuckerman	Richard Day	November 14, 2002	175557	14.78
On Jake's birthday tensions are high between Dylan and Penny, Sister Brenda and Frank attend their uncle Leon's funeral then fight over a pocket watch, meanwhile Lucia gets Gavin addicted to gum. Dylan picks up on something.
8	8	"If It's Not One Thing, It's a Mother"	David Trainer	David Kohan & Max Mutchnik	December 5, 2002	175559	15.58
After meeting Gavin, Dylan's mom (Bess Armstrong) prefers Jake, and before leaving, Lucia convinces Frank to get his dignity back after he has an unfortunate incident with the copy machine.
9	9	"I'm With Stupid"	David Owen Trainor	Richard Day	December 12, 2002	175560	13.45
Jake offends Dylan after he says spirituality is for idiots, Gavin wants Claire to take over Lucia's job, Sister Brenda delivers her final report.
10	10	"Hi, My Name Is Jake"	David Trainer	Jeanette Collins & Mimi Friedman	January 2, 2003	175558	10.00
Jake and Gavin are in a heated competition to see who's the bigger man, Jake even pretends to be an alcoholic just to out do Gavin. Frank is a regular at the ER and he is using Penny as his emergency contact.
11	11	"Jake's Nuts Roasting on an Open Fire"	David Trainer	Tad Quill	January 9, 2003	175561	13.02
The crew exchange secret Santa gifts, Jake scrambles after his personalized inscription to Dylan ends up with Gavin, Frank acts like a little kid after helping with Claire's gift for Jake. Note: Christmas Themed Episode broadcast in January
12	12	"Mee So Torny"	David Trainer	Darlene Hunt	January 16, 2003	175562	14.23
Gavin starts a rumor to keep Dylan and Jake apart, Claire figures out that Penny likes Jake, Frank is employee of the month so he needs a haircut, Jake kisses Penny just as Dylan finally has a realization.
13	13	"Take a Penny, Leave a Penny"	Max Mutchnick	Kirk J. Rudell	January 23, 2003	175563	11.33
Jake and Penny try to hide their relationship, Claire is carrying on with her maintenance man Lenny (Tom Poston), Frank won't take no for an answer thanks to Dylan's advice. Gavin needs a friend.
14	14	"Mutt and Jake"	Peter Bonerz	David S. Rosenthal	February 27, 2003	175564	11.86
Dylan and Gavin can't agree on which dog to adopt that symbolizes their commitment, and Jake and Penny can't have a relationship at Dylan's apartment.
15	15	"The Big Leap"	Peter Bonerz	Jonathan Goldstein	March 6, 2003	175565	9.28
Some of the crew go skydiving after Gavin accidentally eats Frank's special pear, Claire is using Dylan's picture for her online dating profile, Jake thinks he should probably be with Penny.
16	16	"Fear and Loathing in Miami"	Peter Bonerz	Unknown	March 13, 2003	175566	12.57
Gavin loses his dignity on Fear Factor after he signs with a new talent agent Roberta (Fran Drescher), Frank reveals to Penny that he doesn't actually do anything at the station except look busy. Penny still has feelings for Jake, but denies being a relationship with him. But a conversation with Dylan changes everything.
17	17	"About a Ploy"	Steve Zuckerman	Jason Clodfelter & Christopher Fife	March 20, 2003	175568	12.74
Penny and Claire have a fender bender then Frank takes the blame in front of the police officer (Nick Offerman), Gavin's contact is up and Jake sees it as the perfect opportunity to break up Gavin and Dylan.
18	18	"Three Weeks Notice"	Linda Day	Jim Patterson & Steve Leff	March 27, 2003	175567	11.63
Dylan and Gavin break up, Frank is having body image issues, Jake has to hold off before making a move when Dylan wants to move back into her apartment. Roberta (Fran Drescher) brings Gavin to an exclusive AA meeting to network with big time movers and shakers but he can't handle it. Jake has to save Gavin from himself.
19	19	"Someone to Watch Over Gavin"	Peter Bonerz	Unknown	April 3, 2003	175569	11.62
Gavin can't snap out of it for the sake of the show, so Jake pays Penny to babysit Gavin while he goes out with Dylan. Claire's exploits end up in the tabloids thanks to Frank, Gavin ends up faking it.
20	20	"The Slow and the Furious"	Steve Zuckerman	Unknown	April 10, 2003	175570	9.97
Part 1/2 To get a date with Dylan, Jake first sets up a dating segment to get Gavin a date, but Gavin proposes to Dylan instead during the show. Frank encourages Claire to see her old friend in the hospital.
21	21	"One Flu Over the Cuckold's Nest"	Steve Zuckerman	Richard Day	April 17, 2003	175571	13.23
Part 2/2 Dylan needs time to think over Gavin's proposal, Claire and Frank can't keep it together during their appearance on a PSA for the influenza shot. Penny tells Jake, "I love you," and then quits. Jake tells Dylan, "I'm in love with You," but things go awry there. Penny and Gavin have dinner together and end up consoling each other. Gavin and Penny kiss. Jake runs after Penny and Dylan runs after Jake. To Be Continued...

=== Season 2 (2003) ===
No. overall	No. in season	Title	Directed by	Written by	Original release date	Prod. code	Viewers (millions)
22	1	"The New Good Morning, Miami"	Peter Bonerz	Bill Prady	September 30, 2003	177301	8.68
Part 1/2 The new couples Jake and Dylan, and Gavin and Penny, consummate their new relationships which leaves Frank feeling left out. The show gets a new revolving set and logo after a corporate conglomerate, Sunbright Media, buys the station and sends a new boss, Victoria, to Miami to improve the ratings of the show.
23	2	"Good Morning, Manhattan"	Peter Bonerz	Kirk J. Rudell	October 7, 2003	177302	8.98
Part 2/2 Jake and Dylan move to NY after Jake quits his job, Victoria takes over as Executive Producer with disastrous results, Jake see the results and develops a guilty conscience about his move and then decides to return to Miami. The team strikes to get Jake back as Executive Producer, A new weather girl Joni joins the crew.
24	3	"I Second That Promotion"	Steve Zuckerman	Tad Quill	October 14, 2003	177304	8.18
Jake promotes Dylan to producer then micro-manages her. Gavin makes a fool out of himself when he doesn't know how to pronounce Beyoncé. Frank tries to impress a caterer named Hollis (Mary Lynn Rajskub).
25	4	"With Friends Like These, Who Needs Emmys?"	Peter Bonerz	Jonathan Goldstein	October 21, 2003	177303	7.33
Gavin receives recognition as the most improved on-air personality then runs into Victoria at an AA meeting, later Gavin becomes an investigative reporter. Dylan discovers Penny's past.
26	5	"The Ex Games"	Steve Zuckerman	Unknown	October 28, 2003	177305	8.70
Dylan reveals she has an ex-husband to Jake meanwhile Frank and Penny go to a holiday costume party. Note: Halloween Themed Episode 2/2
27	6	"Will You Still Leave Me Tomorrow?"	Steve Zuckerman	Nahnatchka Khan	November 11, 2003	177306	8.53
Victoria helps Dylan negotiate the best deal at a car dealer. Gavin is unsure about his relationship with Penny.
28	7	"A Kiss Before Lying"	Steve Zuckerman	Bill Prady	November 18, 2003	177309	8.75
An old family friend Mr Fowler (John Aylward) kisses Dylan and creeps out Jake. Jake is caught in a lie when his mother Judy (Carrie Fisher) visits and Frank is asked to fill in during the holiday. Note: Thanksgiving Themed Episode
29	8	"Her Place or Mine?"	Peter Bonerz	David Babcock	December 11, 2003	177307	11.34
Victoria fights with Jake over a place on a corporate retreat trip, a parking spot, and an apartment that Dylan saw first, Gavin's investments dry up and he gets a job doing a cartoon voice.
30	9	"Looking For Love in All the Wrong Cages"	Steve Zuckerman	Kirk J. Rudell	December 18, 2003	177310	10.03
Frank can't take a hint when he falls for a Zookeeper, meanwhile Gavin uses a stolen hole punch to get free coffee at Star Beans.
31	10	"You Bet Your Relationship"	Steve Zuckerman	Nahnatchka Khan and Amanda Lasher	Unaired	177311	N/A
Everyone in the station has a pool on whether or not Jake and Dylan will last, and everyone loses. Gavin and Penny bring separate dates to a dinner party held by Jake and Dylan. Gavin's date happens to be born to be a news anchor and Penny's is a total flake. Meanwhile, Frank babysits his Nephew at the party, but it is actually Frank who needs the babysitter since he is acting like a baby when he needs a spoon for his ice cream during a fight between Dylan and Jake.
32	11	"Subterranean Workplace Blues"	Peter Bonerz	Jonathan Goldstein and John Quaintance	Unaired	177308	N/A
The station cuts corners to get new computers and Victoria banishes the staff to the basement after Jake goes over her head to get them and tells the Sunbright Ceo Jim Templeton (Hal Holbrook).
33	12	"Nightmare at 2000 Feet"	Peter Bonerz	Jonathan Goldstein and John Quaintance	Unaired	177312	N/A
The station's helicopter crashes in the Everglades during a storm and they are forced to communicate their location to Frank live on the air since he accidentally trapped Jake and Penny inside a magic box.
34	13	"Victoria's Secret"	Peter Bonerz	N/A	Unaired	177313	N/A
Victoria is fired but keeps coming to work anyway, Gavin does the sports segment, Penny trains Frank in self defense after he was mugged.
35	14	"A Sample Plan"	Asaad Kelada	N/A	Unaired	177314	N/A
Frank gets caught in a scam by an old women that Penny warns him about. The station employees are drug tested, Dylan is mistakenly told she is pregnant but it's actually Frank who has high estrogen levels, meanwhile Jake spars with a jeweler played by (Curtis Armstrong) while trying to buy an engagement ring for Dylan.
36	15	"Gays and Confused"	Peter Bonerz	David Babcock	Unaired	177315	N/A
Gavin is feeling sorry for himself and everything he says seems like he is coming out of the closet. While Frank's ex-wife Sara (Valerie Mahaffey) is back and everyone is confused by the injuries Frank sustains from magic tricks gone awry.
37	16	"The Return of the Ring"	Peter Bonerz	Erik Durbin	Unaired	177316	N/A
Part 1/3 Gavin hosts a show about teenagers and sex. A video tape labeled X-Files turns out to be a sex tape. Dylan expects Jake to propose but he has given up.
38	17	"The Wait Problem"	Steve Zuckerman	Tad Quill	Unaired	177317	N/A
Part 2/3 Jake and Dylan wonder if they should wait to get married. Gavin's mom Catherine (Joanna Cassidy) visits town. Dylan accidentally advises Jake's Ex Cheryl (Jolie Jenkins) to profess her love for him. Jake finally proposes to Dylan. Frank starts dating Gavin's Mom.
39	18	"Three Ring Circus"	Steve Zuckerman	Kirk J. Rudell	Unaired	177318	N/A
Part 3/3 The show is being canceled and as a final rating stunt Jake's network boss Larry (George Wyner) comes to town and turns Jake and Dylan's wedding into a circus, so they both run out on the wedding. Gavin and Penny tell each other, "I love you." Penny finds out whether or not she is pregnant. Frank becomes Gavin's father at an on-air wedding ceremony officiated by Reverend Earl (Shashawnee Hall). Jake and Dylan are headed to the airport to do what they need to do. Note: This episode contains a parting shot at NBC. In his office, Jake tells his network boss Larry, "you've never given us a fair shake, you've moved us around the schedule, you've taken us off for months at a time, you barely promoted us." Larry responds that he will replace the show with a new concept called Something Factor, a direct barb against this show's replacement, Fear Factor.
