= Boston Common (TV series) =

American television sitcom

- Genre: Sitcom
- Created by: Max Mutchnick; David Kohan
- Starring: Anthony Clark; Traylor Howard; Hedy Burress; Steve Paymer; Roger Rees; Tasha Smith; Vincent Ventresca
- Music by: Jonathan Wolff
- Country of origin: United States
- Original language: English
- No. of seasons: 2
- No. of episodes: 32

Production
- Executive producers: David Kohan; Max Mutchnick
- Camera setup: Multi-camera
- Running time: 30 minutes
- Production companies: KoMut Entertainment; Castle Rock Entertainment; Columbia TriStar Television

Original release
- Network: NBC
- Release: March 21, 1996 – April 28, 1997

Boston Common is an American television sitcom created by David Kohan and Max Mutchnick that aired on NBC from March 21, 1996, to April 28, 1997. In its first season, it ranked 8th for the year, with a 15.6 household rating, but with a move to Sundays in its second season, it dropped to 52nd place.

== Plot ==
Boyd Pritchett is a genial, easy-going twenty-something from Virginia who delivers his sister Wyleen to college in Boston. Then Boyd falls in love with Joy and decides to stay, much to Wyleen's dismay. Boyd eventually gets a job at the college to help pay his sister's tuition and shares an apartment with Wyleen whose inclination is to be sexually active, but Boyd tries to inspire her with his chaste pursuit of Joy.

== Characters ==
=== Main ===
- Anthony Clark as Boyd Pritchett
- Hedy Burress as Wyleen Pritchett
- Traylor Howard as Joy Byrnes
- Tasha Smith as Tasha King
- Steve Paymer as Leonard Prince
- Vincent Ventresca as Professor Jack Reed (Patrick Fabian in season 1, episode 1)
- Roger Rees as President Harrison Cross (season 2)

=== Recurring ===
- Sam Anderson as President Wesley Butterfield
- Margot Kidder as Cookie de Varen
- Zach Galifianakis as Bobby
- D.C. Douglas as D.C.

=== Guest stars ===
- Robin Duke as Brenda Nidorf
- Leah Lail as Anna
- Larry Miller as Warren
- Shelley Long as Louise Holmes

== Episodes ==
=== Series overview ===
Season	Episodes	Originally released	
Season	Episodes	First released	Last released
1	10	March 21, 1996	September 15, 1996
2	22	September 29, 1996	April 28, 1997

=== Season 1 (1996) ===
No. overall	No. in season	Title	Directed by	Written by	Original release date	Prod. code	US viewers (millions)
1	1	"Pilot"	James Widdoes	David Kohan & Max Mutchnick	March 21, 1996	110101	26.0
2	2	"Out, Out, Damn Jack!"	James Widdoes	David Kohan & Max Mutchnick	March 28, 1996	110102	27.7
3	3	"I Thee Endow"	James Widdoes	David Kohan & Max Mutchnick	April 4, 1996	110103	23.3
4	4	"Relationship of Fools"	James Widdoes	Jenji Kohan	April 11, 1996	110104	20.4
5	5	"Boyd Gets Shrunk"	Tom Cherones	Barry Wernick	April 18, 1996	110105	20.5
6	6	"Virginia Reeling"	James Widdoes	David Kohan & Max Mutchnick	April 25, 1996	110106	21.9
7	7	"Hope Springs a Leak"	James Widdoes	David Kohan & Max Mutchnick	August 11, 1996	110107	10.9
8	8	"Autumn Foliage"	James Widdoes	Ari Posner & Eric Preven	August 18, 1996	110109	12.2
9	9	"Everybody's Stalking"	James Widdoes	Barry Wernick	September 8, 1996	110108	10.4
10	10	"A Streetcar Named Denial"	Jimmy Hampton	Julia Newton	September 15, 1996	110201	15.0

=== Season 2 (1996–97) ===
No. overall	No. in season	Title	Directed by	Written by	Original release date	Prod. code	US viewers (millions)
11	1	"Everything's Coming Up Sub-Rosas"	Jimmy Hampton	Kari Lizer	September 29, 1996	110110	17.6
12	2	"Conspiracy of Dunces"	Rod Daniel	Bill Canterbury	October 6, 1996	110203	15.4
13	3	"This Ain't No Party, This Ain't No Disco..."	Jimmy Hampton	Kevin Rooney	October 13, 1996	110202	13.0
14	4	"Mercury Retrograde"	Rod Daniel	Kari Lizer	October 20, 1996	110204	15.0
15	5	"The War Room"	Max Tash	Michael Feldman	October 27, 1996	110206	12.9
16	6	"Trustee and Sympathy"	Brian K. Roberts	Ari Posner & Eric Preven	November 3, 1996	110205	14.8
17	7	"A Triage Grows in Boston"	Max Tash	Bill Canterbury & Barry Wernick	November 10, 1996	110207	15.1
18	8	"Gobble, Gobble, Aggch!"	Brian K. Roberts	Bill Canterbury	November 17, 1996	110208	16.1
19	9	"Coming Clean"	Jimmy Hampton	Julia Newton	November 20, 1996	110209	10.3
20	10	"Arts and Craftiness"	Jimmy Hampton	Barry Wernick	December 8, 1996	110210	12.2
21	11	"The Finals Curtain"	Jimmy Hampton	Andrew J. Golden & Gregory V. Sherman	December 15, 1996	110211	15.2
22	12	"Soup to Nuts"	Philip Charles MacKenzie	David Kohan & Max Mutchnick	January 5, 1997	110212	15.16
23	13	"A Night in Camelot"	Philip Charles MacKenzie	Ari Posner & Eric Preven	February 16, 1997	110213	14.77
24	14	"Commander-in-Grief"	James Widdoes	Joe Fisch	March 9, 1997	110215	13.53
25	15	"His and Herpes"	James Widdoes	Kari Lizer	March 16, 1997	110216	12.58
26	16	"Extra Credit"	Tom Moore	Barry Wernick	March 23, 1997	110217	12.56
27	17	"The Occidental Purists"	Philip Charles MacKenzie	Bill Canterbury	April 6, 1997	110218	9.88
28	18	"Here's to You, Mrs. Byrnes"	Linda Day	David Kohan & Max Mutchnick	April 7, 1997	110214	9.48
29	19	"I.D. Endow"	Philip Charles MacKenzie	Dean Ollins & David Charles Friedman	April 13, 1997	110219	9.46
30	20	"To Bare is Human"	David Trainer	Michael Feldman	April 14, 1997	110220	8.97
31	21	"A Cross to Bear"	Jimmy Hampton	Rebecca Parr	April 20, 1997	110221	9.50
32	22	"Sophomore's Choice"	Jimmy Hampton	Story by : Jed Elinoff & Hugh Webber; Teleplay by : David Kohan & Max Mutchnick	April 28, 1997	110222	10.12
