= Max Mutchnick =

American television producer (born 1965)

- Born: Jason Nidorf Mutchnick; November 11, 1965 (age 60); Chicago, Illinois, U.S.
- Education: Emerson College ( B.S.)
- Occupations: Television producer, writer
- Spouse: Erik Hyman (m. 2008)
- Children: 2

Jason Nidorf "Max" Mutchnick (born November 11, 1965) is an American television producer. He has received an Emmy Award, a People's Choice Award, and several Golden Globe Award nominations.

== Early life and education ==
Mutchnick was born in Chicago, Illinois, and raised in Beverly Hills by his single mother, who is Jewish. He graduated with a Bachelor of Science from Emerson College in 1987.

== Career ==
Mutchnick's career in Hollywood started when he began writing for game shows and the sitcoms Good Advice and The Wonder Years. Along with David Kohan, he created Boston Common and Will & Grace. Mutchnick produced and wrote for Good Morning, Miami, and produced Twins and Four Kings, also with Kohan. The title characters of Will & Grace, Will Truman and Grace Adler, are based on Mutchnick and his best friend, Janet. Mutchnick, like Will Truman, is openly gay. He and Kohan have a production company, KoMut Entertainment, which is a combination of their two last names.

On June 7, 2006, Emerson College announced the naming of the Max Mutchnick Campus Center following Mutchnick's donation of a major financial gift. A recreation of the on-set apartment of characters Will Truman and Grace Adler was placed on display in the Emerson College Library until the 2013 completion of Emerson's Los Angeles Campus, to which place it was relocated.

Mutchnick and Kohan created a half-hour comedy series for CBS called Partners in 2012, but was canceled that same year.

== Personal life ==
Mutchnick married his husband, lawyer Erik Hyman, on October 25, 2008. The couple are fathers to twin girls born in 2008 via a surrogate.

== Filmography ==
Year	Title	Writer	Executive producer	Notes	Network
1993–1994	Good Advice	Yes	No		CBS
1995–1996	The Single Guy	No	No	Co-producer	NBC
1996–1997	Boston Common	No	Yes		NBC
1998–2006, 2017–2020	Will & Grace	Yes	Yes	Writers of 23 episodes	NBC
2002–2003	Good Morning, Miami	Yes	Yes	Writers of 3 episodes Director of 1 episode	NBC
2004	The Stones	Yes	Yes		CBS
2005–2006	Twins	Yes	Yes		The WB
2006	Four Kings	Yes	Yes		NBC
2010–2011	$#*! My Dad Says	Yes	Yes		CBS
2012–2013	Partners	Yes	Yes		CBS
2015	Clipped	Yes	Yes	Writers of 8 episodes	TBS
2020	Wilde Things	Yes	Yes	Pilot	CBS
2025	Mid-Century Modern	Yes	Yes	Writers of 10 episodes	Hulu
