= David Kohan =

American television producer and writer

- Born: David Sanford Kohan; April 16, 1964 (age 62); New York City, U.S.
- Education: Wesleyan University (1986)
- Occupations: Television producer, writer
- Spouse: Blair Kohan
- Children: 2
- Parent(s): Buz Kohan; Rhea Kohan
- Relatives: Jenji Kohan (sister); Christopher Noxon (brother-in-law)

David Sanford Kohan (born April 16, 1964) is an American television producer and writer. After writing for The Wonder Years and The Dennis Miller Show, Kohan co-created and produced Will & Grace, Boston Common, Good Morning, Miami, Twins and Four Kings with Max Mutchnick. Kohan has won an Emmy and a People's Choice Award. He has been nominated for a Golden Globe Award. He and his business partner Max Mutchnick worked on a half-hour comedy series for CBS called Partners.

== Biography ==
Kohan was born to a Jewish family in New York City and graduated from Wesleyan University in 1986. He is the son of writer Buz Kohan and novelist Rhea Kohan and the brother of writer/producer Jenji Kohan. He also has a twin brother, Jono.

Kohan and Mutchnick formed a name with their two last names: KoMut Entertainment, which would be the name of the company they own, making Boston Common, Will & Grace, $#*! My Dad Says and Partners. In 1999, it signed a deal with Warner Bros. Television.

On December 11, 2003, NBC filed a lawsuit against Kohan and Mutchnick, claiming that they had failed to negotiate a contract and a licensee fee for Will & Grace. Both sides were settled on April 29, 2007.

He is married to Blair Kohan, a partner and motion picture agent at UTA, and has two daughters.

== Filmography ==
Year	Title	Writer	Executive producer	Notes	Network
1993–1994	Good Advice	Yes	No		CBS
1995–1996	The Single Guy	No	No	Co-producer	NBC
1996–1997	Boston Common	Yes	Yes		NBC
1998–2006, 2017–2020	Will & Grace	Yes	Yes	Writers of 23 episodes	NBC
2002–2003	Good Morning, Miami	Yes	Yes	Writers of 3 episodes Director of 1 episode	NBC
2004	The Stones	Yes	Yes		CBS
2005–2006	Twins	Yes	Yes		The WB
2006	Four Kings	Yes	Yes		NBC
2010–2011	$#*! My Dad Says	Yes	Yes		CBS
2012–2013	Partners	Yes	Yes		CBS
2015	Clipped	Yes	Yes	Writers of 8 episodes	TBS
2020	Wilde Things	Yes	Yes	Pilot	CBS
2025	Mid-Century Modern	Yes	Yes	Writers of 4 episodes	Hulu
