= Small Town (Sports Night) =

- Sports Night episode
- Episode no.: Season 1 Episode 13
- Directed by: Thomas Schlamme
- Written by: Aaron Sorkin; Paul Redford
- Production code: 1-13
- Original air date: January 12, 1999

Guest appearances
- Alicia Coppola as Leesa; Lisa Edelstein as Bobbi Bernstein; Amy Powell as Kelly Kirtpatrick; Lisa Weli as Redhead; Brett Barrett as waiter

Episode chronology
← Previous "Smoky"	Next → "Rebecca"
- Sports Night (season 1)

"Small Town" is the thirteenth episode of the first season of the television series Sports Night, written by Aaron Sorkin and Paul Redford, and directed by Thomas Schlamme, premiered on ABC in the United States on January 12, 1999.

In the episode, Dana and Casey are supposed to take the night off but are reluctant to do so. They choose to have a double date, Dana with Gordon and Casey with blind date Lisa. Natalie is left to produce the show for the first time, and has to handle a late trade, and Isaac and Jeremy question her authority amongst the rush of the deadline. Bobbi Bernstein, Casey's replacement for the night, claims that Dan slept with her in Spain and failed to call her afterwards, which Dan disputes, calling her "psychotic". In a subsequent episode, "Eli's Coming", Dan learns Bobbi is not wrong, but her appearance was different at the time, and Dan knew her as "Roberta".

Six characters receive top billing in the episode: Casey McCall (Peter Krause); Dan Rydell (Josh Charles); Dana Whitaker (Felicity Huffman); Isaac Jaffe (Robert Guillaume); Natalie Hurley (Sabrina Lloyd) and Jeremy Goodwin (Joshua Malina. Several recurring characters also appear in the episode including Kim (Kayla Blake); Elliot (Greg Baker), Chris (Timothy Davis-Reed), Will (Ron Ostrow) and Gordon (Ted McGinley). Lisa Edelstein, who would later have a starring role in House, guest-stars as Bobbi Bernstein, while other guest stars include Alice Coppola and Amy Powell, who appear as Leesa and Kelly respectively.

The episode received mostly positive reviews. The episode won the Primetime Emmy Award for Outstanding Picture Editing in a multi-camera series at the 51st Primetime Emmy Awards in 1999, and was nominated for the award Outstanding Directorial Achievement for a Comedy Series at the Directors Guild of America Awards 1999. Janet Ashikaga was also recognised by the American Cinema Editors for Best Editing in a Half-Hour Television Series.

== Casting ==
The series uses an ensemble cast, with six of the cast members identified as main characters. Peter Krause and Josh Charles played the two lead anchors on the CSC network, Casey McCall and Dan Rydell respectively. Felicity Huffman played Sports Night producer Dana Whitaker, while Robert Guillaume appeared as her boss Isaac Jaffe, the executive producer. The main cast is rounded off by Sabrina Lloyd, who plays co-producer Natalie Hurley, and Joshua Malina, who plays Jeremy Goodwin auditions to join the crew in the pilot. Other characters given billing include Kayla Blake as Kim, Greg Baker as Elliot, Timothy Davis-Reed as Chris and Ron Ostrow as Will.
