= Pilot (Sports Night) =

- Sports Night episode
- Episode no.: Season 1 Episode 1
- Directed by: Thomas Schlamme
- Written by: Aaron Sorkin
- Production code: 1-01
- Original air date: September 22, 1998

Guest appearances
- Robert Mailhouse as J.J.; Bernard Hocke as Dave; Nina Jane Barry as Claire

Episode chronology
← Previous —	Next → "The Apology"
- Sports Night (season 1)

"Pilot" is the pilot episode of the television series Sports Night, written by Aaron Sorkin and directed by Thomas Schlamme, which premiered on ABC in the United States on September 22, 1998. The pilot introduces viewers to a varied group of personalities working on a fictional late-night American sports show called Sports Night, on the CSC network.

The episode centres on the team's attempts to broadcast a feature about an African athlete who is due to take part in his first race following recovery from a potentially career-ending injury. One of the two lead anchors on the show, Casey, is called up for having an unprofessional attitude on and off screen in the light of his recent divorce from his wife, and is even thinking of leaving the show. Producer Natalie is stuck in a dilemma when she becomes attracted to her colleague Jeremy, who is the new sports statistician at the network.

Six characters receive top billing in the episode: Casey McCall (Peter Krause), Dan Rydell (Josh Charles), Dana Whitaker (Felicity Huffman), Isaac Jaffe (Robert Guillaume), Natalie Hurley (Sabrina Lloyd) and Jeremy Goodwin (Joshua Malina). Several recurring characters also appear in the first episode, including Kim (Kayla Blake), Elliot (Greg Baker), Chris (Timothy Davis-Reed) and Will (Ron Ostrow). Robert Mailhouse guest-stars as J.J., while Bernard Hocke and Nina Jane Barry appear as Dave and Claire respectively.

The episode received largely positive reviews. The episode has received multiple nominations and has won Outstanding Directorial Achievement for a Comedy Series at the 52nd Directors Guild of America Awards and also a Primetime Emmy Award for Outstanding Directing for a Comedy Series.

== Plot ==
The pilot episode introduces the six main characters of the series, as well as the cast of supporting characters. Casey McCall, one of the co-anchors of Sports Night, a sports television roundup show running at 11pm on CSC, the "number 3 sports network" – a channel modeled on ESPN and similar – is displaying a negative attitude, both on and off screen, as a result of his recent divorce. Dan Rydell, his co-anchor, tries to get back his positive attitude, while J.J. and the network executives begin to get vocal about his need to improve or leave the company. Dana Whitaker, his producer, vociferously defends him to the executive producer, Isaac Jaffe, even while she tries to get him to shape up before they override her shielding of him. At the same time, Casey himself is thinking about quitting sports broadcasting, citing the moral decay he's seen on the job, in spite of Dan's observation that he'd only be doing it for the wrong reasons. Dana also hires a new associate producer, the highly strung but brilliant Jeremy Goodwin, who co-producer Natalie Hurley takes a liking to. At the end of the episode, a unique sporting event involving the return of a 41-year-old injured athlete to the running track makes Casey change his mind.

== Production ==
=== Conception ===
Sorkin gathered inspiration for the show from a number of places. According to the Huffington Post, "Sorkin got the idea [for the show] from watching TV...while writing The American President. He was watching ESPN, and found the humor and banter from the anchors (Dan Patrick and...either Keith Olbermann or Craig Kilborn) intoxicating, and decided to create a comedy set in that world". The show utilises a laugh track, which the Post-Gazette described as following "an unwritten primetime rule: all half-hour shows, except animated comedies...must have a laugh track" and Hollywood.com's Peter Hall calls a "goof" that "crippled" the first few episodes" of the show. It is used sparingly in the pilot as "Sports Night has so many dramatic moments".

The show was pitched as not being aimed exclusively at sports fans, with the tagline "It's about sports. The same way Charlie's Angels was about law enforcement." Based on the pre-air pilot, ABC ordered Sports Night for the fall 1998 television season.

=== Casting ===
The pilot episode, as with the rest of the series, uses an ensemble cast, with six of the cast members identified as main characters. Peter Krause and Josh Charles played the two lead anchors on the CSC network, Casey McCall and Dan Rydell respectively. Felicity Huffman played Sports Night producer Dana Whitaker, while Robert Guillaume appeared as her boss, Isaac Jaffe, the executive producer. The main cast is rounded off by Sabrina Lloyd, who plays co-producer Natalie Hurley, and Joshua Malina, who plays Jeremy Goodwin, a new addition to the crew in the pilot. Other characters given billing include Kayla Blake as Kim, Greg Baker as Elliot, Timothy Davis-Reed as Chris and Ron Ostrow as Will.

== Reception ==
=== Ratings ===
It was announced on May 18, 1998, that the show would debut on Tuesdays at 9:30 as part of ABC's comedy block, following Home Improvement, The Hughleys and Spin City. The series debuted on ABC in the opening week of the 1998–99 television season, on September 22, 1998. ABC finished behind CBS in viewing figures for the opening week of programming, while ratings across the networks fell by 4 million compared to the previous year.

=== Critical reception ===
Entertainment Weekly critic Ken Tucker was positive, despite his initial skepticism. He worried that Aaron Sorkin would not be able to translate big-screen success on films such as A Few Good Men and The American President to television, and believed before watching the show that it was "a golden opportunity to stink up prime time with the sort of smug, smirky, life-drainingly ironic talking heads who've outlasted their naughty-boy novelty status on ESPN". However, after watching the show, he wrote "But against all odds, Sports Night is a home run, a hole in one, a touchdown — at once the most consistently funny, intelligent, and emotional of any new-season series."

The Huffington Post's Bob Sassone, while reviewing the show retrospectively in 2006, praised the "intelligent writing, fast-paced dialogue, and a strong ensemble cast of smart, moral characters all working toward a common goal." He also pointed out links betweenSports Night and Aaron Sorkin's next production, the critically acclaimed The West Wing. The Washington Post called Sports Night "the best new ABC sitcom of the season" and also commented "Aaron Sorkin...[has] certainly got a knack for snappy, and occasionally moving, dialogue." They were among a number of publications to point out how the show would appeal to sports fans and non-sports enthusiasts alike. The Associated Press marked Sports Night out as one of the few potential successes amongst the freshman shows for the 1998–99 season. Entertainment Weekly believed that the season as a whole deserved to be nominated for best comedy at the Emmys.

=== Awards and nominations ===
The episode received multiple award nominations. The episode's director Thomas Schlamme won Directors Guild of America award for Directors Guild of America Award for Outstanding Directing – Comedy Series in 1999. The episode also won for Primetime Emmy Award for Outstanding Directing for a Comedy Series at the Emmy Awards in 1999. Bonnie Zane and Paula Rosenberg were nominated for an Artios Award for Best Casting for TV, Comedy Pilot from the Casting Society of America.
