= Directors Guild of America Awards =

Annual film and television awards ceremony

Directors Guild of America Award
- Current: 78th Directors Guild of America Awards
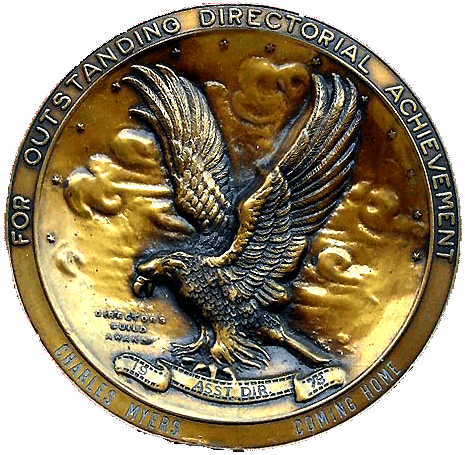
- Logo Medallion of the Directors Guild of America Award
- Awarded for: Film direction
- Country: United States
- First award: 1938
- Website: www.dga.org

The Directors Guild of America Awards are issued annually by the Directors Guild of America. The first DGA Award was an "Honorary Life Member" award issued in 1938 to D. W. Griffith. The statues are made by New York firm, Society Awards.

== Categories ==
=== Competitive categories ===
- Feature Film: since 1948/49
- Documentary: since 1991
- Michael Apted First-Time Feature Film: since 2015 (until 2024: First-Time Feature Film)
- Comedy Series: since 1971
- Commercials: since 1979
- Drama Series: since 1971
- Miniseries or Movies for Television: since 1971
- Reality Programs: since 2005
- Variety/Talk/News/Sports – Regularly Scheduled Programming: since 2013
- Variety/Talk/News/Sports – Specials: since 2013

=== Special awards ===
- Lifetime Achievement in Feature Film: since 1952 (until 1999 as D.W. Griffith Award)
- Lifetime Achievement in Television: since 2014
- Lifetime Achievement in News Direction: since 1995
- Lifetime Achievement in Sports Direction: since 1991
- Honorary Life Member
- Frank Capra Achievement Award: since 1979
- Robert B. Aldrich Service Award: since 1983
- Franklin J. Schaffner Achievement Award: since 1990
- Presidents Award: since 1997
- Diversity Award: since 1996

=== Discontinued categories ===
- Actuality: 1977 to 1980
- Children's Programs: 1996 to 2024
- Daytime Serials: 1991 to 2012
- Documentary / Actuality: 1982 to 1990
- Documentary / News: 1971 to 1981
- Documentary Television: 1977 to 1981
- Drama Show Day: 1983 to 1994
- Golden Jubilee Special Award: 1986
- Musical Variety: 1971 to 2012
- Outstanding Television Director: 1971 to 1975
- Preston Sturges Award: 1990, 1991, 1993
- Specials / Movies for TV / Actuality: 1976 to 1981
- Sports: 1984 to 1990
- Television: 1953 to 1970

== Winners – Motion Picture ==
=== Lifetime Achievement Award ===
(formerly the D. W. Griffith Lifetime Achievement Award)

- 1953: Cecil B. DeMille
- 1954: John Ford
- 1955: No award
- 1956: Henry King
- 1957: King Vidor
- 1958: No award
- 1959: Frank Capra
- 1960: George Stevens
- 1961: Frank Borzage
- 1962–1965: No award
- 1966: William Wyler
- 1967: No award
- 1968: Alfred Hitchcock
- 1969: No award
- 1970: Fred Zinnemann
- 1971–1972: No award
- 1973: William A. Wellman and David Lean
- 1974–1980: No award
- 1981: George Cukor
- 1982: Rouben Mamoulian
- 1983: John Huston
- 1984: Orson Welles
- 1985: Billy Wilder
- 1986: Joseph L. Mankiewicz
- 1987: Elia Kazan
- 1988: Robert Wise
- 1989: No award
- 1990: Ingmar Bergman
- 1991: No award
- 1992: Akira Kurosawa
- 1993: Sidney Lumet
- 1994: Robert Altman
- 1995: James Ivory
- 1996: Woody Allen
- 1997: Stanley Kubrick
- 1998: Francis Ford Coppola
- 1999: No award
- 2000: Steven Spielberg
- 2001: No award
- 2002: Martin Scorsese
- 2003: No award
- 2004: Mike Nichols
- 2005: No award
- 2006: Clint Eastwood
- 2007–2009: No award
- 2010: Norman Jewison
- 2011: Alice Guy-Blaché
- 2012: Miloš Forman
- 2013–2015: No award
- 2016: Ridley Scott
- 2017–2020: No award
- 2021: Spike Lee
- 2022–2023: No award
- 2024: Ang Lee

=== Outstanding Achievement in Feature Film ===
- 1948: Joseph L. Mankiewicz – A Letter to Three Wives ¿
- 1949: Robert Rossen – All the King's Men ¿ **
- 1950: Joseph L. Mankiewicz – All About Eve † **
- 1951: George Stevens – A Place in the Sun †
- 1952: John Ford – The Quiet Man †
- 1953: Fred Zinnemann – From Here to Eternity † **
- 1954: Elia Kazan – On the Waterfront † **
- 1955: Delbert Mann – Marty † **
- 1956: George Stevens – Giant †
- 1957: David Lean – The Bridge on the River Kwai † **
- 1958: Vincente Minnelli – Gigi † **
- 1959: William Wyler – Ben-Hur † **
- 1960: Billy Wilder – The Apartment † **
- 1961: Robert Wise – West Side Story † **
- 1962: David Lean – Lawrence of Arabia † **
- 1963: Tony Richardson – Tom Jones † **
- 1964: George Cukor – My Fair Lady † **
- 1965: Robert Wise – The Sound of Music † **
- 1966: Fred Zinnemann – A Man for All Seasons † **
- 1967: Mike Nichols – The Graduate †
- 1968: Anthony Harvey – The Lion in Winter ‡
- 1969: John Schlesinger – Midnight Cowboy † **
- 1970: Franklin Schaffner – Patton † **
- 1971: William Friedkin – The French Connection † **
- 1972: Francis Ford Coppola – The Godfather ‡ **
- 1973: George Roy Hill – The Sting † **
- 1974: Francis Ford Coppola – The Godfather Part II † **
- 1975: Miloš Forman – One Flew Over the Cuckoo's Nest † **
- 1976: John G. Avildsen – Rocky † **
- 1977: Woody Allen – Annie Hall † **
- 1978: Michael Cimino – The Deer Hunter † **
- 1979: Robert Benton – Kramer vs. Kramer † **
- 1980: Robert Redford – Ordinary People † **
- 1981: Warren Beatty – Reds †
- 1982: Richard Attenborough – Gandhi † **
- 1983: James L. Brooks – Terms of Endearment † **
- 1984: Miloš Forman – Amadeus † **
- 1985: Steven Spielberg – The Color Purple §
- 1986: Oliver Stone – Platoon † **
- 1987: Bernardo Bertolucci – The Last Emperor † **
- 1988: Barry Levinson – Rain Man † **
- 1989: Oliver Stone – Born on the Fourth of July †
- 1990: Kevin Costner – Dances with Wolves † **
- 1991: Jonathan Demme – The Silence of the Lambs † **
- 1992: Clint Eastwood – Unforgiven † **
- 1993: Steven Spielberg – Schindler's List † **
- 1994: Robert Zemeckis – Forrest Gump † **
- 1995: Ron Howard – Apollo 13 §
- 1996: Anthony Minghella – The English Patient † **
- 1997: James Cameron – Titanic † **
- 1998: Steven Spielberg – Saving Private Ryan †
- 1999: Sam Mendes – American Beauty † **
- 2000: Ang Lee – Crouching Tiger, Hidden Dragon ‡
- 2001: Ron Howard – A Beautiful Mind † **
- 2002: Rob Marshall – Chicago ‡ **
- 2003: Peter Jackson – The Lord of the Rings: The Return of the King † **
- 2004: Clint Eastwood – Million Dollar Baby † **
- 2005: Ang Lee – Brokeback Mountain †
- 2006: Martin Scorsese – The Departed † **
- 2007: Joel and Ethan Coen – No Country for Old Men † **
- 2008: Danny Boyle – Slumdog Millionaire † **
- 2009: Kathryn Bigelow – The Hurt Locker † **
- 2010: Tom Hooper – The King's Speech † **
- 2011: Michel Hazanavicius – The Artist † **
- 2012: Ben Affleck – Argo § **
- 2013: Alfonso Cuarón – Gravity †
- 2014: Alejandro G. Iñárritu – Birdman or (The Unexpected Virtue of Ignorance) † **
- 2015: Alejandro G. Iñárritu – The Revenant †
- 2016: Damien Chazelle – La La Land †
- 2017: Guillermo del Toro – The Shape of Water † **
- 2018: Alfonso Cuarón — Roma †
- 2019: Sam Mendes — 1917 ‡
- 2020: Chloe Zhao — Nomadland † **
- 2021: Jane Campion — The Power of the Dog †
- 2022: The Daniels — Everything Everywhere All at Once † **
- 2023: Christopher Nolan — Oppenheimer † **
- 2024: Sean Baker - Anora † **
- 2025: Paul Thomas Anderson – One Battle After Another † **
1. † – Director won the Academy Award.
2. ‡ – Director did not win the Academy Award.
3. § – Director was not nominated for Academy Award that year.
4. ** – Film also won the Academy Award for Best Picture.
5. ¿ – Originally, the DGA used a non-calendar year for its award. Both films competed in the 22nd Academy Awards for 1949, and both directors were nominated for Best Director; Mankiewicz won. All the King's Men won Best Picture; Rossen's DGA was not awarded until after the Oscars. (Beginning with the 1951 award in 1952, the DGA has been always awarded before the Oscars.)

=== Outstanding Achievement in Documentary ===
- 1991: Barbara Kopple – American Dream
- 1992: Joe Berlinger and Bruce Sinofsky – Brother's Keeper
- 1993: Barbara Kopple – Fallen Champ: The Untold Story of Mike Tyson
- 1994: Steve James – Hoop Dreams
- 1995: Terry Zwigoff – Crumb
- 1996: Al Pacino – Looking for Richard
- 1997: Michael Uys and Lexy Lovell – Riding the Rails
- 1998: Jerry Blumenthal, Peter Gilbert, and Gordon Quinn – Vietnam, Long Time Coming
- 1999: Nanette Burstein and Brett Morgen – On the Ropes
- 2000: Chuck Braverman – High School Boot Camp
- 2001: Chris Hegedus and Jehane Noujaim – Startup.com
- 2002: Tasha Oldham – The Smith Family
- 2003: Nathaniel Kahn – My Architect
- 2004: Byambasuren Davaa and Luigi Falorni – The Story of the Weeping Camel
- 2005: Werner Herzog – Grizzly Man
- 2006: Arūnas Matelis – Before Flying Back to Earth
- 2007: Asger Leth – Ghosts of Cité Soleil
- 2008: Ari Folman – Waltz with Bashir
- 2009: Louie Psihoyos – The Cove
- 2010: Charles Ferguson – Inside Job
- 2011: James Marsh – Project Nim
- 2012: Malik Bendjelloul – Searching for Sugar Man
- 2013: Jehane Noujaim – The Square
- 2014: Laura Poitras – Citizenfour
- 2015: Matthew Heineman – Cartel Land
- 2016: Ezra Edelman – O.J.: Made in America
- 2017: Matthew Heineman – City of Ghosts
- 2018: Tim Wardle – Three Identical Strangers
- 2019: Steven Bognar and Julia Reichert — American Factory
- 2020: Michael Dweck & Gregory Kershaw — The Truffle Hunters
- 2021: Stanley Nelson Jr. — Attica
- 2022: Sara Dosa – Fire of Love
- 2023: Mstyslav Chernov – 20 Days in Mariupol
- 2024: Brendan Bellomo and Slava Leontyev – Porcelain War

=== Outstanding Achievement in First-Time Feature Film ===
- 2015: Alex Garland – Ex Machina
- 2016: Garth Davis – Lion
- 2017: Jordan Peele – Get Out
- 2018: Bo Burnham – Eighth Grade
- 2019: Alma Har'el — Honey Boy
- 2020: Darius Marder — Sound of Metal
- 2021: Maggie Gyllenhaal – The Lost Daughter
- 2022: Charlotte Wells – Aftersun
- 2023: Celine Song – Past Lives
- 2024: RaMell Ross – Nickel Boys
- 2025: Charlie Polinger - The Plague

== Winners – Television ==
=== Lifetime Achievement Award ===
- 2014: James Burrows and Robert Butler
- 2015: Joe Pytka
- 2018: Don Mischer
- 2022: Robert A. Fishman
- 2023: David Nutter

=== Outstanding Directorial Achievement in Commercials ===
- 2012: Alejandro González Iñárritu (Procter & Gamble, "Best Job")

=== Outstanding Directorial Achievement in Comedy Series ===
- 1990: James Burrows – Cheers ("Woody Interruptus")
- 1991: Peter Bonerz – Murphy Brown ("Uh-Oh: Part 2")
- 1992: Tom Cherones – Seinfeld ("The Contest")
- 1993: James Burrows – Frasier ("The Good Son")
- 1994: David Lee – Frasier ("The Matchmaker")
- 1995: Gordon Hunt – Mad About You ("The Alan Brady Show")
- 1996: Andy Ackerman – Seinfeld ("The Rye")
- 1997: Andy Ackerman – Seinfeld ("The Betrayal")
- 1998: Thomas Schlamme – Sports Night ("Pilot")
- 1999: Thomas Schlamme – Sports Night ("Small Town")
- 2000: James Burrows – Will & Grace ("Lows in the Mid-Eighties")
- 2001: Todd Holland – Malcolm in the Middle ("Bowling")
- 2002: Bryan Gordon – Curb Your Enthusiasm ("The Special Section")
- 2003: Tim Van Patten – Sex and the City ("Boy, Interrupted")
- 2004: Tim Van Patten – Sex and the City ("An American Girl in Paris: Part Deux")
- 2005: Marc Buckland – My Name Is Earl ("Pilot")
- 2006: Richard Shepard – Ugly Betty ("Pilot")
- 2007: Barry Sonnenfeld – Pushing Daisies ("Pie-lette")
- 2008: Paul Feig – The Office ("Dinner Party")
- 2009: Jason Winer – Modern Family ("Pilot")
- 2010: Michael Spiller – Modern Family ("Halloween")
- 2011: Robert B. Weide – Curb Your Enthusiasm ("Palestinian Chicken")
- 2012: Lena Dunham – Girls ("Pilot")
- 2013: Beth McCarthy-Miller – 30 Rock ("Hogcock!" / "Last Lunch")
- 2014: Joey Soloway (as Jill Soloway) – Transparent ("Best New Girl")
- 2015: Chris Addison – Veep ("Election Night")
- 2016: Becky Martin – Veep ("Inauguration")
- 2017: Beth McCarthy-Miller – Veep ("Chicklet")
- 2018: Bill Hader – Barry ("Chapter One: Make Your Mark")
- 2019: Bill Hader – Barry ("ronny/lily")
- 2020: Susanna Fogel – The Flight Attendant ("In Case of Emergency")
- 2021: Lucia Aniello – Hacks ("There Is No Line")

=== Outstanding Directorial Achievement in Dramatic Series ===
- 1971: Daniel Petrie – The Man and the City ("Hands of Love")
- 1972: Robert Butler – The Waltons ("Dust Bowl Cousins")
- 1973: Charles S. Dubin – Kojak ("Knockover")
- 1974: David Friedkin – Kojak ("Cross Your Heart, Hope to Die")
- 1975: James Cellan Jones – Jennie: Lady Randolph Churchill
- 1976: Glenn Jordan – Family ("Rites of Friendship")
- 1977: John Erman – Roots ("Part II")
- 1978: Gene Reynolds – Lou Grant ("Prisoner")
- 1979: Roger Young – Lou Grant ("Cop")
- 1980: Roger Young – Lou Grant ("Lou")
- 1981: Robert Butler – Hill Street Blues ("Hill Street Station")
- 1982: David Anspaugh – Hill Street Blues ("Personal Foul")
- 1983: Jeff Bleckner – Hill Street Blues ("Life in the Minors")
- 1984: Thomas Carter – Hill Street Blues ("The Rise and Fall of Paul the Wall")
- 1985: Will Mackenzie – Moonlighting ("My Fair David")
- 1986: Will Mackenzie – Moonlighting ("Atomic Shakespeare")
- 1987: Marshall Herskovitz – thirtysomething ("Pilot")
- 1988: Marshall Herskovitz – thirtysomething ("Therapy")
- 1989: Eric Laneuville – L.A. Law ("I'm in the Nude for Love")
- 1990: Michael Zinberg – Quantum Leap ("The Leap Home" – Part II)
- 1991: Eric Laneuville – I'll Fly Away ("All God's Children")
- 1992: Rob Thompson – Northern Exposure ("Cicely")
- 1993: Gregory Hoblit – NYPD Blue ("Pilot")
- 1994: Charles Haid – ER ("Into That Good Night")
- 1995: Christopher Chulack – ER ("Hell and High Water")
- 1996: Christopher Chulack – ER ("Fear of Flying")
- 1997: Barbara Kopple – Homicide: Life on the Street ("The Documentary")
- 1998: Paris Barclay – NYPD Blue ("Hearts and Souls")
- 1999: David Chase – The Sopranos ("The Sopranos")
- 2000: Thomas Schlamme – The West Wing ("Noël")
- 2001: Alan Ball – Six Feet Under ("Pilot")
- 2002: John Patterson – The Sopranos ("Whitecaps")
- 2003: Christopher Misiano – The West Wing ("Twenty Five")
- 2004: Walter Hill – Deadwood ("Deadwood")
- 2005: Michael Apted – Rome ("The Stolen Eagle")
- 2006: Jon Cassar – 24 ("Day 5: 7:00 a.m. – 8:00 a.m.")
- 2007: Alan Taylor – Mad Men ("Smoke Gets in Your Eyes")
- 2008: Dan Attias – The Wire ("Transitions")
- 2009: Lesli Linka Glatter – Mad Men ("Guy Walks Into an Advertising Agency")
- 2010: Martin Scorsese – Boardwalk Empire ("Boardwalk Empire")
- 2011: Patty Jenkins – The Killing ("Pilot")
- 2012: Rian Johnson – Breaking Bad ("Fifty-One")
- 2013: Vince Gilligan – Breaking Bad ("Felina")
- 2014: Lesli Linka Glatter – Homeland ("From A to B and Back Again")
- 2015: David Nutter – Game of Thrones ("Mother's Mercy")
- 2016: Miguel Sapochnik – Game of Thrones ("Battle of the Bastards")
- 2017: Reed Morano – The Handmaid's Tale ("Offred")
- 2018: Adam McKay – Succession ("Celebration")
- 2019: Nicole Kassell – Watchmen ("It's Summer and We're Running Out of Ice")
- 2020: Lesli Linka Glatter – Homeland ("Prisoners of War")
- 2021: Mark Mylod – Succession ("All the Bells Say")

=== Outstanding Directorial Achievement in Children's Programs ===
- 1984: Sharron Miller – The Woman Who Willed a Miracle
- 1996: Stuart Margolin – Salt Water Moose
- 1997: Brian Robbins – Nickelodeon Sports Theater ("First Time")
- 1998: Mitchell Kriegman – Bear in the Big Blue House ("Love Is All You Need")
- 1999: Amy Schatz – Goodnight Moon and Other Sleepy Time Tales
- 2000: Greg Beeman – Miracle in Lane 2
- 2001: Amy Schatz – 'Twas the Night: A Holiday Celebration
- 2002: Guy Ferland – Bang Bang You're Dead
- 2003: Kevin Lima – Eloise at Christmastime
- 2004: Stuart Gillard – Going to the Mat
- 2005: Chris Eyre – Edge of America
- 2006: Kenny Ortega – High School Musical
- 2007: Paul Hoen – Jump In!
- 2008: Amy Schatz – Classical Baby ("The Poetry Show")
- 2009: Allison Liddi-Brown – Princess Protection Program
- 2010: Eric Bross – The Boy Who Cried Werewolf
- 2011: Amy Schatz – A Child's Garden of Poetry
- 2012: Paul Hoen – Let It Shine
- 2013: Amy Schatz – An Apology to Elephants
- 2014: Jonathan Judge – 100 Things To Do Before High School ("Pilot")
- 2015: Kenny Ortega – Descendants
- 2016: Tina Mabry – An American Girl Story – Melody 1963: Love Has to Win
- 2017: Niki Caro – Anne with an E ("Your Will Shall Decide Your Destiny")

=== Outstanding Directorial Achievement in Daytime Serials (1991–2012) ===
- 1991: Michael Stich – The Bold and the Beautiful ("Episode #1103")
- 1992: Susan Strickler – Another World ("Episode 7022")
- 1993: Jill Mitwell – One Life to Live ("Episode 6356")
- 1994: Michael Stich – The Bold and the Beautiful ("Episode 1884")
- 1995: William Ludel and Alan Pultz – General Hospital ("Episode 8248")
- 1996: Kathyrn Foster and Mike Denney – The Young and the Restless ("Episode 5875")
- 1997: Scott McKinsey – General Hospital ("Episode #8883")
- 1998: James Sayegh – One Life to Live ("Episode #7572")
- 1999: Herb D. Stein and Roger W. Inman – Days of Our Lives ("Episode #8557")
- 2000: Jill Mitwell – One Life to Live ("Episode #8205")
- 2001: William Ludel – General Hospital ("Episode #9801")
- 2002: Scott McKinsey – Port Charles ("Episode #1433")
- 2003: Larry Carpenter – One Life to Live ("Episode #8849")
- 2004: Bruce S. Barry – Guiding Light ("Episode #14,321")
- 2005: Owen Renfroe – General Hospital ("Episode #10914")
- 2006: Jill Mitwell – One Life to Live ("Episode #9779")
- 2007: Larry Carpenter – One Life to Live ("Episode #9947")
- 2008: Larry Carpenter – One Life to Live ("Episode #10281")
- 2009: Christopher Goutman – As the World Turns ("Once Upon a Time")
- 2010: Larry Carpenter – One Life to Live ("Starr X'd Lovers: The Musical – Part II")
- 2011: William Ludel – General Hospital ("Intervention")
- 2012: Jill Mitwell – One Life to Live ("Between Heaven and Hell")

=== Outstanding Directorial Achievement in Reality Programs (2005–present) ===
- 2005: Tony Croll – Three Wishes ("Pilot") & J. Rupert Thompson – Fear Factor ("Heist Fear Factor") (TIE)
- 2006: Tony Sacco – Treasure Hunters ("Episode #101")
- 2007: Bertram van Munster – The Amazing Race ("Episode #1110")
- 2008: Tony Croll – America's Next Top Model ("Episode 1002")
- 2009: Craig Borders – Extreme Engineering ("Hong Kong Bridge")
- 2010: Eytan Keller – The Next Iron Chef ("Episode #301")
- 2011: Neil P. DeGroot – The Biggest Loser ("Episode #1115")
- 2012: Brian Smith – MasterChef ("Episode #305")
- 2013: Neil P. DeGroot – 72 Hours ("The Lost Coast")
- 2014: Anthony B. Sacco – The Chair ("The Test")
- 2015: Adam Vetri – Steve Austin's Broken Skull Challenge ("Gods of War")
- 2016: J. Rupert Thompson – American Grit ("Over the Falls")
- 2017: Brian Smith – MasterChef ("Vegas Deluxe & Oyster Schucks")

=== Outstanding Directorial Achievement in Movies for Television and Limited Series as of 2016 ===
- 2000: Jeff Bleckner – The Beach Boys: An American Family
- 2001: Frank Pierson – Conspiracy
- 2002: Mick Jackson – Live from Baghdad
- 2003: Mike Nichols – Angels in America
- 2004: Joseph Sargent – Something the Lord Made
- 2005: George C. Wolfe – Lackawanna Blues
- 2006: Walter Hill – Broken Trail
- 2007: Yves Simoneau – Bury My Heart at Wounded Knee
- 2008: Jay Roach – Recount
- 2009: Ross Katz – Taking Chance
- 2010: Mick Jackson – Temple Grandin
- 2011: Jon Cassar – The Kennedys
- 2012: Jay Roach – Game Change
- 2013: Steven Soderbergh – Behind the Candelabra
- 2014: Lisa Cholodenko – Olive Kitteridge
- 2015: Dee Rees – Bessie
- 2016: Steve Zaillian – The Night Of ("The Beach")
- 2017: Jean-Marc Vallée – Big Little Lies
- 2018: Ben Stiller – Escape at Dannemora
- 2019: Johan Renck – Chernobyl
- 2020: Scott Frank – The Queen's Gambit
- 2021: Barry Jenkins – The Underground Railroad
- 2022: Helen Shaver – Station Eleven, "Who's There?"
- 2023: Sarah Adina Smith – Lessons in Chemistry
- 2024: Steven Zaillian – Ripley

=== Outstanding Directorial Achievement in a Variety/Talk/News/Sports Series (2013–present) ===
Note: This award is for regular programming.

- 2013: Don Roy King – Saturday Night Live ("Justin Timberlake")
- 2014: Dave Diomedi – The Tonight Show Starring Jimmy Fallon ("Episode #1")
- 2015: Dave Diomedi – The Tonight Show Starring Jimmy Fallon ("Episode #325")
- 2016: Don Roy King – Saturday Night Live ("Dave Chappelle")
- 2017: Don Roy King – Saturday Night Live ("Jimmy Fallon")
- 2018: Don Roy King – Saturday Night Live ("Adam Driver")
- 2019: Don Roy King – Saturday Night Live ("Eddie Murphy")
- 2020: Don Roy King – Saturday Night Live ("Dave Chappelle")
- 2021: Don Roy King – Saturday Night Live ("Keegan Michael-Key")
- 2022: Liz Patrick – Saturday Night Live ("Jack Harlow")
- 2023: Michael Mancini & Liz Patrick – Saturday Night Live ("Pedro Pascal")
- 2024: Liz Patrick – Saturday Night Live ("John Mulaney")

=== Outstanding Directorial Achievement in a Variety/Talk/News/Sports Special (2013–present) ===
Note: This award is for special programs.

- 2013: Glenn Weiss – 67th Tony Awards
- 2014: Glenn Weiss – The 68th Tony Awards
- 2015: Don Roy King – Saturday Night Live 40th Anniversary Special
- 2016: Glenn Weiss – 70th Tony Awards
- 2017: Glenn Weiss – 89th Academy Awards
- 2018: Louis J. Horvitz – 60th Grammy Awards
- 2019: James Burrows – All in the Family, and The Jeffersons, Andy Fisher – Live in Front of a Studio Audience: Norman Lear's 'All in the Family' and 'The Jeffersons'
- 2020: Thomas Schlamme – A West Wing Special to Benefit When We All Vote
- 2021: Paul Dugdale – Adele: One Night Only
- 2022: Glenn Weiss – 75th Annual Tony Awards
- 2023: Paul Miller – Carol Burnett: 90 Years of Laughter + Love
- 2024: Beth McCarthy-Miller – The Greatest Roast of All Time: Tom Brady

== See also ==
- Directors Finder Series
