= Primetime Emmy Award for Outstanding Directing for a Comedy Series =

Award for comedy series directing

- Awarded for: Outstanding Directing for a Comedy Series
- Country: United States
- Presented by: Academy of Television Arts & Sciences
- First award: 1959
- Currently held by: Hiro Murai, Widow's Bay (2026)
- Website: emmys.com

The Primetime Emmy Award for Outstanding Directing for a Comedy Series is presented to the best directing of a television comedy series.

== Winners and nominations ==
=== 1950s ===
Year	Program	Episode	Nominee(s)	Network
Best Direction
1955	Studio One	"Twelve Angry Men"	Franklin Schaffner	CBS
1955	Four Star Playhouse	"The Answer"	Roy Kellino	CBS
1955	The Loretta Young Show	"The Clara Schumann Story"	Robert Florey	NBC
1955	The United States Steel Hour	"The Interview"	Alex Segal	ABC
1955	Waterfront	"Christmas in San Pedro"	Ted Post	Syndicated
1955	Your Hit Parade		Clark Jones	NBC
Best Director - Film Series
1956	The Phil Silvers Show		Nat Hiken	CBS
1956	Alfred Hitchcock Presents	"The Case of Mr. Pelham"	Alfred Hitchcock	CBS
1956	The Bob Cummings Show	"Return of the Wolf"	Rod Amateau	CBS
1956	Dragnet		Jack Webb	NBC
1956	Make Room for Daddy		Sheldon Leonard	ABC
1956	You Are There	"Grant & Lee at Appomattox"	Bernard Girard	CBS
1957	Best Direction - Half-Hour or Less			
1957	The Danny Thomas Show	"Danny's Comeback"	Sheldon Leonard	ABC
1957	Camera Three	"As I Lay Dying"	Clay Yurdin	CBS
1957	General Electric Theater	"The Road That Led Afar"	Herschel Daugherty	CBS
1957	Tales of the 77th Bengal Lancers	"The Traitor"	George Archainbaud	NBC
1957	You Are There	"First Moscow Purge Trial"	William D. Russell	CBS
1957	Best Direction - One Hour or More			
1957	Playhouse 90	"Requiem for a Heavyweight"	Ralph Nelson	CBS
1957	The Dinah Shore Chevy Show	"October 5, 1956"	Bob Banner	NBC
1957	Kraft Television Theatre	"A Night to Remember"	George Roy Hill	NBC
1957	NBC Opera Theatre	"La Boheme"	Kirk Browning	NBC
1957	Playhouse 90	"Forbidden Area"	John Frankenheimer	CBS
1957	The 20th Century Fox Hour	"Child of the Regiment"	Lewis Allen	CBS
1958	Best Direction - Half-Hour or Less			
1958	Alfred Hitchcock Presents	"The Glass Eye"	Robert Stevens	CBS
1958	The Danny Thomas Show		Sheldon Leonard	ABC & CBS
1958	Father Knows Best		Peter Tewksbury	NBC
1958	The Patrice Munsel Show		Clark Jones	ABC
1958	Your Hit Parade		Bill Hobin	NBC
1958	Best Direction - One Hour or More			
1958	The Dinah Shore Chevy Show		Bob Banner	NBC
1958	Hallmark Hall of Fame	"The Green Pastures"	George Schaefer	NBC
1958	Playhouse 90	"The Comedian"	John Frankenheimer	CBS
1958	Playhouse 90	"The Helen Morgan Story"	George Roy Hill	CBS
1958	Playhouse 90	"The Miracle Worker"	Arthur Penn	CBS
Best Direction of a Single Program of a Comedy Series
1959	Father Knows Best	"Medal for Margaret"	Peter Tewksbury	CBS
1959	The Danny Thomas Show	"Pardon My Accent"	Sheldon Leonard	CBS
1959	The Jack Benny Program	"Gary Cooper"	Seymour Berns	CBS
1959	Mr. Adams and Eve	"The Interview"	Richard Kinon	CBS
1959	The Real McCoys	"Kate's Career"	Hy Averback	ABC

=== 1960s ===
Year	Program	Episode	Nominee(s)	Network
Outstanding Directorial Achievement in Comedy
1960	The Jack Benny Program		Ralph Levy and Bud Yorkin	CBS
1960	The Danny Thomas Show		Sheldon Leonard	CBS
1960	The Red Skelton Show		Seymour Berns	CBS
1961	The Danny Thomas Show		Sheldon Leonard	CBS
1961	The Bob Hope Buick Show		Dick McDonough and Jack Shea	NBC
1961	My Three Sons		Peter Tewksbury	ABC
1962	Car 54, Where Are You?		Nat Hiken	NBC
1962	The Dick Van Dyke Show		John Rich	CBS
1962	The Garry Moore Show		Dave Geisel	CBS
1962	Henry Fonda and the Family		Bud Yorkin	CBS
1962	The Red Skelton Show		Seymour Berns	CBS
1963	The Dick Van Dyke Show		John Rich	CBS
1963	The Beverly Hillbillies		Richard Whorf	CBS
1963	The Garry Moore Show		Dave Geisel	CBS
1963	The Jack Benny Program		Frederick De Cordova	CBS
1963	The Red Skelton Show		Seymour Berns	CBS
1964	The Dick Van Dyke Show		Jerry Paris	CBS
1964	The Beverly Hillbillies		Richard Whorf	CBS
1964	The Farmer's Daughter		Paul Nickell, William D. Russell and Don Taylor	ABC
1964	McHale's Navy		Sidney Lanfield	ABC
Outstanding Individual Achievements in Entertainment - Directors
1965	The Defenders	"The 700 Year Old Gang"	Paul Bogart	CBS
1965	Hallmark Hall of Fame	"The Magnificent Yankee"	George Schaefer	NBC
1965	My Name Is Barbra		Dwight Hemion	CBS
Outstanding Directorial Achievement in Comedy
1966	Bewitched		William Asher	ABC
1966	The Dick Van Dyke Show		Jerry Paris	CBS
1966	Get Smart	"Diplomat's Daughter"	Paul Bogart	NBC
1967	The Monkees	"Royal Flush"	James Frawley	NBC
1967	Bewitched		William Asher	ABC
1967	Family Affair		William D. Russell	CBS
1967	I Spy	"One of Our Bombs Is Missing"	Earl Bellamy	NBC
1967	The Lucy Show		Maury Thompson	CBS
1968	Get Smart	"Maxwell Smart, Private Eye"	Bruce Bilson	NBC
1968	That Girl		Danny Arnold	ABC
1968	The Monkees	"The Devil and Peter Tork"	James Frawley	NBC
Outstanding Directorial Achievement in Comedy, Variety or Music
1969 (Note: In 1969 and 1970, the nominees for the comedy directing award were variety programs.)	The Dean Martin Show	"October 17, 1968"	Greg Garrison	NBC
1969	The Bill Cosby Special		Bill Hobin	NBC
1969	Rowan & Martin's Laugh-In	"February 3, 1969"	Gordon Wiles	NBC

=== 1970s ===
Year	Program	Episode	Nominee(s)	Network
Outstanding Directorial Achievement in Variety, Comedy or Music
1970	Kraft Music Hall	"The Sound of Burt Bacharach"	Dwight Hemion	NBC
1970	The Second Bill Cosby Special		Seymour Berns	NBC
1970	Young People's Concerts	"Berlioz Takes a Trip"	Roger Englander	CBS
Outstanding Directorial Achievement in Comedy
1971	The Mary Tyler Moore Show	"Toulouse-Lautrec Is One of My Favorite Artists"	Jay Sandrich	CBS
1971	All in the Family	"Gloria's Pregnancy"	John Rich	CBS
1971	The Mary Tyler Moore Show	"Support Your Local Mother"	Alan Rafkin	CBS
1972	All in the Family	"Sammy's Visit"	John Rich	CBS
1972	The Mary Tyler Moore Show	"Thoroughly Unmilitant Mary"	Jay Sandrich	CBS
1972	The Mary Tyler Moore Show	"Where There's Smoke, There's Rhoda"	Peter Baldwin	CBS
1973	The Mary Tyler Moore Show	"It's Whether You Win or Lose"	Jay Sandrich	CBS
1973	All in the Family	"The Bunkers and the Swingers"	John Rich and Bob LaHendro	CBS
1973	M*A*S*H	"Pilot"	Gene Reynolds	CBS
Best Directing in Comedy
1974	M*A*S*H	"Carry On, Hawkeye"	Jackie Cooper	CBS
1974	The Mary Tyler Moore Show	"Lou's First Date"	Jay Sandrich	CBS
1974	M*A*S*H	"Deal Me Out"	Gene Reynolds	CBS
Outstanding Directing in a Comedy Series
1975	M*A*S*H	"O.R."	Gene Reynolds	CBS
1975	M*A*S*H	"Alcoholics Unanimous"	Hy Averback	CBS
1975	M*A*S*H	"Bulletin Board"	Alan Alda	CBS
1976	M*A*S*H	"Welcome to Korea"	Gene Reynolds	CBS
1976	M*A*S*H	"The Kids"	Alan Alda	CBS
1976	The Mary Tyler Moore Show	"Chuckles Bites the Dust"	Joan Darling	CBS
1976	Maude	"The Analyst"	Hal Cooper	CBS
1977	M*A*S*H	"Dear Sigmund"	Alan Alda	CBS
1977	All in the Family	"The Draft Dodger"	Paul Bogart	CBS
1977	M*A*S*H	"Lt. Radar O'Reilly"	Alan Rafkin	CBS
1977	M*A*S*H	"The Nurses"	Joan Darling	CBS
1977	The Mary Tyler Moore Show	"The Last Show"	Jay Sandrich	CBS
1978	All in the Family	"Edith's 50th Birthday"	Paul Bogart	CBS
1978	Happy Days	"Richie Almost Dies"	Jerry Paris	ABC
1978	M*A*S*H	"Comrades in Arms"	Alan Alda and Burt Metcalfe	CBS
1978	Maude	"Vivian's Decision"	Hal Cooper	CBS
1978	Soap	"Episode 24"	Jay Sandrich	ABC
Outstanding Directing in a Comedy or Comedy-Variety or Music Series
1979	Barney Miller	"The Harris Incident"	Noam Pitlik	ABC
1979	All in the Family	"California, Here We Are, Part 2"	Paul Bogart	CBS
1979	M*A*S*H	"Dear Sis"	Alan Alda	CBS
1979	M*A*S*H	"Point of View"	Charles S. Dubin	CBS
1979	Soap	"Episode 27"	Jay Sandrich	ABC

=== 1980s ===
Year	Program	Episode	Nominee(s)	Network
1980	Taxi	"Louie and the Nice Girl"	James Burrows	ABC
1980	M*A*S*H	"Bottle Fatigue"	Burt Metcalfe	CBS
1980	M*A*S*H	"Dreams"	Alan Alda	CBS
1980	M*A*S*H	"Period of Adjustment"	Charles S. Dubin	CBS
1980	M*A*S*H	"Stars and Stripes"	Harry Morgan	CBS
1981	Taxi	"Elaine's Strange Triangle"	James Burrows	ABC
1981	Archie Bunker's Place	"Tough Love"	Linda Day	CBS
1981	Barney Miller	"Liquidation"	Noam Pitlik	ABC
1981	Happy Days	"Hello Mrs. Arcola"	Jerry Paris	ABC
1981	M*A*S*H	"The Life You Save"	Alan Alda	CBS
1981	M*A*S*H	"No Laughing Matter"	Burt Metcalfe	CBS
1981	WKRP in Cincinnati	"Venus Flytrap Explains The Atom"	Rod Daniel	CBS
1982	One Day at a Time	"Barbara's Crisis"	Alan Rafkin	CBS
1982	M*A*S*H	"Picture This"	Burt Metcalfe	CBS
1982	M*A*S*H	"Pressure Points"	Charles S. Dubin	CBS
1982	M*A*S*H	"Sons and Bowlers"	Hy Averback	CBS
1982	M*A*S*H	"Where There's a Will, There's a War"	Alan Alda	CBS
1982	Taxi	"Jim the Psychic"	James Burrows	ABC
1983	Cheers	"Showdown, Part 2"	James Burrows	NBC
1983	Buffalo Bill	"Pilot"	Tom Patchett	NBC
1983	Buffalo Bill	"Woody Quits"	Jim Drake	NBC
1983	The Love Boat	"The Dog Show"	Bob Sweeney	ABC
1983	M*A*S*H	"Goodbye, Farewell and Amen"	Alan Alda	CBS
1983	M*A*S*H	"The Joker Is Wild"	Burt Metcalfe	CBS
1984	Kate & Allie	"The Very Loud Family"	Bill Persky	CBS
1984	AfterMASH	"Fall Out"	Larry Gelbart	CBS
1984	Buffalo Bill	"Jo-Jo's Problem, Part 2"	Ellen Falcon	NBC
1984	Cheers	"Old Flames"	James Burrows	NBC
1985	The Cosby Show	"The Younger Woman"	Jay Sandrich	NBC
1985	Alice	"Tommy's Lost Weekend"	Marc Daniels	CBS
1985	Cheers	"Cheerio, Cheers"	James Burrows	NBC
1985	Kate & Allie	"Landlady"	Bill Persky	CBS
1985	Moonlighting	"Pilot"	Robert Butler	ABC
1986	The Cosby Show	"Denise's Friend"	Jay Sandrich	NBC
1986	Cheers	"The Triangle"	James Burrows	NBC
1986	The Golden Girls	"A Little Romance"	Terry Hughes	NBC
1986	The Golden Girls	"The Heart Attack"	Jim Drake	NBC
1986	Kate & Allie	"Chip's Friend"	Bill Persky	CBS
1987	The Golden Girls	"Isn't it Romantic?"	Terry Hughes	NBC
1987	Cheers	"Chambers vs. Malone"	James Burrows	NBC
1987	The Cosby Show	"I Know that You Know"	Jay Sandrich	NBC
1987	Designing Women	"The Beauty Contest"	Jack Shea	CBS
1987	Family Ties	"A, My Name is Alex"	Will Mackenzie	NBC
1988	Hooperman	"Pilot"	Gregory Hoblit	ABC
1988	Cheers	"Backseat Becky, Up Front"	James Burrows	NBC
1988	The Days and Nights of Molly Dodd	"Here Comes that Cold Wind off the River"	Jay Tarses	NBC
1988	It's Garry Shandling's Show	"No Baby, No Show"	Alan Rafkin	Showtime
1988	The Golden Girls	"Old Friends"	Terry Hughes	NBC
1989	The Wonder Years	"Our Miss White"	Peter Baldwin	ABC
1989	Cheers	"The Visiting Leecher"	James Burrows	NBC
1989	The Golden Girls	"Brother, Can You Spare That Jacket?"	Terry Hughes	NBC
1989	Murphy Brown	"Pilot"	Barnet Kellman	CBS
1989	The Wonder Years	"Birthday Boy"	Steve Miner	ABC
1989	The Wonder Years	"How I'm Spending My Summer Vacation"	Michael Dinner	ABC

=== 1990s ===
Year	Program	Episode	Nominee(s)	Network
1990	The Wonder Years	"Good-bye"	Michael Dinner	ABC
1990	Cheers	"The Improbable Dream, Part 1"	James Burrows	NBC
1990	Designing Women	"They Shoot Fat Women, Don't They?"	Harry Thomason	CBS
1990	The Famous Teddy Z	"Pilot"	Hugh Wilson	CBS
1990	The Golden Girls	"Triple Play"	Terry Hughes	NBC
1990	Murphy Brown	"Brown Like Me"	Barnet Kellman	CBS
1991	Cheers	"Woody Interruptus"	James Burrows	NBC
1991	The Days and Nights of Molly Dodd	"Here's a Little Touch of Harry in the Night"	Jay Tarses	Lifetime
1991	Murphy Brown	"On Another Plane"	Barnet Kellman	CBS
1991	Seinfeld	"The Pony Remark"	Tom Cherones	NBC
1991	The Wonder Years	"The Ties That Bind"	Peter Baldwin	ABC
1992	Murphy Brown	"Birth 101"	Barnet Kellman	CBS
1992	Brooklyn Bridge	"When Irish Eyes Are Smiling"	Sam Weisman	CBS
1992	Cheers	"An Old Fashioned Wedding"	James Burrows	NBC
1992	Murphy Brown	"Send in the Clowns"	Lee Shallat-Chemel	CBS
1992	Seinfeld	"The Tape"	David Steinberg	NBC
1993	Dream On	"For Peter's Sake"	Betty Thomas	HBO
1993	Cheers	"One for the Road"	James Burrows	NBC
1993	Dream On	"And Bimbo Was His Name-O"	Eric Laneuville	HBO
1993	Murphy Brown	"You Say Potatoe, I Say Potato"	Peter Bonerz	CBS
1993	Seinfeld	"The Contest"	Tom Cherones	NBC
1994	Frasier	"The Good Son"	James Burrows	NBC
1994	The John Larroquette Show	"Pilot"	John Whitesell	NBC
1994	The Larry Sanders Show	"Life Behind Larry"	Todd Holland	HBO
1994	Mad About You	"Love Letters"	Tom Moore	NBC
1994	Mad About You	"Paul is Dead"	Lee Shallat-Chemel	NBC
1994	Seinfeld	"The Mango"	Tom Cherones	NBC
1995	Frasier	"The Matchmaker"	David Lee	NBC
1995	Friends	"The One with the Blackout"	James Burrows	NBC
1995	The Larry Sanders Show	"Hank's Night in the Sun"	Todd Holland	HBO
1995	The Nanny	"Canasta Master"	Lee Shallat-Chemel	CBS
1995	Seinfeld	"The Jimmy"	Andy Ackerman	NBC
1996	Friends	"The One After the Superbowl"	Michael Lembeck	NBC
1996	The Larry Sanders Show	"Arthur After Hours"	Todd Holland	HBO
1996	The Larry Sanders Show	"I Was a Teenage Lesbian"	Michael Lehmann	HBO
1996	Seinfeld	"The Soup Nazi"	Andy Ackerman	NBC
1996	3rd Rock from the Sun	"Brains and Eggs"	James Burrows	NBC
1997	Frasier	"To Kill a Talking Bird"	David Lee	NBC
1997	Ellen	"The Puppy Episode"	Gil Junger	ABC
1997	The Larry Sanders Show	"Everybody Loves Larry"	Todd Holland	HBO
1997	The Larry Sanders Show	"Ellen, or Isn't She?"	Alan Myerson	HBO
1997	Seinfeld	"The Pothole"	Andy Ackerman	NBC
1998	The Larry Sanders Show	"Flip"	Todd Holland	HBO
1998	Ally McBeal	"Cro-Magnon"	Allan Arkush	Fox
1998	Ally McBeal	"Pilot"	James Frawley	Fox
1998	Dharma & Greg	"Pilot"	James Burrows	ABC
1998	3rd Rock from the Sun	"Dick and the Other Guy"	Terry Hughes	NBC
1999	Sports Night	"Pilot"	Thomas Schlamme	ABC
1999	Ally McBeal	"Those Lips, That Hand"	Arlene Sanford	Fox
1999	Everybody Loves Raymond	"Robert's Date"	Will Mackenzie	CBS
1999	Friends	"The One Where Everybody Finds Out"	Michael Lembeck	NBC
1999	Will & Grace	"Pilot"	James Burrows	NBC

=== 2000s ===
Year	Program	Episode	Nominee(s)	Network
2000	Malcolm in the Middle	"Pilot"	Todd Holland	Fox
2000	Ally McBeal	"Ally McBeal: The Musical, Almost"	Bill D'Elia	Fox
2000	Everybody Loves Raymond	"The Christmas Picture"	Will Mackenzie	CBS
2000	Friends	"The One That Could Have Been"	Michael Lembeck	NBC
2000	Sports Night	"Quo Vadimus"	Thomas Schlamme	ABC
2000	Will & Grace	"Homo for the Holidays"	James Burrows	NBC
2001	Malcolm in the Middle	"Bowling"	Todd Holland	Fox
2001	Ed	"Pilot"	James Frawley	NBC
2001	Malcolm in the Middle	"Flashback"	Jeffrey Melman	Fox
2001	Sex and the City	"Easy Come, Easy Go"	Charles McDougall	HBO
2001	Will & Grace	"Lows in the Mid-Eighties"	James Burrows	NBC
2002	Sex and the City	"The Real Me"	Michael Patrick King	HBO
2002	Curb Your Enthusiasm	"The Doll"	Robert B. Weide	HBO
2002	Malcolm in the Middle	"Christmas"	Jeffrey Melman	Fox
2002	Scrubs	"My Old Lady"	Marc Buckland	NBC
2002	Will & Grace	"A Chorus Lie"	James Burrows	NBC
2003	Curb Your Enthusiasm	"Krazee-Eyez Killa"	Robert B. Weide	HBO
2003	Curb Your Enthusiasm	"Mary, Joseph, and Larry"	David Steinberg	HBO
2003	Curb Your Enthusiasm	"The Nanny from Hell"	Larry Charles	HBO
2003	Curb Your Enthusiasm	"The Special Section"	Bryan Gordon	HBO
2003	Sex and the City	"I Love a Charade"	Michael Engler	HBO
2003	Will & Grace	"24"	James Burrows	NBC
2004	Arrested Development	"Pilot"	Anthony and Joe Russo	Fox
2004	Curb Your Enthusiasm	"The 5 Wood"	Bryan Gordon	HBO
2004	Curb Your Enthusiasm	"The Car Pool Lane"	Robert B. Weide	HBO
2004	Curb Your Enthusiasm	"The Survivor"	Larry Charles	HBO
2004	Sex and the City	"An American Girl in Paris: Part Deux"	Tim Van Patten	HBO
2005	Desperate Housewives	"Pilot"	Charles McDougall	ABC
2005	Entourage	"Pilot"	David Frankel	HBO
2005	Everybody Loves Raymond	"The Finale"	Gary Halvorson	CBS
2005	Monk	"Mr. Monk Takes His Medicine"	Randall Zisk	USA
2005	Will & Grace	"It's a Dad, Dad, Dad, Dad World"	James Burrows	NBC
2006	My Name Is Earl	"Pilot"	Marc Buckland	NBC
2006	The Comeback	"Valerie Does Another Classic Leno"	Michael Patrick King	HBO
2006	Curb Your Enthusiasm	"The Christ Nail"	Robert B. Weide	HBO
2006	Entourage	"Oh, Mandy"	Daniel Attias	HBO
2006	Entourage	"Sundance Kids"	Julian Farino	HBO
2006	Weeds	"Good Shit Lollipop"	Craig Zisk	Showtime
2007	Ugly Betty	"Pilot"	Richard Shepard	ABC
2007	Entourage	"One Day in the Valley"	Julian Farino	HBO
2007	Extras	"Orlando Bloom"	Stephen Merchant & Ricky Gervais	HBO
2007	The Office	"Gay Witch Hunt"	Ken Kwapis	NBC
2007	Scrubs	"My Musical"	Will Mackenzie	NBC
2007	30 Rock	"The Break-Up"	Scott Ellis	NBC
2008	Pushing Daisies	"Pie-lette"	Barry Sonnenfeld	ABC
2008	Entourage	"No Cannes Do"	Daniel Attias	HBO
2008	Flight of the Conchords	"Sally Returns"	James Bobin	HBO
2008	The Office	"Goodbye, Toby"	Paul Feig	NBC
2008	The Office	"Money"	Paul Lieberstein	NBC
2008	30 Rock	"Rosemary's Baby"	Michael Engler	NBC
2009	The Office	"Stress Relief"	Jeffrey Blitz	NBC
2009	Entourage	"Tree Trippers"	Julian Farino	HBO
2009	Flight of the Conchords	"The Tough Brets"	James Bobin	HBO
2009	30 Rock	"Apollo, Apollo"	Millicent Shelton	NBC
2009	30 Rock	"Generalissimo"	Todd Holland	NBC
2009	30 Rock	"Reunion"	Beth McCarthy-Miller	NBC

=== 2010s ===
Year	Program	Episode	Nominee(s)	Network
2010	Glee	"Pilot"	Ryan Murphy	Fox
2010	Glee	"Wheels"	Paris Barclay	Fox
2010	Modern Family	"Pilot"	Jason Winer	ABC
2010	Nurse Jackie	"Pilot"	Allen Coulter	Showtime
2010	30 Rock	"I Do Do"	Don Scardino	NBC
2011	Modern Family	"Halloween"	Michael Spiller	ABC
2011	How I Met Your Mother	"Subway Wars"	Pamela Fryman	CBS
2011	Modern Family	"See You Next Fall"	Steven Levitan	ABC
2011	Modern Family	"Slow Down Your Neighbors"	Gail Mancuso	ABC
2011	30 Rock	"Live Show"	Beth McCarthy-Miller	NBC
2012	Modern Family	"Baby on Board"	Steven Levitan	ABC
2012	Curb Your Enthusiasm	"Palestinian Chicken"	Robert B. Weide	HBO
2012	Girls	"She Did"	Lena Dunham	HBO
2012	Louie	"Duckling"	Louis C.K.	FX
2012	Modern Family	"Virgin Territory"	Jason Winer	ABC
2012	New Girl	"Pilot"	Jake Kasdan	Fox
2013	Modern Family	"Arrested"	Gail Mancuso	ABC
2013	Girls	"On All Fours"	Lena Dunham	HBO
2013	Glee	"Diva"	Paris Barclay	Fox
2013	Louie	"New Year's Eve"	Louis C.K.	FX
2013	30 Rock	"Hogcock!" & "Last Lunch"	Beth McCarthy-Miller	NBC
2014	Modern Family	"Las Vegas"	Gail Mancuso	ABC
2014	Episodes	"Episode 309"	Iain B. MacDonald	Showtime
2014	Glee	"100"	Paris Barclay	Fox
2014	Louie	"Elevator, Part 6"	Louis C.K.	FX
2014	Orange Is the New Black	"Lesbian Request Denied"	Jodie Foster	Netflix
2014	Silicon Valley	"Minimum Viable Product"	Mike Judge	HBO
2015	Transparent	"Best New Girl"	Joey Soloway	Amazon
2015	The Last Man on Earth	"Alive in Tucson"	Phil Lord and Christopher Miller	Fox
2015	Louie	"Sleepover"	Louis C.K.	FX
2015	Silicon Valley	"Sand Hill Shuffle"	Mike Judge	HBO
2015	Veep	"Testimony"	Armando Iannucci	HBO
2016
2016	Transparent	"Man on the Land"	Joey Soloway	Amazon
2016	Master of None	"Parents"	Aziz Ansari	Netflix
2016	Silicon Valley	"Daily Active Users"	Alec Berg	HBO
2016	Silicon Valley	"Founder Friendly"	Mike Judge	HBO
2016	Veep	"Kissing Your Sister"	David Mandel	HBO
2016	Veep	"Morning After"	Chris Addison	HBO
2016	Veep	"Mother"	Dale Stern	HBO
2017
2017	Atlanta	"B.A.N."	Donald Glover	FX
2017	Silicon Valley	"Intellectual Property"	Jamie Babbit	HBO
2017	Silicon Valley	"Server Error"	Mike Judge	HBO
2017	Veep	"Blurb"	Morgan Sackett	HBO
2017	Veep	"Groundbreaking"	David Mandel	HBO
2017	Veep	"Justice"	Dale Stern	HBO
2018
2018	The Marvelous Mrs. Maisel	"Pilot"	Amy Sherman-Palladino	Amazon
2018	Atlanta	"FUBU"	Donald Glover	FX
2018	Atlanta	"Teddy Perkins"	Hiro Murai	FX
2018	Barry	"Chapter One: Make Your Mark"	Bill Hader	HBO
2018	The Big Bang Theory	"The Bow Tie Asymmetry"	Mark Cendrowski	CBS
2018	GLOW	"Pilot"	Jesse Peretz	Netflix
2018	Silicon Valley	"Initial Coin Offering"	Mike Judge	HBO
2019
2019	Fleabag	"Episode 201"	Harry Bradbeer	Amazon
2019	Barry	"The Audition"	Alec Berg	HBO
2019	Barry	"ronny/lily"	Bill Hader	HBO
2019	The Big Bang Theory	"The Stockholm Syndrome"	Mark Cendrowski	CBS
2019	The Marvelous Mrs. Maisel	"All Alone"	Amy Sherman-Palladino	Amazon
2019	The Marvelous Mrs. Maisel	"We're Going to the Catskills!"	Daniel Palladino	Amazon

=== 2020s ===
Year	Program	Episode	Nominee(s)	Network
2020
2020	Schitt's Creek	"Happy Ending"	Andrew Cividino and Dan Levy	Pop TV
2020	The Great	"The Great"	Matt Shakman	Hulu
2020	Ramy	"Miakhalifa.mov"	Ramy Youssef	Hulu
2020	The Marvelous Mrs. Maisel	"It's Comedy or Cabbage"	Amy Sherman-Palladino	Prime Video
2020	The Marvelous Mrs. Maisel	"Marvelous Radio"	Daniel Palladino	Prime Video
2020	Modern Family	"Finale, Part 2"	Gail Mancuso	ABC
2020	Will & Grace	"We Love Lucy"	James Burrows	NBC
2021
2021	Hacks	"There Is No Line"	Lucia Aniello	HBO Max
2021	B Positive	"Pilot"	James Burrows	CBS
2021	Mom	"Scooby-Doo Checks and Salisbury Steak"	James Widdoes	CBS
2021	The Flight Attendant	"In Case of Emergency"	Susanna Fogel	HBO Max
2021	Ted Lasso	"Biscuits"	Zach Braff	Apple TV+
2021	Ted Lasso	"The Hope That Kills You"	MJ Delaney	Apple TV+
2021	Ted Lasso	"Make Rebecca Great Again"	Declan Lowney	Apple TV+
2022
2022	Ted Lasso	"No Weddings and a Funeral"	MJ Delaney	Apple TV+
2022	Atlanta	"New Jazz"	Hiro Murai	FX
2022	Barry	"710N"	Bill Hader	HBO
2022	Hacks	"There Will Be Blood"	Lucia Aniello	HBO Max
2022	The Ms. Pat Show	"Baby Daddy Groundhog Day"	Mary Lou Belli	BET+
2022	Only Murders in the Building	"The Boy from 6B"	Cherien Dabis	Hulu
2022	Only Murders in the Building	"True Crime"	Jamie Babbit	Hulu
2023
2023	The Bear	"Review"	Christopher Storer	FX
2023	Barry	"wow"	Bill Hader	HBO
2023	The Marvelous Mrs. Maisel	"Four Minutes"	Amy Sherman-Palladino	Prime Video
2023	The Ms. Pat Show	"Don't Touch My Hair"	Mary Lou Belli	BET+
2023	Ted Lasso	"So Long, Farewell"	Declan Lowney	Apple TV+
2023	Wednesday	"Wednesday's Child Is Full of Woe"	Tim Burton	Netflix
2024
2024	The Bear	"Fishes"	Christopher Storer	FX
2024	Abbott Elementary	"Party"	Randall Einhorn	ABC
2024	The Bear	"Honeydew"	Ramy Youssef	FX
2024	The Gentlemen	"Refined Aggression"	Guy Ritchie	Netflix
2024	Hacks	"Bulletproof"	Lucia Aniello	Max
2024	The Ms. Pat Show	"I'm the Pappy"	Mary Lou Belli	BET+
2025
2025	The Studio	"The Oner"	Seth Rogen and Evan Goldberg	Apple TV+
2025	The Bear	"Napkins"	Ayo Edebiri	FX
2025	Hacks	"A Slippery Slope"	Lucia Aniello	HBO Max
2025	Mid-Century Modern	"Here's to You, Mrs. Schneiderman"	James Burrows	Hulu
2025	The Rehearsal	"Pilot's Code"	Nathan Fielder	HBO
2026
2026	Widow's Bay	"Welcome to Widow's Bay"	Hiro Murai	Apple TV
2026	Abbott Elementary	"Ballgame"	Randall Einhorn	ABC
2026	The Bear	"Bears"	Christopher Storer	FX
2026	The Chair Company	"Life goes by too f**king fast, it really does."	Andrew DeYoung	HBO
2026	Hacks	"Hacks"	Lucia Aniello	HBO Max
2026	The Ms. Pat Show	"Give It Arrest"	Mary Lou Belli	BET+

== Total awards by network ==
- CBS – 15
- ABC – 14
- NBC – 14
- Amazon – 4
- Fox – 4
- HBO – 4
- FX – 3
- Apple TV+ - 3
- HBO Max — 1
- Pop TV – 1

== Programs with multiple awards ==
4 awards

- M*A*S*H (consecutive)
- Modern Family (consecutive)

3 awards

- Frasier (2 consecutive)

2 awards

- All in the Family
- The Bear (consecutive)
- Cheers
- The Cosby Show (consecutive)
- The Dick Van Dyke Show (consecutive)
- Malcolm in the Middle (consecutive)
- The Mary Tyler Moore Show
- Taxi (consecutive)
- Transparent (consecutive)
- The Wonder Years (consecutive)

== Programs with multiple nominations ==
26 nominations

- M*A*S*H

11 nominations

- Cheers

10 nominations

- Curb Your Enthusiasm

9 nominations

- Modern Family

8 nominations

- The Mary Tyler Moore Show
- 30 Rock

7 nominations

- The Larry Sanders Show
- Seinfeld
- Silicon Valley
- Veep
- Will & Grace

6 nominations

- All in the Family
- Entourage
- The Golden Girls
- The Marvelous Mrs. Maisel
- Murphy Brown

5 nominations

- Barry
- The Bear
- Hacks
- Ted Lasso
- The Wonder Years

4 nominations

- Ally McBeal
- Atlanta
- The Dick Van Dyke Show
- Friends
- Glee
- Louie
- The Ms. Pat Show
- Malcolm in the Middle
- The Office
- Sex and the City

3 nominations

- Buffalo Bill
- The Cosby Show
- The Danny Thomas Show
- Everybody Loves Raymond
- Frasier
- Kate & Allie
- The Red Skelton Show
- Taxi

2 nominations

- Abbott Elementary
- Barney Miller
- The Beverly Hillbillies
- Bewitched
- The Big Bang Theory
- The Days and Nights of Molly Dodd
- Designing Women
- Dream On
- Flight of the Conchords
- The Garry Moore Show
- Get Smart
- Girls
- Happy Days
- The Jack Benny Show
- Mad About You
- Maude
- The Monkees
- Only Murders in the Building
- Scrubs
- Soap
- Sports Night
- 3rd Rock from the Sun
- Transparent

== Individuals with multiple awards ==
5 awards

- James Burrows (2 consecutive)

4 awards

- Jay Sandrich (2 consecutive)

3 awards

- Todd Holland (2 consecutive)

2 awards

- David Lee
- Gail Mancuso (consecutive)
- Gene Reynolds (consecutive)
- John Rich
- Joey Soloway (consecutive)
- Christopher Storer (consecutive)

== Individuals with multiple nominations ==
27 nominations

- James Burrows

10 nominations

- Jay Sandrich

9 nominations

- Alan Alda

8 nominations

- Todd Holland

6 nominations

- Terry Hughes

5 nominations

- Lucia Aniello
- Seymour Berns
- Mike Judge
- Burt Metcalfe
- John Rich
- Robert B. Weide

4 nominations

- Mary Lou Belli
- Paul Bogart
- Louis C.K.
- James Frawley
- Bill Hader
- Barnet Kellman
- Will Mackenzie
- Gail Mancuso
- Jerry Paris
- Gene Reynolds
- Amy Sherman-Palladino

3 nominations

- Andy Ackerman
- Hy Averback
- Peter Baldwin
- Paris Barclay
- Tom Cherones
- Charles S. Dubin
- Julian Farino
- Michael Lembeck
- Sheldon Leonard
- Beth McCarthy-Miller
- Hiro Murai
- Bill Persky
- Lee Shallat-Chemel
- Christopher Storer

2 nominations

- William Asher
- Daniel Attias
- Jamie Babbit
- Alec Berg
- James Bobin
- Marc Buckland
- Mark Cendrowski
- Larry Charles
- Hal Cooper
- Joan Darling
- MJ Delaney
- Michael Dinner
- Jim Drake
- Lena Dunham
- Randall Einhorn
- Michael Engler
- Dave Geisel
- Donald Glover
- Bryan Gordon
- Michael Patrick King
- David Lee
- Steven Levitan
- Declan Lowney
- David Mandel
- Charles McDougall
- Daniel Palladino
- Noam Pitlik
- Jeffrey Melman
- William D. Russell
- Thomas Schlamme
- Jack Shea
- Joey Soloway
- David Steinberg
- Dale Stern
- Jay Tarses
- Peter Tewksbury
- Richard Whorf
- Jason Winer
- Bud Yorkin
- Ramy Youssef

== See also ==
- Primetime Emmy Award for Outstanding Directing for a Drama Series
- Primetime Emmy Award for Outstanding Directing for a Variety Series
