= 51st Primetime Emmy Awards =

1999 American television programming awards

- Date: September 12, 1999 (Ceremony); August 28, 1999 (Creative Arts Awards)
- Location: Shrine Auditorium, Los Angeles, California
- Presented by: Academy of Television Arts and Sciences
- Hosted by: Jenna Elfman; David Hyde Pierce

Highlights
- Most awards: The Practice (3)
- Most nominations: The Sopranos (10)
- Outstanding Comedy Series: Ally McBeal
- Outstanding Drama Series: The Practice
- Outstanding Miniseries: Hornblower
- Outstanding Variety, Music or Comedy Series: Late Show with David Letterman

Television/radio coverage
- Network: Fox
- Produced by: Brad Lachman

The 51st Primetime Emmy Awards were held on Sunday, September 12, 1999. The ceremony show was hosted by Jenna Elfman and David Hyde Pierce. It was broadcast on Fox. 27 awards were presented.

The comedy-drama Ally McBeal won Outstanding Comedy Series, which not only dethroned five-time defending champion Frasier but also became the first time Fox won that award. In the drama field The Practice won Outstanding Drama Series for the second straight year, and led all shows with three major wins on the night.

Freshman series The Sopranos led all shows with 10 major nominations. From that show, Edie Falco not only became the first actress from a Cable network (HBO) to win Lead Actress, Drama series, she became the first person from any Cable TV show series to win a Major Acting award. (Though David Clennon did win for only a guest performance in HBO's Dream On in 1993).

The real winner of the night was television writer David E. Kelley. Kelley was the creator and head writer for both series champions, Ally McBeal and The Practice. This accomplishment has not been matched since.

== Winners and nominees ==
=== Programs ===
Outstanding Comedy Series: Ally McBeal (Fox); Everybody Loves Raymond (CBS); Frasier (NBC); Friends (NBC); Sex and the City (HBO)	Outstanding Drama Series: The Practice (ABC); ER (NBC); Law & Order (NBC); NYPD Blue (ABC); The Sopranos (HBO)
Outstanding Variety, Music or Comedy Series: Late Show with David Letterman (CBS); Dennis Miller Live (HBO); Politically Incorrect with Bill Maher (ABC); The Tonight Show with Jay Leno (NBC); Tracey Takes On... (HBO)	Outstanding Variety, Music or Comedy Special: 1998 Tony Awards (CBS); The 71st Annual Academy Awards (ABC); George Carlin: You Are All Diseased (HBO); Jerry Seinfeld: “I'm Telling You for the Last Time” (HBO); John Leguizamo's Freak (HBO)
Outstanding Made for Television Movie: A Lesson Before Dying (HBO); The Baby Dance (Showtime); Dash and Lilly (A&E); Pirates of Silicon Valley (TNT); The Rat Pack (HBO)	Outstanding Miniseries: Hornblower (A&E); The '60s (NBC); Great Expectations (PBS); Joan of Arc (CBS); The Temptations (NBC)

=== Acting ===
==== Lead performances ====
Outstanding Lead Actor in a Comedy Series: John Lithgow as Dr. Dick Solomon in 3rd Rock from the Sun (NBC) (Episode: "What's Love Got to Do, Got to Do with Dick?"); Michael J. Fox as Mike Flaherty in Spin City (ABC) (Episode: "Gone with the Wind"); Kelsey Grammer as Dr. Frasier Crane in Frasier (NBC) (Episode: "Merry Christmas, Mrs. Moskowitz"); Paul Reiser as Paul Buchman in Mad About You (NBC) (Episode: "The Final Frontier"); Ray Romano as Ray Barone in Everybody Loves Raymond (CBS) (Episode: "How They Met")	Outstanding Lead Actress in a Comedy Series: Helen Hunt as Jamie Buchman in Mad About You (NBC) (Episode: "The Final Frontier"); Jenna Elfman as Dharma Montgomery in Dharma & Greg (ABC) (Episode: "Are You Ready for Some Football?"); Calista Flockhart as Ally McBeal in Ally McBeal (Fox) (Episode: "Sideshow"); Patricia Heaton as Debra Barone in Everybody Loves Raymond (CBS) (Episode: "Be Nice"); Sarah Jessica Parker as Carrie Bradshaw in Sex and the City (HBO) (Episode: "The Drought")
Outstanding Lead Actor in a Drama Series: Dennis Franz as Andy Sipowicz in NYPD Blue (ABC) (Episode: "Safe Home"); James Gandolfini as Tony Soprano in The Sopranos (HBO) (Episode: "The Sopranos"); Dylan McDermott as Bobby Donnell in The Practice (ABC) (Episode: "Happily Ever After"); Jimmy Smits as Bobby Simone in NYPD Blue (ABC) (Episode: "Hearts and Souls"); Sam Waterston as Jack McCoy in Law & Order (NBC) (Episode: "Sideshow")	Outstanding Lead Actress in a Drama Series: Edie Falco as Carmela Soprano in The Sopranos (HBO) (Episode: "College"); Gillian Anderson as Dr. Dana Scully in The X-Files (Fox) (Episode: "Milagro"); Lorraine Bracco as Dr. Jennifer Melfi in The Sopranos (HBO) (Episode: "The Legend of Tennessee Moltisanti"); Christine Lahti as Dr. Kate Austin in Chicago Hope (CBS) (Episode: "Karmic Relief"); Julianna Margulies as Carol Hathaway in ER (NBC) (Episode: "The Storm", Part 2)
Outstanding Lead Actor in a Miniseries or Movie: Stanley Tucci as Walter Winchell in Winchell (HBO); Don Cheadle as Grant Wiggins in A Lesson Before Dying (HBO); Ian Holm as King Lear in King Lear (PBS); Jack Lemmon as Henry Drummond in Inherit the Wind (Showtime); Sam Shepard as Dashiell Hammett in Dash and Lilly (A&E)	Outstanding Lead Actress in a Miniseries or Movie: Helen Mirren as Ayn Rand in The Passion of Ayn Rand (Showtime); Ann-Margret as Pamela Harriman in Life of the Party: The Pamela Harriman Story (Lifetime); Stockard Channing as Rachel Luckman in The Baby Dance (Showtime); Judy Davis as Lillian Hellman in Dash and Lilly (A&E); Leelee Sobieski as Joan of Arc in Joan of Arc (CBS)
Outstanding Performance in a Variety or Music Program: John Leguizamo in John Leguizamo's Freak (HBO); George Carlin in George Carlin: You Are All Diseased (HBO); Dennis Miller in Dennis Miller Live (HBO); Chris Rock in The Chris Rock Show (HBO); Tracey Ullman in Tracey Takes On... (HBO)

==== Supporting performances ====
Outstanding Supporting Actor in a Comedy Series: David Hyde Pierce as Dr. Niles Crane in Frasier (NBC) (Episodes: "Merry Christmas, Mrs. Moskowitz" + "Three Valentines"); Peter Boyle as Frank Barone in Everybody Loves Raymond (CBS) (Episodes: "Driving Frank" + "Ping Pong"); Peter MacNicol as John Cage in Ally McBeal (Fox); John Mahoney as Martin Crane in Frasier (NBC) (Episodes: "Merry Christmas, Mrs. Moskowitz" + "Our Parents, Ourselves"); David Spade as Dennis Finch in Just Shoot Me! (NBC) (Episodes: "Two Girls for Every Boy" + "Slow Donnie")	Outstanding Supporting Actress in a Comedy Series: Kristen Johnston as Sally Solomon in 3rd Rock from the Sun (NBC) (Episodes: "Two-Faced Dick" + "Dick the Mouth Solomon"); Lisa Kudrow as Phoebe Buffay in Friends (NBC) (Episodes: "The One Hundredth" + "The One Where Everybody Finds Out"); Lucy Liu as Ling Woo in Ally McBeal (Fox) (Episodes: "Angels and Blimps" + "Sex, Lies, and Politics"); Wendie Malick as Nina van Horn in Just Shoot Me! (NBC) (Episodes: "Two Girls for Every Boy" + "Slow Donnie"); Doris Roberts as Marie Barone in Everybody Loves Raymond (CBS) (Episodes: "The Toaster" + "Frank's Tribute")
Outstanding Supporting Actor in a Drama Series: Michael Badalucco as Jimmy Berluti in The Practice (ABC); Benjamin Bratt as Reynaldo Curtis in Law & Order (NBC); Steve Harris as Eugene Young in The Practice (ABC); Steven Hill as Adam Schiff in Law & Order (NBC); Noah Wyle as Dr. John Carter in ER (NBC)	Outstanding Supporting Actress in a Drama Series: Holland Taylor as Roberta Kittleson in The Practice (Episode: "End Games") (ABC); Lara Flynn Boyle as Helen Gamble in The Practice (ABC); Kim Delaney as Diane Russell in NYPD Blue (ABC); Camryn Manheim as Ellenor Frutt in The Practice (ABC); Nancy Marchand as Livia Soprano in The Sopranos (Episodes: "The Sopranos" + "46 Long") (HBO)
Outstanding Supporting Actor in a Miniseries or Movie: Peter O'Toole as Bishop Cauchon in Joan of Arc (CBS); Beau Bridges as E. K. Hornbeck in Inherit the Wind (Showtime); Don Cheadle as Sammy Davis Jr. in The Rat Pack (HBO); Peter Fonda as Frank O'Connor in The Passion of Ayn Rand (Showtime); Joe Mantegna as Dean Martin in The Rat Pack (HBO)	Outstanding Supporting Actress in a Miniseries or Movie: Anne Bancroft as Geraldine Eileen Cummins in Deep in My Heart (CBS); Jacqueline Bisset as Isabelle D'Arc in Joan of Arc (CBS); Olympia Dukakis as Mother Babette in Joan of Arc (CBS); Bebe Neuwirth as Dorothy Parker in Dash and Lilly (A&E); Cicely Tyson as Tante Lou in A Lesson Before Dying (HBO); Dianne Wiest as Sarah McClellan in The Simple Life of Noah Dearborn (CBS)

=== Directing ===
Outstanding Directing for a Comedy Series: Sports Night (ABC): "Pilot" – Thomas Schlamme; Ally McBeal (Fox): "Those Lips, That Hand" – Arlene Sanford; Everybody Loves Raymond (CBS): "Robert's Date" – Will Mackenzie; Friends (NBC): "The One Where Everybody Finds Out" – Michael Lembeck; Will & Grace (NBC): "Pilot" – James Burrows	Outstanding Directing for a Drama Series: NYPD Blue (ABC): "Hearts and Souls" – Paris Barclay; Law & Order (NBC): "Empire" – Matthew Penn; Law & Order/Homicide: Life on the Street (NBC): "Sideshow" – Edwin Sherin; The Sopranos (HBO): "The Sopranos" – David Chase
Outstanding Directing for a Variety or Music Program: 1998 Tony Awards (CBS) – Paul Miller; 41st Annual Grammy Awards (CBS) – Walter C. Miller; The Kennedy Center Honors: A Celebration of the Performing Arts (CBS) – Louis J. Horvitz; Saturday Night Live (NBC): "Host: Jennifer Love Hewitt" – Beth McCarthy-Miller; The Tonight Show with Jay Leno (NBC) – Ellen Brown	Outstanding Directing for a Miniseries or Movie: The Temptations (NBC) – Allan Arkush; The Baby Dance (Showtime) – Jane Anderson; Dash and Lilly (A&E) – Kathy Bates; Joan of Arc (A&E) – Christian Duguay; A Lesson Before Dying (HBO) – Joseph Sargent

=== Writing ===
Outstanding Writing for a Comedy Series: Frasier (NBC): "Merry Christmas, Mrs. Moskowitz" – Jay Kogen; Ally McBeal (Fox): "Sideshow" – David E. Kelley; Friends (NBC): "The One Where Everybody Finds Out" – Alexa Junge; Just Shoot Me! (NBC): "Slow Donnie" – Steven Levitan; Sports Night (ABC): "The Apology" – Aaron Sorkin	Outstanding Writing for a Drama Series: The Sopranos (HBO): "College" – James Manos Jr. and David Chase; NYPD Blue (ABC): "Hearts and Souls" – Story by : Steven Bochco, David Milch and Bill Clark Teleplay by : Nicholas Wootton; The Sopranos (HBO): "Isabella" – Robin Green and Mitchell Burgess; The Sopranos (HBO): "Nobody Knows Anything" – Frank Renzulli; The Sopranos (HBO): "The Sopranos" – David Chase
Outstanding Writing for a Variety or Music Program: The Chris Rock Show (HBO); Dennis Miller Live (HBO); Late Night with Conan O'Brien (NBC); Late Show with David Letterman (CBS); Mr. Show with Bob and David (HBO)	Outstanding Writing for a Miniseries or Movie: A Lesson Before Dying (HBO) – Ann Peacock; The Baby Dance (Showtime) – Jane Anderson; Dash and Lilly (A&E) – Jerrold L. Ludwig; Pirates of Silicon Valley (TNT) – Martyn Burke; The Rat Pack (HBO) – Kario Salem

== Most major nominations ==
Networks with multiple major nominations (Note: "Major" constitutes the categories listed above: Program, Acting, Directing, and Writing. Does not include the technical categories.)
Network	No. of Nominations
NBC	42
HBO	32
CBS	23
ABC	22
Fox	10

Programs with multiple major nominations
Program	Category	Network	No. of Nominations
The Sopranos	Drama	HBO	10
The Practice	Drama	ABC	7
Ally McBeal	Comedy	Fox	6
Dash and Lilly	Movie	A&E	6
Everybody Loves Raymond	Comedy	CBS	6
Joan of Arc	Miniseries	CBS	6
Law & Order	Drama	NBC	6
NYPD Blue	Drama	ABC	6
Frasier	Comedy	NBC	5
A Lesson Before Dying	Movie	HBO	5
The Baby Dance	Movie	Showtime	4
Friends	Comedy	NBC	4
The Rat Pack	Movie	HBO	4
Dennis Miller Live	Variety	HBO	3
ER	Drama	NBC	3
Just Shoot Me!	Comedy	NBC	3
3rd Rock from the Sun	Comedy	NBC	2
The 52nd Annual Tony Awards	Variety	CBS	2
The Chris Rock Show	Variety	HBO	2
Freak	Variety	HBO	2
George Carlin: You Are All Diseased	Variety	HBO	2
Inherit the Wind	Movie	Showtime	2
Late Show with David Letterman	Variety	CBS	2
Mad About You	Comedy	NBC	2
The Passion of Ayn Rand	Movie	Showtime	2
Pirates of Silicon Valley	Movie	TNT	2
Sex and the City	Comedy	HBO	2
Sports Night	Comedy	ABC	2
The Temptations	Miniseries	NBC	2
The Tonight Show with Jay Leno	Variety	NBC	2
Tracey Takes On...	Variety	HBO	2

== Most major awards ==
Networks with multiple major awards
Network	No. of Awards
HBO	7
ABC	6
NBC	6
CBS	5

Programs with multiple major awards
Program	Category	Network	No. of Awards
The Practice	Drama	ABC	3
3rd Rock from the Sun	Comedy	NBC	2
The 52nd Annual Tony Awards	Variety	CBS	2
Frasier	Comedy	NBC	2
A Lesson Before Dying	Movie	HBO	2
NYPD Blue	Drama	ABC	2
The Sopranos	Drama	HBO	2

== In Memoriam ==
The "In Memoriam" segment was presented by actor Noah Wyle, to honor the TV personalities who died since last year's ceremony. The following people were included:

- Ellen Corby
- Richard Denning
- Gary Morton - producer
- Mary Frann
- Anthony Newley
- Mark Warren - director
- Norman Fell
- Dana Plato
- Noam Pitlik - director
- Dick O'Neill
- Sylvia Sidney
- David Strickland
- Peggy Cass
- Virginia Graham
- Dane Clark
- Ed Herlihy - announcer
- Mel Tormé
- Mario Puzo - writer
- Bill Wendell - announcer
- John Holliman - journalist
- Rory Calhoun
- Susan Strasberg
- Allen Funt
- Joseph Cates - producer
- Esther Rolle
- Roddy McDowall
- Gene Siskel
- Flip Wilson
- DeForest Kelley
- Gene Autry
