= One West Waikiki =

- Cheryl Ladd and Richard Burgi of One West Waikiki
- Genre: Crime drama
- Created by: Glen A. Larson
- Written by: Glen A. Larson; Gail Morgan Hickman; Stephen A. Miller; Gregory S. Dinallo
- Directed by: Peter H. Hunt; Steve Stafford; Jerry Thorpe; Bruce Bilson
- Starring: Cheryl Ladd; Richard Burgi; Elsie Sniffen; Ogie Zulueta; Paul Gleason
- Country of origin: United States
- Original language: English
- No. of seasons: 2
- No. of episodes: 19

Production
- Executive producer: Glen A. Larson
- Producers: Gail Morgan Hickman; Stephen A. Miller
- Production companies: Larson Entertainment; Rysher Entertainment

Original release
- Network: CBS (season 1); First-run syndication (season 2)
- Release: August 4, 1994 – May 25, 1996

One West Waikiki is an American crime drama television series that aired on CBS from August 4, 1994 until September 8, 1994, and then in first-run syndication for its second season from October 15, 1995 until May 25, 1996. The series was set in Hawaii, and starred Cheryl Ladd and Richard Burgi.

The program was created by Glen A. Larson. The New York Times reported that the show's producers sought a summer slot in order to raise money for filming more episodes because "They had already sold the idea of the program to international broadcasters".

== Plot ==
Dr. Dawn "Holli" Holliday (Cheryl Ladd), a forensics expert formerly of the Los Angeles Coroner's Office, is appointed as the Hawaiian Police Department's medical examiner. She finds herself at odds with Lt. Mack Wolfe (Richard Burgi), Honolulu PD's No.1 homicide detective. They have a love-hate relationship yet they must cooperate in order to solve various crimes.

== Cast ==
=== Main / regular ===
- Cheryl Ladd as Dr. Dawn "Holli" Holliday
- Richard Burgi as Lt. Mack Wolfe
- Ogie Zulueta as Kimo
- Paul Gleason as Captain Dave Herzog
- Kayla Blake as Nui Shaw

=== Guests ===
- Adrienne Barbeau as Edna Jaynea (1 episode)
- Alexandra Wilson (1 episode)
- Barbara Alyn Woods as Heather Randall (1 episode)
- Daniel von Bargen as Captain Charlie Dalton (1 episode)
- Denise Richards as Deirdre Mansfield (1 episode)
- James Pickens Jr. (1 episode)
- John Clayton as Detective Dennis Allen (1 episode)
- Julia Nickson as Laura Greystone (2 episodes)
- Kristen Cloke as Wendy Cochran (1 episode)
- Leanna Creel as Marisa Coppage (1 episode)
- Mark Dacascos as Moku (1 episode)
- Nephi Hannemann (6 episodes)
- Nicholas Bell as George (1 episode)
- Rebecca Staab as Rebecca Dunn (3 episodes)
- Robert Pine as Mr Bryan (1 episode)
- Steve Inwood as Allie Wade (1 episode)
- Tamlyn Tomita as Taylor Chun (1 episode)
- Taylor Wily as Sumo wrestler (1 episode)

== Filming and distribution ==
Most of the series was filmed at Hawaii Film Studio at Diamond Head, but episodes were also filmed in San Diego, American Samoa, and New Zealand. Episodes were broadcast in Canada, Europe, New Zealand, and Singapore.

== Episodes ==
=== Series overview ===
Season	Episodes	Originally released	
Season	Episodes	First released	Last released
1	6	August 4, 1994	September 8, 1994
2	13	October 15, 1995	May 25, 1996

=== Season 1 (1994) ===
No. overall	No. in season	Title	Original release date	Prod. code
1	1	"Pilot" "'Til Death Do Us Part"	August 4, 1994	100
Note: Aired as a 2-hour television movie.
2	2	"Vanishing Act"	August 11, 1994	102
3	3	"Terminal Island"	August 18, 1994	104
4	4	"A Model for Murder"	August 25, 1994	103
5	5	"Along Came a Spider"	September 1, 1994	101
6	6	"Scales of Justice"	September 8, 1994	105

=== Season 2 (1995–96) ===
No. overall	No. in season	Title	Original release date	Prod. code
7	1	"Flowers of Evil"	October 15, 1995	112
8	2	"Holliday on Ice"	October 21, 1995	108
9	3	"Manpower"	November 4, 1995	107
10	4	"Unhappily Ever After"	November 11, 1995	109
11	5	"The Dead Don't Lie"	November 18, 1995	111
12	6	"Past Due"	December 2, 1995	110
13	7	"Rest in Peace"	February 3, 1996	115
14	8	"Guilty"	February 9, 1996	114
15	9	"The Romanoff Affair"	February 17, 1996	117
16	10	"The South Seas Connection"	February 24, 1996	118
17	11	"Kingmare on Night Street"	March 2, 1996	116
18	12	"Battle of the Titans"	April 27, 1996	113
19	13	"Allergic to Golf"	May 25, 1996	106
