= Pottersville (film) =

- Theatrical release poster
- Directed by: Rodney Buyea
- Written by: Liam Stahl
- Produced by: Josh Crook; Jonathan Gray; Ron Perlman; Patricia Hearst
- Starring: Michael Shannon; Judy Greer; Thomas Lennon; Ron Perlman; Christina Hendricks; Ian McShane
- Cinematography: Damian Horan
- Edited by: Steve Morrison; Joel Plotch
- Music by: Brando Triantafillou
- Production companies: Wing and a Prayer Pictures; Big Jack Productions; Storyland Pictures; Plot 4 Productions
- Distributed by: Echo Bridge
- Release date: November 10, 2017
- Running time: 84 minutes
- Country: United States
- Language: English

Pottersville is a 2017 American Christmas comedy film directed by Rodney Buyea and written by Liam Stahl. The film stars Michael Shannon, Judy Greer, Thomas Lennon, Ron Perlman, Christina Hendricks, and Ian McShane. The film was released on November 10, 2017, by Echo Bridge.

== Plot ==
It's Christmastime, Maynard Greiger is a general store owner in Pottersville, a small town struggling since the local mill closed. Returning home early from work to surprise his wife, Connie, he finds that she is a furry, along with Jack, the sheriff. Connie states that she needs more excitement in her life, and would like some time apart.

After drunkenly returning to his store and telling his story to Parker, his clerk, Maynard dresses up in a gorilla costume and walks around town, startling many of the townspeople. The next morning, he awakes to find he was misidentified as Bigfoot. Intending to confess, Maynard realizes the potential economic benefits from tourism that Bigfoot sightings may bring, so continues to dress up.

As the hype continues to grow about Bigfoot, the town is visited by Brock Masterson, the host of a monster-hunting reality television show. Although he pretends to be finding evidence of Bigfoot for his show, he is privately skeptical of its existence. After encountering Maynard in costume, Brock becomes scared to continue, and wishes to leave town.

Brock decides to continue his search for Bigfoot, with the help of Jack and Bart, a local hunter. Back in town, Parker discovers that Maynard has been dressing up as Bigfoot, and attempts to dissuade him from dressing up again, for fear that Bart will shoot him. Maynard decides to dress up again anyway, and is captured by Brock.

Brock brings "Bigfoot" back to town, where Parker reveals that it is Maynard in a gorilla suit. Brock announces his intention to sue the town, and the angry townspeople force him to close the store. Parker meets with the townspeople, and shows them that Maynard simply wishes to help the town; his ledger that he ostensibly used to keep an account of their purchases on credit, is left blank.

The townspeople forgive Maynard, and proceed to his store to apologize and pay their debts. Connie forgives him, asking him to take her back, but he refuses. Brock is discovered to be a fraud, and is fired from his television show. Realizing the global interest in Bigfoot, Maynard and Parker reopen the Pottersville Mill as a museum about Bigfoot. As Maynard and Parker kiss, they hear an ominous howl in the distance.

== Cast ==
- Michael Shannon as Maynard Greiger
- Judy Greer as Parker
- Ron Perlman as Sheriff Jack
- Thomas Lennon as Brock Masterson
- Christina Hendricks as Connie Greiger
- Ian McShane as Bart
- Michael Torpey as Norm
- Blake Perlman as Tammy Henderson
- Greta Lee as Ilene
- Elena Hurst as Stacy Gutierrez
- Timothy Davis-Reed as John Logan
- Mary Ashley Arenson as Sue
- Julian Lerner as Samuel

== Production ==
Pottersville was filmed in Hamilton and Syracuse, New York. Six students from nearby Colgate University received internships for the production, and one faculty member served as an extra in the film. Principal photography ended in May 2016.

== Release ==
The film premiered at the Hamilton Movie Theater in Hamilton on November 10, 2017. Following a limited theater release, the film was released on DVD and streaming services by Echo Bridge.

=== Critical response ===
On Rotten Tomatoes, the film holds an approval rating of 0% based on six reviews, with an average rating of 2.3/10.

== Music ==
Pottersville features a mix of classic Christmas tunes. Pottersville (Original Motion Picture Soundtrack) was released December 15, 2017.

Pottersville (Original Motion Picture Soundtrack) Track Listing
No.	Title	Performer	Length
1	"Sleigh Ride"	The Andrews Sisters	3:05
2	"Oh My Yeti"	Tom Lennon	1:16
3	"Joy to the World"	Gene Autry	1:58
4	"Christmas Time"	The Debbonaires	2:51
5	"Jingle Bells"	Carte Blanche	2:49
6	"Deck the Halls"	The Mantovani Orchestra	2:44
7	"O Christmas Tree"	The Mantovani Orchestra	2:30
8	"The Furry Hoedown"	Brando Triantafillou	2:22
9	"Baby, It's Cold Outside"	Carte Blanche	3:38
10	"Silent Night"	Kitty Wells	3:21
11	"Rudolph, the Red-Nosed Reindeer"	Rosemary Clooney	2:22

== See also ==
- List of Christmas films
