= Jeff Mooring =

American actor

Jeff Mooring is an American retired actor. He is best known for portraying Dave on the television series Sports Night. He also appeared on The West Wing, The Nanny, Murphy Brown, The Hit List, The Cosby Show and others.

== Early life and education ==
Mooring was born in Norfolk, Virginia, and attended the University of North Carolina School of the Arts. After moving to New York city, he briefly studied dance at the Alvin Ailey American Dance Theater.

== Career ==
He worked as a backup dancer and singer for Mexican pop singer Celi Bee and toured with Broadway productions of West Side Story, Swing!, Evita and others. He later appeared in a small role on The Cosby Show and began appearing in television.

== Filmography ==
=== Film ===
Year	Title	Role	Notes
1990	The First Power	Uniform Cop #2	
2011	The Hit List	Fred Gates	

=== Television ===
Year	Title	Role	Notes
1985	The Cosby Show	Greg	Episode: "Clair's Sister"
1987	Ohara	Harris	Episode: "Laura"
1988	Our House	Officer	Episode: "Two Beat, Four Beat"
1988	Houston Knights	Player	Episode: "Cajun Spice"
1988	Amen	Reverend Junior	Episode: "The Fantasy"
1988	CBS Summer Playhouse	Charlie's Partner	Episode: "Off Duty"
1989	Murphy Brown	Stage Manager	Episode: "TV or Not TV"
1990	A Quiet Little Neighborhood, a Perfect Little Murder	Darrell	Television film
1996, 1996	The Nanny	Bartender / Waiter	2 episodes
1998–2000	Sports Night	Dave	44 episodes
2001	Off Centre	Morris	2 episodes
2001–2003	The West Wing	Reporter Phil	5 episodes
