= Kayla Blake =

American actress

- Born: December 4, 1963 (age 62); Honolulu, Hawaii, USA

Kayla Blake (born Elsie Mapuana Sniffen; December 4, 1963) is an American actress. She is also credited as Elsie Sniffen. She is best known for the role of Kim on the ABC Television series Sports Night.

== Career ==
Blake starred on One West Waikiki (1994–1996) as Nui Shaw. Blake had a recurring role as Kim, an associate producer, in the television series Sports Night which lasted two seasons from 1998 to 2000. She has made minor guest appearances on other TV series, including Without a Trace, Fame, and in the recurring role of Trish on the CBS-TV soap opera series The Bold and The Beautiful, where she appeared in five episodes (1988–93).

She has also appeared in minor roles in films such as Lambada (1990), Basic Instinct (1992) and Four Christmases (2008).

== Personal life ==
She has been married to Robert Check since September 28, 2002.

== Filmography ==
=== Film ===
Year	Title	Role	Notes
1990	Lambada	Bookworm	
1992	Basic Instinct	Roxy's Friend	
1994	Exit to Eden	Police Woman	
2008	Four Christmases	Nurse	
2012	A Thousand Words	Emily	
2016	Moana	Additional voices	

=== Television ===
Year	Title	Role	Notes
1986	Tall Tales & Legends	Dancer	Episode: "John Henry"
1986–1987	Fame	Dancer	24 episodes
1988–1993	The Bold and the Beautiful	Trish	24 episodes
1989	China Beach	Pei	Episode: "China Men"
1993	Big Wave Dave's	Polynesian Girl	Episode: "Pilot"
1994	Night Driving	Tam	Television film
1994–1996	One West Waikiki	Nui Shaw	20 episodes
1996	Nowhere Man	Jenny Tsu	Episode: "Marathon"
1997	Hawaii Five-O	Rellica Sun	Episode: "Pilot"
1998	Brother's Keeper	Nurse	Episode: "Pilot"
1998–2000	Sports Night	Kim	45 episodes
2001	Ball & Chain	Diane Woo	Television film
2003	JAG	Secretary to Catherine Gale	Episode: "Pas de Deux"
2008	Without a Trace	Sheila	Episode: "4G"
2010	The Young and the Restless	Doctor Lori Miyamoto	Episode #1.9415
2016	Joy	Sook	2 episodes
2017	House of Cards	Kerry Kuilima	Episode: "Chapter 57"
2019	L.A.'s Finest	Adelia	Episode: "...My Lovely"
2021	For All Mankind	Dr. Kouri	3 episodes
2021	American Horror Story: Double Feature	Doctor	2 episodes
2023	Beef	Dr Catherine Lin	2 episodes
2025	The Pitt	Rita Kitajima	2 episodes
