= Ron Ostrow =

American actor

Ron Ostrow is an American actor who mostly appears on television. His first major credit was in the Aaron Sorkin movie A Few Good Men in 1992, in which he played an MP. He was also in the original stage version, playing the role of The Sentry. He has since appeared in many other Sorkin projects, including Sports Night, The West Wing, Studio 60 on the Sunset Strip and The Newsroom. He has played guest- and recurring roles on several other television series, including Law & Order, Party of Five, Fired Up, Star Trek: Voyager, Ally McBeal, Boston Legal and Scandal, and has appeared in the films Charlie Wilson's War and The Incredible Burt Wonderstone.

== Filmography ==
- Cadillac Man (1990) as Police Officer (uncredited)
- Law & Order (1991–1994, TV Series) as CSU Tech #1 / Whalen
- A Few Good Men (1992) as M.P.
- Quiz Show (1994) as Photographer (uncredited)
- The Jerky Boys (1995) as Fast Food Family Man
- General Hospital (1996–2008, TV Series) as Pilot / Dr. Austin / Quartermaine's Pilot
- Party of Five (1997, TV Series) as Minister
- Port Charles (1997, TV Series) as A. D. A.
- Fired Up (1997–1998, TV Series) as Johnny / Man #3 / Bear #1
- Tracey Takes On... (1998, TV Series) as Photographer
- Star Trek: Voyager (1998, TV Series) as Borg Drone
- Bulworth (1998) as Staff Member
- The Rat Pack (1998, TV Movie) as Studio Head
- Sports Night (1998–2000, TV Series) as Will
- The Norm Show (2000–2001, TV Series) as Man
- Ally McBeal (2001, TV Series) as Attorney Martin Fixx
- Grounded for Life (2001, TV Series) as Timothy
- Unsolved Mysteries (2002, TV Series documentary) as Fred's Lawyer
- Firefly (2002, TV Series) as Commander
- The West Wing (2002–2005, TV Series) as Reporter John / John / John - Reporter #5
- Mister Sterling (2003, TV Series) as Governor's Aide #2
- Scrubs (2003, TV Series) as Mr. Foster
- Yes, Dear (2003, TV Series) as Doctor
- A Minute with Stan Hooper (2003, TV Series) as Townsperson
- What I Like About You (2003, TV Series) as Minister
- 2010: A Kitchen Odyssey (2005)
- Boston Legal (2005–2007, TV Series) as Attorney Cone
- Studio 60 on the Sunset Strip (2006, TV Series) as Richard
- Women of a Certain Age (2006, TV Movie) as Danny Shrier
- The Nine (2006–2007, TV Series) as TV Reporter / Reporter #3
- Charlie Wilson's War (2007) as Congressional Committee #5 (uncredited)
- Dirty Sexy Money (2008, TV Series) as Reporter / Reporter #1
- AmericanEast (2008) as Local news reporter
- Better with You (2010–2011, TV Series) as Bar Regular #2 / Gage Attendant
- The Newsroom (2012, TV Series) as Passenger #1
- Scandal (2012-2013, TV Series) as Secret Service Agent / Agent Bryce / Nigel Sarnoff
- Dark Skies (2013) as Richard Klein
- The Incredible Burt Wonderstone (2013) as Jim the Bartender
- Modern Family (2013, TV Series) as Married Man
