= Greg Baker =

American actor

- Born: Gregory Baker; April 16, 1968 (age 58); Saint Paul, Minnesota, U.S.
- Occupations: Actor, editor
- Years active: 1996–2012

Gregory Baker (born April 16, 1968 in Saint Paul, Minnesota) is an American actor and editor. He is perhaps best known for his recurring roles as Elliott, a producer on the show Sports Night, Mr. Corelli, Miley Stewart's history teacher on Hannah Montana and his main lead role Burger Pitt on I'm in the Band.

== Filmography ==
=== Television ===
Year	Title	Role	Episodes
1997	Step by Step	Drew	"The Big Date"
1998	Suddenly Susan	Michael	"Matchmater, Matchmaker"
1998	Saved by the Bell: The New Class		"Guess Who's Running the Max"
1998	As Seen On	Host	
1998–2000	Sports Night	Elliott	45 episodes
2000	The Hughleys	Crazy Larry	"Scary Hughley"
2001	The West Wing	Interviewer	"Ellie"
2001	Three Sisters	Ron	"It's a Wonderful Life"
2002	That's Life	Co-Worker	"What's Family Got to Do with It?"
2002	Grounded for Life	Guy	"Is She Really Going Out with Walt?"
2002	Lizzie McGuire	Security Guard	"In Miranda Lizzie Does Not Trust"
2003	The District	Clerk	"Jupiter for Sale"
2006	ER	Highsmith	"Out on a Limb"
2006–2009	Hannah Montana	Mr. Corelli	9 episodes
2007	Bones	Melvin Gallagher	"The Killer in the Concrete"
2009–2011	I'm in the Band	Burger Pitt	Main Role (41 episodes)

=== Film ===
Year	Title	Role
1996	D'Angel Among Us	Hollander/Mark Goodheart
1999	Ballad of the Nightingale	
2001	Thank Heaven	Paul Jones
2001	Blown Chance	Friend
2004	Little Black Book	Guy #2 at Bar
2005	The Life Coach	Francis "LC" O'Reilly
2007	He Was a Quiet Man	Copy Boy
2012	Letting Go	The Maverick Editor
