= Sports Night =

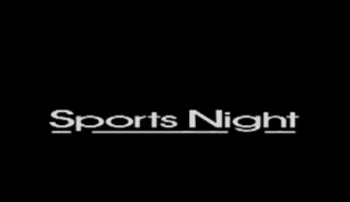
- Genre: Comedy drama
- Created by: Aaron Sorkin
- Starring: Josh Charles; Peter Krause; Felicity Huffman; Joshua Malina; Sabrina Lloyd; Robert Guillaume
- Composer: W. G. Snuffy Walden
- Country of origin: United States
- Original language: English
- No. of seasons: 2
- No. of episodes: 45

Production
- Running time: 22 minutes
- Production companies: Imagine Television; Touchstone Television

Original release
- Network: ABC
- Release: September 22, 1998 – May 16, 2000

Sports Night is an American comedy drama television series about a fictional sports news show of the same name. It focuses on the friendships, pitfalls and ethical issues the creative talent of the program face while trying to produce a good show under constant network pressure. Created by Aaron Sorkin and produced by Imagine Television and Touchstone Television, the half-hour prime time comedy drama aired on ABC for two seasons, from September 22, 1998, to May 16, 2000.

The show stars Robert Guillaume as managing editor Isaac Jaffe, Felicity Huffman as executive producer Dana Whitaker, Peter Krause as anchor Casey McCall, Josh Charles as anchor Dan Rydell, Sabrina Lloyd as senior associate producer Natalie Hurley, and Joshua Malina as associate producer Jeremy Goodwin. Regular guest stars included William H. Macy as ratings expert Sam Donovan and Brenda Strong as Sally Sasser, the producer of West Coast Update (a sister show on the same network as Sports Night) and professional and romantic rival of Dana. Other notable guest stars included Paula Marshall and several who later appeared on Sorkin's The West Wing including Janel Moloney, Teri Polo, Ted McGinley, Lisa Edelstein, Clark Gregg, Nina Siemaszko, John de Lancie, Timothy Davis-Reed, Cress Williams, Nadia Dajani, and Spencer Garrett.

TV Guide ranked it #10 on their 2013 list of 60 shows that were "Cancelled Too Soon". In 2025, the show ranked #8 on a TVLine list of television's best two-season shows.

== Overview ==
The show is said to be a semi-fictional account of the ESPN SportsCenter team of Keith Olbermann and Dan Patrick, with Rydell representing Olbermann and McCall representing Patrick. Patrick has confirmed this on his syndicated radio program The Dan Patrick Show. It has also been said that many of the storylines for McCall were inspired by Craig Kilborn, who was an anchor on SportsCenter during the mid 1990s.

The fictional Sports Night is a sports news program in the style of SportsCenter or CNN Sports Tonight. The show broadcasts live from 11 pm to midnight and is rebroadcast through the next morning; it may broadcast at other times for special events, such as the NFL draft. The program debuted in 1996 and airs from New York City on the fictional Continental Sports Channel (CSC), a unit of Continental Corp, owned and run by Luther Sachs. Continental Corp owns cable networks around the United States; when the company is offered for sale, bidders include Time Warner, Disney (which, incidentally, owns a majority of ESPN in reality), and News Corporation.

Dialogue in a Season 2 episode suggests the studio is located in Rockefeller Center, although establishing shots regularly showed the World Trade Center. Production took place in Burbank, California, with Sorkin splitting time between Sports Night and the first season of The West Wing in the second season.

Both the fictional show and the network have competitive and financial difficulties. The network, according to Continental Corp's CFO, has an annual deficit up to $120 million. Although Sports Night does better than CNN/SI, Dana Whitaker says that Sports Night is "in third place. We are getting our asses kicked by ESPN and Fox". Natalie Hurley replies, "Every show on this network is in third place. It's a third-place network." When Sports Night is asked to interview Michael Jordan about his new perfume, the retired basketball star's publicity team demands final cut privilege—something it would not ask Fox or ESPN—because it believes that Sports Night is more desperate for ratings.

Although the first season of Sports Night is a sitcom, it often is portrayed as more of a comedy drama representative of some of Sorkin's later work on The West Wing. Sorkin intended for the series' humor to be drier and more realistic than typical sitcoms. He initially wanted the show to be recorded without a laugh track, but ABC network executives insisted on including one. The volume of the laugh track faded as Season One continued and was abandoned at the beginning of Season Two.

The dialogue is often delivered at a rapid-fire pace and intentionally exposes many aspects of communication that go beyond the words that are spoken. The show also frequently employed a technique known as "walk and talk", where the characters are walking from one location to the next while in conversation. This is another characteristic of Sorkin's shows as "walk and talks" are used quite frequently in The West Wing and Studio 60 on the Sunset Strip. A number of similar themes, elements and actors carried over from Sports Night to The West Wing and later Studio 60 on the Sunset Strip.

The show's main focus is the relationships between the characters. These include an off-again on-again flirtation and romance between Dana and Casey, the partnership of Natalie and Jeremy, and Dan's ongoing problems with relationships in general. The character of Isaac Jaffe hovers over his staff as a benevolent but uncompromising father figure.

The show is mostly set in the studio and station offices. However, in the second season, Anthony's, a local sports bar and restaurant, was introduced as another location for scenes out of the work environment.

Guillaume suffered a stroke midway through the first season and this event was worked into his character and the season's story arc.

Sports Night struggled to find an audience and ABC cancelled it after two seasons. Although it had the opportunity to move to several different networks, including HBO, Showtime and USA, Sorkin decided to let the show pass so that he could focus on The West Wing.

== Cast ==
- Josh Charles – Daniel "Dan" Rydell, Co-Anchor. A graduate of Dartmouth College, he has known Casey for 10 years as of the show's first season and they have worked together for five years. Before Sports Night they co-hosted a sports show in Dallas.
- Peter Krause – Casey McCall, Co-Anchor. He turned down an offer from NBC to replace David Letterman in 1993. Casey divorced Lisa, his college girlfriend, after 10 years of marriage just before the show's first season.
- Felicity Huffman – Dana Whitaker, Executive Producer. She has been friends with Casey since college and there is romantic tension between the two of them.
- Joshua Malina – Jeremy Goodwin, Associate Producer & Research Analyst who has an on-again off-again relationship with Natalie.
- Sabrina Lloyd – Natalie Hurley, Senior Associate Producer who has an on-again off-again relationship with Jeremy.
- Robert Guillaume – Isaac Jaffe, Managing Editor. A Pulitzer Prize-winning journalist who began with the Atlanta Journal and ended his career as London bureau chief for CNN. A lifelong sports fan who attended the Giants-Dodgers game that decided the 1951 National League pennant, he agreed to come out of retirement when Continental Corp began a sports cable channel.

=== Supporting cast ===
- Kayla Blake – Kim, Associate Producer
- Greg Baker – Elliott, Associate Producer
- Jeff Mooring – Dave, Director
- Ron Ostrow – Will, Technician
- Timothy Davis-Reed – Chris, Technician
- William H. Macy – Sam Donovan, CSC Ratings Advisor (season 2)
- Teri Polo – Rebecca Wells, Market Analyst for Continental Corp.
- Brenda Strong – Sally Sasser, Executive Producer of West Coast Update
- Robert Mailhouse – J.J., Network Advisor
- Ted McGinley – Gordon Gage (season 1)
- Jayne Brook – Abby Jacobs (season 2)
- Paula Marshall – Jenny (season 2)
- Megan Ward – Pixley (season 2)
- Clark Gregg – Calvin Trager (season 2)

== Episodes ==
=== Series overview ===
On November 5, 2002, Walt Disney Studios Home Entertainment released the entire series on DVD in Region 1 for the first time.

A special 10th Anniversary Edition Sports Night DVD set was released on September 30, 2008, from Shout! Factory with new bonus features including all-new interviews with creator Aaron Sorkin and cast & crew, featurettes and commentaries. Also included is a commemorative 36-page booklet.

In March 2010, Shout! Factory released Sports Night: Season One on DVD with just 16 episodes.

Season	Episodes	Originally released		U.S. ratings	Rank
Season	Episodes	First released	Last released	U.S. ratings	Rank
1	23	September 22, 1998	May 4, 1999	10.5 million	#65
2	22	October 5, 1999	May 16, 2000	11.5 million	#49

=== Season 1 (1998–99) ===
No. overall	No. in season	Title	Directed by	Written by	Original release date	Prod. code	US viewers (millions)
1	1	"Pilot"	Thomas Schlamme	Aaron Sorkin	September 22, 1998	N-301	12.56
Already at odds with the network over Casey's recent lack of professionalism, the team is struggling to get the go-ahead to air a human interest feature on an African runner who's about to compete in his first major race since recovering from a potentially career-ending leg injury. Natalie finds herself attracted to Jeremy, a nerdy and knowledgeable applicant for an opening on the production team.
2	2	"The Apology"	Thomas Schlamme	Aaron Sorkin	September 29, 1998	N-302	10.48
The network is upset when a magazine quotes Dan as saying that he favours the decriminalization of marijuana. When he is forced to give an on-air apology, he dedicates it to his little brother who died in a car accident while intoxicated.
3	3	"The Hungry and the Hunted"	Thomas Schlamme	Aaron Sorkin	October 6, 1998	N-303	12.39
Isaac sends Jeremy out on his first line producing job, covering hunting. Natalie uses a company function to encourage Casey and Dana to date, but when they get there they discover she is on a date with a man named "Gordon" (Ted McGinley). When Jeremy returns from the hunting trip, he is visibly shaken by what he has seen.
4	4	"Intellectual Property"	Thomas Schlamme	Aaron Sorkin	October 13, 1998	N-304	10.48
Casey is jealous of Dana's relationship with Gordon. Dan is reprimanded for singing "Happy Birthday" to Casey on the air, because the network was forced to pay royalties to the song's copyright holder, and wants everybody on the team to choose a public domain song for him to sing on their birthdays.
5	5	"Mary Pat Shelby"	Thomas Schlamme	Tracey Stern and Aaron Sorkin	October 20, 1998	N-305	10.11
The team tries to score an exclusive interview with Christian Patrick, a football player who's under investigation for sexually assaulting his ex-girlfriend, but Patrick's agent will only grant the interview if the assault allegation is off limits. Natalie is sent to conduct a pre-interview with him, but comes back with an injured wrist. All hell breaks loose when the team learns that a stadium employee saw Patrick physically attack a female sports reporter in the locker room.
6	6	"The Head Coach, Dinner and the Morning Mail"	Thomas Schlamme	Matt Tarses and Aaron Sorkin	October 27, 1998	N-306	11.07
Still on edge from the Christian Patrick incident and the hate mail she's receiving from football fans for deciding to press charges, Natalie is distracted and keeps messing up her work. The team is cutting her some slack, but the show is beginning to suffer. Jeremy wants to take Natalie out to dinner to comfort and support her, but is having trouble choosing a restaurant.
7	7	"Dear Louise"	Thomas Schlamme	David Walpert and Aaron Sorkin	November 10, 1998	N-307	11.72
Jeremy writes a letter to his sister Louise, describing a day in the office. Dan struggles with writer's block and Natalie tries to help him by acting as if it were the hiccups. Isaac is unhappy that his teenage daughter is dating a young Republican.
8	8	"Thespis"	Thomas Schlamme	Aaron Sorkin	November 17, 1998	N-309	11.38
The mischievous Greek ghost Thespis is in the building, causing havoc with the show. Dana worries about impressing her mother at Thanksgiving dinner, while Isaac worries about his oldest daughter's pregnancy complications.
9	9	"The Quality of Mercy at 29K"	Thomas Schlamme	Bill Wrubel and Aaron Sorkin	December 1, 1998	N-308	11.39
The team is covering a mountaineering expedition that is close to the top of Mount Everest. Dana develops a surprising interest in Broadway musicals after taking her niece to see The Lion King. Dan struggles to find a charity to support.
10	10	"Shoe Money Tonight"	Dennie Gordon	Aaron Sorkin	December 8, 1998	N-310	11.38
Another anchor team's flight is grounded in Pittsburgh, forcing Casey and Dan to stay at work instead of taking a planned weekend trip to Atlantic City — but they turn disappointment into opportunity, challenging the rest of the team to an office poker night.
11	11	"The Six Southern Gentlemen of Tennessee"	Robert Berlinger	Aaron Sorkin and Matt Tarses & David Walpert & Bill Wrubel	December 15, 1998	N-311	11.17
Casey appears on The View, but upsets some of his coworkers when he accepts a compliment on his clothes without giving credit to the wardrobe staff. Seven college football players in Tennessee are suspended for refusing to play under the Confederate Flag and Isaac resists the idea that he's obliged to get personally involved in the story just because he's black.
12	12	"Smoky"	Robert Berlinger	Aaron Sorkin	January 5, 1999	N-313	12.55
Isaac is worried about his job because he spoke out on the Confederate Flag issue. Dan thinks Casey should start dating again.
13	13	"Small Town"	Thomas Schlamme	Paul Redford and Aaron Sorkin	January 12, 1999	N-314	11.52
Natalie is in the producer's chair for the night when Dana, Gordon, Casey and a woman from Gordon's office go on a double-date. When a rumor about a major player trade starts filtering through the gossip mill, the production staff scrambles to land an exclusive scoop. Dan has to contend with fill-in co-anchor Bobbi Bernstein (Lisa Edelstein), who claims that Dan once had sex with her in a hotel in Spain.
14	14	"Rebecca"	Thomas Schlamme	Aaron Sorkin	January 26, 1999	N-315	10.42
Dan is intrigued by Rebecca Wells (Teri Polo), an analyst in the network's marketing department who may or may not have flirted with him in the elevator. Dana is worried that Gordon wants to break up with her, and Isaac is flustered by a critical newspaper article.
15	15	"Dana and the Deep Blue Sea"	Thomas Schlamme	Aaron Sorkin	February 9, 1999	N-316	10.62
Gordon invites Dana on a snorkeling trip, but Dana is afraid of fish. Dan tries to convince Jeremy to put in a good word for him with Rebecca. Note: This episode was a direct continuation of the Spin City episode "Internal Affairs" on the original air date.
16	16	"Sally"	Robert Berlinger	Rachel Sweet and Aaron Sorkin	February 23, 1999	N-312	9.88
Gordon stands Dana up, which makes her worried about their relationship. Jeremy is nervous about spending the weekend with Natalie's family, fearing conflict because they're Catholic and he's Jewish. Dan discovers that Casey has slept with Sally. Casey discovers that Gordon has also slept with Sally and confronts him about it.
17	17	"How Are Things in Glocca Morra?"	Marc Buckland	Aaron Sorkin	March 9, 1999	N-317	9.76
A tennis match has gone longer than expected, delaying Sports Night and messing up Dana's dinner plans with Gordon. The network allows Dana to hand off the show to Sally and Casey is shocked and offended when Dana decides to do exactly that.
18	18	"The Sword of Orion"	Robert Berlinger	David Handelman & Mark McKinney and Aaron Sorkin	March 23, 1999	N-318	8.55
When Jeremy learns that his parents are divorcing, he becomes obsessed with finding out what happened to The Sword of Orion, a yacht which went off course and wrecked during a sailing competition 10 years before. Dan tries to convince Rebecca to watch a baseball game with him.
19	19	"Eli's Coming"	Robert Berlinger	Aaron Sorkin	March 30, 1999	N-319	8.89
Dan's having a truly horrible day: first he sees Rebecca talking to her ex-husband, and then Bobbi Bernstein's back again to cover a college basketball event. The team is worried when they don't hear from Isaac long after his flight from London lands. They eventually find out that Isaac had a stroke.
20	20	"Ordnance Tactics"	Alex Graves	S : Paul Redford; T : Aaron Sorkin	April 6, 1999	N-320	10.08
Dana is in charge while Isaac is in the hospital and the network is coming down hard. As if that weren't enough to put everybody on edge, someone has phoned in an anonymous bomb threat.
21	21	"Ten Wickets"	Robert Berlinger	S : Matt Tarses; T : Aaron Sorkin	April 13, 1999	N-321	9.90
A cricket player in India has taken all ten wickets in an inning. It is a major story, and the team is willing to cover it on the show except they don't know what it means. Casey's been making Jerry Falwell jokes on the air ever since the bomb threat and Dana wants him to knock it off. Rebecca tells Dan she wants to go back to her husband.
22	22	"Napoleon's Battle Plan"	Robert Berlinger	Aaron Sorkin	April 27, 1999	N-322	10.93
Gordon has proposed to Dana. Casey's response is to follow Napoleon's battle plan ("Show up, and see what happens"), but Dan isn't sure that's a good idea: Napoleon lost, after all. Dana, for her part, sublimates her mixed feelings about Gordon's proposal by developing a high-end camera obsession. When she finally finds out that Gordon and Casey both slept with Sally, she's more upset about Casey.
23	23	"What Kind of Day Has It Been?"	Thomas Schlamme	Aaron Sorkin	May 4, 1999	N-323	10.78
Dana buys the new camera and wants to take a staff photo. Casey's son Charlie comes to visit. Jeremy is following a baseball game in the hopes that the losing team might get a ninth inning rally. Just when everything has gone wrong and Dana is desperate for something good to happen, Isaac arrives for a visit.

=== Season 2 (1999–2000) ===
No. overall	No. in season	Title	Directed by	Written by	Original release date	Prod. code	US viewers (millions)
24	1	"Special Powers"	Thomas Schlamme	Aaron Sorkin	October 5, 1999	N-324	12.38
Casey tries to find the courage to ask Dana on a date. Jeremy and Natalie have a fight after Natalie is offered a job in Galveston. Isaac is back at work, but the stroke appears to be affecting his job performance.
25	2	"When Something Wicked This Way Comes"	Robert Berlinger	Aaron Sorkin	October 12, 1999	N-325	12.16
There's a rumour going around that the network is bringing in a ratings consultant to rejig the show. Isaac shocks everybody by announcing that not only is the rumour true, it wasn't the network's idea — it was his. He introduces Sam Donovan (William H. Macy) to the staff, but nobody trusts him. Dana decides that Casey, who hasn't been on even one date since the breakup of his marriage to Lisa, should date other people for six months before they begin a relationship with each other. Dan attends a Democratic Party fundraiser, and subsequently tries to track down Hillary Clinton to clarify his comments on education funding after learning that he got two words confused and told her the opposite of what he really meant.
26	3	"Cliff Gardner"	Robert Berlinger	Aaron Sorkin	October 19, 1999	N-327	11.47
Sam Donovan's presence has everyone on edge. Dana considers leaving the show, because she feels like she's being held responsible for the show's problems. A meeting with network executives escalates into a crisis which has the team on the verge of quitting, but Sam deftly defuses the situation.
27	4	"Louise Revisited"	Marc Buckland	T : Aaron Sorkin; S/T : Miriam Kazdin	October 26, 1999	N-326	10.97
Jeremy gets nervous when he discovers that Natalie is writing to his sister Louise. The network sets up a web poll to ask whether Dan or Casey is cooler, and Casey asks Jeremy to help him manipulate the votes. Dana goes out for dinner with an old high school friend, and nobody (not even Dana) can figure out why she took off her underwear in the middle of dinner.
28	5	"Kafelnikov"	Robert Berlinger	Matt Tarses & Bill Wrubel	November 2, 1999	N-328	9.87
Dan meets an attractive woman (Jayne Brook) and learns that she's a psychologist, then becomes obsessed with whether she was interested in dating him or taking him on as a therapy client. Jeremy accidentally blacks out the entire studio while trying to run Y2K tests on the production board.
29	6	"Shane"	Robert Berlinger	Kevin Falls & Matt Tarses & Bill Wrubel	December 7, 1999	N-329	9.29
The Vatican has declared that Hell isn't real, and Natalie struggles to understand why she should bother being a good person if there's no eternal punishment for sin. Casey interviews an old friend, baseball player Shane McArnold, but Dana won't let him clean up the tape to bury Shane's bigoted comments about New York City. After Dan and Jeremy spend over an hour recording and rerecording a ten-second commercial voiceover because Dan can't say Yevgeny Kafelnikov, Dan thinks he may need therapy after all.
30	7	"Kyle Whitaker's Got Two Sacks"	Dennie Gordon	Tom Szentgyörgyi & Aaron Sorkin	December 14, 1999	N-331	11.19
Dana is beaming with pride after her brother Kyle, a professional football player, gets two sacks in a game on Monday Night Football. Dana sends Casey to Ohio to investigate an imminent steroid scandal, not knowing that her brother is one of the players involved. Jeremy is nervous about firing an incompetent employee in the video library who happens to be J.J.'s cousin.
31	8	"The Reunion"	Dennie Gordon	Kevin Falls & Aaron Sorkin	December 21, 1999	N-332	10.03
Kyle is coming to town after his suspension is announced, and Dana's pretty much ready to kill him. Everyone is shopping for their office Secret Santa gifts, and Casey is mystified when Isaac says he wants a cheese grater. With the turn of the millennium just days away, the team is still struggling to decide whom to name as the athlete of the 20th century.
32	9	"A Girl Named Pixley"	Dennie Gordon	David Walpert	December 28, 1999	N-330	10.10
Jeremy is nominated for a sports journalism award that Natalie knows he's not going to win. After fighting Dana's dating plan, Casey finally goes out on a date with a girl named Pixley, and Dana begins to have second thoughts.
33	10	"The Giants Win the Pennant, the Giants Win the Pennant!"	Pamela Dresser	Matt Tarses & Aaron Sorkin	January 11, 2000	N-333	14.01
Dan wants to do a feature report on the Shot Heard 'Round the World, but Isaac refuses to be interviewed for it even though he was at the game. Dan thinks Isaac is embarrassed about his speech having been slowed down since the stroke, but in reality Isaac is embarrassed to admit that he missed the home run because he was in the bathroom. Dana is even more freaked out when Casey goes on a second date with Pixley.
34	11	"The Cut Man Cometh"	Alex Graves	T : Aaron Sorkin; S/T : Bill Wrubel	January 18, 2000	N-334	12.64
Dan's perennially disapproving father (Peter Riegert) is in town for a visit. The team is preparing to cover a heavily hyped boxing match, but must contend with an annoyingly dense on-site reporter who insists on being addressed as "Cut Man". The match ends in less than a minute, because the underdog goes down for the count on the very first punch, and the team has to improvise to fill the whole hour. Dana and Casey argue about the dating plan.
35	12	"The Sweet Smell of Air"	Alex Graves	T : Kevin Falls, Matt Tarses, Aaron Sorkin; S/T : David Handelman	January 25, 2000	N-335	13.27
Sports Night is offered an exclusive interview with Michael Jordan, but the team struggles to accept the strict conditions attached: they can't ask him about sports at all, but only about his new line of cologne. The Michael Jordan interview was only offered to them out of the perception that they would be the only one of the major sports networks desperate enough for the ratings to agree to Jordan's conditions, but Sam tells Isaac and Dana that they are not. Casey is invited to speak to Charlie's class, but can't figure out what to talk about.
36	13	"Dana Get Your Gun"	Alex Graves	David Walpert	February 1, 2000	N-336	12.33
Natalie and Jeremy fight over going to a nightclub. Dan has the night off, but the substitute anchor is morose and keeps making comments on the air to his girlfriend instead of reading the teleprompter. Dana is conflicted after she inherits an antique Revolutionary War gun.
37	14	"And the Crowd Goes Wild"	Alex Graves	T : Aaron Sorkin; S/T : Tom Szentgyörgyi	February 8, 2000	N-337	10.96
Jeremy and Natalie's breakup begins to impact the show after Jeremy asks for his stuff back. Casey is temporarily blinded from an eye test, and Dan takes the opportunity to play practical jokes on him. After a riot breaks out at Madison Square Garden, Natalie objects to the show turning over its film of the event to the police.
38	15	"Celebrities"	Robert Berlinger	Aaron Sorkin	February 29, 2000	N-338	10.90
After being excluded from a staff game night because Natalie was organizing it, Jeremy goes to a bar and befriends Jenny (Paula Marshall), but panics when he realizes that she's a porn actress. Isaac is upset that he can't remember the lyrics to a song from a Broadway show.
39	16	"The Local Weather"	Timothy Busfield	S : Pete McCabe; S/T : Aaron Sorkin	March 7, 2000	N-339	12.28
Dan decides to skip his therapy appointment, but spends the entire length of a normal appointment in his therapist's office explaining why. Jeremy e-mails Jenny to apologize for blowing her off, but then meets up with her in person only to explain why he's not going to see her again. Casey tries to bribe the gang to watch a track and field event with him in the middle of the night.
40	17	"Draft Day: Part I — It Can't Rain at Indian Wells"	Bryan Gordon	Matt Tarses & Aaron Sorkin	March 14, 2000	N-340	11.77
Casey and Dana compete with each other over their NFL draft predictions. Dan has a golf date with PGA star David Duval, but work might keep him from being able to go. Jeremy tells Natalie about Jenny, except for the part about her being a porn star. Casey and Dan are angry with each other and their professional relationship might be in trouble.
41	18	"Draft Day: Part II — The Fall of Ryan O'Brian"	Danny Leiner	S : Kevin Falls; T : Aaron Sorkin	March 21, 2000	N-341	12.70
Jenny is coming to visit the studio, but Jeremy is afraid of what Natalie will think of her. Dan makes Casey look foolish on the air.
42	19	"April is the Cruelest Month"	Don Scardino	Bill Wrubel & Matt Tarses	March 28, 2000	N-342	11.34
Due to network cutbacks, the show's Olympic coverage is going to be limited and Natalie may be about to lose her job. Dan and Jeremy hold a Passover Seder and Dan makes up for his inappropriate on-air behavior toward Casey.
43	20	"Bells and a Siren"	Don Scardino	Chris Lusvardi & David Walpert & Aaron Sorkin	April 4, 2000	N-343	11.78
Natalie gets a job interview with Saturday Night Live, but Dana wants everyone to undermine her confidence so that she won't get the job and leave the Sports Night team. Dan's publicist wants him to make a public appearance in New Jersey. Isaac is upset because his grandson has been scared of him ever since the stroke. Casey and Jeremy decide to investigate CSC's financial situation, but make an unsettling discovery in the process: the network might be up for sale.
44	21	"La Forza del Destino"	Timothy Busfield	Aaron Sorkin	May 9, 2000	N-344	10.39
Everybody begins to plan what they'll do if CSC is sold and they lose their jobs. Dan and Casey debate a job with a television station in Los Angeles. Dana meets a mysterious stranger (Clark Gregg) who seems to be following the CSC bidding war unusually closely; his advice to Dana is to ask her staff, "Where are we going?"
45	22	"Quo Vadimus"	Thomas Schlamme	Aaron Sorkin	May 16, 2000	N-345	11.07
Everyone prepares for the worst as the sale of CSC draws closer. Dan wants to go to Los Angeles, but Casey decides not to. Dan's decision is complicated when Rebecca returns and wants to get back together. An unforeseen bidder, Quo Vadimus, suddenly puts in a new bid for CSC. When Jeremy tells Dana that Quo Vadimus means "Where are we going?", she suddenly realizes that her mysterious new friend is Calvin Trager. She rushes out to find him and he confirms that he has bought CSC and plans to keep Sports Night on the air.

== Additional airings ==
- After its cancellation, the rerun rights to the show were briefly picked up by Comedy Central.
- In 2004, ABC1, a British offshoot of ABC, began broadcasting Season 1 of Sports Night in the United Kingdom for the first time. The second season aired in January 2006.
- It was also aired briefly in Latin America on Sony Entertainment Television. The Spanish version of this channel ran the show in Spain.
- Australia's Channel 7 aired the show on late night television from 1999 to 2001 and was later repeated in the mornings in 2002.
- Australia's Foxtel cable network aired Sports Night on The Comedy Channel in 2005.
- The show was aired in Turkey on DiziMax in 2006.
- The show aired in Italy on Raidue (from 2006 to 2008) and Rai4 (July 2009).
- The show was available on Netflix. The Netflix airings did not retain the entire original soundtrack.
- Reruns of Sports Night aired semi-regularly on FXX from the network's inception in 2013 until 2017.
- All episodes of the show previously were available on Hulu in the US.
- In 2023, the show aired on the FAST channel Maximum Effort.

== Awards ==
- American Cinema Editors (ACE)

1999: Best Edited Half-Hour Series for Television (Janet Ashikaga for "Small Town", nominated)

- Art Directors Guild (ADG)

1998: Excellent Production Design – Television Series (Thomas Azzari, nominated)

- Casting Society of America (CSA)

1998: Best Casting – Comedy Episodic (nominated)
1998: Best Casting – Comedy Pilot (nominated)
1999: Best Casting – Comedy Episodic (nominated)

- Directors Guild of America (DGA)

1998: Outstanding Directorial Achievement – Comedy Series (Thomas Schlamme for "Pilot", won)
1999: Outstanding Directorial Achievement- Comedy Series (Schlamme for "Small Town", nominated)

- Emmy Awards

1999: Outstanding Directing for a Comedy Series (Thomas Schlamme for "Pilot", won)
1999: Outstanding Multi-Camera Picture Editing for a Series (for "Small Town", won)
1999: Outstanding Writing in a Comedy Series (Aaron Sorkin for "The Apology", nominated)
2000: Outstanding Cinematography for a Multi-Camera Series (for "Cut Man", won)
2000: Outstanding Casting for a Comedy Series (nominated)
2000: Outstanding Directing for a Comedy Series (Schlamme for "Quo Vadimus", nominated)
2000: Outstanding Guest Actor in a Comedy Series (William H. Macy for playing "Sam Donovan", nominated)
2000: Outstanding Multi-Camera Picture Editing for a Series (for "The Cut Man Cometh", nominated)

- Golden Globe Awards

1999: Best Actress – Musical or Comedy Series (Felicity Huffman for playing "Dana Whitaker", nominated)

- Humanitas Prize

1999: Television series – 30 minutes. won

- Image Awards

1998: Outstanding Actor – Comedy Series (Robert Guillaume for playing "Isaac Jaffe", nominated)
1999: Outstanding Actor – Comedy Series (Guillaume, nominated)
2000: Outstanding Actor – Comedy Series (Guillaume, nominated)

- Producers Guild of America (PGA)

1999: Television Producer of the Year Award in Episodic (nominated)

- Satellite Awards

2000: Best Actor – Musical or Comedy Series (Robert Guillaume for playing "Isaac Jaffe", nominated)

- Screen Actors Guild (SAG)

1999: Outstanding Cast – Comedy Series (nominated)

- Television Critics Association Awards (TCA)

1999: Program of the Year (nominated)
1999: Outstanding Achievement in Comedy (won)
1999: Outstanding New Program (nominated)
