= Timothy Davis-Reed =

American actor

- Occupations: Television actor, college instructor

Timothy Davis-Reed is an American film, television and theater actor.

== Education ==
Davis-Reed has a Bachelor of Fine Arts degree from Syracuse University and studied acting with Charles Nelson Reilly and Arthur Storch.

== Career ==
As a television actor, he was in all 45 episodes of the comedy Sports Night, 56 episodes of the political drama The West Wing, and 2 episodes of Studio 60 on the Sunset Strip; all shows created by Aaron Sorkin. Davis-Reed also appeared in The West Wing reunion special A West Wing Special to Benefit When We All Vote. Davis-Reed also appeared in a variety of television shows such as The Equalizer, Harry's Law, Monk, Scrubs, and Desperate Housewives.

As a film actor, Davis-Reed appeared in Material Girls, a comedy starring Hilary Duff and Haylie Duff.

On stage, he performed in the New York Shakespeare Festival with Angela Bassett.

Davis-Reed was an instructor at Syracuse University; teaching sections of freshman acting, stage combat, audition, scene study, and film classes and workshops.

== Filmography ==
=== Film ===
Timothy Davis-Reed film credits
Year	Title	Role
1999	The Deep End of the Ocean	Reporter
2006	Material Girls	Security Guard
2017	Pottersville	John Logan

=== Television ===
Timothy Davis-Reed television credits
Year	Title	Role	Notes
1988	The Equalizer	Fencer (uncredited)	Episode: "The Last Campaign"
1998	Babylon 5: In the Beginning	Man 1	TV movie
1998	Star Trek: Voyager	Kyrian Spectator	Episode: "Living Witness"
1998–2000	Sports Night	Chris	45 episodes
2000	Will & Grace	Customs Officer	1 episode
2000–2006	The West Wing	Reporter #2 / Reporter Mark / Mark O'Donnell	52 episodes
2001	Chestnut Hill	Tom Vogel	TV movie (pilot)
2003	Monk	Commentator #1	Episode: "Mr. Monk Goes to the Ballgame" (S2.E3)
2003	7th Heaven	Fabricator #2	1 episode
2003	Still Standing	Bonnie's Dad	1 episode
2004	Arrested Development	Officer Kelley	1 episode
2004	The Drew Carey Show	Father	1 episode
2004	Scrubs	Interviewer	1 episode
2005	Desperate Housewives	Doctor	1 episode
2005	24	George Kliavkoff	Episode: "Day 4: 10:00 a.m.-11:00 a.m." (S4.E4)
2006	Monk	Nephew's Lawyer	Episode: "Mr. Monk and the Leper" (S5.E10)
2007	Studio 60 on the Sunset Strip	Lt. Pierce	2 episodes
2009	Big Love	Loan officer	1 episode
2011	Harry's Law	Dr. Quinn	1 episode
2017	Law & Order True Crime	Paul	4 episodes
2020	A West Wing Special to Benefit When We All Vote	Mark O'Donnell	The West Wing reunion special
