= Thomas Schlamme =

American director

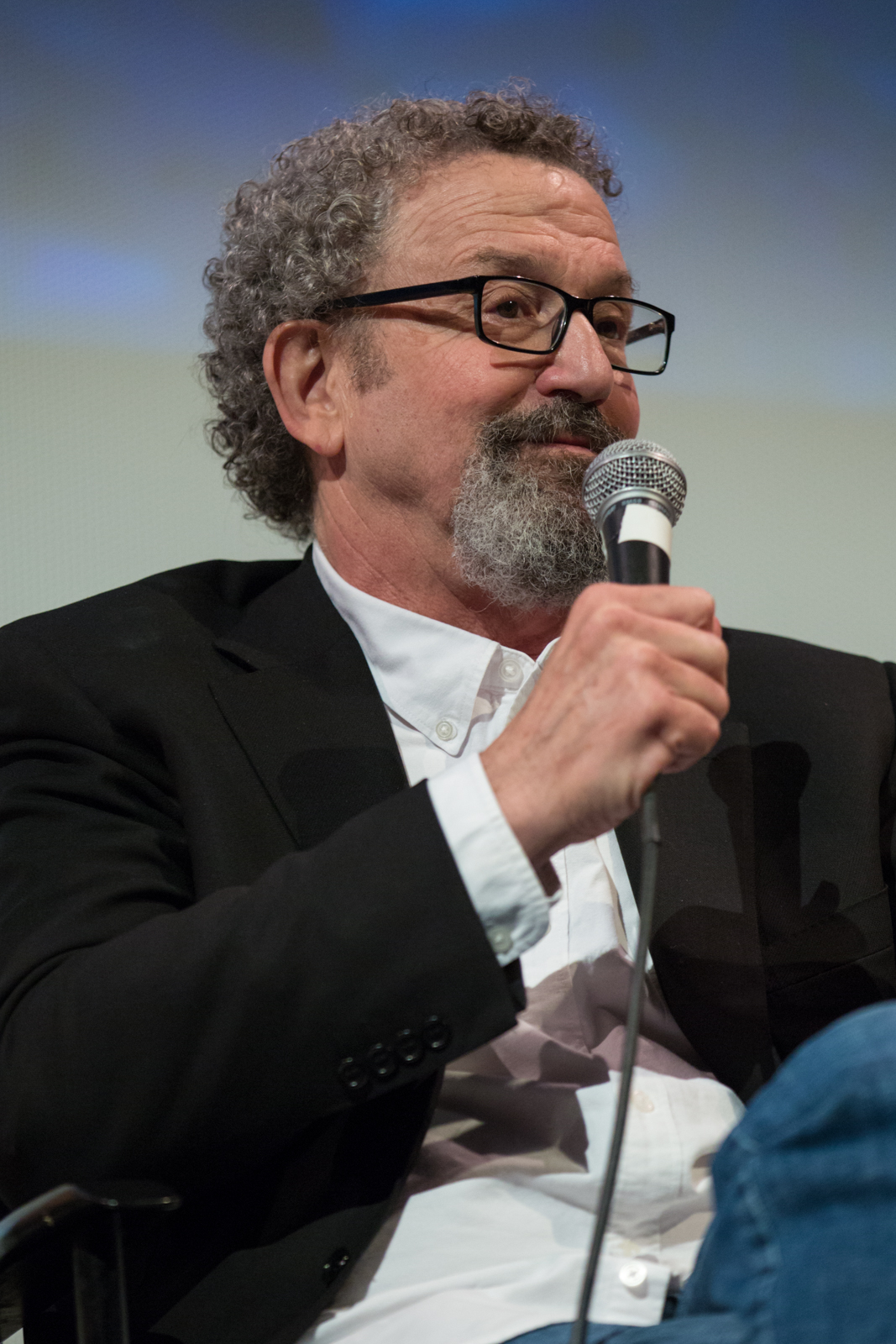
- Schlamme in 2016
- Born: Thomas David Schlamme; May 22, 1950 (age 76); Houston, Texas, U.S.
- Occupations: Director, producer
- Spouse: Christine Lahti (m. 1983)
- Children: 3

Thomas David Schlamme (/ˈʃlɑːmi/; born May 22, 1950) is an American television director, known particularly for his collaborations with Aaron Sorkin. He is known for his work as executive producer on The West Wing and Studio 60 on the Sunset Strip, as well as his work as director on Sports Night and The Americans.

== Early life ==
Schlamme was born in Houston, Texas. He is Jewish, and his family escaped Nazi Germany the week before the Kristallnacht. He attended Bellaire High School in Bellaire, Texas.

== Production ==
Schlamme moved from his native Houston to New York City in 1973. After serving in several low level positions for production companies, he founded his own company, Schlamme Productions, in 1980. From there, he produced campaigns for a number of musicals, including Cats. He directed the first "I Want My MTV!" advertising campaign in 1981 for producer Buzz Potamkin, and singer/songwriter Amy Grant's 1985 music video "Find a Way" for producers Fred Seibert and Alan Goodman. Throughout the 1980s, he produced a number of specials on various entertainers including Whoopi Goldberg and Rowan Atkinson.

Starting in the late 1990s, Schlamme served as producer for shows such as Tracey Takes On... and has directed shows such as Ally McBeal, Boston Public, Friends, ER and, Invasion. He is an executive producer of the American crime drama television series Snowfall which premiered on FX in July 2017. His production company is Shoe Money Productions.

== Director ==
"You almost never see how anyone travels from point A to point C [in most TV shows]. I wanted the audience to witness every journey these people took. It all had a purpose, even seeing them order lunch. It just seemed to be the proper visual rhythm with which to marry Aaron's words. I got lucky that it worked."

— Thomas Schlamme, on the "Walk and Talk" device.

Schlamme made his feature film directing debut with Miss Firecracker in 1989, and later directed the 1993 comedy film So I Married an Axe Murderer, starring Mike Myers. He had previously directed the filming of Spalding Gray's monologue Terrors of Pleasure in 1987. In 1991, Schlamme directed all six episodes of Billy Crystal's HBO comedy miniseries Sessions, starring Michael McKean and Elliott Gould. Schlamme also directed the pilot episodes of Spin City and What's Alan Watching?

He worked on the TV series Parenthood for NBC and Pan Am for ABC. Schlamme has also directed multiple episodes of the 2014 series Manhattan.

In 2017, he was elected president of the Directors Guild of America.

=== Work with Aaron Sorkin ===
Schlamme's nearly decade-long collaboration in television with writer-producer Aaron Sorkin began in early 1998 when they found they shared common creative ground on the soon to be produced Sports Night. Their successful partnership in television was one in which Sorkin focused on writing the scripts while Schlamme executive produced and occasionally directed; they worked together on Sports Night, The West Wing, and Studio 60 on the Sunset Strip. Schlamme would create the look of the shows, work with the other directors, discuss the scripts with Sorkin as soon as they were turned in, make design and casting decisions, and attend the budget meetings; Sorkin tended to stick strictly to writing.

Schlamme first worked with Aaron Sorkin on his short-lived ABC comedy/drama Sports Night, for which he directed 16 of its 45 episodes. Their biggest break was in 1999, teaming up again on their hit political drama The West Wing. He directed the pilot episode and from then on served as the executive producer until 2003. In addition to serving as executive producer, he directed 14 episodes of The West Wing, including the second season finale, "Two Cathedrals", now widely considered one of the greatest tv episodes ever made. In 2003, at the end of the fourth season, Schlamme and Sorkin left the show due to internal conflicts at Warner Bros. TV not involving the NBC network, thrusting producer John Wells into an expanded role as showrunner.

In early October 2005, a pilot script dubbed Studio 7 on the Sunset Strip for a new TV series, written by Sorkin and with Schlamme attached as producer, started circulating around Hollywood and generating interest on the web. A week later, NBC bought from Warner Bros. TV the right to show the TV series on their network for a near-record license fee in a bidding war with CBS. The show's name was later changed to Studio 60 on the Sunset Strip.

In September 2006, the pilot for Studio 60 aired on NBC, directed by Schlamme. The pilot was critically acclaimed and had high ratings, but Studio 60 experienced a significant drop in audience by mid-season. The show was cancelled after one season.

=== "Walk and talk" ===
Schlamme's direction is characterized by use of a technique called the "walk and talk": sequences consisting of single lengthy tracking shots involving multiple characters engaging in conversation as they move through the set. Characters enter and exit the conversation as the shot continues without any cuts.

== Personal life ==
Schlamme resides in Los Angeles with his wife of 40 years, actress and filmmaker Christine Lahti. They have three children. He is the step-brother of attorney Solomon Wisenberg, who was Ken Starr's deputy during the impeachment of Bill Clinton and he questioned the President during the grand jury interview. He is the uncle of producer Dylan K. Massin, who produced 43 episodes of The West Wing, as well as Gilmore Girls: A Year in the Life and other television series.
