= Paramount Television =

Division of American film company, 1966–2006

- Final print logo, used from 2005 to 2006
- Formerly: Paramount Television Corporation (1966–1989)
- Type: Division
- Industry: Television production
- Predecessors: Desilu Productions; CBS Productions (original); Viacom Productions
- Founded: December 15, 1966; 59 years ago
- Defunct: April 24, 2006; 20 years ago
- Fate: Renamed as CBS Paramount Television
- Successors: CBS Studios; Paramount Television Studios (first and second incarnation)
- Headquarters: Los Angeles, California, United States
- Parent: Paramount Pictures (1966–2004); CBS Paramount Network Television Entertainment Group (2004–2005); CBS Corporation (2005–2006)
- Divisions: Paramount International Television (1966–2004); Wilshire Court Productions (1989–2003); Paramount Stations Group (1991–2001)
- Subsidiaries: Paramount Domestic Television (1981–2006); Viacom Productions (1994–2004); Spelling Television (1999–2006); Big Ticket Entertainment (1999–2006); CBS Productions (2004–2006)

The first incarnation of Paramount Television, formerly Paramount Television Corporation, was operated as the television production division of the CBS Paramount Network Television Entertainment Group, which was active from December 15, 1966 until April 24, 2006, when it was renamed as CBS Paramount Television.

== History ==
=== Desilu Productions ===
Desilu Productions was an American production company founded and co-owned by husband and wife Desi Arnaz and Lucille Ball, best known for shows such as I Love Lucy, Star Trek, and The Untouchables. Until 1962, Desilu was the second-largest independent television production company in the United States behind MCA Inc.'s Revue Productions until MCA bought Universal Pictures, and Desilu became and remained the number-one independent production company until it was sold in 1967. Ball and Arnaz jointly owned the majority stake in Desilu from its inception until 1962, when Ball bought out Arnaz and ran the company by herself for several years. Ball had succeeded in making Desilu profitable again by 1967, when she sold her shares of Desilu to Gulf+Western for $17 million ($164 million in 2025 dollars). Gulf+Western then transformed Desilu into the television production arm of Paramount Pictures, rebranding the company as Paramount Television.

==== Paramount's early involvement in television ====
The Paramount Television Network was a venture by American film corporation Paramount Pictures to organize a television network in the late 1940s. The company built television stations KTLA in Los Angeles and WBBM-TV in Chicago; it also invested US$400,000 in the DuMont Television Network, which operated stations WABD (now WNYW) in New York City, WTTG in Washington, D.C., and WDTV (now KDKA-TV) in Pittsburgh. Escalating disputes between Paramount and DuMont concerning breaches of contract, company control, and network competition erupted regularly between 1940 and 1956, and culminated in the dismantling of the DuMont Network. Television historian Timothy White called the clash between the two companies "one of the most unfortunate and dramatic episodes in the early history of the television industry."

The Paramount Television Network aired several programs, including the Emmy Award-winning children's series Time for Beany. Filmed in Hollywood, the programs were distributed to an ad-hoc network of stations across the United States. The network signed network affiliation agreements with more than 50 television stations in 1950; despite this, most of Paramount's series were not widely viewed outside the West Coast. The Federal Communications Commission (FCC), which filed suit against Paramount for anti-trust violations, prevented the studio from acquiring additional television stations. Paramount executives eventually gave up on the idea of a television network, and continued to produce series for other networks.

Paramount Pictures had made one attempt in the mid-1950s to produce a show themself under the Paramount Television banner: Sally starring Joan Caulfield, was a short-lived series on NBC during the 1957–58 season. The spun-off theater chain purchased control of the ABC, and due to legal requirements sold WBKB-TV (now WBBM-TV) to CBS.

Another attempt by Paramount was known as Paramount Pictures Television. One of the series was Destination Space, a pilot to a proposed series that never got off the ground, produced in association with the CBS Television Network in 1959.

Paramount made two more attempts, one Paramount purchased a majority stake in Talent Associates in 1961, which was divested in 1965, and the other when Paramount purchased Plautus Productions in 1963.

==== The 1960s ====
In 1966, Paramount was on the verge of bankruptcy, when the studio was bought out by Gulf+Western. By that point, Paramount had largely distanced itself from television, having stopped production of its early shows, closed down its networks, and sold off the stations it owned. It also sold most of the early half of its sound-era theatrical library (mostly pre-1950 works) to such companies as EMKA, Ltd.—a wholly owned subsidiary of MCA (pre-1950 theatrical live-action sound features; now owned by Universal Television), U.M. & M. TV Corporation (most short subjects released through October 1950; now owned by Paramount Pictures through Melange Pictures), Associated Artists Productions – also called a.a.p. [sic] for short (Popeye the Sailor cartoons; now owned by Warner Bros. through Turner Entertainment Co.), Harvey Films (most short subjects released between October 1950 and March 1962; now also owned by Universal Pictures through DreamWorks Animation and DreamWorks Classics), and National Comics Publications (Superman cartoons; later DC Comics, now also owned by Warner Bros. through DC Entertainment).

==== Formation and Desilu merger ====
On December 15, 1966, CBS president John T. Reynolds left his role and became president of Paramount Pictures' new Paramount Television division. In 1967, Paramount Television Enterprises began distributing Portfolio I, a package of 60 Paramount films for syndication.

Charles Bluhdorn's Gulf+Western bought Desilu in 1967, which was merged into Paramount, who had been Desilu's next door neighbor since the closure of RKO Pictures. The sale resulted in Paramount Television assuming production of Desilu programs in December of that year. The three Desilu lots – the original RKO Studios and two Culver City locations – were included in the sale, but the Justice Department forced Bluhdorn to sell the Culver Studios to avoid a monopoly. The old RKO globe is still in place at the corner of Gower and Melrose in the Paramount lot.

The first PTV production to premiere after the re-incorporation was Here's Lucy. Paramount only produced the first season however, selling their stake in the show to Ball after the season finale. Throughout that, Paramount started good relations with ABC, allowing it to produce several shows in the 1960s and the 1970s, with The Brady Bunch and The Odd Couple becoming the biggest hits for the studio.

In 1971, Douglas S. Cramer, who served as vice president in charge of production at the studio had left, to start out his production company affiliated with Columbia Pictures and Screen Gems. In 1972, Thomas Miller, who was vice president of program development and Edward Milkis, who served in charge of post-production would leave the studio to start their own production company Miller/Milkis Productions with a development deal at the studio. Happy Days would go on to be a hit for both the studio and Miller/Milkis, with subsequent spin-offs that were served to launch a franchise. In 1977, Gary Nardino then become president of the studio.

Gulf+Western had plans to launch a television network in the late 1970s, the Paramount Television Service, with a new Star Trek series as the cornerstone of the network. But these plans were scrapped, and Star Trek: Phase II was reworked into Star Trek: The Motion Picture.

In 1979, Terry Keegan, Paramount employee, joined with former QM Productions production executive Arthur Fellows to launch a Paramount-affiliated production company The Fellows/Keegan Company, who was worked until 1983, when it went alternative deals with the company. In 1983, Gary Nardino had left the company to start out a company affiliated with Paramount, Gary Nardino Productions, of which they stayed for six years until 1989.

In 1984, former MGM producer Leonard Goldberg joined Paramount to serve as production agreement with the studio via Mandy Films. In 1986, Eddie Murphy, who had success with starring films for Paramount's own movie studio, launched Eddie Murphy Television Enterprises with a deal at Paramount Television for their own projects. In 1988, Murphy signed a contract with CBS to develop their own television projects in collaboration with Paramount.

In late 1988, Paramount Television formed its subsidiary Wilshire Court Productions, to supply television movies for the USA Network, which was led by John J. McMahon, and one of the network's primary suppliers of television movies, along with MCA-owned MCA Television Entertainment.

=== Ownership changes and library expansion ===
In 1989, Gulf+Western was re-incorporated as Paramount Communications, named after the company's prime asset, Paramount Pictures (the name of which was also used for the company as a whole). That firm was sold to Viacom in 1994. In 1990, Paramount had signed Arsenio Hall to a multi-year exclusive production contract for film and television projects, and let his talk show to be renewed through 1994.

In 1992, Paramount had struck a deal with various talent writers and producers. The talent were Don Johnson, Kathy Speer and Terry Grossman, Barry Fanaro and Mort Nathan, Danny Bilson and Paul De Meo, Tim O'Donnell, Janet Leahy, John Mankiewicz, Christopher Crowe and Jacob Epstein and Ken Solarz. Also that year, Donald P. Bellisario had left Universal Television after 12 years to sign with Paramount Television.

The Viacom merger gave Paramount a larger television library as well, since Viacom had television production and distribution units as well prior to the Paramount acquisition. The distribution company, Viacom Enterprises (which syndicated the classic CBS library among other shows), was merged into Paramount Domestic Television while the production company, Viacom Productions (known at the time for its co-productions with Fred Silverman and Dean Hargrove), continued as a division of Paramount Television until 2004. Prior to the 1994 merger, Viacom Productions teamed up with Paramount Network Television where Paramount took a stake in the Fox sitcom Flying Blind.

The first major hit from Viacom Productions to debut after becoming a division of Paramount Television was Sabrina the Teenage Witch, based on the Archie Comics of the same name. Starring Melissa Joan Hart as the title character, the series lasted four seasons on ABC (in contrast to the lack of success from the parent company on the network in this period) and three on The WB between 1996 and 2003.

In 1995, Paramount struck a program deal with Procter & Gamble for a three-year period. It also expanded with a first-look partnership with NBC to obtain their projects created by the partnership that year. Also that year, it entered into a partnership with the Fox Broadcasting Company to launch a joint partnership with Television Production Partners to help them advertise their projects, and also include support from Fox's production partners.

In 1994, the Paramount Television Group and MTV Productions signed a deal to develop projects commissioned by MTV, and gave Paramount the right of first refusal on projects developed by MTV. For the 1997-98 season Paramount Network Television collaborated with Viacom sister MTV Productions, to produce the NBC comedy Jenny, the UPN (then-sister of MTV) comedy Hitz, and the WB drama Three, but none of them got success beyond its first season.

In 1996, producer Barry Kemp had signed a multi-year overall deal with Paramount to produce their projects under the Bungalow 78 Productions banner, and had plans for a series with a 13-episode commitment for CBS. Paramount then turned around, along with Kemp, with part ways, to turn the project over to Warner Bros. Television with new showrunners Ed Decter and John J. Strauss on the board.

Paramount continued to build its television library. In 1999, Viacom acquired full interest in Spelling Entertainment Group (which included Spelling Television, Big Ticket Entertainment, Worldvision Enterprises, and Republic Pictures, among other companies), and the rights to Rysher Entertainment's television holdings. Also in 1999, Steven Bochco, being lured from CBS was recruited by Paramount Television for a production/distribution agreement. In 2003, Big Ticket was absorbed into Paramount, but Big Ticket continued to be used as an in-name only unit. In late 2005, Spelling Television has laid off its employees, transitioning from a separate studio to a pod development deal within the studio.

=== Launch of UPN and co-ownership with CBS ===
In January 1995, Paramount finally launched a television network, the United Paramount Network, or UPN for short, which later merged with Time Warner's The WB in 2006 to form The CW. Paramount Television produced the bulk of the series airing on UPN, including the first program ever shown on the network, Star Trek: Voyager. UPN became 100% owned by Viacom in 2000 after Chris-Craft sold its share (its television stations were sold to News Corporation). Along with Star Trek: Voyager, the most successful Paramount Television shows on UPN were One on One, Star Trek: Enterprise and Girlfriends.

In 2000, Viacom acquired its founding parent CBS, which had actually spun off Viacom in 1971. Paramount Television began producing more shows airing on CBS (it already produced JAG, a former NBC production, Becker starring Cheers veteran Ted Danson, and Nash Bridges, having acquired the latter from Rysher Entertainment). Most of the new Paramount Television series that debuted on CBS after the merger were not very successful, including Bram & Alice and Out of Practice (starring Happy Days veteran Henry Winkler). However, four of these series would become hits: JAG spin-off NCIS, Numb3rs, Criminal Minds, and Ghost Whisperer (the latter two were co-productions with Touchstone Television, which later became ABC Studios). All four of these series would continue under CBS Paramount Television and later CBS Television Studios, with only NCIS and Criminal Minds still airing (both also had spin-offs of their own—NCIS: Los Angeles and Criminal Minds: Suspect Behavior—with varied success).

In 2004, it was merged with CBS Productions to form a new entity of Paramount Network Television, which produced all new shows for CBS. CBS Productions was rendered defunct in September 2004 by folding it up into Paramount Network Television, though the CBS Productions logo continued to be used on older co-productions airing on the CBS television network until 2006, becoming an in-name only unit of the studio. Also in 2004, Viacom Productions was absorbed into Paramount Network Television. Perry Simon, who was the president of Viacom Productions set up its new company, Shore View Entertainment, at the studio.

In 2001, Warren Littlefield moved his Littlefield Company from NBC Studios to Paramount Television. Ed Redlich was struck to a deal with Paramount Network Television in 2005.

=== Acquisition by CBS ===
At the end of 2005, Viacom split into two companies, one of which was called CBS Corporation, the other retaining the Viacom name. Despite Paramount Pictures being owned by the new Viacom, CBS Corporation inherited Paramount Television, as well as the right to retain the Paramount name. On January 16, 2006, the new incarnation of Paramount Television was renamed CBS Paramount Television. Paramount's final series was Courting Alex (co-produced with Touchstone Television) for CBS. Programs produced by Paramount Television before and after the split are distributed on home media by Paramount Home Entertainment (pre-2005 Paramount programs are released through CBS Home Entertainment due to CBS Studios owning the pre-2005 Paramount television library).

The company survived as CBS Paramount Television for three years. However, CBS began phasing out the Paramount name as early as 2007, when the American distribution arm was merged with King World Productions (bought by CBS just prior to the 2000 Viacom merger) to form CBS Television Distribution. The international arm of PTV was merged with CBS Broadcast International in 2004 (one year before the CBS/Viacom split) to form CBS Paramount International Television.

In 2009, CBS quietly announced that the Paramount name would be stripped from: the main company (CBS Paramount Television), its production arm (CBS Paramount Network Television), and its international arm, with the latter two being renamed CBS Television Studios and CBS Studios International, respectively. With these transactions, Paramount's involvement in television – at least in name only since 2005 – came to an end after 70 years (when the experimental television stations that later became KTLA and WBBM were founded). Paramount had been the first major Hollywood studio to be involved in television. When CBS Paramount Television was renamed CBS Television Studios, Paramount Pictures joined forces with Trifecta Entertainment & Media in distributing the Paramount and Republic film libraries on television.

== See also ==
- Paramount Television Studios – the TV division of the Paramount Television Group since 2013.
