= The Closer (1998 TV series) =

- Also known as: Selleck
- Genre: Sitcom
- Created by: Ed Decter; John J. Strauss
- Starring: Tom Selleck; David Krumholtz; Hedy Burress; Ed Asner; Suzy Nakamura; Penelope Ann Miller
- Composer: Ed Alton
- Country of origin: United States
- Original language: English
- No. of seasons: 1
- No. of episodes: 10

Production
- Camera setup: Multi-camera
- Running time: 30 minutes
- Production companies: T.W.S. II Productions; Frontier Pictures; CBS Productions; Warner Bros. Television

Original release
- Network: CBS
- Release: February 23 – May 4, 1998

The Closer is an American sitcom television series that aired on CBS for 10 episodes from February 23 to May 4, 1998. The show starred Tom Selleck as a successful advertising agency executive.

== Plot ==
Jack McLaren (Tom Selleck), a successful advertising executive, starts his own agency. The business, the employees in the agency, and his personal life provide the story lines. The characters include a creative director, Carl Dobson (Ed Asner), an accountant, Erica Hewitt (Penelope Ann Miller), and a bored secretary, Beverly (Suzy Nakamura); McLaren's estranged and eventually divorced wife, Claire McLaren (Joanna Kerns), and daughter Alex (Hedy Burress).

== Cast ==
- Tom Selleck as Jack McLaren
- Hedy Burress as Alex McLaren
- Ed Asner as Carl "Dobbs" Dobson
- David Krumholtz as Bruno Verma
- Suzy Nakamura as Beverly Andolini
- Penelope Ann Miller as Erica Hewitt

== Production ==
The project was originally started at Paramount Television with Barry Kemp at the helm. Eventually, it moved to Warner Bros., and recruited Ed Decter and John J. Strauss as the new writing/producing/showrunning team.

=== Director and writers ===
The director for the series was Andrew D. Weyman. It had the following writers:

- Tom Burkhard
- Howard Busgang
- Ed Decter
- David Kidd
- Laura Perkins-Brittain
- Ron Burch

=== Producers ===
- Howard Busgang
- Ed Decter
- Penny Segal
- Tom Selleck
- John J. Strauss
- Craig Wyrick-Solari

== Episodes ==
No.	Title	Directed by	Written by	Original release date	Prod. code	Viewers (millions)
1	"Pilot"	Andrew D. Weyman	Ed Decter & John J. Strauss	February 23, 1998	475131	15.74
2	"Morality Bites"	Unknown	Unknown	March 2, 1998	467101	13.56
3	"Dobbs Takes a Holiday"	Unknown	Unknown	March 9, 1998	467102	11.31
4	"The Closure"	Shelley Jensen	Tad Quill	March 16, 1998	467104	9.96
5	"The Rebound"	Unknown	Unknown	March 30, 1998	467105	10.79
6	"Baby, It's Cold Outside"	Unknown	Unknown	April 6, 1998	467106	10.06
An old flame, actress Victoria, visits and she and Jack start to rekindle their romance – Victoria and Jack sing and dance in a fantasy musical sequence.
7	"Honor Thy Jack"	Will Mackenzie	Howard Busgang & Mark Blutman	April 13, 1998	467107	8.42
8	"Deep Game"	Gil Junger	Ron Burch & David Kidd	April 20, 1998	467103	8.81
9	"The Hand That Rocks the Office"	Shelley Jensen	Story by : Rita Mimoun; Teleplay by : Ethan Banville & Shari Brooks	April 27, 1998	467108	8.50
10	"My Best Friend's Funeral"	Alan Rafkin	Bill Wolkoff	May 4, 1998	467109	7.66

== Awards and nominations ==
- Emmy Award — Outstanding Music and Lyrics (for the song "You Don't Know Jack") (nominated)
