= My Suicidal Sweetheart =

- Directed by: Michael Parness
- Written by: Michael Parness
- Produced by: Michael Parness; Elana Pianko; Gene Raphael Miller; Ron Brown; G. Mac Brown
- Starring: Natasha Lyonne; David Krumholtz; Tim Blake Nelson; Lorraine Bracco; Rosanna Arquette; David Paymer
- Cinematography: Horacio Marquínez
- Edited by: Mark Livolsi
- Music by: Michael Andrews
- Distributed by: Full Glass Films
- Release date: March 2005 (South by Southwest)
- Running time: 115 minutes
- Country: United States
- Language: English

My Suicidal Sweetheart is a 2005 American independent dark comedy film written and produced by Michael Parness. The initial working title of the film was Saving Grace; this title was later changed to Max & Grace during production, and remained in place prior to its release on the film festival circuit in March 2005.

During an appearance at the 2006 Sacramento Film Festival, Parness remarked that he was dissatisfied with the title of Max & Grace and announced plans to change it to My Suicidal Sweetheart. The film has been released on DVD under the title Crazy for Love.

== Background ==
According to Filmmaker Magazine, "Michael Parness was on his fourth career when he stepped behind the camera to direct the comedy 'Max and Grace' in New York ... Originally the proprietor of a thriving sports memorabilia business that supported his efforts as a playwright, theater director and screenwriter, he lost most of his savings in the October '98 stock market crash. Down to $33,000, he opened an online brokerage account and in 15 months turned it into $7 million; Parness launched financial guru site trendfund.com along the way and recounts his experiences in the 2002 bestseller, Rule the Freakin' Markets. All that made him famous in financial circles and a regular in their media. Dustin Hoffman's Punch Productions even optioned his life story. But he still wanted to make a movie. 'It's what I've wanted to do my whole life,' says Parness. 'Film allows you to take to the next level what you can do on the stage, like showing a character's inner thoughts or using special effects to highlight emotion.'"

In an interview with efilmcritic.com, Parness explained how the movie came to be:

"I was busy teaching people how to Rule the Freakin' Markets trading stocks and I got an email from someone who had seen one of my plays years earlier and wanted to produce something in L.A. Being the control freak I am, I reluctantly let him do so and in the process he asked if I had any screenplays. Max and Grace (then Saving Grace) was lying around and he loved it and his company loved it and they said they would put up money to make it. They ended up, like many, being full of BS, and the money fell through, but I decided I might as well go bankrupt to make it anyway, which is virtually what happened. Like many of my other writings, this was based on a broken relationship where I was always trying to 'save' the woman I was with. Needless to say, I couldn't save her, but I did get a movie out of it!"

== Plot ==
From the moment he was six, Max wanted to die. He tried shooting himself, hanging himself and even throwing himself out of a window. But somehow, he always managed to survive. Exasperated, his parents have him committed to a mental institution, where miraculously he's found something worth living for. Her name is Grace; she's a wild mental patient whose death wish is even stronger than Max's. But Max has a plan to save her. They're taking their marriage vows, 'til death do us part, and escaping the loony bin for the adventure of a new start. Max thinks Grace will be cured by visiting her mother, but he has to keep her alive until they get there. She tries overdosing on pills, running in front of a truck and jumping from a bridge, but luckily each time, Max comes to her rescue. Finally, he brings Grace to her mother and in a bizarre turn of events, the terminally ill oddball orders them to dig her grave. Mom says her goodbyes, but not before she tells Max and Grace that they both have something to live for — she sees a vision of their baby girl in Grace's tummy. It's more than the hope Grace and Max have been searching for; it's the wonderful beginning of a whole new life.

== Cast ==
- Natasha Lyonne as Grace
- David Krumholtz as Max
- Tim Blake Nelson as Doctor, Chief Nakahoma, Minister, Roger Bob
- Lorraine Bracco as Sheila
- David Paymer as Max, Sr.
- Rosanna Arquette as Vera
- Karen Black as Grace's Mom
- Ralf Möller as Bruno
- Guillermo Díaz as Hector
- Dave Attell as Efram the driver
- Emma Adele Galvin as Sis
- James Apaumut Fall as Interpreter
- Dov Davidoff as Doorman
- Michael Parness (film director) as Peter Brown
- Dena Ferreira as Wife
- Tom Shillue as Orderly

== Production ==
The main cast for My Suicidal Sweetheart was set in July 2002. After reading the script, Tim Blake Nelson convinced the producers to let him assume several different roles—as a psychiatric doctor, Chief Nakahoma, a wrestling minister, and as a motivational speaker named Roger Bob. Director Michael Parness popped into a small role as a character named Peter Brown, a participant at Roger Bob's outdoor support group.

Natasha Lyonne was the director's first choice for the role of Grace, and as soon as she signed on, agents began calling and roughly 25 male leads auditioned for the role of Max. The producers at the time wanted a well-known actor for the part, so they cast Edward Furlong in June 2002; unfortunately, due to personal issues and alleged drug and/or alcohol abuse, Furlong was cut from Max & Grace and another film called Firecracker and had to be replaced on both projects. At Lyonne's prompting, Parness then cast actor David Krumholtz as Max in March 2003. Lyonne and Krumholtz first worked together in the 1998 20th Century Fox film The Slums of Beverly Hills, in which they played Vivian and Ben Abromowitz (brother and sister).

== Post-production ==
According to a press release dated March 12, 2005, REX Media was responsible for the website (www.maxandgrace.com), poster and promotional pieces for Max & Grace. This was the company's first time handling a motion picture project.

== Film festival showings ==
The film was first shown at the South by Southwest (SXSW) Film Festival in Austin, Texas. It was screened on Saturday, March 12 and Tuesday, March 25, 2005 at 1:30 p.m. at the Paramount Theatre, and also on Thursday, March 17, 2005 at 7 p.m. at the Alamo Downtown. Other festival appearances for the film included:

- Newport Beach International Film Festival (Newport Beach, CA, USA; April 23, 2005)
- Seattle International Film Festival (Seattle, WA, USA; June 9, 2005)
- Rhode Island Film Festival (Providence, RI, USA; August 13, 2005)
- Rebelfest Film Festival (Toronto, Canada; September 7, 2005)
- San Diego Film Festival (San Diego, CA, USA; September 23, 2005)
- Sidewalk Moving Picture Festival (Birmingham, AL, USA; September 24, 2005)
- California Independent Film Festival (Livermore, CA, USA; October 30, 2005)
- Nolita Film Festival (New York, NY, USA; December 4, 2005)
- DC Independent Film Festival (Washington, D.C., USA; March 4, 2006)
- Tiburon Film Festival (Tiburon, CA; USA; March 11 & 16, 2006)
- Magnolia Film Festival (West Point, MS, USA; March 16, 2006)
- Sacramento Film Festival (Sacramento, CA, USA; April 1, 2006)
- Sarasota Film Festival (Sarasota, FL, USA; April 14, 2006)
- Oxford International Film Festival (Oxford, UK; May 12, 2006)
- Trenton Film Festival (Trenton, NJ, USA; May 15, 2006)
- Big Island Film Festival (Waikoloa, HI, USA; May 18, 2006)

== Awards and achievements ==
- The Newport Beach International Film Festival]- Outstanding Achievement in Filmmaking: Acting (David Krumholtz)
- Rhode Island Film Festival - Best Feature Film (tie)
- California Independent Film Festival - two "Slate" Awards: Best Actor (David Krumholtz, Best Score
- Magnolia Film Festival - Best Film
- Trenton Film Festival - Best Film, Best Actress (Natasha Lyonne), Best Supporting Actor

== Title change ==
Director Michael Parness announced the change in the title of his film from Max & Grace to My Suicidal Sweetheart at a question-and-answer session following the film's screening at the Sacramento Film Festival in March 2006. In June 2007, FilmMates Entertainment, a Los Angeles-based film acquisition, finance, production and distribution company, acquired worldwide theater, television and home video distribution rights to the film. Changes to the title subsequently resulted in changes to the film's poster in 2006, and the trailer carried by the Full Glass Films website.

Initially, the film was set for limited release during Fall 2006 for three major cities: Toronto, New York and Los Angeles. This was to be followed by a home video release, but the limited-release runs never took place. The film has been released as Crazy for Love on home release.
