= Silman =

Silman is a surname. Notable people with the surname include:

- Benny Silman (active 1998), jailed for masterminding a point shaving scandal at Arizona State University
- David Silman (born 1959), English footballer
- Idit Silman (born 1980), Israeli politician
- Jeremy Silman (1954–2023), American chess player and writer
- Moshe Silman (1954–2012), Israeli activist who set himself on fire and died as a result
