= Barry Kemp (TV producer) =

American television producer

- Born: December 4, 1949 (age 75); Hannibal, Missouri, U.S.
- Occupation(s): Producer, director, writer

Barry Kemp (born December 4, 1949) is an American television producer, director and writer, and film producer.

Kemp is best known for creating two television sitcoms: Newhart (he wrote the oft-repeated line: "Hi, I'm Larry. This is my brother Darryl, and this is my other brother Darryl"), which lasted for eight seasons on CBS (1982–1990); and Coach, which lasted for nine seasons on ABC (1989–1997). He also wrote for Taxi for four seasons, and was the creator of Fresno and Delta. Kemp's movie productions include Romy and Michele's High School Reunion, Patch Adams and Catch Me If You Can.

Kemp is a 1971 graduate of the University of Iowa Department of Theatre Arts. Before he became a full-time writer, he was an executive with the chamber of commerce in Phoenix.

He originally planned to do The Closer for CBS at Paramount Television through Bungalow 78 Productions, but eventually moved to Warner Bros. Television with the new showrunners Ed Decter and John J. Strauss.

== Recognition ==
Kemp's productions received three nominations for Emmy Awards: Taxi for Outstanding Writing in a Comedy Series (1982) and Newhart for Outstanding Comedy Series (1984 and 1985). In 1999, he received the Valentine Davies Award from the Writers Guild of America, West.
