= Chicago Sons =

1997 American TV series

- Genre: Sitcom
- Created by: Ed Decter; John J. Strauss
- Starring: Jason Bateman; D.W. Moffett; David Krumholtz; Paula Marshall
- Composer: Donald Markowitz
- Country of origin: United States
- Original language: English
- No. of seasons: 1
- No. of episodes: 13

Production
- Executive producers: Ed Decter; John J. Strauss
- Camera setup: Multi-camera
- Running time: 30 minutes
- Production companies: Frontier Pictures; 3 Sisters Entertainment; Warner Bros. Television

Original release
- Network: NBC
- Release: January 8 – July 2, 1997

Chicago Sons is an American sitcom television series created by Ed Decter and John J. Strauss, that aired on NBC from January 8 until July 2, 1997.

== Premise ==
Three brothers move into an apartment overlooking Wrigley Field.

== Cast ==
- Jason Bateman as Harry Kulchak
- D.W. Moffett as Mike Kulchak
- David Krumholtz as Billy Kulchak
- Paula Marshall as Lindsay Sutton

== Episodes ==
No.	Title	Directed by	Written by	Original release date	Prod. code
1	"Pilot"	James Burrows	Ed Decter and John J. Strauss	January 8, 1997	465592
A recently separated construction worker moves into an apartment with his two younger brothers.
2	"A Foursome is Not Necessarily a Good Thing"	James Burrows	Laura Perkins Brittain	January 15, 1997	465552
Mike finds out that his estranged wife has been seeing another man.
3	"Butkus, Live!"	Michael Lembeck	J.J. Paulsen	January 22, 1997	465558
Harry feels left out when Mike talks to Lindsay about a private matter. Dick Butkus guest stars.
4	"To Have and to Hold"	Gil Junger	Nancy Neufeld Callaway	January 29, 1997	465556
Harry has a proposition for Lindsay.
5	"The Things We Do for Love"	Alan Rafkin	Don Rhymer	February 5, 1997	465560
Mike tries a new approach to dating. Harry tries to woo a surgeon.
6	"Infrequent Flyers"	Steve Zuckerman	Tad Quill	February 12, 1997	465562
Mike invites his brothers and Lindsay to Bahamas. Scottie Pippen guest stars.
7	"Love in the Time of Cicadas"	Gil Junger	Eric Weinberg	February 19, 1997	465559
Mike has a meeting with his estranged wife. Harry and Lindsay has a close encounter. Gabrielle Reece guest stars.
8	"The Belligerent Waitress and the Surly Fry Cook"	Gil Junger	Tom Burkhard	March 5, 1997	465557
Harry accidentally mails a compromising videotape to a pastor.
9	"Kolchak Swings... And Kiss that One Goodbye"	James Burrows	Kim Friese	March 12, 1997	465551
Harry and Lindsay try not to mix pleasure and business. Billy tries to make some quick cash.
10	"Running Interference"	Steve Zuckerman	Michael Poryes	March 19, 1997	465561
Harry and Mike meddle in Billy's love life.
11	"Beauty and the Butt"	Gil Junger	Mark LaVine and Eddie Ring	June 18, 1997	465555
A sculptor prefers Billy instead of Mike.
12	"It's a Mezzner"	Michael Lembeck	Tom Burkhard	June 25, 1997	465553
Billy comes up with a business idea involving an industrial sewing machine.
13	"Mothers, Lost Fullbacks and Other Soft Things"	Rod Daniel	Kim Friese	July 2, 1997	465554
Lindsay fears that her mother will steal the spotlight at a dinner for an architecture award.
