= Steve Williams (animator) =

Canadian special effects artist (born 1963)

- Born: Steven Williams; 1963 (age 62–63); Toronto, Ontario, Canada
- Other name: Spaz Williams
- Occupations: Visual effects artist; animator; director
- Years active: 1988–present
- Father: John Reesor Williams
- Relatives: Harland Williams (brother); Kevin Hearn (cousin)

Steven "Spaz" Williams (born 1963) is a Canadian special effects artist, animator and film and commercials director.

== Biography ==
Williams studied animation at Sheridan College, graduating in 1984. During the summers he would work at the Ontario Institute for Studies in Education Computer Laboratory, learning more about computer animation. After graduation, he went on to work at Alias Research (currently a part of Autodesk) in Toronto. He acted as the company's spokesperson, leading to a job at Industrial Light & Magic in 1988. ILM had purchased Silicon Graphics computers to create the computer-generated effects in The Abyss, and said workstations used Alias modeling software. Along with animators Mark A.Z. Dippé, Scott E. Anderson and Jay Riddle, Williams helped develop a photorealistic alien pseudopod made out of seawater, which later earned the film an Academy Award for Best Visual Effects. Continuing at ILM, Williams worked in two more breakthrough moments of CG effects that earned the company more Oscars: the T-1000 from Terminator 2: Judgment Day (1991), a liquid metal robot that evolved from the work done in The Abyss; and the dinosaurs of Jurassic Park (1993), one of which was the Tyrannosaurus which Williams personally built.

As the chief computer graphics animator of The Mask, Williams shared a nomination for Best Visual Effects (along with Tom Bertino, Jon Farhat and Scott Squires) at the 67th Academy Awards. Williams left ILM along with Dippé following their work in Spawn (1997), which Dippé directed with Williams being the effects supervisor and second unit director. Along with a job at New Line Productions, Williams opened Hoytyboy Productions in San Francisco. Hoytyboy's biggest work was 2006's The Wild for Walt Disney Pictures, which Williams directed. He also directed more than 200 commercials between 1997 and 2010, for clients including Capital One, Toyota, AT&T, Lexus and McDonald's.

As of 2012, Williams continues directing commercials.

In 2022, a feature-length documentary on the life of Williams, Jurassic Punk (also known as Spaz), debuted at the South by Southwest Film Festival.

== Selected filmography ==
- The Abyss (1989)
- The Hunt for Red October (1990)
- Terminator 2: Judgment Day (1991)
- Jurassic Park (1993)
- The Mask (1994)
- Jumanji (1995)
- Eraser (1996)
- Spawn (1997)
- The Wild (2006)
