= Jessica Cauffiel =

American actress and singer

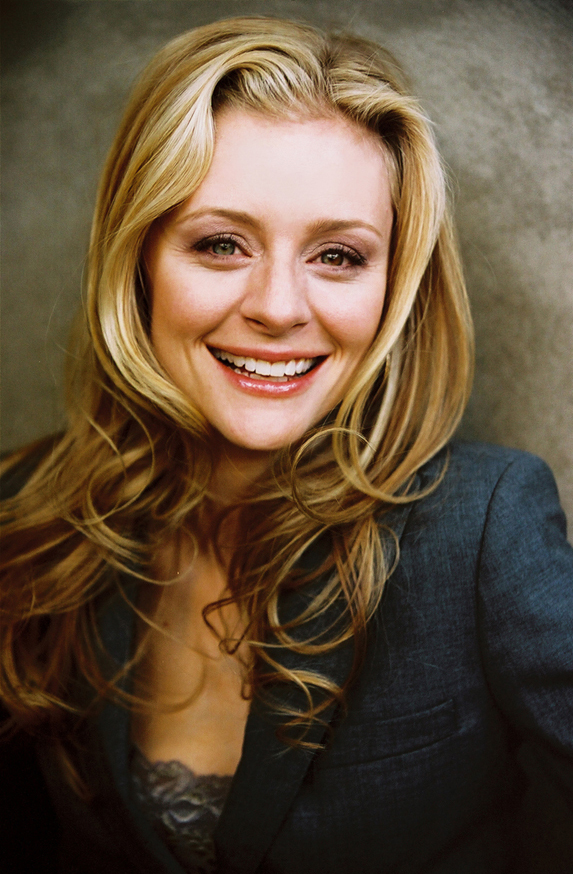
- Cauffiel in February 2009
- Occupations: Actress; singer
- Years active: 1998–2010; 2021–present
- Children: 1

Jessica Cauffiel is an American actress and singer. She played Margot in Legally Blonde (2001) and Legally Blonde 2: Red, White & Blonde (2003) and Tori in White Chicks (2004) and had roles in the films Urban Legends: Final Cut (2000), Valentine (2001) and The World's Fastest Indian (2005).

== Career ==
=== Acting ===
Cauffiel began her career in New York, where she appeared in various Off-Broadway and regional theater productions. Her credits include 1001 Nights, City of Angels, Antigone, Assassins, Cowboy Mouth, Cabaret, A Midsummer Night's Dream, Company, Baby, Music Man, Shoppers Carried by Escalators, and Grand Hotel.

Cauffiel made her film debut in the 1999 remake of The Out-of-Towners and her television debut on Law & Order. That same year, she appeared as Kit on the sitcom Frasier. In 2000, she starred in the comedy Road Trip and Urban Legends: Final Cut. She played a lead role in the 2001 film Valentine. The same year, she was featured in Maxim magazine and its online Girls of Maxim gallery. She co-starred in the independent romantic comedy You Stupid Man. Cauffiel later appeared in Legally Blonde, Legally Blonde 2: Red, White & Blonde, and the 2004 comedy White Chicks.

She appeared in featured roles in Stuck on You and Guess Who. In 2005, she co-starred in the Burt Munro biopic The World's Fastest Indian. She then had a supporting role in the 2006 film adaptation of Carl Hiaasen's novel Hoot, playing both a young actress and the elderly pancake maker Mother Paula. From 2006 to 2007, she had a recurring role on the NBC series My Name Is Earl.

Following a nearly two-year break from acting, Cauffiel was cast as Amy Clayton, a former Olympic figure skater who agrees to coach a teenage girl, in the Hallmark Channel television film Ice Dreams. In 2009, Cauffiel produced and starred in the comedic film short Bed Ridden. The film was written and produced by her father, with proceeds from the film donated to The Clare Foundation to support drug and alcohol recovery programs.

=== Music ===
Cauffiel performed live in Dharamshala, India, and contributed to the album Shanti by Snatam Kaur and Grateful Ganesh by Guruganesh Singh Khalsa.

== Filmography ==
=== Film ===
Year	Title	Role	Notes
1999	The Out-of-Towners	Susan Clark	
2000	Road Trip	Wrong Tiffany	
2000	Urban Legends: Final Cut	Sandra Petruzzi	
2001	Valentine	Lily Voight	
2001	Legally Blonde	Margot Chapman	
2002	You Stupid Man	Diane	
2003	Legally Blonde 2: Red, White & Blonde	Margot Chapman	
2003	Stuck on You	Debbie	
2004	D.E.B.S.	Ninotchka	
2004	White Chicks	Tori Wilson	
2005	Guess Who	Polly	
2005	The World's Fastest Indian	Wendy	
2006	Hoot	Kimberly	
2009	Bed Ridden	Kai	Short film; also co-producer
2011	The Original Mind	N/A	Documentary; producer
2018	Master	N/A	Documentary; writer/producer
TBA	Legally Blonde 3	Margot	Pre-production

=== Television ===
Year	Title	Role	Notes
1998	Law & Order	Cashier	Episode: "Bait"
1999	Frasier	Kit	Episodes: "Shutout in Seattle: Part 1", "Shutout in Seattle: Part 2"
2002–2003	The Drew Carey Show	Milan	Recurring role, 6 episodes
2005	Cuts	Missy Drubman	Episode: "Keeping It Real"
2006–2007	My Name Is Earl	Tatiana	Episodes: "O Karma, Where Art Thou?", "Very Bad Things", "Buried Treasure"
2009	Ice Dreams	Amy Clayton	Hallmark Channel television film
