= Me and the Boys (TV series) =

American sitcom

- Genre: Sitcom
- Created by: Rob Dames; Bob Myer; Leonard Ripps
- Starring: Steve Harvey; Chaz Lamar Shepherd; Wayne Collins Jr. Benjamin LeVert; Madge Sinclair
- Composer: Donald Markowitz
- Country of origin: United States
- Original language: English
- No. of seasons: 1
- No. of episodes: 19

Production
- Executive producers: Rob Dames; Bob Myer; John J. Strauss
- Producers: Rita Dillon; Kim C. Friese
- Cinematography: Daniel Flannery
- Running time: 22–24 minutes
- Production companies: Bob Myer Productions; ABC Productions

Original release
- Network: ABC
- Release: September 20, 1994 – February 28, 1995

Me and the Boys is an American sitcom that aired on the ABC network from September 20, 1994 until February 28, 1995. The series features comedian Steve Harvey, who also served as a writer, in his first starring role. The series was created by Bob Myer, Rob Dames and Lenny Ripps, and produced by a.k.a. Productions and Bob Myer Productions in association with ABC Productions.

== Synopsis ==
Set in Dallas, Me and the Boys stars Steve Harvey as Steve Tower, a widower with three sons who ran a video store called The Video Depot. Madge Sinclair co-starred as Steve's mother-in-law, Mary Cook. Chaz Lamar Shepherd, Wayne Collins, Jr., and Benjamin LeVert played Steve's sons Artis, William, and Andrew, respectively.

The series was scheduled on Tuesdays following Full House (which co-creators Dames and Ripps had previously written and produced on) and preceding Home Improvement. Despite ranking #20 in the ratings, ABC canceled the series after one season not because of poor ratings, but that the network felt the show was too "kid-driven" at a time when they were playing catchup in offering adult-driven early primetime series.

== Cast ==
=== Main ===
- Steve Harvey as Steve Tower
- Chaz Lamar Shepherd as Artis Tower, Steve's eldest son
- Wayne Collins Jr. as William Tower, Steve's middle son
- Benjamin LeVert as Andrew Tower, Steve's youngest son
- Madge Sinclair as Mary Cook, Steve's mother-in-law

=== Recurring ===
- Karen Malina White as Janet Tower, Steve's sister, an insurance agent

== Episodes ==
No.	Title	Directed by	Written by	Original release date	Prod. code	Viewers (millions)
1	"Pilot"	Andrew D. Weyman	Bob Myer; Leonard Ripps	September 20, 1994	49401	25.0
Steve teaches his middle son William a lesson about honesty when he catches William at the movies watching a horror movie that he isn't allowed to see.
2	"The Hunt for Miss October"	Andrew D. Weyman	Michael Poryes	September 27, 1994	49402	22.1
When Steve finds out that Artis and William both own girlie magazines, he tells his sons to get rid of them because he does not want them objectifying women. When all of Andrew's classmates have great art projects that their parents did for them, while Andrew is left with his own crude work, Steve proudly announces that Andrew is to be commended for self-sufficiency and craftsmanship as he did the work on his own. The collision of both plotlines causes Steve to be the one explaining everything to the principal.
3	"Your Cheatin' Heart"	Andrew D. Weyman	Sheryl North	October 4, 1994	49405	19.6
Steve offers William an incentive to turn his black history grade from an F to an A: a CD player.
4	"Curfew, God Bless You"	Andrew D. Weyman	Steve Young	October 11, 1994	49406	19.5
Artis sneaks out to a party; Andrew forgets to do his homework.
5	"Crushed"	Andrew D. Weyman	Bob Myer; Leonard Ripps	October 18, 1994	49403	19.7
Steve tries to prevent William from being humiliated when William wears his heart on his sleeve for an uninterested older girl.
6	"Every Good Boy Does Fine"	Andrew D. Weyman	Bob Myer; Leonard Ripps; Rob Dames	October 25, 1994	49404	19.9
Steve and Mary must face the music and tell Andrew that he can't play the piano as well as his older brothers.
7	"Black Dads Can't Jump"	Andrew D. Weyman	Gary Hardwick	November 1, 1994	49407	22.2
Steve assigns himself as Artis' personal basketball coach.
8	"Talent Show"	Jay Sandrich	Ed Decter; John J. Strauss	November 15, 1994	49409	22.1
Steve can hardly stop his head from spinning when the Four Tops pay a surprise visit to Mary's church fundraiser and wind up performing.
9	"Bad Influence"	Andrew D. Weyman	Leonard Ripps; Rob Dames	November 22, 1994	49410	19.1
Steve and William have a falling out when William falls in with the wrong crowd at school. Meanwhile, Mary is slow to tell Andrew that she accidentally drove over his pet turtle.
10	"We're Off to See the Lizard"	Andrew D. Weyman	Lee Aronsohn	November 29, 1994	49408	19.1
Artis gets all wound up over the fact that his father is paying a video store co-worker more money per house, and takes a job at a pizza joint, which requires him to dress like a lizard. Meanwhile, Steve spends some quality time with Andrew.
11	"Oops, There It Is?"	Andrew D. Weyman	J. Anthony Brown; Rushian McDonald	December 6, 1994	49412	21.0
Andrew's teacher (Denise Dowse) draws the wrong conclusion when Andrew hands in a picture that he drew of Steve and his girlfriend kissing...naked.
12	"Christmas Story"	Andrew D. Weyman	Bob Myer; Leonard Ripps; Rob Dames	December 13, 1994	49411	21.2
Andrew refuses to pose for a family Christmas photo because it is the family's first Christmas photo taken since the boys' mother, Julia, passed away.
13	"Blast From the Past"	Andrew D. Weyman	Bob Myer; Leonard Ripps; Rob Dames	January 3, 1995	49414	21.2
Steve picks up bad vibrations when members of his former band, The Four Vibes, ask Artis to join them in a performance at their high school reunion.
14	"Money to Burn"	Andrew D. Weyman	Bob Myer; Leonard Ripps; Rob Dames	January 10, 1995	49413	21.8
Steve's joy at winning $1,000 in the lottery gradually disappears -- along with the money -- as the demands of friends and family mount.
15	"The Kiss-Off"	Andrew D. Weyman	Bob Myer; Leonard Ripps; Rob Dames	January 17, 1995	49415	18.8
Steve appears on a local television talk show.
16	"The Age of Reason"	Andrew D. Weyman	Kim Friese; Jane Espenson	February 7, 1995	49416	21.2
Steve starts feeling a little long in the tooth when he bites off more than he can chew trying to impress attractive doctor Sheryl during a physical exam.
17	"Goldilocks"	Andrew D. Weyman	John J. Strauss; Bob Myer	February 14, 1995	49417	19.7
Steve has his eye on attractive police officer Nina, who's assigned to keep an eye on his house after a Goldilocks-style burglar breaks in several times to make himself temporarily at home.
18	"The 'B' Word"	Andrew D. Weyman	J. Anthony Brown; Rushion McDonald; Steve Harvey	February 21, 1995	49418	18.4
Steve continues to pursue a romantic relationship with police officer Nina, but he remains at arm's length when it seems that her feelings for him are more of the brotherly kind.
19	"When Stanley Met Shirley"	Andrew D. Weyman	Leonard Ripps; Rob Dames; Ed Decter	February 28, 1995	49419	20.9
Artis has his friends sneak him into a dance club for his 17th birthday, but the celebration hits a sour note when he realizes that Steve is there also.

== Awards and nominations ==
Year	Award	Category	Recipient	Result
1995	ASCAP Film and Television Music Awards	Top TV Series	Donald Markowitz	Won
1995	Young Artist Awards	Best New Family Television Series	Me and the Boys	Nominated
1995	Young Artist Awards	Best Performance by an Actor Under Ten in a TV Series	Benjamin LeVert	Nominated
