= The Lizzie McGuire Movie =

2003 film by Jim Fall

- Theatrical release poster
- Directed by: Jim Fall
- Written by: Susan Estelle Jansen; Ed Decter; John J. Strauss
- Based on: Lizzie McGuire by Terri Minsky
- Produced by: Stan Rogow
- Starring: Hilary Duff; Adam Lamberg; Robert Carradine; Hallie Todd; Jake Thomas
- Cinematography: Jerzy Zieliński
- Edited by: Margie Goodspeed
- Music by: Cliff Eidelman
- Production companies: Walt Disney Pictures; Stan Rogow Productions
- Distributed by: Buena Vista Pictures Distribution
- Release date: May 2, 2003 (United States)
- Running time: 90 minutes
- Country: United States
- Languages: English; Italian
- Budget: $17 million
- Box office: $55.5 million

The Lizzie McGuire Movie is a 2003 American teen comedy film directed by Jim Fall and starring Hilary Duff, Adam Lamberg, Robert Carradine, Hallie Todd, and Jake Thomas. It serves as the finale of the Disney Channel television series Lizzie McGuire and was the first theatrical film based on a Disney Channel property. It follows the title character and her classmates on a graduation trip to Rome, where she gets mistaken for a famous Italian pop star and embarks on an unexpected adventure. The events of the film take place after the second and final season of Lizzie McGuire.

The Lizzie McGuire Movie was theatrically released in the United States on May 2, 2003, by Buena Vista Pictures Distribution, ranking second at the box office behind X2 and grossing $55.5 million worldwide against a budget of $17 million. It received mixed reviews upon release, but gained a strong cult following in later years.

== Plot ==
Lizzie McGuire prepares for her junior-high graduation with one of her two closest friends, David "Gordo" Gordon. Their other best friend, Miranda Sanchez, has chosen to skip the graduation ceremony in favor of a trip to Mexico City to visit her relatives. During the ceremony, Lizzie trips onstage and accidentally brings the curtain down on her fellow graduates, which is filmed by her younger brother Matt.

After graduation, Lizzie and her classmates embark on a trip to Rome, chaperoned by their strict future high school principal, Angela Ungermeyer. To their dismay, Lizzie and Kate Saunders are assigned to the same hotel room. While visiting the Trevi Fountain, Lizzie is approached by an Italian pop star named Paolo Valisari, who notices that she bears a striking resemblance to his singing partner, Isabella Parigi.

The next day, Lizzie feigns illness and meets Paolo, who explains that he and Isabella are booked for the International Music Video Awards, but she left Italy after their partnership breakup. He tells Lizzie that Isabella lip syncs and begs her to pose as her for the ceremony. Lizzie reluctantly agrees but soon begins to enjoy the experience and falls for Paolo. Lizzie continues to fake being ill to prepare for the ceremony. Kate finds out and agrees to help her, leading to a mutual friendship. Ms. Ungermeyer grows suspicious, leading Gordo to take the blame and resulting in him being sent back home as punishment.

Matt finds Italian gossip sites with pictures of Lizzie as Isabella. He initially tells his parents he misses Lizzie, convincing his parents to fly them to Rome, during which his parents find out about Lizzie's exploits. At the airport, Gordo meets the real Isabella, who is upset that someone has been impersonating her. The two find Lizzie and warn her that Paolo is planning to have a nervous Lizzie unknowingly sing live at the ceremony, as Isabella actually does, creating the impression that Isabella is a fake, which would damage the latter's career and embarrass Lizzie. The McGuires find Ms. Ungermeyer and reach the award show to find Lizzie.

During the performance, Isabella and Gordo expose Paolo, who is actually the one who lip syncs, by turning on his microphone, revealing his real mediocre singing voice. Upset, he runs off stage, where his displeased manager Sergei resigns, and gets ambushed outside by paparazzi. Isabella introduces Lizzie to the crowd, and the two of them sing "What Dreams Are Made Of".

When Isabella leaves the stage, Lizzie finishes the song solo, displaying a newfound confidence. Later, they celebrate at the hotel's after party, where Ms. Ungermeyer rescinds Gordo's punishment and flirts with Sergei. Although Lizzie's dad tells her she is grounded for the rest of the summer, he says he and her mom are still proud of her. Lizzie and Gordo then sneak away from the party to go up to the roof, where they promise to never let things change between them. They kiss and then rejoin the party.

== Cast ==
- Hilary Duff as Elizabeth "Lizzie" McGuire and Isabella Parigi
  - Haylie Duff as Isabella Parigi (singing voice)
- Adam Lamberg as David "Gordo" Gordon, Lizzie's best friend and love interest
- Robert Carradine as Samuel "Sam" McGuire, Lizzie and Matt's father
- Hallie Todd as Joanne "Jo" McGuire, Lizzie and Matt's mother
- Jake Thomas as Matthew "Matt" McGuire, Lizzie's younger brother
- Yani Gellman as Paolo Valisari, an Italian pop star who is Isabella's former singing partner
- Alex Borstein as Ms. Angela Ungermeyer, Lizzie, Gordo, Kate and Ethan's chaperone
- Clayton Snyder as Ethan Craft, Lizzie and Gordo's classmate
- Ashlie Brillault as Katherine "Kate" Sanders, Lizzie's popular ex-best friend
- Brendan Kelly as Sergei, Paolo's bodyguard
- Carly Schroeder as Melina Bianco, Matt's best friend
- Daniel Escobar as Mr. Escobar, the drama teacher/choir director at Hillridge Junior High School
- Jody Raicot as Giorgio
- Terra MacLeod as Franca DiMontecatini
- Claude Knowlton as the stage manager
- Peter Kelamis as Doctor Comito, an Italian physician

== Production ==
The film, produced by Stan Rogow, was directed by Jim Fall from a screenplay by Susan Estelle Jansen, Ed Decter and John J. Strauss. It was filmed on location in Rome, Italy in the fall of 2002, with some additional scenes shot in Vancouver, Canada. Most of the series characters reprised their roles, except for Lalaine (Miranda Sanchez), who left the series late in the second season to film the Disney Channel original movie You Wish! In the movie, her character is said to be on vacation with her family in Mexico City. During an interview with HuffPost in 2015, Lalaine said she was too busy doing work outside of Lizzie McGuire to participate in the film. However, according to the 2024 book Disney High: The Untold Story of the Rise and Fall of Disney Channel's Tween Empire, Lalaine and Duff had a quarrel in the final season of the television series, which led to Lalaine being let go early from her contract. Lizzie McGuire casting director Robin Lippin said, "I don't believe that Hilary wanted her to be part of the movie. It probably would have been uncomfortable for both of them." Additionally, the characters Claire Miller, Larry Tudgeman, and Lanny Onassis were absent from the film.

Fall, an openly gay filmmaker, had previously directed the R-rated film Trick, after which he began pitching and searching gay-related projects in Hollywood. He found that the script for The Lizzie McGuire Movie had some similarities with this earlier film: "Both movies end in a kiss, both movies have musical numbers, [and] both movies have cute boys." Disney wanted the film to feel and look different from the show it is based on, and supported many of Fall's ideas, including the suggestion to shoot in widescreen.

New York's Tapehouse Toons again handled the animation sequences involving Lizzie's cartoon alter ego, just like in the television show. This marked their first time working on a feature film, after being approached by Disney, who normally handled these types of projects at their in-house animation studio. Tapehouse had to hire 15 additional people for the task of completing the film, thus expanding their core group of five employees.

== Reception ==
=== Box office ===
In its opening weekend, the film grossed $17.3 million in 2,825 theaters in the United States and Canada, ranking second behind X2: X-Men United. The Lizzie McGuire Movie grossed $42.7 million domestically and $12.8 million internationally for a worldwide total of $55.5 million.

=== Critical response ===
On Rotten Tomatoes, the film holds an approval rating of 41% based on 101 reviews, with an average rating of 5.3/10. The site's critics consensus calls the film: "A harmless piece of fluff that ought to satisfy fans of the TV show." On Metacritic the film has a weighted average score of 56 out of 100 based on 28 critics, indicating "mixed or average reviews". Audiences polled by CinemaScore gave the film an average grade of "B" on an A+ to F scale.

Scott Brown of Entertainment Weekly gave the film a B+: "Let's face it: Lizzie McGuire (Hilary Duff) is just too darn polished to be a junior-high underdog, even by the standards of her 'luxe suburban environs'. But that hasn't tarnished her comeback-kid cred among the six-and-ups who faithfully follow her Disney Channel show—and it doesn't make The Lizzie McGuire Movie, a clever, agreeably weightless theatrical outing, any less enjoyable." Roger Ebert gave the film two stars out of four, but praised Borstein's performance, calling her work "the only really delightful element in the movie; everything else is simply slick and professional."

=== Awards ===
- 2003 (won): Teen Choice Award for Movie Breakout Star, Female (Hilary Duff)
- 2003 (nominated): Teen Choice Awards for Movie Comedy, Movie Comedy Actress (Hilary Duff)
- 2004 (nominated): Leo Award for Feature-Length Drama: Best Visual Effects (Gary Gutierrez, Jayne Craig, Bruce Woloshyn, Simon Ager and Wes Sargent)

== Home media ==
The film was released on DVD and VHS on August 12, 2003. The video sold 2.90 million copies earning a profit of over 50.5 million dollars. It is also included on Disney's streaming service, Disney+.

== Cancelled expanded franchise ==
Following the release of the film, there were plans to continue the Lizzie McGuire series, one of which included a planned sequel film that entered early development, but was ultimately shelved due to creative differences between Duff and Disney. In August 2019, it was announced that a Lizzie McGuire revival would be entering production for Disney+, with Duff, Lamberg, Thomas, Todd and Carradine returning to the series to reprise their respective roles, along with Terri Minsky planned to return as showrunner. The revival series began production in association with Disney Channel, but stalled midway through in January 2020 following Minsky's departure amid creative differences. The revival series was later cancelled in December of the same year.
