= David Krumholtz =

American actor

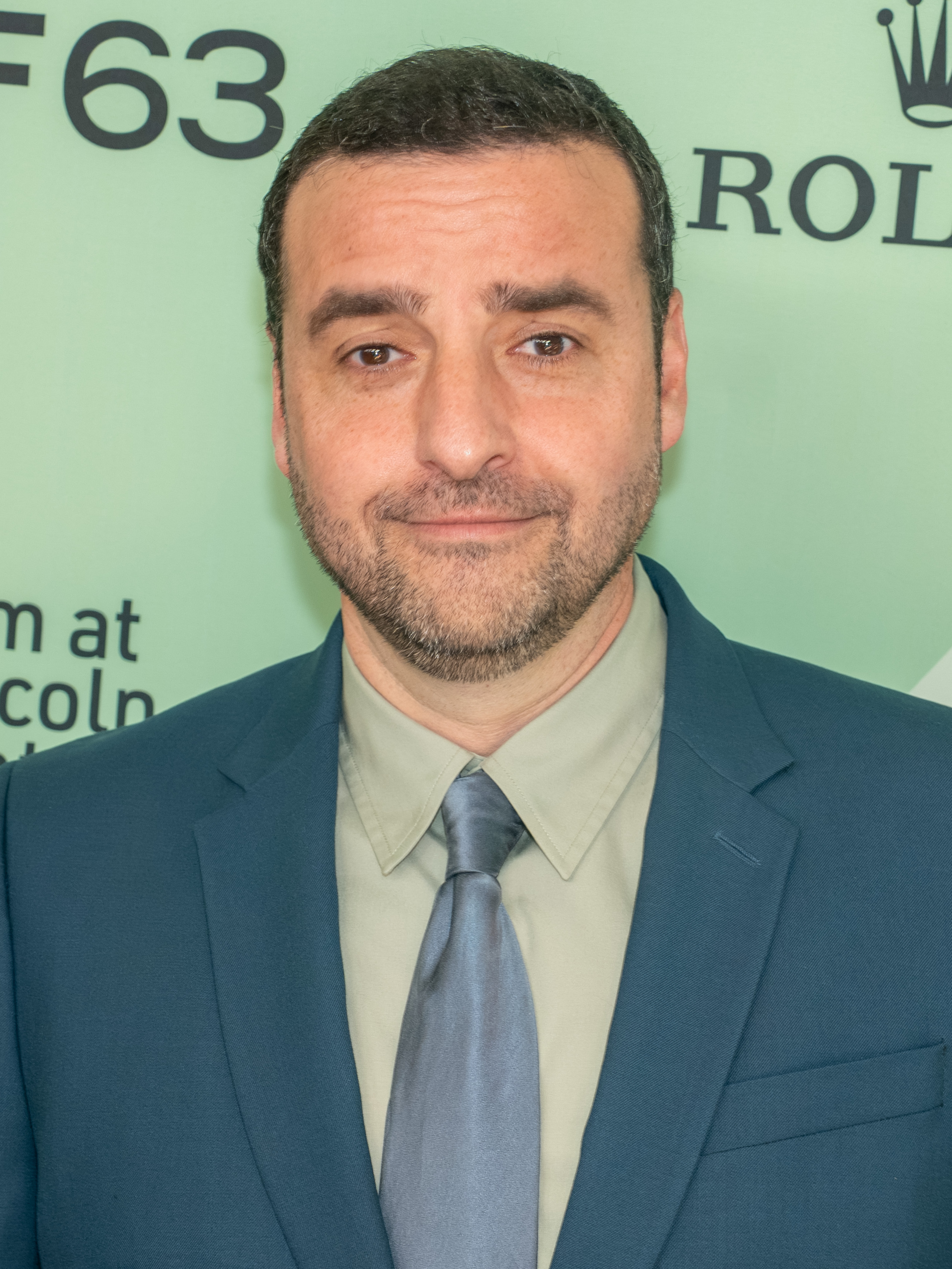
- Krumholtz at the 2025 New York Film Festival
- Born: May 15, 1978 (age 48); New York City, U.S.
- Occupation: Actor
- Years active: 1992–present
- Spouse: Vanessa Britting (m. 2010)
- Children: 2

David Krumholtz (born May 15, 1978) is an American actor. He is best known for portraying Bernard in The Santa Clause franchise (1994–2022), Michael Eckman in 10 Things I Hate About You (1999), Goldstein in the Harold & Kumar film trilogy (2004–2011), Charlie Eppes in the CBS drama series Numb3rs (2005–2010) and Isidor Isaac Rabi in Oppenheimer (2023).

Krumholtz has also had other supporting roles in notable films such as Addams Family Values (1993), The Ice Storm (1997), Slums of Beverly Hills (1998), Ray (2004), Serenity (2005), Superbad (2007), Hail, Caesar! (2016), Sausage Party (2016), Wonder Wheel (2017), and The Ballad of Buster Scruggs (2018). He also portrayed Harvey Wasserman in the HBO drama series The Deuce (2017–2019) and Monty Levin in the HBO miniseries The Plot Against America (2020).

Krumholtz made his Broadway debut in the 1992 play Conversations with My Father. He returned to Broadway playing Hermann Merz in Tom Stoppard's semi-biographical Holocaust play Leopoldstadt (2022), for which he received a Drama League Award nomination. In August 2026, Krumholtz announced he was taking a hiatus from acting, which subsequently ended in October.

== Early life ==
Krumholtz was born in New York City and grew up in Forest Hills, Queens. He is the son of Michael, a postal worker, and Judy Krumholtz, a dental assistant. He grew up in a "very working class, almost poor" Jewish family. His paternal grandparents had emigrated from Poland, and his mother moved from Hungary to the U.S. in 1956 during the Hungarian Revolution. He attended P.S. 196, Stephen A. Halsey Junior High School 157, and briefly attended Forest Hills High School.

== Career ==
=== 1992–1999 ===
At the age of 13, Krumholtz followed his friends to an open audition for the Broadway play Conversations with My Father (1992). When he tried out, he won the role of Young Charlie, with Judd Hirsch, Tony Shalhoub and Jason Biggs, who was also making his Broadway debut. Soon after his run on Broadway, Krumholtz co-starred in two feature films, Life With Mikey (1993) with Michael J. Fox and Addams Family Values (1993) with Christina Ricci. For his role in Mikey, Krumholtz was nominated for a 1993 Young Artist Award. Although his work in these two films garnered him critical attention, Krumholtz is probably best known by children as the sarcastic head elf Bernard from The Santa Clause (1994) and its first sequel, The Santa Clause 2 (2002). While he did not appear in The Santa Clause 3: The Escape Clause (2006) due to a scheduling conflict and his belief that the character was devalued, he reprised the role two decades later in the Disney+ series The Santa Clauses (2022).

In 1994, Krumholtz co-starred in his first television series, Monty, with Henry Winkler; the show lasted only a few episodes. Krumholtz later starred in several short-lived series over the years. Along the way, he had the opportunity to work with Jason Bateman (Chicago Sons, 1997), Tom Selleck (The Closer, 1998), Jon Cryer (The Trouble with Normal, 2000), and Rob Lowe (The Lyon's Den, 2003). In 2005, he finally found television success with the CBS series Numb3rs. Along with his starring roles on television, Krumholtz made guest appearances on ER as schizophrenic patient Paul Sobriki, as well as on Law & Order, Law & Order: Special Victims Unit, Lucky, Freaks and Geeks, and Undeclared.

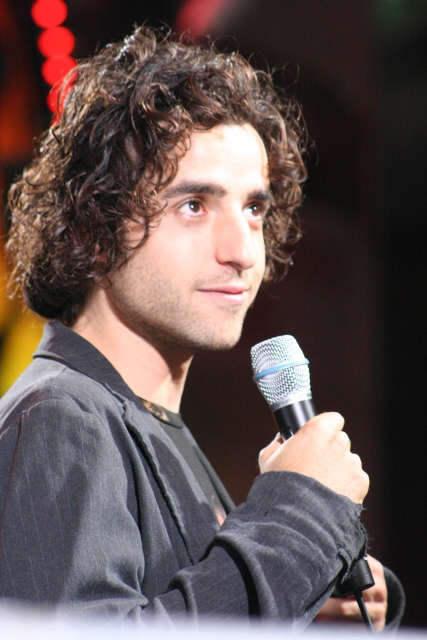
Krumholtz at the premiere of Serenity in September 2005

He broke out of the children's movie genre with The Ice Storm (1997), directed by Ang Lee, and Slums of Beverly Hills (1998), starring Alan Arkin and Natasha Lyonne. In 1999, Krumholtz starred as Michael Eckman in the popular teen movie 10 Things I Hate About You with Larisa Oleynik, Joseph Gordon-Levitt, Julia Stiles, and Heath Ledger. That same year, he portrayed a completely different teen character – that of Yussel, a young conflicted Jewish man in Liberty Heights (1999).

=== 2001–2011 ===
It was the role of Yussel that brought Krumholtz to the attention of actor and filmmaker Edward Burns, who cast him in the independent film Sidewalks of New York (2001).

Krumholtz's first role as a leading man was in the romantic comedy You Stupid Man (2002), opposite Milla Jovovich. Although never released theatrically in the United States, You Stupid Man, directed by Edward Burns's brother Brian Burns, was released on DVD (2006).

Krumholtz carried another leading role in Big Shot: Confessions of a Campus Bookie (2002), which premiered on FX Networks. Big Shot was a true story based on the Arizona State University basketball fixing scandal in 1994. Krumholtz played Benny Silman, a college student and campus bookmaker, who was jailed for his part in shaving points off key Arizona State basketball games. Benny was unlike any character Krumholtz had played before; and he garnered critical praise for his performance, proving that he was not just a sidekick.

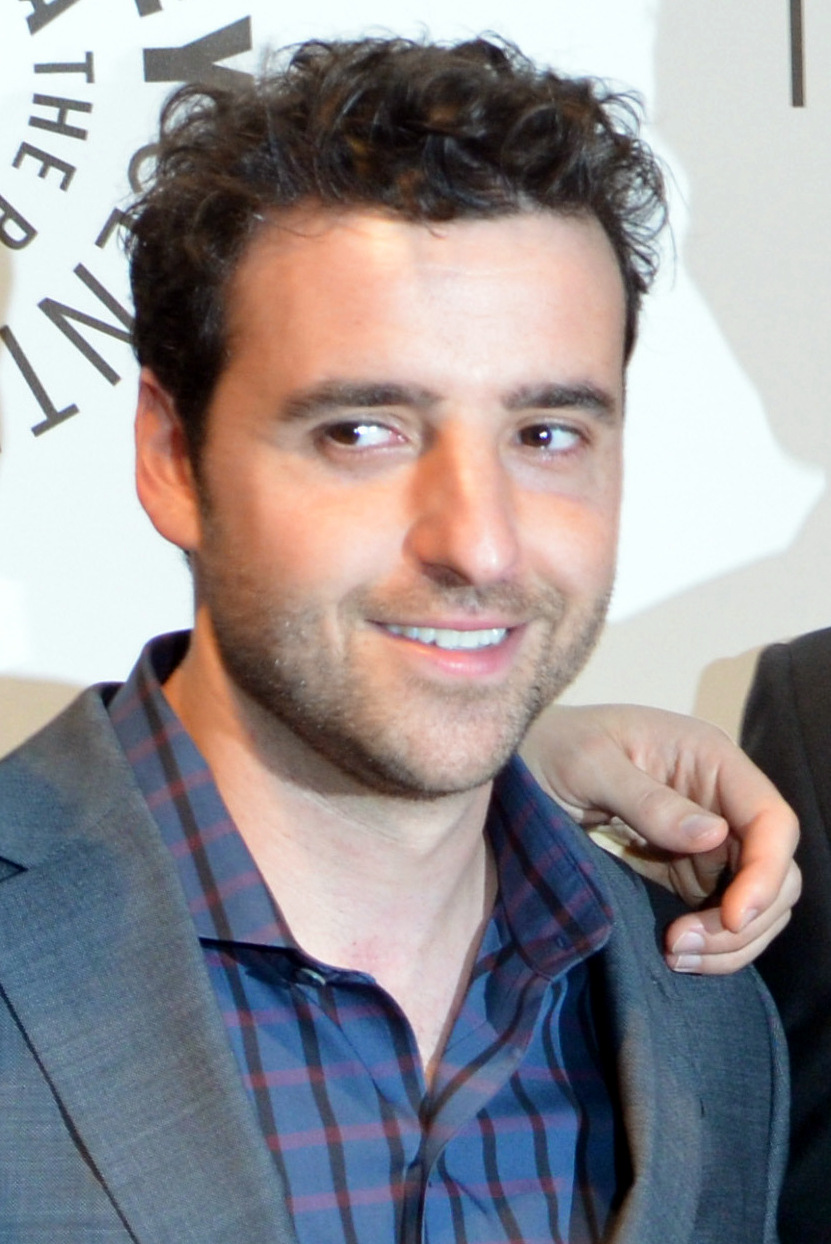
Krumholtz at the 2012 PaleyFest

In 2005, Krumholtz played Max in My Suicidal Sweetheart (formerly Max and Grace), once again starring opposite actress Natasha Lyonne. Krumholtz also returned to smaller roles in the successful films Ray (2004) and Harold & Kumar Go to White Castle (2004), along with its two sequels. In September 2005, he was seen in Joss Whedon's science fiction film Serenity as "Mr. Universe", a hacker and information broker. In early 2006, Krumholtz's 2003 film Kill the Poor screened in New York City at IFC Center and across the country on Comcast's On Demand cable service.

From 2005 to 2010, Krumholtz starred on the CBS television show Numb3rs, portraying Charlie Eppes, a genius who used mathematics to help his FBI agent brother Don (Rob Morrow) solve crimes. The cast of Numbers also included Judd Hirsch and Peter MacNicol, who appeared with Krumholtz in Addams Family Values as a camp counselor. Critic Matt Roush (TV Guide) called Krumholtz's work on Numbers "probably his best TV work to date". Numbers was cancelled by CBS on May 18, 2010. He starred in the 2010 TV film/series pilot Tax Man on Fox but was not picked up to series. He starred in The Playboy Club on NBC in 2011, but the show was cancelled after three episodes.

=== 2012–present ===
In 2012, Krumholtz was cast opposite Michael Urie in CBS' comedy TV series Partners but the show was cancelled after six episodes. In 2015, he played the title role wearing heavy prosthetics as an elderly Jewish woman in the IFC comedy series Gigi Does It which he wrote and co-created with Ricky Mabe and Zach Golden.

In recent years, he has had minor roles in the Coen brothers films Hail Caesar! (2016) and The Ballad of Buster Scruggs (2018), while also appearing in films such as This Is the End (2013), The Judge (2014), Sausage Party (2016), and Wonder Wheel (2017). He had a prominent recurring role as adult filmmaker Harvey Wasserman in the first two seasons of the HBO drama series The Deuce, before being promoted to a series regular for the third season. In 2020, he appeared as a series regular playing Monty Levin in the HBO miniseries The Plot Against America.

In fall 2022, Krumholtz returned to the stage to play the role of Hermann Merz in the original Broadway cast of Tom Stoppard’s Leopoldstadt at The Longacre Theater in New York City. Variety described his performance as "vulnerable and powerful". He earned a nomination for the Drama League Award for Outstanding Performance. The following year Krumholtz portrayed physicist Isidor Isaac Rabi in Christopher Nolan's biographical drama Oppenheimer (2023). In 2026, he played Zor-El in Supergirl. In the same year he announced a hiatus from acting, and further clarified that he was not retiring.

His hiatus ended in October when he was cast in the HBO series The Trial of Louise Woodward.

== Personal life ==
On May 22, 2010, Krumholtz married actress Vanessa Britting (born Vanessa Almeda Goonan), at the Plaza Hotel in New York City; they had been engaged since July 2008. They have a daughter and a son, both born in the 2010s. In 2017, they moved from Los Angeles to Wyckoff, New Jersey.

In July 2011, Krumholtz was diagnosed with thyroid cancer. He began a radioactive iodine treatment five months later. At the end of January 2012, he was pronounced cancer-free.

On October 4, 2024, Krumholtz was interviewed by The New York Times regarding cannabis reliance; Krumholtz had lost over 100 pounds and was hospitalized several times. He was diagnosed with cannabinoid hyperemesis syndrome and has since stopped using marijuana.

== Filmography ==
=== Film ===
Year	Title	Role	Notes
1993	Life with Mikey	Barry Corman	
1993	Addams Family Values	Joel Glicker	
1994	The Santa Clause	Head Elf Bernard	
1997	The Ice Storm	Francis Davenport	
1998	Slums of Beverly Hills	Ben Abromowitz	
1999	10 Things I Hate About You	Michael Eckman	
1999	Liberty Heights	Yussel	
2000	How to Kill Your Neighbor's Dog	Brian Sellars	
2001	The Mexican	Beck	
2001	Sidewalks of New York	Benjamin Bazler	
2001	Two Can Play That Game	Jason	
2001	According to Spencer	Ezra	
2002	You Stupid Man	Owen	
2002	The Santa Clause 2	Head Elf Bernard	
2002	Cheats	Evan Rosengarden	
2003	Scorched	Max	
2003	Kill the Poor	Joe Peltz	
2004	Looking for Kitty	Abe Fiannico	
2004	Harold & Kumar Go to White Castle	Goldstein	
2004	Ray	Milt Shaw	
2005	Guess Who	Jerry MacNamara	Uncredited
2005	My Suicidal Sweetheart	Max	
2005	Serenity	Mr. Universe	
2006	American Storage	Kurt	Short film
2006	The Nail	Daniel	Short film
2006	Bobby	Agent Phil	
2006	Tenacious D in The Pick of Destiny	Frat boy #2	Deleted scene
2007	Live!	Rex	
2007	Superbad	Benji Austin	
2007	Battle for Terra	Terrian Commander (voice)	
2007	Walk Hard: The Dewey Cox Story	Schwartzberg	
2008	Demption	Detective Joseph Schneider	Short film
2008	Harold & Kumar Escape from Guantanamo Bay	Goldstein	
2009	I Love You, Man	Sydney's buddy #3	Uncredited
2011	Mr. Popper's Penguins	Kent	
2011	A Very Harold & Kumar 3D Christmas	Goldstein	
2013	Tuna	Getty	
2013	The Big Ask	Andrew	
2013	This Is the End	Himself	
2014	The Judge	Mike Kattan	
2015	I Saw the Light	James Dolan	
2016	Hail, Caesar!	Communist screenwriter #4	
2016	Sausage Party	Kareem Abdul Lavash (voice)	
2016	Casual Encounters	Sammy Deetz	
2016	Ghost Team	Stan	
2017	Wonder Wheel	Jake	
2018	A Futile and Stupid Gesture	Time-Life Publisher	
2018	The Ballad of Buster Scruggs	Frenchman in Saloon	Segment: "The Ballad of Buster Scruggs"
2019	Frances Ferguson	Group Therapy Leader	
2019	Crown Vic	Stroke Adams	
2020	Asking for It	The Cop	
2023	Oppenheimer	Isidor Isaac Rabi	
2023	Lousy Carter	Lousy Carter	
2024	If That Mockingbird Don't Sing	Alfonso	
2025	Forelock	Randy	
2025	Springsteen: Deliver Me from Nowhere	Al Teller	
2025	Paradise Records	Wise Guy #2	
2026	Influenced	Gary	
2026	Kill Me	Lou	
2026	Supergirl	Zor-El	
2026	Mr. Irrelevant	Julius "Whitey" Horai	Post-production
TBA	Lizard Music †	(voice)	Filming

=== Television ===
Year	Title	Role	Notes
1993	Law & Order	Scott Fisher	Episode: "Sweeps"
1994	Monty	David Richardson	5 episodes
1995	Pig Sty	Timmy	Episode: "Tess Makes the Man"
1997	Chicago Sons	Billy Kulchak	13 episodes
1997	Justice League of America	Martin Walters	Pilot
1997	Union Square	Russell	2 episodes
1998	The Closer	Bruno Verma	10 episodes
2000–2002	ER	Paul Sobriki	3 episodes
2000	The Trouble with Normal	Bob Wexler	13 episodes
2000	Freaks and Geeks	Barry Schweiber	Episode: "Noshing and Moshing"
2001–2002	Undeclared	Greg	2 episodes
2002	Big Shot: Confessions of a Campus Bookie	Benny Silman	Television film
2003	Lucky	Tony	Episode: "Savant"
2003	The Lyon's Den	Jeff Fineman	8 episodes
2005–2010	Numb3rs	Charlie Eppes	118 episodes
2007	Wainy Days	Ortez	Episode: "Tough Guy"
2010	Tax Man	Spencer	Pilot
2010, 2024	Law & Order: Special Victims Unit	Dr. Vincent Prochik / Dr. Ray Goldberg	2 episodes
2011	The Playboy Club	Billy Rosen	7 episodes
2012	Raising Hope	Carl	2 episodes
2012	Don't Trust the B— in Apartment 23	Patrick Kelly	Episode: "Shitagi Nashi..."
2012	The Newsroom	Dr. Jacob "Jack" Habib	3 episodes
2012	Partners	Joe Goodman	13 episodes
2012	Childrens Hospital	Dookie	Episode: "Wisedocs"
2013–2014	The League	Joel Cocque	2 episodes
2014	Newsreaders	Mark Jones	Episode: "Motorboating Dads; the Negative $100,000 Question"
2014	Key & Peele	Terrorist #3	Episode: "Terrorist Meeting"
2014	Men at Work	Myron	5 episodes
2014–2016	The Good Wife	Josh Mariner	7 episodes
2015	Forever	1984 Abe	Episode: "Punk is Dead"
2015	Gigi Does It	Gigi	8 episodes; also co-creator and executive producer
2015	Comedy Bang! Bang!	Himself	Episode: "David Krumholtz Wears a Blue Zip-Up Jacket and Grey Sneakers"
2015	Master of None	Nathan	Episode: "Plan B"
2015–2016	Mom	Gregory Munschnick	5 episodes
2015–2017	All Hail King Julien	Timo / Additional voices	23 episodes
2016	The Interestings	Ethan Figman	Pilot
2017–2019	The Deuce	Harvey Wasserman	20 episodes
2017	Difficult People	Ray	Episode: "Criminal Minds"
2018	Living Biblically	Rabbi Gil Ableman	13 episodes
2018	Star vs. the Forces of Evil	Cobalt Ferrero (voice)	Episode: "Marco Jr."
2018	Billions	Frotty Anisman	Episode: "Redemption"
2019	At Home with Amy Sedaris	Angelo DiBeverly	Episode: "Game Night"
2020	Awkwafina Is Nora from Queens	Jerry Harrison	Episode: "Launch Party"
2020	The Plot Against America	Monty Levin	6 episodes
2020	The Twilight Zone	Mayor John Conway	Episode: "A Small Town"
2021	WWE Monday Night Raw	Fake Drew McIntyre	Episode: "Jan 18th, 2021"
2021	Blue's Clues & You!	Mr. Oregano	Episode: "Blue's Big Neighborhood Adventure"
2021–2022	Wolfboy and the Everything Factory	(voice)	2 episodes
2022	Super Pumped	Sergey Brin	2 episodes
2022	Angelyne	Max Allen's Lawyer	Episode: "The Tease"
2022	The Santa Clauses	Bernard	Episode: "Chapter Five: Across the Yule-Verse"
2023	White House Plumbers	William O. Bittman	2 episodes
2024	Sausage Party: Foodtopia	Kareem Abdul Lavash (voice)	5 episodes
2024	Batman: Caped Crusader	Fletcher Demming (voice)	Episode: "The Stress of Her Regard"
2025	The Studio	Mitch Weitz	3 episodes
2025	Poker Face	JB Turner	Episode: "Sloppy Joseph"
2025	Long Story Short	Ira Schwartz (voice)	Episode: "The Intervention"
2025	Tales of the Teenage Mutant Ninja Turtles	Knox (voice)	2 episodes
2026	The Rookie	Ezra Kaine	Episode: "The Red Place"
2027	The Trial of Louise Woodward	Harvey Silverglate	Limited Series

=== Theatre ===
Year	Title	Role	Notes
1992–1993	Conversations with My Father	Young Charlie	Royale Theatre; March 22, 1992 – March 14, 1993
2011	Copenhagen	Werner Heisenberg	LA Theatre Works
2013	The Columnist	David Halberstam	LA Theatre Works
2022	Leopoldstadt	Hermann Merz	Longacre Theatre
2026	Are You Now or Have You Ever Been	Abe Burrows	New York City Center

== Awards and nominations ==
Year	Award	Category	Nominated work	Result
1994	Young Artist Awards	Best Youth Actor Leading Role in a Motion Picture Comedy	Life with Mikey	Nominated
1999	Teen Choice Awards	Funniest Movie Scene	10 Things I Hate About You	Nominated
2006	Hollywood Film Awards	Ensemble of the Year (shared with the cast)	Bobby	Won
2007	Screen Actors Guild Awards	Outstanding Performance by a Cast in a Motion Picture (shared with the cast)	Bobby	Nominated
2024	Gold Derby Awards	Ensemble Cast (shared with the cast)	Oppenheimer	Won
