= The Wild =

2006 film by Steve Williams

- Theatrical release poster
- Directed by: Steve "Spaz" Williams
- Screenplay by: Ed Decter; John J. Strauss; Mark Gibson; Philip Halprin
- Story by: Mark Gibson; Philip Halprin
- Produced by: Clint Goldman; Beau Flynn
- Starring: Kiefer Sutherland; Jim Belushi; Eddie Izzard; Janeane Garofalo; William Shatner; Richard Kind; Greg Cipes; Patrick Warburton
- Edited by: Scott Balcerek; Steven L. Wagner
- Music by: Alan Silvestri
- Production companies: Walt Disney Pictures; Hoytyboy Pictures; Sir Zip Studios; Contrafilm; C.O.R.E. Feature Animation; Nigel Productions
- Distributed by: Buena Vista Pictures Distribution (Note: Distributed by Buena Vista Pictures Distribution through the Walt Disney Pictures banner.)
- Release date: April 14, 2006
- Running time: 82 minutes
- Countries: Canada; United States
- Language: English
- Budget: $80 million
- Box office: $102.3 million

The Wild is a 2006 animated adventure comedy film directed by Steve "Spaz" Williams with a screenplay by Ed Decter, John J. Strauss, Mark Gibson and Philip Halprin, and featuring the voices of Kiefer Sutherland, Eddie Izzard, Jim Belushi, Janeane Garofalo, Richard Kind, Greg Cipes, Patrick Warburton and William Shatner. The film's plot centers around Samson, a male lion who loses his pre-teen son, Ryan, who wanders off and accidentally gets shipped from the Central Park Zoo to Africa, leading his father to team up with a group of animals as they embark on a journey to save his lost son.

Produced by Walt Disney Pictures, Hoytyboy Pictures, Sir Zip Studios, Contrafilm, and Nigel Productions, The Wild was animated by C.O.R.E. Feature Animation, and released by Buena Vista Pictures Distribution in North America on April 14, 2006. The film earned $102 million on an $80 million budget, making it a commercial failure. Reviews were largely negative, with many critics comparing it unfavorably to Madagascar (2005), Finding Nemo (2003), and The Lion King (1994). It was the last film produced by C.O.R.E. before they shut down in 2010.

== Plot ==
In the Central Park Zoo, Samson the lion narrates stories of his adventures in the African savanna to his son Ryan. Ryan dreams of going to the wild to learn how to roar like his father, but Samson dismisses the idea.

During the night, after the zoo closes, Samson and his friends; Benny the squirrel, Bridget the giraffe, Larry the snake, and Nigel the koala, compete in a turtle curling championship. Ryan and his own friends accidentally trigger a stampede, ending the game and causing Samson and Ryan to argue. Ryan wanders into a green intermodal container said to be placed in Africa. After he changes his mind, he accidentally gets locked inside, loaded onto a semi-trailer freight truck, and then shipped away.

With the help of a pigeon Hamir, Samson and his friends set out to rescue Ryan, hitching a ride in a garbage disposal truck. Passing through Times Square, they get cornered by a pack of rabid dogs, and manage to escape through the sewage system. The group take directions to the docks from two streetwise sewer alligator brothers, Stan and Carmine. The next morning, they commandeer a tugboat from the New York Harbor. With the help of Benny and Canadian geese, Samson steers the boat towards the direction of Ryan's ship.

After a couple days, the boat reaches the shores of Africa. They witness a ship evacuating the animals from a dormant volcano, and Ryan running into the jungle. Unable to eat a grumpy hyrax named Colin, Samson reveals to his friends that he wasn't born in the wild. Nigel, Bridget, Larry and Benny head back to the ship, while Samson stays to continue searching for his son.

In the jungle, the quartet are attacked by a herd of black wildebeests who reside in the volcano, capturing Nigel, Bridget and Larry, while Benny is knocked unconscious. Their leader and master of the wildebeests named Kazar, pronounces Nigel "The Great Him," based on an "omen" he received when he was young, believing that "The Great Him" will help his kind alter the food chain so that prey become predators.

Ryan hides up in an old tree, and is attacked by a gang of vultures under Kazar's orders. Samson hears Ryan's cries for help and runs to save him, scaring off the vultures. While hiding from Blag and his army in a tree overlooking a cliff, Samson reveals the truth about his past: he was born in a circus, and just like Ryan, he was unable to roar during a performance, which caused his cruel father to allow them to take him to the zoo where he lied about his origins to avoid further humiliation. Ryan is left shocked and upset by his father's true background. The wildebeests discover them and push Samson over the cliff, while Ryan is captured and taken to the volcano.

After regaining consciousness, Benny finds Samson, and gives him the confidence to be himself. After encountering a couple of chameleons, Samson uses their camouflage abilities to sneak into the volcano to rescue his son and friends. During the fight, Ryan finally lets out a roar for the first time. Seeing the father-son love Samson and Ryan have for each other, the other wildebeests refuse to serve Kazar any further, having grown fed up with his delusions. Enraged, Kazar charges forward, but is pushed back by Samson's powerful roar. As the volcano erupts, the group and wildebeests escape, leaving Kazar to die in the process. Everyone manages to escape on the boat and travel back to New York celebrating.

== Voice cast ==
- Kiefer Sutherland as Samson, a laid-back lion who is the leader of the Central Park Zoo animals.
  - Dominic Scott Kay voices Samson as a cub.
- Jim Belushi as Benny, an Eastern gray squirrel who is Samson's best friend. He is the only one who knows about Samson's past.
- Eddie Izzard as Nigel, an eccentric English-accented koala and co-leader of the zoo. He has an intense loathing for the zoo's koala plush toys portraying him as "cuddly".
- Janeane Garofalo as Bridget, a head-strong reticulated giraffe. Benny has a crush on her, but she does not reciprocate until the end.
- Richard Kind as Larry, a friendly but dull-witted green anaconda.
- William Shatner as Kazar, a tyrannical and bloodthirsty black wildebeest and the leader of a herd of wildebeests who seeks to change the food chain by eating an animal so that "Prey become Predators" and vice versa.
- Greg Cipes as Ryan, an ambitious preteen lion cub and Samson's son.
- Patrick Warburton as Blag, a black wildebeest who is Kazar's second-in-command.
- Colin Hay as Fergus, a Scottish-accented flamingo.
- Miles Marsico as Duke, a mischievous preteen red kangaroo joey and one of Ryan's friends.
- Jack DeSena as Eze, a preteen hippopotamus calf and one of Ryan's friends.
- Don Cherry as Penguin MC, a Southern rockhopper penguin that narrates the Turtle sliding game.
- Lenny Venito as Stan, an American alligator who lives in the sewers.
- Joseph Siravo as Carmine, an American alligator who lives in the sewers and is Stan's brother.
- Colin Cunningham as Colin, a grumpy British-accented rock hyrax.
- Jonathan Kimmel and Eddie Gossling as Scab and Scraw, a pair of Rüppell's vultures who serve as minions of Kazar.
- Kevin Michael Richardson as Samson's callous father and Ryan's paternal grandfather.
- Nika Futterman as Dung Beetle #1
- Julianne Buescher as Dung Beetle #2
- Chris Edgerly as Cloak, a common chameleon.
- Bob Joles as Camo, a Meller's chameleon.
- Jason Harris Katz as Victor, a Magellanic penguin.
- Eric Idle as Wildebeest
- Clinton Leupp (Miss Coco Peru) as Mama Hippo
- David Cowgill as Hamir, an Indian-accented pigeon.

== Production ==
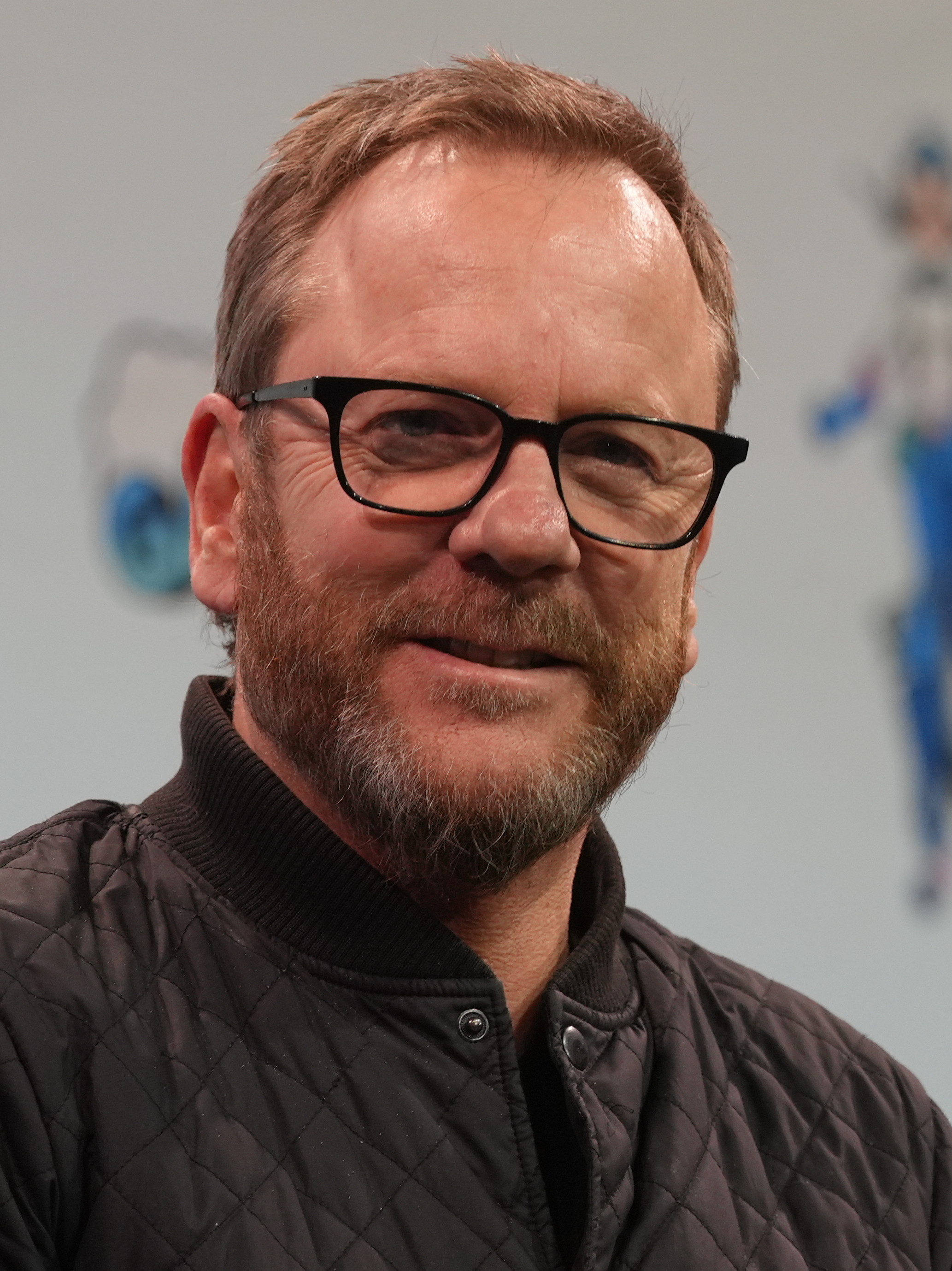
Kiefer Sutherland
(Samson)

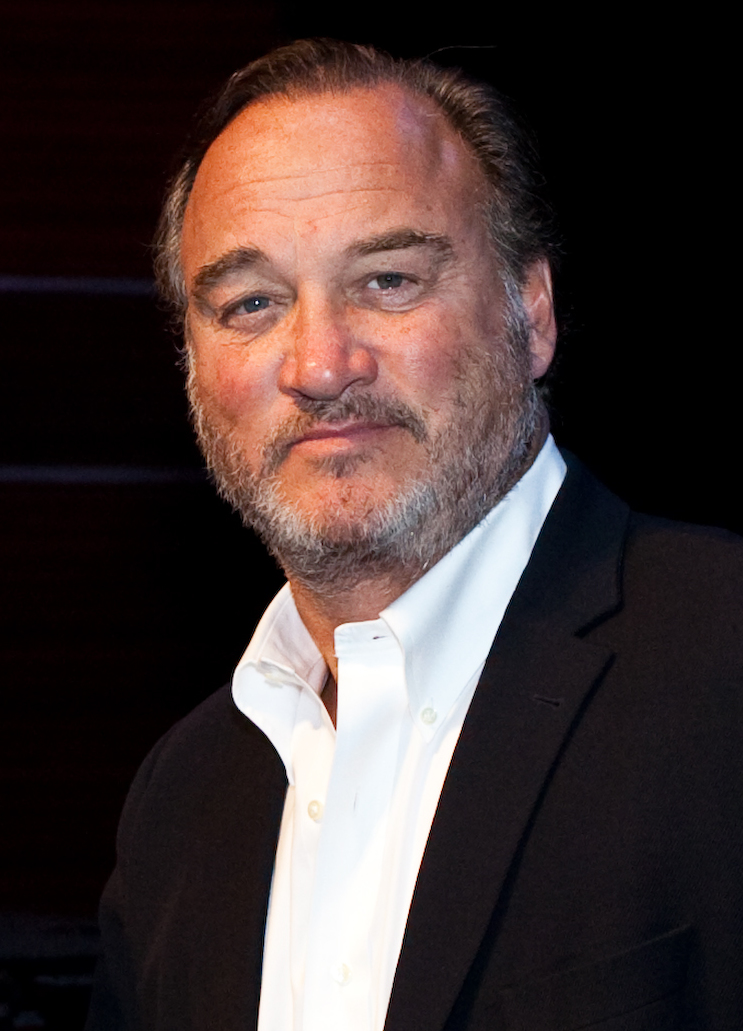
Jim Belushi
(Benny)

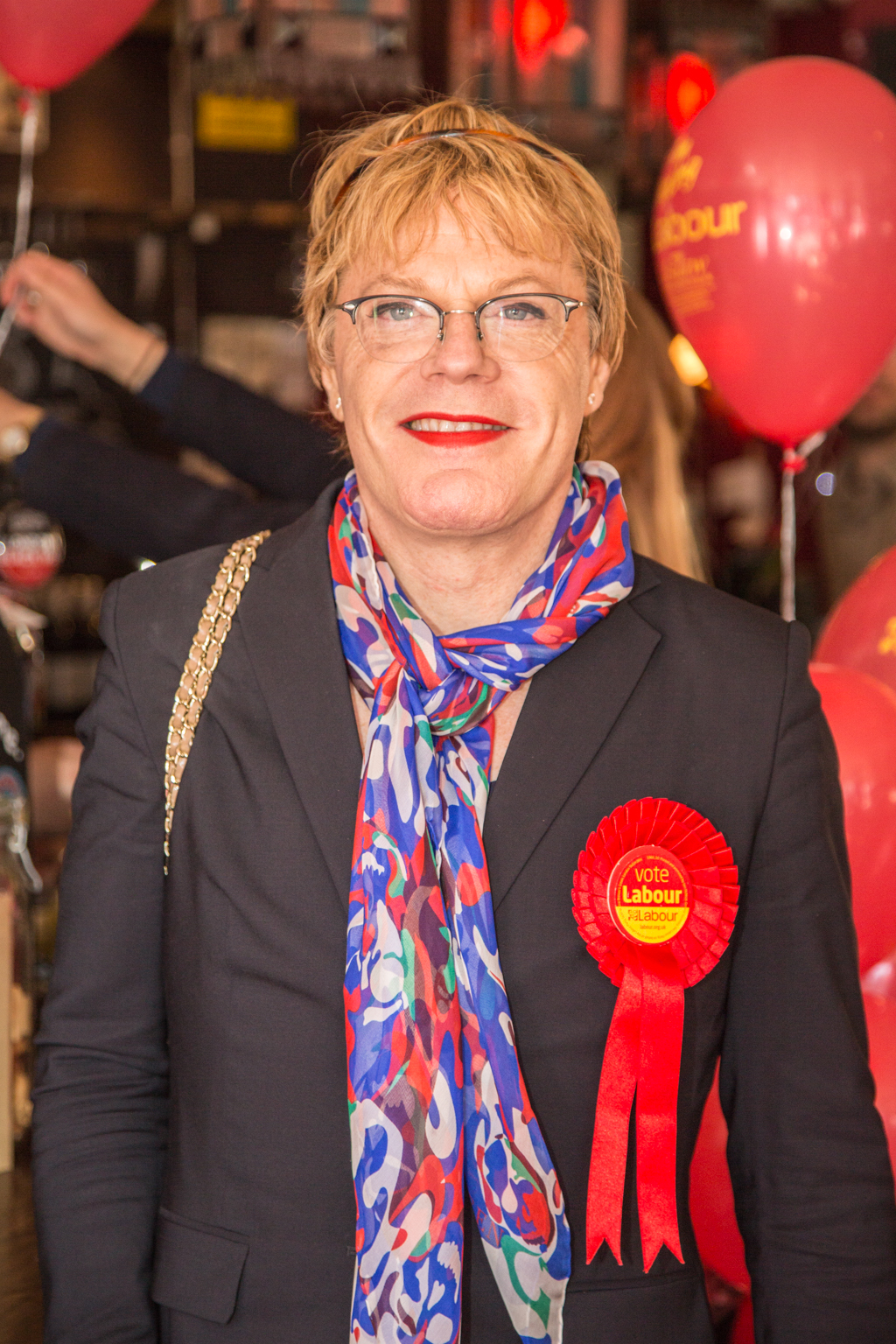
Eddie Izzard
(Nigel)

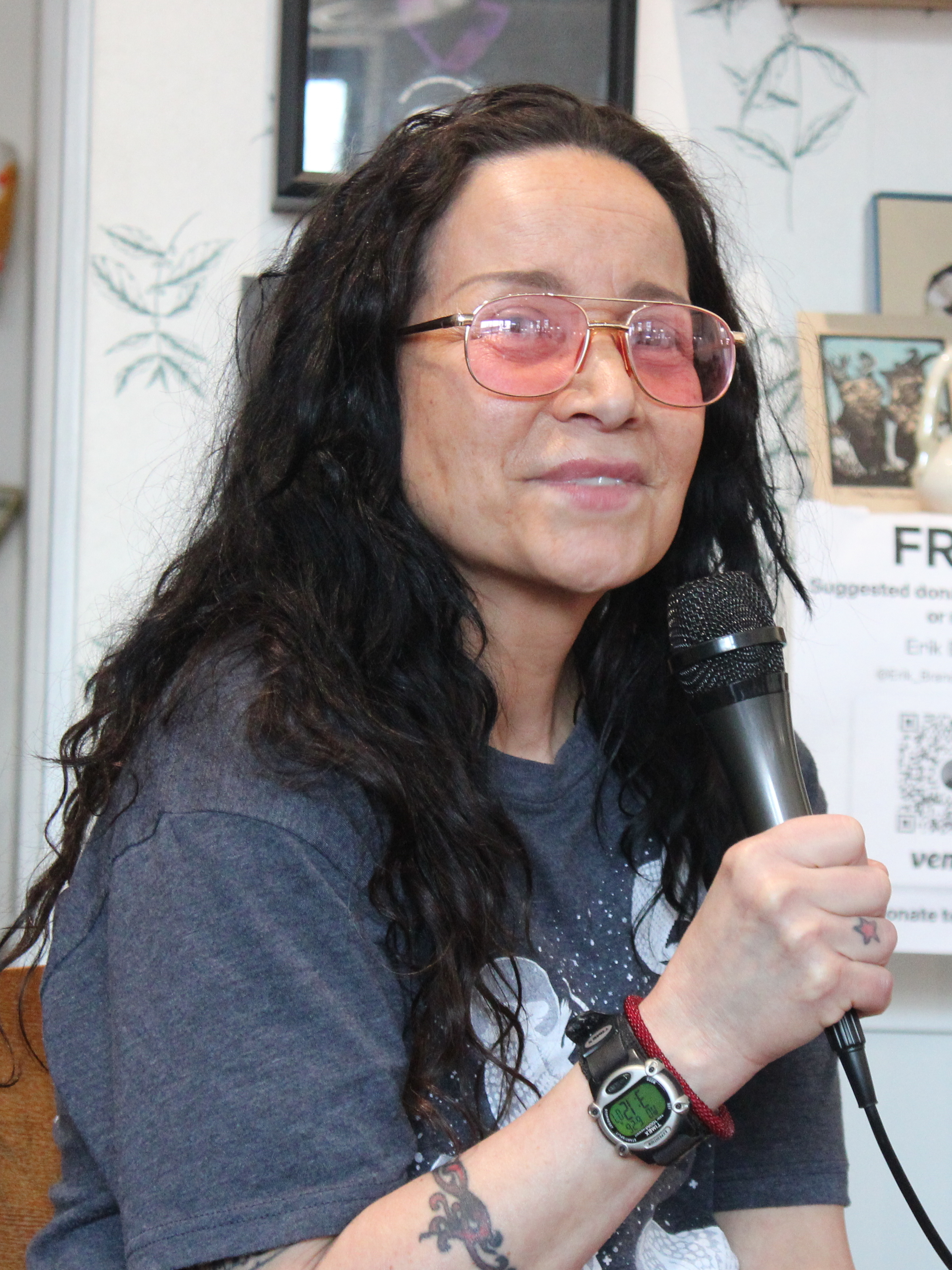
Janeane Garofalo
(Bridget)

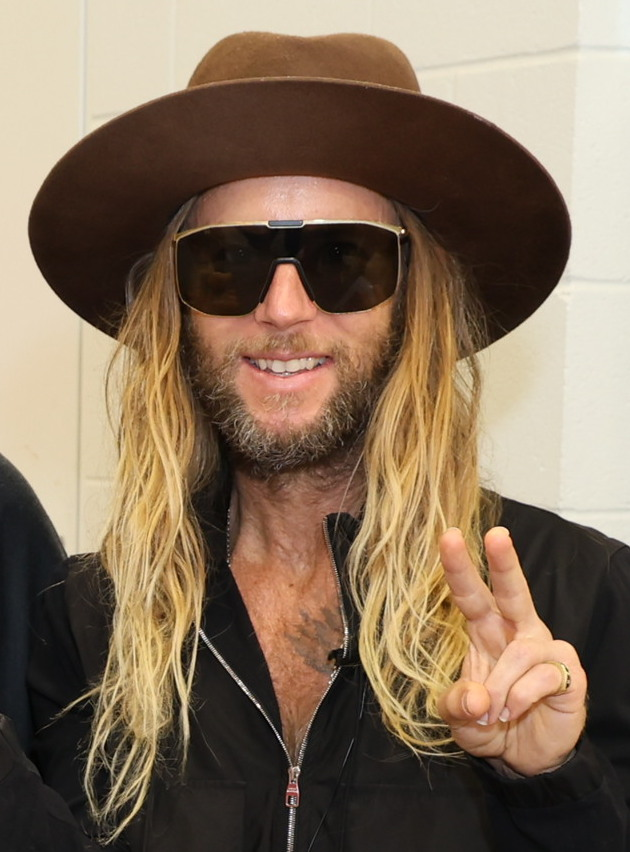
Greg Cipes
(Ryan)

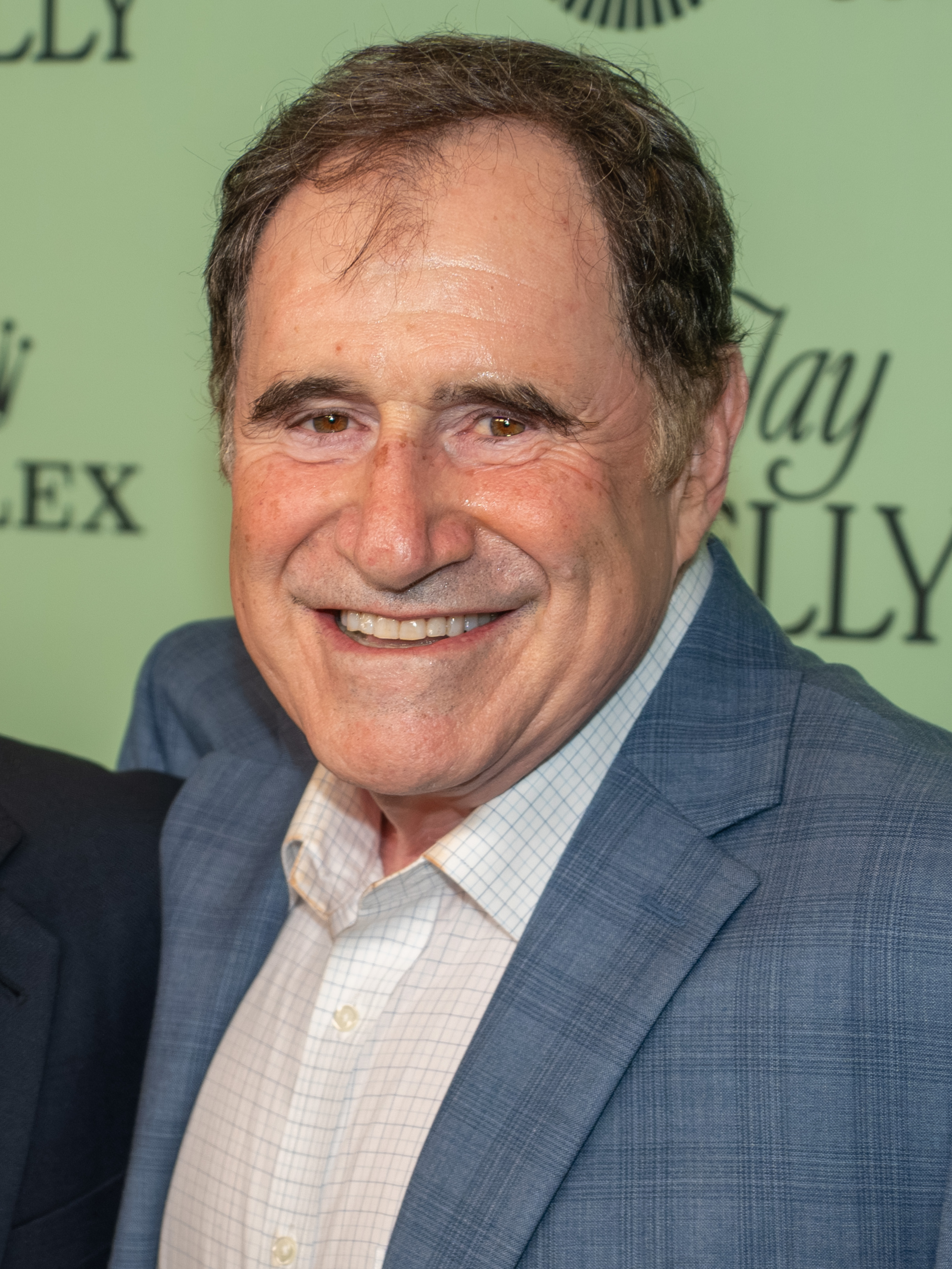
Richard Kind
(Larry)

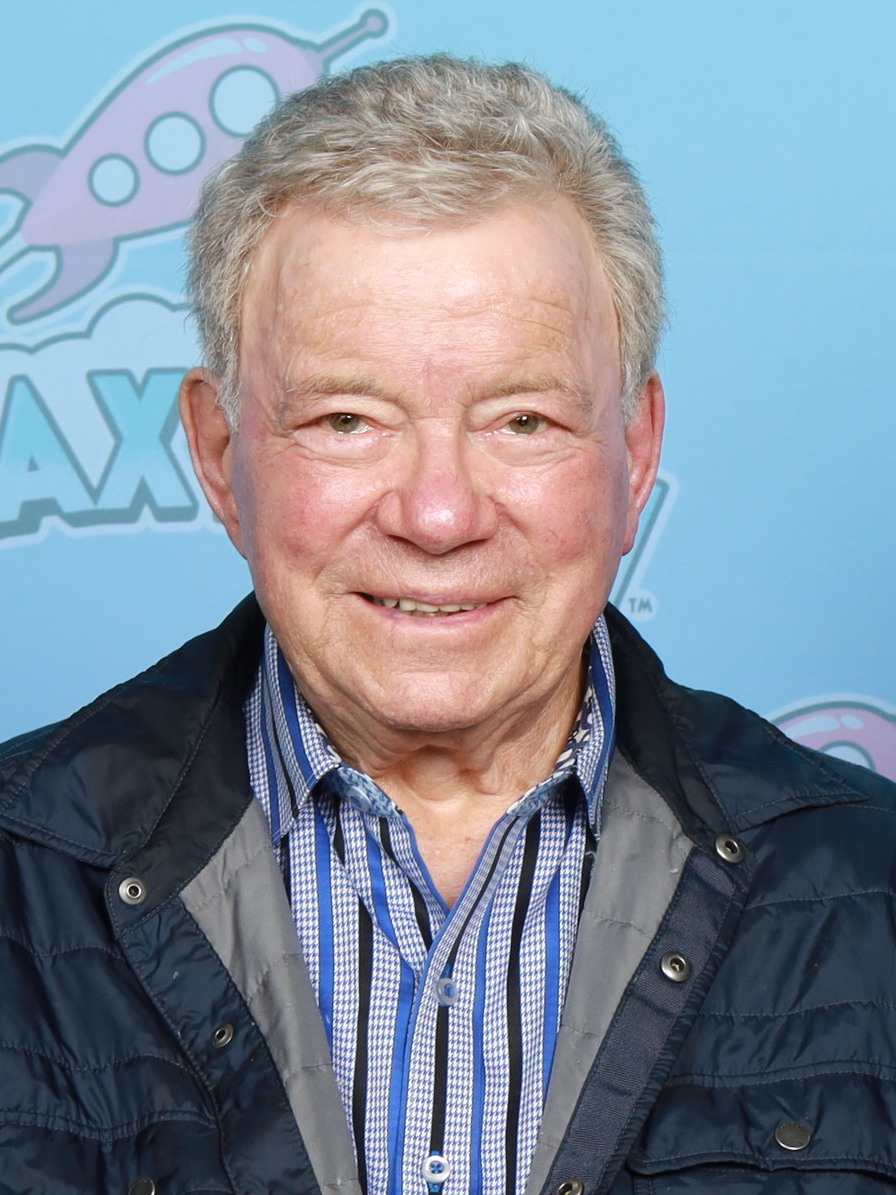
William Shatner
(Kazar)

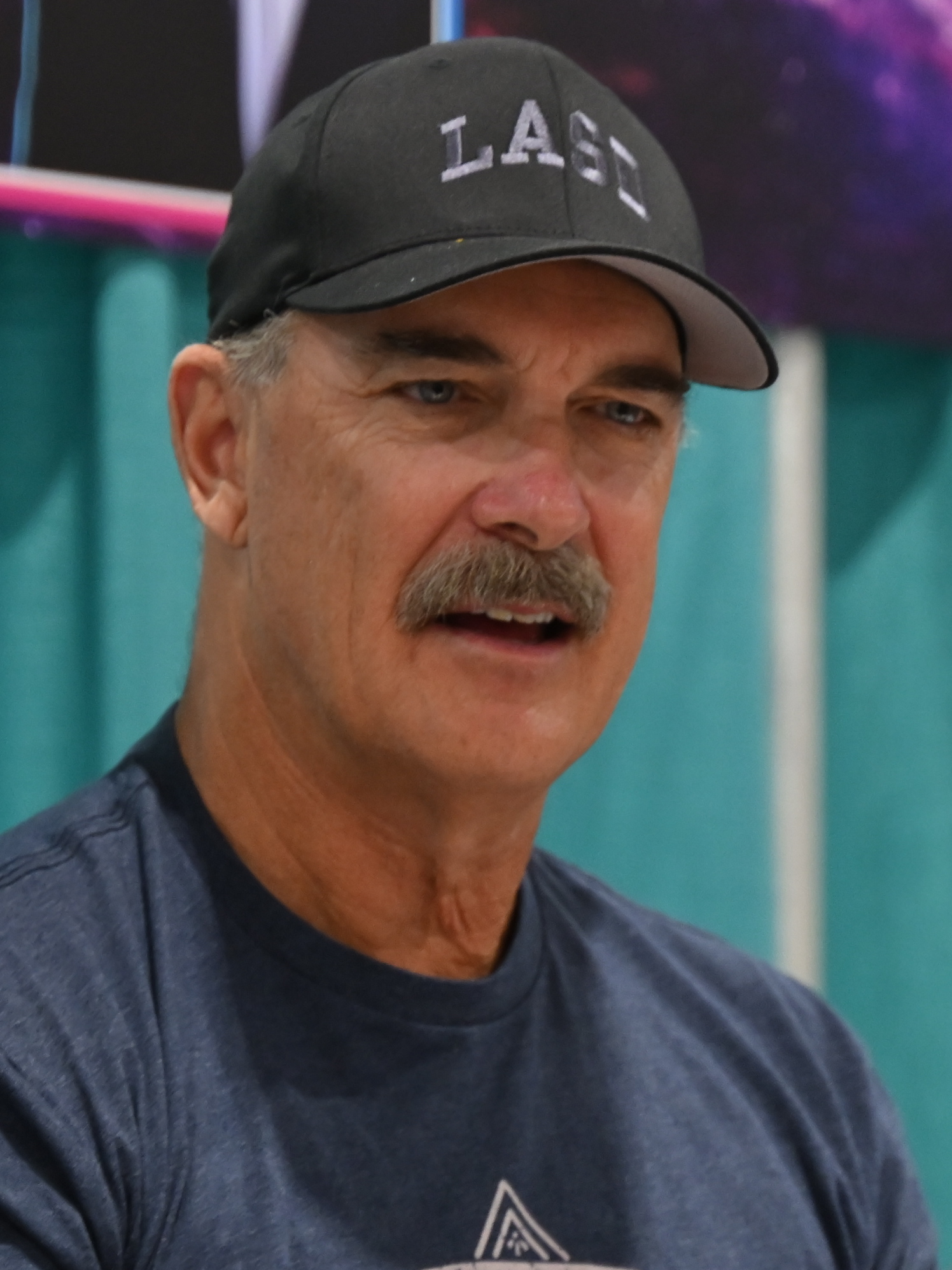
Patrick Warburton
(Blag)

In November 1998, it was reported that Walt Disney Pictures had acquired an untitled pitch from writers Mark Gibson and Philip Halprin centering on a large-scale animal escape from the Bronx Zoo for a mid-six-figure sum. Beau Flynn, Stefan Simchowitz and Jane Park who were producing the project through their company Bandeira Entertainment brought the project to Disney where executives Todd Garner and Nina Jacobson quickly acted to acquire it. By January 1999, the project was continuing development under the working titles of both The Big Break and The Great Escape at the Bronx Zoo. According to producer Clint Goldman, the concept of zoo animals escaping back into the wilderness had been kicked around at every studio since the early 1990s. During the early stages of the project's life, the film was planned to be done with claymation as a stop motion film.

Goldman met Steve Williams at Industrial Light & Magic where he worked on the special effects for The Abyss, Terminator 2: Judgment Day, Jurassic Park, and The Mask until 1996 where Goldman and Williams struck out on their own, beginning with serving as special effects supervisors on Spawn and then working as commercial directors notably on the series of Blockbuster Video advertisements featuring computer animated rabbit and guinea pig Carl and Ray respectively. The two joined the project in 2002 which was put into production by Walt Disney Pictures' live-action division rather than their animation division before the similarly themed Madagascar started development at DreamWorks Animation. Goldman and Williams encouraged a collaborative process between the animators and voice actors citing the example of Eddie Izzard's koala Nigel who was originally a minor character until a lengthy session during the recording session saw the character much more fleshed out.

The animation work began in 2003 and took two years to complete. While Madagascar beat The Wild to release, both Goldman and Williams felt the film had enough of its own identity such as going for a more photorealistic look which differentiated from a Pixar or Dreamworks film.

In a 2004 presentation by Walt Disney Animation Studios, The Wild was announced in collaboration with the San Francisco-based Complete Pandemonium and Toronto-based C.O.R.E. Digital Pictures companies. The Walt Disney Studios had invested in C.O.R.E. as an alternative to Pixar Animation Studios, whose initial deal with Disney was ending. This was the only film produced by C.O.R.E. via their C.O.R.E. Feature Animation division, prior to their closure in 2010.

== Release ==
The Wild was initially announced with an intended release in 2005, the same year as its rival Madagascar, before releasing theatrically in the United States by Buena Vista Pictures Distribution on April 14, 2006. In March 2006, for a month-long "spring break" engagement exclusive to the El Capitan Theatre, theater patrons were treated to a live performance of exotic birds which were accompanied by their keepers from the Los Angeles Zoo and Botanical Gardens before a screening of the film.

The film was released on DVD and VHS on September 12, 2006. The DVD was accompanied with a filmmakers' commentary, five deleted scenes, bloopers, and a music video of Everlife's "Real Wild Child". However, the VHS version was only an exclusive for the Disney Movie Club. On its first weekend, the film debuted at number one selling 787,779 DVD units. At the end of its initial home video release, the film earned $43.2 million. On November 21, 2006, the film was released on Blu-ray.

== Reception ==
=== Box office ===
During its opening weekend, the film grossed $9.6 million (equivalent to $15,331,793 in 2025) at the box office, ranking fourth behind Scary Movie 4, Ice Age: The Meltdown, and The Benchwarmers. The Wild grossed $37.4 million (equivalent to $59,730,109 in 2025) in the United States and $64.9 million (equivalent to $103,649,307 in 2025) in other countries for a worldwide total of $102.3 million (equivalent to $163,379,416 in 2025).

=== Critical response ===
On the review aggregation website Rotten Tomatoes, 18% of 110 critics' reviews are positive, with an average rating of 4.8/10. The website's consensus reads, "With a rehashed plot and unimpressive animation, there's nothing wild about The Wild." Metacritic, which uses a weighted average, assigned the film a score of 47 out of 100, based on 24 reviews, indicating "mixed or average" reviews. Audiences polled by CinemaScore gave the film an average grade of "B+" on an A+ to F scale.

Jonathan Rosenbaum of the Chicago Reader wrote that "The CGI characters seem less like artwork than humans wearing animal suits, but despite the overall ugliness and sitcom timing, this has enough action, violence, and invention to keep kids amused." Roger Ebert of the Chicago Sun-Times gave the film three stars out of four. He praised the film's animation, but acknowledged the film's realism ventured towards the uncanny valley. He remarked that the "framing of some of the characters is too close; they hog the foreground and obscure the background. And the fur, hair and feathers on the creatures look so detailed, thanks to the wonders of CGI, that once again we're wandering toward the Uncanny Valley."

Marc Savlov, reviewing for The Austin Chronicle, wrote "The animation is top-notch, and the film sports some of the most realistic and colorful fur, feathers, and hair this side of Fashion Week in Milan. However, The Wild feels as though much of its backstory, along with most of the good jokes, have been cut out along the circuitous path to your neighborhood cineplex, resulting in a finished film that will probably delight the under-10 set, while leaving everyone else marveling at how bored they are." Carrie Rickey of The Philadelphia Inquirer gave the film two stars out of four writing: "Though dull, there are three reasons one might want to see the film: The computer animators' ability to realistically represent animal fur is nothing short of dazzling. So detailed are the lion's mane and squirrel's tail that younger viewers could mistake it for a petting zoo."

==== Comparisons to Madagascar ====
Critics considered The Wild to be heavily derivative of the 2005 DreamWorks film Madagascar. Claudia Puig, reviewing for USA Today, suggested that The Wild was "the most wildly derivative animated movie in ages. It borrows its theme from Finding Nemo, copies elements of The Lion King and has a shockingly similar plot to Madagascar." Similarly, Justin Chang of Variety felt "Samson's rescue mission directly channels the father-son Sturm und Drang of both The Lion King and Finding Nemo, though absent the former's powerhouse dramatics or the latter's eye-popping visual splendor." In summary, he wrote that "Uninspired character animation and obnoxious banter aside, The Wild is ultimately done in by the persistent stench of been-there-seen-that."

Similarities include its setting in New York's Central Park Zoo, similar animals as characters, and the primary plot of introducing zoo animals to the wild. The name of the film and the tag line, "Start spreading the newspaper", a play on the opening line from the "Theme from New York, New York", were both used as integral plot points in Madagascar.

A few critics defended The Wild as the superior film. Michael Wilmington of the Chicago Tribune wrote "The Wild is better, mostly because it has some truly spectacular animation and because the cast is just as likable—even, in some cases, preferable." Mike Sage of the Peterborough This Week wrote "don't be mistaking this for a Madagascar rip off, when it was that sloppy DreamWorks - that only managed to make it to theaters first because of corporate espionage". Without addressing which film was the original concept, Tim Cogshell of Boxoffice Magazine simply wrote "for the adult who may very well have to experience this film, and who may have experienced Madagascar, The Wild is better. The animation is better, the jokes intended for your children are better, the jokes intended for you and not your children are much better, the songs are better, and it's more fun."

=== Accolades ===
Jen Rudin and Corbin Bronson were nominated for the Artios Award for Best Animated Voice-Over Feature Casting 2006. The film was nominated for the 2006 Stinkers Bad Movie Award for Worst Animated Film.

== Soundtrack ==
The musical score is composed by Alan Silvestri.

- "Real Wild Child" is performed by Everlife; a music video of the song is included on the DVD release of 2006. It was also included in the trailer of Wild Child.
- "Good Enough" is performed by Lifehouse
- "Clocks" is performed by Coldplay
- "Really Nice Day" is performed by Eric Idle and John Du Prez
- "Big Time Boppin' (Go Man Go)" is performed by Big Bad Voodoo Daddy
- "Lovin' You" is performed by Minnie Riperton.

The scores "Tales from the Wild", "You Can't Roar", "Lost in the City", "To the Wild", "Alien Shores", "The Legend in Action", "The Mythology of Nigel", "The Ritual", and "Found Our Roar" are among the nine score tracks on the soundtrack. The soundtrack is available from Buena Vista Records. "Free Ride" by The Edgar Winter Group & "Come Sail Away" by Styx is featured in the trailers.

The image song for the Japanese version is called "Prisoner of Love" by the Gospellers.

== Video game ==
A video game for Game Boy Advance based on the film was released to coincide with the film, with Climax Studios developing the game and Buena Vista Games publishing. Players get to play as Benny the Squirrel and Samson the Lion as they go through New York, the sea, and Africa to find Ryan, while battling the wicked blue wildebeest Kazar. The video game is "E" rated (for "Everyone") by the ESRB, with a note for Mild Cartoon Violence.

== Literature ==
- 2006: Irene Trimble: Disney the Wild Novelisation, Parragon, ISBN 1-40546-612-X
