= Gigi Does It =

- Genre: Sitcom
- Created by: David Krumholtz; Ricky Mabe; Zach Golden; Ben Newmark; Dan Newmark
- Starring: David Krumholtz; Ricky Mabe
- Country of origin: United States
- Original language: English
- No. of seasons: 1
- No. of episodes: 8

Production
- Executive producers: Ricky Mabe; Zach Golden; David Krumholtz; Tim Gibbons; Ben Newmark; Dan Newmark
- Producers: Adam Bold; Mike Lopez
- Running time: 22 minutes
- Production company: Grandma's House Entertainment

Original release
- Network: IFC
- Release: October 1 – November 16, 2015

Gigi Does It is an American sitcom that was created by David Krumholtz, Ricky Mabe, Zach Golden, Ben Newmark, and Dan Newmark, with Krumholtz playing a Jewish senior citizen (the title character) who learns she has inherited millions of dollars from her late husband. On April 28, 2015, IFC ordered the series. The series premiered on IFC on October 1, 2015. On December 5, 2015, the series was canceled by IFC.

== Cast ==
- David Krumholtz as Gigi
- Ricky Mabe as Ricky
- Lesley Ann Warren as Tretchy Feinberg

== Episodes ==
No.	Title	Original release date	Prod. code	US viewers (millions)
1	"Glock Schlock"	October 1, 2015	101	42,000
2	"Call Your Grandma"	October 8, 2015	102	20,000
3	"Wart-A-Colors"	October 15, 2015	103	67,000
4	"A Regular Kristy Yamatushy"	October 22, 2015	104	N/A
5	"Eat Something"	October 26, 2015	105	144,000
6	"Let's Get Schvitzical"	November 2, 2015	106	75,000
7	"Whine"	November 9, 2015	107	N/A
8	"Love Thyself"	November 16, 2015	108	81,000

== Reception ==
On Rotten Tomatoes, the series has an aggregate score of 29% based on 2 positive and 7 negative critic reviews.
