= You Stupid Man =

- Film poster
- Directed by: Brian Burns
- Written by: Brian Burns
- Produced by: Brian Burns; Al Munteanu; Peter Popp; Gerald Schubert
- Starring: Milla Jovovich; David Krumholtz; William Baldwin; Denise Richards; Dan Montgomery Jr. Jessica Cauffiel
- Cinematography: David Herrington
- Edited by: William Henry
- Music by: David Schwartz
- Distributed by: 01 Distribuzione mediacs AG
- Release date: October 18, 2002
- Running time: 95 minutes
- Country: United States
- Language: English

You Stupid Man is a 2002 romantic comedy film written and directed by Brian Burns and starring Milla Jovovich, David Krumholtz, William Baldwin, Denise Richards, Dan Montgomery Jr., and Jessica Cauffiel.

== Storyline ==
Owen is beginning to get over his former girlfriend, Chloe, who has recently moved to Los Angeles to become an actress. Owen finds love with another woman, Nadine, shortly before his former girlfriend's television show is canceled, and Chloe declares that she wants him back.

== Cast ==
- Milla Jovovich as Nadine
- David Krumholtz as Owen
- Denise Richards as Chloe
- Dan Montgomery Jr. as Jack
- Jessica Cauffiel as Diane
- William Baldwin as Brady
- Landy Cannon as Rodger

== Production ==
You Stupid Man was filmed in New York City and Toronto in December 2000 to January 2001. The shots of the World Trade Center remained in the film after September 11th attacks in 2001 as a tribute.

== Release ==
You Stupid Man made its premiere at The Hamptons International Film Festival on October 18, 2002.

== Reception ==
Reviewer Michael Rankins noted the plot was "while not stupid, the movie does manage to be agonizingly predictable" and had many similarities to When Harry Met Sally..., as one reviewer explained, the two characters "decided to follow [the When Harry Met Sally] story line instead of coming up with their own". Charles Tatum of eFilmCritic.com gave it 2 out of 5, a was critical of the screenplay but praised Jovovich for her performance and her "are you fucking kidding me?" look in response to Krumholtz.
