= Odd Man Out (American TV series) =

- Genre: Sitcom
- Created by: Ed Decter; John J. Strauss
- Written by: Tom J. Astle; Barton Dean; Ed Decter; Matt Ember; Michael Feldman; Mark Goffman; John Hoberg; Laura Perkins-Brittain; Alicia Sky Varinaitis; John J. Strauss; Jillian Tohber
- Directed by: Gil Junger; David Kendall; John P. Whitesell
- Starring: Erik von Detten; Trevor Fehrman; Jessica Capshaw; Natalia Cigliuti; Vicki Davis; Marina Malota; Markie Post
- Composer: Ben Decter
- Country of origin: United States
- Original language: English
- No. of seasons: 1
- No. of episodes: 13

Production
- Executive producers: Barton Dean; Ed Decter; John J. Strauss
- Producers: Jason Shubb; Craig Wyrick-Solari
- Cinematography: Richard Brown
- Editor: Steve Rasch
- Running time: 22–24 minutes
- Production companies: Frontier Pictures; Warner Bros. Television

Original release
- Network: ABC
- Release: September 24, 1999 – January 7, 2000

Odd Man Out is an American sitcom that aired on the ABC television network as a part of the TGIF lineup. It aired from September 24, 1999, to January 7, 2000. This show was created by Ed Decter and John J. Strauss.

== Synopsis ==
Set in Miami, the show revolved around 15-year-old Andrew Whitney, the only male in a house full of women. He is constantly surrounded by his three sisters (Val, Paige, and Elizabeth), Aunt Jordan, and widowed mom, Julia. The episodes mostly revolved around Andrew's lack of privacy and dealing with his best friend Keith's crush on his unresponsive older sister, Paige.

== Cast ==
- Erik von Detten as Andrew Whitney
- Trevor Fehrman as Keith Carlson, Andrew's best friend
- Jessica Capshaw as Aunt Jordan, Andrew's maternal aunt
- Natalia Cigliuti as Paige Whitney, Andrew's older sister
- Vicki Davis as Valerie "Val" Whitney, Andrew's older sister
- Marina Malota as Elizabeth Whitney, Andrew's younger sister
- Markie Post as Julia Whitney, Andrew's widowed mother

== Production ==
The show was heavily promoted in the summer of 1999, primarily as a last-ditch effort to save the faltering TGIF block, which had been in severe decline since The Walt Disney Company took over the block in 1997. ABC commercials showing teenage girls screaming "EVD!" (the initials of star Erik von Detten) were prominent; at the time, this was the peak of the boy band craze, and this was a common practice. The commercials mentioned very little about the show itself, and did not even mention the name until a few weeks before the show was to debut: a typical advertisement, following clips of girls screaming "EVD!" would follow a shadow of von Detten with a question mark and a voiceover stating "What is EVD? Find out Fridays this fall on ABC." This type of mysterious promotion did little to hold interest in the show once it debuted. The series was canceled after 13 episodes and replaced with the reality show Making the Band; it was the last new sitcom to debut on TGIF in its original form, and TGIF would itself end at the end of the season.

Von Detten would later go on to co-star in another series, Complete Savages, during a TGIF revival in 2004. That series had an opposite premise in that Von Detten was but one member of an all-male family.

== Episodes ==
No.	Title	Directed by	Written by	Original release date	Prod. code	Viewers (millions)
1	"The First Girlfriend's Club"	Gil Junger	Jillian Tohber	September 24, 1999	225851	9.18
2	"Good Will Hunting"	Gil Junger	Laura Perkins-Brittain	October 1, 1999	225852	8.73
3	"The Unbelievable Truth"	Gil Junger	Ed Decter & John J. Strauss	October 8, 1999	475328	9.99
4	"The Road to Caracas"	David Kendall	Nina de Castro	October 15, 1999	225855	8.65
5	"You've Got Female"	David Kendall	Mark Goffman	October 22, 1999	225856	7.98
6	"Batman Forever"	David Kendall	Story by : Tom J. Astle & Kristine Skeie; Teleplay by : Tom J. Astle	October 29, 1999	225858	8.11
7	"In the Name of the Father"	David Kendall	Matt Ember	November 5, 1999	225859	9.36
8	"Fight Club"	David Kendall	Alicia Sky Varinaitis	November 19, 1999	225860	8.94
9	"Great Expectations"	David Kendall	Tom J. Astle	December 3, 1999	225862	7.77
10	"Punch Line"	David Kendall	Michael Feldman	December 10, 1999	225861	7.50
11	"Little Women"	David Kendall	Michael Feldman	December 17, 1999	225857	7.17
12	"What About Bob?"	David Kendall	Matt Ember	December 24, 1999	225854	4.83
13	"My Life as a Dog"	Gil Junger	Tom J. Astle	January 7, 2000	225853	8.76
