= Slums of Beverly Hills =

The Slums of Beverly Hills
- Theatrical release poster
- Directed by: Tamara Jenkins
- Written by: Tamara Jenkins
- Produced by: Michael Nozik; Stan Wlodkowski
- Starring: Alan Arkin; Marisa Tomei; Natasha Lyonne
- Cinematography: Tom Richmond
- Edited by: Pamela Martin
- Music by: Rolfe Kent
- Production company: South Fork Pictures
- Distributed by: Fox Searchlight Pictures
- Release dates: May 21, 1998 (Cannes); August 14, 1998 (United States)
- Running time: 91 minutes
- Country: United States
- Language: English
- Budget: $5 million
- Box office: $5.5 million

Slums of Beverly Hills is a 1998 American comedy-drama film written and directed by Tamara Jenkins, and starring Natasha Lyonne, Alan Arkin, Marisa Tomei, David Krumholtz, Kevin Corrigan, Jessica Walter, and Carl Reiner. The story follows a teenage girl (Lyonne) struggling to grow up in 1976 in a lower-middle-class nomadic Jewish family that relocates every few months.

== Plot ==
In 1976, 14-year-old Vivian Abromowitz's family are penniless nomads, moving from one cheap apartment to another in Beverly Hills, so that Vivian and her two brothers can attend the city's prestigious local schools. Their father, Murray, is a divorced 65-year-old, working as an unsuccessful Oldsmobile salesman whose cars are selling poorly due in large part to the energy crisis of the time.

Vivian's wealthy uncle Mickey regularly sends the family money to help them survive. When Mickey's 29-year-old daughter Rita escapes from a rehab facility, Murray offers her shelter if Mickey will pay for a plush apartment. Vivian must babysit her adult cousin, ensuring that she attends nursing school and avoids pills and alcohol. However, Vivian has her own problems: she is curious about sex, likes a 20-something neighbor, pot dealer Eliot, has inherited her mother's ample breasts, and wants a family that does not embarrass her.

Vivian's older brother Ben aspires to a show business career. Her father appreciates the attention from his wealthy lady-friend Doris Zimmerman but resists her desire that he send his children back East to live with his ex-wife. Vivian's younger brother Rickey wishes they could live somewhere where they could have more comforts like furniture and worries about how old their father is.

Vivian and Rita are close and sometimes speak in gibberish. Vivian learns that Rita is not that serious about attending nursing school, being more interested in re-establishing contact with a man she met in rehab, and also has no idea what to do with her life. Murray attempts to cover up Rita's lack of progress at nursing school when Mickey asks for progress reports.

During a meeting between the two families, Mickey expresses frustration at having to support his brother's family, telling Murray he is "their real father" because he sends them money. Vivian snaps and stabs Mickey in the leg with a fork, and Rita admits that she is pregnant. Rita gets on a plane with her now outraged parents. Depressed and dejected, Murray once again packs the children into his car and they take off. In an attempt to cheer her father up, Vivian suggests that the family stop for a cheap steak at Sizzler for lunch—a ritual regularly suggested by their father as a means of showing affection to his children.

== Cast ==
- Alan Arkin as Murray Abromowitz, Vivian's father
- Natasha Lyonne as Vivian Abromowitz, a 14-year-old girl
- Kevin Corrigan as Eliot Arenson, Vivian's neighbor and sometime boyfriend
- Jessica Walter as Doris, Murray's new love interest
- Rita Moreno as Belle Abromowitz, Mickey's wife and Rita's mother
- David Krumholtz as Ben Abromowitz, Vivian's 18-year-old brother
- Eli Marienthal as Rickey Abromowitz, Vivian's 10-year-old brother
- Carl Reiner as Mickey Abromowitz, Murray's older brother and Rita's father
- Marisa Tomei as Rita Abromowitz, Vivian's paternal cousin
- Mena Suvari as Rachel Hoffman
- Jay Patterson as Dr. Grossman

== Production ==
The film is loosely based on writer-director Tamara Jenkins' experiences as a youth moving around different apartments in the Beverly Hills area with her lower-middle-class family. Jenkins wrote the script at the Sundance Filmmakers' Lab, where Sundance founder Robert Redford got ahold of her screenplay and expressed interest in producing it. Redford said he related to Jenkins' experiences of having "grown up as an 'outsider'...not at all a member of the club but a sideline observer from the wrong side of the tracks." Redford is credited as an executive producer on the film.

== Reception ==
=== Box office ===
Slums of Beverly Hills earned a total of $5,502,773 at the domestic box office. On its opening weekend, it garnered $125,561 from seven theaters in the United States.

=== Critical response ===
On the review aggregator website Rotten Tomatoes, 81% of 62 critics' reviews are positive, with an average rating of 7/10. The website's consensus reads: "Warm, real, and hilarious." Metacritic, which uses a weighted average, assigned the film a score of 68 out of 100, based on 22 critics, indicating "generally favorable" reviews.

Reviewers have praised the 1970s production design, the humor, and the acting as "dead-on". Roger Ebert awarded the film three out of four, and said of lead actress Natasha Lyonne, "[she] has the film's most important role, and is the key to the comedy. She does a good job of looking incredulous, and there's a lot in her life to be incredulous about. She also has a nice pragmatic approach to sexuality, as in a scene where she consults a plastic surgeon about on-the-spot breast reduction." He also stated, "...basically I enjoyed Slums of Beverly Hills—for the wisecracking, for the family squabbles, for the notion of squatters who stake a claim in a Beverly Hills where money, after all, is not the only currency". Gene Shalit on the Today Show called the film "hilarious and poignant".

San Francisco Chronicle reviewer Ruthe Stein stated, "While touching on serious issues such as loss, this coming-of-age story is first and foremost a comedy, and a hilarious one at that. It never strains to be funny. The humor derives from the deadpan responses of family members to circumstances beyond their control." She also wrote, "Set in the mid-'70s, Slums gets the period right, from the burnt orange shag carpet on the floor of the family's temporary digs to the dorky clothes and extreme hairstyles. Even the saleslady who sells Vivian her first bra has the overly made-up look of the time. The Abramowitzes' behavior when they go out to eat—complaining about the service and that there's too much salt in the food—may seem to border on a Jewish stereotype. But it's also dead-on."

=== Accolades ===
Award	Category	Recipient(s)	Result	Ref.
ALMA Awards	Outstanding Actress in a Feature Film in a Crossover Role	Rita Moreno	Nominated	
American Comedy Awards	Funniest Supporting Actress in a Motion Picture	Marisa Tomei	Nominated	
Chicago Film Critics Association Awards	Most Promising Actress	Natasha Lyonne	Nominated	
Independent Spirit Awards	Best First Feature	Tamara Jenkins, Michael Nozik, Stan Wlodkowski	Nominated	
Independent Spirit Awards	Best First Screenplay	Tamara Jenkins	Nominated	
Teen Choice Awards	Choice Movie Breakout	Natasha Lyonne	Nominated	
Teen Choice Awards	Most Funniest Scene	Scene: Natasha Lyonne and Marisa Tomei dancing with a vibrator	Nominated	
YoungStar Awards	Best Performance by a Young Actor in a Comedy Film	Eli Marienthal	Nominated	

== Soundtrack ==
- "Give Up the Funk (Tear the Roof off the Sucker)" – Parliament
- "I'd Love to Change the World" – Ten Years After
- "Shambala" – Three Dog Night
- "Up the Escalator" – Rolfe Kent
- "A Fool in Love" – Ike And Tina Turner
- "Papa Loves Mambo" – Perry Como
- "You and Your Folks, Me and My Folks" – Funkadelic
- "Measuring Up" – Rolfe Kent
- "Before the Next Teardrop Falls" – Freddie Fender
- "Luck Be a Lady" – David Krumholtz
- "Let Your Love Flow" – The Bellamy Brothers
- "Escalator" – Rolfe Kent
- "Your Perverted Arms" – Rolfe Kent
- "Rita" – Rolfe Kent
- "We're Nomads" – Rolfe Kent
