= Benny Silman =

Campus bookmaker

Benny Silman of New York City is a former student turned campus bookmaker who was jailed for masterminding a point shaving scandal at Arizona State University.

== Career ==
In 1998, Silman pleaded guilty to charges that he bribed college basketball players Stevin "Hedake" Smith and Isaac Burton to ensure the Sun Devils did not "cover the allotted spread" in four end-of-season basketball games during the 1994 season. He was sentenced to just under four years in a federal prison after pleading guilty to fixing Arizona State basketball games in exchange for money from gamblers. A total of $568,000 was wagered by professional sports handicappers on the approval of Silman.

Following his release in 2002, Silman has conducted seminars with NCAA athletes to warn them about the dangers of gambling and has written articles for such publications as Maxim magazine. Silman claims that he was coerced into perpetuating his scheme longer than planned by members of organized crime. His story was made into a movie titled Big Shot: Confessions of a Campus Bookie with David Krumholtz playing Silman.

== See also ==
- Match fixing
