= Ed Decter =

American film director, producer and screenwriter

- Born: Edward Decter; May 19, 1959 (age 67); West Orange, New Jersey, U.S.
- Education: Wesleyan University
- Occupations: Film director, film producer, screenwriter
- Years active: 1988–present

Edward Decter (born May 19, 1959) is an American film director, producer and screenwriter.

== Early life and education ==
Born in West Orange, New Jersey, Decter graduated with a Bachelor of Arts in English and Art from Wesleyan University in 1979.

== Career ==
His credits include, There's Something About Mary, The Santa Clause 2, The Santa Clause 3, The New Guy, The Lizzie McGuire Movie, and television series Boy Meets World, In Plain Sight, and Shadowhunters.

He frequently collaborates with fellow producer and writer John J. Strauss. His production company was Frontier Pictures and is now Carteret Street Productions.

== Filmography ==
=== Film ===
| Title | Year | Credited as | | | Notes |
| Title | Year | Writer | Director | Producer | Notes |
|---|---|---|---|---|---|
| Options | 1989 | Story & screenplay | No | No | |
| There's Something About Mary | 1998 | Story & screenplay | No | No | |
| Head over Heels | 2001 | Story | No | Executive producer | |
| The New Guy | 2002 | No | Yes | Executive producer | |
| The Santa Clause 2 | 2002 | Screenplay | No | No | |
| The Lizzie McGuire Movie | 2003 | Yes | No | No | |
| Rebound | 2005 | Story | No | No | |
| The Wild | 2006 | Screenplay | No | Co-producer | |
| The Santa Clause 3: The Escape Clause | 2006 | Yes | No | No | |

=== Television ===
The numbers in writing credits refer to the number of episodes.

| Title | Year | Credited as | | | Network | Notes |
| Title | Year | Creator | Writer | Executive Producer | Network | Notes |
|---|---|---|---|---|---|---|
| Riptide | 1984 | No | Yes (1) | No | NBC | |
| The Adventures of Mark & Brian | 1991–92 | Yes | Yes (3) | No | NBC | Supervising producer |
| Boy Meets World | 1993–94 | No | Yes (4) | No | ABC | Co-executive producer (2 episodes) |
| Me and the Boys | 1994–95 | No | Yes (2) | No | ABC | Co-executive producer (2 episodes) |
| Too Something | 1996 | No | Yes (2) | No | Fox | Co-executive producer (Pilot) |
| Chicago Sons | 1997 | Yes | Yes (1) | Yes | NBC | |
| The Closer | 1998 | Yes | Yes (1) | Yes | CBS | |
| Odd Man Out | 1999–2000 | Yes | Yes (1) | Yes | ABC | |
| Worst Week of My Life | 2006 | Yes | Yes | Yes | Fox | Unaired pilot |
| Backyards & Bullets | 2007 | Yes | Yes | Yes | NBC | Unaired pilot |
| In Plain Sight | 2011–12 | No | Yes (2) | Yes | USA Network | |
| Big Mike | 2011 | Yes | Yes | Yes | A&E | Unaired pilot |
| The Client List | 2012–13 | No | Yes (2) | Yes | Lifetime | |
| Helix | 2014 | No | Yes (1) | No | Syfy | Executive consultant (9 episodes); Consulting producer (4 episodes) |
| Unforgettable | 2014 | No | Yes (2) | Yes | CBS | Executive producer (season 3) |
| Shadowhunters | 2016–19 | Developer | Yes (2) | Yes | Freeform | Executive producer (season 1) |
| Shelter | TBA† | Yes | No | Yes | Amazon Prime Video | |

Key
| † | Denotes television series that have not yet been aired |
