= John J. Strauss =

American screenwriter and film producer

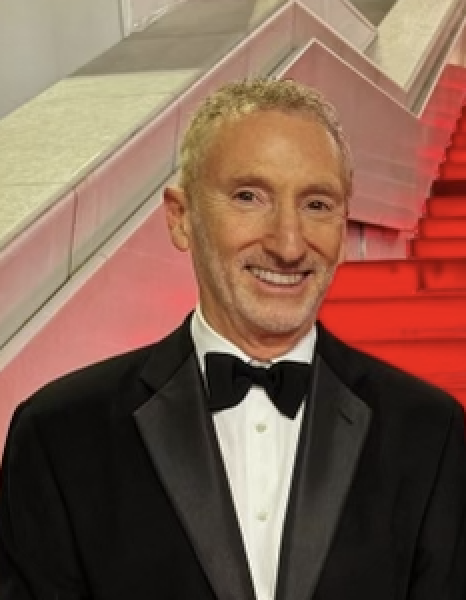
- Strauss at the 2024 Cannes Film Festival
- Born: John J. Strauss; Los Angeles, California, U.S.
- Education: UCLA (B.F.A.), University of Georgia (M.F.A.)
- Occupations: Producer, Screenwriter
- Years active: 1989–present

John J. Strauss is an American producer and writer of film and television. He has written a variety of films across numerous genres - animation, drama, comedy, and more. He is best known for writing There's Something About Mary (1998), The Lizzie McGuire Movie (2003), and The Santa Clause 2 (2002).

Strauss has written and produced for the television series Boy Meets World, is known as the writer who came up with the character name for Topanga Lawrence (naming her after Topanga Canyon). Strauss is also known for his appearances on The Howard Stern Show, where he cast Eric the Actor on an episode of In Plain Sight (2011).

He has been the showrunner on over ten different television series including Mozart in the Jungle (2014), which received a Golden Globe Award nomination for "Best TV Series Comedy" in 2015, and the Peabody Award-Winning series David Makes Man (2019).

== Early life and education ==
Strauss was born in Los Angeles California to Renee and John Strauss. His father, John Strauss, was a veteran publicist who worked for Warner Bros. and Columbia Pictures before establishing his own public relations agency. His father represented some of the largest names in the entertainment industry including Jimmy Stewart, Andy Williams, Carol Burnett, and Lucille Ball. Strauss was raised in Sherman Oaks, California.

Strauss graduated from the University of California, Los Angeles, where he received a B.F.A. degree in Motion Picture (Film) and TV. He later received an M.F.A. in Film, Television, and Media Studies from The University of Georgia.

== Career ==
Since 1998, Strauss has mainly focused on films, co-writing the screenplays for There's Something About Mary (1998), Head Over Heels (2001), The Santa Clause 2 (2002), The Lizzie McGuire Movie (2003), Rebound (2005), The Wild (2006), The Santa Clause 3: The Escape Clause (2006), You Again (2010). and Free Birds (2013).

He is also credited on Me and the Boys and Odd Man Out.

He frequently collaborates with fellow producer and writer Ed Decter. He, along with Decter replaced Barry Kemp as showrunner of the CBS Tom Selleck comedy The Closer, which eventually came out in 1998.

In 2011, while serving as the executive producer for In Plain Sight, Strauss made multiple appearances on The Howard Stern Show, where he negotiated on-the-air with Eric the Actor to cast Eric in an episode of the series. Eric played a disgruntled landlord during a story involving the FBI investigating a hoarder. Eric ad-libbed the line "Keys, woman" when the script called for him to hold the keys himself—something his disability made difficult due to his deformed hands.

His most recent credits include serving as the executive producer for VH1's The Breaks (2017), the Golden Globe-winning series Mozart in the Jungle (2014), and for Peabody Award-Winning best drama series David Makes Man (2019-2021), with Academy Award winner Tarell McCraney (Moonlight), for Warner Brothers Television and the OWN Network.
