= The Santa Clause (franchise) =

American film series and media franchise

- Film trilogy logo
- Starring: Tim Allen; Judge Reinhold; Wendy Crewson; Eric Lloyd; Elizabeth Mitchell; Liliana Mumy; (See detailed list below)
- Distributed by: Buena Vista Pictures Distribution (films); Disney+ (The Santa Clauses)
- Running time: 67+ minutes
- Country: United States
- Language: English
- Budget: >$99 million
- Box office: $470 million

The Santa Clause is a media franchise that consists of three American holiday family-comedy theatrical feature films starring Tim Allen, and one television series for Disney+. Based on an original story by Leo Benvenuti and Steve Rudnick, the plot centers around Scott Calvin, a marketing executive from Illinois who takes on the role of Santa Claus after he inadvertently causes an accident with the real one. The plot of each installment revolves around Scott as he adjusts to his new role while saving Christmas.

The Santa Clause was met with mixed-to-positive critical reviews, and was a box office success. In the years since its release, it has been described as a Christmas classic. The sequels experienced diminishing critical reception, but were financially successful and are considered holiday cult classics.

The franchise continued with a television series, The Santa Clauses, which premiered on November 16, 2022.

== Films ==
Title	U.S. release date	Director	Screenwriters	Story by	Producers
The Santa Clause	November 11, 1991	John Pasquin	Leo Benvenuti & Steve Rudnick		Robert Newmyer, Brian Reilly and Jeffrey Silver
The Santa Clause 2	November 1, 1994	Michael Lembeck	Don Rhymer and Cinco Paul & Ken Daurio and Ed Decter & John J. Strauss	Leo Benvenuti & Steve Rudnick	Robert Newmyer, Brian Reilly and Jeffrey Silver
The Santa Clause 3: The Escape Clause	November 3, 1998	Michael Lembeck	Ed Decter & John J. Strauss		Robert Newmyer, Brian Reilly and Jeffrey Silver

=== The Santa Clause (1991) ===
Divorced dad Scott Calvin (Tim Allen) has custody of his son Charlie (Eric Lloyd) on Christmas Eve. After he accidentally causes Santa to fall from his roof, they are magically transported to the North Pole, where an elf explains that Scott must take Santa's place before the next Christmas arrives. Scott thinks he is dreaming, but over the next several months he gains weight and grows an inexplicably white beard. Realizing that it was not a dream, Scott embraces the new, permanent role he has as Santa Claus.

=== The Santa Clause 2 (1994) ===
Scott Calvin (Tim Allen) has been in the role of Santa for the past eight years, and his loyal elves consider him the best one ever. But the world of the "Merry Old Soul" turns upside down when he is dealt a double whammy of news: Not only has his son, Charlie (Eric Lloyd), landed on this year's naughty list, but Scott discovers that he must marry by Christmas Eve, or he will stop being Santa Claus forever.

=== The Santa Clause 3: The Escape Clause (1998) ===
Christmas cheer turns into holiday chaos when Scott Calvin / Santa Claus (Tim Allen) invites his in-laws (Ann-Margret, Alan Arkin) for a visit and must also contend with Jack Frost's (Martin Short) scheme to take over the North Pole. Scott, his family, and Head Elf Curtis (Spencer Breslin) must join forces to foil the nefarious plot.

== Short film ==
=== True Confessions of the Legendary Figures (2003) ===
Released on The Santa Clause 2 home media, the 3 minutes 30 second short film is a mockumentary interview with Father Time, Easter Bunny, Tooth Fairy, Cupid, Sandman and Mother Nature. The actors reprised their roles from the film.

== Television series ==
In January 2022, it was announced that a sequel limited series was in development. Jack Burditt will serve as showrunner and executive producer, while Tim Allen and Elizabeth Mitchell will reprise their roles as Scott Calvin / Santa Clause and Carol Newman-Calvin / Mrs. Claus, respectively. Allen, Kevin Hench, Richard Baker and Rick Messina will serve as additional executive producers. The project will be a joint-venture production between Disney Branded Television, 20th Television, Disney Television Studios and Disney+ Original Series. The show is intended to be released via streaming exclusively on Disney+. Production is scheduled to commence in March 2022 in Los Angeles, California. At the beginning of that month, Jason Winer was announced as the director.

The official premise of the series was announced as:

Scott Calvin is on the brink of his 65th birthday and realizing that he can't be Santa forever. He's starting to lose a step in his Santa duties, and more importantly, he's got a family who could benefit from a life in the normal world, especially his two kids who have grown up at the Pole. With a lot of elves, children, and family to please, Scott sets out to find a suitable replacement Santa while preparing his family for a new adventure in a life south of the pole.

In March 2022, Kal Penn was cast in the series as a character named Simon Choski, who becomes Scott Calvin's successor as Santa Claus. The Santa Clauses was renewed for a second season on December 14, 2022, with Tim Allen and Elizabeth Mitchell set to return.

== Main cast and characters ==
List indicators

This section includes characters who will appear or have appeared in more than two films in the series.

- An empty grey cell indicates the character was not in the film, or that the character's official presence has not yet been confirmed.
- ^{A} indicates an appearance through archival footage or audio.
- ^{C} indicates a cameo role.
- ^{G} indicates a guest appearance in the season.
- ^{R} indicates a recurring role in the season.
- ^{U} indicates an uncredited appearance.
- ^{V} indicates a voice-only role.

Character	Film series			Television series	
Character	The Santa Clause	The Santa Clause 2	The Santa Clause 3: The Escape Clause	The Santa Clauses	
Character	The Santa Clause	The Santa Clause 2	The Santa Clause 3: The Escape Clause	Season 1	Season 2
Character	1994	2002	2006	2022	2023
Scott Calvin / Santa Claus	Tim Allen	Tim Allen	Tim Allen	Tim Allen	Tim Allen
Toy Santa		Tim Allen			
Charlie Calvin	Eric Lloyd	Eric Lloyd	Eric Lloyd	Eric Lloyd^{G}	
Neil Miller	Judge Reinhold	Judge Reinhold	Judge Reinhold		
Laura Miller	Wendy Crewson	Wendy Crewson	Wendy Crewson		
Bernard the Elf	David Krumholtz	David Krumholtz		David Krumholtz^{G}	
Mr. Whittle	Peter Boyle				
Detective Nunzio	Larry Brandenburg				
Mrs. Daniels	Mary Gross				
Judy the Elf	Paige Tamada				
Comet the Reindeer	Frank Welker^{V}	Bob Bergen^{V}	Bob Bergen^{V}	Silent	Silent
Falling Santa / Santa 17	Steve Lucescu^{U}		Steve Lucescu^{A}^{U}	Jim O'Heir^{G}	
Sara	Melissa King			Casey Wilson^{G}	
Kris Moreno / Kris Kringle	Uncredited child actor^{C}				Gabriel Iglesias
Carol Newman-Calvin / Mrs. Claus		Elizabeth Mitchell	Elizabeth Mitchell	Elizabeth Mitchell	Elizabeth Mitchell
Curtis the Elf		Spencer Breslin	Spencer Breslin		
Lucy Miller		Liliana Mumy	Liliana Mumy		
Mother Nature		Aisha Tyler	Aisha Tyler		
Father Time		Peter Boyle	Peter Boyle		
Easter Bunny		Jay Thomas	Jay Thomas		Tracy Morgan^{G}^{C}
Cupid		Kevin Pollak	Kevin Pollak		Kevin Pollak^{G}
Tooth Fairy		Art LaFleur	Art LaFleur		
Sandman		Michael Dorn	Michael Dorn		Michael Dorn^{G}
Jack Frost			Martin Short		
Bud Newman			Alan Arkin		
Sylvia Newman			Ann-Margret		
Buddy "Cal" Calvin			Uncredited baby actor^{C}	Austin Kane	Austin Kane
Simon Choksi				Kal Penn	
Sandra Calvin				Elizabeth Allen-Dick	Elizabeth Allen-Dick
Grace Choksi				Rupali Redd	
Betty				Matilda Lawler	Matilda Lawler^{R}
Noel				Devin Bright	Devin Bright
La Befana, the Christmas Witch				Laura San Giacomo^{R}	Laura San Giacomo^{R}
Riley				Ruby Jay^{R}	Ruby Jay^{R}
Magnus Antas / Mad Santa					Eric Stonestreet
Olga					Marta Kessler^{R}

== Additional crew and production details ==
Title	Composer	Cinematographer	Editor	Production companies	Distributing company	Running time
The Santa Clause	Michael Convertino	Walt Lloyd	Larry Bock	Walt Disney Pictures; Hollywood Pictures; Outlaw Productions	Buena Vista Pictures Distribution	97 minutes
The Santa Clause 2	George S. Clinton	Adam Greenberg	David Finfer	Walt Disney Pictures; Boxing Cat Films; Outlaw Productions	Buena Vista Pictures Distribution	104 minutes
The Santa Clause 3: The Escape Clause	George S. Clinton	Robbie Greenberg	David Finfer	Walt Disney Pictures; Boxing Cat Films; Outlaw Productions	Buena Vista Pictures Distribution	92 minutes
The Santa Clauses	Ariel Rechtshaid	J.P. Wakayama	Arge O'Neal; Christine Kim; Dean Pollack	20th Television; Small Dog Picture Company; Double Wide Productions	Disney Platform Distribution	196 minutes

== Reception ==
=== Box office performance ===
Film	Revenue			Budget	Ref.
Film	U.S. and Canada	Other territories	Worldwide	Budget	Ref.
The Santa Clause	$145,539,357	$45,000,000	$190,539,357	$22,000,000	
The Santa Clause 2	$139,236,327	$33,618,738	$172,855,065	$65,000,000	
The Santa Clause 3: The Escape Clause	$84,500,122	$26,268,000	$110,768,122	>$12,000,000 (Note: $12 million is the art department budget, not the full budget.)	
Totals	$369,275,806	$104,886,738	$474,162,544	>$99,000,000	

The Santa Clause 2 on its opening weekend grossed $10 million more than its predecessor. The opening weekend was a personal best to date for Tim Allen. The Hollywood Reporter said its performance "exceeded expectations". The Santa Clause's strongest market outside the United States was Germany, and The Santa Clause 2 had in Germany an opening weekend of $892,000, which was 50% larger than the opening weekend of the original film.

In the United States, The Santa Clause 3 had an opening weekend of $19.5 million, which was less than the $29 million grossed by The Santa Clause 2. Box Office Mojo reported: "More often than not, second sequels in the family genre make significantly less than their predecessors". After 24 days in theaters, the third film had grossed $67.1 million, which Box Office Mojo said was "lagging behind its predecessors by a wide margin".

In the United Kingdom, The Santa Clause 3 had an opening weekend of $2.7 million at 350 locations, which was 40% better than the opening weekend of The Santa Clause 2. In Mexico, The Santa Clause 3 had an opening weekend of $1.4 million at 380 locations, which was three times better than The Santa Clause 2's opening weekend.

=== Critical and public response ===
Title	Season	Critical		Public
Title	Season	Rotten Tomatoes	Metacritic	CinemaScore
The Santa Clause	–	73% (59 reviews)	57 (13 reviews)	A−
The Santa Clause 2	–	56% (122 reviews)	48 (26 reviews)	A
The Santa Clause 3: The Escape Clause	–	17% (66 reviews)	32 (17 reviews)	B+
The Santa Clauses	1	57% (21 reviews)	55 (6 reviews)	—N/a
The Santa Clauses	2	—N/a	—N/a	—N/a

Scott Foundas of Variety called the 1994 film "a full-on charmer pic". Foundas said the 2002 follow-up had too many writers and executives involved during the long development process, which he said led to "systematically pulverizing most of the original's simple delights". The critic said: "The Santa Clause 2 is a movie conscious, at every waking moment, of trying to out-do its predecessor". Variety's Justin Chang said The Santa Clause 3 was "a much cleaner, more streamlined ride than its overstuffed predecessor". Chang said: "Michael Lembeck directs the action with a surer touch and more consistent tone than he brought to Santa Clause 2, and effortlessly pulls off the pic's sentimental, life-affirming moments without tugging too hard".

== See also ==
- List of Christmas films
- Santa Claus in film
