= The Santa Clauses =

2022 American television series

- Season 1 promotional poster
- Genre: Christmas; Fantasy comedy
- Created by: Jack Burditt
- Based on: The Santa Clause by Leo Benvenuti; Steve Rudnick
- Showrunner: Jack Burditt
- Starring: Tim Allen; Elizabeth Mitchell; Austin Kane; Elizabeth Allen-Dick; Matilda Lawler; Devin Bright; Rupali Redd; Kal Penn; Gabriel "Fluffy" Iglesias; Eric Stonestreet
- Music by: Ariel Rechtshaid; Will Canzoneri
- Country of origin: United States
- Original language: English
- No. of seasons: 2
- No. of episodes: 12

Production
- Executive producers: Jack Burditt; Tim Allen; Jason Winer; Jon Radler; Rick Messina; Richard Baker; Kevin Hench
- Cinematography: JP Wakayama
- Editors: Arge O'Neal; Christine Kim; Dean Pollack; Daedra Carline
- Running time: 33 minutes
- Production companies: Double Wide Productions; Small Dog Picture Company; 20th Television

Original release
- Network: Disney+
- Release: November 16, 2022 – December 6, 2023

The Santa Clauses is an American Christmas fantasy comedy television series created by Jack Burditt for Disney+ and based on The Santa Clause film series. Serving as a sequel to The Santa Clause 3: The Escape Clause (2006), Tim Allen, Elizabeth Mitchell, Eric Lloyd, and David Krumholtz all reprise their roles from the film series. Burditt serves as showrunner and executive producer. It premiered on November 16, 2022. In December 2022, The Santa Clauses was renewed for a second season which premiered with two episodes on November 8, 2023.

== Plot ==
The series follows Scott Calvin, a former businessman who became Santa Claus in 1994, his wife Carol Calvin/Mrs. Claus, and their children Buddy "Cal" Calvin-Claus and Sandra Calvin-Claus. Scott Calvin, having served as Santa Claus for almost 30 years, believes that he is losing his magical abilities due to age and decides to choose a successor and retire.

== Cast and characters ==
=== Main ===
- Tim Allen as Scott Calvin / Santa Claus: A former successful businessman who became Santa Claus in 1994 and chose to remain in the role out of the goodness of his heart. After almost thirty years, Calvin believes that he is losing his magical abilities due to aging and chooses to retire after choosing a successor. He is revealed to be the first human to take up the mantle of Santa Claus after the army of previous Santa Clauses determined that the world needed someone who would be familiar with the development of technology. Liam Seja portrays Calvin as a child during a flashback sequence.
- Elizabeth Mitchell as Carol Calvin / Mrs. Claus: Calvin's wife, whom he married during The Santa Clause 2. Unhappy with her lack of purpose as Mrs. Claus, Carol is receptive to her husband's decision to retire. Finding success once again in her role as a school principal when they move out of the North Pole, she begins to believe that Calvin's decision was best for the entire family.
- Austin Kane as Buddy "Cal" Calvin-Claus, Scott's and Carol's son. Cal at first is excited to experience life in his own way, having become distraught and fearful at the prospect of succeeding his father. Over the course of the series, it is revealed that he possesses magical abilities due to being born in the North Pole and the spirit of Christmas. The character first appeared in The Santa Clause 3: The Escape Clause, where he was named Buddy after his maternal grandfather Bud Newman.
- Elizabeth Allen-Dick as Sandra Calvin-Claus: Scott and Carol's daughter and youngest child. Sandra enjoys living at the North Pole and is hesitant to move away when her father decides to retire. She often develops close friendships with animals. Over the course of the series, it is revealed that she has magical abilities that she inherited from Santa Claus and the spirit of Christmas.
- Matilda Lawler as Betty (season 1; recurring: season 2): Chief of Staff at the North Pole, and Noel's wife. She later is forced to vacate her position and appoint Noel in her place due to the Kribble Krabble Clause, but returns due to the threat of the Mad Santa.
- Devin Bright as Noel: The current right-hand elf at the North Pole, Betty's husband, and one of Santa's best friends. He becomes the new head elf in the second season when Betty goes on Kribble Krabble.
- Rupali Redd as Grace Choksi (season 1): Simon's kind-hearted daughter, who believes in the spirit of Christmas. Grace is excited to live at the North Pole and experience the joys of Christmas every day. Her mother expressed desires for the feelings of Christmas every day, prior to passing from a major illness.
- Kal Penn as Simon Choksi / Santa Claus (season 1): The man that Scott Calvin chooses to be his successor as Santa Claus at the North Pole. Prior to his new role, Choski is a game inventor, product developer, and single father with aspirations to become the equivalent of "the next Jeff Bezos" in the technology world. When he is appointed as the next Santa Claus, he views the efficiency at the North Pole as an opportunity to realize his unsuccessful business aspirations. Leading in his new role forcefully, Simon determines that every day will be Christmas, providing the world with instant gratification through a combination of his business technology and the North Pole's magic. Over time, however, he becomes disillusioned and bitter with his new role, and indifferent to the survival of the North Pole. As the spirit of Christmas begins to fade, Choksi finds himself at odds with Calvin who returns to reclaim his role as Santa Claus.
- Gabriel "Fluffy" Iglesias as Kris Moreno / Kris Kringle (season 2), the head of failing theme park Santapolis who accidentally frees Magnus Antas. He is later revealed to be the kid, now all grown-up, that Scott delivered a kayak to during his first night as Santa.
- Eric Stonestreet as Magnus Antas / The Mad Santa (season 2), a rogue past Santa Claus who was overthrown by the elves and imprisoned in a nutcracker by La Befana. Accidentally freed by Kris, Magnus works with him and uses his magic to revitalize Santapolis while seeking to take over the North Pole and become the one true Santa.

=== Recurring ===
- Isabella Bennett as Edie: An elf at the North Pole who regularly reviews the List with Santa, to ensure that good children receive what they want on Christmas. Edie is an advocate for the naughty children as well.
- Sasha Knight as Crouton: An elf at the North Pole who assists Santa.
- Izaac Wang as Hugo: An elf at the North Pole who helps run the machinery that monitors Santa Claus while he makes his deliveries on Christmas Eve.
- Miya Cech as Doc Martin: An elf doctor who helps manage Santa's health problems.
- Laura San Giacomo as La Befana: The good-natured Italian folkloric holiday figure, known as the Christmas witch, who lives in the Wobbly Woods. In the second season, she becomes a mentor for Sandra, and was revealed to be a former member of the Council of Legendary Figures.
- Liam Kyle as Gary, an elf in charge of the E.L.F.S. (Effective Liberating Flight Squad).
- Ruby Jay as Riley: Cal Calvin's supportive first girlfriend. The pair first meet when the Calvin family moves to Chicago, and though Cal is an outsider at school, Riley immediately takes a liking to him.
- Marta Kessler as Olga (season 2): A gnome who sides with Magnus.

=== Guest stars ===
- Eric Lloyd (Note: Credited as a special guest star.) as Charlie Calvin, Scott's oldest son from his previous marriage. Though he expressed interest in following in his father's footsteps as a child, he now states that his current job and young family prevent him from being able to be the successor when his father chooses to retire.
- Peyton Manning as himself, a potential candidate for a replacement Santa.
- David Krumholtz as Bernard: The former right-hand elf to Calvin as Santa, who's revealed to have served in the role for thousands of years with the previous figures who held the mantle of Santa Claus, before briefly retiring to marry Vanessa Redgrave.
- Mitch Poulos as Saint Nicholas of Myra: The historical figure who served as inspiration for the legend of Santa Claus. Through his benevolent good acts of kindness and example in the spirit of giving, the spirit of Christmas created magic that resulted in the creation of ethereal figures including the role of Santa, elves, and flying reindeer.
- Mauricio Mendoza as Papa Noel / Santa Claus: One of the ancient successors to St. Nicholas, a Frenchman who carried the mantle for a time and completed his role as Santa Claus.
- Dirk Rogers as Krampus: The ancient folklore anthropomorphic horned being, who served during the Dark Ages as the successor to St. Nicholas; known for his role in scaring children into behaving for their parents. In the series, Krampus is shown to be stealing toys from children on the naughty list.
- Jim O'Heir as Santa Claus XVII: Calvin's predecessor and the seventeenth successor to Saint Nicholas, referred to amongst the various previous holders of the Santa Claus mantle as number "17". This man acted in the role of Santa for decades, from the Great Depression to the night that Scott Calvin became Santa Claus. He chose Scott after interacting with him as a child one night on Christmas Eve. Previously thought to have randomly died after falling off Scott's roof in the 1990s, it is revealed that he retired to the afterlife after choosing his successor correctly. O'Heir takes over the role from Steve Lucescu, who appeared in The Santa Clause and The Santa Clause 3: The Escape Clause.
- Casey Wilson as Sara: Now fully grown, she was once the little girl Scott first encountered as Santa in the first film. Wilson replaces Melissa King, from The Santa Clause.
- Kevin Pollak as Cupid
- Tracy Morgan as The Easter Bunny. He replaces Jay Thomas from previous films, due to his death in 2017.
- Michael Dorn as Sandman

== Episodes ==
=== Series overview ===
Season	Episodes	Originally released	
Season	Episodes	First released	Last released
1	6	November 16, 2022	December 14, 2022
2	6	November 8, 2023	December 6, 2023

=== Season 1 (2022) ===
No. overall	No. in season	Title	Directed by	Written by	Original release date	Prod. code
1	1	"Chapter One: Good to Ho"	Jason Winer	Jack Burditt	November 16, 2022	1HMD01
In 2022, 28 years have passed since Scott Calvin took on the role of Santa Claus. (Note: As depicted in The Santa Clause (1994)) While doing his rounds with his assistant elf Noel, Scott's magic falters causing the reindeer to go off course, resulting in them landing back to the North Pole. Meanwhile, Scott's wife, Carol eavesdrop on her children, Buddy "Cal" and Sandra, the former of who is playing virtual reality. Sandra notes that growing up at the North Pole she hasn't had any friends and notes how Mrs. Claus is perceived. Meanwhile, Simon Chokshi, a head executive at EverythingNow, is trying to balance life as a single father of his daughter Grace after his wife died. Scott returns and learns he is losing weight, causing him to start deliberately trying to gain weight. However, he continues to lose more weight over time. The following year as he is doing his rounds, he falls off a roof, leading to Carol being worried as Betty, Noel's wife and head elf is worried about Scott. Grace confronts Simon about his beliefs about Santa, but he explains he doesn't know if he is real.: Note: The ending scene where Scott falls off the roof is a callback to The Santa Clause, when Scott had the roof mishap with Santa on Christmas Eve.
2	2	"Chapter Two: The Secessus Clause"	Jason Winer	Katy Colloton & Katie O'Brien	November 16, 2022	1HMD02
Betty informs Scott of yet another clause called the Secessus Clause, which would allow Scott to retire as Santa once he chooses a worthy successor. Scott initially considers his sons for the role, but Charlie turns him down as he is happily married with a family of his own and Cal expresses a desire to see the real world. Meanwhile, Simon tries to get investors for his business to improve his delivery system, but it backfires when one of his automated drones malfunctions. Returning home, Simon and Grace find their living room decorated for Christmas just before the elves come to take them to the North Pole.
3	3	"Chapter Three: Into the Wobbly Woods"	Charles Randolph-Wright	Kevin Hench	November 23, 2022	1HMD03
Scott meets with potential candidates for Santa Claus (including Peyton Manning) while Carol and Cal look forward to life outside the Pole, though Sandra, however, is reluctant to leave. While Scott meets with Simon, Sandra takes Grace on a tour of the Pole and discovers she can understand animals. She and Grace go to the Wobbly Woods to meet with Befana, the Christmas Witch. Scott and Simon go looking for them and bond over their mutual struggles as fathers. Scott decides to make Simon the new Santa Claus and he and his family depart for Chicago.
4	4	"Chapter Four: The Shoes Off the Bed Clause"	Charles Randolph-Wright	Ari Berkowitz & Alison Bennett	November 30, 2022	1HMD04
The Calvin family starts adapting to life in the real world. Carol is offered a job running a local school, Cal becomes smitten with a girl named Riley and Sandra makes friends by joining an equestrian club. Scott, however, struggles to adapt to no longer being Santa. At the North Pole, Simon's first day as Santa is off to a rocky start as he has lost the Santa coat and then decides to launch a new campaign called Christmas Every Day, which massively backfires by lowering the Christmas spirit and causing the elves to start disappearing, worrying Betty, whom Simon fires after she begins questioning him. Betty visits Befana in search of an old friend only to find the Santa coat.
5	5	"Chapter Five: Across the Yule-Verse"	Katie Locke O'Brien	Eugene Garcia-Cross and Hayley Frazier & Emalee Burditt	December 7, 2022	1HMD05
Bernard appears before Scott and tells him he needs to return to his role as Santa. To convince him, Bernard takes him to visit Scott's predecessor, Santa XVII, who reveals that all previous Santas were ethereal and Scott was chosen to become Santa because of his giving spirit as a child. The clauses were created to help guide him in his endeavors. Learning of Simon's campaign, Scott returns to the North Pole much to his family's concern. When they realize what is going on, they decide to follow. At the North Pole, Scott is locked up by Simon.
6	6	"Chapter Six: A Christmas to Remember"	Katie Locke O'Brien	Hayley Frazier & Emalee Burditt	December 14, 2022	1HMD06
After breaking out, Scott reunites with his family, who split up when they learn that the Santa coat is searching for him. Unfortunately, Simon beats them to it and threatens to burn the coat but is stopped by Grace. Showing her father a snow globe containing memories of the last Christmas with her late mother, Simon comes to his senses and apologizes to Grace for everything. Reembracing the Christmas spirit with his family, Scott returns to the role of Santa and the elves return. After returning the Choksis back to their home, Scott and his family set out to deliver presents. Cal even delivers a bouquet of poinsettias to his girlfriend Riley, who believes the truth about Cal’s family and kisses him. Returning home, Scott and his family celebrate, more than ready to prepare for next year.

=== Season 2 (2023) ===
No. overall	No. in season	Title	Directed by	Written by	Original release date	Prod. code
7	1	"Chapter Seven: The Kribble Krabble Clause"	Jason Winer	Jack Burditt	November 8, 2023	2HMD01
8	2	"Chapter Eight: Floofy"	Jason Winer	Jack Burditt	November 8, 2023	2HMD02
9	3	"Chapter Nine: No Magic at the Dinner Table"	Katie Locke O'Brien	Camille Patrao & Eugene Garcia-Cross	November 15, 2023	2HMD03
10	4	"Chapter Ten: Miracle on Dead Creek Road"	Katie Locke O'Brien	Katy Colloton & Katie O'Brien	November 22, 2023	2HMD04
11	5	"Chapter Eleven: B-E-T-T-Y"	Charles Randolph-Wright	Emalee Burditt & Hayley Frazier	November 29, 2023	2HMD05
12	6	"Chapter Twelve: Wanga Banga Langa"	Charles Randolph-Wright	Vali Chandrasekaran	December 6, 2023	2HMD06

== Production ==
=== Development ===
In January 2022, it was announced that a limited series that would serve as a legacy-sequel to The Santa Clause films was in development, with Tim Allen reprising his role in addition to serving as executive producer. Initially given the working title of "The Clauses", the project was conceptualized with intent for a streaming release exclusive to Disney+. Jack Burditt serves as showrunner and executive producer, while Jason Winer is a director in addition to serving as an executive producer.

According to Allen, "It originally had a lot of otherworldly characters, and ghosts, and goblins. I said no, this is Christ-mas. Its Christ-mas. It literally is a religious holiday. We don't have to blow trumpets, but I do want you to acknowledge it. That's what this is about. If you want to get into Santa Claus, you're gonna have to go back to history, and it's all about religion." On December 14, 2022, The Santa Clauses was renewed for a second season, with Tim Allen and Elizabeth Mitchell set to return.

=== Casting ===
Tim Allen and Elizabeth Mitchell were announced to be reprising their roles as Scott Calvin / Santa Claus and Carol Calvin / Mrs. Claus, respectively. In addition, Kal Penn joined the cast as a character named Simon Choski. Elizabeth Allen-Dick, Tim Allen's real life daughter, was cast in her acting debut as Scott's daughter. Austin Kane, Rupali Redd and Devin Bright also joined the cast. Matilda Lawler joined the cast as a series regular. In late July 2022, it was confirmed that David Krumholtz would be reprising his role as Bernard, while the following month, Laura San Giacomo was announced to be portraying the Christmas Witch. On February 24, 2023, Eric Stonestreet joined the cast in undisclosed capacity while Marta Kessler was cast to guest star for the second season. Three days later, Gabriel Iglesias was cast as a series regular for the second season. On May 3, 2023, it was announced that Tracy Morgan was set to make a cameo and Stonestreet was cast as a series regular for the second season.

=== Filming ===
The series began filming in March 2022 in Los Angeles, with JP Wakayama serving as the cinematographer. Filming wrapped in June 2022. Production for the second season began in February 2023.

=== Music ===
In November 2022, it was revealed that Ariel Rechtshaid would compose the score for the series.

A digital soundtrack for the series' second season became available on December 8, 2023.

The Santa Clauses: Season 2 (Original Soundtrack)
Song name	Artist
"Dancing with My Elf"	The Santa Clauses – Cast
"Christmas (Baby Please Come Home)"	Lawrence
"We Wish You a Merry Christmas"	The Santa Clauses – Cast
"If You Leave"	The Santa Clauses – Cast
"Santa Claus Is Comin' to Town"	The Santa Clauses – Cast

== Release ==
The Santa Clauses was released on November 16, 2022 on Disney+, with its first two episodes available immediately.

The first 2 episodes made its linear premiere on Freeform on December 16, 2022 followed by airings on FX on December 17, 2022, ABC on December 24, 2022 and on Disney Channel on December 25, 2022. The second season premiered on November 8, 2023, with two new episodes.

== Reception ==
=== Viewership ===
JustWatch, a streaming content guide, reported that The Santa Clauses was the tenth most-streamed series in the U.S. from November 14–20, 2022. Whip Media, which tracks viewership data for the more than 21 million worldwide users of its TV Time app, calculated that it was among the five most-streamed original shows in the U.S. between December 11 and 24, 2022. Luminate, which measures streaming performance in the U.S., reported that The Santa Clauses accounted for 3.9% of total original series viewership on Disney+ between December 31, 2021, and December 29, 2022. In 2023, The Santa Clauses was among the top ten most-streamed original series in the U.S. from November 19 to December 16, according to Whip Media.

=== Critical response ===
On the review aggregator website Rotten Tomatoes, 55% of 22 critics' reviews are positive, with an average rating of 5.6/10. The website's consensus reads: "The Santa Clauses is a bit ho ho ho-hum as a continuation of the holiday franchise, but it's hardly a lump of coal thanks to Tim Allen's spirited return as Father Christmas, along with a dash of yuletide nostalgia." Metacritic, which uses a weighted average, assigned a score of 55 out of 100 based on six critics, indicating "mixed or average reviews".

=== Accolades ===
Award	Date of ceremony	Category	Nominee(s)	Result	Ref.
Children's and Family Emmy Awards	December 16–17, 2023	Outstanding Lead Performance in a Preschool, Children's or Young Teen Program	Tim Allen	Nominated	
Children's and Family Emmy Awards	December 16–17, 2023	Outstanding Supporting Performance in a Preschool, Children's or Young Teen Program	Kal Penn	Nominated	
Children's and Family Emmy Awards	December 16–17, 2023	Outstanding Younger Performer in a Preschool, Children's or Young Teen Program	Matilda Lawler	Nominated	
Children's and Family Emmy Awards	December 16–17, 2023	Outstanding Younger Performer in a Preschool, Children's or Young Teen Program	Rupali Redd	Nominated	
Children's and Family Emmy Awards	December 16–17, 2023	Outstanding Art Direction/Set Decoration/Scenic Design	Melanie Jones, Hunter Brown, Zak Faust and Maile Cassara	Nominated	
Children's and Family Emmy Awards	December 16–17, 2023	Outstanding Cinematography for a Live Action Single-Camera Program	J.P. Wakayama	Nominated	
Children's and Family Emmy Awards	December 16–17, 2023	Outstanding Makeup and Hairstyling	Anissa Salazar, Kathleen Freeman, Erica Preus, Howard Berger, Garrett Immel, and Jeni Novak	Nominated	
Children's and Family Emmy Awards	March 15, 2025	Outstanding Supporting Performer in a Preschool, Children's or Young Teen Program	Elizabeth Mitchell	Nominated	
Children's and Family Emmy Awards	March 15, 2025	Outstanding Supporting Performer in a Preschool, Children's or Young Teen Program	Eric Stonestreet	Nominated	
Children's and Family Emmy Awards	March 15, 2025	Outstanding Art Direction/Set Decoration/Scenic Design for a Single Camera Program	Zak Faust, Amanda Knehans, Melanie Paizis-Jones, and Maile Cassara	Nominated	
Children's and Family Emmy Awards	March 15, 2025	Outstanding Makeup and Hairstyling	Howard Berger, Erica Preus, Scott Stoddard, Nina Adado, Taylor Bennett, Morgan Ferrando, Patricia Pineda Lansingh, Shay Sanford Fong, Stephanie Kae Panek, Kathleen Freeman, and Anissa Salazar	Won	
Make-Up Artists and Hair Stylists Guild Awards	February 18, 2024	Best Makeup - Children and Teen Television Programming	Erica Preus, Howard Berger. Scott Stoddard, and Eryn Krueger Mekash	Nominated	
Make-Up Artists and Hair Stylists Guild Awards	February 18, 2024	Best Hair Styling - Children and Teen Television Programming	Anissa Salazar, Nina Adado. Morgan Ferrando, and Patricia Lansingh	Won	

== See also ==
- List of Christmas films
- Santa Claus in film
