= The Santa Clause 3: The Escape Clause =

2006 film directed by Michael Lembeck

- Theatrical release poster
- Directed by: Michael Lembeck
- Written by: Ed Decter; John J. Strauss
- Based on: Characters created by Leo Benvenuti; Steve Rudnick
- Produced by: Robert Newmyer; Brian Reilly; Jeffrey Silver
- Starring: Tim Allen; Elizabeth Mitchell; Judge Reinhold; Wendy Crewson; Ann-Margret; Eric Lloyd; Spencer Breslin; Liliana Mumy; Alan Arkin; Martin Short
- Cinematography: Robbie Greenberg
- Edited by: David Finfer
- Music by: George S. Clinton
- Production companies: Walt Disney Pictures; Outlaw Productions; Boxing Cat Films
- Distributed by: Buena Vista Pictures Distribution
- Release date: November 3, 2006
- Running time: 92 minutes
- Country: United States
- Language: English
- Box office: $110.8 million

The Santa Clause 3: The Escape Clause is a 2006 American Christmas comedy film directed by Michael Lembeck. It is the third installment in The Santa Clause franchise, following The Santa Clause (1994) and The Santa Clause 2 (2002). The film features Tim Allen returning as Scott Calvin, who must find a way to make his family happy while trying to stop Jack Frost (Martin Short) from stealing his title as Santa Clause. Allen and Short had previously worked together in the 1997 Disney comedy film, Jungle 2 Jungle. Most of the supporting actors from the first two films reprise their roles, with the exception of David Krumholtz. As a result of his absence, Curtis (played by Spencer Breslin), who was previously the Assistant Head Elf, has now been promoted to Bernard's former position. This was Peter Boyle's final film to be released during his lifetime (2008's All Roads Lead Home was released posthumously). Its production was completed in February 2006.

The film was theatrically released by Buena Vista Pictures Distribution in the United States on November 3, 2006, and grossed over $110 million worldwide. The film received negative reviews from critics.

== Plot ==
Twelve years have passed since Scott Calvin took on the mantle of Santa Claus. He is now married to Carol Newman, who is now a teacher in the North Pole. (Note: As depicted in The Santa Clause 2 (2002)) On Christmas Eve, she tells a group of young elves a story from her life with Scott while expecting their first child.

Scott invites his in-laws, Sylvia and Bud Newman, to the North Pole, along with Scott's ex-wife Laura, her husband Neil, their daughter Lucy, and Scott's son Charlie. Meanwhile, he is summoned to a meeting of the Council of Legendary Figures, consisting of Mother Nature, Father Time, the Easter Bunny, Cupid, the Tooth Fairy, and the Sandman, concerning the behavior of Jack Frost, who is jealous that he has no holiday or special occasion in his honor. Because he has been promoting himself during the Christmas season, Mother Nature suggests sanctions against him.

As Scott is attempting to get the in-laws to come without revealing that he is Santa, Jack Frost negotiates a light sentence of community service at the North Pole. He is to help him and the elves put up various Canadian-themed paraphernalia, as Carol's parents believe he is a toymaker in Canada. So Scott consents.

However, Frost's ultimate goal is to trick Santa into renouncing his position. When now Head elf Curtis inadvertently reveals the "Escape Clause", Frost sneaks into The Hall of Snow Globes and steals the one containing Scott as Santa. If Scott holds the globe and wishes to have "never been Santa at all," he will go back in time and undo his career as Santa. When Lucy discovers this, Frost freezes her parents and locks her in a closet. He then orchestrates situations that make Scott think he must resign to make things better.

Frost tricks Scott into invoking the Escape Clause, so both are sent to Scott's front yard in 1994, when Scott caused the original Santa to fall off his roof and had to replace him. Frost causes the original Santa's fall and grabs his coat before Scott can. Scott is sent to an alternate 2006, where he has been CEO of his old company for the last twelve years and business takes priority over family. He also learns that Laura and Neil divorced and Carol moved away years ago.

Scott goes to find Lucy and Neil, who are vacationing at the North Pole, which Frost has turned into a theme park. Christmas is now "Frostmas", the elves are miserable, the reindeer are confined to a petting zoo, and parents can pay for their kids to be placed on the nice list. Scott finds Lucy and questions Neil about Laura; he states that Scott’s workaholic absence in Charlie’s life put all the pressure on Neil. As Charlie did not want him to be his father, it caused the divorce between him and Laura.

Scott confronts Frost, causing a distraction so that Lucy can steal Frost's snow globe for him. She throws the snow globe to him, but Frost catches it. Scott plays a recording of Frost saying "I wish I'd never been Santa at all" from a novelty North Pole pen given to him earlier, invoking the Escape Clause, sending both of them back to 1994. Scott restrains Jack long enough to let his 1994 counterpart get the coat, making him Santa Claus again and sending both back to the present in the original timeline.

Scott reconciles with his family, Frost's sabotage is fixed by Charlie and the Council of Legendary figures and Jack is arrested by elf police. He reveals he cannot unfreeze his victims unless he unfreezes himself, something he says he will never do. So Scott convinces Lucy via a snow globe he had given her earlier of her warmly hugging a snowman, to give Frost a "magic hug" to unfreeze and reform him. It works, Laura and Neil unfreeze and Frost becomes a new person. The "Canada" ruse is dropped and Scott appears as Santa to Carol's parents. With two hours remaining before Santa must leave for his Christmas deliveries, Carol goes into labor.

Months later, while Carol is telling the tale to her students, Scott walks in to show their son, Buddy Claus.

== Cast ==
- Tim Allen as Scott Calvin / Santa Claus
- Martin Short as Jack Frost
- Elizabeth Mitchell as Carol Calvin / Mrs. Claus
- Judge Reinhold as Neil Miller
- Wendy Crewson as Laura Miller
- Liliana Mumy as Lucy Miller
- Alan Arkin as Bud Newman
- Ann-Margret as Sylvia Newman
- Spencer Breslin as Curtis the Elf
- Eric Lloyd as Charlie Calvin
- Aisha Tyler as Mother Nature
- Peter Boyle as Father Time
- Michael Dorn as the Sandman
- Jay Thomas as the Easter Bunny
- Kevin Pollak as Cupid
- Art LaFleur as the Tooth Fairy
- Abigail Breslin as Trish
- Bob Bergen as the voice of Comet

== Production ==
Filming took place from December 2005 to February 2006 at Downey Studios in Downey, California, with Elfsburg Village being shot on Stage 1, and the suburban scenes being shot on the studio's backlot.

The looks for Jack Frost and Mrs. Claus were originally different. Frost's initial appearance was more of a British 1960s look that was more impish and elfin, but the threat level was not up to the level that director Michael Lembeck wanted. Costume designer Ingrid Ferrin designed a new costume for Frost with a velvet zoot suit feel. Mrs. Claus's initial appearance was based on her end-credits dance scene in The Santa Clause 2. In that scene, Elizabeth Mitchell wore prosthetic makeup that made her appear round and chubby. After the second day of principal photography, Lembeck was not seeing any emotional content in Mitchell's performance due to the amount of makeup applied on her.

== Reception ==
=== Critical response ===
On Rotten Tomatoes, the film holds an approval rating of 17% based on 66 reviews, with an average rating of 3.8/10. The site's critical consensus reads, "Playing Jack Frost as an evil cross between Liza Minnelli and Liberace, Martin Short is a welcome presence, but this tired series continues drawing from its bag of bland gags and dumb slapstick." On Metacritic, the film has a weighted average score of 32 out of 100, based on 17 critics, indicating "generally unfavorable reviews". Audiences polled by CinemaScore gave the film an average grade of "B+" on an A+ to F scale.

Eric D. Snider wrote that Allen did The Santa Clause "The first time with enthusiasm, the second time with affection and the third time for a paycheck". Kyle Smith wrote, "We're getting a turkey and a ham for the holidays. Santa is so dumb he should be demoted to cleaning up after Geoffrey the Giraffe at Toys 'R' Us." Manohla Dargis dismissed the film as "Squeaky clean, but you might die of boredom." Finally, Mark Kermode described it on BBC Radio 5 Live as "the cinematic equivalent of tertiary syphilis".

In a more positive review, Variety's Justin Chang said The Santa Clause 3 was "a much cleaner, more streamlined ride than its overstuffed predecessor", adding that "Michael Lembeck directs the action with a surer touch and more consistent tone than he brought to Santa Clause 2, and effortlessly pulls off the pic's sentimental, life-affirming moments without tugging too hard."

=== Awards and nominations ===
Award	Category	Subject	Result
Golden Raspberry Award	Worst Actor	Tim Allen	Nominated
Golden Raspberry Award	Worst Screen Couple	Tim Allen	Nominated
Golden Raspberry Award	Worst Screen Couple	Martin Short	Nominated
Golden Raspberry Award	Worst Supporting Actor	Martin Short	Nominated
Golden Raspberry Award	Worst Prequel or Sequel		Nominated
Golden Raspberry Award	Worst Excuse for Family Entertainment		Nominated

=== Box office ===
The first two films had become box-office successes during their opening weekends, but The Santa Clause 3 was beaten by Borat for the No. 1 spot.

The Santa Clause 3 made $84,500,122 in North America and a worldwide gross of $110,768,122. The first film made $189,833,357 worldwide at the box-office while the second film made $172,855,065.

== Home video ==
The Santa Clause 3 was released on DVD and Blu-ray Disc on November 20, 2007.

== Video game ==
A tie-in video game was released on November 1, 2006, for the Game Boy Advance, developed by 1st Playable Productions and published by Buena Vista Games.

== Sequel television series ==
A television series serving as a sequel, The Santa Clauses, was released on Disney+, with Tim Allen reprising his role as Scott Calvin / Santa Claus and Jack Burditt serving as showrunner and executive producer. Realizing he can't be Santa Claus forever, an aging Scott Calvin sets off to find a suitable replacement, while helping his children get used to a new adventure south of the pole.

== See also ==
- List of Christmas films
- Santa Claus in film
