= The Santa Clause =

1994 film directed by John Pasquin

- Theatrical release poster
- Directed by: John Pasquin
- Written by: Leo Benvenuti; Steve Rudnick
- Produced by: Brian Reilly; Jeffrey Silver; Robert Newmyer
- Starring: Tim Allen; Judge Reinhold; Wendy Crewson; David Krumholtz; Peter Boyle
- Cinematography: Walt Lloyd
- Edited by: Larry Bock
- Music by: Michael Convertino
- Production companies: Walt Disney Pictures; Hollywood Pictures; Outlaw Productions
- Distributed by: Buena Vista Pictures Distribution
- Release dates: November 5, 1994 (Hollywood); November 11, 1994 (United States)
- Running time: 97 minutes
- Country: United States
- Language: English
- Budget: $22 million
- Box office: $190.5 million

The Santa Clause is a 1994 American Christmas fantasy comedy film directed by John Pasquin, produced by Brian Reilly, Jeffrey Silver, and Robert Newmyer, and written by the writing team of Leo Benvenuti and Steve Rudnick. The first installment in The Santa Clause franchise, it stars Tim Allen as Scott Calvin, a divorced marketing executive who accidentally causes Santa Claus to fall from his roof to his presumed death on Christmas Eve, (Note: The 2022 TV series The Santa Clauses retcons this event as an intentional action on Santa's part and shows him retiring to the afterlife.) inadvertently agreeing to a contract that forces him to take up the mantle.

The Santa Clause premiered at the Village Theater in Westwood on November 5, 1994, and was theatrically released by Buena Vista Pictures Distribution in the United States on November 11. It grossed $190.5 million worldwide against a $22 million budget, and received positive reviews from critics, and it has since become a Christmas-time staple among viewers. Its success led to two sequels, The Santa Clause 2 (2002) and The Santa Clause 3: The Escape Clause (2006), both of which were commercially successful despite the former's mixed and the latter's negative reception. The franchise continued with a follow-up series, The Santa Clauses, which premiered November 16, 2022 on Disney+.

== Plot ==
Scott Calvin, a 37-year-old marketing director for a toy company based in Lakeside, Illinois and divorced father, prepares to spend Christmas Eve with his young son, eight-year-old Charlie. He wants Charlie to maintain his belief in Santa Claus, even though he does not believe in him. Scott's ex-wife, Laura, and her psychiatrist husband, Dr. Neil Miller, stopped believing in Santa at a young age and feel it is time for Charlie to do the same.

Scott and Charlie are awakened that night by a noise on the roof. While investigating, Scott startles Santa Claus, who falls off the roof and is believed to be dead. Santa's body vanishes, leaving behind his familiar suit and a business card instructing the reader to wear his suit should anything unfortunate happen to him, and the reindeer will respond accordingly. Scott and Charlie find Santa's sleigh and reindeer on the roof. At Charlie's request, Scott reluctantly dons the suit and delivers gifts before the reindeer take them to the North Pole, where he learns that, by wearing the suit, he is subject to a legal technicality known as "the Santa Clause," and has accepted all of the late Santa's duties and responsibilities. Head elf Bernard gives Scott eleven months to get his affairs in order before reporting back to the North Pole on Thanksgiving. Overwhelmed, he changes into the pajamas provided to him and falls asleep. The next morning, Scott awakens in his own bed, believing the previous events were a dream, but realizes he is still wearing the pajamas he was given. Charlie is proud that his father is the new Santa Claus, which rouses concern among Laura, Neil, and the school staff. Scott, not wanting to destroy Charlie's enthusiasm, asks him to keep their North Pole trip a secret.

Over the next year, Scott begins to take on Santa's appearance and habits. He develops a ravenous appetite for sweets, primarily milk and cookies despite previously being lactose intolerant. The newfound taste for these treats cause Scott to gain an inordinate amount of weight seemingly overnight as he balloons to 192lbs. He grows a white beard that instantly regrows after shaving, and his hair turns white no matter how much he dyes it. During a meeting with his company, Scott argues against a proposal to advertise a toy military tank by showing Santa riding it, insisting that he must use his sleigh, after which Scott's boss Mr. Whittle asks him to get some help until he can return to work. His doctor provides no explanation for the sudden change, despite Scott insisting that gaining 45lbs in a week is not right. He also begins to recount, by name, "naughty" and "nice" children he sees. After Laura and Neil witness children wanting to sit on Scott's lap at Charlie's soccer game, they assume Scott is deliberately misleading Charlie, so they get Scott's visitation rights suspended.

On Thanksgiving, a distraught Scott goes to Laura and Neil's house to see Charlie one last time. Desperate to help him realize how important he is to the children of the world, he shows him a magical snow globe (a gift from Bernard), convincing him that he really is Santa. When Laura and Neil allow the two a minute to talk alone, Bernard appears and transports them to the North Pole to test out the magic of the snowglobe. Thinking Scott has kidnapped Charlie, Laura and Neil summon the police.

On Christmas Eve, Scott sets out to deliver gifts with Charlie in tow. Upon arriving at Laura and Neil’s home, he is arrested inside the house while Charlie waits for him in the sleigh. The elves eventually break him out of jail. When Scott returns Charlie to his house, he insists that he spend the evening with Laura and Neil. His heartfelt speech to Charlie about the importance of everyone in the family convinces Laura and Neil that he is Santa.

Laura burns the court documents suspending Scott's visitation rights, and tells him he can visit anytime. According to Bernard, any time Charlie shakes his snow globe, his father will appear. Before leaving, Scott gives Laura and Neil the two presents they never received as children, which led to their disbelief in Santa. Scott's takeoff from the roof proves his identity to the police and various witnesses outside the house. After Scott leaves, Charlie summons him back with the snow globe. Laura agrees to let them go together in the sleigh to finish delivering the presents.

== Cast ==
- Tim Allen as Scott Calvin/Santa Claus
- Eric Lloyd as Charlie Calvin, Scott and Laura's son
- Wendy Crewson as Laura Miller, Scott's ex-wife and Charlie's mother
- Judge Reinhold as Dr. Neil Miller, Laura's second husband and Charlie's stepfather
- David Krumholtz as Bernard the Head Elf
- Peter Boyle as Mr. Whittle
- Larry Brandenburg as Detective Nunzio
- Steve Vinovich as Dr. Pete Novos
- Mary Gross as Ms. Daniels
- Paige Tamada as Judy the Elf
- Kenny Vadas as the Leader of E.L.F.S.: a special forces-type group of elves that breaks Scott out of jail
- Chris Benson as Fireman O'Hara
- Joyce Guy as Principal Compton
- Jayne Eastwood as Judy the Waitress
- Judith Scott as Susan Perry
- Tabitha Lupien as Ballet Girl
- Lachlan Murdoch as Fax Kid
- John Pasquin as Santa #6
- Frank Welker as Reindeer (voice)
- Kerrigan Mahan as Reindeer (voice)
- Bob Dermer as Puppet Punch
- Nina Keogh as Puppet Judy
- Melissa King as Sara
- Steve Lucescu as the previous Santa Claus (uncredited)

== Production ==
The script was written on spec by Steve Rudnick and Leo Benvenuti. In November 1992, it was announced Hollywood Pictures had acquired the script as a potential starring vehicle for Tim Allen.

The film was shot at Raleigh Studios in Hollywood, California, and on location in the Greater Toronto Area, with Oakville serving as the city of Lakeside, Illinois. The reindeer used in the film were all from the Toronto Zoo. The trains used in the North Pole scene and the start of the film were all made by LGB. Eric Lloyd had to wear fake teeth and part of his dialogue was rearranged after he knocked out his teeth in an accident on a day off.

Bill Murray and Chevy Chase were offered the role of Scott Calvin, but both turned it down; Chase declined due to scheduling conflicts, and Murray did not want to do another holiday-themed movie after doing Scrooged. Tom Selleck, Robin Williams, Tom Hanks, and Mel Gibson were also considered for the role. Jeff Daniels, Stanley Tucci, Christopher McDonald, and Bradley Whitford were considered for the role of Neil Miller. Patricia Richardson (Allen's co-star on Home Improvement), Patricia Clarkson, Patricia Heaton, and Kate Burton were considered for the role of Laura Miller.

== Soundtrack ==
The Milan Records released the film soundtrack in 1994. The majority of the album contains the film score by Michael Convertino. The album also contains the songs "The Bells of Christmas", written and performed by Loreena McKennitt; and "Christmas Will Return", written by Jimmy Webb and performed by Brenda Russell and Howard Hewett—both featured in the film. "Jingle Bells (movie version)" by Yello is included in overseas editions; The Drifters' version of "White Christmas", the Brazilian and European editions.

== Reception ==
=== Box office ===
The Santa Clause grossed $145.3 million in the United States and Canada, and $45 million in other territories, for a worldwide, total of $190.3 million.

The film grossed $19.3 million in its opening weekend, finishing second at the US box office behind Interview with the Vampire which opened with $36 million. In its second weekend it grossed $17.1 million, finishing third. Over the three-day Thanksgiving frame it then made $20.4 million, peaked at number one. In November 2020, with the COVID-19 pandemic limiting new releases, The Santa Clause was re-released into 1,581 theaters and grossed $711,000.

Freeform and AMC have played the film on television during the holiday season with record ratings.

=== Critical response ===
On Rotten Tomatoes, the film holds an approval rating of 73% based on 59 reviews, with an average rating of 5.9/10. The website's critics consensus reads: "The Santa Clause is utterly undemanding, but it's firmly rooted in the sort of good old-fashioned holiday spirit missing from too many modern yuletide films." On Metacritic, the film has a weighted average score of 57 out of 100, based on reviews from 13 critics, indicating "mixed or average reviews". Audiences surveyed by CinemaScore gave the film an average grade "A−" on scale of A+ to F.

Sandi Davis of The Oklahoman placed the film sixth overall on her list of the best films of 1994.

Duane Byrge of The Hollywood Reporter gave a positive review and said, "You don’t have to read the fine print in this Clause, only its broad strokes — it has family hit written all over it."

Roger Ebert of the Chicago Sun-Times gave the film two and a half stars out of four and said, "I personally found I just didn't care much: That, despite its charms, the movie didn't push over the top into true inspiration. I would have traded a lot of The Santa Clause for just one shot of Groucho Marx explaining how there ain’t no sanity clause."

== Home media ==
The Santa Clause was released on VHS and LaserDisc on October 25, 1995.

A special edition DVD of The Santa Clause was released on October 29, 2002, and was presented in THX certified widescreen and fullscreen versions.

=== Phone number controversy ===
At one point in the film, a brief exchange between Scott and Laura takes place in which Laura hands Scott a piece of paper with Neil's mother's phone number on it. Scott then says "1-800-SPANK-ME. I know that number." At the time, this was not a fictitious telephone number, but was used by a sex line belonging to American TelNet. While the number itself was toll-free and instructed callers under the age of 18 to hang up, it encouraged listeners to choose from a series of premium-rate 900 numbers. This coincidence was discovered by two young children in Concord Township, Ohio, after seeing the film in theaters in December 1994. A Disney spokesperson replied, "I can't imagine that people would call that number," and the film was not recalled from its theatrical run as some requested. However, after the film was released on VHS, Disney received complaints from parents whose children had dialed the number and then racked up hundreds of dollars in phone bills. Disney's legal affairs department attempted to buy out the 1-800-SPANK-ME service and disconnect the number, without success. In 1997, Disney informed the father of a 10-year-old girl who had incurred charges of US$250 (equivalent to $501.4 in 2025) to the line that future printings of the home video would remove the line, as well as future broadcasts of the film on the Disney Channel. Beginning with the 1999 DVD release, the exchange was removed from all future United States home media releases of the film (though it remains in the earlier released VHS and LaserDisc releases) and most digital downloads. The line is also removed from the Disney+ print. On television broadcasts, the number is changed to 1-800-POUND.

== See also ==
- List of Christmas films
- Santa Claus in film
