= Jesse (TV series) =

- Genre: Sitcom
- Created by: Ira Ungerleider
- Starring: Christina Applegate; George Dzundza; David DeLuise; Eric Lloyd; John Lehr; Jennifer Milmore; Liza Snyder; Bruno Campos; Kevin Rahm; Darryl Theirse
- Theme music composer: Stephen Bertrand; James Jacob Farris; Michael Skloff
- Opening theme: "Time for You", performed by The Tories
- Composer: Michael Skloff
- Country of origin: United States
- Original language: English
- No. of seasons: 2
- No. of episodes: 42

Production
- Executive producers: Kevin Bright; David Crane; Marta Kauffman (all; entire run); Ira Ungerleider; Stephen Nathan (both; season 1); Wil Calhoun (season 2); Christina Applegate (season 2)
- Cinematography: Mikel Neiers
- Camera setup: Multi-camera
- Running time: 30 minutes
- Production companies: Bright/Kauffman/Crane Productions; Warner Bros. Television

Original release
- Network: NBC
- Release: September 24, 1998 – May 25, 2000

Jesse is an American sitcom television series created by Ira Ungerleider and starring Christina Applegate, that ran on NBC from September 24, 1998, to May 25, 2000, for two seasons of a total 42 episodes.

The series was produced by Bright/Kauffman/Crane Productions in association with Warner Bros. Television.

== Synopsis ==
The show stars Christina Applegate as single mother Jesse Warner, raising her twelve-year-old son, Little John, in Buffalo, New York. She works for her overbearing father in a German-themed bar, serving beer while wearing a dirndl. Jesse's love interest, a Chilean named Diego (Bruno Campos), gains a rival when her ex-husband comes to town, intent on winning her back.

In the second season, Jesse becomes a nurse and stories revolve around her friends instead of her family.

== Cast ==
=== Main ===
- Christina Applegate as Jesse Elizabeth Warner
- George Dzundza as John Warner, Sr. (season 1)
- David DeLuise as Darren Warner (season 1)
- Eric Lloyd as "Little John" Warner
- John Lehr as John Warner, Jr. (season 1)
- Jennifer Milmore as Carrie
- Liza Snyder as Linda
- Bruno Campos as Diego Vasquez
- Kevin Rahm as Dr. Danny Kozak (season 2)
- Darryl Theirse as Kurt Bemis (guest season 1; main season 2)

=== Recurring ===
- Michael Weatherly as Roy Bently (season 1)
- Michael Welch as Gabe (season 2)
- Jacqueline Obradors as Irma (season 2)

== Episodes ==
While Jesse was in the top 20 in the Nielsen ratings regularly, the show lost much of the audience from Friends, its powerful lead-in. In season 2, Jesse lost almost 20% of the Friends audience. As a result, NBC decided to cancel the show after its second season. A total of 42 episodes were produced.

Season	Episodes	Originally released		Rank	Average viewership (in millions)
Season	Episodes	First released	Last released	Rank	Average viewership (in millions)
1	22	September 24, 1998	April 1, 1999	#4	20.1
2	20	September 23, 1999	May 25, 2000	#12	16.65

=== Season 1 (1998–99) ===
No. overall	No. in season	Title	Directed by	Written by	Original release date	Prod. code	U.S. viewers (millions)
1	1	"A Side of Chile"	James Burrows	Ira Ungerleider	September 24, 1998	475141	27.37
2	2	"Goober Up the Nose"	Robby Benson	Story by : Matt Martin; Teleplay by : Greg Rice	October 1, 1998	467404	21.62
3	3	"Bees Do It, Birds Do It, But Not in a Car"	Robby Benson	Ira Ungerleider & Stephen Nathan	October 8, 1998	467402	21.30
4	4	"Live Nude Girl"	Robby Benson	Ira Ungerleider & Stephen Nathan	October 15, 1998	467401	19.21
5	5	"Boo! He's Back"	Robby Benson	Nancy Steen	October 29, 1998	467403	21.70
6	6	"The Methadone Clinic"	Robby Benson	Tad Quill	November 5, 1998	467405	20.84
7	7	"The Kiss"	Robby Benson	Dana Klein	November 12, 1998	467406	20.66
8	8	"The Cheese Ship"	Robby Benson	Jeffrey B. Hodes & Nastaran Dibai	November 19, 1998	467407	19.01
9	9	"Barko, the Holiest Dog in the World"	Kevin S. Bright	Peter Murrieta & Gabrielle Allen	December 10, 1998	467408	19.14
10	10	"Boo! He's Gone"	Joe Regalbuto	Greg Rice	December 17, 1998	467409	19.70
11	11	"The Best Deal Possible"	Michael Lembeck	Dan Sterling & Zachary Rosenblatt	January 14, 1999	467410	20.40
12	12	"The Mischievous Elf"	Amanda Bearse	Dan Sterling	January 21, 1999	467411	21.11
13	13	"My Casual Friend's Wedding"	Robby Benson	Nancy Steen	January 28, 1999	467412	17.08
14	14	"Hickory, Dickory, Death"	Joe Regalbuto	Peter Murrieta & Gabrielle Allen	February 4, 1999	467414	19.49
15	15	"Crazy White Female"	Joe Regalbuto	Jeffrey B. Hodes & Nastaran Dibai	February 11, 1999	467413	22.32
16	16	"Bar Remodel"	Gail Mancuso	Tad Quill	February 18, 1999	467415	24.14
17	17	"Touched by an Angel"	Gail Mancuso	Dana Klein	February 25, 1999	467416	21.82
18	18	"Cecil, the Angry Postman"	Amanda Bearse	Greg Rice	March 4, 1999	467417	18.68
19	19	"The Parent Trap"	Kevin S. Bright	Dana Klein & April Pesa	March 11, 1999	467418	18.27
20	20	"Momma Was a Rollin' Stone"	Michael Lembeck	Dan Sterling	March 18, 1999	467419	20.03
21	21	"Finders Keepers"	Shelley Jensen	Matt Martin & Zachary Rosenblatt	March 25, 1999	467421	18.52
22	22	"I Do, I Think I Do"	Shelley Jensen	Story by : Jesse Allan; Teleplay by : Peter Murrieta & Gabrielle Allan	April 1, 1999	467420	17.33

=== Season 2 (1999–2000) ===
No. overall	No. in season	Title	Directed by	Written by	Original release date	Prod. code	U.S. viewers (millions)
23	1	"Jesse's New Job"	Gary Halvorson	Wil Calhoun	September 23, 1999	225751	21.25
24	2	"Driving Miss Jesse"	Kevin S. Bright	Danny Zuker	September 30, 1999	225752	18.60
25	3	"Students Get Flu, Carrie at Zoo, Monkey Throw Poo"	Joe Regalbuto	Dan Sterling	October 7, 1999	225753	17.19
26	4	"Everything But the Grill"	Andrew Tsao	David Hemingson	October 14, 1999	225754	16.75
27	5	"Jesse vs. Kurt"	Kevin S. Bright	Mark O'Keefe	October 21, 1999	225756	16.78
28	6	"Jesse's Flat Tire"	Andrew Tsao	Mark Wilding	November 4, 1999	225755	18.38
29	7	"A Woman's Prerogative: The Jesse Warner Story"	Shelley Jensen	Peter Murrieta & Gabrielle Allan	December 2, 1999	225757	14.73
30	8	"L'Eggo My Diego"	Alan Rafkin	Liz Astrof & Leslie Snyder	December 9, 1999	225758	15.85
31	9	"The Christmas Party"	Gary Halvorson	Nancy Steen	December 16, 1999	225760	19.42
32	10	"Jesse as Nurse, Fills In: Diego Throws Ice at Children"	Shelley Jensen	Dan Sterling	December 23, 1999	225759	13.01
33	11	"Kurt Slips, Niagara Falls"	Dana DeVally Piazza	Mark Wilding	January 6, 2000	225761	18.11
34	12	"Small Time Felon: The Jesse Warner Story, Part II"	Shelley Jensen	Peter Murrieta & Gabrielle Allan	January 13, 2000	225762	18.68
35	13	"The Rock"	Shelley Jensen	David Hemingson	January 20, 2000	225763	16.91
36	14	"Jesse Gives Birth"	Gary Halvorson	Liz Astrof & Leslie Snyder	February 3, 2000	225764	18.20
37	15	"My Boyfriend Went to Chile and All I Got Was This Lousy Moustache"	Gary Halvorson	Story by : Ethan Barnville; Teleplay by : Jake Farrow & Sarah McLaughlin	February 10, 2000	225766	17.47
38	16	"Jesse's Coat a Useful Crutch, Diego's Kitchen Not So Much"	Gary Halvorson	Dan Sterling	February 24, 2000	225765	17.56
39	17	"The Dump"	Gary Halvorson	Story by : Liz Astrof & Leslie Snyder; Teleplay by : Peter Murrieta & Gabrielle Allan	March 2, 2000	225767	15.57
40	18	"Diego's First Sleepover"	David Knoller	Nancy Steen	March 16, 2000	225768	14.48
41	19	"First Blood"	Gary Halvorson	Wil Calhoun	May 25, 2000	225769	9.40
42	20	"My Best Friend's Wedding"	Kevin S. Bright	Danny Zuker	May 25, 2000	225770	9.27
