= The Santa Clause 2 =

2002 film directed by Michael Lembeck

- Theatrical release poster
- Directed by: Michael Lembeck
- Screenplay by: Don Rhymer; Cinco Paul; Ken Daurio; Ed Decter; John J. Strauss
- Story by: Leo Benvenuti; Steve Rudnick
- Based on: The Santa Clause by Leo Benvenuti; Steve Rudnick
- Produced by: Robert Newmyer; Brian Reilly; Jeffrey Silver
- Starring: Tim Allen; Judge Reinhold; Wendy Crewson; Elizabeth Mitchell; David Krumholtz; Eric Lloyd; Spencer Breslin
- Cinematography: Adam Greenberg
- Edited by: David Finfer
- Music by: George S. Clinton
- Production companies: Walt Disney Pictures; Outlaw Productions; Boxing Cat Films
- Distributed by: Buena Vista Pictures Distribution
- Release dates: October 23, 2002 (Los Angeles); November 1, 2002 (United States)
- Running time: 104 minutes
- Country: United States
- Language: English
- Budget: $65 million
- Box office: $172.9 million

The Santa Clause 2 is a 2002 American Christmas fantasy comedy film directed by Michael Lembeck (in his feature directorial debut) and produced by Robert Newmyer, Brian Reilly, and Jeffrey Silver, from a screenplay written by Don Rhymer and the writing teams of Cinco Paul and Ken Daurio, and Ed Decter and John J. Strauss, based on a story by Leo Benvenuti and Steve Rudnick. It is the sequel to The Santa Clause (1994) and the second installment in The Santa Clause franchise. All of the principal actors from the first film, including Tim Allen, Eric Lloyd, Judge Reinhold, Wendy Crewson, and David Krumholtz, reprise their roles, and are joined by Elizabeth Mitchell, Spencer Breslin, and Liliana Mumy. Taking place eight years after the events of the first film, Scott Calvin (aka Santa) must return home to find a wife and keep his role while also dealing with his now-teenage son who has landed on the year's naughty list.

The Santa Clause 2 premiered at the El Capitan Theatre in Los Angeles on October 23, 2002, and was theatrically released in the United States by Buena Vista Pictures Distribution on November 1. The film received mixed reviews from critics and grossed $172.9 million worldwide on a $65 million budget. It was followed by another sequel, The Santa Clause 3: The Escape Clause, released in 2006.

== Plot ==
Eight years have passed since Scott Calvin took on the identity of Santa Claus. (Note: As depicted in The Santa Clause (1994)) Head Elf Bernard and Curtis, the Keeper of the Handbook of Christmas, inform Scott that there is another clause — the "Mrs. Clause". Scott is now pressed to get married before the next Christmas Eve or the clause will be broken, thus permanently ceasing his role as Santa.

Abby the Elf simultaneously tells Scott that his now-teenage son Charlie is on the naughty list, due to having vandalized his school to get attention. Scott must return to his home to search for a wife and set things right with Charlie. He brings this up when visited by the Council of Legendary Figures, consisting of Mother Nature, Father Time, Cupid, the Easter Bunny, the Tooth Fairy, and the Sandman.

To cover for his indefinite absence, Curtis helps Scott create a life-sized, animatronic doll clone of himself called Toy Santa, much to Bernard's horror. However, at Santa's request, Bernard reluctantly plays along with the gimmick, and tells the other elves that Santa had a makeover, so they will not question the double's synthetic appearance.

Because of the impending end of his contract, Scott undergoes a "de-Santafication process" that gradually turns him back into his former self. He has a limited amount of magic to help him. Scott returns home to his ex-wife Laura, her husband Neil, and Charlie. He and Charlie face the ire of school principal Carol Newman when Charlie defaces the lockers. Laura and Neil also now have a six-year-old daughter, Lucy, who is unaware that Scott is Santa Claus.

Back at the North Pole, Toy Santa follows the rulebook too literally and, with no sense of grace, slack, or mercy in his plastic heart, begins to assume every child in the world is naughty because of their small mistakes. As a result, he takes over the North Pole using giant toy soldiers he created himself and unveils his plan to the elves to give lumps of coal to the world. Bernard exposes Toy Santa as a fraud, and is under house arrest by the toy soldiers.

After a few failed dates, Scott finds himself falling for Carol. He accompanies her in a horse-drawn sleigh to the faculty Christmas party, during which she confesses she used to believe in Santa as a child, until she was forced to stop doing so by her parents after fighting with children who told her Santa was not real. Using a little of his Christmas magic, Scott enlivens the otherwise dull party by presenting everyone with their childhood dream gifts. He makes a special presentation to Carol, and, with his last remnant of magic, wins her over and they kiss under mistletoe.

However, when Scott attempts to explain to her that he is Santa, she believes that he is mocking her childhood, and throws him out. Later, Charlie is upset about Scott dating his principal and he confesses how hard it is for him that he is never around like other fathers, and reveals the pressure he is under to conceal the secret that his father is Santa. Lucy convinces Charlie not to be mad at him, which leads Charlie to convince Carol that Scott is Santa by showing her the magic snow globe he received during Scott's initial transformation.

Curtis flies in to tell Scott about Toy Santa's plan. However, Scott has used up the last of his magic wooing Carol, so cannot return to the North Pole. With help from the Tooth Fairy, Scott and Curtis manage to get back, only for Toy Santa to find them and tie them up. Charlie and Carol spring them free by summoning the Tooth Fairy to fly them to the North Pole.

Scott goes after Toy Santa, who has already left with the sleigh, riding Chet, a rambunctious reindeer-in-training, and they both crash back into the village. With an army of elves, Carol, Bernard, Charlie, and Curtis lead them into a snowball fight to overthrow the toy soldiers. Toy Santa is defeated and reduced to a six-inch height, Scott marries Carol in a ceremony, Scott transforms back into Santa and Carol becomes Mrs. Claus, and Christmas proceeds as it always has. Scott and Charlie reveal the truth to Lucy about Scott being Santa Claus, and she promises to keep his secret.

== Cast ==
- Tim Allen as Scott Calvin / Santa Claus and Toy Santa
- Eric Lloyd as Charlie Calvin
- Elizabeth Mitchell as Principal Carol Newman / Mrs. Claus
- David Krumholtz as Bernard the Head Elf
- Spencer Breslin as Curtis the Elf
- Liliana Mumy as Lucy Miller
- Judge Reinhold as Dr. Neil Miller
- Wendy Crewson as Laura Miller
- Danielle Woodman as Abby the Elf
- Aisha Tyler as Mother Nature
- Peter Boyle as Father Time
- Jay Thomas as Easter Bunny
- Kevin Pollak as Cupid
- Art LaFleur as Tooth Fairy
- Michael Dorn as Sandman
- Molly Shannon as Tracy

=== Reindeer voice cast ===
- Bob Bergen as Comet
- Kath Soucie as Chet

== Production ==
In July 2000, it was announced Disney intended to move forward with a sequel to The Santa Clause with the initial draft written by Don Rhymer where the North Pole is operating at maximum efficiency until Santa is confronted with the challenge of balancing work and personal life. Michael Lembeck became attached to direct in November of that year. In April 2001, Cinco Paul and Ken Daurio were brought on by Disney to pen another draft of the sequel. Tim Allen chose not to portray a role in The Cat in the Hat so that he could reprise his role as Scott Calvin.

The film was shot in Vancouver, British Columbia and at Mammoth Studios in Burnaby, British Columbia.

A teaser trailer for this film released with 102 Dalmatians and The Emperor's New Groove in late 2000 originally referred to it as Santa Clause 2: The Escape Clause, scheduled for release on November 21, 2001. The subtitle would later become the subtitle of the following sequel in 2006.

== Reception ==
=== Critical response ===
On Rotten Tomatoes, the film has an approval rating of 55% based on 121 reviews, with an average rating of 5.6/10. The site's critical consensus reads, "Though it's harmless as family entertainment and has moments of charm, The Santa Clause 2 is also predictable and forgettable." On Metacritic, which assigns a normalized rating to reviews, the film has a weighted average score of 48 out of 100, based on 26 critics, indicating "mixed or average reviews". Audiences polled by CinemaScore gave the film an average grade of "A" on an A+ to F scale.

Roger Ebert for the Chicago Sun-Times found it "more engaging, assured and funny" than the first film, with a "nice acerbic undertone". Keith Phipps for The A.V. Club wrote, "Despite the obviously mercenary nature of this sequel, there's a thimbleful of clever ideas at work here, most notably in the way Allen's RoboSanta begins to turn his toy factory into a tiny dictatorship." Claudia Puig called it a "trite, predictable rehash."

The Santa Clause 2 was nominated for a Saturn Award for Best Fantasy Film, but lost to The Lord of the Rings: The Two Towers.

=== Box office ===
During its opening weekend, The Santa Clause 2 generated $29 million, more than its predecessor, and was ranked in first place at the box office ahead of Jackass: The Movie, The Ring and I Spy. While the film was overtaken by 8 Mile a week later, it still made a total of $24.7 million. It would later go on to compete against Harry Potter and the Chamber of Secrets and Die Another Day. These three sequels would win the Thanksgiving weekend. The film would run strong at the box office while dominating Disney's other film Treasure Planet. The Santa Clause 2 grossed $139.2 million in the United States and Canada, and $33.6 million in other territories, for a total of $172.8 million, against a production budget of $65 million. It was the fifth-highest-grossing holiday movie.

== Soundtrack ==
The Santa Clause 2

Soundtrack album by various artists
- Released: November 5, 2002
- Genre: Soundtrack
- Length: 33:33
- Label: Walt Disney Records
- Producer: George S. Clinton

No.	Title	Writer(s)	Length
1.	"Everybody Loves Christmas"	Eddie Money & Ronnie Spector	4:02
2.	"Santa Claus Lane"	Hilary Duff	2:42
3.	"Santa's Got a Brand New Bag"	SHeDAISY	3:08
4.	"Jingle Bells"	Brian Setzer	2:21
5.	"Run Rudolph Run"	Chuck Berry	2:43
6.	"Zat You Santa Claus?"	Louis Armstrong	2:50
7.	"Santa Claus Is Comin' to Town"	Smokey Robinson & the Miracles	1:50
8.	"Blue Holiday"	The Shirelles	3:20
9.	"Unwritten Christmas"	Unwritten Law and Sum 41	3:52
10.	"I'm Gonna Lasso Santa Claus"	Brenda Lee	2:16
11.	"Santa Claus Is Comin' to Town"	Steve Tyrell	2:09
12.	"North Pole (Score)"	George S. Clinton	2:20
Total length:			33:33

== Home media ==
The Santa Clause 2 was released on DVD and VHS on November 18, 2003. The DVD release is THX certified and consists of widescreen and pan and scan fullscreen versions. Along with the other two Santa Clause films, it was re-released in a 3-Movie Collection DVD set in 2007 and a 3-Movie Collection Blu-ray set on October 16, 2012.

== See also ==
- List of Christmas films
- Santa Claus in film
