= Eric Lloyd =

American actor

- Born: David Eric Lloyd Morelli; May 19, 1986 (age 40); Glendale, California, U.S.
- Occupation: Actor
- Years active: 1989–present
- Parent(s): David Morelli and Melissa Lloyd Rogers

David Eric Lloyd Morelli (born May 19, 1986 in Glendale, California) is an American actor. He is best known for work as a child actor in such roles as Charlie Calvin in Disney's The Santa Clause film trilogy and the follow-up series The Santa Clauses, as well as "Little John" Warner in the NBC television series Jesse, and Kyle Grant in Dunston Checks In.

== Career ==
His television career began when, between ages two and five, he was cast as a young Kevin Arnold (Fred Savage) in episodes of The Wonder Years. His film credits include Batman & Robin, Dunston Checks In, Deconstructing Harry, My Giant, The Brave Little Toaster Goes to Mars, and The Brave Little Toaster to the Rescue.

In 1996, the Fort Worth Star-Telegram wrote, "Eric Lloyd is a few years shy of adolescence, but already he has the credentials of a veteran actor," stating that at that time his biggest role was in The Santa Clause, but that his role in Dunston Checks In put him "back in the thick of things".

In 2014, Lloyd opened Lloyd Production Studios. LP Studios is a production and post-production music and film space located in Glendale, California.

== Filmography ==
=== Film ===
Year	Title	Role	Notes
1993	Sunny's Deliverance	David	Short
1993	Heart and Souls	7-year-old Thomas Reilly	
1994	Greedy	7-year-old Joe McTeague	
1994	The Santa Clause	Charlie Calvin	
1996	Dunston Checks In	Kyle Grant	
1997	The Brave Little Toaster to the Rescue	Blanky	Voice; direct-to-video
1997	The Spittin' Image	Wally	Short
1997	Batman & Robin	Young Bruce Wayne	
1997	Deconstructing Harry	Hilliard "Hilly" Block	
1998	My Giant	Young Sammy Kamin	
1998	The Brave Little Toaster Goes to Mars	Blanky	Voice; direct-to-video
1998	Luminous Motion	Phillip	
2002	The Santa Clause 2	Charlie Calvin	
2006	The Santa Clause 3: The Escape Clause	Charlie Calvin	
2011	ChromeSkull: Laid to Rest 2	Geeky Worker	

=== Television ===
Year	Title	Role	Notes
1989	The Wonder Years	Young Kevin Arnold	Episode: "Brightwing"
1992	Laurie Hill	Leo Hill	10 episodes
1993	A Family Torn Apart	Chris Hannigan	Television film
1993	Love & War	Johnny	Episode: "I Love a Parade"
1994	In the Best of Families: Marriage, Pride & Madness	Young John Lynch	Television film
1994	Seasons of the Heart	David	Television film
1995	Abandoned and Deceived	Matthew	Television film
1996–1997	The Oz Kids	Neddie Hugson	Voice
1997	A Christmas Memory	Buddy	Television film
1998	Chameleon	Ghen	Television film
1998–2000	Jesse	"Little John" Warner	41 episodes
2000	Rocket Power	Josh	Episode: "All About Sam/Half Twister"
2001	ER	Martin Leanly	Episode: "Rampage"
2011	About Abby	Xander Falls	2 episodes
2012	True Perfection	Kyle	Miniseries
2017	Weedland	Garret Walker	TV Pilot
2020	Comic Conventions	Manny (white)	TV short
2022	The Santa Clauses	Charlie Calvin	Episode: "Chapter Two: The Secessus Clause"
2024	The Floor	Himself, contestant	Episode: "They Rise & They Fall"
2025	Weakest Link	Himself, contestant	Episode: "Holiday Heroes"

=== Video games ===
Year	Title	Voice role	Notes
1996	Goosebumps: Escape from Horrorland	Clay	

== Awards and nominations ==
- 1993, Nominated for Young Artist Award for Outstanding Actor Under Ten in a Television Series for Laurie Hill
- 1994, Nominated for Young Artist Award for Best Actor Under Ten in a Motion Picture for Heart and Souls
- 1994, Nominated for Young Artist Award for Best Performance by a Young Actor Co-Starring in a Motion Picture for The Santa Clause
- 1995, Nominated for Young Artist Award for Best Performance by a Youth Actor in a TV Mini-Series or Special for Seasons of the Heart
- 1997, Nominated for Young Artist Award for Best Performance in a Feature Film – Actor Age Ten or Under for Dunston Checks In
- 1998, Nominated for Young Artist Award for Best Performance in a TV Movie/Pilot/Mini-Series – Young Actor Age Ten or Under for A Christmas Memory
- 1999, Nominated for Young Artist Award for Best Performance in a TV Movie/Pilot/Mini-Series or Series – Supporting Young Actor for Chameleon
- 1999, Won Young Artist Award for Best Performance in a TV Comedy Series – Supporting Young Actor for Jesse
- 1999, Nominated for The Hollywood Reporter Young Star Award for Best Performance by a Young Actor in a Comedy TV Series for Jesse
- 2000, Nominated for Young Artist Award for Best Performance in a TV Comedy Series – Supporting Young Actor for Jesse
- 2000, Nominated for The Hollywood Reporter Young Star Award for Best Young Actor/Performance in a Comedy TV Series for Jesse
- 2003, Nominated for Young Artist Award for Best Performance in a Feature Film – Supporting Young Actor for The Santa Clause 2: The Mrs. Clause
- 2007, Nominated for Young Artist Award for Best Young Ensemble in a Feature Film for The Santa Clause 3: The Escape Clause
