= Kicking & Screaming (2005 film) =

- Theatrical release poster
- Directed by: Jesse Dylan
- Written by: Leo Benvenuti; Steve Rudnick
- Produced by: Jimmy Miller
- Starring: Will Ferrell; Robert Duvall; Kate Walsh; Mike Ditka
- Cinematography: Lloyd Ahern II
- Edited by: Stuart H. Pappé; Peter Teschner
- Music by: Mark Isham
- Production company: Mosaic Media Group
- Distributed by: Universal Pictures
- Release dates: May 1, 2005 (Universal City); May 13, 2005 (United States)
- Running time: 95 minutes
- Country: United States
- Language: English
- Budget: $45 million
- Box office: $56.1 million

Kicking & Screaming is a 2005 American sports comedy film directed by Jesse Dylan and written by Leo Benvenuti and Steve Rudnick. The film stars Will Ferrell and Robert Duvall as a father and son who exploit their own sons' soccer teams to try to beat the other. Mike Ditka, Kate Walsh, and Josh Hutcherson also star. It premiered at Universal City on May 1, 2005 and was released by Universal Pictures on May 13, 2005, to mixed reviews and grossed $56.1 million worldwide against a $45 million budget.

== Plot ==
Phil Weston is an average person who had endured his father Buck Weston's over-competitiveness throughout his childhood, an upbringing which has left permanent mental scars. Now middle-aged and married to Barbara, with a young son named Sam, Phil runs a small vitamin store, while Buck operates a local chain of sports stores.

Buck is the coach of the Gladiators, the most successful little-league soccer team in the district. Sam is on Buck's team, but Buck keeps him on the bench, a humiliation he also visited upon his son decades prior. Buck eventually transfers Sam to the Tigers, the league's worst team.

At Sam's first game with his new team, their coach is absent. Rather than forfeit, Phil offers to coach the team, a position he takes up permanently. However, despite Phil's best efforts, the team does not seem to improve. In desperation, Phil recruits Mike Ditka, Buck's neighbor and hated enemy. Enticed by the opportunity to beat Buck, Ditka accepts the position. Despite grueling training, the team continues to lose.

Ditka introduces Phil to two exceptionally talented Italian boys working in a local butcher's shop. Phil succeeds in gaining their uncle's permission for them to play for the Tigers. They have an immediate impact, scoring repeatedly. The resulting winning streak makes them serious contenders in the league.

After Phil boasts about the Tigers potentially reaching the finals, he and Buck make a bet: if the Gladiators win then Phil would sell his store and work for Buck. If the Tigers win then Buck would hand over his most prized possession, 'The Pelé Ball', a soccer ball struck by the famous player which Phil caught as a child and Buck took from him.

Meanwhile, Ditka also introduces Phil to coffee, which rapidly changes him from a mild-mannered caring dad to an obnoxious, egotistical, over-competitive coach, not unlike his father, abusing kids and parents alike. The team's mantra becomes "Get the ball to the Italians", which, though effective, demoralizes the team. In the ultimate over-competitive act, he benches his son for the entire semi-final game.

The Tigers make it to the finals, where they face off against the Gladiators. At half-time, the score is 2–1 to the Gladiators. In a heart-to-heart discussion with his son, Phil realizes the error of his ways. He tells his team to do exactly the opposite of what he taught them.

Although the Gladiators score one more goal after half-time, the Tigers do not give up hope. Phil gives the goalie a vision test with glasses from the crowd. From there, Ambrose scores one goal—making the score 3–2. After another goal, the score is tied. The team rallies and produces a spectacular team performance to win 4–3, with Sam scoring the winning goal against his paternal half-uncle Bucky, (Buck's child from his second wife Janice and Phil's much younger paternal half-brother, who was born on the exact same day as Sam) using a move that he practiced when his dad benched him in the semi-finals.

Honoring the bet, Buck tries to give Phil the ball, but Phil refuses. Making peace with his father, they merge their businesses, realizing there is more to life than winning.

The film ends with an adapted version of the "He's Got Balls" commercial originally produced by Buck. In it, the entire Tigers and Gladiators team appear, announcing the merger of Phil's vitamin shop—Phil's Pills—and Buck's Sporting Goods Store. The team shouts, after the "He's got balls" line, "And vitamins."

== Cast ==
- Will Ferrell as Phil Weston (the new coach of Team Tigers)
- Robert Duvall as Buck Weston, Phil's father (the coach of Team Gladiators)
- Mike Ditka as Himself
- Kate Walsh as Barbara Weston, Phil's wife
- Josh Hutcherson as Bucky Weston, Buck & Janice's son and Phil's younger paternal half-brother (the #10 of Team Gladiators)
- Steven Anthony Lawrence as Mark Avery (the #5 of Team Tigers)
- Dylan McLaughlin as Sam Weston, Phil & Barbara's son (the former #13 of Team Gladiators later #2 of Team Tigers from New Recruit)
- Jeremy Bergman as Hunter Davidson (the #9 of Team Tigers)
- Elliot Cho as Byong Sun Hogan-Jones (the #6 of Team Tigers)
- Dallas McKinney as Connor Ryan (the #1 of Team Tigers on Goalie)
- Rachael Harris as Ann Hogan, Byong Sun's adoptive mother
- Dave Herman as Referee
- Musetta Vander as Janice Weston, Buck's second wife and Phil's stepmother
- Laura Kightlinger as Donna Jones, Byong Sun's other adoptive mother
- Erik Walker as Ambrose Hanna (the #4 of Team Tigers)
- Jim Turner as Jim Davidson "The Captain", Hunter's father
- Francesco Liotti as Gian Piero, Massimo's fraternal twin brother (the #7 of Team Tigers from New Recruit)
- Alessandro Ruggiero as Massimo, Gian Piero's fraternal twin brother (the #11 of Team Tigers from New Recruit)
- Sammy Fine as Jack Watson (the #8 of Team Tigers)
- Timmy Deters as Alex Hartley (the #3 of Team Tigers)
- Julia Campbell as Janet Davidson, Hunter's mother
- Phill Lewis as John Ryan, Connor's father
- David Bowe as Forest Avery, Mark's father
- Matt Winston as Tom Hanna, Ambrose's father
- Joseph R. Sicari as Umberto, Gian Piero & Massimo's uncle
- Karly Rothenberg as Mrs. Watson, Jack's mother
- Timm Sharp as Butcher shop employee
- Jarrad Paul as a Beantown employee
- Robert Patrick Benedict as a Beantown employee
- Martin Starr as Beantown customer
- Lisa Lackey as Beantown customer
- Brian Palermo as Beantown customer
- Scott Adsit as Stew
- Peter Jason as Clark
- Alex Borstein as Obnoxious Hummer Lady (uncredited)

== Production ==
In April 2003, it was reported that Universal Pictures had bought a soccer themed pitch from writers Leo Benvenuti and Steve Rudnick starring Will Ferrell citing the success of Old School as a reason for the swift acquisition. Marco Schnabel, who had previously worked as a second unit director for Jay Roach on the Austin Powers films and Meet the Parents, was initially hired to make his directorial debut with this film, but he was ultimately replaced with Jesse Dylan and Schnabel instead made his directing debut with 2008's The Love Guru. In October 2003, Robert Duvall joined the cast to star alongside Ferrell.

== Reception ==
=== Critical response ===
On Rotten Tomatoes, the film holds an approval rating of 41% based on 139 reviews, and an average rating of 5.5/10. The web site's critical consensus reads, "The script is mediocre and fails to give Ferrell a proper comedic showcase." On Metacritic, the film has a weighted average score of 45 out of 100, based on 33 critics, indicating "mixed or average" reviews. Audiences polled by CinemaScore gave the film an average grade of "B" on an A+ to F scale.

Roger Ebert gave the film 3 out of 4 stars, saying that it was "an entertaining family movie". Scott Foundas of Variety called it "An immensely likable, funny comedy that finds a novel approach to that familiar combo of kids and sports." Christy Lemire, writing for the Associated Press, praised Ferrell's acting, stating that "if you just can't wait until July for the remake of The Bad News Bears starring Billy Bob Thornton, now you have Kicking & Screaming, which is the exact same idea on the soccer field, starring Will Ferrell."

=== Box office ===
The film grossed $20.2 million in its opening weekend, finishing in 2nd place behind fellow newcomer Monster-in-Law ($23.1 million).

Kicking & Screaming earned $52.8 million in the U.S. and Canada, and $3.2 million in other territories for a worldwide total of $56.1 million, against a production budget of $45 million. Kicking & Screaming became the highest grossing soccer movie in the US, beating Bend It Like Beckham which grossed $32.5 million.

=== Awards and nominations ===
==== Golden Raspberry Awards ====
- Will Ferrell nominated for Worst Actor (also for Bewitched)

==== Teen Choice Awards ====
- Choice Movie, Actor: Ferrell nominated for Comedy (also for Anchorman: The Legend of Ron Burgundy)
- Choice Movie, Hissy Fit: Ferrell
- 2005: Choice Movie Sleazebag: Ferrell

== See also ==
- List of association football films
