= Queen Bees (film) =

2021 film by Michael Lembeck

- Theatrical release poster
- Directed by: Michael Lembeck
- Written by: Donald Martin
- Produced by: Fred Bernstein; Harrison Powell; Dominique Telson
- Starring: Ellen Burstyn; James Caan; Ann-Margret; Christopher Lloyd; Jane Curtin; Loretta Devine; Elizabeth Mitchell
- Cinematography: Alice Brooks
- Edited by: Sabine Hoffman
- Music by: Walter Murphy
- Production company: Astute Films
- Distributed by: Gravitas Ventures
- Release date: June 11, 2021
- Running time: 100 minutes
- Country: United States
- Language: English
- Budget: $5 million
- Box office: $2.3 million

Queen Bees is a 2021 American romantic comedy film directed by Michael Lembeck. It features an ensemble cast, including Ellen Burstyn, James Caan (in his final film released during his lifetime), Ann-Margret, Christopher Lloyd, Jane Curtin, Loretta Devine, and Elizabeth Mitchell. It was released on June 11, 2021, by Gravitas Ventures, and received mixed reviews from critics. Screenwriter Donald Martin was nominated for a 2022 Humanitas Prize for his screenplay.

== Plot ==
Fiercely independent senior Helen is under pressure from her daughter Laura to move into Pine Grove retirement community. The widowed Helen opposes this, but has little option after she locks herself out of her home—again—while a fire from her cooking destroys her kitchen. Repairs will take at least a month, and she moves temporarily into Pine Grove.

At Pine Grove, Helen initially has trouble fitting into a social scene dominated by the Queen Bees, led by Janet, and by the few unattached males, such as Arthur. Her mother's loneliness dismays Laura, a real estate agent who has connections to the owners of the real estate Pine Grove would like to expand onto, and she threatens facility manager Ken that if her mother does not fit in, the real estate will be sold to another potential buyer. After the sudden death of a bridge partner, Queen Bee Sally gives Helen a chance as her replacement. With bridge to interest her, and a growing relationship with a new resident, Dan Simpson, Helen begins to feel more at home.

Helen becomes close to Sally, and when Helen suggests the facility is just like high school, Sally reminds her it is worse: high school eventually ends with graduation and the start of adult life, whereas Pine Grove's residents have only death or medical deterioration in front of them. Still, Helen is reluctant to let the relationship with Dan progress far, as she feels loyal to the memory of her late husband, which also makes her unwilling to sell the family home. Janet remains hostile to Helen, and after witnessing Ken and Dan arguing, and Ken threatening the older man that an agreement they have made will be exposed to Helen, Janet learns that Ken has hired Dan, a retired staff member of one of Pine Grove's rivals, to move in and make Helen more accepting of the life there. Helen earns the friendship of Janet (who has been abandoned by her family) by arranging a surprise birthday party for her, but by then Janet has already told Laura who Dan is, and she tells her mother. Convinced that Dan has only been nice to her because he has been paid to be, Helen breaks off their relationship.

Learning that Dan has been kicked out of the community and has returned his salary, Helen reconsiders, but when she goes to Dan's forwarding address, finds a woman there. The two reconcile when Helen learns the woman is his sister and Dan professes his love for Helen. The couple marries. Helen sells her house, and the two will reside at Pine Grove.

== Cast ==
- Ellen Burstyn as Helen Wilson, Laura's mother and Peter's grandmother
- Jane Curtin as Janet Poindexter
- Loretta Devine as Sally Hanson
- Ann-Margret as Margot Clark
- Christopher Lloyd as Arthur Lane
- James Caan as Dan Simpson, Helen's love interest
- Alec Mapa as Lito Santos
- French Stewart as Ken DeNardo
- Matthew Barnes as Peter Crane, Helen's grandson and Laura's son
- Ricky Russert as Pablo Leon
- Elizabeth Mitchell as Laura Wilson Crane, Helen's daughter and Peter's mother

== Production ==
The film was announced with the working title Welcome to Pine Grove! in July 2018, with Ellen Burstyn and James Caan cast. The supporting cast was set in August, with filming commencing in Atlanta.

== Release ==
In April 2021, Gravitas Ventures acquired U.S. distribution rights to the film, and set it for a June 11, 2021, release.

== Reception ==
=== Box office ===
The film made $375,232 from 500 theaters in its opening weekend, finishing in ninth. It made $284,000 in its second weekend.

=== Critical response ===
On the review aggregator website Rotten Tomatoes, 55% of 31 critics' reviews are positive, with an average rating of 5.5/10. The website's consensus reads: "Queen Bees gives some phenomenal actors a too-rare chance to take center stage—it's just a shame about that patchy script." Metacritic, which uses a weighted average, assigned the film a score of 52 out of 100, based on 7 critics, indicating "mixed or average" reviews.
