= Robert Newmyer =

American film producer

- Born: May 30, 1956; Washington, D.C., United States
- Died: December 12, 2005 (aged 49); Toronto, Ontario, Canada

Robert F. Newmyer (May 30, 1956 – December 12, 2005) was an American film producer, both commercial and independent.

== Biography ==
Robert Frederick Newmyer (Bobby) was born on May 30, 1956, in Washington, D.C., to James and Virginia Newmyer. He graduated from Sidwell Friends School in 1974, and received a bachelor's degree in economics from Swarthmore College in 1978 and afterward worked as a real estate developer in Telluride, Colorado. In 1982 he received a master's degree in business administration from Harvard Business School in 1982.

According to long-time friend, documentary filmmaker Eames Yates, "Just before he graduated, he saw Spielberg's E.T.' and he came out and said, 'That's what I want to do'." Newmyer went on to hold a variety of positions at Columbia Pictures, before becoming a vice president of production and acquisitions. Among his acquisitions in that role, he bought The Adventures of Milo and Otis for Columbia and supervised its American version.

Newmyer's first film as a producer was Sex, Lies, and Videotape (1989), written and directed by first-time filmmaker Steven Soderbergh. The movie went on to win the Audience Award at the Sundance Film Festival and the Palme d'Or at the Cannes Film Festival, grossing over $24 million on a budget just over $1 million. Soderbergh later recalled that "It was Bob who thought maybe I had something that more than ten people would see."

Newmyer and Jeffrey Silver then formed "Outlaw Productions", the name derived from Newmyer's favorite Clint Eastwood character, The Outlaw Josey Wales. The production company had, for a time, a long-term deal with Warner Brothers. Chairwoman of Sony Motion Pictures Group, Amy Pascal said,"Bobby was a true maverick and a true risk-taker.

== Personal life ==
Newmyer was married to wife Deborah Jelin Newmyer for nineteen years. They had four children, Sofi, Teddy, James and Billi, all of Los Angeles; his parents, and his two sisters, Elsa Newmyer of the District of Columbia and Lory Newmyer of Hull, Massachusetts.

Paramount producer, Lorenzo di Bonaventura, who worked with Newmyer at Warner Bros., recalled Newmyer's love of whitewater rafting, "Bobby looked at movies as he looked at life: with a great sense of passion and a great sense of risk-taking."

== Death ==
On December 12, 2005, Newmyer died at the age of 49 in Toronto, Ontario. Newmyer, a lifelong asthmatic, had a heart attack triggered by asthma, while working out in a health club. He was on location working on the film Breach (2007).

In addition to the film Breach, at the time of his death, Newmyer had The Santa Clause 3: The Escape Clause in production, and Phat Girlz in postproduction. To finance the romantic comedy Phat Girlz, he put up nearly $3 million of his own money, liquidating assets and remortgaging his homes. According to his obituary in The New York Times, he said "I do find it terrifying and I would say, in waves, I am feeling, experiencing phenomenal stress for the past five or six months. I will clearly stay on this track until we finish this movie, exhibit it and it's sold to a distributor."

== Legacy ==
Newmyer also had in development of a movie about the young boys forced to flee war-torn and famine-ridden Sudan, an idea that arose from a segment on 60 Minutes. He became an advocate for the young Sudanese immigrants, providing temporary accommodations for some of them in his home. Some of "the Lost Boys" gave the eulogy at his funeral. The Lost Boys of Sudan was in development for Paramount Pictures. (It was eventually released in 2014 by Warner Bros. as The Good Lie).

The Bobby Newmyer Memorial Fund was established to further his work with Sudanese refugees.

== Awards ==
- 1990 Independent Spirit Award (with John Hardy) for Sex, Lies, and Videotape (1989).

== Outlaw Productions ==
Outlaw Productions is an American film production company founded in 1987 by the late Robert Newmyer and Jeffrey Silver. They have produced independent films as well as major studio features. In 2015, the President was Newmyer's widow, Deb Newmyer, an independent movie and television producer in her own right, who worked at Steven Spielberg's Amblin Entertainment for 12 years. In 2006, Deb Newmyer and her Outlaw company received a first look deal with Sony.

== Filmography ==
He was a producer in all films unless otherwise noted.

=== Film ===
Year	Film	Credit	Notes
1989	Sex, Lies, and Videotape		
1991	Don't Tell Mom the Babysitter's Dead		
1992	Crossing the Bridge		
1992	Mr. Baseball		
1992	The Opposite Sex and How to Live with Them		
1993	Indian Summer		
1994	Wagons East		
1994	Don Juan DeMarco	Co-executive producer	
1994	The Santa Clause		
1995	Born to Be Wild		
1997	Addicted to Love		
1997	How to Be a Player	Executive producer	
1998	Dennis the Menace Strikes Again		Direct-to-video
1999	Three to Tango		
2000	Ready to Rumble		
2000	Gossip		
2001	Training Day		
2002	The Santa Clause 2		
2003	National Security		
2004	If Only		
2004	Mindhunters		
2005	The Thing About My Folks		Final film as a producer
2006	Phat Girlz		Posthumous credit
2006	The Santa Clause 3: The Escape Clause		Posthumous credit
2007	Breach		Posthumous credit
2008	27 Dresses	Executive producer	Posthumous credit
2008	Leatherheads	Executive producer	Posthumous credit
2014	The Good Lie	Executive producer	Posthumous credit

As an actor

Year	Film	Role
1991	Don't Tell Mom the Babysitter's Dead	Mortuary Worker

Thanks

Year	Film	Role
2006	Behind the Mask: The Rise of Leslie Vernon	The director would like to personally thank
2006	The Santa Clause 3: The Escape Clause	In memory of
2007	Breach	In memory of
2016	Everything But a Man	Dedicate
