= Michael Lembeck =

American actor & director (born 1948)

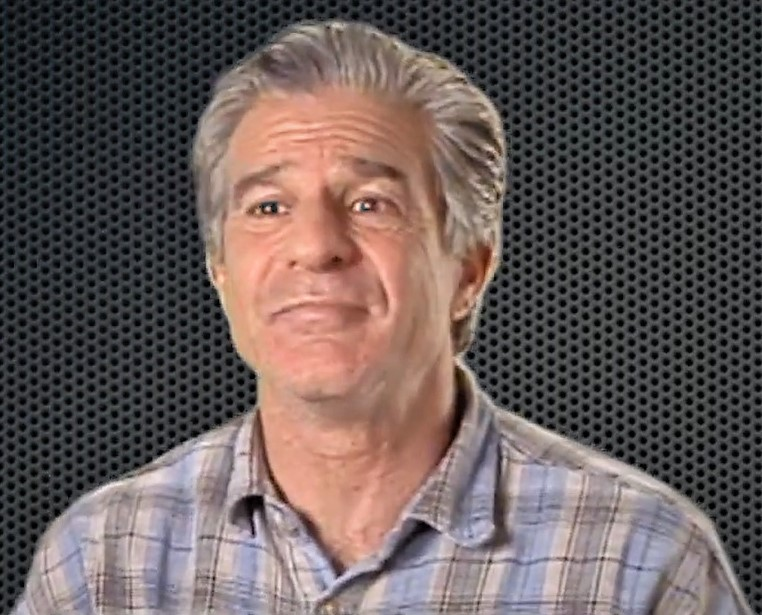
- Born: June 25, 1948 (age 78); Brooklyn, New York City, U.S.
- Occupations: Actor, film director
- Years active: 1968–present
- Spouse(s): Barbara Deutsch (m. 1977; div. 19??) Lorna Patterson (m. 1990)
- Children: 2
- Relatives: Harvey Lembeck (father); Helaine Lembeck (sister)

Michael Lembeck (born June 25, 1948) is an American actor and television and film director. He is best known as Max Horvath in One Day at a Time (1979–1984).

== Life and career ==
Lembeck was born in Brooklyn, New York, the son of Caroline Dubs and Harvey Lembeck, an actor and comedian. His parents practiced the Jewish faith. He graduated from Beverly Hills High School in 1966. He began acting in the late 1960s and directing in the 1970s.

His most notable acting role was as Julie Cooper (Mackenzie Phillips)'s husband, Max Horvath, on the sitcom One Day at a Time. He played newscaster Clete Meizenheimer on the series Mary Hartman, Mary Hartman.

In 1975, he appeared on Barney Miller in the episode "Hair" as Officer Guardeno. He also played Kaptain Kool of the fictional band Kaptain Kool and the Kongs on The Krofft Supershow from 1976 to 1978. He is also known for his role as Vinnie Fazio in The Boys in Company C in 1978. He was a member of the cast of the 1985–1986 situation comedy Foley Square. He appeared with his father, actor Harvey Lembeck, in an episode of The Partridge Family in 1971.

Lembeck has had collaborations with actor Peter Boyle (with whom he had previously appeared as an actor in Conspiracy: The Trial of the Chicago 8) in both The Santa Clause 2 and its sequel The Santa Clause 3: The Escape Clause. Lembeck also directed Boyle in a number of episodes of Everybody Loves Raymond.

Lembeck's first film appearance came in the 1968 film Hang 'Em High where he portrays “Marvin,” a store clerk with two spoken lines, in which he asks the proprietor where to store blankets. He later acted in The In-Laws. He directed The Santa Clause 2 and The Santa Clause 3: The Escape Clause, as well as the Nia Vardalos film Connie and Carla and Tooth Fairy.

Lembeck now works as a full-time film and TV director. He won an Emmy for his work on the Friends episode "The One After the Superbowl", which was also the most-viewed episode of the series. He also directed 20 other episodes of the series.

== Personal life ==
Lembeck married actress Barbara Deutsch in July 1977. He is now married to retired actress Lorna Patterson. They have raised two children.

== Awards ==
Lembeck's work has received recognition from the Directors Guild of America, and the Academy of Television Arts and Sciences (also known as the ATAS).

- 1996 Won - Primetime Emmy award for Outstanding Directing for a Comedy Series ("The One After the Superbowl") (Friends)
- 1999 Nominated - Primetime Emmy award for Outstanding Directing for a Comedy Series ("The One Where Everybody Finds Out") (Friends)
- 2000 Nominated - Primetime Emmy award for Outstanding Directing for a Comedy Series ("The One That Could Have Been (Part 1 & 2)") (Friends)
- 2012 Nominated - Directors Guild award for Outstanding Directorial Achievement in Children's Programs (Sharpay's Fabulous Adventure)
- 2017 Nominated - Directors Guild award for Outstanding Directorial Achievement in Children's Programs (A Nutcracker Christmas)

== Filmography ==
=== Film ===
- The Santa Clause 2 (2002)
- Connie and Carla (2004)
- The Santa Clause 3: The Escape Clause (2006)
- Tooth Fairy (2010)
- Queen Bees (2021)
- The J Team (2021)

Direct-to-video

- The Clique (2008)
- Sharpay's Fabulous Adventure (2011) (Also co-producer)

==== Acting roles ====
Year	Title	Role	Notes
1968	Hang 'Em High	Store Clerk	uncredited
1969	Gidget Grows Up	Arnold	TV movie
1972	Haunts of the Very Rich	Johnny Delmonico	TV movie
1973	A Summer Without Boys	Burt	TV movie
1973	Blood Sport	Rueben	TV movie
1975	It's a Bird...It's a Plane...It's Superman	Joe	TV movie
1976	Flannery and Quilt	Quilt's Grandson	TV movie
1976	ABC's Saturday Sneak Peek	Kaptain Kool	TV movie
1977	Kaptain Kool and the Kongs Present ABC All-Star Saturday	Kaptain Kool	TV movie
1978	The Boys in Company C	Vinnie Fazio	
1978	Having Babies III	Russ Bridges	TV movie
1978	The Krofft Comedy Hour	Kaptain Kool	TV movie
1978	The Bay City Rollers Meet the Saturday Superstars	Kaptain Kool	TV movie
1979	The In-Laws	Tommy Ricardo	
1980	The Comeback Kid	Tony	TV movie
1980	Gorp	Kavell	
1980	Dan August: Once Is Never Enough		TV movie
1981	On the Right Track	Frank Biscardi	
1982	Goodbye Doesn't Mean Forever	Elliott Garfield	TV movie
1987	Conspiracy: The Trial of the Chicago 8	Abbie Hoffman	TV movie
1987	Ultraman: The Adventure Begins	Scott Masterson (voice role)	TV movie
1988	Side by Side (1988 film)	Tony Mercer	TV movie
1988	Lady Mobster	unknown	TV movie
1989	The Dream Team	Ed	
1990	Joseph and His Brothers		Voice role, Short Film
1993	Heartbeat	Ted	TV movie

=== Television ===
TV movies

- Acting Sheriff (1991)
- Boys & Girls (1996)
- Carly (1998)
- True Love (1999)
- The Peter Principle (2000)
- From Where I Sit (2000)
- Loomis (2001)
- Untitled Oakley & Weinstein Project (2005)
- So Here's What Happened (2006)
- The Bling Ring (2011)
- Homeboys (2013)
- A Nutcracker Christmas (2016)
- Snow Day (2022)

TV series

==== Director ====
Year	Title	Notes
1989	Doctor Doctor	2 episodes
1989	My Two Dads	Episode "I'm Dreaming of a Holiday Episode"
1989	Coming of Age	3 episodes
1989–1990	Coach	7 episodes
1990	Sugar and Spice	Episode "Breaking in Is Hard to Do"
1990	The Marshall Chronicles	2 episodes
1992	Flying Blind	5 episodes
1990–1993	Major Dad	67 episodes
1993–1994	Love & War	16 episodes
1994	Good Advice	4 episodes
1994–1999	Mad About You	23 episodes
1995	Pride & Joe	Episode "Terror at 30,000 Feet"
1995	High Society	Episode "Family Val's"
1995	NewsRadio	3 episodes
1995	Double Rush	13 episodes
1995–2000	Friends	24 episodes
1995–1996	Hope & Gloria	8 episodes
1996	The Naked Truth	Episode "Man Loses Load While Woman Can't Dump!"
1996	Party Girl	
1996	Caroline in the City	Episode "Caroline and the Cat Dancer"
1996	Ellen	Episode "Harold and Ellen"
1996–1997	Everybody Loves Raymond	5 episodes
1997	Men Behaving Badly	Episode "It's Good to Be Dead"
1997	Chicago Sons	2 episodes
1997	Over the Top	10 episodes
1997–1999	Veronica's Closet	4 episodes
1998	House Rules	Episode "Pilot"
1998	That's Life	Episode "The First One"
1998	Encore! Encore!	Episode "The French Connection"
1998–2001	Two Guys, a Girl and a Pizza Place	22 episodes
1999	Jesse	2 episodes
1999-2000	Stark Raving Mad	2 episodes
2000	The Weber Show	2 episodes
2001	What About Joan	4 episodes
2001	Inside Schwartz	Episode "Event Night"
2001	Off Centre	Episode "A Stroke of Genius"
2001	According to Jim	Episode "Cheryl's Old Flame"
2003	The 5 Coolest Things	Documentary miniseries
2007	Greek	Episode "Liquid Courage"
2007	Californication	Episode "Fear and Loathing at the Fundraiser"
2010	Hot in Cleveland	Episode "Pilot"
2012–2013	Guys with Kids	5 episodes
2012–2017	Baby Daddy	97 episodes (director); 35 episodes (executive producer)
2014	Mystery Girls	4 episodes
2015	Mr. Robinson	Episode "Ain't Nothin' But a Hound Dog"
2017	One Day at a Time	Episode "Sex Talk"

==== Acting roles ====
Year	Title	Role	Notes
1970	The Young Lovers	Student	Episode "A Simple Thing Called Justice"
1970–1974	Room 222	Mickey Kaufman	3 episodes
1971	Dan August	Ron	Episode "Death Chain"
1971	The Partridge Family	Marc	Episode "To Play or Not to Play?"
1971	Make Room for Granddaddy	Peter	Episode "The Greatest Ear in the Business"
1971	The Funny Side	Teenage Husband	14 episodes
1972	Haunts of the Very Rich	Johnny Delmonico	ABC Movie of the Week
1973	A Summer Without Boys	Burt	ABC Movie of the Week
1973	Love, American Style	Bob	Segment "Love and the Mind Reader"
1975	Happy Days	Dooley	Episode "Crusin' "
1975	Baretta	Phil	Episode "The Coppelli Oath"
1975	Barney Miller	Detective Paul Gardeno	Episode "Hair"
1975	The Rookies	Gene/Maury	2 episodes
1976	The Krofft Supershow	Kaptain Kool	32 episodes
1976–1977	Mary Hartman, Mary Hartman	Clete Meizenheimer	39 episodes
1977	The Brady Bunch Variety Hour	Kaptain Kool	Episode "#1.1"
1978	What Really Happened to the Class of '65?	Nick Romansky	Episode "Class Clown"
1978	The Bay City Roller Show	Kaptain Kool	Episode "#1.1"
1979–1983	The Love Boat	Joey/ Bill Burgess	5 episodes/S6 E7 "Too Many Dads" (1982)
1979–1984	One Day at a Time	Max Horvath	49 episodes
1981	Aloha Paradise	Josh	Episode "Best of Friends/Success/Nine Karats"
1982	Darkroom	Barry	Episode "Who's There?"
1982	Insight	J. Walter	Episode "For Love or Money"
1983–1984	Fantasy Island	Joe Manning/Dr. Russ Nicholas	2 episodes
1985	The Greatest Adventure: Stories from the Bible		Episode "Joseph and His Brothers"
1985	Crazy Like a Fox	Andy Farr	Episode "Is There a Fox in the House?"
1985–1986	Foley Square	Peter Newman	14 episodes
1987	Murder, She Wrote	Arnie Wakeman	Episode "When Thieves Fall Out"
1987	Pound Puppies	Various Characters (voice role)	4 episodes
1987–1988	The Smurfs	Additional Voices	2 episodes
1988–1989	Fantastic Max	Additional Voices	3 episodes
1989	The Famous Teddy Z	Landon Tarmac	Episode "Bobby the Chimp"
1992	Fish Police		Episode "The Two Gils"
1993	L.A. Law	Mitchell Schein	Episode "Come Rain or Schein"
1994–1999	Mad About You	Mr. Shapiro	Episode "Two Tickets to Paradise"
1995	Double Rush	Angus Black"	Episode "Snowings and Goings"
2012–2017	Baby Daddy	Director	Episode "Over My Dead Bonnie"
