= Elizabeth Mitchell =

American actress (born 1970)

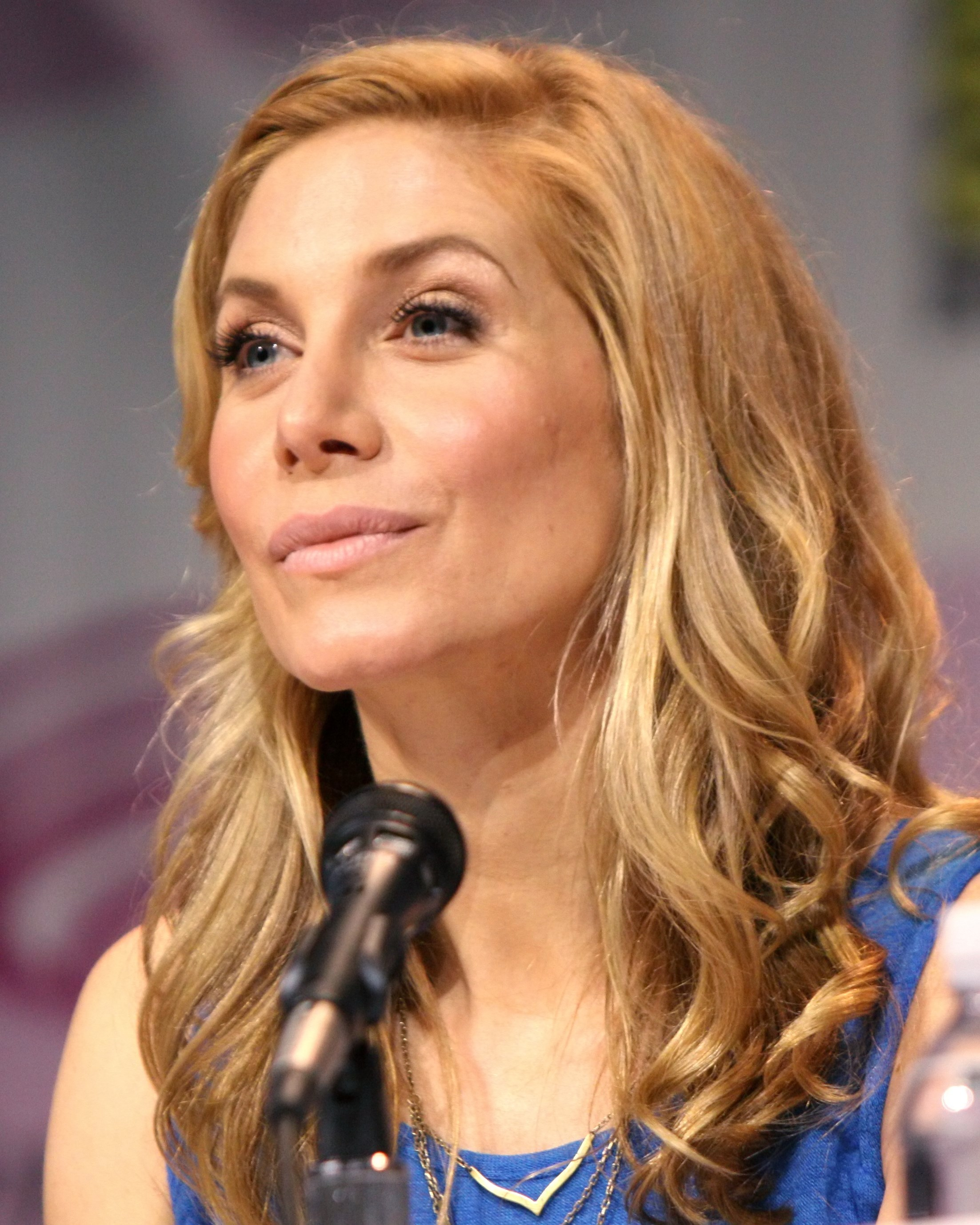
- Mitchell in 2013
- Born: Elizabeth Joanna Robertson; March 27, 1970 (age 56); Los Angeles, California, U.S.
- Education: Stephens College (BFA)
- Occupation: Actress
- Years active: 1992–present
- Spouse: Chris Soldevilla (m. 2004; div. 2013)
- Children: 1

Elizabeth Mitchell (born Elizabeth Joanna Robertson; March 27, 1970) is an American actress. She received a Primetime Emmy Award nomination for her lead role as Juliet Burke on the ABC mystery drama series Lost (2006–2010). She also had lead roles on the television series V (2009–2010), Revolution (2012–2014), Dead of Summer (2016), and The Santa Clauses (2022–2023), for which she received a Children's and Family Emmy Award nomination. She had recurring roles on the television series ER (2000–2001), Once Upon a Time (2014), The Expanse (2018, 2021), and Outer Banks (2021–2026).

Mitchell has appeared in numerous films, including Gia (1998), Frequency (2000), Nurse Betty (2000), The Santa Clause 2 (2002), The Santa Clause 3: The Escape Clause (2006), Running Scared (2006), Answers to Nothing (2011), The Purge: Election Year (2016), and Queen Bees (2021).

== Early life ==
Mitchell was born in Los Angeles, California. Mitchell and her mother moved to Dallas in 1970, where her mother married Joseph Mitchell in 1975. Her stepfather, Joseph Day Mitchell, and mother, Josephine Marian Mitchell (née Jenkins), are lawyers based in Dallas. Mitchell graduated from Booker T. Washington High School for the Performing and Visual Arts, a public magnet school. She is the eldest of three sisters, the others being Kristina Helen "Kristie" Mitchell and Katherine Day "Kate" Mitchell.

She attended Stephens College, graduating with a bachelor of fine arts in acting, and then studied at the British American Drama Academy.

== Career ==
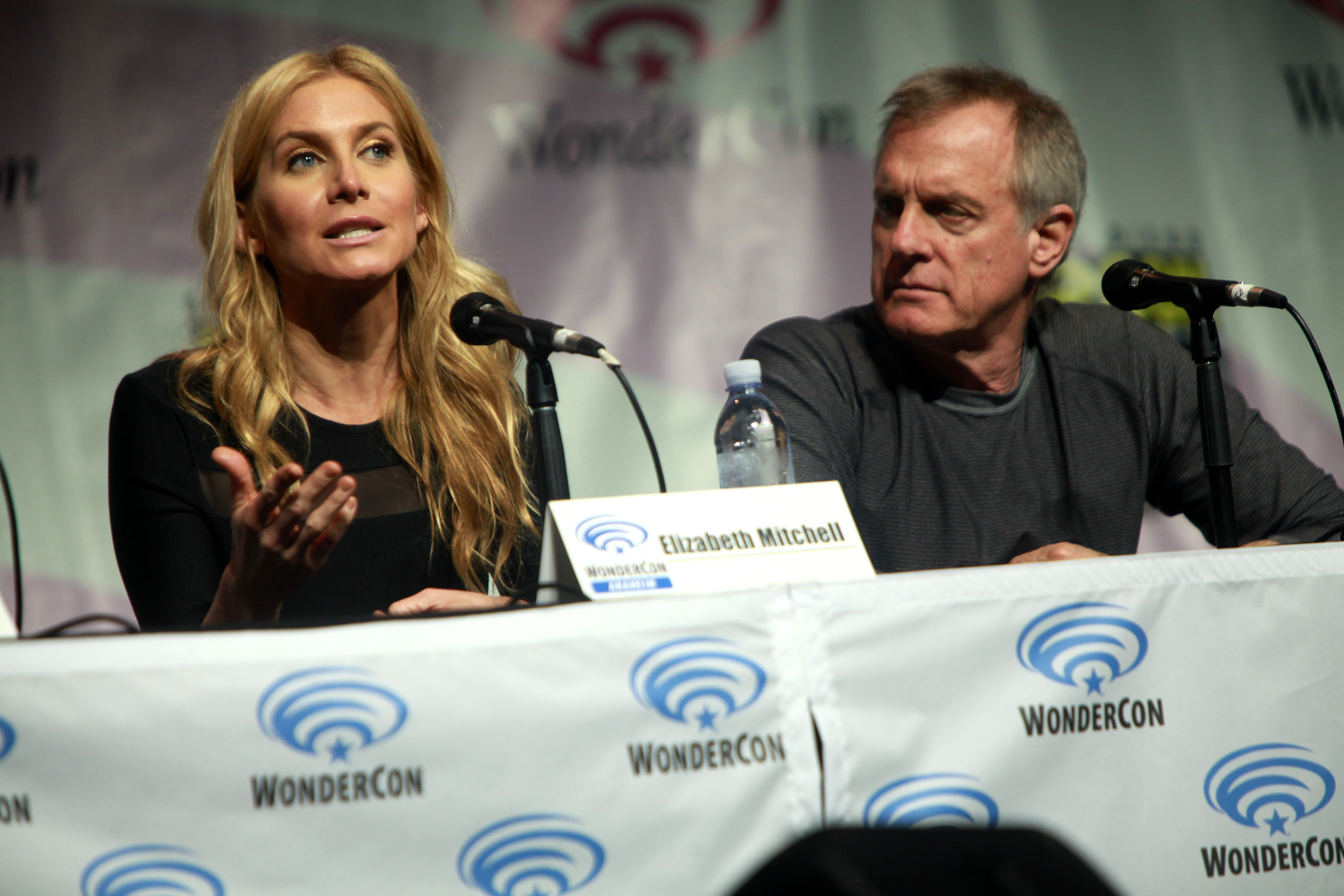
Mitchell at a Revolution panel, at WonderCon in 2014, with actor Stephen Collins

Mitchell's theatre work includes six years at Dallas Theater Center and a season at Encore Theater. She had an early TV role as Dinah Lee on the soap opera Loving from 1994 to 1995. She co-starred in the 1998 film Gia and the 2000 film Frequency.

In the 2002 film The Santa Clause 2, Mitchell played Carol Newman, who becomes Mrs. Claus. She reprised the role for the sequel, The Santa Clause 3: The Escape Clause, which was released in 2006. A limited series based on the film, titled The Santa Clauses, was launched on Disney+ in 2022, with Mitchell reprising her character from the films. For her work on the series, Mitchell received a Children's and Family Emmy Award for Outstanding Supporting Performer nomination at the 3rd Children's and Family Emmy Awards held in 2025.

On TV, she played psychiatrist Kim Legaspi, the first woman partner of Kerry Weaver during the 2000–2001 season of TV series ER, in a recurring role. She had a one-episode role in House M.D. as a patient.

In 2006, she played Juliet Burke on Lost, beginning in the third-season premiere "A Tale of Two Cities", a role she played for four seasons, three as a main character and one in a recurring capacity. In that same year, she appeared in the crime thriller Running Scared.

In March 2009, Mitchell was cast in the ABC series V, a remake of the science-fiction television miniseries. Although ABC and Warner Bros. officials said she was only cast as a guest star, the announcement led to speculation and concern that Mitchell's character would be killed off at the end of the fifth season of Lost, which ended on a cliff-hanger that left the fate of her character unknown. Mitchell was later named the lead actress on V and her character was indeed written out in the premiere of the sixth season of Lost, but returned for the two-part series finale. V lasted for one more season, which premiered on January 4, 2011.

Mitchell had a guest-starring role on Law & Order: Special Victims Unit in 2011, portraying June Frye. In 2012, she joined the cast of the series Revolution as Rachel Matheson, replacing actress Andrea Roth. The series premiered on September 17, 2012 and ended in May 2014. She then recurred as the Snow Queen on the TV fantasy series Once Upon a Time in late 2014.

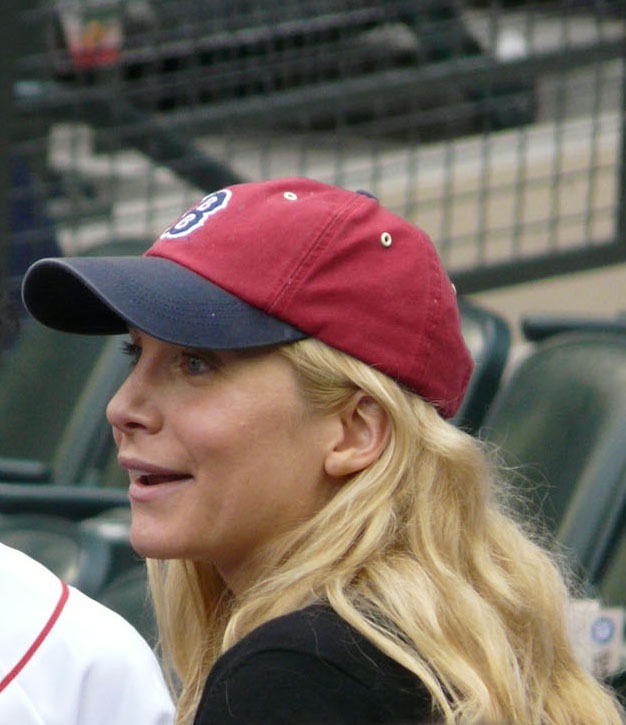
Mitchell in Seattle 2008 supporting the Boston Red Sox

In 2016, Mitchell starred as U.S. senator Charlene "Charlie" Roan in the science-fiction horror film The Purge: Election Year. Also that year, it was announced Mitchell would join the main cast of the Freeform supernatural horror series Dead of Summer, portraying Deb Carpenter. The series ended after one season.

In 2018, Mitchell played Anna Volovodov on season three of The Expanse. She made a cameo in the third episode of the final season of the series in 2021.

Also in 2021, she appeared in the film Queen Bees and the second season of the Netflix series Outer Banks.

In 2022, she joined FBI: International in the recurring role of Angela Cassidy, a government agent and the long-missing mother of main character Scott Forrester.

== Personal life ==
While filming The Linda McCartney Story in 2000, Mitchell and co-star Gary Bakewell began dating and later became engaged, but the relationship ended in 2002.

Mitchell married improvisation actor Chris Soldevilla in 2004. The two lived together on Bainbridge Island, Washington, with their son, who was born in 2005. They divorced in 2013.

== Filmography ==
=== Film ===
Year	Title	Role	Notes
1999	Molly	Beverly Trehare	
2000	Frequency	Jules Sullivan	
2000	Nurse Betty	Chloe Jensen	
2001	Double Bang	Karen Winterman	
2001	Hollywood Palms	Blair	
2002	The Santa Clause 2	Carol Newman / Mrs. Claus	
2006	Running Scared	Edele Hansel	
2006	The Santa Clause 3: The Escape Clause	Mrs. Claus / Carol Newman-Calvin	
2011	Answers to Nothing	Kate	
2016	The Purge: Election Year	Charlie Roan	
2020	What We Found	Captain Hilman	
2021	Queen Bees	Laura Wilson	
2021	Witch Hunt	Martha Goode	Also executive producer
2022	When Time Got Louder	Tish Peterson	
2023	Aliens Abducted My Parents and Now I Feel Kinda Left Out	Vera	
2024	Sound of Hope: The Story of Possum Trot	Susan Ramsey	

=== Television ===
Year	Title	Role	Notes
1993	Dangerous Curves	Bethanny Haines	Episode: "Rainbow Serpent"
1994–1995	Loving	Dinah Lee Mayberry Alden McKenzie #2	Main role
1996	L.A. Firefighters	Laura Malloy	Main role
1996	The Sentinel	Wendy Hawthorne	Episode: "True Crime"
1997	Comfort, Texas	Trudy	Unsold TV pilot
1997	JAG	Sandra Gilbert	Episode: "The Court-Martial of Sandra Gilbert"
1998	Gia	Linda Mitchell	Television film
1998	Significant Others	Jane Chasen	Main role
1999–2000	Time of Your Life	Ashley Holloway	Recurring role
2000	The Linda McCartney Story	Linda McCartney	Television film
2000–2001	ER	Kim Legaspi	Recurring role (season 7)
2001	The Beast	Alice Allenby	Main role
2001	Spin City	Nancy Wheeler	Episode: "Fight Club"
2002	Man and Boy	Cyd Mason	Television film
2003	CSI: Crime Scene Investigation	Melissa Winters	Episode: "One Hit Wonder"
2003	Law & Order: Special Victims Unit	Andrea Brown	Episode: "Mercy"
2003	The Lyon's Den	Ariel Saxon	Main role
2004	Boston Legal	Christine Pauley	Guest role; 2 episodes
2004	Everwood	Sara Beck	Episode: "Staking Claim"
2004	Grammercy Park	Taylor Elliot Quinn	Unsold TV pilot
2004	House	Mary Augustine	Episode: "Damned If You Do"
2004	3: The Dale Earnhardt Story	Teresa Earnhardt	Television film
2006	Haskett's Chance	Ann Haskett	Unsold TV pilot
2006–2010	Lost	Juliet Burke	Main role
2007–2008	Lost: Missing Pieces	Juliet Burke	Web miniseries; 4 webisode
2009–2011	V	Erica Evans	Main role
2011	Law & Order: Special Victims Unit	June Frye	Episode: "Totem"
2012–2014	Revolution	Rachel Matheson	Main role
2013	Kristin's Christmas Past	Barbara Cartwell	Television film
2013	Prosecuting Casey Anthony	Linda Drane Burdick	Television film
2014	Once Upon a Time	Ingrid / Snow Queen / Sarah Fisher	Recurring role (season 4)
2015	Crossing Lines	Carine Strand	Main role
2015	Gortimer Gibbon's Life on Normal Street	Future Mel Fuller	Episode: "Mel vs. the Future"
2016	Dead of Summer	Deb Carpenter	Main role
2018, 2021	The Expanse	Anna Volovodov	Recurring role (season 3); guest role (season 6)
2019	Blindspot	Scarlett Myers	Episode: "Everybody Hates Kathy"
2019	The Christmas Club	Olivia Bennett	Television film
2021	The Good Doctor	Dannie Miller	Episode: "We're All Crazy Sometimes"
2021–2023	Outer Banks	Carla Limbrey	Recurring role (season 2–3)
2022	FBI: International	Angela Cassidy	Guest role; 3 episodes
2022	First Kill	Margot Fairmont	Main role
2022–2023	The Santa Clauses	Carol Calvin / Mrs. Claus	Main role

=== Stage ===
Year	Title	Role	Notes
1992	Amateurs	Jennifer	
1994	Red Channels	Shelia Harcourt	
1995	Three Tall Women	C	
1999	Absolution	Gordon's wife	
2008	A Midsummer Night's Dream	Helena	

== Awards and nominations ==
Mitchell has won the Saturn Award for Best Supporting Actress on Television in 2008, among other nominations. For her appearance as Juliet Burke on the series finale of Lost, Mitchell was nominated for the Primetime Emmy Award for Outstanding Guest Actress in a Drama Series in 2010.

Year	Association	Category	Nominated work	Result
2006	Saturn Awards	Best Supporting Actress on Television	Lost	Nominated
2007	Monte-Carlo Television Festival	Outstanding Actress in a Drama Series	Lost	Nominated
2007	Saturn Awards	Best Supporting Actress on Television	Lost	Nominated
2008	Monte-Carlo Television Festival	Outstanding Actress in a Drama Series	Lost	Nominated
2008	Saturn Awards	Best Supporting Actress on Television	Lost	Won (Note: Tied with Summer Glau.)
2009	Monte-Carlo Television Festival	Outstanding Actress in a Drama Series	Lost	Nominated
2009	Saturn Awards	Best Supporting Actress on Television	Lost	Nominated
2010	Primetime Emmy Award	Outstanding Guest Actress in a Drama Series	Lost	Nominated
2011	Saturn Awards	Best Actress on Television	V	Nominated
2014	Saturn Awards	Best Supporting Actress on Television	Revolution	Nominated
2025	Children's and Family Emmy Awards	Outstanding Supporting Performer in a Preschool, Children's or Young Teen Program	The Santa Clauses	Nominated
