= Jay Thomas =

American actor (1948–2017)

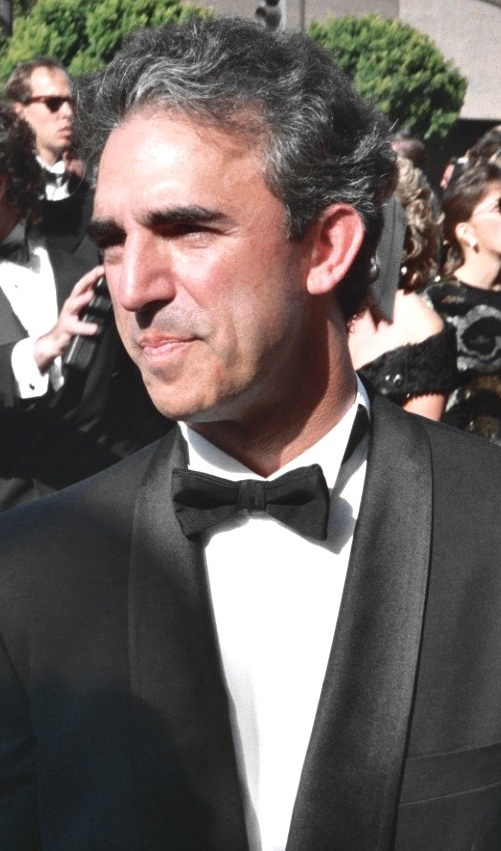
- Thomas at the 1992 Emmy Awards
- Born: Jon Thomas Terrell; July 12, 1948; Kermit, Texas, U.S.
- Died: August 24, 2017 (aged 69); Santa Barbara, California, U.S.
- Occupations: Actor; comedian; radio talk show host
- Years active: 1972–2017
- Spouse: Sally Michelson (m. 1987)
- Children: 3, including J. T. Harding

Jon "Jay" Thomas Terrell (July 12, 1948 – August 24, 2017) was an American actor, comedian, and radio personality. He was heard in New York from 1976 to 1979 on top-40 station 99X, and later on rhythmic CHR station 92KTU, and in Los Angeles beginning in 1986 on KPWR "Power 106", where he hosted the station's top-rated morning show until 1993. His notable television work included his co-starring role as Remo DaVinci on Mork & Mindy (1979–1981), the recurring role of Eddie LeBec, a Boston Bruins goalie on the downside of his career, on Cheers (1987–1989), the lead character of newspaper columnist Jack Stein on Love & War (1992–1995), and a repeat guest role as Jerry Gold, a talk-show host who becomes both an antagonist and love interest of the title character on Murphy Brown. He won the Primetime Emmy Award for Outstanding Guest Actor in a Comedy Series in 1990 and 1991 for portraying Gold. He was given a star on the Hollywood Walk of Fame for radio in 1989.

In 1997, he starred in the television film Killing Mr. Griffin, based on the eponymous novel. In films, he co-starred in Mr. Holland's Opus (1995) as a high-school coach with a flair for theatrics, and portrayed the Easter Bunny in The Santa Clause 2 (2002) and The Santa Clause 3: The Escape Clause (2006).

He was also an annual guest on the Late Show with David Letterman during the Christmas season, where he told a story about how he met Clayton Moore, who portrayed the title character on The Lone Ranger. Beginning in 2005, he hosted The Jay Thomas Show on SiriusXM Satellite Radio channel 94 comedy greats Monday through Thursday afternoons and Friday mornings on Howard 101.

== Early life and education ==
Thomas was born in Kermit, Texas, to Katharine (née Guzzino) and Timothy Harry Terrell. He was raised in his Italian-American mother's Catholic religion; his father was Protestant. Thomas was raised in New Orleans, where he attended and graduated from Jesuit High School. He went on to attend and graduate from Jacksonville University. Thomas was the quarterback on his high-school football team and also quarterbacked in college, a skill he later used on The Late Show with David Letterman.

== Appearances on Late Show with David Letterman ==
Thomas made annual Christmas appearances on David Letterman's CBS late night show, beginning in December 1998. Letterman and one of his other guests that evening, then-New York Jets quarterback Vinny Testaverde, took turns throwing footballs trying to knock a large meatball off the top of a Christmas tree at the other end of the stage. As the two took turns futilely attempting to knock off the meatball, Thomas came back out to join in the festivities, and promptly knocked the meatball from the tree.

On a later visit to the show, Thomas related a story from his early radio days. He was working at WAYS (AM), a Top 40 station in Charlotte, North Carolina in 1972 and did a significant amount of promotional work. Thomas was scheduled to make an appearance at a local Dodge dealership alongside actor Clayton Moore, who would be appearing in character as The Lone Ranger as he would do regularly for Dodge's then-parent, Chrysler Corporation. Thomas and his colleague, Mike Martin, repeatedly stepped away from the festivities to smoke marijuana ("get herbed up"). After they had wrapped up their broadcast and appearances for the afternoon, both men noticed that Moore was still at the dealership with them as his ride back to his hotel never arrived.

According to Thomas, who described himself and Martin as being dressed like hippies with tie dyed shirts and long hair (Thomas claimed his was styled in a "white man's Afro"), the two offered Moore a ride back to the hotel in Thomas's dilapidated, early 1960s vintage Volvo, which Moore accepted. While stuck in traffic, with Moore sitting quietly in the back seat, an impatient, middle-aged man backed his full-sized Buick into the front end of Thomas's Volvo, broke one of its headlights and switched lanes to exit the freeway.

Thomas and Martin then also exited the freeway and began chasing the driver of the Buick and eventually caught up to the man outside a restaurant, blocked his Buick with the Volvo, and confronted him about the broken headlight. The indignant driver denied all; when Thomas threatened to call police, the man exclaimed, "Who do you think they'll believe? Me, or you two hippie freaks?" Moore then emerged from the car in full Lone Ranger regalia and said, in character: "They'll believe me, citizen!" The stunned driver apologized and drove off.

For every year thereafter except 2013, Thomas appeared to repeat the Lone Ranger story, which Letterman called, "The best talk show story, ever", and once again attempt what Letterman would refer to as the "Late Show Quarterback Challenge". For his final appearance in December 2014, Thomas was again successful in knocking the meatball off the top of the tree. Thomas missed the 2013 Late Show Christmas episode due to throat surgery; John McEnroe took his place and told the Lone Ranger story, then tried, unsuccessfully, to knock the meatball off the tree by hitting tennis balls at it.

== Personal life ==
Thomas fathered J. T. Harding in an out-of-wedlock relationship, and the child was adopted by another family in Michigan. Thomas and his son spoke about their reunion on the Dr. Phil Show. Harding was the lead singer of the band JTX and is a country-music songwriter.

Thomas married Sally Michelson in 1987. They had two sons, Samuel and Jacob.

== Death ==
Jay Thomas died of throat cancer on August 24, 2017, surrounded by his family in Santa Barbara, California, at the age of 69.

== Filmography ==
Year	Title	Role	Notes
1979–1981	Mork & Mindy	Remo DaVinci	20 episodes
1981	The Love Boat	Paul Harris	Episode: "First Voyage, Last Voyage"
1984	Master of the Game	Levy	Television miniseries
1984	C.H.U.D.	Cop in diner	
1985	Spenser: For Hire	Tony Broz	Episode: "Discord in a Minor"
1985	The Gig	Rick Valentine	
1986	Legal Eagles	Waiter	
1986	The Park Is Mine	TV Reporter	
1987	Family Ties	Jerry DiNello	Episode: "Super Mom"
1987	A Year in the Life	Scott Spenser	Episode: "What Do People Do All Day?"
1987–1989	Cheers	Eddie LeBec	9 episodes
1988	Monkey Business	Tedesco	
1988	The Adventures of Ragtime	Lester Waylin	
1988	Walt Disney's Wonderful World of Color	Delivery Man	Episode: "Justin Case"
1989	Almost Grown	Unknown	Episode: "Take It Slow"
1989	The Golden Girls	Sy Ferber	Episode: "High Anxiety"
1989	Freddy's Nightmares	Stan Brooks	Episode: "Dream Come True"
1989–1998	Murphy Brown	Jerry Gold	9 episodes Primetime Emmy Award for Outstanding Guest Actor in a Comedy Series (1990–91); Nominated – Primetime Emmy Award for Outstanding Supporting Actor in a Comedy Series(1989)
1990	Miracle Landing	Ed Meyer	Television movie
1990	Open House	Evan Gimbel	2 episodes
1990	Where's Rodney?	Lou Barnes	Television movie
1990	Little Vegas	Bobby	
1990–1991	Married People	Russell Meyers	18 episodes
1992	Straight Talk	Zim Zimmerman	
1992	Batman: The Animated Series	Guard 1	Episode: "The Forgotten"
1992–1995	Love & War	Jack Stein	67 episodes
1995	Cybill	Jay	Episode: "Zing!"
1995	Bless This House	Ted	Episode: "If It Ain't Broken, Break It"
1995	Mr. Holland's Opus	Coach Bill Meister	
1996	A Strange Affair	Eric McKeever	
1996	Dirty Laundry	Joey Greene	
1996–1997	Ink	Jack Stein	3 episodes
1997	Killing Mr. Griffin	John Griffin	Television movie
1997	A Smile Like Yours	Steve Harris	
1997	Aaahh!!! Real Monsters	Disembodied Voice	Episode: "Spy vs. Monster"
1997	Working	Mr. Peyser	Episode: "Lost Weekend"
1998	My Date with the President's Daughter	Charles Fletcher	Television movie
1998	The Simple Life	Joel Campbell	Episode: "Sara's Ex"
1998	The Adventures of Ragtime	Lester Waylin	
1998	Monkey Business	Tedesco	
1998	Last Chance	Artie	
1998–1999	Hercules	Ares	Voice, 6 episodes
1999	Stranger in My House	Ray Young	
1999	Katie Joplin	Glen Shotz	
1999	Fantasy Island	Carl Harbin	Episode: "The Real Thing"
1999	Dead Man's Gun	Emil Kosar	Episode: "The Good Chef"
1999	The Wild Thornberrys	Bull Seal	Voice; episode: "Tamper Proof Seal"
1999	The Big Tease	Tony Bolero	Uncredited
2000	Who Wants to Marry a Multi-Millionaire?	Himself	Host, TV special
2000	An American Daughter	Timber Tucker	Television movie
2001	Surfacing: AKA A Letter from My Father	Tom	
2001–2002	The Education of Max Bickford	Jerry Zibowski	2 episodes
2002	Ed	Gary Siringo	Episode: "Small Town Guys"
2002	Monday Night Mayhem	Pete Rozelle	Television movie
2002	Dragonfly	Hal	
2002	Law & Order: Special Victims Unit	Joe Sherman	Episode: "Vulnerable"
2002	The Santa Clause 2	Easter Bunny	Cameo
2003	Run of the House	Bob Melman	Episode: "Twas the Night Before Homecoming"
2004	Teacher's Pet	Barry Anger	Voice
2004	Joan of Arcadia	Obnoxious Investor at Spa	Episode: "Recreation"
2006	The Santa Clause 3: The Escape Clause	Easter Bunny	
2007, 2010	American Dad!	Brett Morris	Voice, 2 episodes
2008	Boston Legal	Ian Hoberman	Episode: "Happy Trails"
2009	The Pool Boys	Marty	
2009	Labor Pains	Garth	
2010	Cold Case	Lance Katrola	Episode: "One Fall"
2010	Sex Tax: Based on a True Story	Charles Taylor	
2010	Mysteries at the Museum	Narrator	12 episodes
2011	Snatched	Roger Byamm	
2011	Horrorween	Two Headed Monster	
2011	Retired at 35	Mr. Jenkins	Episode: "Workin' Man"
2011	Hung	Sandee's father	Episode: "The Whole Beefalo"
2012	Shake It Up	Dan Gold	Episode: "Copy Kat It Up"
2013	The Haunting of…	Himself	Episode: "Jay Thomas"
2013	Life Tracker	Attorney General	
2013	Underdogs	Mike Mayhew	
2013	The Trials of Cate McCall	Loncraine	
2013–2017	Ray Donovan	Marty Grossman	5 episodes (his final role)
2015	NCIS: New Orleans	Marc Maslow	Episode: "Confluence"
2015	Bones	Lenny Jay	Episode: "The Promise in the Palace"
