= Leo Benvenuti and Steve Rudnick =

American screenwriters and producers

Leo Benvenuti and Steve Rudnick are a Chicago-based film and television writing and producing team. The two met in 1978 while studying with Josephine Forsberg at The Players Workshop of Second City. In 1990, they developed their own late-night variety show called The Steve and Leo Show.

Benvenuti and Rudnick also created and co-executive produced NBC's TV series "The Second Half" and the short-lived 1998 Fox TV series Damon, starring Damon Wayans.

They have written several films, including The Santa Clause, Space Jam, and Kicking & Screaming.

== Filmography ==
=== Writers ===
- The Carol Burnett Show (1991)
- Tom Arnold: The Naked Truth 2 (1992)
- The Dennis Miller Show (1992)
- The Rosey and Buddy Show (1992)
- Tom Arnold: The Naked Truth 3 (1993)
- The Second Half (1993) (5 episodes)
- The Santa Clause (1994)
- Space Jam (1996)
- Damon (1998) (also creators)
- Kicking & Screaming (2005)
- The Jeff Garlin Program (2006)
- Are We There Yet? (2012)
- Mayfly (2013)

==== Benvenuti only ====
- Kill the Messenger (2000)

==== Rudnick only ====
- My Guide to Becoming a Rockstar (2002)

=== Producers ===
- The Second Half (1993) (co-executive producers)
- Damon (1998) (executive producers)
- The Jeff Garlin Program (2006) executive producers)

=== Directors ===
- Cop Show (2007) (short)

=== Rudnick as an actor ===
- I'm Here. Where R U (2011)
