= Directors Guild of America Award for Outstanding Directorial Achievement in Theatrical Feature Film =

Annual award for film directing

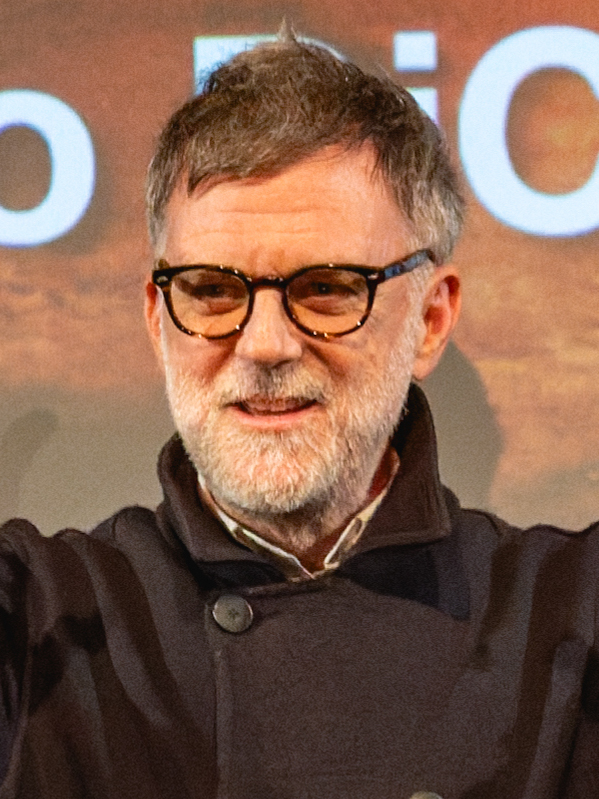
- The 2025 recipient: Paul Thomas Anderson
- Awarded for: Outstanding Directorial Achievement in Theatrical Feature Film
- Country: United States
- Presented by: Directors Guild of America
- First award: 1948
- Currently held by: Paul Thomas Anderson for One Battle After Another (2025)

The Directors Guild of America Award for Outstanding Directorial Achievement in Theatrical Feature Film is one of the annual Directors Guild of America Awards presented by the Directors Guild of America.

With 3 wins out of 13 nominations, Steven Spielberg is both the most awarded and most nominated director of this category in the history of DGA, and the first director to receive DGA nominations in six consecutive decades. Additionally, Alejandro G. Iñárritu is the only director to win twice successively; he was awarded in 2015 and 2016 for his directorial achievements for Birdman or (The Unexpected Virtue of Ignorance) and The Revenant, respectively. Three directing teams have shared the award: Robert Wise and Jerome Robbins for West Side Story (1961), Joel Coen and Ethan Coen for No Country for Old Men (2007), and Daniel Kwan and Daniel Scheinert for Everything Everywhere All at Once (2022).

== Predicting the Oscar's outcome ==
Since its inception the award has predicted the winner of the Academy Award for Best Director on all but eight occasions:

- 1968 – Anthony Harvey (The Lion in Winter); lost to Carol Reed (Oliver!)
- 1972 – Francis Ford Coppola (The Godfather); lost to Bob Fosse (Cabaret)
- 1985 – Steven Spielberg (The Color Purple); despite the film's 11 total Oscar nominations, Spielberg was not nominated for Best Director. Lost to Sydney Pollack (Out of Africa)
- 1995 – Ron Howard (Apollo 13); Howard was not nominated for the Oscar. Lost to Mel Gibson (Braveheart)
- 2000 – Ang Lee (Crouching Tiger, Hidden Dragon); lost to Steven Soderbergh (Traffic)
- 2002 – Rob Marshall (Chicago); lost to Roman Polanski (The Pianist)
- 2012 – Ben Affleck (Argo); Affleck was not nominated for the Oscar, although the film won Best Picture. Lost to Ang Lee (Life of Pi)
- 2019 – Sam Mendes (1917); lost to Bong Joon-ho (Parasite)

== Winners and nominees ==
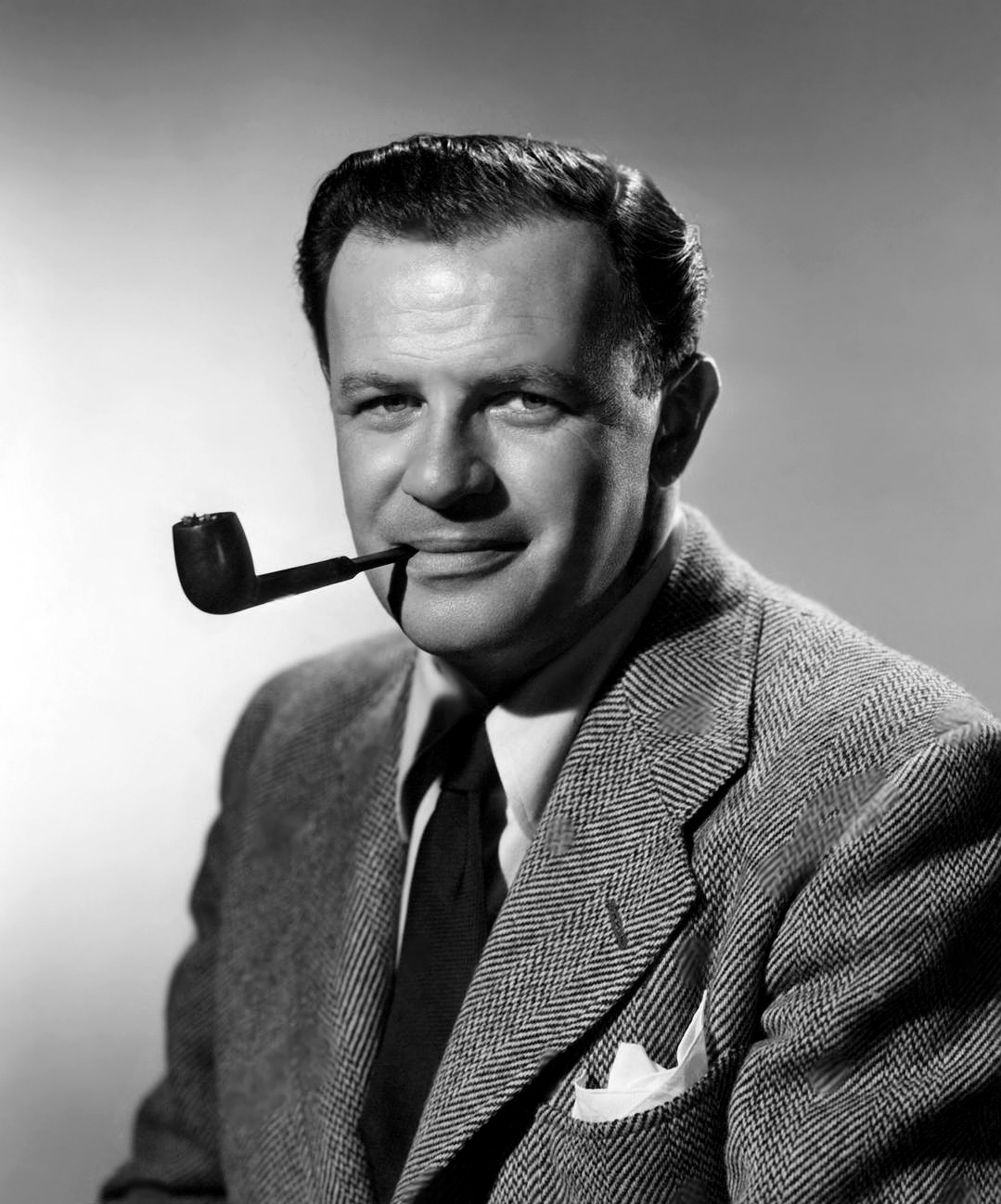
Joseph L. Mankiewicz was the inaugural winner of this award and who won twice for A Letter to Three Wives (1948) and All About Eve (1950).

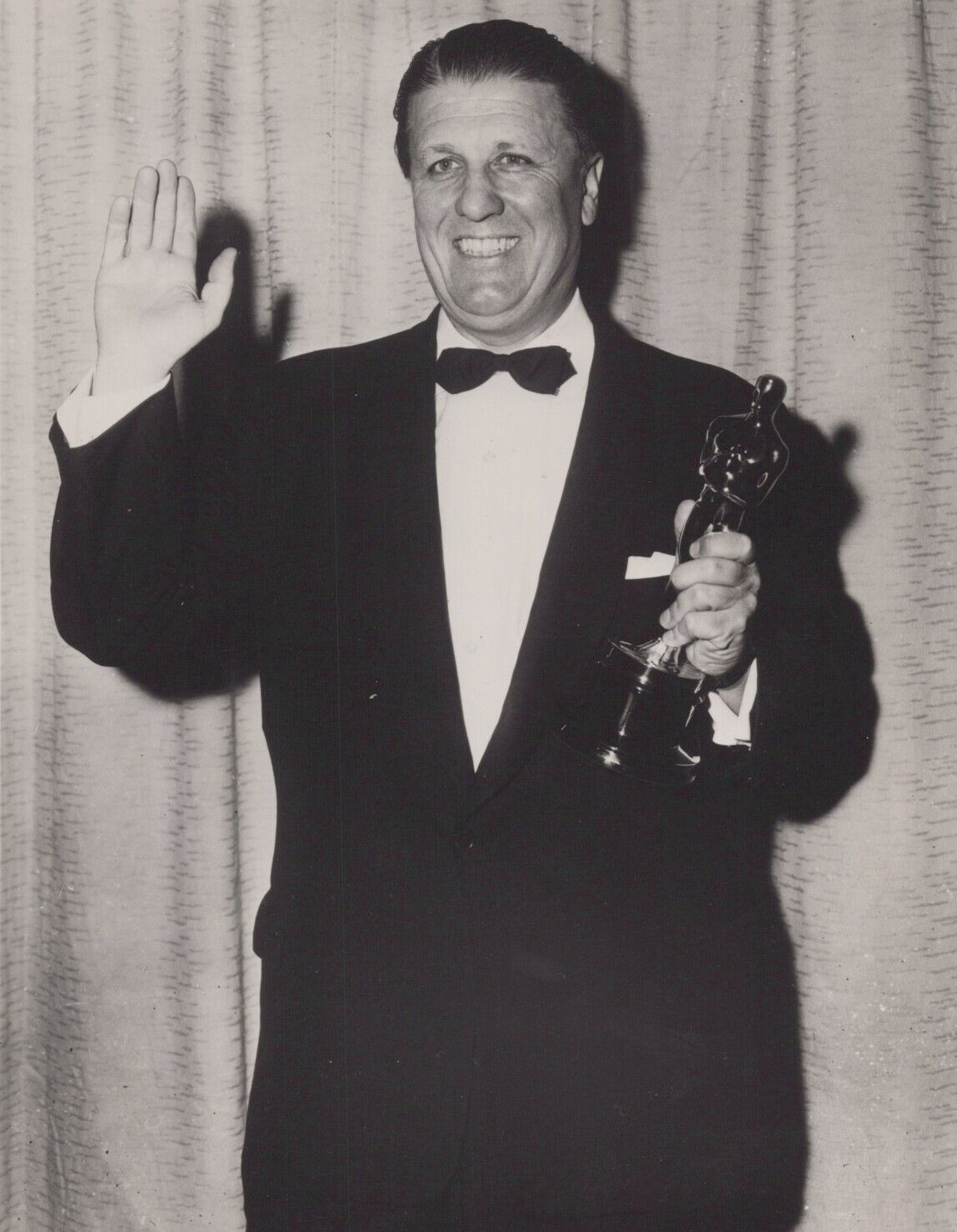
George Stevens was nominated four times for this award winning twice for A Place in the Sun (1951) and Giant (1956).

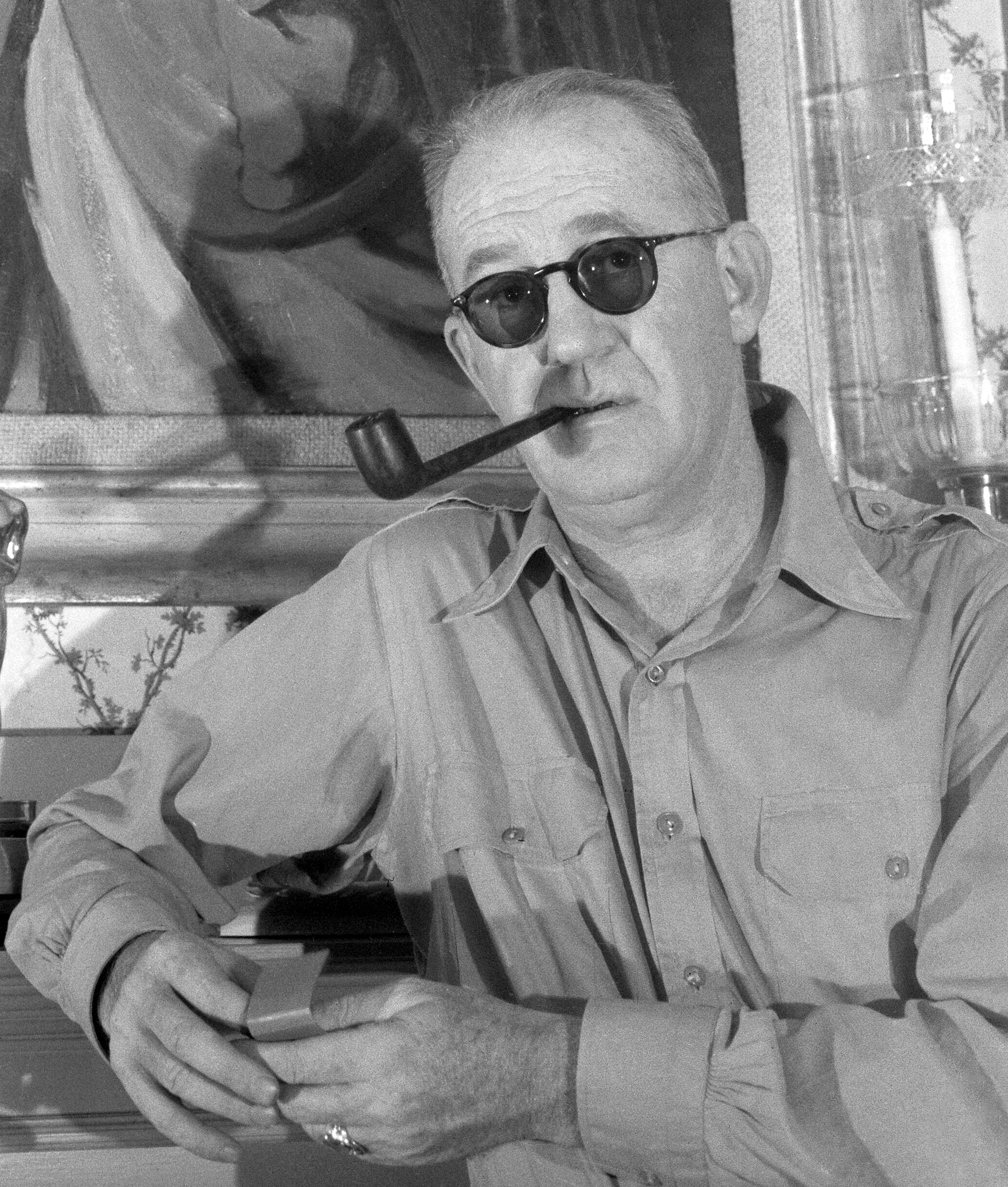
John Ford was nominated thrice winning once for The Quiet Man (1952).

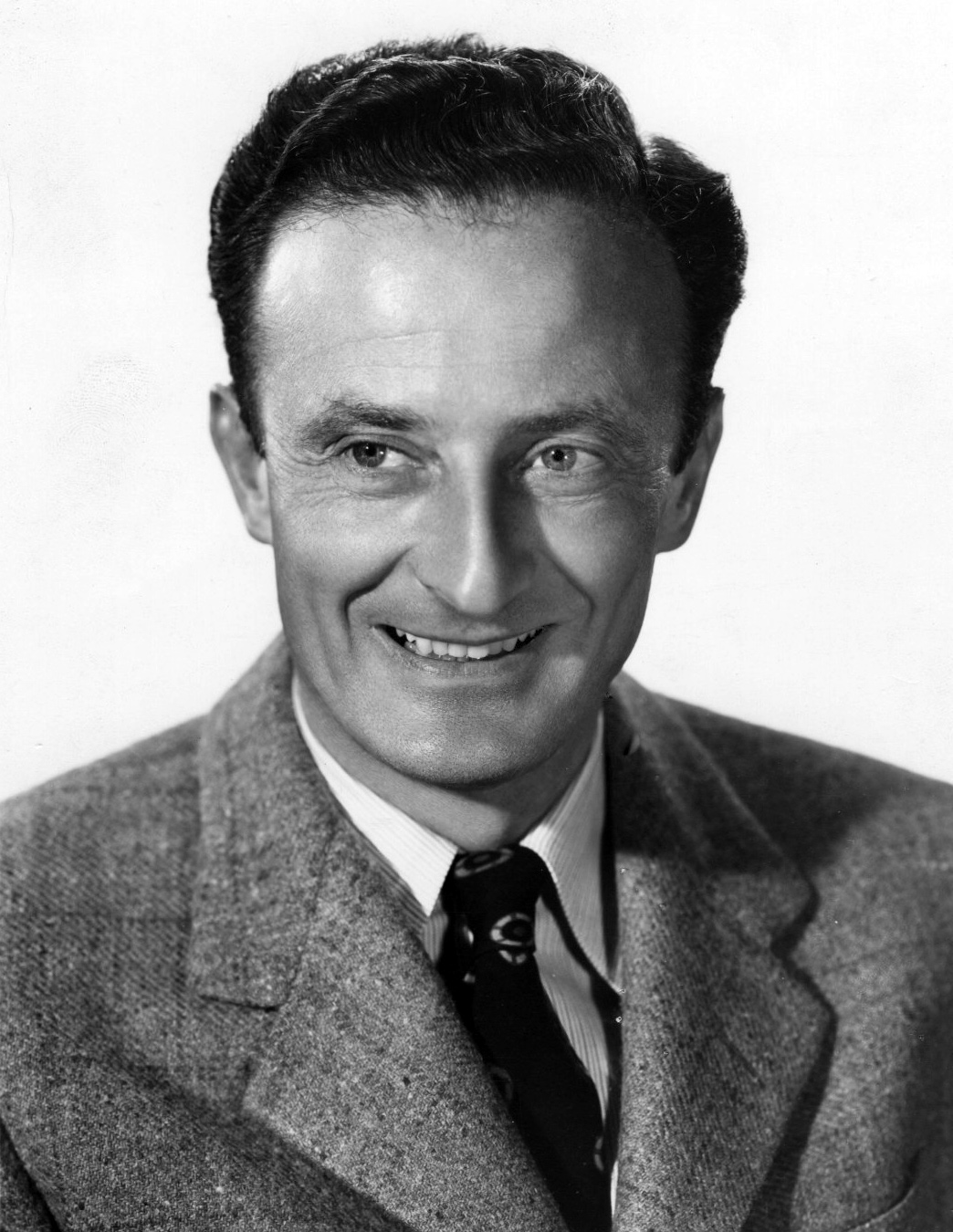
Fred Zinnemann was nominated seven times winning twice for From Here to Eternity (1953) and A Man for All Seasons (1966).

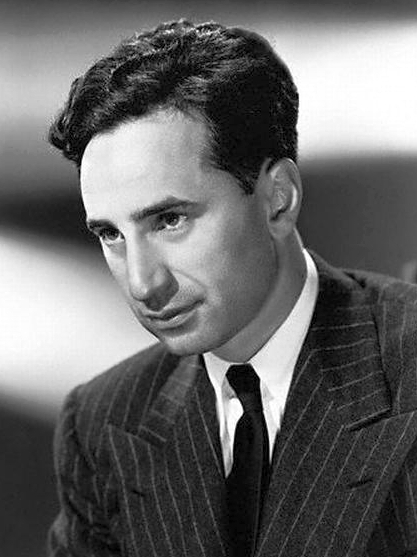
Elia Kazan was nominated seven times winning once for On the Waterfront (1954).

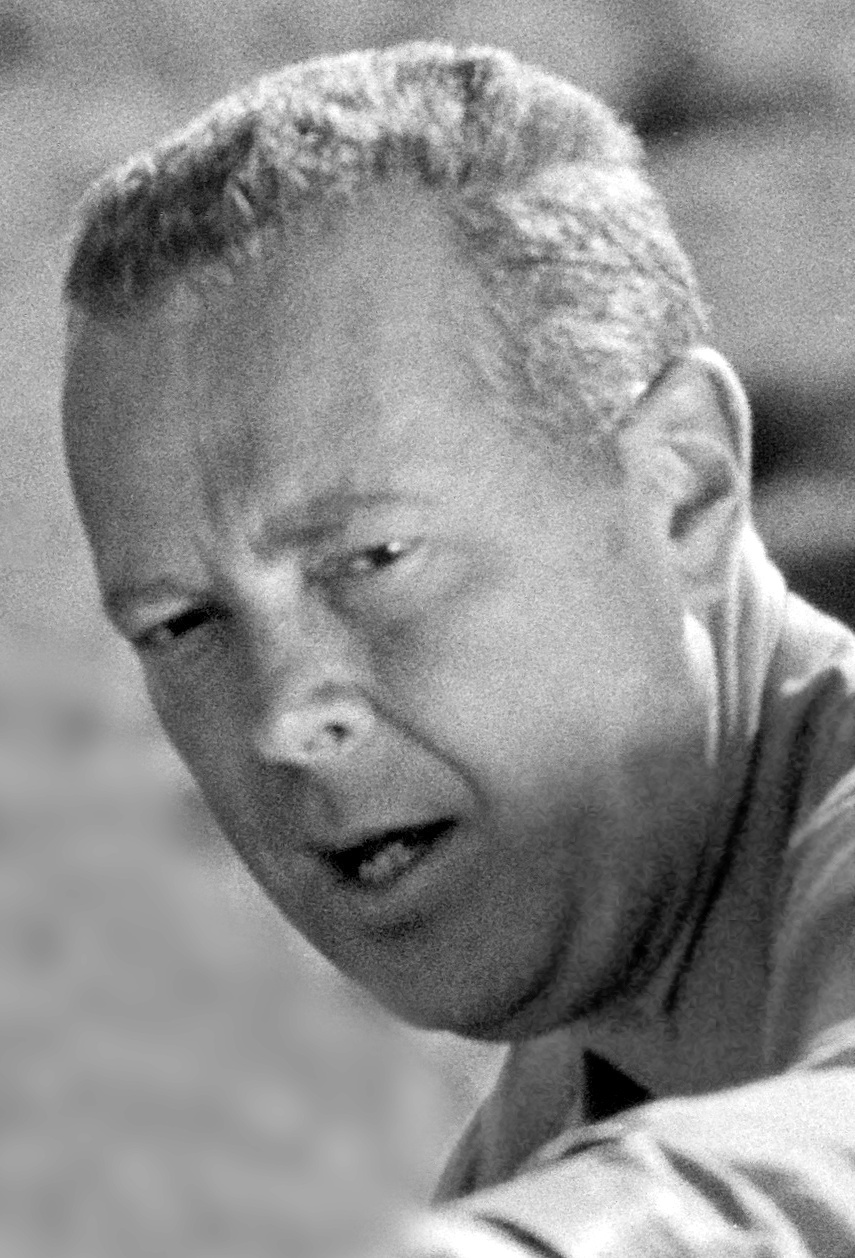
Delbert Mann was nominated twice winning for Marty (1955).

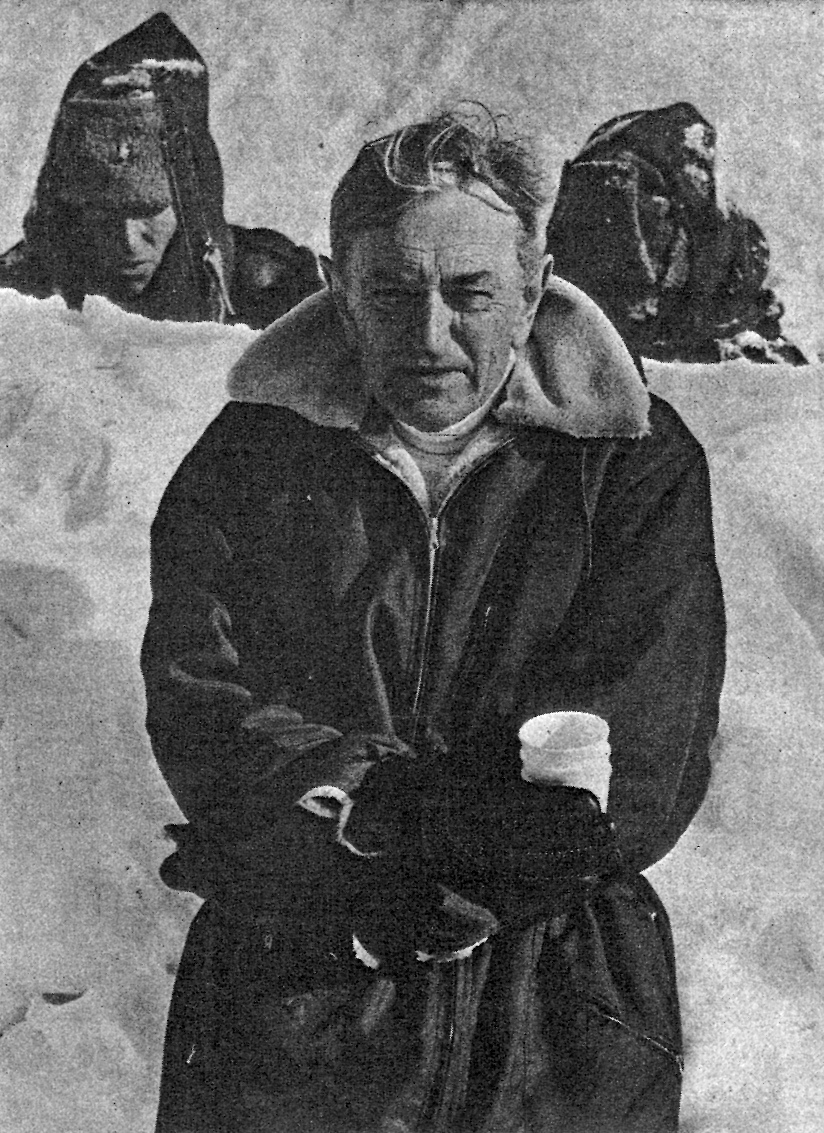
David Lean was nominated four times winning twice for The Bridge on the River Kwai (1957) and Lawrence of Arabia (1962).

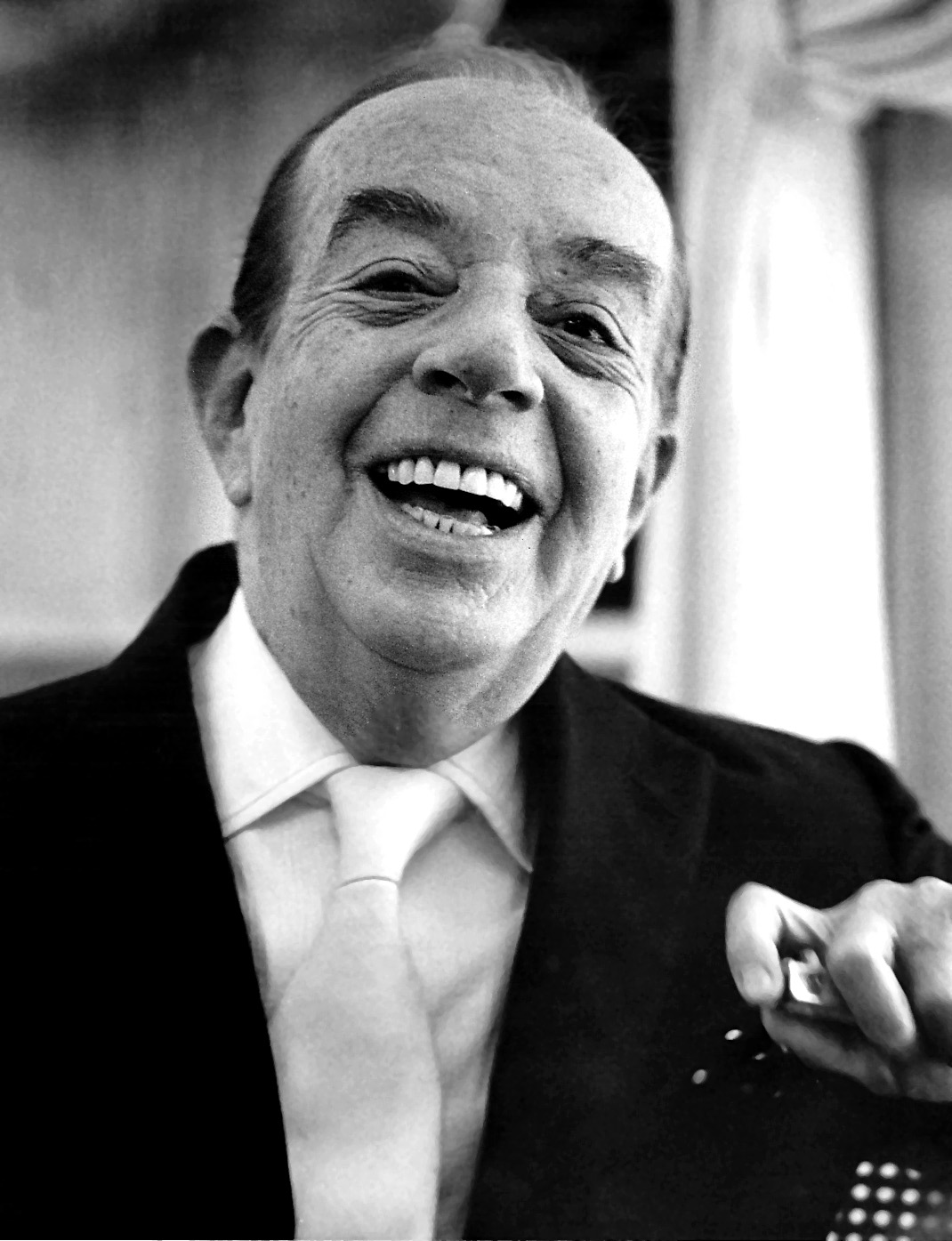
Vincente Minnelli was nominated four times winning once for Gigi (1958).

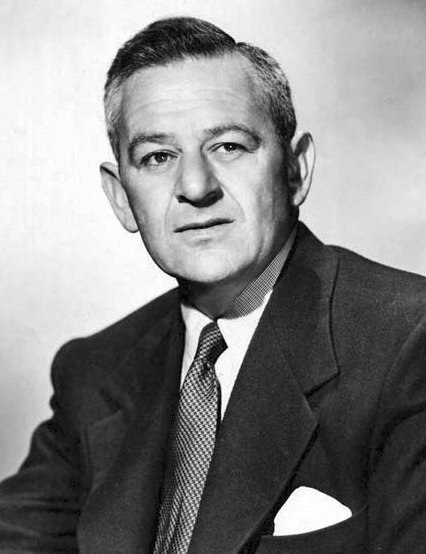
William Wyler was nominated seven times winning once for Ben-Hur (1959).

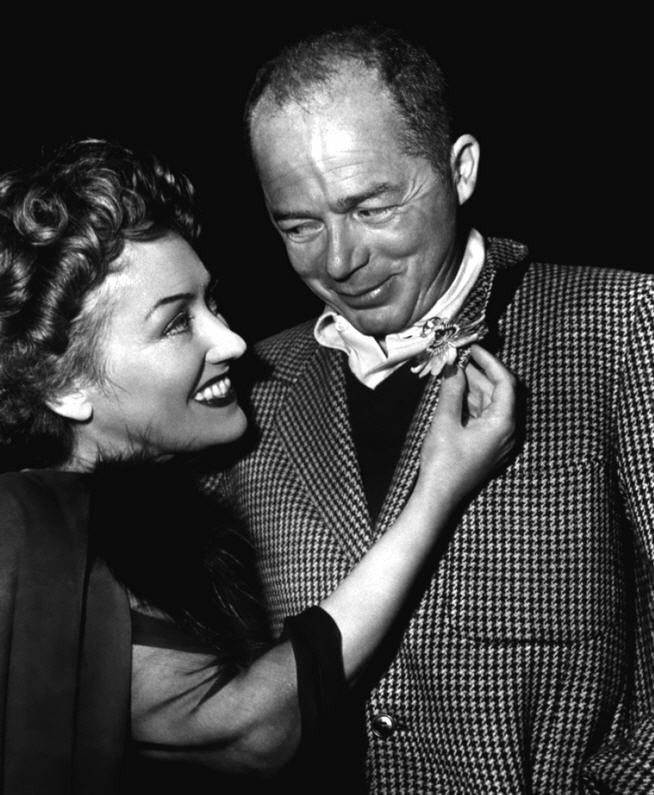
Billy Wilder was nominated six times winning once for The Apartment (1960).

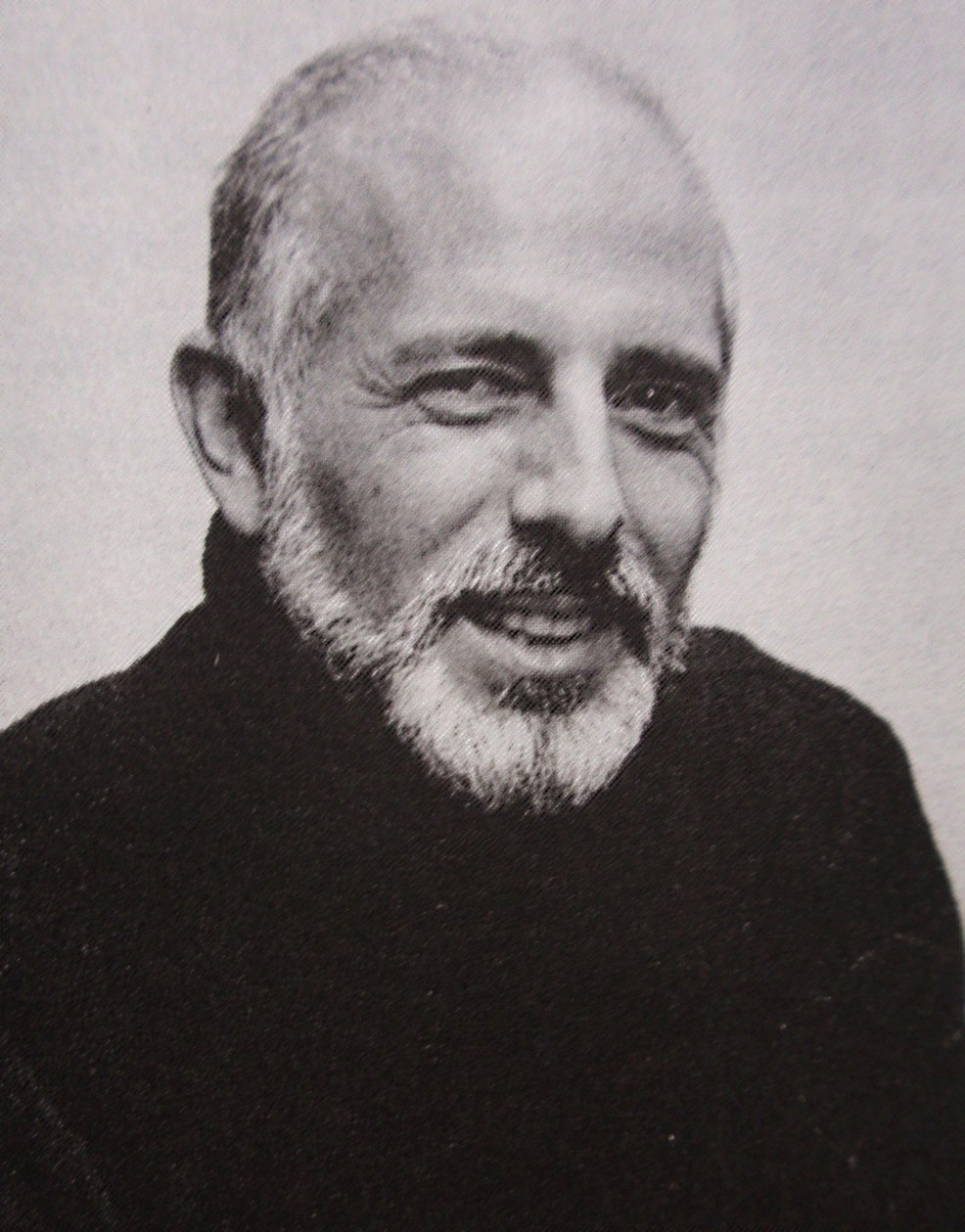
Jerome Robbins won alongside Robert Wise for West Side Story (1961).

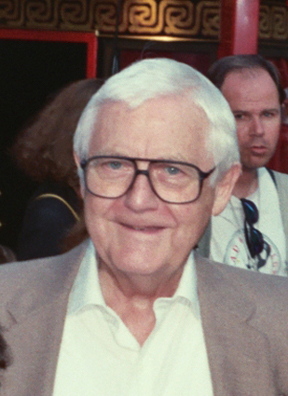
Robert Wise won twice, the first time alongside Jerome Robbins for West Side Story (1961) and the second for The Sound of Music (1965).

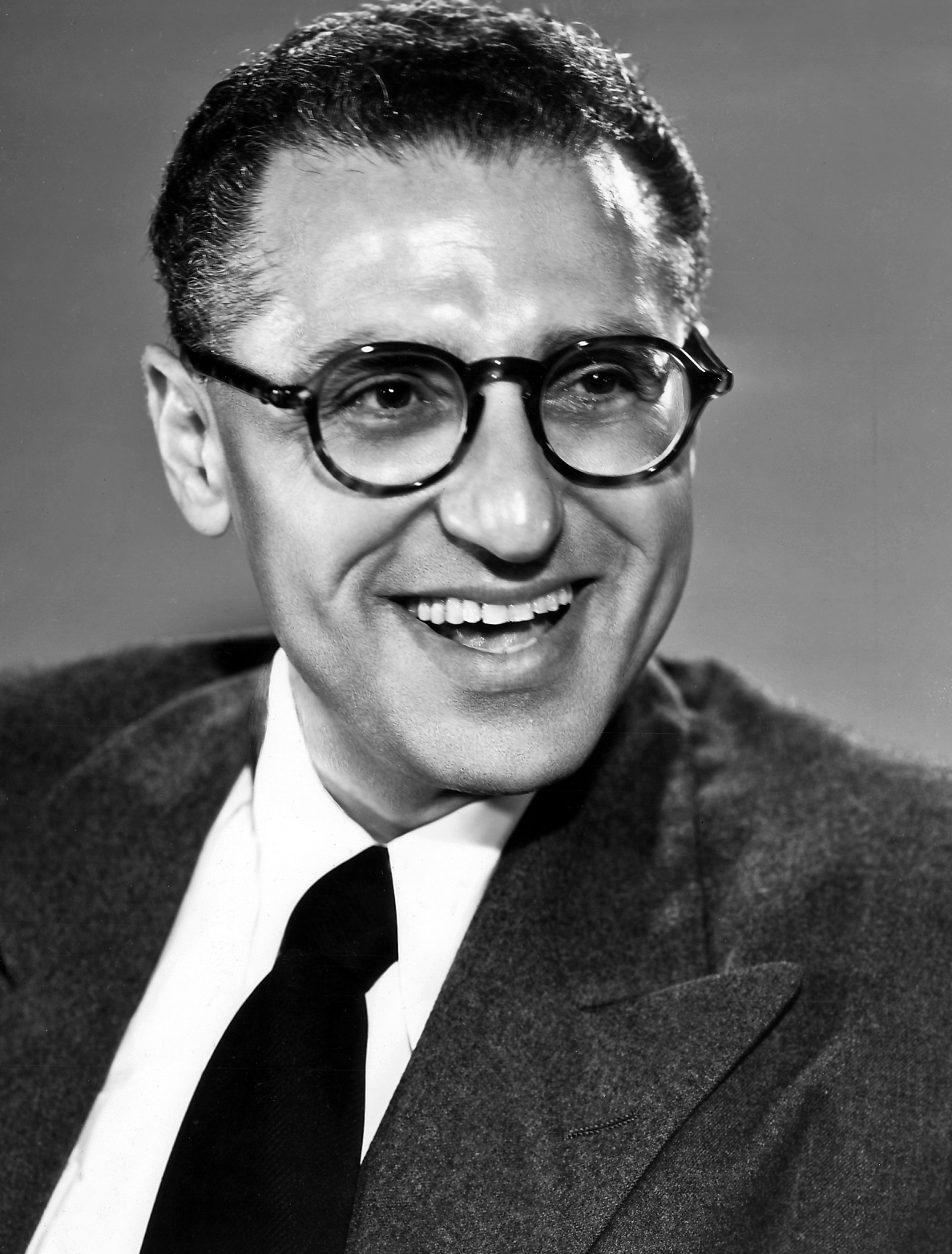
George Cukor was nominated four times winning once for My Fair Lady (1964).

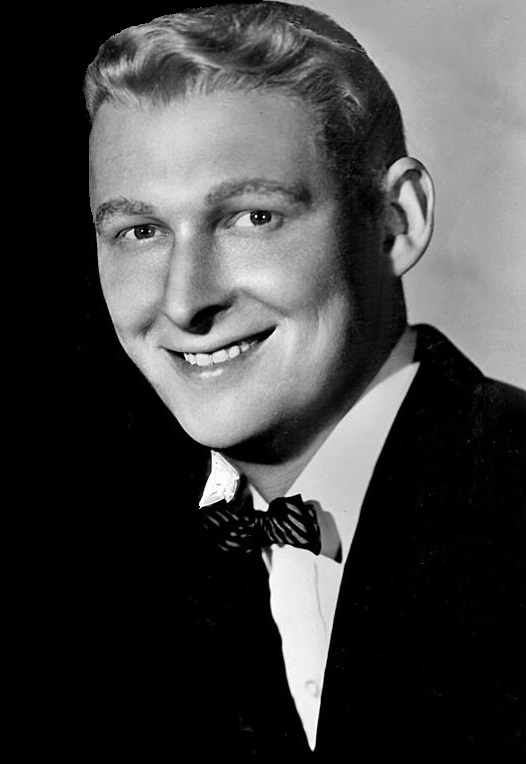
Mike Nichols was nominated thrice winning for The Graduate (1967).

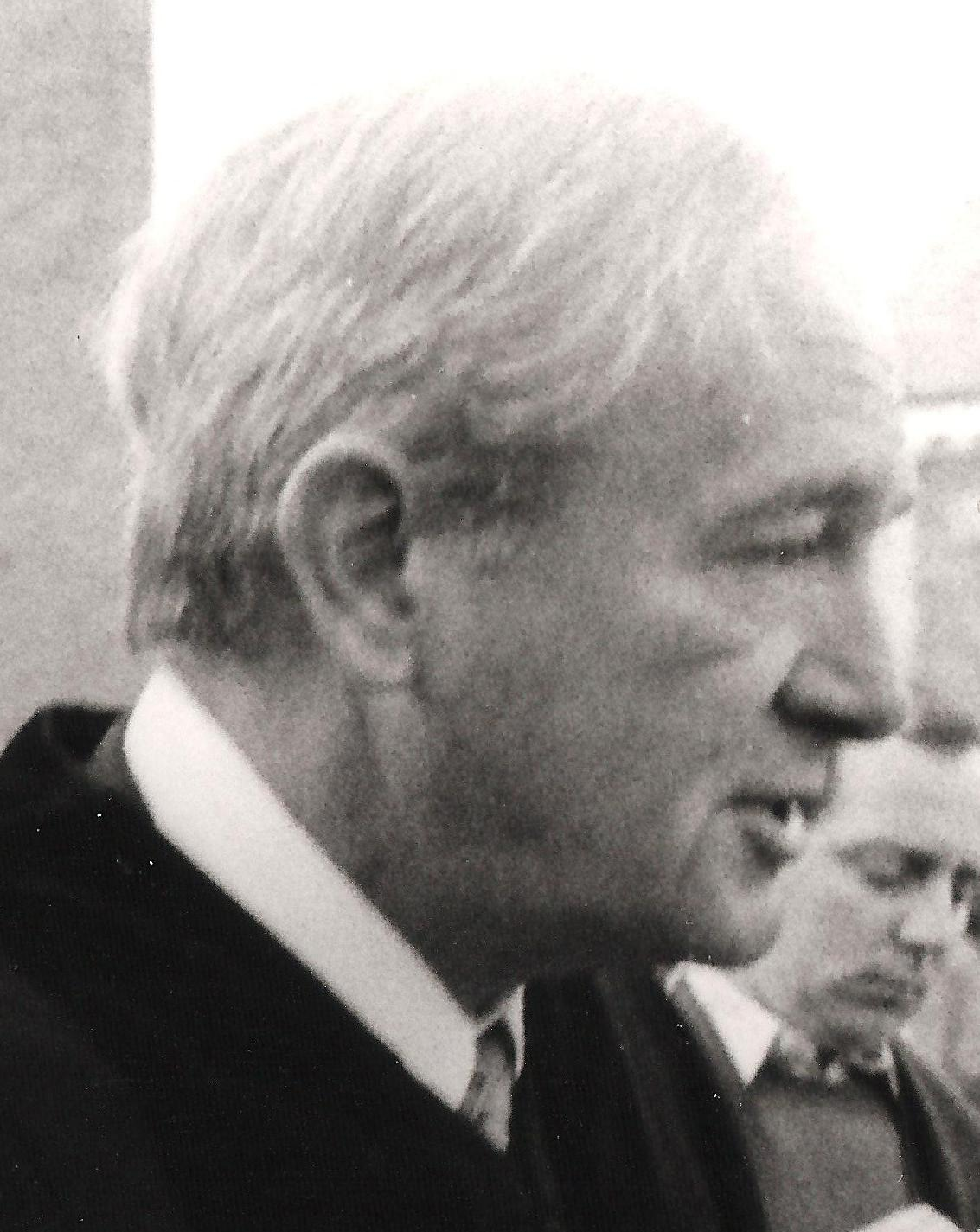
Franklin J. Schaffner won for Patton (1970).

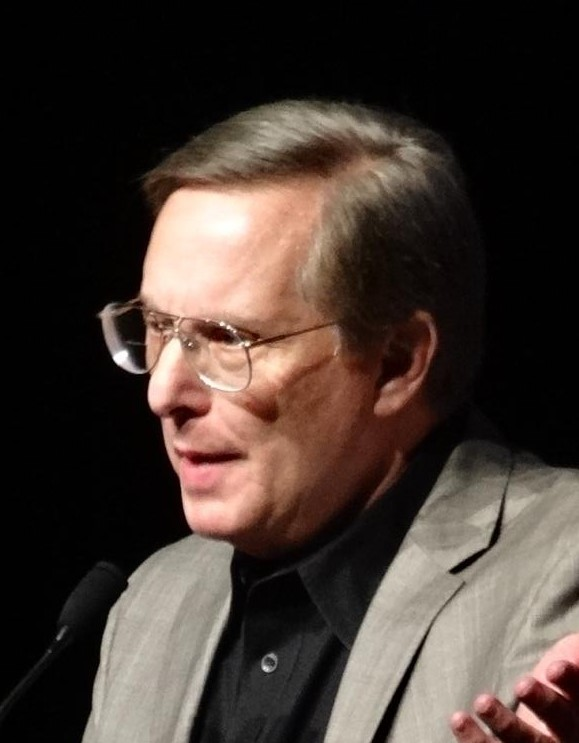
William Friedkin was nominated twice winning for The French Connection (1971).

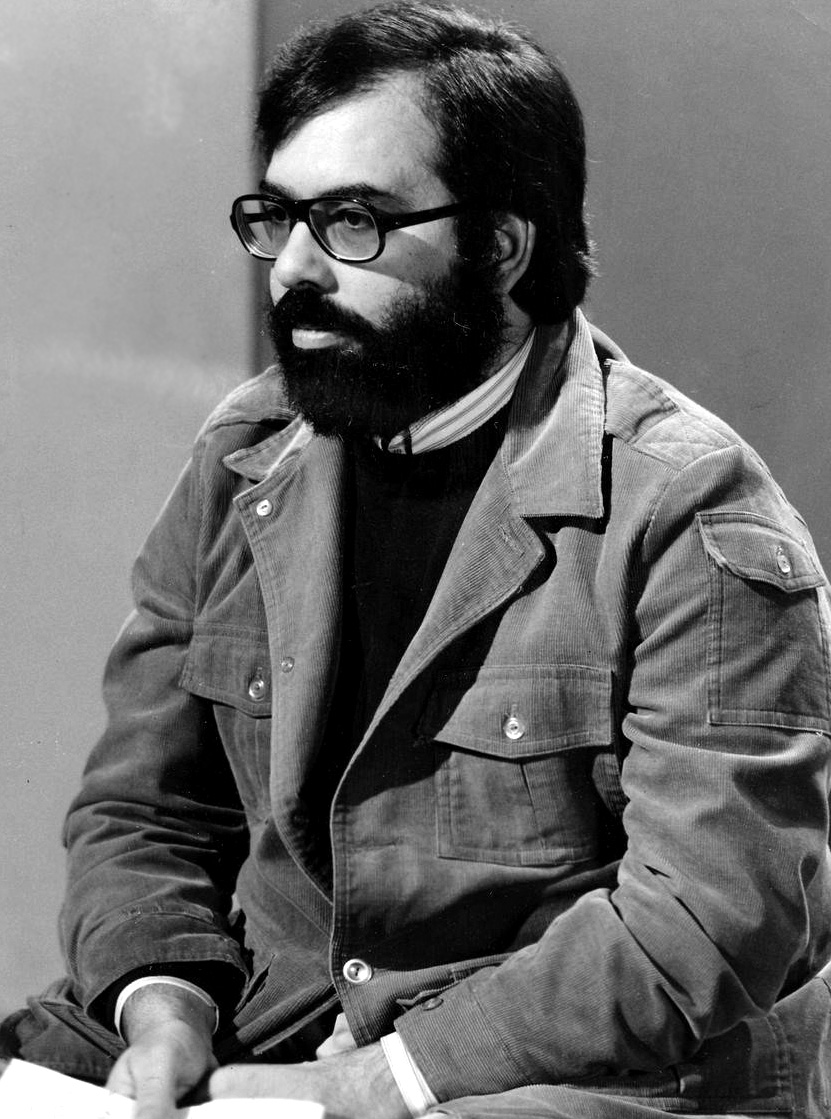
Francis Ford Coppola was nominated five times winning twice for The Godfather (1972) and The Godfather Part II (1974).

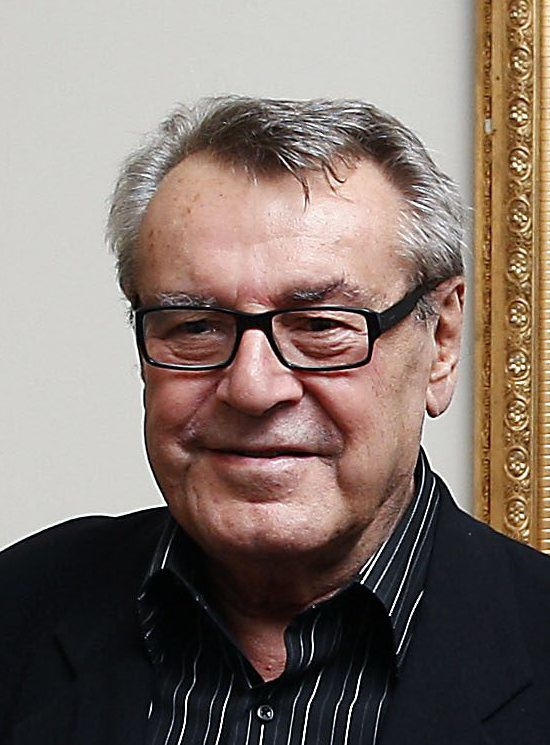
Milos Forman was nominated and won this award twice for One Flew Over the Cuckoo's Nest (1975) and Amadeus (1984).

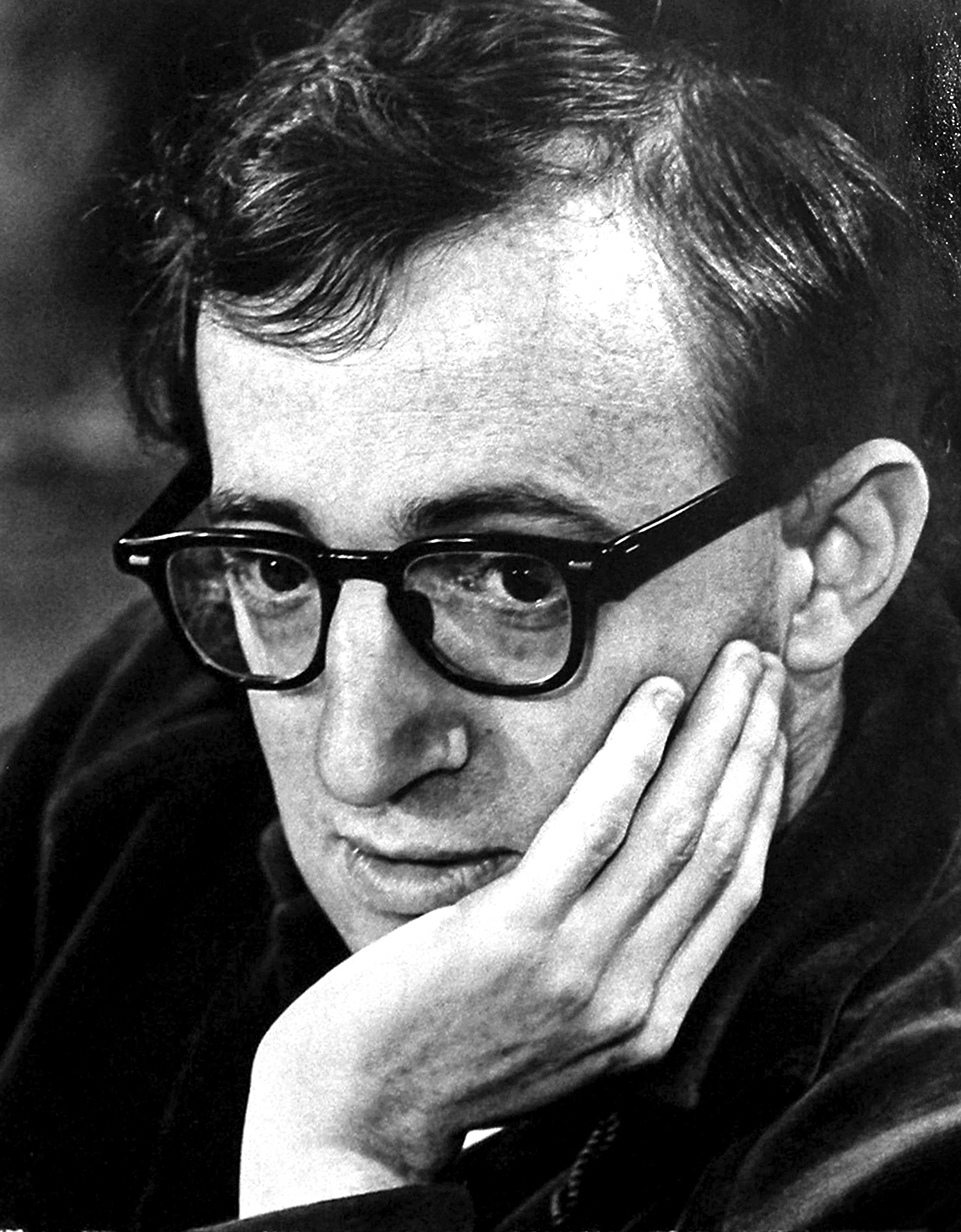
Woody Allen was nominated five times winning once for Annie Hall (1977).

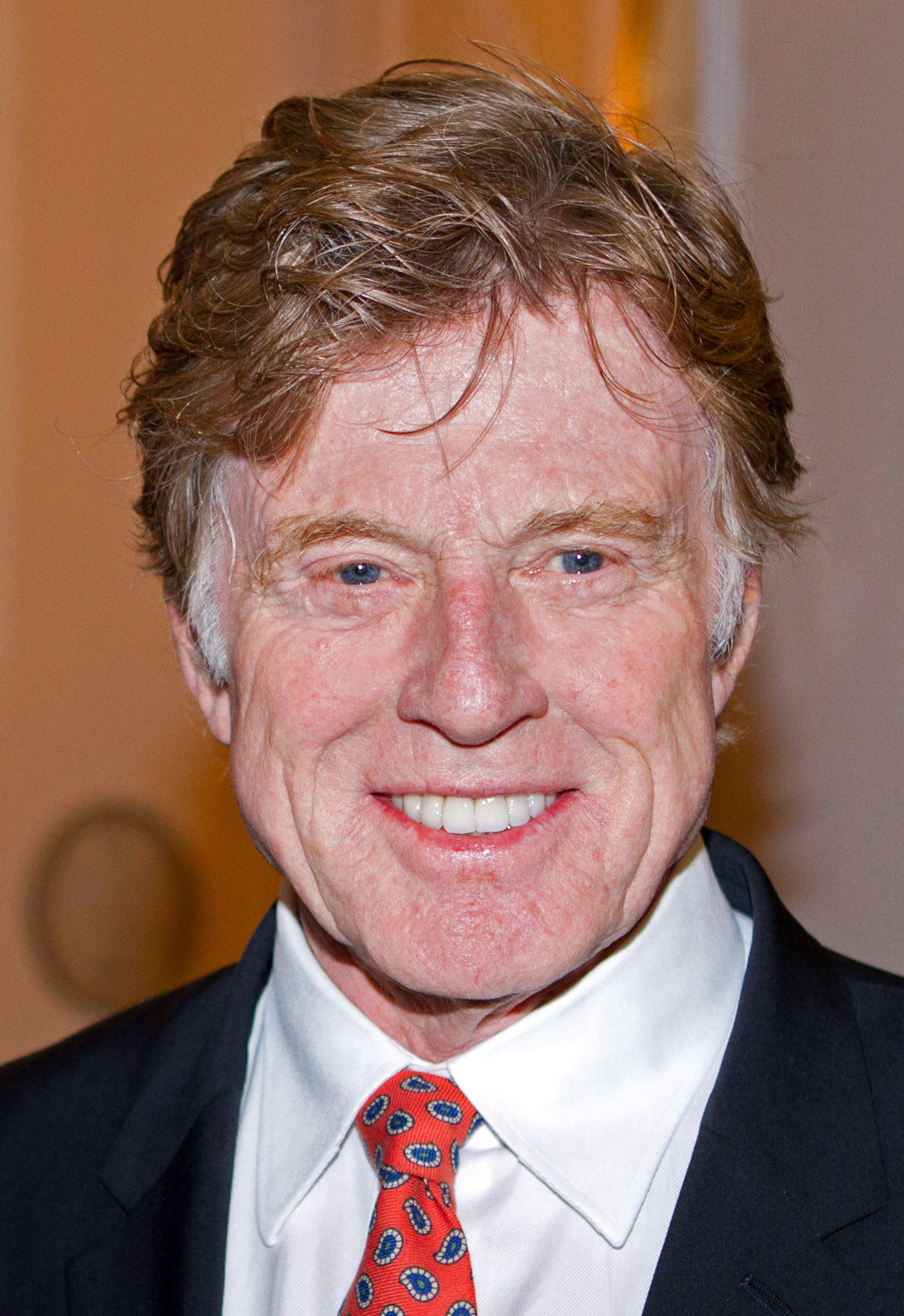
Robert Redford was nominated twice and won once for Ordinary People (1980).

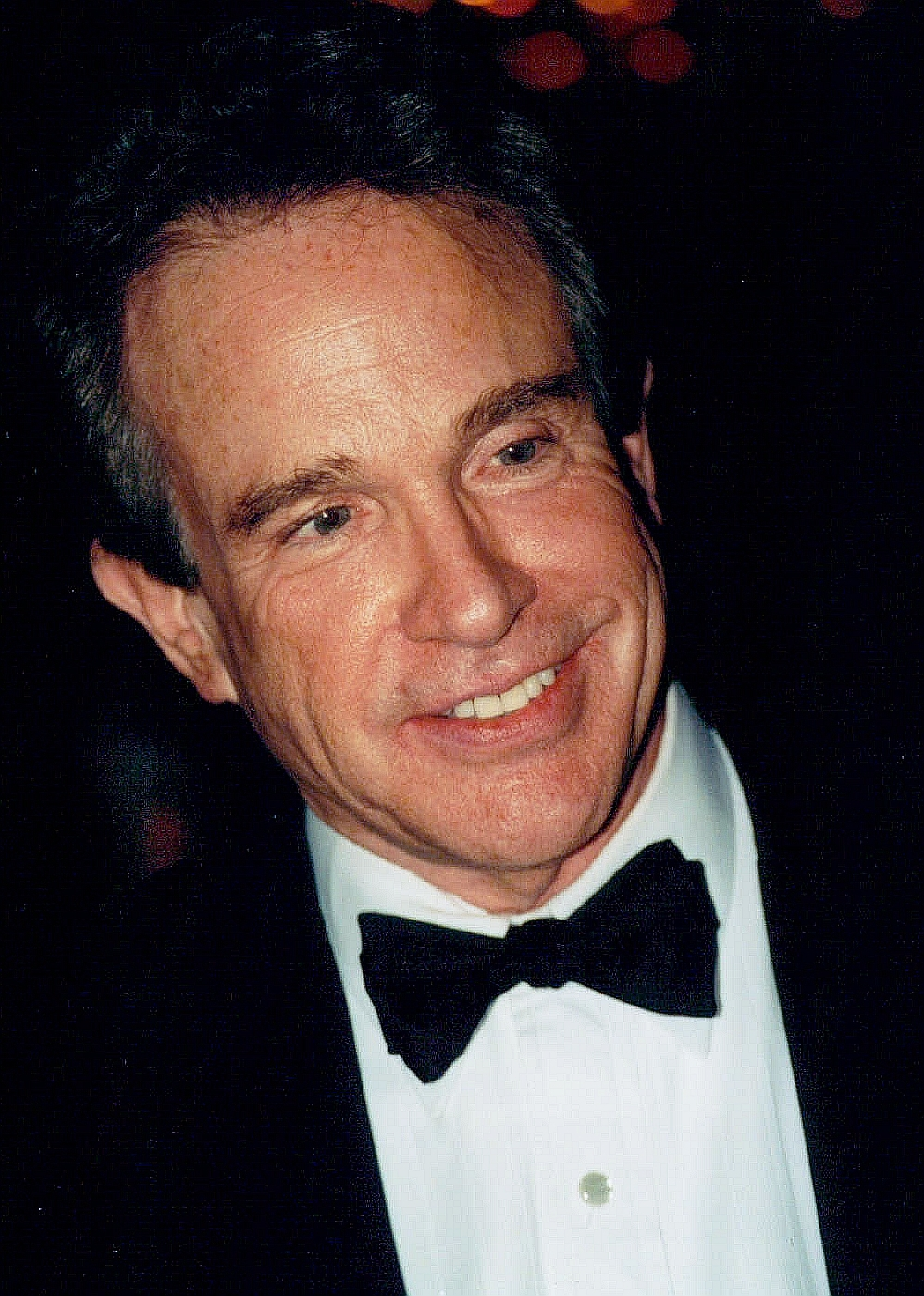
Warren Beatty was nominated twice and won once for Reds (1981).

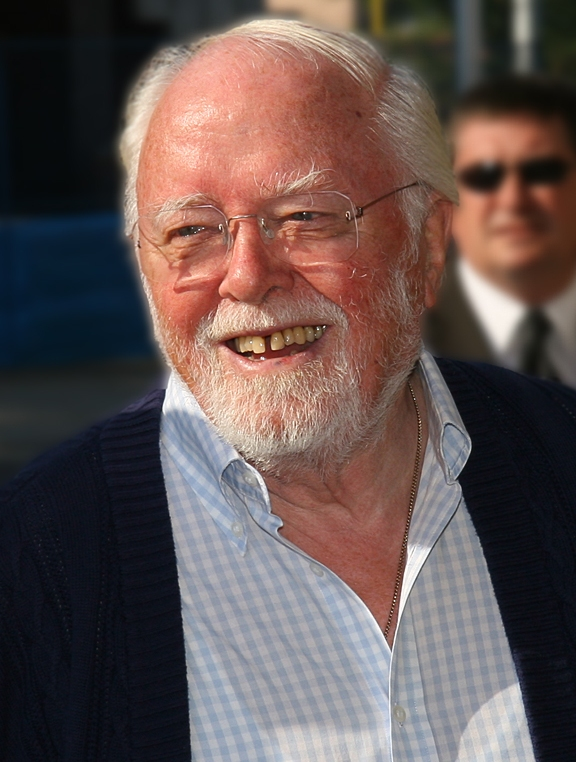
Lord Richard Attenborough was nominated twice and won once for Gandhi (1982).

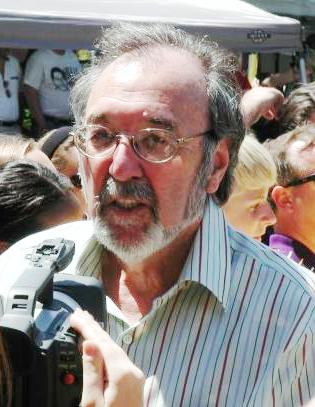
James L. Brooks was nominated thrice winning once for Terms of Endearment (1983).

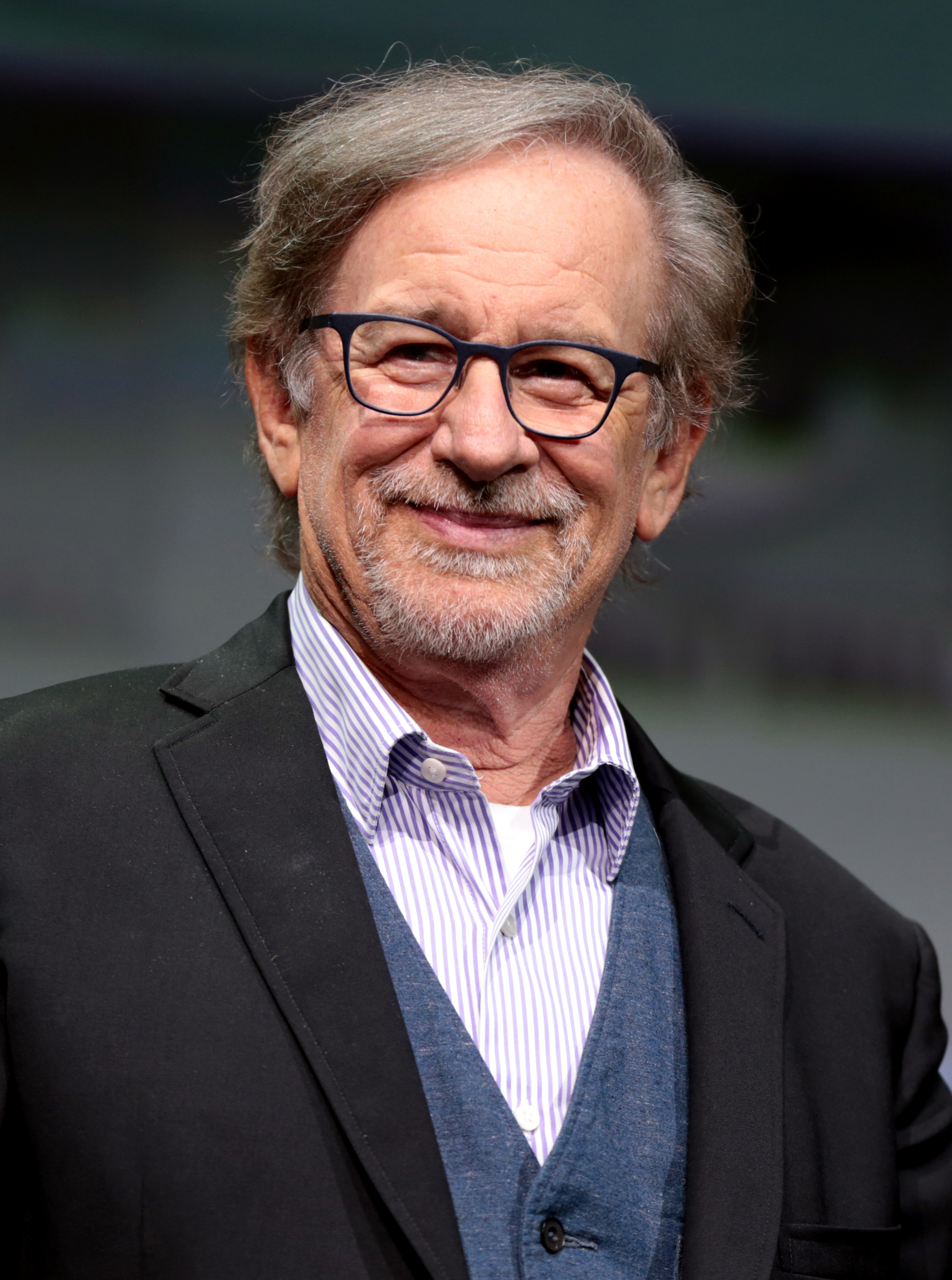
Steven Spielberg was nominated a record thirteen times, the most than anyone in this category, winning thrice for The Color Purple (1985), Schindler's List (1993) and Saving Private Ryan (1998).

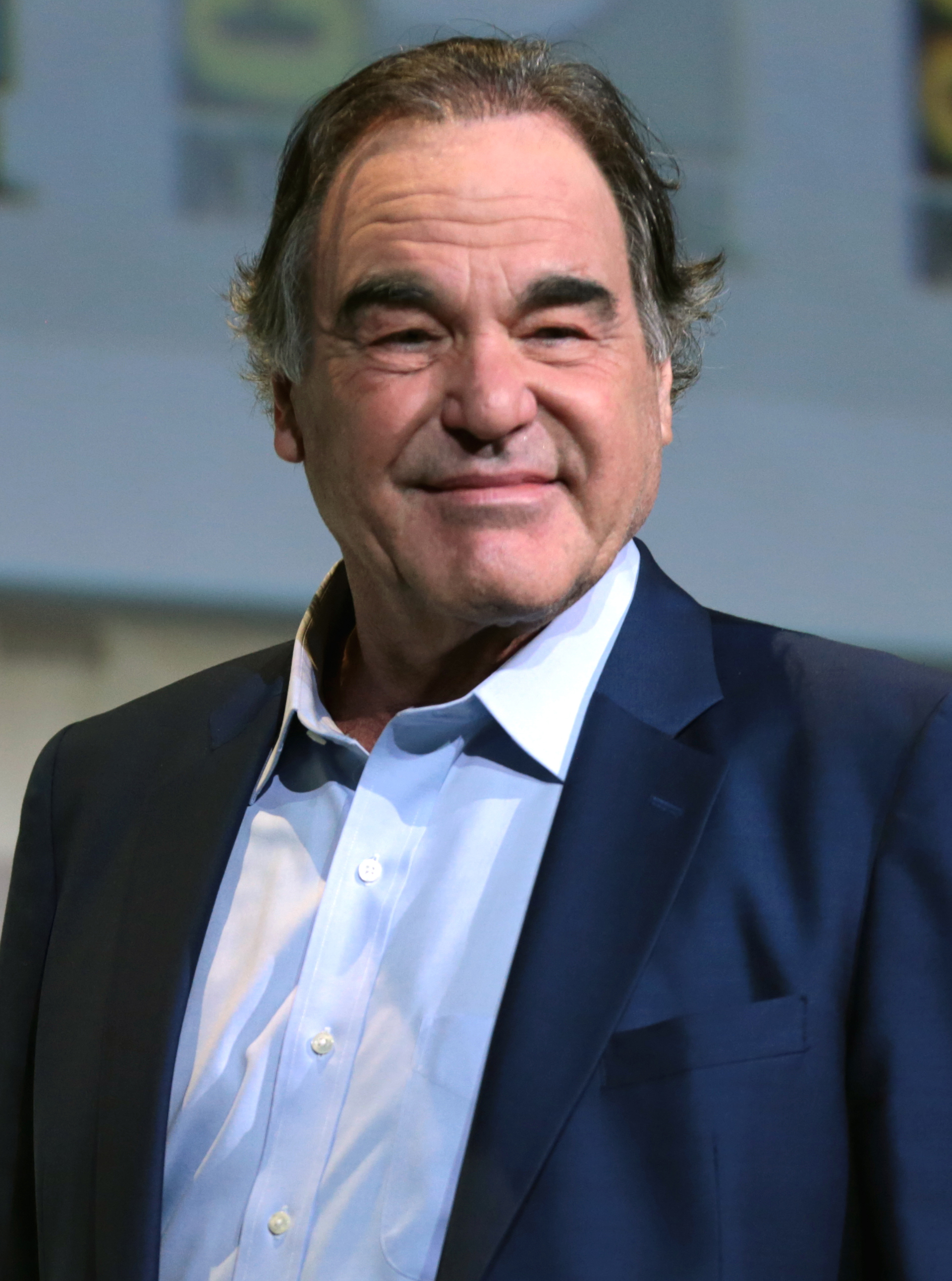
Oliver Stone was nominated thrice winning twice for Platoon (1986) and Born on the Fourth of July (1989).

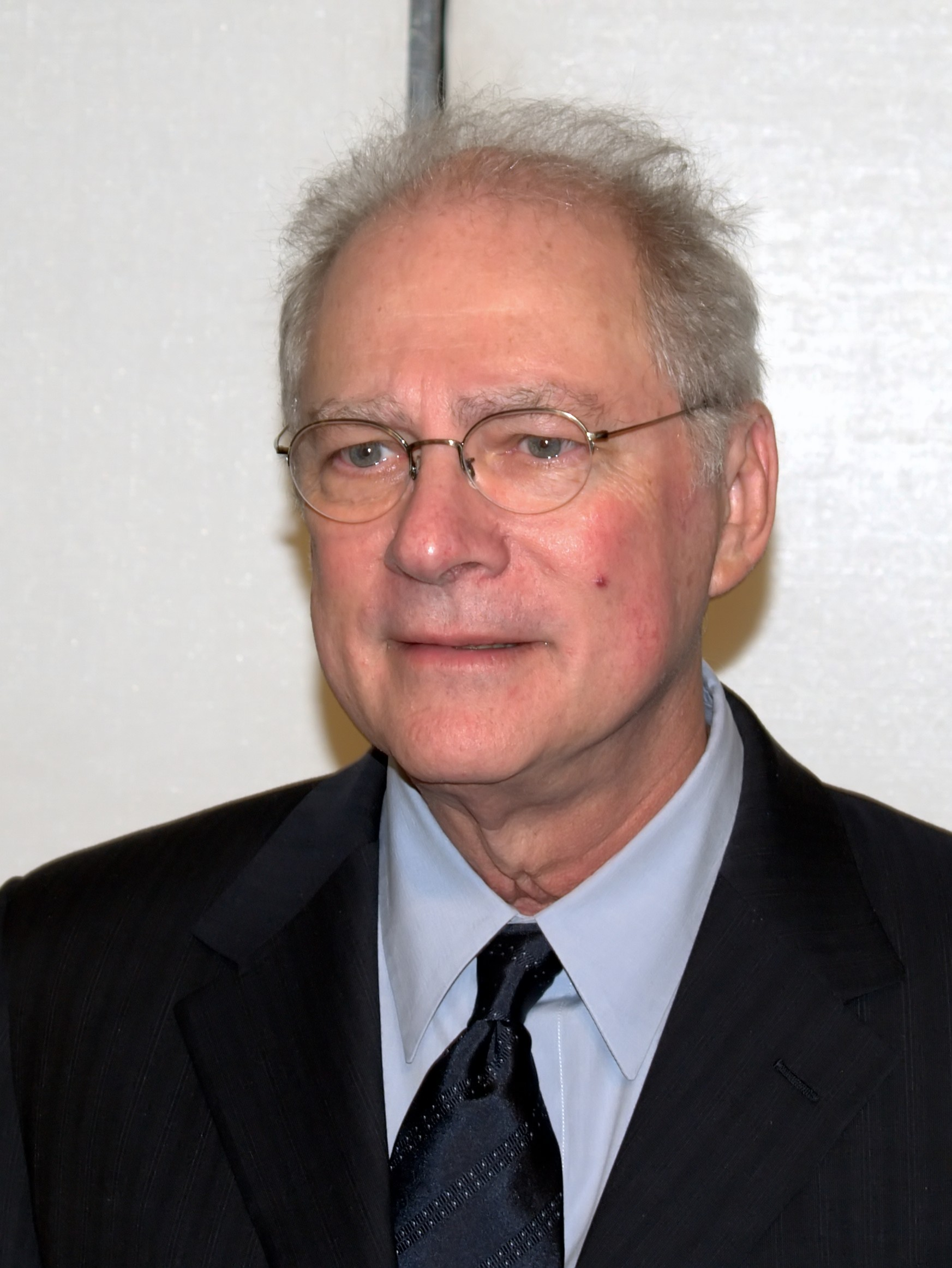
Barry Levinson was nominated thrice winning once for Rain Man (1988).

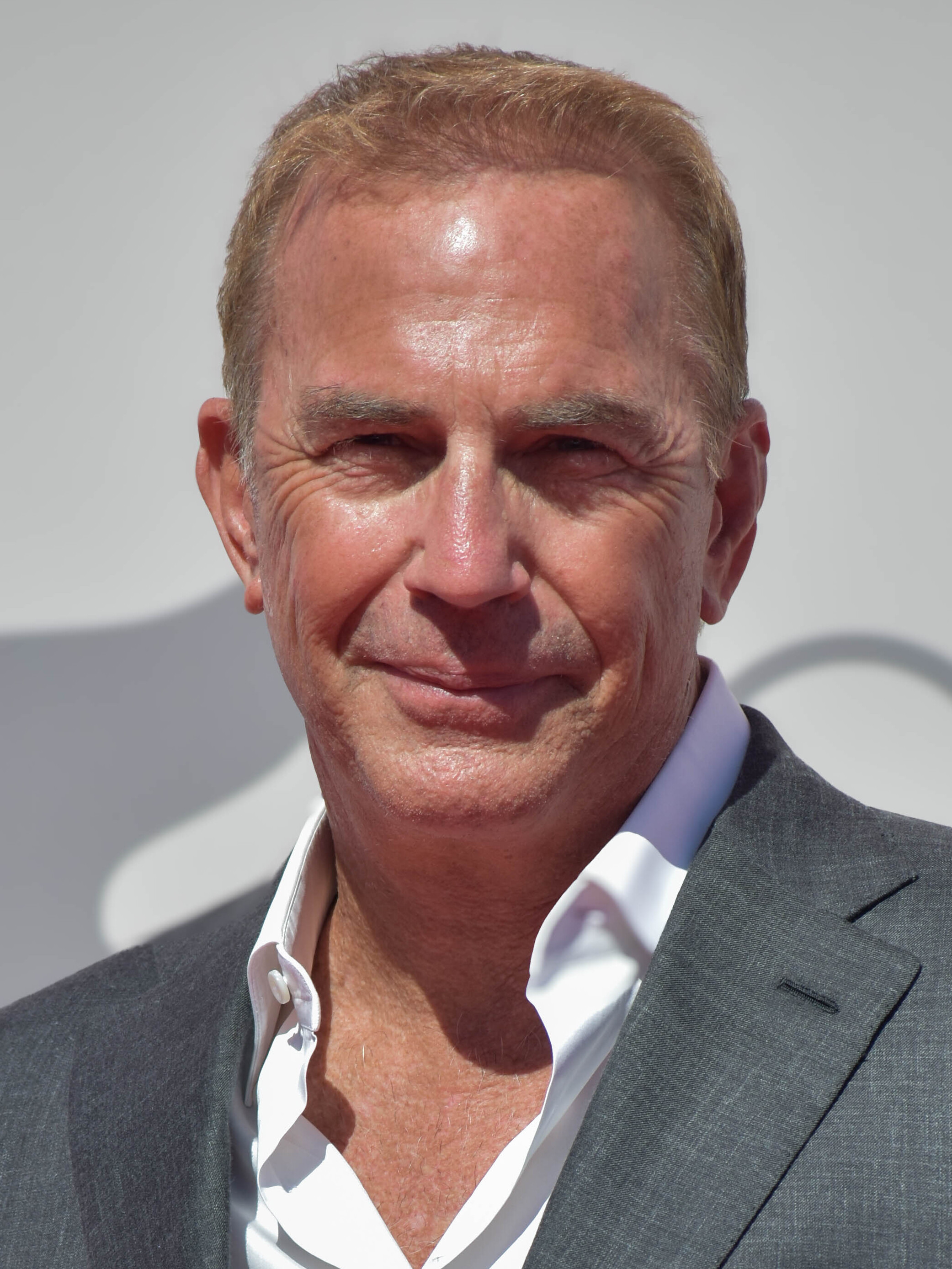
Kevin Costner was nominated and won once for Dances with Wolves (1990).

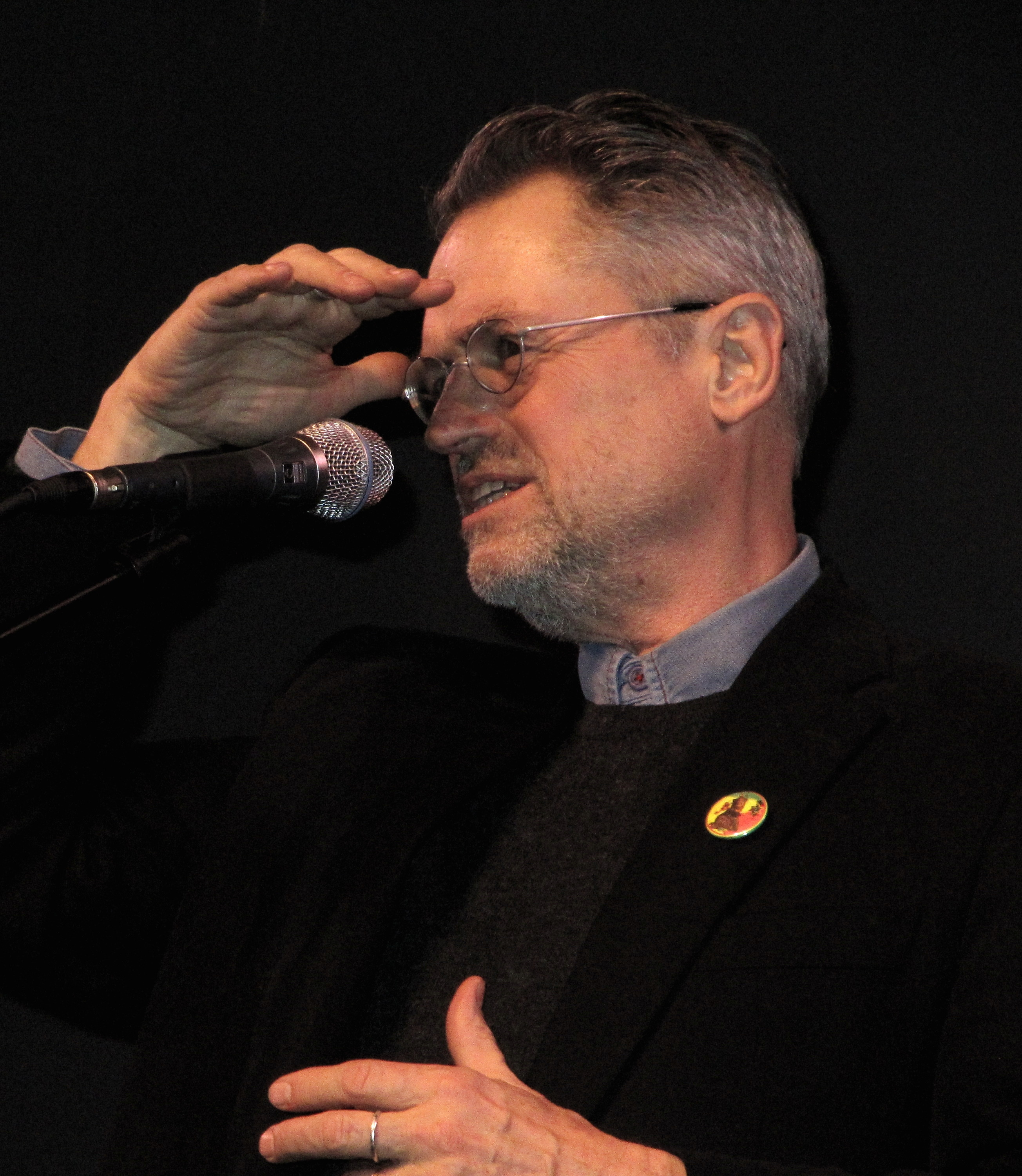
Jonathan Demme was nominated and won once for The Silence of the Lambs (1991).

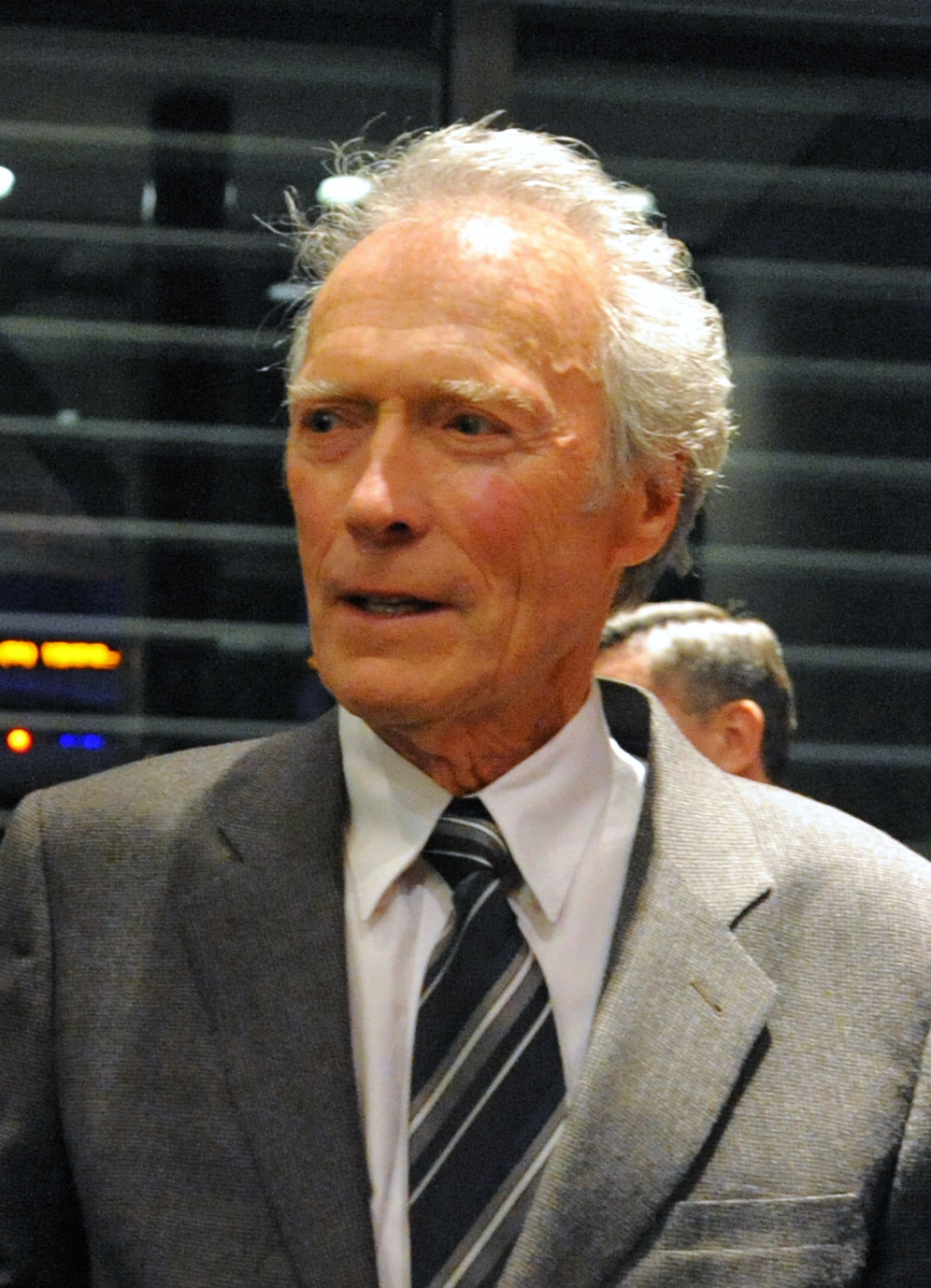
Clint Eastwood was nominated four times winning twice for Unforgiven (1992) and Million Dollar Baby (2004).

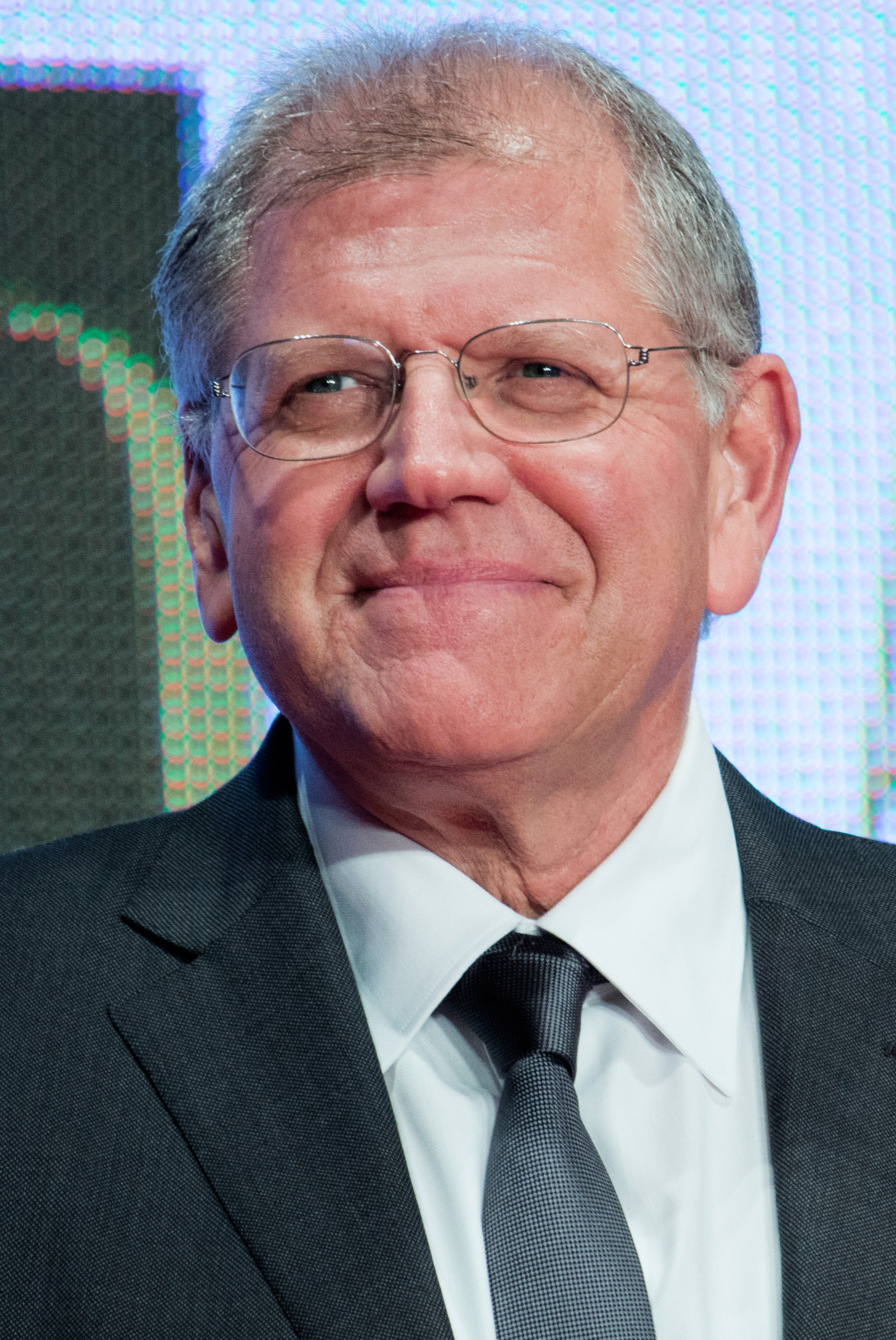
Robert Zemeckis was nominated twice winning once for Forrest Gump (1994).

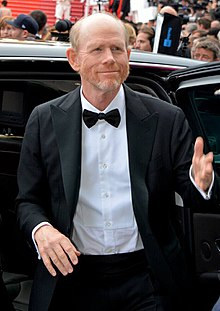
Ron Howard was nominated four times winning twice for Apollo 13 (1995) and A Beautiful Mind (2001).

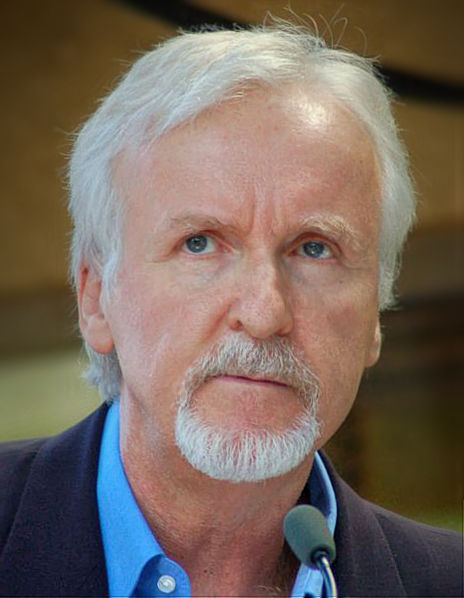
James Cameron was nominated twice winning once for Titanic (1997).

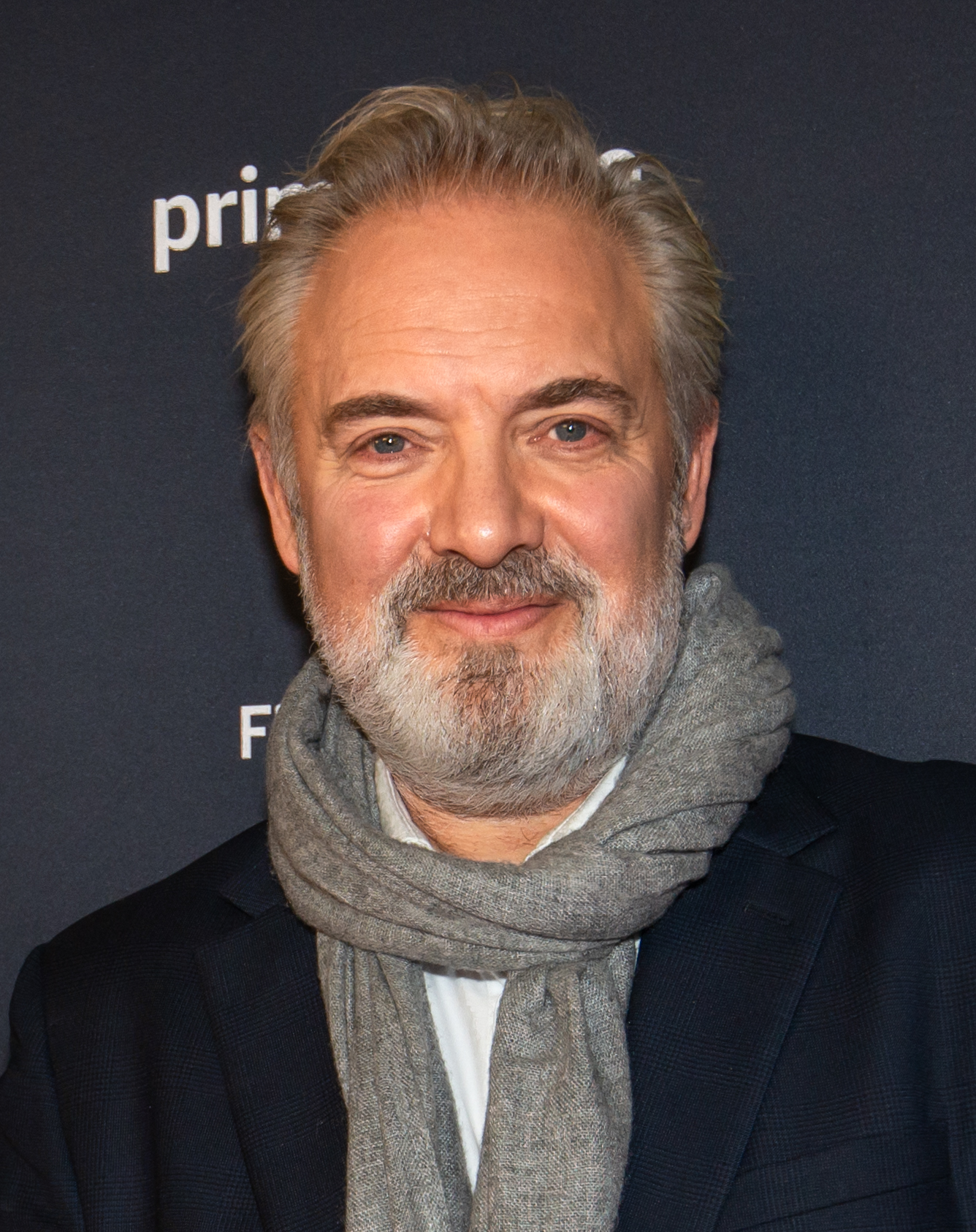
Sam Mendes was nominated and won twice for American Beauty (1999) and 1917 (2019).

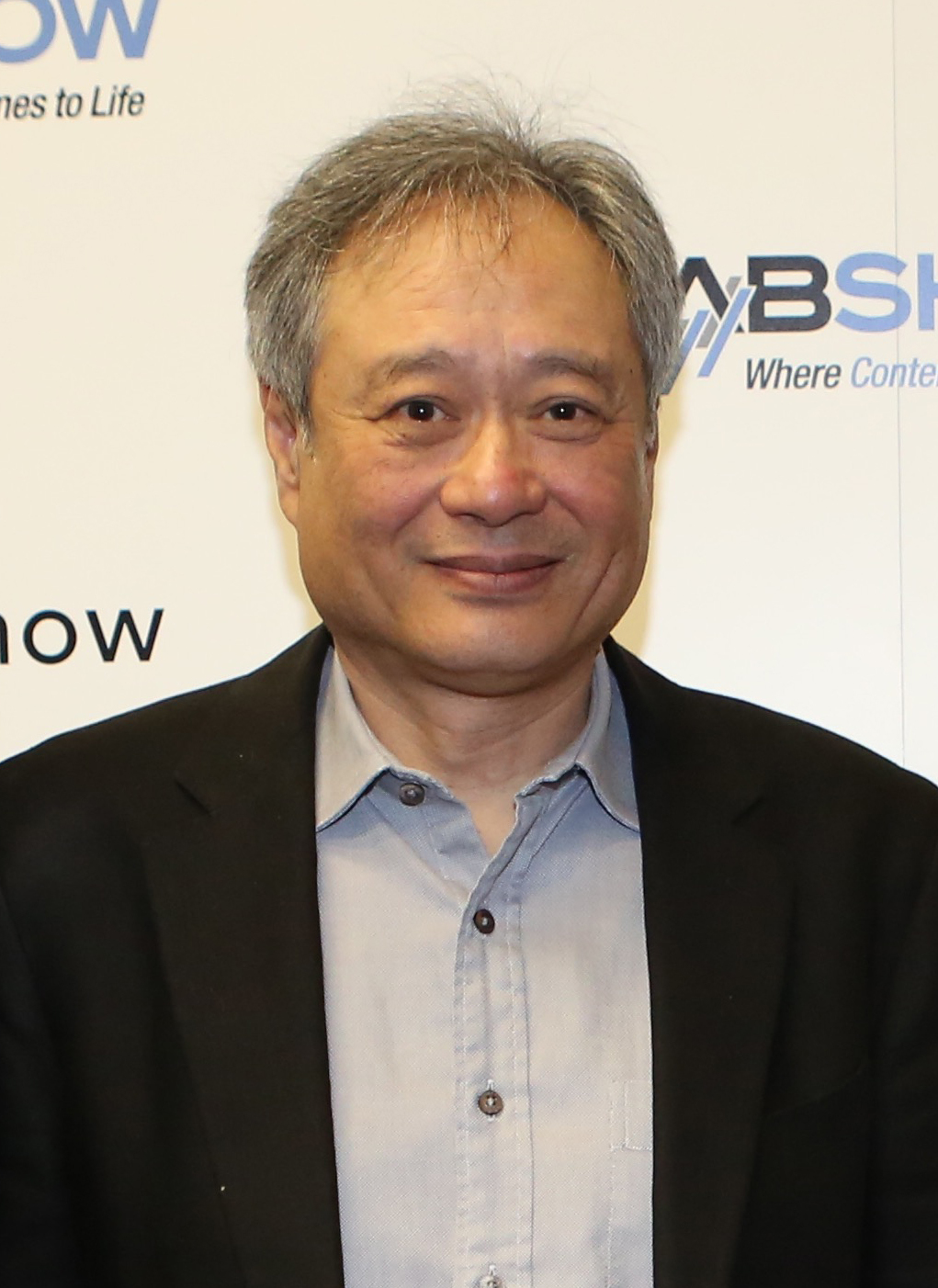
Ang Lee was nominated four times winning twice for Crouching Tiger, Hidden Dragon (2000) and Brokeback Mountain (2005).

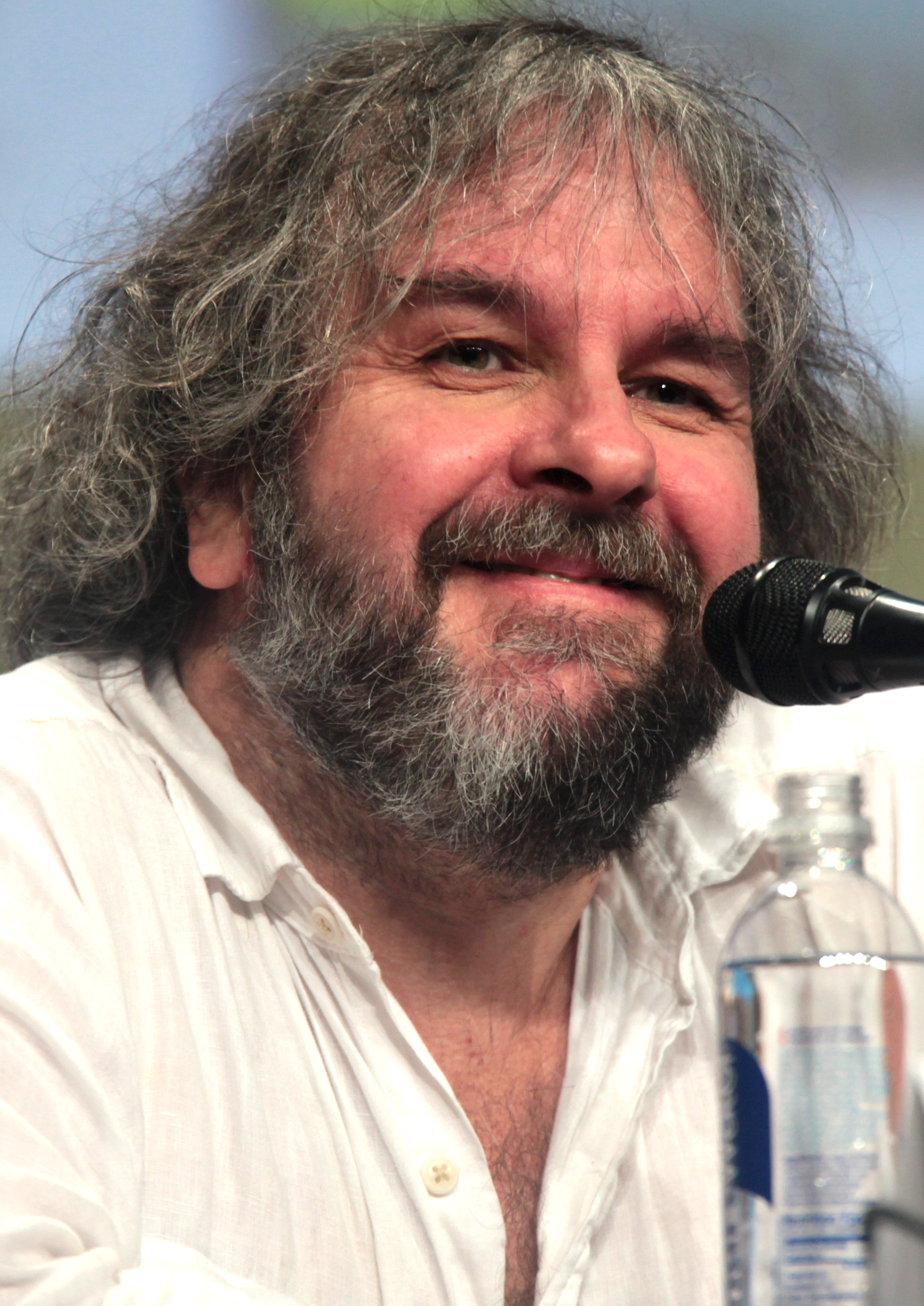
Peter Jackson was nominated thrice consecutively winning once for The Lord of the Rings: The Return of the King (2003).

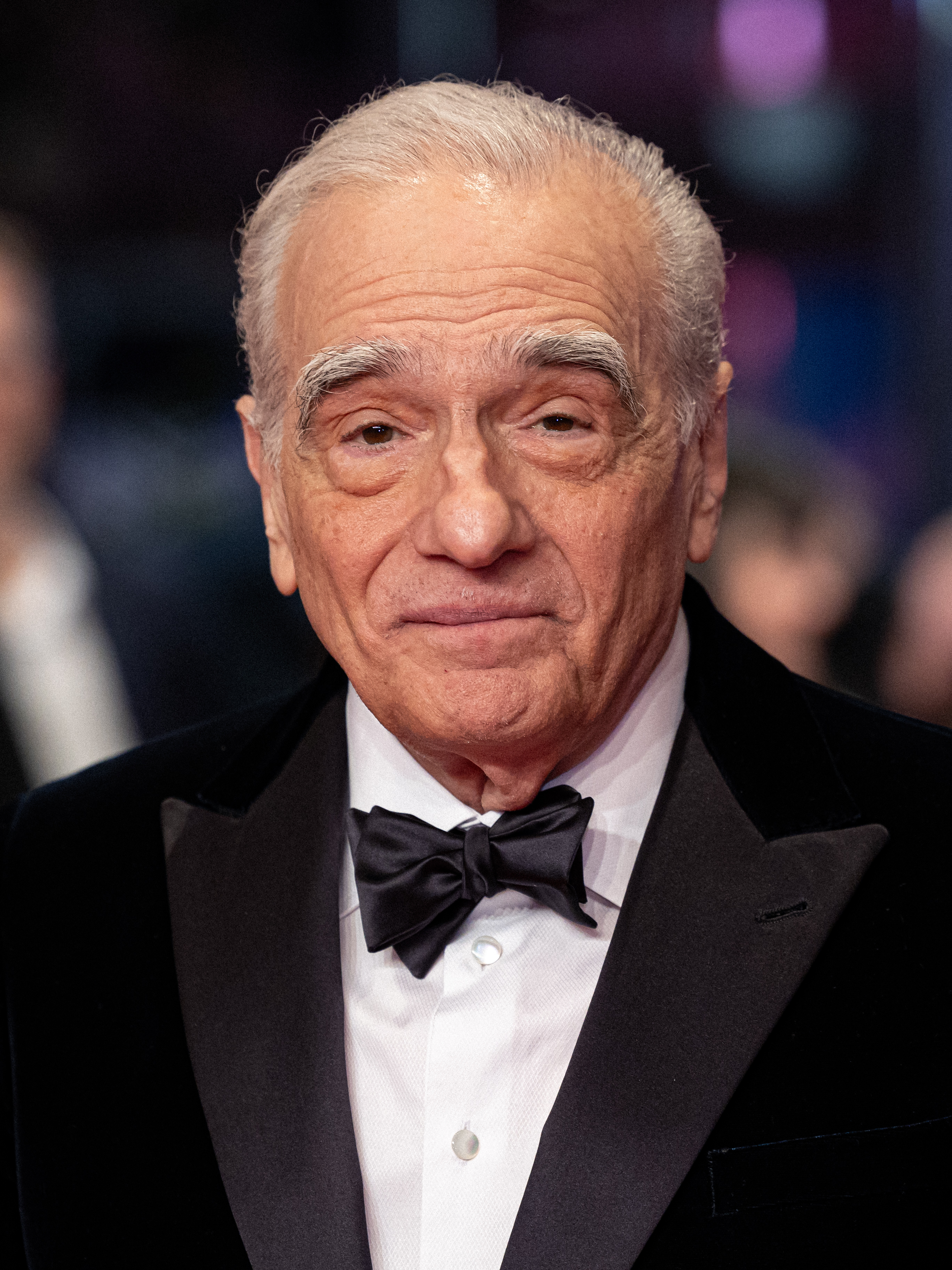
Martin Scorsese was nominated 11 times winning only once for The Departed (2006).

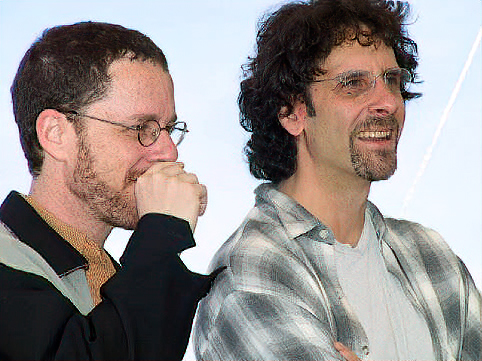
Joel and Ethan Coen won together for No Country for Old Men (2007).

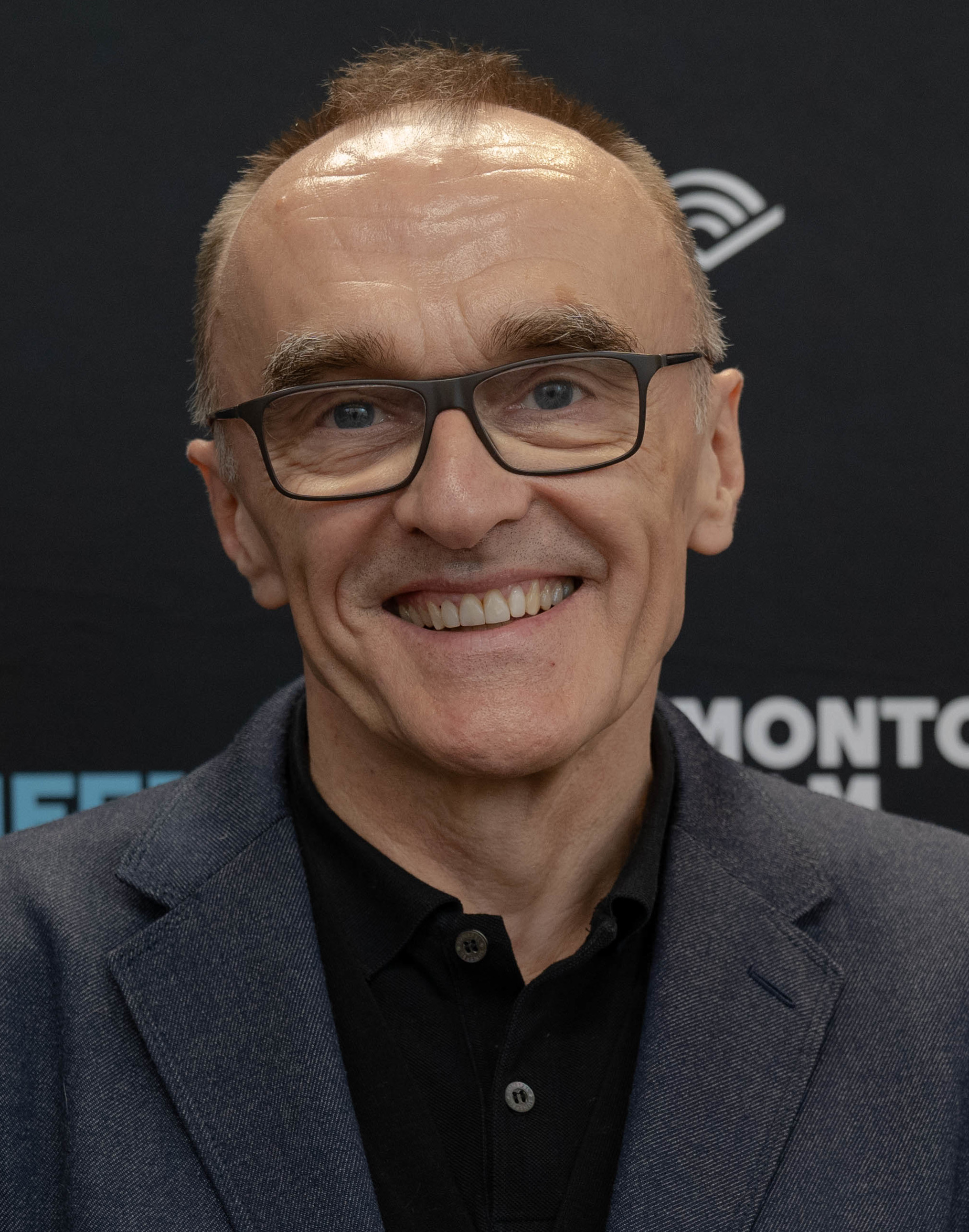
Danny Boyle won for Slumdog Millionaire (2008).

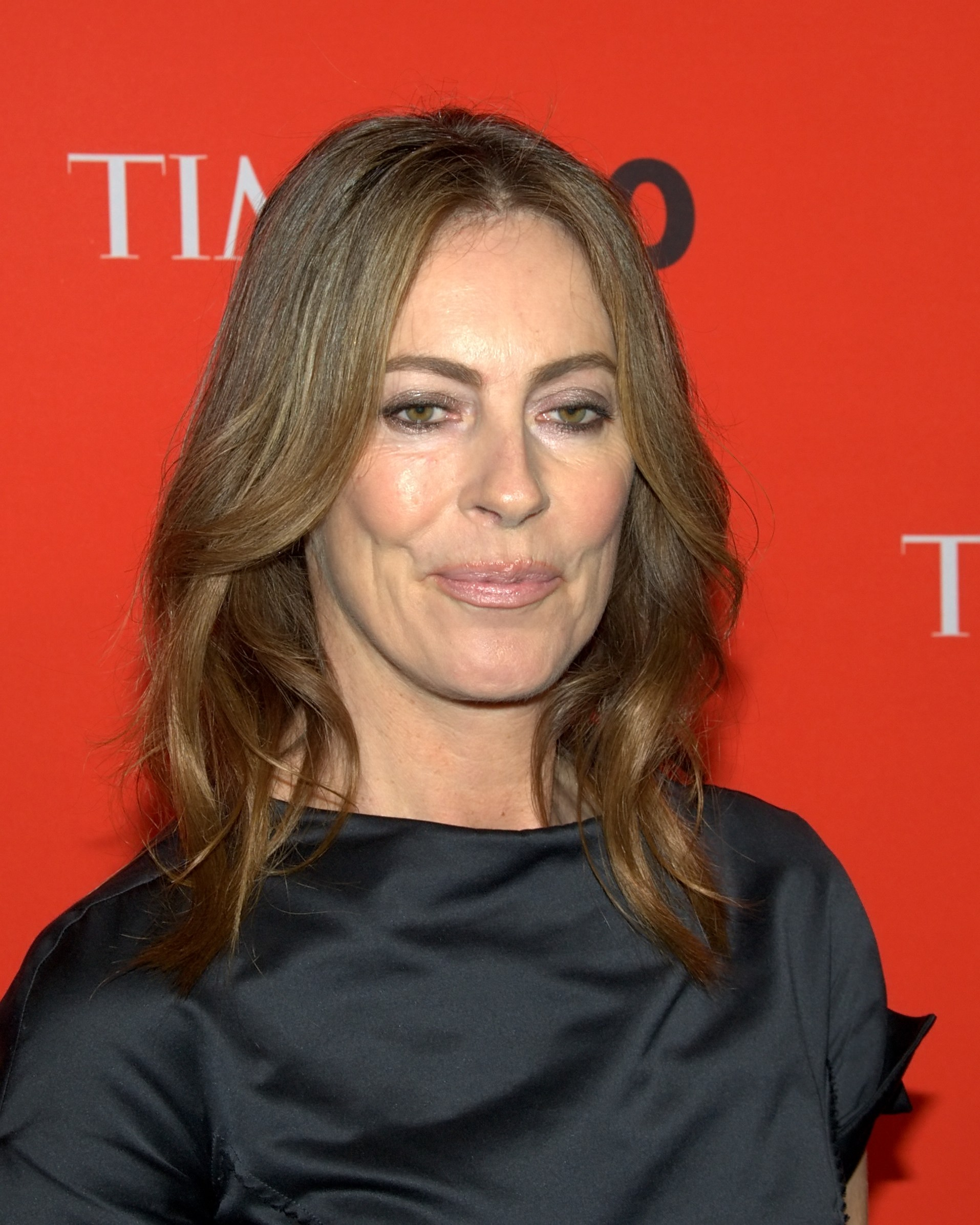
Kathryn Bigelow won for The Hurt Locker (2009).

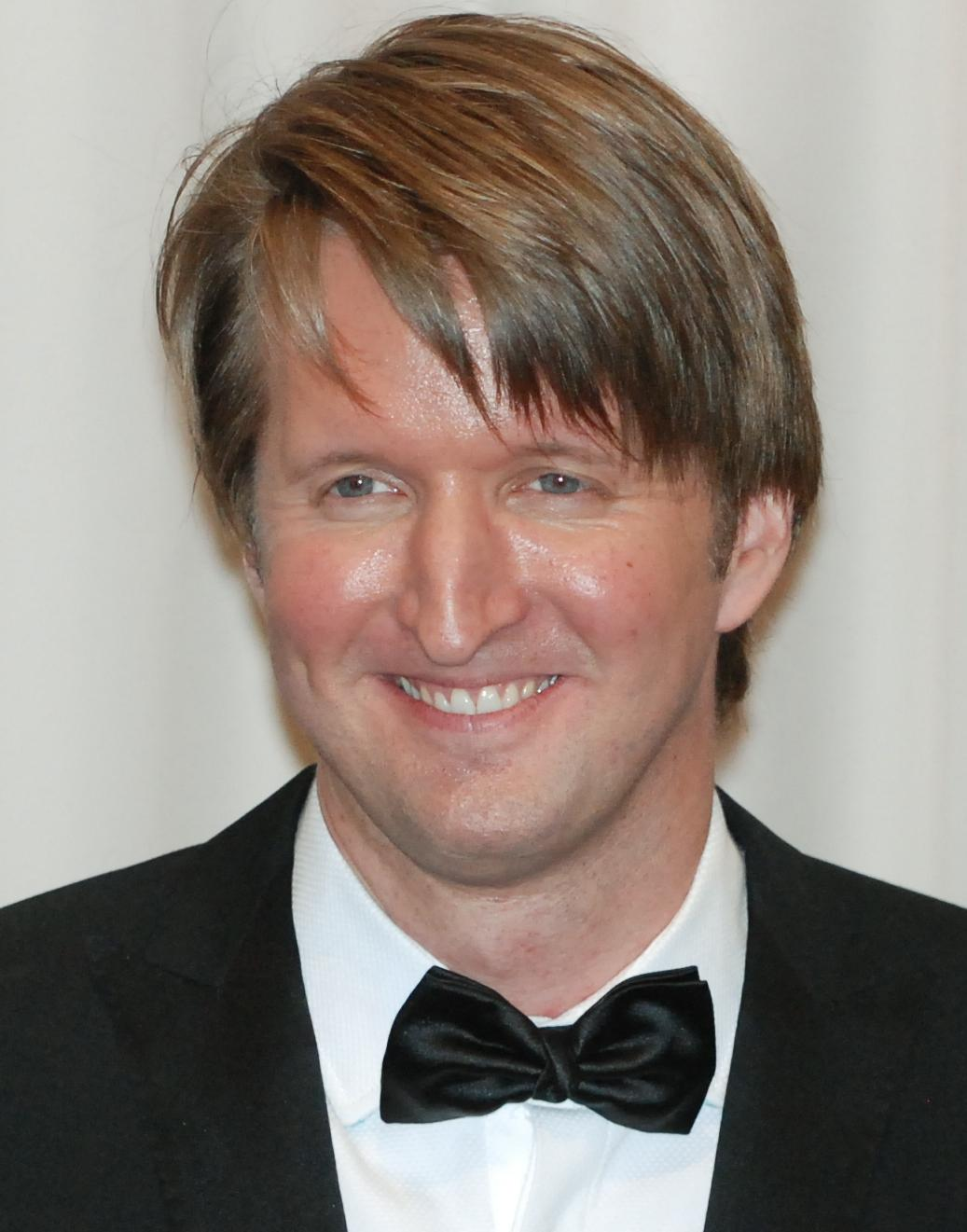
Tom Hooper won for The King's Speech (2010).

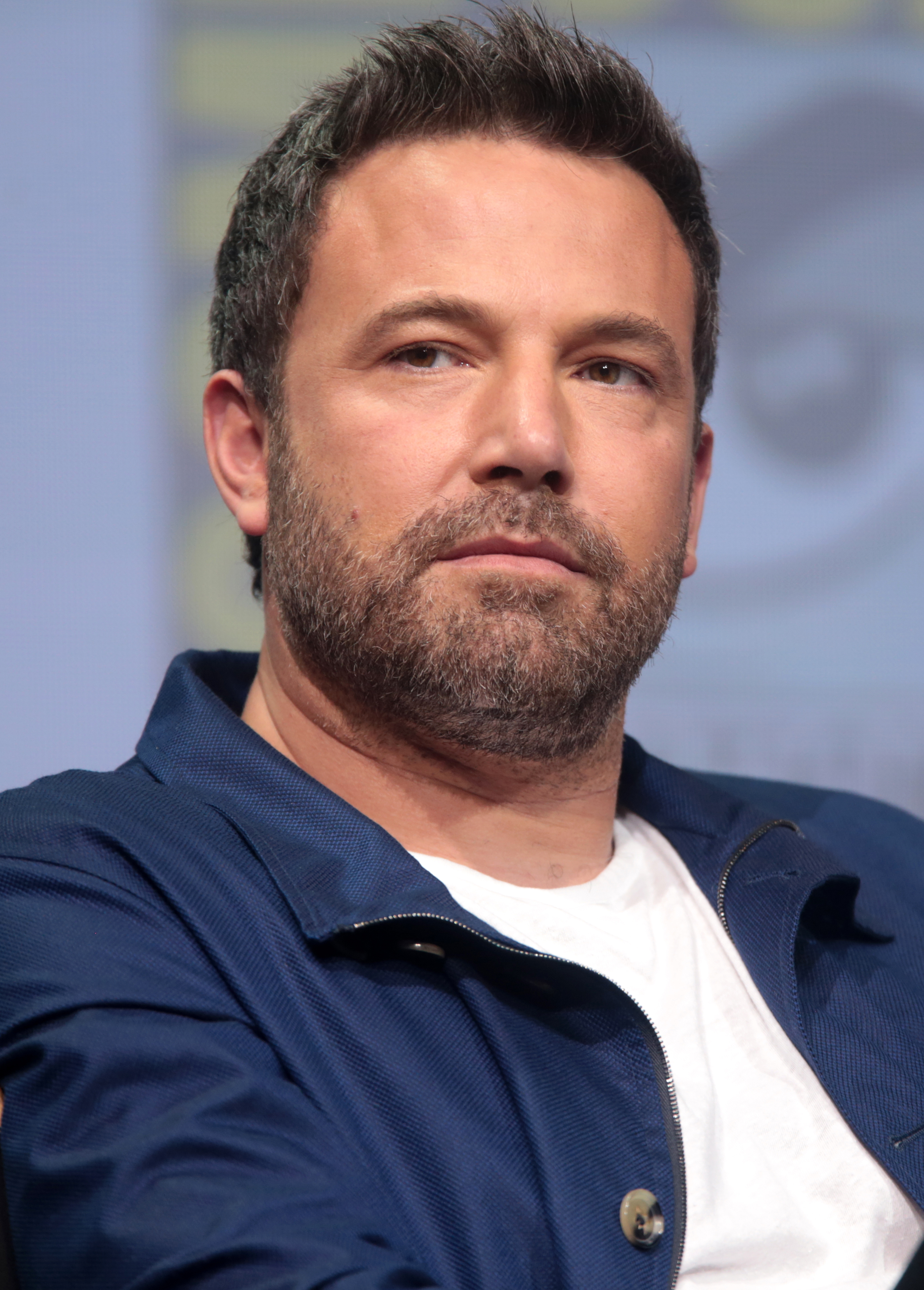
Ben Affleck won for Argo (2013).

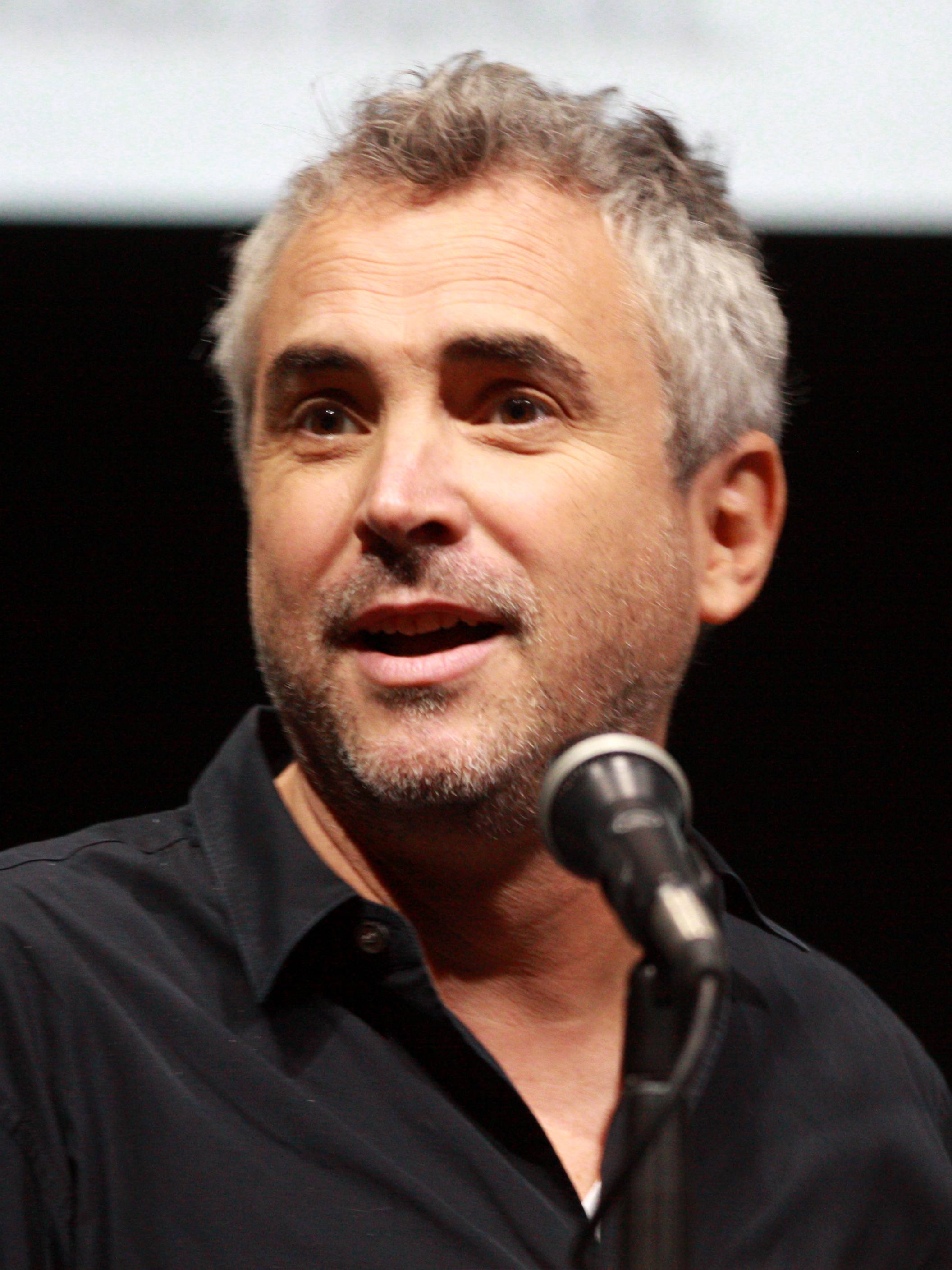
Alfonso Cuarón won twice for Gravity (2013) and Roma (2018).

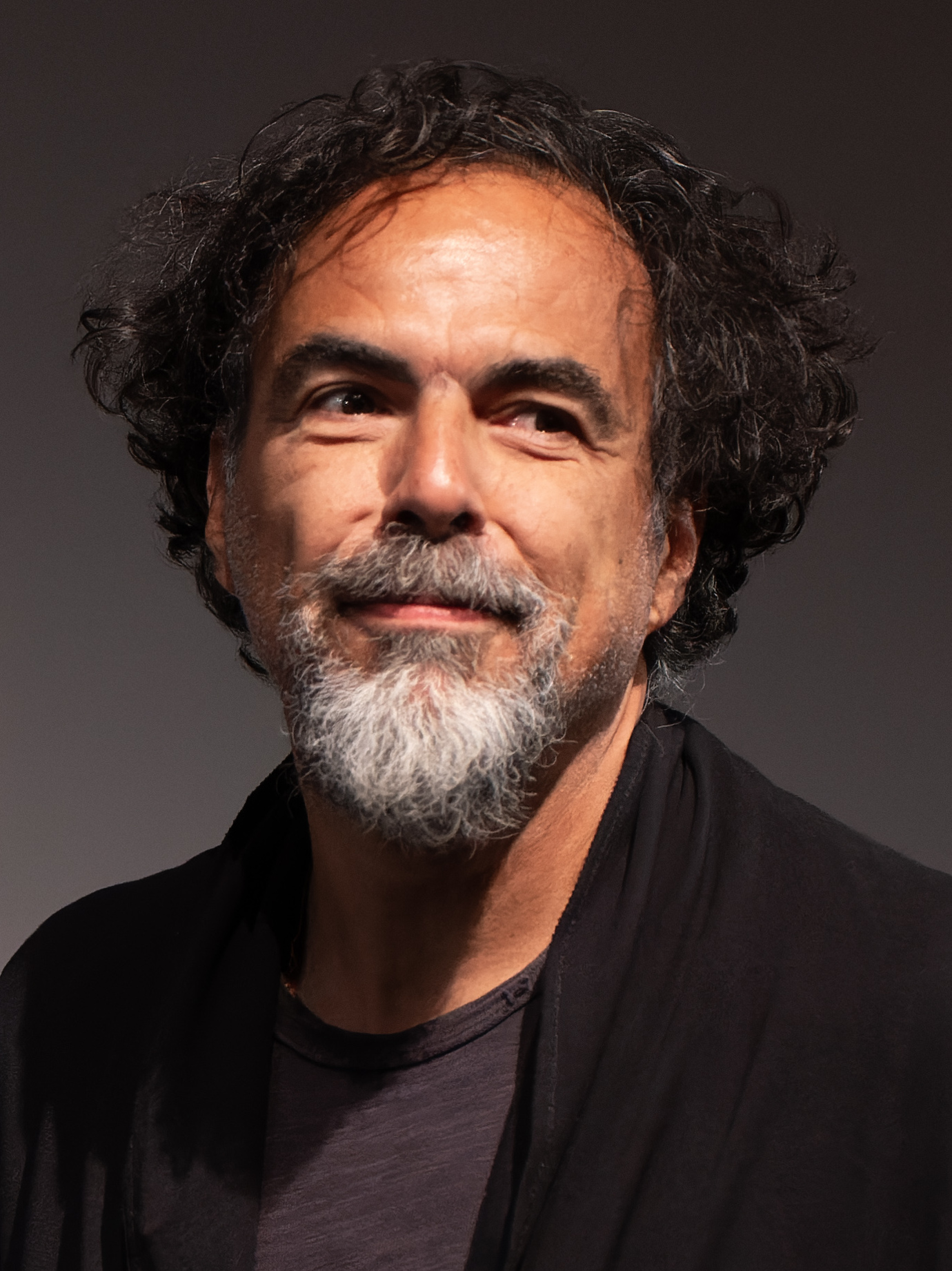
Alejandro G. Iñárritu won twice consecutively for Birdman (2014) and The Revenant (2015).

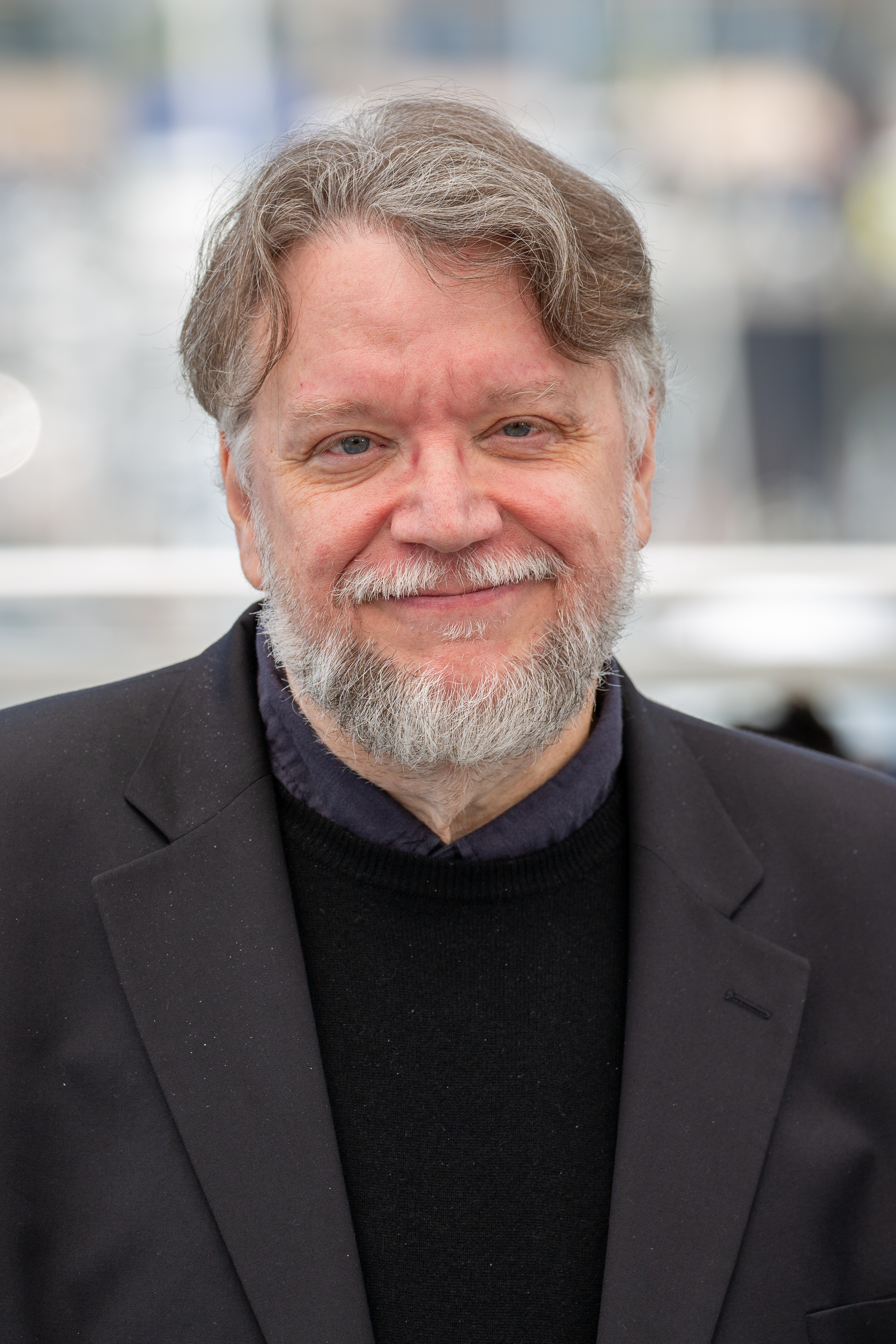
Guillermo del Toro won for The Shape of Water (2017).

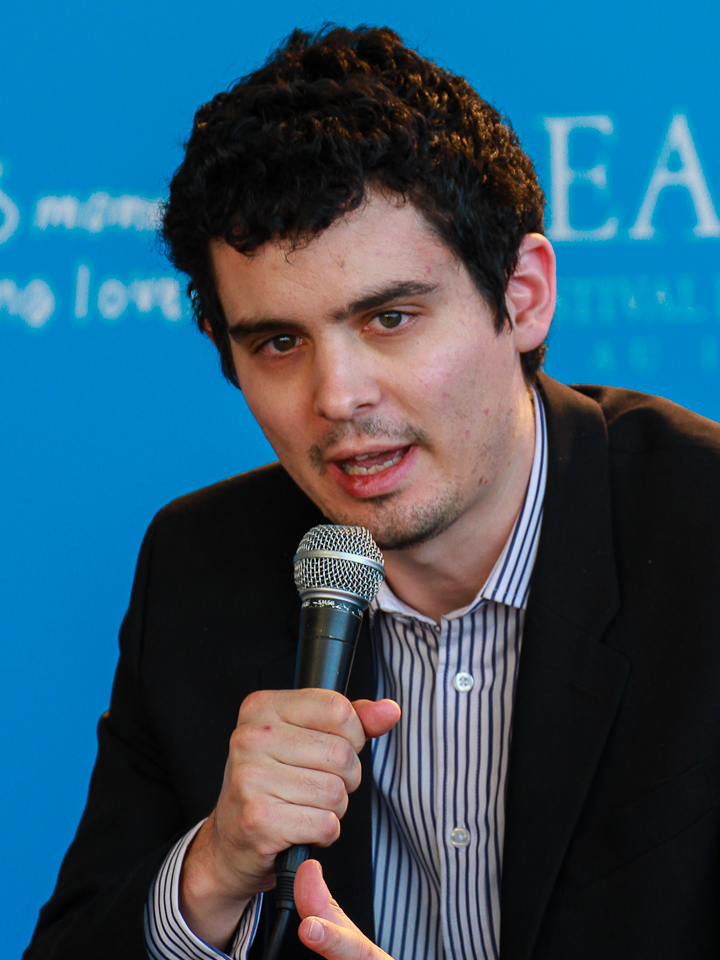
Damien Chazelle won for La La Land (2016).

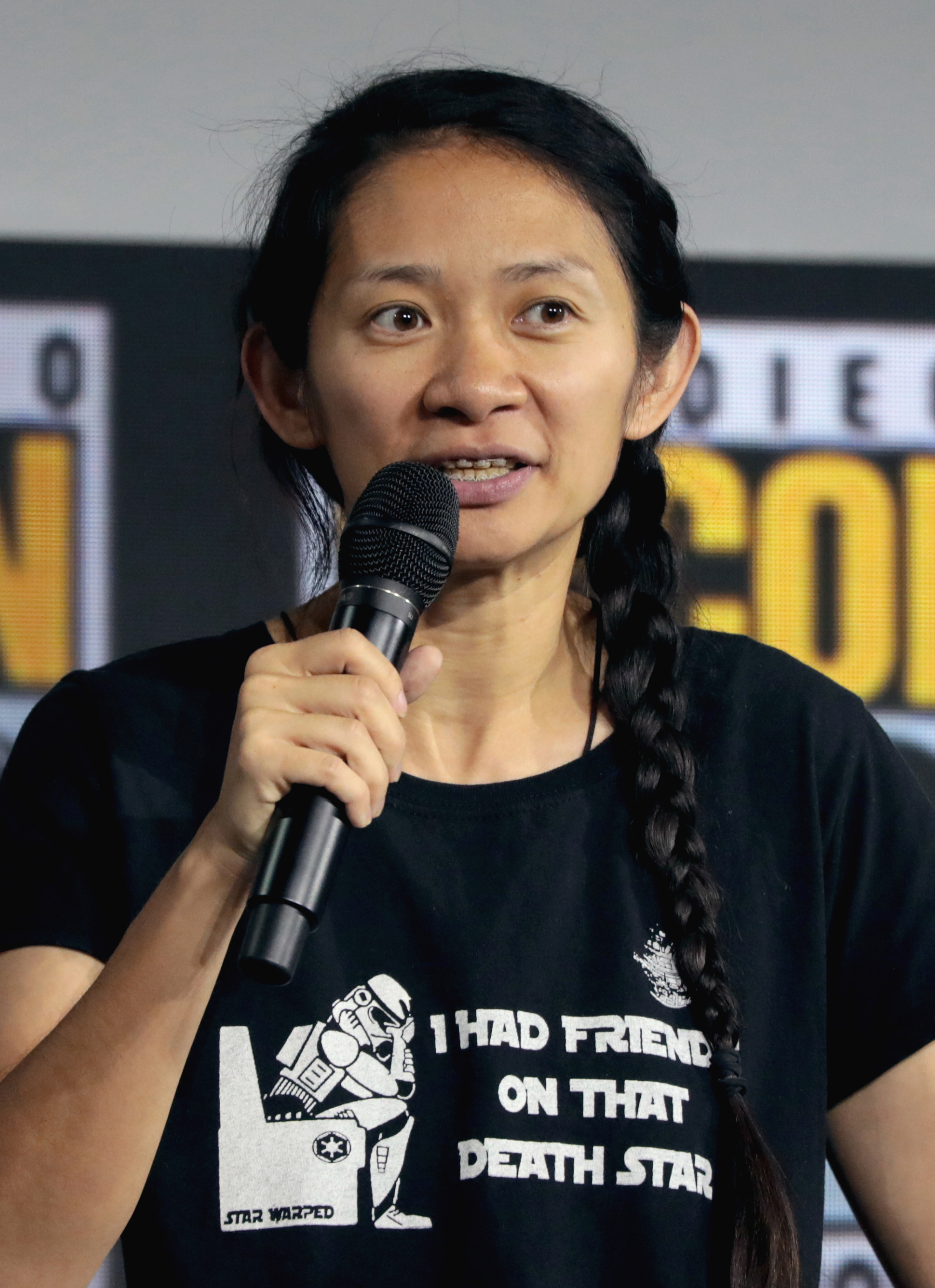
Chloe Zhao won for Nomadland (2020).

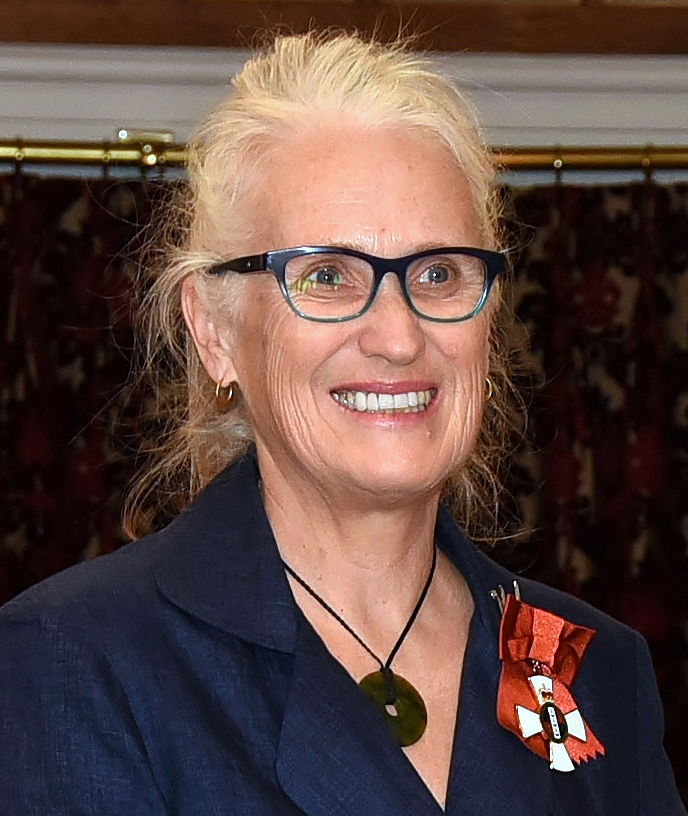
Jane Campion won for The Power of the Dog (2021).

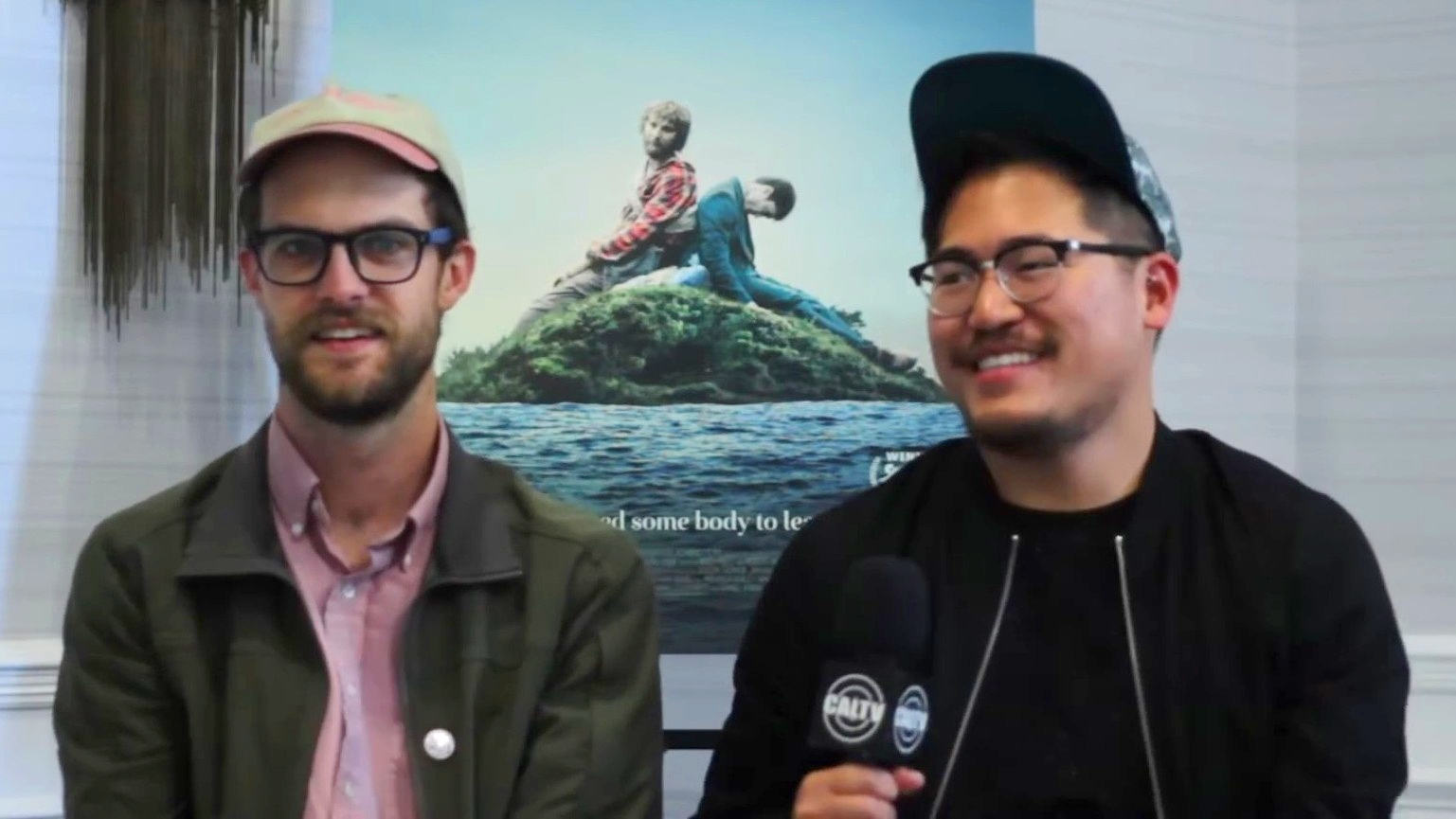
The Daniels won for their film Everything Everywhere All at Once (2022).

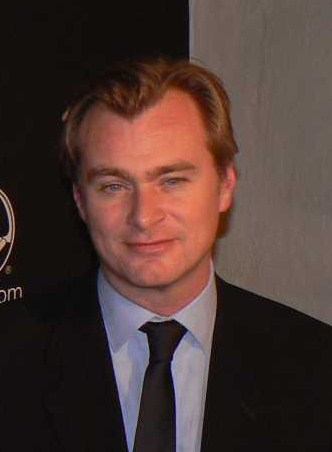
Christopher Nolan won for Oppenheimer (2023).

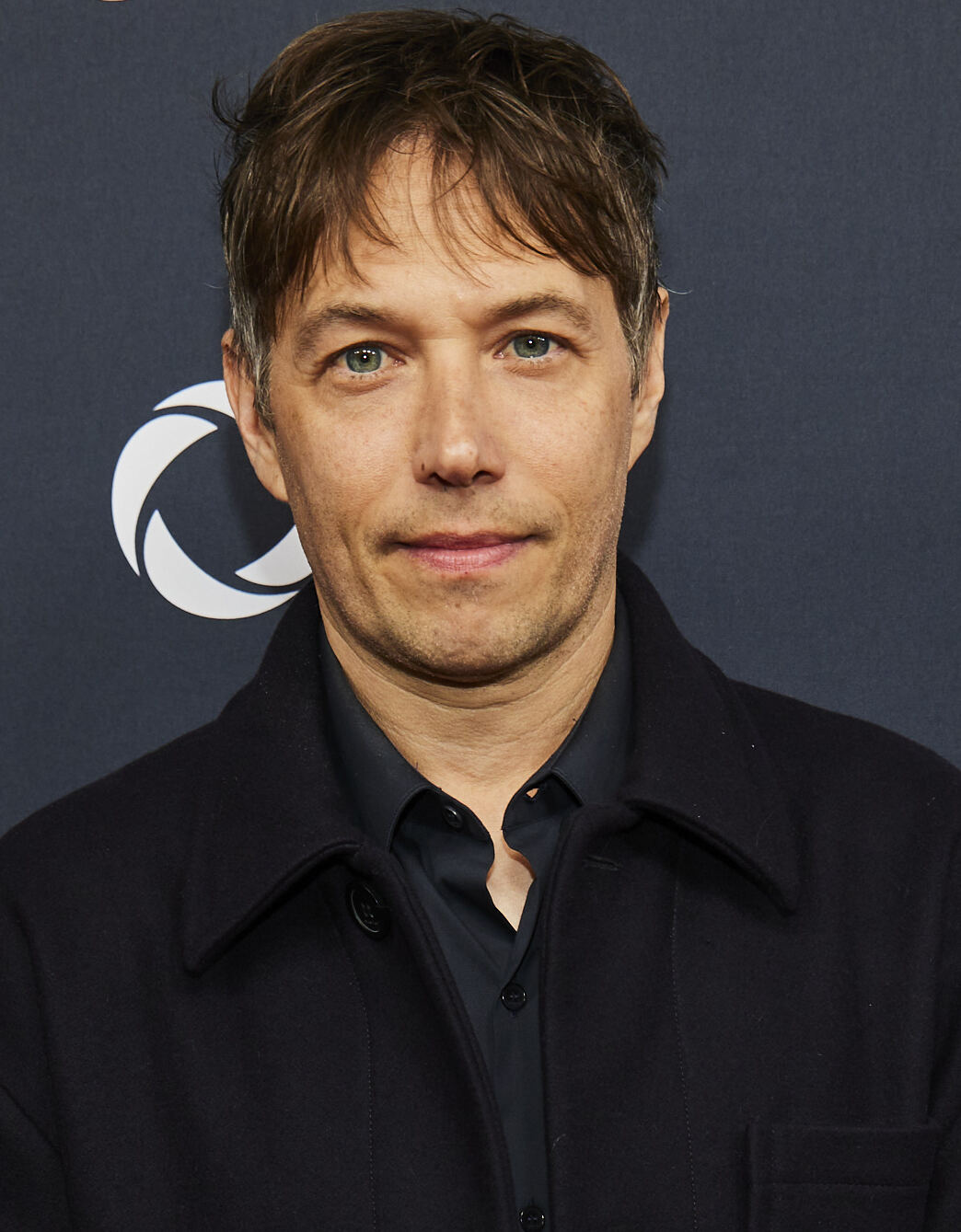
Sean Baker won for Anora (2025).

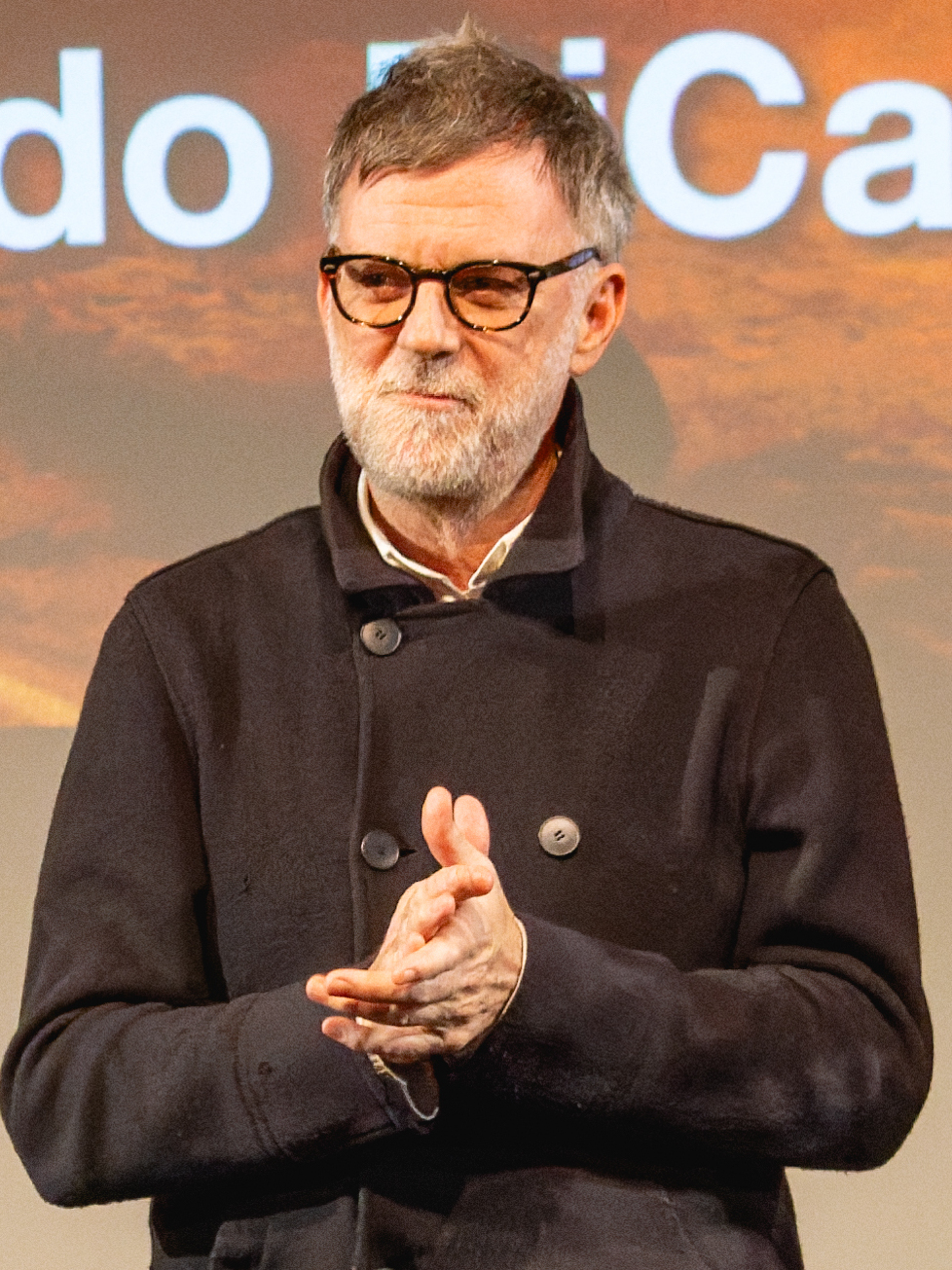
Paul Thomas Anderson won for One Battle After Another (2026).

=== 1940s ===
Year	Winners and nominees	Film	Ref.
1948 (1st)	Joseph L. Mankiewicz	A Letter to Three Wives	
1948 (1st)	Howard Hawks	Red River	
1948 (1st)	Anatole Litvak	The Snake Pit	
1948 (1st)	Fred Zinnemann	The Search	
1949 (2nd)	Robert Rossen	All the King's Men	
1949 (2nd)	Carol Reed	The Third Man	
1949 (2nd)	Mark Robson	Champion	
1949 (2nd)	Alfred L. Werker	Lost Boundaries	

=== 1950s ===
Year	Winners and nominees	Film	Ref.
1950 (3rd)	Joseph L. Mankiewicz	All About Eve	
1950 (3rd)	John Huston	The Asphalt Jungle	
1950 (3rd)	Vincente Minnelli	Father's Little Dividend	
1950 (3rd)	Billy Wilder	Sunset Boulevard	
1951 (4th)	George Stevens	A Place in the Sun	
1951 (4th)	László Benedek	Death of a Salesman	
1951 (4th)	Michael Gordon	Cyrano de Bergerac	
1951 (4th)	Alfred Hitchcock	Strangers on a Train	
1951 (4th)	Elia Kazan	A Streetcar Named Desire	
1951 (4th)	Henry King	David and Bathsheba	
1951 (4th)	Mervyn LeRoy	Quo Vadis	
1951 (4th)	Anatole Litvak	Decision Before Dawn	
1951 (4th)	Vincente Minnelli	An American in Paris	
1951 (4th)	George Sidney	Show Boat	
1951 (4th)	Richard Thorpe	The Great Caruso	
1951 (4th)	William Wyler	Detective Story	
1952 (5th)	John Ford	The Quiet Man	
1952 (5th)	Charles Crichton	The Lavender Hill Mob	
1952 (5th)	George Cukor	Pat and Mike	
1952 (5th)	Michael Curtiz	I'll See You in My Dreams	
1952 (5th)	Cecil B. DeMille	The Greatest Show on Earth	
1952 (5th)	Hugo Fregonese	My Six Convicts	
1952 (5th)	Howard Hawks	The Big Sky	
1952 (5th)	Elia Kazan	Viva Zapata!	
1952 (5th)	Gene Kelly and Stanley Donen	Singin' in the Rain	
1952 (5th)	Henry King	The Snows of Kilimanjaro	
1952 (5th)	Akira Kurosawa	Rashomon	
1952 (5th)	Albert Lewin	Pandora and the Flying Dutchman	
1952 (5th)	Joseph L. Mankiewicz	5 Fingers	
1952 (5th)	Vincente Minnelli	The Bad and the Beautiful	
1952 (5th)	George Sidney	Scaramouche	
1952 (5th)	Richard Thorpe	Ivanhoe	
1952 (5th)	Charles Vidor	Hans Christian Andersen	
1952 (5th)	Fred Zinnemann	High Noon	
1953 (6th)	Fred Zinnemann	From Here to Eternity	
1953 (6th)	Melvin Frank and Norman Panama	Above and Beyond	
1953 (6th)	Henry Koster	The Robe	
1953 (6th)	Walter Lang	Call Me Madam	
1953 (6th)	Joseph L. Mankiewicz	Julius Caesar	
1953 (6th)	Daniel Mann	Come Back, Little Sheba	
1953 (6th)	Jean Negulesco	Titanic	
1953 (6th)	George Sidney	Young Bess	
1953 (6th)	George Stevens	Shane	
1953 (6th)	Charles Walters	Lili	
1953 (6th)	Billy Wilder	Stalag 17	
1953 (6th)	William Wyler	Roman Holiday	
1954 (7th)	Elia Kazan	On the Waterfront	
1954 (7th)	George Cukor	A Star Is Born	
1954 (7th)	Edward Dmytryk	The Caine Mutiny	
1954 (7th)	Stanley Donen	Seven Brides for Seven Brothers	
1954 (7th)	Melvin Frank and Norman Panama	Knock on Wood	
1954 (7th)	Samuel Fuller	Hell and High Water	
1954 (7th)	Alfred Hitchcock	Rear Window	
1954 (7th)	Henry King	King of the Khyber Rifles	
1954 (7th)	Anthony Mann	The Glenn Miller Story	
1954 (7th)	Jean Negulesco	Three Coins in the Fountain	
1954 (7th)	George Seaton	The Country Girl	
1954 (7th)	Don Siegel	Riot in Cell Block 11	
1954 (7th)	William A. Wellman	The High and the Mighty	
1954 (7th)	Robert Wise	Executive Suite	
1954 (7th)	Billy Wilder	Sabrina	
1955 (8th)	Delbert Mann	Marty	
1955 (8th)	Richard Brooks	Blackboard Jungle	
1955 (8th)	John Ford	The Long Gray Line	
1955 (8th)	Elia Kazan	East of Eden	
1955 (8th)	Henry Koster	A Man Called Peter	
1955 (8th)	Joshua Logan	Picnic	
1955 (8th)	Daniel Mann	The Rose Tattoo	
1955 (8th)	Mark Robson	The Bridges at Toko-Ri	
1955 (8th)	John Sturges	Bad Day at Black Rock	
1955 (8th)	Charles Vidor	Love Me or Leave Me	
1955 (8th)	Billy Wilder	The Seven Year Itch	
1956 (9th)	George Stevens	Giant	
1956 (9th)	Michael Anderson	Around the World in 80 Days	
1956 (9th)	John Huston	Moby Dick	
1956 (9th)	Joshua Logan	Bus Stop	
1956 (9th)	Daniel Mann	Teahouse of the August Moon	
1956 (9th)	King Vidor	War and Peace	
1956 (9th)	Robert Wise	Somebody Up There Likes Me	
1956 (9th)	William Wyler	Friendly Persuasion	
1957 (10th)	David Lean	The Bridge on the River Kwai	
1957 (10th)	George Cukor	Les Girls	
1957 (10th)	Stanley Donen	Funny Face	
1957 (10th)	José Ferrer	The Great Man	
1957 (10th)	John Huston	Heaven Knows, Mr. Allison	
1957 (10th)	Elia Kazan	A Face in the Crowd	
1957 (10th)	Stanley Kramer	The Pride and the Passion	
1957 (10th)	Anthony Mann	Men in War	
1957 (10th)	Leo McCarey	An Affair to Remember	
1957 (10th)	Robert Mulligan	Fear Strikes Out	
1957 (10th)	John Sturges	Gunfight at the O.K. Corral	
1957 (10th)	Fred Zinnemann	A Hatful of Rain	
1958 (11th)	Vincente Minnelli	Gigi	
1958 (11th)	George Abbott and Stanley Donen	Damn Yankees	
1958 (11th)	Richard Brooks	The Brothers Karamazov	
1958 (11th)	Delmer Daves	Cowboy	
1958 (11th)	Edward Dmytryk	The Young Lions	
1958 (11th)	Richard Fleischer	The Vikings	
1958 (11th)	Alfred Hitchcock	Vertigo	
1958 (11th)	Martin Ritt	The Long, Hot Summer	
1958 (11th)	George Seaton	Teacher's Pet	
1958 (11th)	William Wyler	The Big Country	
1959 (12th)	William Wyler	Ben-Hur	
1959 (12th)	Charles Barton	The Shaggy Dog	
1959 (12th)	Frank Capra	A Hole in the Head	
1959 (12th)	Richard Fleischer	Compulsion	
1959 (12th)	John Ford	The Horse Soldiers	
1959 (12th)	Howard Hawks	Rio Bravo	
1959 (12th)	Alfred Hitchcock	North by Northwest	
1959 (12th)	Leo McCarey	Rally Round the Flag, Boys!	
1959 (12th)	Otto Preminger	Anatomy of a Murder	
1959 (12th)	Douglas Sirk	Imitation of Life	
1959 (12th)	George Stevens	The Diary of Anne Frank	
1959 (12th)	Billy Wilder	Some Like It Hot	
1959 (12th)	Fred Zinnemann	The Nun's Story	

=== 1960s ===
Year	Winners and nominees	Film	Ref.
1960 (13th)	Billy Wilder	The Apartment	
1960 (13th)	Richard Brooks	Elmer Gantry	
1960 (13th)	Vincent J. Donehue	Sunrise at Campobello	
1960 (13th)	Lewis Gilbert	Sink the Bismarck!	
1960 (13th)	Walter Lang	Can-Can	
1960 (13th)	Delbert Mann	The Dark at the Top of the Stairs	
1960 (13th)	Carol Reed	Our Man in Havana	
1960 (13th)	Alain Resnais	Hiroshima mon amour	
1960 (13th)	Charles Walters	Please Don't Eat the Daisies	
1960 (13th)	Alfred Hitchcock	Psycho	
1961 (14th)	Robert Wise and Jerome Robbins	West Side Story	
1961 (14th)	Marlon Brando	One-Eyed Jacks	
1961 (14th)	Frank Capra	Pocketful of Miracles	
1961 (14th)	Jack Clayton	The Innocents	
1961 (14th)	Peter Glenville	Summer and Smoke	
1961 (14th)	John Huston	The Misfits	
1961 (14th)	Elia Kazan	Splendor in the Grass	
1961 (14th)	Henry Koster	Flower Drum Song	
1961 (14th)	Stanley Kramer	Judgment at Nuremberg	
1961 (14th)	Philip Leacock	Hand in Hand	
1961 (14th)	Mervyn LeRoy	A Majority of One	
1961 (14th)	Joshua Logan	Fanny	
1961 (14th)	Anthony Mann	El Cid	
1961 (14th)	Robert Mulligan	The Great Impostor	
1961 (14th)	Daniel Petrie	A Raisin in the Sun	
1961 (14th)	Robert Stevenson	The Absent-Minded Professor	
1961 (14th)	Peter Ustinov	Romanoff and Juliet	
1961 (14th)	William Wyler	The Children's Hour	
1962 (15th)	David Lean	Lawrence of Arabia	
1962 (15th)	Robert Aldrich	What Ever Happened to Baby Jane?	
1962 (15th)	Morton DaCosta	The Music Man	
1962 (15th)	Stanley Kubrick	Lolita	
1962 (15th)	Lewis Milestone	Mutiny on the Bounty	
1962 (15th)	Robert Mulligan	To Kill a Mockingbird	
1962 (15th)	Ralph Nelson	Requiem for a Heavyweight	
1962 (15th)	Arthur Penn	The Miracle Worker	
1962 (15th)	Tony Richardson	A Taste of Honey	
1963 (16th)	Tony Richardson	Tom Jones	
1963 (16th)	Federico Fellini	8½	
1963 (16th)	Elia Kazan	America America	
1963 (16th)	Ralph Nelson	Lilies of the Field	
1963 (16th)	Martin Ritt	Hud	
1964 (17th)	George Cukor	My Fair Lady	
1964 (17th)	Peter Glenville	Becket	
1964 (17th)	John Huston	The Night of the Iguana	
1964 (17th)	Stanley Kubrick	Dr. Strangelove	
1964 (17th)	Robert Stevenson	Mary Poppins	
1965 (18th)	Robert Wise	The Sound of Music	
1965 (18th)	Sidney J. Furie	The Ipcress File	
1965 (18th)	Sidney Lumet	The Pawnbroker	
1965 (18th)	John Schlesinger	Darling	
1965 (18th)	Elliot Silverstein	Cat Ballou	
1966 (19th)	Fred Zinnemann	A Man for All Seasons	
1966 (19th)	Richard Brooks	The Professionals	
1966 (19th)	John Frankenheimer	Grand Prix	
1966 (19th)	Lewis Gilbert	Alfie	
1966 (19th)	James Hill	Born Free	
1966 (19th)	Norman Jewison	The Russians Are Coming, the Russians Are Coming	
1966 (19th)	Claude Lelouch	A Man and a Woman	
1966 (19th)	Silvio Narizzano	Georgy Girl	
1966 (19th)	Mike Nichols	Who's Afraid of Virginia Woolf?	
1966 (19th)	Robert Wise	The Sand Pebbles	
1967 (20th)	Mike Nichols	The Graduate	
1967 (20th)	Robert Aldrich	The Dirty Dozen	
1967 (20th)	Richard Brooks	In Cold Blood	
1967 (20th)	James Clavell	To Sir, with Love	
1967 (20th)	Stanley Donen	Two for the Road	
1967 (20th)	Norman Jewison	In the Heat of the Night	
1967 (20th)	Stanley Kramer	Guess Who's Coming to Dinner	
1967 (20th)	Arthur Penn	Bonnie and Clyde	
1967 (20th)	Stuart Rosenberg	Cool Hand Luke	
1967 (20th)	Joseph Strick	Ulysses	
1968 (21st)	Anthony Harvey	The Lion in Winter	
1968 (21st)	Paul Almond	Isabel	
1968 (21st)	Stanley Kubrick	2001: A Space Odyssey	
1968 (21st)	Jiří Menzel	Closely Watched Trains	
1968 (21st)	Paul Newman	Rachel, Rachel	
1968 (21st)	Roman Polanski	Rosemary's Baby	
1968 (21st)	Carol Reed	Oliver!	
1968 (21st)	Gene Saks	The Odd Couple	
1968 (21st)	William Wyler	Funny Girl	
1968 (21st)	Franco Zeffirelli	Romeo and Juliet	
1969 (22nd)	John Schlesinger	Midnight Cowboy	
1969 (22nd)	Richard Attenborough	Oh! What a Lovely War	
1969 (22nd)	Costa-Gavras	Z	
1969 (22nd)	George Roy Hill	Butch Cassidy and the Sundance Kid	
1969 (22nd)	Dennis Hopper	Easy Rider	
1969 (22nd)	Gene Kelly	Hello, Dolly!	
1969 (22nd)	Sam Peckinpah	The Wild Bunch	
1969 (22nd)	Larry Peerce	Goodbye, Columbus	
1969 (22nd)	Sydney Pollack	They Shoot Horses, Don't They?	
1969 (22nd)	Haskell Wexler	Medium Cool	

=== 1970s ===
Year	Winners and nominees	Film	Ref.
1970 (23rd)	Franklin J. Schaffner	Patton	
1970 (23rd)	Robert Altman	M*A*S*H	
1970 (23rd)	Arthur Hiller	Love Story	
1970 (23rd)	David Lean	Ryan's Daughter	
1970 (23rd)	Bob Rafelson	Five Easy Pieces	
1971 (24th)	William Friedkin	The French Connection	
1971 (24th)	Peter Bogdanovich	The Last Picture Show	
1971 (24th)	Stanley Kubrick	A Clockwork Orange	
1971 (24th)	Robert Mulligan	Summer of '42	
1971 (24th)	John Schlesinger	Sunday Bloody Sunday	
1972 (25th)	Francis Ford Coppola	The Godfather	
1972 (25th)	John Boorman	Deliverance	
1972 (25th)	Bob Fosse	Cabaret	
1972 (25th)	George Roy Hill	Slaughterhouse-Five	
1972 (25th)	Martin Ritt	Sounder	
1973 (26th)	George Roy Hill	The Sting	
1973 (26th)	Bernardo Bertolucci	Last Tango in Paris	
1973 (26th)	William Friedkin	The Exorcist	
1973 (26th)	George Lucas	American Graffiti	
1973 (26th)	Sidney Lumet	Serpico	
1974 (27th)	Francis Ford Coppola	The Godfather Part II	
1974 (27th)	Francis Ford Coppola	The Conversation	
1974 (27th)	Bob Fosse	Lenny	
1974 (27th)	Sidney Lumet	Murder on the Orient Express	
1974 (27th)	Roman Polanski	Chinatown	
1975 (28th)	Miloš Forman	One Flew Over the Cuckoo's Nest	
1975 (28th)	Robert Altman	Nashville	
1975 (28th)	Stanley Kubrick	Barry Lyndon	
1975 (28th)	Sidney Lumet	Dog Day Afternoon	
1975 (28th)	Steven Spielberg	Jaws	
1976 (29th)	John G. Avildsen	Rocky	
1976 (29th)	Sidney Lumet	Network	
1976 (29th)	Alan J. Pakula	All the President's Men	
1976 (29th)	Martin Scorsese	Taxi Driver	
1976 (29th)	Lina Wertmüller	Seven Beauties	
1977 (30th)	Woody Allen	Annie Hall	
1977 (30th)	George Lucas	Star Wars	
1977 (30th)	Herbert Ross	The Turning Point	
1977 (30th)	Steven Spielberg	Close Encounters of the Third Kind	
1977 (30th)	Fred Zinnemann	Julia	
1978 (31st)	Michael Cimino	The Deer Hunter	
1978 (31st)	Hal Ashby	Coming Home	
1978 (31st)	Warren Beatty and Buck Henry	Heaven Can Wait	
1978 (31st)	Paul Mazursky	An Unmarried Woman	
1978 (31st)	Alan Parker	Midnight Express	
1979 (32nd)	Robert Benton	Kramer vs. Kramer	
1979 (32nd)	Woody Allen	Manhattan	
1979 (32nd)	James Bridges	The China Syndrome	
1979 (32nd)	Francis Ford Coppola	Apocalypse Now	
1979 (32nd)	Peter Yates	Breaking Away	

=== 1980s ===
Year	Winners and nominees	Film	Ref.
1980 (33rd)	Robert Redford	Ordinary People	
1980 (33rd)	Michael Apted	Coal Miner's Daughter	
1980 (33rd)	David Lynch	The Elephant Man	
1980 (33rd)	Richard Rush	The Stunt Man	
1980 (33rd)	Martin Scorsese	Raging Bull	
1981 (34th)	Warren Beatty	Reds	
1981 (34th)	Hugh Hudson	Chariots of Fire	
1981 (34th)	Louis Malle	Atlantic City	
1981 (34th)	Mark Rydell	On Golden Pond	
1981 (34th)	Steven Spielberg	Raiders of the Lost Ark	
1982 (35th)	Richard Attenborough	Gandhi	
1982 (35th)	Taylor Hackford	An Officer and a Gentleman	
1982 (35th)	Wolfgang Petersen	Das Boot	
1982 (35th)	Sydney Pollack	Tootsie	
1982 (35th)	Steven Spielberg	E.T. the Extra-Terrestrial	
1983 (36th)	James L. Brooks	Terms of Endearment	
1983 (36th)	Bruce Beresford	Tender Mercies	
1983 (36th)	Ingmar Bergman	Fanny and Alexander	
1983 (36th)	Lawrence Kasdan	The Big Chill	
1983 (36th)	Philip Kaufman	The Right Stuff	
1984 (37th)	Miloš Forman	Amadeus	
1984 (37th)	Robert Benton	Places in the Heart	
1984 (37th)	Norman Jewison	A Soldier's Story	
1984 (37th)	Roland Joffé	The Killing Fields	
1984 (37th)	David Lean	A Passage to India	
1985 (38th)	Steven Spielberg	The Color Purple	
1985 (38th)	Ron Howard	Cocoon	
1985 (38th)	John Huston	Prizzi's Honor	
1985 (38th)	Sydney Pollack	Out of Africa	
1985 (38th)	Peter Weir	Witness	
1986 (39th)	Oliver Stone	Platoon	
1986 (39th)	Woody Allen	Hannah and Her Sisters	
1986 (39th)	Randa Haines	Children of a Lesser God	
1986 (39th)	James Ivory	A Room with a View	
1986 (39th)	Rob Reiner	Stand by Me	
1987 (40th)	Bernardo Bertolucci	The Last Emperor	
1987 (40th)	James L. Brooks	Broadcast News	
1987 (40th)	Lasse Hallström	My Life as a Dog	
1987 (40th)	Adrian Lyne	Fatal Attraction	
1987 (40th)	Steven Spielberg	Empire of the Sun	
1988 (41st)	Barry Levinson	Rain Man	
1988 (41st)	Charles Crichton	A Fish Called Wanda	
1988 (41st)	Mike Nichols	Working Girl	
1988 (41st)	Alan Parker	Mississippi Burning	
1988 (41st)	Robert Zemeckis	Who Framed Roger Rabbit	
1989 (42nd)	Oliver Stone	Born on the Fourth of July	
1989 (42nd)	Woody Allen	Crimes and Misdemeanors	
1989 (42nd)	Rob Reiner	When Harry Met Sally...	
1989 (42nd)	Phil Alden Robinson	Field of Dreams	
1989 (42nd)	Peter Weir	Dead Poets Society	

=== 1990s ===
Year	Winners and nominees	Film	Ref.
1990 (43rd)	Kevin Costner	Dances with Wolves	
1990 (43rd)	Francis Ford Coppola	The Godfather Part III	
1990 (43rd)	Barry Levinson	Avalon	
1990 (43rd)	Martin Scorsese	Goodfellas	
1990 (43rd)	Giuseppe Tornatore	Cinema Paradiso	
1991 (44th)	Jonathan Demme	The Silence of the Lambs	
1991 (44th)	Barry Levinson	Bugsy	
1991 (44th)	Ridley Scott	Thelma and Louise	
1991 (44th)	Oliver Stone	JFK	
1991 (44th)	Barbra Streisand	The Prince of Tides	
1992 (45th)	Clint Eastwood	Unforgiven	
1992 (45th)	Robert Altman	The Player	
1992 (45th)	James Ivory	Howards End	
1992 (45th)	Neil Jordan	The Crying Game	
1992 (45th)	Rob Reiner	A Few Good Men	
1993 (46th)	Steven Spielberg	Schindler's List	
1993 (46th)	Jane Campion	The Piano	
1993 (46th)	Andrew Davis	The Fugitive	
1993 (46th)	James Ivory	The Remains of the Day	
1993 (46th)	Martin Scorsese	The Age of Innocence	
1994 (47th)	Robert Zemeckis	Forrest Gump	
1994 (47th)	Frank Darabont	The Shawshank Redemption	
1994 (47th)	Mike Newell	Four Weddings and a Funeral	
1994 (47th)	Robert Redford	Quiz Show	
1994 (47th)	Quentin Tarantino	Pulp Fiction	
1995 (48th)	Ron Howard	Apollo 13	
1995 (48th)	Mike Figgis	Leaving Las Vegas	
1995 (48th)	Mel Gibson	Braveheart	
1995 (48th)	Ang Lee	Sense and Sensibility	
1995 (48th)	Michael Radford	Il Postino: The Postman	
1996 (49th)	Anthony Minghella	The English Patient	
1996 (49th)	Joel Coen	Fargo	
1996 (49th)	Cameron Crowe	Jerry Maguire	
1996 (49th)	Scott Hicks	Shine	
1996 (49th)	Mike Leigh	Secrets and Lies	
1997 (50th)	James Cameron	Titanic	
1997 (50th)	James L. Brooks	As Good as It Gets	
1997 (50th)	Curtis Hanson	L.A. Confidential	
1997 (50th)	Steven Spielberg	Amistad	
1997 (50th)	Gus Van Sant	Good Will Hunting	
1998 (51st)	Steven Spielberg	Saving Private Ryan	
1998 (51st)	Roberto Benigni	Life Is Beautiful	
1998 (51st)	John Madden	Shakespeare in Love	
1998 (51st)	Terrence Malick	The Thin Red Line	
1998 (51st)	Peter Weir	The Truman Show	
1999 (52nd)	Sam Mendes	American Beauty	
1999 (52nd)	Frank Darabont	The Green Mile	
1999 (52nd)	Spike Jonze	Being John Malkovich	
1999 (52nd)	Michael Mann	The Insider	
1999 (52nd)	M. Night Shyamalan	The Sixth Sense	

=== 2000s ===
Year	Winners and nominees	Film	Ref.
2000 (53rd)	Ang Lee	Crouching Tiger, Hidden Dragon	
2000 (53rd)	Cameron Crowe	Almost Famous	
2000 (53rd)	Ridley Scott	Gladiator	
2000 (53rd)	Steven Soderbergh	Erin Brockovich	
2000 (53rd)	Steven Soderbergh	Traffic	
2001 (54th)	Ron Howard	A Beautiful Mind	
2001 (54th)	Peter Jackson	The Lord of the Rings: The Fellowship of the Ring	
2001 (54th)	Baz Luhrmann	Moulin Rouge!	
2001 (54th)	Christopher Nolan	Memento	
2001 (54th)	Ridley Scott	Black Hawk Down	
2002 (55th)	Rob Marshall	Chicago	
2002 (55th)	Stephen Daldry	The Hours	
2002 (55th)	Peter Jackson	The Lord of the Rings: The Two Towers	
2002 (55th)	Roman Polanski	The Pianist	
2002 (55th)	Martin Scorsese	Gangs of New York	
2003 (56th)	Peter Jackson	The Lord of the Rings: The Return of the King	
2003 (56th)	Sofia Coppola	Lost in Translation	
2003 (56th)	Clint Eastwood	Mystic River	
2003 (56th)	Gary Ross	Seabiscuit	
2003 (56th)	Peter Weir	Master and Commander: The Far Side of the World	
2004 (57th)	Clint Eastwood	Million Dollar Baby	
2004 (57th)	Marc Forster	Finding Neverland	
2004 (57th)	Taylor Hackford	Ray	
2004 (57th)	Alexander Payne	Sideways	
2004 (57th)	Martin Scorsese	The Aviator	
2005 (58th)	Ang Lee	Brokeback Mountain	
2005 (58th)	George Clooney	Good Night, and Good Luck	
2005 (58th)	Paul Haggis	Crash	
2005 (58th)	Bennett Miller	Capote	
2005 (58th)	Steven Spielberg	Munich	
2006 (59th)	Martin Scorsese	The Departed	
2006 (59th)	Bill Condon	Dreamgirls	
2006 (59th)	Jonathan Dayton and Valerie Faris	Little Miss Sunshine	
2006 (59th)	Stephen Frears	The Queen	
2006 (59th)	Alejandro González Iñárritu	Babel	
2007 (60th)	Joel Coen and Ethan Coen	No Country for Old Men	
2007 (60th)	Paul Thomas Anderson	There Will Be Blood	
2007 (60th)	Tony Gilroy	Michael Clayton	
2007 (60th)	Sean Penn	Into the Wild	
2007 (60th)	Julian Schnabel	The Diving Bell and the Butterfly	
2008 (61st)	Danny Boyle	Slumdog Millionaire	
2008 (61st)	David Fincher	The Curious Case of Benjamin Button	
2008 (61st)	Ron Howard	Frost/Nixon	
2008 (61st)	Christopher Nolan	The Dark Knight	
2008 (61st)	Gus Van Sant	Milk	
2009 (62nd)	Kathryn Bigelow	The Hurt Locker	
2009 (62nd)	James Cameron	Avatar	
2009 (62nd)	Lee Daniels	Precious	
2009 (62nd)	Jason Reitman	Up in the Air	
2009 (62nd)	Quentin Tarantino	Inglourious Basterds	

=== 2010s ===
Year	Winners and nominees	Film	Ref.
2010 (63rd)	Tom Hooper	The King's Speech	
2010 (63rd)	Darren Aronofsky	Black Swan	
2010 (63rd)	David Fincher	The Social Network	
2010 (63rd)	Christopher Nolan	Inception	
2010 (63rd)	David O. Russell	The Fighter	
2011 (64th)	Michel Hazanavicius	The Artist	
2011 (64th)	Woody Allen	Midnight in Paris	
2011 (64th)	David Fincher	The Girl with the Dragon Tattoo	
2011 (64th)	Alexander Payne	The Descendants	
2011 (64th)	Martin Scorsese	Hugo	
2012 (65th)	Ben Affleck	Argo	
2012 (65th)	Kathryn Bigelow	Zero Dark Thirty	
2012 (65th)	Tom Hooper	Les Misérables	
2012 (65th)	Ang Lee	Life of Pi	
2012 (65th)	Steven Spielberg	Lincoln	
2013 (66th)	Alfonso Cuarón	Gravity	
2013 (66th)	Paul Greengrass	Captain Phillips	
2013 (66th)	Steve McQueen	12 Years a Slave	
2013 (66th)	David O. Russell	American Hustle	
2013 (66th)	Martin Scorsese	The Wolf of Wall Street	
2014 (67th)	Alejandro G. Iñárritu	Birdman	
2014 (67th)	Wes Anderson	The Grand Budapest Hotel	
2014 (67th)	Clint Eastwood	American Sniper	
2014 (67th)	Richard Linklater	Boyhood	
2014 (67th)	Morten Tyldum	The Imitation Game	
2015 (68th)	Alejandro G. Iñárritu	The Revenant	
2015 (68th)	Tom McCarthy	Spotlight	
2015 (68th)	Adam McKay	The Big Short	
2015 (68th)	George Miller	Mad Max: Fury Road	
2015 (68th)	Ridley Scott	The Martian	
2016 (69th)	Damien Chazelle	La La Land	
2016 (69th)	Garth Davis	Lion	
2016 (69th)	Barry Jenkins	Moonlight	
2016 (69th)	Kenneth Lonergan	Manchester by the Sea	
2016 (69th)	Denis Villeneuve	Arrival	
2017 (70th)	Guillermo del Toro	The Shape of Water	
2017 (70th)	Greta Gerwig	Lady Bird	
2017 (70th)	Martin McDonagh	Three Billboards Outside Ebbing, Missouri	
2017 (70th)	Christopher Nolan	Dunkirk	
2017 (70th)	Jordan Peele	Get Out	
2018 (71st)	Alfonso Cuarón	Roma	
2018 (71st)	Bradley Cooper	A Star Is Born	
2018 (71st)	Peter Farrelly	Green Book	
2018 (71st)	Spike Lee	BlacKkKlansman	
2018 (71st)	Adam McKay	Vice	
2019 (72nd)	Sam Mendes	1917	
2019 (72nd)	Bong Joon-ho	Parasite	
2019 (72nd)	Martin Scorsese	The Irishman	
2019 (72nd)	Quentin Tarantino	Once Upon a Time in Hollywood	
2019 (72nd)	Taika Waititi	Jojo Rabbit	

=== 2020s ===
Year	Winners and nominees	Film	Ref.
2020 (73rd)	Chloé Zhao	Nomadland	
2020 (73rd)	Lee Isaac Chung	Minari	
2020 (73rd)	Emerald Fennell	Promising Young Woman	
2020 (73rd)	David Fincher	Mank	
2020 (73rd)	Aaron Sorkin	The Trial of the Chicago 7	
2021 (74th)	Jane Campion	The Power of the Dog	
2021 (74th)	Paul Thomas Anderson	Licorice Pizza	
2021 (74th)	Kenneth Branagh	Belfast	
2021 (74th)	Steven Spielberg	West Side Story	
2021 (74th)	Denis Villeneuve	Dune	
2022 (75th)	Daniel Kwan and Daniel Scheinert	Everything Everywhere All at Once	
2022 (75th)	Todd Field	Tár	
2022 (75th)	Joseph Kosinski	Top Gun: Maverick	
2022 (75th)	Martin McDonagh	The Banshees of Inisherin	
2022 (75th)	Steven Spielberg	The Fabelmans	
2023 (76th)	Christopher Nolan	Oppenheimer	
2023 (76th)	Greta Gerwig	Barbie	
2023 (76th)	Yorgos Lanthimos	Poor Things	
2023 (76th)	Alexander Payne	The Holdovers	
2023 (76th)	Martin Scorsese	Killers of the Flower Moon	
2024 (77th)	Sean Baker	Anora	
2024 (77th)	Jacques Audiard	Emilia Pérez	
2024 (77th)	Edward Berger	Conclave	
2024 (77th)	Brady Corbet	The Brutalist	
2024 (77th)	James Mangold	A Complete Unknown	
2025 (78th)	Paul Thomas Anderson	One Battle After Another	
2025 (78th)	Ryan Coogler	Sinners	
2025 (78th)	Guillermo del Toro	Frankenstein	
2025 (78th)	Josh Safdie	Marty Supreme	
2025 (78th)	Chloé Zhao	Hamnet	

== Directors with multiple wins ==
=== 3 wins ===
- Steven Spielberg

=== 2 wins ===
- Francis Ford Coppola
- Alfonso Cuarón
- Clint Eastwood
- Miloš Forman
- Ron Howard
- Alejandro González Iñárritu (consecutive)
- David Lean
- Ang Lee
- Joseph L. Mankiewicz
- Sam Mendes
- George Stevens
- Oliver Stone
- Robert Wise
- Fred Zinnemann

== Directors with multiple nominations ==
The following directors have received four or more nominations:

13 nominations

- Steven Spielberg

11 nominations

- Martin Scorsese

7 nominations

- Elia Kazan
- William Wyler
- Fred Zinnemann

6 nominations

- John Huston
- Billy Wilder

5 nominations

- Woody Allen
- Richard Brooks
- Francis Ford Coppola
- Stanley Donen
- Alfred Hitchcock
- Stanley Kubrick
- Sidney Lumet
- Christopher Nolan
- Robert Wise

4 nominations

- George Cukor
- Clint Eastwood
- David Fincher
- Ron Howard
- David Lean
- Ang Lee
- Joseph L. Mankiewicz
- Vincente Minnelli
- Robert Mulligan
- Ridley Scott
- George Stevens
- Peter Weir

== See also ==
- Academy Award for Best Director
- BAFTA Award for Best Direction
- Cannes Film Festival Award for Best Director
- Critics' Choice Movie Award for Best Director
- Golden Globe Award for Best Director
- Independent Spirit Award for Best Director
- Producers Guild of America Award for Best Theatrical Motion Picture
- Silver Bear for Best Director
- Silver Lion for Best Direction
