= Directors Guild of America Award for Outstanding Directorial Achievement in Daytime Serials =

Award for television directing (1991–2012)

- Awarded for: Outstanding Directorial Achievement in Daytime Serials
- Country: United States
- Presented by: Directors Guild of America
- First award: 1991
- Final award: 2012
- Website: www.dga.org

The Directors Guild of America Award for Outstanding Directorial Achievement in Daytime Serials is an annual award that was given by the Directors Guild of America between 1991 and 2012. In 2013, the category was merged into the award for Outstanding Directorial Achievement in Dramatic Series.

== Winners and nominees ==
=== 1990s ===
Year	Program	Episode	Winners and nominees	Network	Ref.
1991 (44th)	The Bold and the Beautiful	"Episode #1,103"	Michael Stich	CBS	
1991 (44th)	The Young and the Restless	"Episode #4,708"	Mike Denney	CBS	
1991 (44th)	The Young and the Restless	"Episode #4,730"	Heather Hill	CBS	
1992 (45th)	Another World	"Episode #7,022"	Susan Strickler	NBC	
1992 (45th)	Days of Our Lives	"Episode #6,888"	Kenneth Herman Jr.	NBC	
1992 (45th)	The Young and the Restless	"Episode #4,825"	Frank Pacelli	CBS	
1993 (46th)	One Life to Live	"Episode #6,356"	Jill Mitwell	ABC	
1993 (46th)	The Bold and the Beautiful	"Episode #1,693"	Michael Stich	CBS	
1993 (46th)	General Hospital	"Episode #7,819"	Joseph Behar	ABC	
1993 (46th)	Guiding Light	"Episode #11,644"	Bruce S. Barry	CBS	
1993 (46th)	Guiding Light	"Episode #11,563"	Brian Mertes	CBS	
1994 (47th)	The Bold and the Beautiful	"Episode #1,884"	Michael Stich	CBS	
1994 (47th)	The Bold and the Beautiful	"Episode #1,756"	John C. Zak	CBS	
1994 (47th)	General Hospital	"Episode #7,922"	Shelley Curtis	ABC	
1994 (47th)	The Young and the Restless	"Episode #5,370"	Jerry Evans	CBS	
1994 (47th)	The Young and the Restless	"Episode #5,476"	Heather Hill	CBS	
1995 (48th)	General Hospital	"Episode #8,248"	William Ludel and Alan Pultz	ABC	
1995 (48th)	The Bold and the Beautiful	"Episode #2,167"	Susan Flannery	ABC	
1995 (48th)	General Hospital	"Episode #8,183"	Joseph Behar	ABC	
1995 (48th)	General Hospital	"Episode #8,233"	Scott McKinsey and Shelley Curtis	ABC	
1995 (48th)	Guiding Light	"Episode #12,063"	Bruce S. Barry	CBS	
1996 (49th)	The Young and the Restless	"Episode #5,875"	Kathryn Foster and Mike Denney	CBS	
1996 (49th)	The Bold and the Beautiful	"Episode #2,393"	Michael Stich	CBS	
1996 (49th)	General Hospital	"Episode #8,492"	Scott McKinsey	ABC	
1996 (49th)	Guiding Light	"Episode #12,451"	Bruce S. Barry	CBS	
1996 (49th)	One Life to Live	"Episode #7,285"	Jill Mitwell	ABC	
1997 (50th)	General Hospital	"Episode #8,883"	Scott McKinsey	ABC	
1997 (50th)	As the World Turns	"Episode #10,446"	Christopher Goutman, Charles C. Dyer, and Maria Wagner	CBS	
1997 (50th)	The Bold and the Beautiful	"Episode #2,580"	Susan Flannery	CBS	
1997 (50th)	The Bold and the Beautiful	"Episode #2,681"	Deveney Kelly	CBS	
1997 (50th)	The Young and the Restless	"Episode #6,032"	Frank Pacelli	CBS	
1998 (51st)	One Life to Live	"Episode #7,572"	James Sayegh	ABC	
1998 (51st)	The Bold and the Beautiful	"Episode #2,942"	Nancy Eckels	CBS	
1998 (51st)	General Hospital	"Episode #2,580"	Joseph Behar	ABC	
1998 (51st)	One Life to Live	"Episode #7,761"	Jill Mitwell	ABC	
1998 (51st)	The Young and the Restless	"Episode #6,437"	Sally McDonald	CBS	
1999 (52nd)	Days of Our Lives	"Episode #8,557"	Herbert Stein	NBC	
1999 (52nd)	One Life to Live	"Episode #8,012"	Jill Mitwell	ABC	
1999 (52nd)	Port Charles	"Episode #619"	Albert Alarr	ABC	
1999 (52nd)	The Young and the Restless	"Episode #6,787"	Kathryn Foster	CBS	
1999 (52nd)	The Young and the Restless	"Episode #6,632"	Noel Maxam	CBS	

=== 2000s ===
Year	Program	Episode	Winners and nominees	Network	Ref.
2000 (53rd)	One Life to Live	"Episode #8,205"	Jill Mitwell	ABC	
2000 (53rd)	All My Children	"Episode #7,919"	Casey Childs	ABC	
2000 (53rd)	All My Children	"Episode #7,969"	Conal O'Brien	ABC	
2000 (53rd)	Guiding Light	"Episode #13,562"	Bruce S. Barry	CBS	
2000 (53rd)	Guiding Light	"Episode #13,511"	JoAnne Sedwick	CBS	
2001 (54th)	General Hospital	"Episode #9,801"	William Ludel	ABC	
2001 (54th)	All My Children	"Episode #8,186"	Angela Tessinari	ABC	
2001 (54th)	The Bold and the Beautiful	"Episode #3,532"	Michael Stich	CBS	
2001 (54th)	Days of Our Lives	"Episode #8,991"	Randy Robbins	NBC	
2001 (54th)	One Life to Live	"Episode #8,437"	Gary Tomlin	ABC	
2002 (55th)	Port Charles	"Episode #1,433"	Scott McKinsey	ABC	
2002 (55th)	The Bold and the Beautiful	"Episode #3,948"	Michael Stich	CBS	
2002 (55th)	One Life to Live	"Episode #8,655"	Larry Carpenter	ABC	
2002 (55th)	One Life to Live	"Episode #8,691"	Jill Mitwell	ABC	
2002 (55th)	One Life to Live	"Episode #8,656"	Frank Valentini	ABC	
2003 (56th)	One Life to Live	"Episode #8,849"	Larry Carpenter	ABC	
2003 (56th)	All My Children	"Episode #8,722"	Angela Tessinari	ABC	
2003 (56th)	Guiding Light	"Episode #14,279"	Susan Strickler	CBS	
2003 (56th)	Port Charles	"Episode #1,561"	Andrew Lee and Jeff Rabin	ABC	
2003 (56th)	The Young and the Restless	"Episode #7,784"	Sally McDonald	CBS	
2004 (57th)	Guiding Light	"Episode #14,321"	Bruce S. Barry	CBS	
2004 (57th)	All My Children	"Episode #8,768"	Conal O'Brien	ABC	
2004 (57th)	As the World Turns	"Episode #12,166"	Christopher Goutman	CBS	
2004 (57th)	General Hospital	"Episode #10,461"	Joseph Behar	ABC	
2004 (57th)	Guiding Light	"Episode #14,322"	Matt Lagle and Brian Mertes	CBS	
2005 (58th)	General Hospital	"Episode #10,914"	Owen Renfroe	ABC	
2005 (58th)	The Bold and the Beautiful	"Episode #4,623"	Michael Stich	CBS	
2005 (58th)	Days of Our Lives	"Episode #10,090"	Herbert Stein and Albert Alarr	NBC	
2005 (58th)	Guiding Light	"Episode #14,696"	Ellen Wheeler	CBS	
2005 (58th)	One Life to Live	"Episode #9,385"	Larry Carpenter	ABC	
2006 (59th)	One Life to Live	"Episode #9,779"	Jill Mitwell	ABC	
2006 (59th)	All My Children	"Episode #9,297"	Casey Childs	ABC	
2006 (59th)	General Hospital	"Episode #11,177"	William Ludel	ABC	
2006 (59th)	General Hospital	"Episode #11,178"	Scott McKinsey	ABC	
2006 (59th)	Guiding Light	"Episode #14,905"	Brian Mertes	CBS	
2006 (59th)	Guiding Light	"Episode #14,832"	Ellen Wheeler	CBS	
2006 (59th)	One Life to Live	"Episode #9,686"	Larry Carpenter	ABC	
2007 (60th)	One Life to Live	"Episode #9,947"	Larry Carpenter	ABC	
2007 (60th)	All My Children	"Episode #9,669"	Casey Childs	ABC	
2007 (60th)	As the World Turns	"Episode #12,971"	Christopher Goutman	CBS	
2007 (60th)	General Hospital	"Episode #11,228"	Scott McKinsey	ABC	
2007 (60th)	Guiding Light	"Episode #15,221"	Ellen Wheeler	CBS	
2008 (61st)	One Life to Live	"So You Think You Can Be Shane Morasco's Father?"	Larry Carpenter	ABC	
2008 (61st)	Days of Our Lives	"This Is It"	Noel Maxam	NBC	
2008 (61st)	Days of Our Lives	"Airplane Crash Aftermath"	Herbert Stein	NBC	
2008 (61st)	General Hospital	"Luke in Purgatory"	William Ludel	ABC	
2008 (61st)	General Hospital	"Catch Me If You Can"	Owen Renfroe	ABC	
2009 (62nd)	As The World Turns	"Once Upon a Time"	Christopher Goutman	CBS	
2009 (62nd)	The Bold and the Beautiful	"Fashion Challenge Sabotage"	Cynthia J. Popp	CBS	
2009 (62nd)	General Hospital	"Macho Men"	William Ludel	ABC	
2009 (62nd)	The Young and the Restless	"Billy's New Year's Eve Revelation"	Dean LaMont	CBS	
2009 (62nd)	The Young and the Restless	"Six Minutes and Counting"	Sally McDonald	CBS	

=== 2010s ===
Year	Program	Episode	Winners and nominees	Network	Ref.
2010 (63rd)	One Life to Live	"Starr X'd Lovers, The Musical, Part Two"	Larry Carpenter	ABC	
2010 (63rd)	The Bold and the Beautiful	"A Reason to Live – Part 1"	Michael Stich	CBS	
2010 (63rd)	General Hospital	"Francophrenia"	Owen Renfroe	ABC	
2010 (63rd)	One Life to Live	"Starr X'd Lovers, The Musical, Part Three"	Jill Mitwell	ABC	
2010 (63rd)	The Young and the Restless	"Ebenezer Newman"	Sally McDonald	CBS	
2011 (64th)	General Hospital	"Intervention"	William Ludel	ABC	
2011 (64th)	All My Children	"The Send Off"	Casey Childs	ABC	
2011 (64th)	All My Children	"In the Wee Small Hours..."	Angela Tessinari	ABC	
2011 (64th)	The Bold and the Beautiful	"Brooke Berry"	Cynthia J. Popp	CBS	
2011 (64th)	General Hospital	"Forces of Nature"	Scott McKinsey	ABC	
2011 (64th)	One Life to Live	"Erika's 40th"	Larry Carpenter	ABC	
2011 (64th)	The Young and the Restless	"From the Grave"	Mike Denney	CBS	
2012 (65th)	One Life to Live	"Between Heaven and Hell"	Jill Mitwell	ABC	
2012 (65th)	Days of Our Lives	"Trapped"	Albert Alarr	NBC	
2012 (65th)	General Hospital	"Bad Water"	Larry Carpenter	ABC	
2012 (65th)	General Hospital	"Magic Milo"	William Ludel	ABC	
2012 (65th)	General Hospital	"Shot Through The Heart"	Scott McKinsey	ABC	

== Programs with multiple awards ==
9 awards

- One Life to Live

5 awards

- General Hospital

2 awards

- The Bold and the Beautiful

== Programs with multiple nominations ==
23 nominations

- General Hospital

20 nominations

- One Life to Live

15 nominations

- The Bold and the Beautiful
- The Young and the Restless

13 nominations

- Guiding Light

9 nominations

- All My Children

7 nominations

- Days of Our Lives

4 nominations

- As the World Turns

3 nominations

- Port Charles

== Individuals with multiple awards ==
4 awards

- Larry Carpenter (2 consecutive)
- Jill Mitwell

3 awards

- William Ludel

2 awards

- Scott McKinsey
- Michael Stich

== Individuals with multiple nominations ==
9 nominations

- Larry Carpenter
- Jill Mitwell

8 nominations

- Scott McKinsey
- Michael Stich

7 nominations

- William Ludel

5 nominations

- Bruce S. Barry

4 nominations

- Joseph Behar
- Casey Childs
- Christopher Goutman
- Sally McDonald

3 nominations

- Albert Alarr
- Brian Mertes
- Mike Denney
- Owen Renfroe
- Herbert Stein
- Angela Tessinari
- Ellen Wheeler

2 nominations

- Shelley Curtis
- Susan Flannery
- Kathryn Foster
- Heather Hill
- Noel Maxam
- Conal O'Brien
- Frank Pacelli
- Cynthia J. Popp
- Susan Strickler

== Total awards by network ==
- ABC – 15
- CBS – 5
- NBC – 2
