= Franklin J. Schaffner Achievement Award =

The Franklin J. Schaffner Achievement Award is an American film award established by the Directors Guild of America (DGA), given to an associate director or Stage Manager in recognition of their service to the industry and the Guild.

Named after the American director Franklin J. Schaffner, it was first awarded at the 43rd Directors Guild of America Awards in 1991.

== Recipients ==
Year	Recipient(s)	Ref.
1990	Chester O'Brien and Mortimer O'Brien	
1991	Marilyn Jacobs-Furey	
1992	James "Woody" Woodworth	
1993	James Wall	
1994	Larry Carl	
1995	Don Lewis Barnhart	
1996	Joseph L. Dicso	
1997	C.J. Rapp Pittman	
1998	Robert Caminiti	
1999	Scott L. Rindenow	
2000	Robert N. Van Ry	
2001	Anita Cooper-Avrick	
2002	Esperanza Martinez	
2003	Peery Forbis	
2004	Stanley Faer	
2005	Donald E. Jacob	
2006	Terry Benson	
2007	Barbara J. Roche	
2008	Scott Berger	
2009	Maria Jimenez Henley	
2010	No award	
2011	Dennis W. Mazzocco	
2012	Dency Nelson	
2013	Vince DeDario	
2014	Julie E. Gelfand	
2015	Tom McDermott	
2016	No award	
2017	Jim Tanker	
2018	Mimi Deaton	
2019	Arthur E. Lewis	
2020	Joyce Thomas	
2021	Garry W. Hood	
2022	Valdez Flagg	
2023	Gary Natoli	
2024	No award	
2025	David Charles	
