= Daytime Emmy Award for Outstanding Drama Series Directing Team =

Annual television award

- Awarded for: Outstanding Drama Series Directing Team
- Country: United States
- Presented by: NATAS; ATAS
- First award: 1974
- Currently held by: Days of Our Lives (2026)

Highlights
- Most awards: General Hospital (15)
- Most nominations: The Young and the Restless (27)
- Website: emmyonline.org/daytime

The Daytime Emmy Award for Outstanding Drama Series Directing Team is an award presented annually by the National Academy of Television Arts and Sciences (NATAS) and Academy of Television Arts & Sciences (ATAS).

It was first awarded at the 1st Daytime Emmy Awards ceremony, held in 1974 when the award was originally called Outstanding Individual Director for a Drama Series. Therefore, between 1974 and 1978; the award only honored individual directors. In 1979, the award was renamed Outstanding Direction for a Drama Series before using its current title years later. Since then, the award has honored the performances of the entire directing team participating in a form of a daytime drama. The awards ceremony was not aired on television in 1983 and 1984, having been criticized for lack of integrity.

Richard Dunlap has received the most wins for his direction on The Young and the Restless, with a total of two. General Hospital holds the record for the most awards, winning on fifteen occasions. The Bold and the Beautiful tied in 2011 with The Young and the Restless, which was the first tie in this category. The soap opera has also received the most nominations, with a total of twenty-seven. CBS has been the network the most successful, with a total of nineteen wins. As of the 2025 ceremony, General Hospital is the most recent recipient of the award.

== Winners and nominees ==
Listed below are the winners of the award for each year, as well as the other nominees.

Table key
‡	Indicates the winner

=== Outstanding Individual Director for a Drama Series ===
==== 1970s ====
Year	Director(s)	Program	Network	Ref
1974 (1st)	Wes Kenney ‡	Days of Our Lives	NBC	
1974 (1st)	Norman Hall	The Doctors	NBC	
1974 (1st)	Hugh McPhillips	The Doctors	NBC	
1975 (2nd)	Richard Dunlap ‡	The Young and the Restless	CBS	
1975 (2nd)	Joseph Behar	Days of Our Lives	NBC	
1975 (2nd)	Ira Cirker	Another World	NBC	
1976 (3rd)	David Pressman ‡	One Life to Live	ABC	
1976 (3rd)	Hugh McPhillips	The Doctors	NBC	
1976 (3rd)	Richard Dunlap	The Young and the Restless	CBS	
1977 (4th)	Lela Swift ‡	Ryan's Hope	NBC	
1977 (4th)	Joseph Behar	Days of Our Lives	NBC	
1977 (4th)	Ira Cirker	Another World	NBC	
1977 (4th)	Paul E. Davis and Leonard Valenta	As the World Turns	CBS	
1977 (4th)	Al Rabin	Days of Our Lives	NBC	
1977 (4th)	John Sedwick	The Edge of Night	ABC	
1978 (4th)	Richard Dunlap ‡	The Young and the Restless	CBS	
1978 (4th)	Ira Cirker	Another World	NBC	
1978 (4th)	Robert Myhrum	Love of Life	CBS	
1978 (4th)	Al Rabin	Days of Our Lives	NBC	
1978 (4th)	Lela Swift	Ryan's Hope	NBC	
1978 (4th)	Richard T. McCue	As the World Turns	CBS	

=== Outstanding Drama Series Directing Team ===
==== 1979–1989 ====
Year	Program	Network	Ref
1979 (6th)	Ryan's Hope ‡	ABC	
1979 (6th)	All My Children	ABC	
1979 (6th)	Another World	NBC	
1979 (6th)	Days of Our Lives	NBC	
1979 (6th)	The Edge of Night	ABC	
1979 (6th)	The Young and the Restless	CBS	
1980 (7th)	Ryan's Hope ‡	ABC	
1980 (7th)	All My Children	ABC	
1980 (7th)	Another World	NBC	
1980 (7th)	The Edge of Night	ABC	
1980 (7th)	General Hospital	ABC	
1980 (7th)	Love of Life	CBS	
1981 (8th)	General Hospital ‡	ABC	
1981 (8th)	All My Children	ABC	
1981 (8th)	One Life to Live	ABC	
1982 (9th)	General Hospital ‡	ABC	
1982 (9th)	All My Children	ABC	
1982 (9th)	The Edge of Night	ABC	
1982 (9th)	One Life to Live	ABC	
1983 (10th)	One Life to Live ‡	ABC	
1983 (10th)	All My Children	ABC	
1983 (10th)	General Hospital	ABC	
1984 (11th)	One Life to Live ‡	ABC	
1984 (11th)	All My Children	ABC	
1985 (12th)	Guiding Light ‡	CBS	
1985 (12th)	As the World Turns	CBS	
1985 (12th)	Days of Our Lives	NBC	
1985 (12th)	All My Children	ABC	
1985 (12th)	One Life to Live	ABC	
1986 (13th)	The Young and the Restless ‡	CBS	
1986 (13th)	As the World Turns	CBS	
1986 (13th)	Days of Our Lives	NBC	
1986 (13th)	Guiding Light	CBS	
1986 (13th)	One Life to Live	ABC	
1987 (14th)	The Young and the Restless ‡	CBS	
1987 (14th)	All My Children	ABC	
1987 (14th)	As the World Turns	CBS	
1987 (14th)	Days of Our Lives	NBC	
1988 (15th)	The Young and the Restless ‡	CBS	
1988 (15th)	As the World Turns	CBS	
1988 (15th)	Days of Our Lives	NBC	
1988 (15th)	One Life to Live	ABC	
1988 (15th)	Superior Court	syndicated	
1989 (16th)	The Young and the Restless ‡	CBS	
1989 (16th)	As the World Turns	CBS	
1989 (16th)	Family Medical Center	syndicated	
1989 (16th)	Loving	ABC	
1989 (16th)	One Life to Live	ABC	

==== 1990s ====
Year	Program	Network	Ref
1990 (17th)	Santa Barbara ‡	NBC	
1990 (17th)	All My Children	ABC	
1990 (17th)	As the World Turns	CBS	
1990 (17th)	Guiding Light	CBS	
1990 (17th)	The Young and the Restless	CBS	
1991 (18th)	Santa Barbara ‡	NBC	
1991 (18th)	All My Children	ABC	
1991 (18th)	Guiding Light	CBS	
1991 (18th)	The Young and the Restless	CBS	
1992 (19th)	Another World ‡	NBC	
1992 (19th)	As the World Turns	CBS	
1992 (19th)	The Young and the Restless	CBS	
1993 (20th)	As the World Turns ‡	CBS	
1993 (20th)	All My Children	ABC	
1993 (20th)	Another World	NBC	
1993 (20th)	Days of Our Lives	NBC	
1993 (20th)	Guiding Light	CBS	
1993 (20th)	The Young and the Restless	CBS	
1994 (21st)	Guiding Light ‡	CBS	
1994 (21st)	All My Children	ABC	
1994 (21st)	The Young and the Restless	CBS	
1995 (22nd)	All My Children ‡	ABC	
1995 (22nd)	Another World	NBC	
1995 (22nd)	As the World Turns	CBS	
1995 (22nd)	One Life to Live	ABC	
1995 (22nd)	The Young and the Restless	CBS	
1996 (23rd)	The Young and the Restless ‡	CBS	
1996 (23rd)	All My Children	ABC	
1996 (23rd)	Days of Our Lives	NBC	
1996 (23rd)	General Hospital	ABC	
1997 (24th)	The Young and the Restless ‡	CBS	
1997 (24th)	All My Children	ABC	
1997 (24th)	Days of Our Lives	NBC	
1997 (24th)	General Hospital	ABC	
1998 (25th)	The Young and the Restless ‡	CBS	
1998 (25th)	All My Children	ABC	
1998 (25th)	Days of Our Lives	NBC	
1998 (25th)	General Hospital	ABC	
1999 (26th)	The Young and the Restless ‡	CBS	
1999 (26th)	All My Children	ABC	
1999 (26th)	Days of Our Lives	NBC	
1999 (26th)	General Hospital	ABC	
1999 (26th)	Sunset Beach	NBC	

==== 2000s ====
Year	Program	Network	Ref
2000 (27th)	General Hospital ‡	ABC	
2000 (27th)	All My Children	ABC	
2000 (27th)	The Bold and the Beautiful	CBS	
2000 (27th)	Sunset Beach	NBC	
2000 (27th)	The Young and the Restless	CBS	
2001 (28th)	The Young and the Restless ‡	CBS	
2001 (28th)	All My Children	ABC	
2001 (28th)	As the World Turns	CBS	
2001 (28th)	General Hospital	ABC	
2001 (28th)	Passions	NBC	
2002 (29th)	The Young and the Restless ‡	CBS	
2002 (29th)	All My Children	ABC	
2002 (29th)	As the World Turns	CBS	
2002 (29th)	The Bold and the Beautiful	CBS	
2003 (30th)	All My Children ‡	ABC	
2003 (30th)	As the World Turns	CBS	
2003 (30th)	Days of Our Lives	NBC	
2003 (30th)	Passions	NBC	
2004 (31st)	General Hospital ‡	ABC	
2004 (31st)	One Life to Live	ABC	
2004 (31st)	Passions	NBC	
2004 (31st)	The Young and the Restless	CBS	
2005 (32nd)	General Hospital ‡	ABC	
2005 (32nd)	All My Children	ABC	
2005 (32nd)	Guiding Light	CBS	
2005 (32nd)	The Young and the Restless	CBS	
2006 (33rd)	General Hospital ‡	ABC	
2006 (33rd)	The Bold and the Beautiful	CBS	
2006 (33rd)	Days of Our Lives	NBC	
2006 (33rd)	The Young and the Restless	CBS	
2007 (34th)	As the World Turns ‡	CBS	
2007 (34th)	General Hospital	ABC	
2007 (34th)	Guiding Light	CBS	
2007 (34th)	One Life to Live	ABC	
2008 (35th)	One Life to Live ‡	ABC	
2008 (35th)	All My Children	ABC	
2008 (35th)	The Bold and the Beautiful	CBS	
2008 (35th)	General Hospital	ABC	
2009 (36th)	One Life to Live ‡	ABC	
2009 (36th)	All My Children	ABC	
2009 (36th)	Days of Our Lives	NBC	

==== 2010s ====
Year	Program	Network	Ref
2010 (37th)	General Hospital ‡	ABC	
2010 (37th)	All My Children	ABC	
2010 (37th)	The Bold and the Beautiful	CBS	
2010 (37th)	One Life to Live	ABC	
2011 (38th)	The Bold and the Beautiful ‡	CBS	
2011 (38th)	The Young and the Restless ‡	CBS	
2011 (38th)	General Hospital	ABC	
2011 (38th)	One Life to Live	ABC	
2012 (39th)	General Hospital ‡	ABC	
2012 (39th)	The Bold and the Beautiful	CBS	
2012 (39th)	One Life to Live	ABC	
2012 (39th)	The Young and the Restless	CBS	
2013 (40th)	The Bold and the Beautiful ‡	CBS	
2013 (40th)	Days of Our Lives	NBC	
2013 (40th)	General Hospital	ABC	
2013 (40th)	The Young and the Restless	CBS	
2014 (41st)	One Life to Live (Note: Directors: Habib Azar, Gary Donatelli, Christopher Goutman, Jill Mitwell, Associate Directors: Tracey Casper Lang, Mary Ryan, Shirley Simmons, Stage Managers: Fritz Brekeller, Keith Greer, Brendan M. Higgins, Production Associates: Ilene Frakel, Dana Randles) ‡	TOLN.com	
2014 (41st)	The Bold and the Beautiful (Note: Directors: Jennifer Howard, Deveney Kelly, Cynthia J. Popp, David Shaughnessey, Michael Stich, Associate Directors: Clyde Kaplan, Jennifer Scott-Christenson, Catherine Sedwick, Steve Wacker, Stage Managers: Doug Hayden, Lisa Winther-Houston, Laura Yale, Production Associates: Lori Staffier)	CBS	
2014 (41st)	The Young and the Restless (Note: Directors: Casey Childs, Michael Eilbaum, Sally McDonald, Conal O'Brien, Owen Renfroe, Associate Directors: Daniel Cahn, Robbin Phillips, Stage Managers: Tom McDermott, Herb Weaver, Production Associates: Ericka Chavez, Vanessa Noland, Nancy Ortenberg)	CBS	
2015 (42nd)	The Bold and the Beautiful (Note: Directors: Jennifer Howard, Deveney Kelly, Cynthia J. Popp, David Shaughnessey, Michael Stich, Associate Directors: Clyde Kaplan, Jennifer Scott-Christenson, Catherine Sedwick, Steve Wacker, Stage Managers: Doug Hayden, Lisa Winther-Houston, Laura Yale, Production Associates: Robin Harvey, Lori Staffier) ‡	CBS	
2015 (42nd)	Days of Our Lives (Note: Directors: Albert Alarr, Grant Johnson, Herbert Stein, Steven Williford, Associate Directors: Michael Fiamingo, Tina Keller, Joseph Lumer, Jenee Muyeau, Zoli Osaze, Lugh Powers Stage Managers: Fran Bellini DeSimone, Stuart Howard, Production Associates: Brenda Glazer, Holly Metts, Sara Peterson, Lucy Yalenian)	NBC	
2015 (42nd)	General Hospital (Note: Directors: Larry Carpenter, William Ludel, Scott McKinsey, Penny Pengra, Frank Valentini, Phideaux Xavier, Associate Directors: Christine Cooper, Peter Fillmore, Paul Glass, Dave MacLeod, Christine Magarian Ucar, Denise Van Cleave, Stage Managers: Crystal Craft, Craig McManus Production Associates: Jillian Dedote, Marika Kushel, Allison Reames)	ABC	
2015 (42nd)	The Young and the Restless (Note: Directors: Casey Childs, Michael Eilbaum, Sally McDonald, Conal O'Brien, Owen Renfroe, Associate Directors: Daniel Cahn, Robbin Phillips, Stage Managers: Tom McDermott, Herb Weaver, Production Associates: Ericka Chavez, Vanessa Noland, Nancy Ortenberg)	CBS	
2016 (43rd)	General Hospital ‡	ABC	
2016 (43rd)	The Bold and the Beautiful	CBS	
2016 (43rd)	Days of Our Lives	NBC	
2016 (43rd)	The Young and the Restless	CBS	
2017 (44th)	General Hospital ‡	ABC	
2017 (44th)	The Bold and the Beautiful	CBS	
2017 (44th)	Days of Our Lives	NBC	
2017 (44th)	The Young and the Restless	CBS	
2018 (45th)	Days of Our Lives ‡	NBC	
2018 (45th)	The Bold and the Beautiful	CBS	
2018 (45th)	General Hospital	ABC	
2018 (45th)	The Young and the Restless	CBS	
2019 (46th)	The Young and the Restless ‡	ABC	
2019 (46th)	The Bold and the Beautiful	CBS	
2019 (46th)	Days of Our Lives	NBC	
2019 (46th)	General Hospital	ABC	

==== 2020s ====
Year	Program	Network	Ref
2020 (47th)	General Hospital ‡	ABC	
2020 (47th)	The Bold and the Beautiful	CBS	
2020 (47th)	Days of Our Lives	NBC	
2020 (47th)	The Young and the Restless	CBS	
2021 (48th)	General Hospital ‡	ABC	
2021 (48th)	The Bold and the Beautiful	CBS	
2021 (48th)	Days of Our Lives	NBC	
2021 (48th)	The Young and the Restless	CBS	
2022 (49th)	General Hospital ‡	ABC	
2022 (49th)	Beyond Salem	Peacock	
2022 (49th)	Days of Our Lives	NBC	
2022 (49th)	The Young and the Restless	CBS	
2023 (50th)	General Hospital ‡	ABC	
2023 (50th)	The Bay	Popstar! TV	
2023 (50th)	The Bold and the Beautiful	CBS	
2023 (50th)	Beyond Salem: Chapter Two	Peacock	
2023 (50th)	Days of Our Lives	Peacock	
2023 (50th)	The Young and the Restless	CBS	
2024 (51st)	General Hospital ‡	ABC	
2024 (51st)	The Bay	Popstar! TV	
2024 (51st)	The Bold and the Beautiful	CBS	
2024 (51st)	Days of Our Lives	Peacock	
2024 (51st)	The Young and the Restless	CBS	
2025 (52nd)	General Hospital ‡	ABC	
2025 (52nd)	Days of Our Lives	Peacock	
2025 (52nd)	The Young and the Restless	CBS	
2026 (53rd)	Days of Our Lives ‡	Peacock	
2026 (53rd)	General Hospital	ABC	
2026 (53rd)	The Young and the Restless	CBS	

== Series with multiple wins ==
15 wins

- General Hospital

14 wins

- The Young and the Restless

6 wins

- One Life to Live

3 wins

- Days of Our Lives
- Ryan's Hope
- The Bold and the Beautiful

2 wins

- All My Children
- As the World Turns
- Guiding Light
- Santa Barbara
