= 49th Directors Guild of America Awards =

- Date: March 8, 1997
- Location: Hyatt Regency Century Plaza, Los Angeles, California; Sheraton New York Hotel, New York City
- Country: United States
- Presented by: Directors Guild of America
- Hosted by: Carl Reiner (Los Angeles); Mary Tyler Moore (New York)

Highlights
- Best Director Feature Film: The English Patient – Anthony Minghella
- Best Director Documentary: Looking for Richard – Al Pacino
- Website: https://www.dga.org/Awards/History/1990s/1996.aspx?value=1996

The 49th Directors Guild of America Awards, honoring the outstanding directorial achievements in films, documentary and television in 1996, were presented on March 8, 1997 at the Hyatt Regency Century Plaza and the Sheraton New York Hotel. The simultaneous ceremonies were hosted by Carl Reiner in Los Angeles and Mary Tyler Moore in New York. The nominees in the feature film category were announced on January 21, 1997 and the other nominations were announced starting on February 4, 1997.

== Winners and nominees ==
=== Film ===
Feature Film

Anthony Minghella – The English Patient

- Joel Coen – Fargo
- Cameron Crowe – Jerry Maguire
- Scott Hicks – Shine
- Mike Leigh – Secrets and Lies
Documentaries

Al Pacino – Looking for Richard

- Joe Berlinger and Bruce Sinofsky – Paradise Lost: The Child Murders at Robin Hood Hills
- Leon Gast – When We Were Kings
- Jeanne Jordan and Steven Ascher – Troublesome Creek: A Midwestern
- Isaac Mizrahi – The Great War and the Shaping of the 20th Century for "Slaughter"

=== Television ===
Drama Series

Christopher Chulack – ER for "Fear of Flying"

- Paris Barclay – ER for "Ask Me No Questions, I'll Tell You No Lies"
- Donna Deitch – NYPD Blue for "These Old Bones"
- Mimi Leder – ER for "The Healers"
- Mark Tinker – NYPD Blue for "A Death in the Family"
Comedy Series

Andy Ackerman – Seinfeld for "The Rye"

- Robert Berlinger – 3rd Rock from the Sun for "See Dick Continue to Run"
- Todd Holland – The Larry Sanders Show for "Everybody Loves Larry"
- Alan Myerson – The Larry Sanders Show for "Ellen, or Isn't She"
- David Steinberg – Mad About You for "The Finale"
Miniseries or TV Film

Betty Thomas – The Late Shift

- Uli Edel – Rasputin: Dark Servant of Destiny
- John Frankenheimer – Andersonville
- Robert Harmon – Gotti
- Anjelica Huston – Bastard out of Carolina
Musical Variety

Don Mischer – Opening Ceremonies: Atlanta Olympic Games

- Ellen Brown – The Tonight Show With Jay Leno from Chicago
- Robert Fishman – Sergei Grinkov: Celebration of a Life
- Jeff Margolis – The 68th Annual Academy Awards
- Thomas Schlamme – Tracey Takes On... for "Romance"
Daytime Serials

Kathryn Foster and Mike Denney – The Young and the Restless for "Episode #5875"

- Bruce S. Barry – Guiding Light for "Episode #12451"
- Scott McKinsey – General Hospital for "Episode #8492"
- Jill Mitwell – One Life to Live for "Episode #7285"
- Michael Stich – The Bold and the Beautiful for "Episode #2393"
Children's Programs

Stuart Margolin – Salt Water Moose

- Arthur Albert – Bailey Kipper's P.O.V. for "Talk Ain't Cheap"
- Michael Kennedy – Robin of Locksley
- Brian Robbins – Sports Theater for "4 Points"
- Kristoffer Tabori – ABC Afterschool Special for "Educating Mom"

=== Commercials ===
Commercials

Tarsem Singh – Nike's "Good vs. Evil", Levi's' "Poolboy", and Coca-Cola's "Red"

- James Gartner – Apple's "Crowd Control" and AT&T's "Amazing Grace"
- David Kellogg – Little Caesars' "Training Camp", American Express' "Gas Pump", and Kodak's "Pie Plate"
- Peter Nydrle – Coca-Cola's "Savion’s Challenge", Harley-Davidson's "Waiting for the Bus" and "Birds", National Car Rental's "Dolphins", Maxfli's "Tell You Something", and Reebok's "Gods"
- Kinka Usher – Nissan's "Dream Garage", "Toys - G.I. Joe" and "Parking Meter", and Polaroid's "Dog & Cat" and "Architect"

=== D.W. Griffith Award ===
- Stanley Kubrick

=== Lifetime Achievement in Sports Direction ===
- Larry Kamm

=== Lifetime Achievement in News Direction ===
- Max A. Schindler

=== Robert B. Aldrich Service Award ===
- Delbert Mann

=== Franklin J. Schaffner Achievement Award ===
- Joseph Dicso

=== Diversity Award ===
- Christopher Chulack
- Bruce Paltrow
- John Wells
