= 48th Directors Guild of America Awards =

- Date: March 2, 1996
- Location: Hyatt Regency Century Plaza, Los Angeles, California; New York City
- Country: United States
- Presented by: Directors Guild of America
- Hosted by: Carl Reiner (Los Angeles)

Highlights
- Best Director Feature Film: Apollo 13 – Ron Howard
- Best Director Documentary: Crumb – Terry Zwigoff
- Website: https://www.dga.org/Awards/History/1990s/1995.aspx?value=1995

The 48th Directors Guild of America Awards, honoring the outstanding directorial achievements in films, documentary and television in 1995, were presented on March 2, 1996 at the Hyatt Regency Century Plaza as well as in New York. The ceremony in Los Angeles was hosted by Carl Reiner. The nominees in the feature film category were announced on January 22, 1996 and the other nominations were announced in February.

== Winners and nominees ==
=== Film ===
Feature Film

Ron Howard – Apollo 13

- Mike Figgis – Leaving Las Vegas
- Mel Gibson – Braveheart
- Ang Lee – Sense and Sensibility
- Michael Radford – Il Postino: The Postman
Documentaries

Terry Zwigoff – Crumb

- Deborah Hoffmann – Complaints of a Dutiful Daughter
- Freida Lee Mock – Maya Lin: A Strong Clear Vision
- Bill Van Daalen – Indianapolis: Ship of Doom
- Helen Whitney – American Masters for "Richard Avedon: Darkness and Light"

=== Television ===
Drama Series

Christopher Chulack – ER for "Hell and High Water"

- Félix Enríquez Alcalá – ER for "Do One, Teach One, Kill One"
- Chris Carter – The X-Files for "The List"
- Charles Haid – Murder One for "Pilot"
- Mimi Leder – ER for "Love's Labor Lost"
Comedy Series

Gordon Hunt – Mad About You for "The Alan Brady Show"

- Andy Ackerman – Seinfeld for "The Gum"
- James Burrows – Friends for "The One with the Birth"
- Todd Holland – The Larry Sanders Show for "Arthur After Hours"
- David Lee – Frasier for "Daphne's Room"
Miniseries or TV Film

Mick Jackson – Indictment: The McMartin Trial

- Robert Markowitz – The Tuskegee Airmen
- Daniel Petrie – Kissinger and Nixon
- Frank Pierson – Truman
- Peter Werner – Almost Golden: The Jessica Savitch Story
Musical Variety

Matthew Diamond – Great Performances for "Some Enchanted Evening: Celebrating Oscar Hammerstein"

- Ellen Brown – The Tonight Show With Jay Leno from Las Vegas
- Hal Gurnee – Late Show with David Letterman from London
- Louis J. Horvitz – Sinatra: 80 Years My Way
- Jeff Margolis – The 67th Annual Academy Awards
Daytime Serials

William Ludel and Alan Pultz – General Hospital for "Episode #8248"

- Joseph Behar – General Hospital for "Episode #8183"
- Bruce S. Barry – Guiding Light for "Episode #12063"
- Susan Flannery – The Bold and the Beautiful for "Episode #2167"
- Scott McKinsey and Shelley Curtis – General Hospital for "Episode #8233"

=== Commercials ===
Commercials

Robert Lieberman – Hallmark Cards' "Jeffrey's Secret" and Merrill Lynch's "Sisters Already Retired"

- Steven Chase – Pepsi's "All Sports Basketball", Mountain Dew's "Crooner", Anheuser-Busch's "Fishing" and "Primate", and AT&T's "Paddleball"
- Tony Kaye – Guinness' "Men & Women", TAG Heuer's "Mind Games", and Volvo's "Twister"
- Joe Pytka – Pepsi's "Diner", "Set Piece" and "Stranded"
- Kinka Usher – Timex Corporation's "Angel" and "Dog To Vet", and California Milk's "Full Body Cast", "Interrogation" and "Trix"

=== D.W. Griffith Award ===
- Woody Allen

=== Lifetime Achievement in Sports Direction ===
- Tony Verna

=== Lifetime Achievement in News Direction ===
- Arthur Bloom

=== Robert B. Aldrich Service Award ===
- Daniel Petrie

=== Franklin J. Schaffner Achievement Award ===
- Don Lewis Barnhart

=== Honorary Life Member ===
- Chuck Jones
