= 62nd Directors Guild of America Awards =

- Date: January 30, 2010
- Location: Hyatt Regency Century Plaza, Los Angeles, California
- Country: United States
- Presented by: Directors Guild of America
- Hosted by: Carl Reiner

Highlights
- Best Director Feature Film: The Hurt Locker – Kathryn Bigelow
- Best Director Documentary: The Cove – Louie Psihoyos
- Website: https://www.dga.org/Awards/History/2000s/2009.aspx?value=2009

The 62nd Directors Guild of America Awards, honoring the outstanding directorial achievements in films, documentary and television in 2009, were presented on January 30, 2010, at the Hyatt Regency Century Plaza. The ceremony was hosted by Carl Reiner. The nominees for the feature film category were announced on January 7, 2010, the nominations for the television and commercial categories were announced on January 8, 2010, and the nominees for documentary directing were announced on January 12, 2010.

== Winners and nominees ==
=== Film ===
Feature Film

Kathryn Bigelow – The Hurt Locker

- James Cameron – Avatar
- Lee Daniels – Precious
- Jason Reitman – Up in the Air
- Quentin Tarantino – Inglourious Basterds
Documentaries

Louie Psihoyos – The Cove

- Sacha Gervasi – Anvil! The Story of Anvil
- Mai Iskander – Garbage Dreams
- Robert Kenner – Food, Inc.
- Geoffrey Smith – The English Surgeon
- Agnès Varda – The Beaches of Agnès

=== Television ===
Drama Series

Lesli Linka Glatter – Mad Men for "Guy Walks Into an Advertising Agency"

- Paris Barclay – In Treatment for "Week 4: Gina"
- Jack Bender – Lost for "The Incident"
- Jennifer Getzinger – Mad Men for "The Gypsy and the Hobo"
- Matthew Weiner – Mad Men for "Shut the Door. Have a Seat."
Comedy Series

Jason Winer – Modern Family for "Pilot"

- Paris Barclay – Glee for "Wheels"
- Larry Charles – Curb Your Enthusiasm for "The Table Read"
- Ryan Murphy – Glee for "Pilot"
- Jeff Schaffer – Curb Your Enthusiasm for "Seinfeld"
Miniseries or TV Film

Ross Katz – Taking Chance

- Bob Balaban – Georgia O'Keeffe
- Thomas Carter – Gifted Hands: The Ben Carson Story
- John Kent Harrison – The Courageous Heart of Irena Sendler
- Michael Sucsy – Grey Gardens
Musical Variety

Don Mischer – We Are One: The Obama Inaugural Celebration at the Lincoln Memorial

- Joel Gallen – The 25th Anniversary Rock and Roll Hall of Fame Concert
- Roger Goodman – The 81st Annual Academy Awards
- Louis J. Horvitz – 2009 Kennedy Center Honors
- Don Roy King – Saturday Night Live for "Host: Justin Timberlake"
Daytime Serials

Christopher Goutman – As The World Turns for "Once Upon a Time"

- Casey Childs – All My Children for "Bianca and Reese Get Married"
- Dean LaMont – The Young and the Restless for "Billy's New Year's Eve Revelation"
- William Ludel – General Hospital for "Macho Men"
- Sally McDonald – The Young and the Restless for "Six Minutes and Counting"
- Cynthia J. Popp – The Bold and the Beautiful for "Fashion Challenge Sabotage"
Reality Programs

Craig Borders – Extreme Engineering for "Hong Kong Bridge"

- Sueann Fincke – Dog Whisperer with Cesar Millan for "Puppy Mills Exposed"
- Eytan Keller – The Next Iron Chef for "201"
- Zach Merck – Six Beers of Separation
- Bertram van Munster – The Amazing Race for "Don't Let a Cheese Hit Me"
Children's Programs

Allison Liddi-Brown – Princess Protection Program

- Martha Coolidge – An American Girl: Chrissa Stands Strong
- Fred Savage – Zeke & Luther for "Pilot"
- Amy Schatz – Hard Times for an American Girl: The Great Depression
- Andy Wolk – Lincoln Heights for "Time To Let Go"

=== Commercials ===
Commercials

Tom Kuntz – Cadbury's "Eyebrows", Old Spice's "Scents For Gents", Skittles' "Tailor", and CareerBuilder's "Tips"

- Joaquin Baca-Asay – CSX's "Breathe", Bank of America's "Doors", LensCrafters' "See What You Love", and Volvo's "Switch"
- Garth Davis – U.S. Cellular's "Shadow Puppets"
- Craig Gillespie – Cars.com's "David Abernathy", Guinness' "Slide", and Orbit's "Dusty"
- Chris Palmer – Budweiser's "Lyric" and J2O's "Riviera Truckstop (Garage Playboy)" and "A Horse Called Cynthia (Cowboy - Mr. Darcy)"

=== Lifetime Achievement in Feature Film ===
- Norman Jewison

=== Lifetime Achievement in News Direction ===
- Roger Goodman

=== Frank Capra Achievement Award ===
- Cleve Landsberg

=== Franklin J. Schaffner Achievement Award ===
- Maria Jimenez Henley

=== Honorary Life Member ===
- Bob Iger
- Barry Meyer
