= 46th Directors Guild of America Awards =

- Date: March 5, 1994
- Location: The Beverly Hilton, Los Angeles, California; Russian Tea Room, New York City
- Country: United States
- Presented by: Directors Guild of America
- Hosted by: Carl Reiner (Los Angeles); Charlie Rose (New York)

Highlights
- Best Director Feature Film: Schindler's List – Steven Spielberg
- Best Director Documentary: Fallen Champ: The Untold Story of Mike Tyson – Barbara Kopple
- Website: https://www.dga.org/Awards/History/1990s/1993.aspx?value=1993

The 46th Directors Guild of America Awards, honoring the outstanding directorial achievements in films, documentary and television in 1993, were presented on March 5, 1994, at the Beverly Hilton and the Russian Tea Room. The ceremony in Beverly Hills was hosted by Carl Reiner and the ceremony in New York was hosted by Charlie Rose. The feature film nominees were announced on January 24, 1994 and the other nominations were announced on January 31, 1994, and February 2, 1994.

== Winners and nominees ==
=== Film ===
Feature Film

Steven Spielberg – Schindler's List

- Jane Campion – The Piano
- Andrew Davis – The Fugitive
- James Ivory – The Remains of the Day
- Martin Scorsese – The Age of Innocence
Documentaries

Barbara Kopple – Fallen Champ: The Untold Story of Mike Tyson

- Shari Cookson – Skinheads USA: Soldiers of the Race War
- Bruce Kuerten and John DiJulio – From Fields of Promise
- Susan Raymond – I Am a Promise: The Children of Stanton Elementary School
- Susan Steinberg – American Masters for "Paul Simon: Born at the Right Time"

=== Television ===
Drama Series

Gregory Hoblit – NYPD Blue for "Pilot"

- Lou Antonio – Picket Fences for "The Dancing Bandit"
- Charles Haid – NYPD Blue for "True Confessions"
- Eric Laneuville – NYPD Blue for "From Hare to Eternity"
- Barry Levinson – Homicide: Life on the Street for "Gone for Goode"
Comedy Series

James Burrows – Frasier for "The Good Son"

- Peter Bonerz – Murphy Brown for "Angst for the Memory"
- Tom Cherones – Seinfeld for "The Mango"
- Michael Lange – Northern Exposure for "Kaddish for Uncle Manny"
- Betty Thomas – Dream On for "Silent Night, Holy Cow"
Miniseries or TV Film

Michael Ritchie – The Positively True Adventures of the Alleged Texas Cheerleader-Murdering Mom

- Emile Ardolino – Gypsy
- Robert Butler – Lois & Clark: The New Adventures of Superman for "Pilot"
- Ian Sander – I'll Fly Away: Then and Now
- Roger Spottiswoode – And the Band Played On
Musical Variety

Jeff Margolis – The 65th Annual Academy Awards

- Humphrey Burton – Leonard Bernstein Place
- Hal Gurnee – Late Show with David Letterman
- Louis J. Horvitz – 1993 Kennedy Center Honors
- Don Scardino – Tracey Ullman Takes On New York
Daytime Serials

Jill Mitwell – One Life to Live for "Episode #6356"

- Bruce S. Barry – Guiding Light for "Episode #11644"
- Joseph Behar – General Hospital for "Episode #7819"
- Brian Mertes – Guiding Light for "Episode #11563"
- Michael Stich – The Bold and the Beautiful for "Episode #1693"

=== Commercials ===
Commercials

James Gartner – FedEx' "Applause" and "Golden Package", and AT&T's "Baseball & Piroshki"

- Mark Coppos – United Parcel Service's "Drivers" and "The Office", Reebok's "Kick/Farmer-Patrick", MasterCard's "Supermarket", and Infiniti's "Walkaround/Rehearsal"
- Daniel Duchovny – Wachovia's "Crown Account", Pine Street Inn's "I'll Be Home For Christmas", Foundation Health's "Otters", and Harvard Community Health Plan's "Scott"
- Peter Goldschmidt – Air France's "Speed of Sound"
- Joe Pytka – Nike's "Barkley of Seville" and "Kenya", and Pepsi's "Playground"

=== D.W. Griffith Award ===
- Robert Altman

=== Lifetime Achievement in Sports Direction ===
- Doug Wilson

=== Frank Capra Achievement Award ===
- Peter A. Runfolo

=== Robert B. Aldrich Service Award ===
- Burt Bluestein

=== Franklin J. Schaffner Achievement Award ===
- James Wall
