= 57th Directors Guild of America Awards =

- Date: January 29, 2005
- Location: The Beverly Hilton, Beverly Hills, California
- Country: United States
- Presented by: Directors Guild of America
- Hosted by: Carl Reiner

Highlights
- Best Director Feature Film: Million Dollar Baby – Clint Eastwood
- Best Director Documentary: The Story of the Weeping Camel – Byambasuren Davaa and Luigi Falorni
- Website: https://www.dga.org/Awards/History/2000s/2004.aspx?value=2004

The 57th Directors Guild of America Awards, honoring the outstanding directorial achievements in films, documentary and television in 2004, were presented on January 29, 2005, at the Beverly Hilton. The ceremony was hosted by Carl Reiner. The nominees in the feature film category were announced on January 6, 2005 and the other nominations starting on January 10, 2005.

== Winners and nominees ==
=== Film ===
Feature Film

Clint Eastwood – Million Dollar Baby

- Marc Forster – Finding Neverland
- Taylor Hackford – Ray
- Alexander Payne – Sideways
- Martin Scorsese – The Aviator
Documentaries

Byambasuren Davaa and Luigi Falorni – The Story of the Weeping Camel

- Zana Briski and Ross Kauffman – Born into Brothels
- Ross McElwee – Bright Leaves
- Michael Moore – Fahrenheit 9/11
- Jehane Noujaim – Control Room

=== Television ===
Drama Series

Walter Hill – Deadwood for "Deadwood"

- J. J. Abrams – Lost for "Pilot (Part 1)"
- Christopher Chulack – ER for "Time of Death"
- John Patterson – The Sopranos for "All Due Respect"
- Tim Van Patten – The Sopranos for "Long Term Parking"
Comedy Series

Tim Van Patten – Sex and the City for "An American Girl in Paris: Part Deux"

- Bryan Gordon – Curb Your Enthusiasm for "The 5 Wood"
- Charles McDougall – Desperate Housewives for "Pilot"
- Arlene Sanford – Desperate Housewives for "Pretty Little Picture"
- Robert B. Weide – Curb Your Enthusiasm for "The Car Pool Lane"
Miniseries or TV Film

Joseph Sargent – Something the Lord Made

- Robert Altman – Tanner on Tanner
- Stephen Hopkins – The Life and Death of Peter Sellers
- Lloyd Kramer – The Five People You Meet in Heaven
- Christopher Reeve – The Brooke Ellison Story
Musical Variety

Bruce Gowers – Genius: A Night for Ray Charles

- Ron de Moraes – Great Performances for "Eric Clapton: Crossroads Guitar Festival"
- Jerry Foley – Late Show with David Letterman for "Episode #2187"
- Louis J. Horvitz – The 76th Annual Academy Awards
- Chuck O'Neil – The Daily Show with Jon Stewart
Daytime Serials

Bruce S. Barry – Guiding Light for "Episode #14321"

- Joseph Behar – General Hospital for "Episode #10461"
- Christopher Goutman – As the World Turns for "Episode #12166"
- Matt Lagle and Brian Mertes – Guiding Light for "Episode #14322"
- Conal O'Brien – All My Children for "Episode #8768"
Children's Programs

Stuart Gillard – Going to the Mat

- Duwayne Dunham – Tiger Cruise
- Paul Hoen – Searching for David's Heart
- Jeremy Kagan – Crown Heights
- Lee Rose – Jack

=== Commercials ===
Commercials

Noam Murro – Adidas' "Carry", Starbucks' "Glen", and eBay's "Toy Boat"

- Dante Ariola – Stella Artois' "Circus", Levi's' "Urban Legend", and Barclays' "Money Tree"
- Fredrik Bond – Three's "Cherry" and "Jelly Fish", and Nike's "The Other Game"
- Andrew Douglas – Renault's "Feel It", PricewaterhouseCoopers' "The Air", Barclays' "New Day", and Microsoft's "Hat"
- Jim Jenkins – Discovery Channel's "Antlers" and "Milk Truck", Nextel's "Dance Party", and TBS' "Strange Fruit"

=== Frank Capra Achievement Award ===
- Herb Adelman

=== Franklin J. Schaffner Achievement Award ===
- Stanley Faer

=== Diversity Award ===
- Steve McPherson

=== Presidents Award ===
- Gilbert Cates
