= 63rd Directors Guild of America Awards =

- Date: January 29, 2011
- Location: Hollywood and Highland Center, Los Angeles, California
- Country: United States
- Presented by: Directors Guild of America
- Hosted by: Carl Reiner

Highlights
- Best Director Feature Film: The King's Speech – Tom Hooper
- Best Director Documentary: Inside Job – Charles Ferguson
- Website: https://www.dga.org/Awards/History/2010s/2010.aspx?value=2010

The 63rd Directors Guild of America Awards, honoring the outstanding directorial achievements in films, documentary and television in 2010, were presented on January 29, 2011, at the Hollywood and Highland Center. The ceremony was hosted by Carl Reiner. The nominees for the feature film category were announced on January 10, 2011, the nominations for the television and commercial categories were announced on January 11, 2011, and the nominees for documentary directing were announced on January 12, 2011.

== Winners and nominees ==
=== Film ===
Feature Film

Tom Hooper – The King's Speech

- Darren Aronofsky – Black Swan
- David Fincher – The Social Network
- Christopher Nolan – Inception
- David O. Russell – The Fighter
Documentaries

Charles Ferguson – Inside Job

- Lixin Fan – Last Train Home
- Alex Gibney – Client 9: The Rise and Fall of Eliot Spitzer
- Davis Guggenheim – Waiting for "Superman"
- Tim Hetherington and Sebastian Junger – Restrepo

=== Television ===
Drama Series

Martin Scorsese – Boardwalk Empire for "Boardwalk Empire"

- Jack Bender – Lost for "The End"
- Allen Coulter – Boardwalk Empire for "Paris Green"
- Frank Darabont – The Walking Dead for "Days Gone Bye"
- Jennifer Getzinger – Mad Men for "The Suitcase"
Comedy Series

Michael Spiller – Modern Family for "Halloween"

- Steven Levitan – Modern Family for "Hawaii"
- Beth McCarthy-Miller – 30 Rock for "Live Show"
- Ryan Murphy – Glee for "The Power of Madonna"
- David Nutter – Entourage for "Lose Yourself"
Miniseries or TV Film

Mick Jackson – Temple Grandin

- Barry Levinson – You Don't Know Jack
- David Nutter and Jeremy Podeswa – The Pacific for "Basilone"
- Jeremy Podeswa – The Pacific for "Home"
- Tim Van Patten – The Pacific for "Okinawa"
Musical Variety

Glenn Weiss – The 64th Annual Tony Awards

- Don Roy King – Saturday Night Live for "Host: Betty White"
- Linda Mendoza – In Performance at The White House for "Paul McCartney: The Library of Congress Gershwin Prize for Popular Song"
- John C. Moffit – Bill Maher ...But I'm Not Wrong
- Chuck O'Neil – Rally to Restore Sanity and/or Fear
Daytime Serials

Larry Carpenter – One Life to Live for "Starr X'd Lovers, The Musical, Part Two"

- Sally McDonald – The Young and the Restless for "Ebenezer Newman"
- Jill Mitwell – One Life to Live for "Starr X'd Lovers, The Musical, Part Three"
- Owen Renfroe – General Hospital for "Francophrenia"
- Michael Stich – The Bold and the Beautiful for "A Reason to Live – Part 1"
Reality Programs

Eytan Keller – The Next Iron Chef for "Episode #301"

- Hisham Abed – The Hills for "Episode #601"
- Bryan O'Donnell – Private Chefs of Beverly Hills for "Challah Back"
- Brian Smith – MasterChef for "Episode #103"
- Bertram van Munster – The Amazing Race for "I Think We're Fighting the Germans. Right?"
Children's Programs

Eric Bross – The Boy Who Cried Werewolf

- Douglas Barr – Secrets of the Mountain
- Stuart Gillard – Avalon High
- Michael Grossman – StarStruck
- Paul Hoen – Camp Rock 2: The Final Jam
- Mikael Salomon – Unnatural History for "Pilot"

=== Commercials ===
Commercials

Stacy Wall – Nike's "Rise" and "Handshake", Microsoft's "Really?", and Adidas' "Slim Chin & D Rose"

- Frank Budgen – Sony Bravia's "World Cup" and "Thunderstruck" and Honda's "RGB"
- Craig Gillespie – Cars.com's "Timothy Richman", Snickers' "Game" and "Road Trip", and CareerBuilder's "Another Language" and "Casual Friday"
- Tim Godsall – DirecTV's "Opulence", Hyundai's "Bull", and HBO's "Eastbound & Mom"
- Tom Kuntz – Old Spice's "The Man Your Man Could Smell Like", "Questions", "Did You Know", and "Boat"
