= 61st Directors Guild of America Awards =

- Date: January 31, 2009
- Location: Hyatt Regency Century Plaza, Los Angeles, California
- Country: United States
- Presented by: Directors Guild of America
- Hosted by: Carl Reiner

Highlights
- Best Director Feature Film: Slumdog Millionaire – Danny Boyle
- Best Director Documentary: Waltz with Bashir – Ari Folman
- Website: https://www.dga.org/Awards/History/2000s/2008.aspx?value=2008

The 61st Directors Guild of America Awards, honoring the outstanding directorial achievements in films, documentary and television in 2008, were presented on January 31, 2009, at the Hyatt Regency Century Plaza. The ceremony was hosted by Carl Reiner. The nominees in the feature film category were announced on January 8, 2009, and the nominations for directorial achievement in television, documentaries and commercials were announced on January 9, 2009.

== Winners and nominees ==
=== Film ===
Feature Film

Danny Boyle – Slumdog Millionaire

- David Fincher – The Curious Case of Benjamin Button
- Ron Howard – Frost/Nixon
- Christopher Nolan – The Dark Knight
- Gus Van Sant – Milk
Documentaries

Ari Folman – Waltz with Bashir

- Peter Gilbert and Steve James – At the Death House Door
- Elizabeth Farnsworth and Patricio Lanfranco – The Judge and the General
- James Marsh – Man on Wire
- Gonzalo Arijón – Stranded: I've Come from a Plane that Crashed in the Mountains

=== Television ===
Drama Series

Dan Attias – The Wire for "Transitions"

- Paris Barclay – In Treatment for "Week 8: Alex"
- Jack Bender – Lost for "The Constant"
- Alan Taylor – Mad Men for "The Mountain King"
- Matthew Weiner – Mad Men for "Meditations in an Emergency"
Comedy Series

Paul Feig – The Office for "Dinner Party"

- Paris Barclay – Weeds for "The Three Coolers"
- Julian Farino – Entourage for "Tree Tippers"
- Beth McCarthy-Miller – 30 Rock for "Reunion"
- Don Scardino – 30 Rock for "Do-Over"
Miniseries or TV Film

Jay Roach – Recount

- Bob Balaban – Bernard and Doris
- Tom Hooper – John Adams
- Kenny Leon – A Raisin in the Sun
- Mikael Salomon – The Andromeda Strain
Musical Variety

Bucky Gunts – Opening Ceremony Beijing 2008 Olympic Summer Games

- Louis J. Horvitz – The 80th Annual Academy Awards
- Don Roy King – Saturday Night Live
- Chuck O'Neil – The Daily Show with Jon Stewart for "Episode #13107"
- Glenn Weiss – The 62nd Annual Tony Awards
Daytime Serials

Larry Carpenter – One Life to Live for "So You Think You Can Be Shane Morasco's Father?"

- William Ludel – General Hospital for "Luke in Purgatory"
- Owen Renfroe – General Hospital for "Catch Me If You Can"
- Noel Maxam – Days of Our Lives for "This Is It"
- Herbert Stein – Days of Our Lives for "Airplane Crash Aftermath"
Reality Programs

Tony Croll – America's Next Top Model for "Episode #1002"

- Scott Messick – Pros vs. Joes for "Episode #301"
- J. Rupert Thompson – Estate of Panic for "That Sinking Feeling"
- Bertram van Munster – The Amazing Race for "Episode #1303"
- Kent Weed – I Survived a Japanese Game Show for "A Long Way From Home"
Children's Programs

Amy Schatz – Classical Baby for "The Poetry Show"

- Matthew Diamond – Camp Rock
- Paul Hoen – The Cheetah Girls: One World
- Shawn Ku – The American Mall
- Lev L. Spiro – Minutemen

=== Commercials ===
Commercials

Peter Thwaites – Barclaycard's "Waterslide" and Guinness' "Light Show"

- Fredrik Bond – Levi's' "First Time"
- David Fincher – Nike's "Fate", Apple's "Hallway", and Stand Up to Cancer's "Stand Up For Something"
- Tom Kuntz – FedEx's "Carrier Pigeons", Xbox's "Lips", Skittles' "Pinata", and Got Milk?'s "White Gold Is"
- Rupert Sanders – Air Jordan's "Clock Tower"

=== Frank Capra Achievement Award ===
- Kim Kurumada

=== Robert B. Aldrich Service Award ===
- William M. Brady

=== Franklin J. Schaffner Achievement Award ===
- Scott Berger

=== Honorary Life Member ===
- Roger Ebert
