= 64th Directors Guild of America Awards =

- Date: January 28, 2012
- Location: Hollywood and Highland Center, Los Angeles, California
- Country: United States
- Presented by: Directors Guild of America
- Hosted by: Kelsey Grammer

Highlights
- Best Director Feature Film: The Artist – Michel Hazanavicius
- Best Director Documentary: Project Nim – James Marsh
- Website: https://www.dga.org/Awards/History/2010s/2011.aspx?value=2011

The 64th Directors Guild of America Awards, honoring the outstanding directorial achievements in films, documentary and television in 2011, were presented on January 28, 2012, at the Hollywood and Highland Center. The ceremony was hosted by Kelsey Grammer. The nominees for the feature film category were announced on January 9, 2012, the nominations for the television and commercial categories were announced on January 10, 2012, and the nominees for documentary directing were announced on January 12, 2012.

== Winners and nominees ==
=== Film ===
Feature Film

Michel Hazanavicius – The Artist

- Woody Allen – Midnight in Paris
- David Fincher – The Girl with the Dragon Tattoo
- Alexander Payne – The Descendants
- Martin Scorsese – Hugo
Documentaries

James Marsh – Project Nim

- Joe Berlinger and Bruce Sinofsky – Paradise Lost 3: Purgatory
- Steve James – The Interrupters
- Richard Press – Bill Cunningham New York
- Martin Scorsese – George Harrison: Living in the Material World

=== Television ===
Drama Series

Patty Jenkins – The Killing for "Pilot"

- Michael Cuesta – Homeland for "Pilot"
- Vince Gilligan – Breaking Bad for "Face Off"
- Tim Van Patten – Game of Thrones for "Winter Is Coming"
- Michael Waxman – Friday Night Lights for "Always"
Comedy Series

Robert B. Weide – Curb Your Enthusiasm for "Palestinian Chicken"

- Fred Savage – Modern Family for "After the Fire"
- Don Scardino – 30 Rock for "Double-Edged Sword"
- Michael Spiller – Modern Family for "Express Christmas"
- David Steinberg – Curb Your Enthusiasm for "The Divorce"
Miniseries or TV Film

Jon Cassar – The Kennedys

- Jennifer Aniston, Patty Jenkins, Alicia Keys, Demi Moore, and Penelope Spheeris – Five
- Jeff Bleckner – Beyond the Blackboard
- Stephen Gyllenhaal – Girl Fight
- Michael Stevens – Thurgood
Musical Variety

Glenn Weiss – The 65th Annual Tony Awards

- Louis J. Horvitz – 2011 Kennedy Center Honors
- Don Roy King – Saturday Night Live for "Host: Justin Timberlake"
- Don Mischer – The 83rd Annual Academy Awards
- Chuck O'Neil – The Daily Show with John Stewart for "Episode #16070"
Daytime Serials

William Ludel – General Hospital for "Intervention"

- Larry Carpenter – One Life to Live for "Erika's 40th"
- Casey Childs – All My Children for "The Send Off"
- Mike Denney – The Young and the Restless for "From the Grave"
- Scott McKinsey – General Hospital for "Forces of Nature"
- Cynthia J. Popp – The Bold and the Beautiful for "Brooke Berry"
- Angela Tessinari – All My Children for "In the Wee Small Hours..."
Reality Programs

Neil P. DeGroot – The Biggest Loser for "Episode #1115"

- Eytan Keller – The Next Iron Chef: Super Chefs for "Episode #401"
- Brian Smith – MasterChef for "Episode #201"
- J. Rupert Thompson – Fear Factor 2.0 for "Scorpion Tales"
- Bertram van Munster – The Amazing Race for "You Don't Get Paid Unless You Win?"
Children's Programs

Amy Schatz – A Child's Garden of Poetry

- John Fortenberry – Fred 2: Night of the Living Fred
- Jeffrey Hornaday – Geek Charming
- Michael Lembeck – Sharpay's Fabulous Adventure
- Patricia Riggen – Lemonade Mouth
- Damon Santostefano – Best Player

=== Commercials ===
Commercials

Noam Murro – Heineken's "Handlebar Mustache", DirecTV's "Hot House", Battlefield 3's "Is It Real?", and Volkswagens's "Pinata"

- Lance Acord – Nike's "Paint the Town" and "The Chosen", Volkswagen's "The Force", and NBA's "Sweetest Moment"
- Dante Ariola – Volkswagen's "Black Betty", Nissan's "Gas Powered Everything", and Jim Beam's "Parallels"
- Fredrik Bond – Heineken's "Date" and "The Entrance"
- Steven Miller – Cheetos' "Fort", GEICO's "Guinea Pigs" and "Sushi", Ortega's "Parking Lot", and Dos Equis' "Pommel Horse", "Pygmy" and "Speed Dating"

=== Frank Capra Achievement Award ===
- Katy Garretson

=== Franklin J. Schaffner Achievement Award ===
- Dennis W. Mazzocco

=== Honorary Life Member ===
- Edwin Sherin
