= 53rd Directors Guild of America Awards =

- Date: March 10, 2001
- Location: Hyatt Regency Century Plaza, Los Angeles, California
- Country: United States
- Presented by: Directors Guild of America
- Hosted by: Carl Reiner

Highlights
- Best Director Feature Film: Crouching Tiger, Hidden Dragon – Ang Lee
- Best Director Documentary: High School Boot Camp – Charles Braverman
- Website: https://www.dga.org/Awards/History/2000s/2000.aspx?value=2000

The 53rd Directors Guild of America Awards, honoring the outstanding directorial achievements in films, documentary and television in 2000, were presented on March 10, 2001, at the Hyatt Regency Century Plaza. The ceremony was hosted by Carl Reiner. The nominees in the feature film category were announced on January 22, 2001 and the other nominations were announced starting on February 1, 2001.

== Winners and nominees ==
=== Film ===
Feature Film

Ang Lee – Crouching Tiger, Hidden Dragon

- Cameron Crowe – Almost Famous
- Ridley Scott – Gladiator
- Steven Soderbergh – Erin Brockovich
- Steven Soderbergh – Traffic
Documentaries

Charles Braverman – High School Boot Camp

- Laurie Collyer – Nuyorican Dream
- Mark Lewis – The Natural History of the Chicken
- Michael Mierendorf – Broken Child
- David de Vries – The True Story of the Bridge on the River Kwai

=== Television ===
Drama Series

Thomas Schlamme – The West Wing for "Noël"

- Paris Barclay – The West Wing for "The Portland Trip"
- Henry J. Bronchtein – The Sopranos for "From Where to Eternity"
- Allen Coulter – The Sopranos for "The Knight in White Satin Armor"
- John Patterson – The Sopranos for "Funhouse"
Comedy Series

James Burrows – Will & Grace for "Lows in the Mid-Eighties"

- Allen Coulter – Sex and the City for "Cock-a-Doodle-Do"
- Bill D'Elia – Ally McBeal for "The Last Virgin"
- Pamela Fryman – Frasier for "And the Dish Ran Away with the Spoon"
- Todd Holland – Malcolm in the Middle for "Pilot"
Miniseries or TV Film

Jeff Bleckner – The Beach Boys: An American Family

- Kirk Browning – Death of a Salesman
- Martha Coolidge – If These Walls Could Talk 2 for "1972"
- Stephen Frears and Martin Pasetta – Fail Safe
- Joseph Sargent – For Love or Country: The Arturo Sandoval Story
Musical Variety

Beth McCarthy-Miller – Saturday Night Live for "Host: Val Kilmer"

- Ellen Brown – The Tonight Show with Jay Leno for "Episode #1938"
- Jerry Foley – Late Show with David Letterman for "Episode #1527"
- Roger Goodman – ABC 2000 Today
- Louis J. Horvitz – The 72nd Annual Academy Awards
Daytime Serials

Jill Mitwell – One Life to Live for "Episode #8205"

- Bruce S. Barry – Guiding Light for "Episode #13562"
- Casey Childs – All My Children for "Episode #7919"
- Conal O'Brien – All My Children for "Episode #7969"
- JoAnne Sedwick – Guiding Light for "Episode #13511"
Children's Programs

Greg Beeman – Miracle in Lane 2

- William Dear – The Wonderful World of Disney for "Santa Who?"
- Paul Hoen – Even Stevens for "Take My Sister...Please"
- Kevin Hooks – The Color of Friendship
- Sean McNamara – Even Stevens for "Easy Way"

=== Commercials ===
Commercials

Leslie Dektor – Idea Exchange's "New Eyes" and "The Run Home", and Pocketcards's "The Check"

- Dante Ariola – Nike's "Elephant" and Hewlett-Packard's "Tickets" and "Taxi"
- Bryan Buckley – FedEx' "Action Figures" and E-Trade's "Monkey", "Wazoo" and "Basketball"
- David Cornell – Visa's "Synchronized Commercialism", "Tattoo" and "I Enjoy Being a Girl", and Charles Schwab's "Ringo" and "Retirement"
- Lenard Dorfman – IBM's "Harlem Fencer" and "Senegal Women's Basketball", and Excite's "Camped"

=== Robert B. Aldrich Service Award ===
- Robert Butler
- Tom Donovan

=== Franklin J. Schaffner Achievement Award ===
- Robert N. Van Ry

=== Presidents Award ===
- Robert Wise

=== Honorary Life Member ===
- Jack Valenti
