= 51st Directors Guild of America Awards =

- Date: March 6, 1999
- Location: Hyatt Regency Century Plaza, Los Angeles, California
- Country: United States
- Presented by: Directors Guild of America

Highlights
- Best Director Feature Film: Saving Private Ryan – Steven Spielberg
- Best Director Documentary: Vietnam, Long Time Coming – Jerry Blumenthal, Peter Gilbert and Gordon Quinn
- Website: https://www.dga.org/Awards/History/1990s/1998.aspx?value=1998

The 51st Directors Guild of America Awards, honoring the outstanding directorial achievements in films, documentary and television in 1998, were presented on March 6, 1999 at the Hyatt Regency Century Plaza. The nominees in the feature film category were announced on January 25, 1999 and the other nominations were announced starting on February 1, 1999.

== Winners and nominees ==
=== Film ===
Feature Film

Steven Spielberg – Saving Private Ryan

- Roberto Benigni – Life Is Beautiful
- John Madden – Shakespeare in Love
- Terrence Malick – The Thin Red Line
- Peter Weir – The Truman Show
Documentaries

Jerry Blumenthal, Peter Gilbert and Gordon Quinn – Vietnam, Long Time Coming

- Matthew Diamond – Dancemaker
- Susan Lacy – American Masters for "Leonard Bernstein: Reaching for the Note"
- Nigel Noble – Great Performances for "Porgy and Bess: An American Voice"
- Kyra Thompson – Dying to Tell the Story

=== Television ===
Drama Series

Paris Barclay – NYPD Blue for "Hearts and Souls"

- Steve Buscemi – Homicide: Life on the Street for "Finnegan's Wake"
- Chris Carter – The X-Files for "Triangle"
- Adam Davidson – Law & Order for "Under the Influence"
- Mark Tinker – NYPD Blue for "Danny Boy"
Comedy Series

Thomas Schlamme – Sports Night for "Pilot"

- James Burrows – Will & Grace for "Pilot"
- Pamela Fryman – Just Shoot Me! for "Two Girls for Every Boy"
- Kelsey Grammer – Frasier for "Merry Christmas, Mrs. Moskowitz"
- Todd Holland – The Larry Sanders Show for "Flip"
Miniseries or TV Film

Michael Cristofer – Gia

- Allan Arkush – The Temptations
- Steve Barron – Merlin
- Rob Cohen – The Rat Pack
- Jon Turteltaub – From the Earth to the Moon for "That's All There Is"
Musical Variety

Paul Miller – The 52nd Annual Tony Awards

- Marty Callner – I'm Telling You for the Last Time
- Matthew Diamond – In Performance at the White House for "Savion Glover – Stomp, Slide & Swing"
- Jerry Foley – Late Show with David Letterman for "Episode #958"
- Louis J. Horvitz – The 70th Annual Academy Awards
Daytime Serials

James Sayegh – One Life to Live for "Episode #7572"

- Joseph Behar – General Hospital for "Episode #2580"
- Nancy Eckels – The Bold and the Beautiful for "Episode #2942"
- Sally McDonald – The Young and the Restless for "Episode #6437"
- Jill Mitwell – One Life to Live for "Episode #7761"
Children's Programs

Mitchell Kriegman – Bear in the Big Blue House for "Love is All You Need"

- Allison Grodner – The Teen Files for "Smoking: Truth or Dare"
- Victoria Hochberg – Honey, I Shrunk the Kids for "From Honey with Love"
- Stuart Margolin – The Sweetest Gift
- Ron Oliver – Goosebumps for "Cry of the Cat"

=== Commercials ===
Commercials

Kinka Usher – Sony's "Egg", Mountain Dew's "Michael Johnson's World", Miller Brewing's "Cupid", Nike's "Undercover Ushers", and Hallmark's "Neighbor Lady"

- Amy Hill and Chris Riess – Saturn's "Driving Range", Bronson Medical Centers' "Pediatrics", AmSouth's "Life", and Long John Silver's' "London Loves Us"
- Peter Darley Miller – 360 Communications' "Chase", Slice's "Dissection", Midway Games' "Target Practice", PlayStation's "Scout", and Nike's "The Great Magician"
- Rocky Morton – Taco Bell's "Bobbing Head" and "Romeo and Juliet", Fox Sports' "Feet", and PlayStation's "Laundromat"
- Tarsem Singh – John Hancock Financial's "Sarajevo", Miller Brewing's "Séance" and "Dances with Dog", and Beck's' "Romance"

=== Lifetime Achievement in News Direction ===
- Richard B. Armstrong

=== Frank Capra Achievement Award ===
- Tom Joyner

=== Robert B. Aldrich Service Award ===
- Arthur Hiller

=== Franklin J. Schaffner Achievement Award ===
- Robert Caminiti

=== Diversity Award ===
- Steven Bochco
