= 52nd Directors Guild of America Awards =

- Date: March 11, 2000
- Location: Hyatt Regency Century Plaza, Los Angeles, California
- Country: United States
- Presented by: Directors Guild of America
- Hosted by: Carl Reiner

Highlights
- Best Director Feature Film: American Beauty – Sam Mendes
- Best Director Documentary: On the Ropes – Nanette Burstein and Brett Morgen
- Website: https://www.dga.org/Awards/History/1990s/1999.aspx?value=1999

The 52nd Directors Guild of America Awards, honoring the outstanding directorial achievements in films, documentary and television in 1999, were presented on March 11, 2000 at the Hyatt Regency Century Plaza. The ceremony was hosted by Carl Reiner. The nominees in the feature film category were announced on January 24, 2000 and the other nominations were announced starting on February 1, 2000.

== Winners and nominees ==
=== Film ===
Feature Film

Sam Mendes – American Beauty

- Frank Darabont – The Green Mile
- Spike Jonze – Being John Malkovich
- Michael Mann – The Insider
- M. Night Shyamalan – The Sixth Sense
Documentaries

Nanette Burstein and Brett Morgen – On the Ropes

- Barry W. Blaustein – Beyond the Mat
- Marc Levin – Thug Life in D.C.
- Errol Morris – Mr. Death: The Rise and Fall of Fred A. Leuchter, Jr.
- Gary Weimberg – The Double Life of Ernesto Gomez-Gomez

=== Television ===
Drama Series

David Chase – The Sopranos for "Pilot"

- Daniel Attias – The Sopranos for "46 Long"
- Henry J. Bronchtein – The Sopranos for "Nobody Knows Anything"
- Allen Coulter – The Sopranos for "College"
- Thomas Schlamme – The West Wing for "Pilot"
Comedy Series

Thomas Schlamme – Sports Night for "Small Town"

- James Burrows – Will & Grace for "Yours, Mine or Ours"
- Pamela Fryman – Frasier for "The Fight Before Christmas"
- Katy Garretson – Frasier for "Dr. Nora"
- Victoria Hochberg – Sex and the City for "The Man, the Myth, the Viagra"
Miniseries or TV Film

Mick Jackson – Tuesdays with Morrie

- Martyn Burke – Pirates of Silicon Valley
- Martha Coolidge – Introducing Dorothy Dandridge
- Daniel Petrie – Inherit the Wind
- Joseph Sargent – A Lesson Before Dying
Musical Variety

Dennie Gordon – Tracey Takes On... for "The End of the World"

- Jerry Foley – Late Show with David Letterman for "Episode #1294"
- Louis J. Horvitz – The 71st Annual Academy Awards
- Rob Marshall – Annie
- Beth McCarthy-Miller – Saturday Night Live: 25th Anniversary
Daytime Serials

Herbert Stein – Days of Our Lives for "Episode #8557"

- Albert Alarr – Port Charles for "Episode #619"
- Kathryn Foster – The Young and the Restless for "Episode #6787"
- Noel Maxam – The Young and the Restless for "Episode #6632"
- Jill Mitwell – One Life to Live for "Episode #8012"
Children's Programs

Amy Schatz – Goodnight Moon and Other Sleepy Time Tales

- Mitchell Kriegman – Bear in the Big Blue House for "A Berry Merry Christmas"
- Bruce Leddy – CinderElmo
- Randall Miller – The Wonderful World of Disney for "H-E Double Hockey Sticks"
- Jonathan Winfrey – Cousin Skeeter for "Dirty Laundry"

=== Commercials ===
Commercials

Bryan Buckley – Monster.com's "When I Grow Up", E-Trade's "TriMount Studios" and "Broker", and OnHealth.com's "Friends"

- Adam Cameron and Simon Cole – Frito-Lay's "Sizes", Church's Chicken's "Fire 2", Adidas' "El Duque Dance", Amazon's "Two Minutes", Dreyer's' "Truck Driver", and Snapple's "Sponsor"
- Leslie Dektor – Coca-Cola's "Downhill Racer", e.Score.com's "The Debate", and Allstate's "Anthem"
- Rocky Morton – Lexus' "Fly", Homestead's "Comb" and "Stick", and The Minus Man's "Promo"
- Dewey Nicks – Ameritrade's "Let’s Light this Candle", "I Just Want to be Held" and "Square Dance", and Union Bay's "Rocket Man"

=== Lifetime Achievement in Feature Film ===
- Steven Spielberg

=== Lifetime Achievement in Sports Direction ===
- Chet Forte

=== Frank Capra Achievement Award ===
- Cheryl R. Downey

=== Franklin J. Schaffner Achievement Award ===
- Scott L. Rindenow

=== Diversity Award ===
- HBO
