= 55th Directors Guild of America Awards =

- Date: March 1, 2003
- Location: Hyatt Regency Century Plaza, Los Angeles, California
- Country: United States
- Presented by: Directors Guild of America
- Hosted by: Carl Reiner

Highlights
- Best Director Feature Film: Chicago – Rob Marshall
- Best Director Documentary: The Smith Family – Tasha Oldham
- Website: https://www.dga.org/Awards/History/2000s/2002.aspx?value=2002

The 55th Directors Guild of America Awards, honoring the outstanding directorial achievements in films, documentary and television in 2002, were presented on March 1, 2003 at the Hyatt Regency Century Plaza. The ceremony was hosted by Carl Reiner. The nominees in the feature film category were announced on January 21, 2003 and the other nominations were announced starting on January 30, 2003.

== Winners and nominees ==
=== Film ===
Feature Film

Rob Marshall – Chicago

- Stephen Daldry – The Hours
- Peter Jackson – The Lord of the Rings: The Two Towers
- Roman Polanski – The Pianist
- Martin Scorsese – Gangs of New York
Documentaries

Tasha Oldham – The Smith Family

- Charles Braverman – Bottom of the Ninth
- Rebecca Cammisa and Rob Fruchtman – Sister Helen
- Malcolm Clarke and Stuart Sender – Prisoner of Paradise
- Leah Mahan – Sweet Old Song

=== Television ===
Drama Series

John Patterson – The Sopranos for "Whitecaps"

- Daniel Attias – Six Feet Under for "Back to the Garden"
- Paris Barclay – The West Wing for "Debate Camp"
- Alex Graves – The West Wing for "Posse Comitatus"
- Tim Van Patten – The Sopranos for "Whoever Did This"
Comedy Series

Bryan Gordon – Curb Your Enthusiasm for "The Special Section"

- James Burrows – Will & Grace for "Marry Me a Little"
- Larry Charles – Curb Your Enthusiasm for "The Nanny from Hell"
- Michael Patrick King – Sex and the City for "Plus One is the Loneliest Number"
- David Steinberg – Curb Your Enthusiasm for "Mary, Joseph, and Larry"
Miniseries or TV Film

Mick Jackson – Live from Baghdad

- Julie Dash – The Rosa Parks Story
- Howard Deutch – Gleason
- John Frankenheimer – Path to War
- Richard Loncraine – The Gathering Storm
Musical Variety

Matthew Diamond – From Broadway: Fosse

- Marty Callner – Robin Williams: Live On Broadway
- Jerry Foley – Late Show with David Letterman for "Episode #1876"
- Louis J. Horvitz – The 74th Annual Academy Awards
- Glenn Weiss – The 56th Annual Tony Awards
Daytime Serials

Scott McKinsey – Port Charles for "Episode #1433"

- Larry Carpenter – One Life to Live for "Episode #8655"
- Jill Mitwell – One Life to Live for "Episode #8691"
- Michael Stich – The Bold and the Beautiful for "Episode #3948"
- Frank Valentini – One Life to Live for "Episode #8656"
Children's Programs

Guy Ferland – Bang Bang You're Dead

- Greg Beeman – A Ring of Endless Light
- Thom Eberhardt – I Was a Teenage Faust
- Gregory Hobson – Even Stevens for "Band on the Roof"
- Amy Schatz – Through a Child's Eyes: September 11, 2001

=== Commercials ===
Commercials

Baker Smith – Canal+'s "Black Bands" and "Visigoths", Fox Sports' "Lightning" and "Wind", and BMW's "Clown"

- Dante Ariola – PlayStation 2's "Signs", Lee's "Cheese", and Bank of America's "Butcher"
- Leslie Dektor – American Express' "Crazy Love", America's Second Harvest's "Rent or Food", and Verizon's "Lady Liberty"
- Craig Gillespie – Citibank's "Treadmill", Holiday Inn Express' "Snake Bite", Chevrolet's "Cops", SBC's "Coffee Machine", and EDS's "Suki"
- Noam Murro – Saturn's "Sheet Metal", eBay's "Do It eBay", and E-Trade's "Pick" and "Pitch"

=== Lifetime Achievement in Feature Film ===
- Martin Scorsese

=== Frank Capra Achievement Award ===
- Yudi Bennett

=== Robert B. Aldrich Service Award ===
- Jud Taylor

=== Franklin J. Schaffner Achievement Award ===
- Esperanza Martinez

=== Honorary Life Member ===
- John Rich
