= 65th Directors Guild of America Awards =

- Date: February 2, 2013
- Location: Hollywood and Highland Center, Los Angeles, California
- Country: United States
- Presented by: Directors Guild of America
- Hosted by: Kelsey Grammer

Highlights
- Best Director Feature Film: Argo – Ben Affleck
- Best Director Documentary: Searching for Sugar Man – Malik Bendjelloul
- Website: https://www.dga.org/Awards/History/2010s/2012.aspx?value=2012

The 65th Directors Guild of America Awards, honoring the outstanding directorial achievements in films, documentary and television in 2012, were presented on February 2, 2013, at the Hollywood and Highland Center. The ceremony was hosted by Kelsey Grammer for the second time. The nominees for the feature film category were announced on January 8, 2013, the nominations for the television and commercial categories were announced on January 9, 2013, and the nominees for documentary directing were announced on January 14, 2013.

== Winners and nominees ==
=== Film ===
Feature Film

Ben Affleck – Argo

- Kathryn Bigelow – Zero Dark Thirty
- Tom Hooper – Les Misérables
- Ang Lee – Life of Pi
- Steven Spielberg – Lincoln
Documentaries

Malik Bendjelloul – Searching for Sugar Man

- Kirby Dick – The Invisible War
- David France – How to Survive a Plague
- Lauren Greenfield – The Queen of Versailles
- Alison Klayman – Ai Weiwei: Never Sorry

=== Television ===
Drama Series

Rian Johnson – Breaking Bad for "Fifty-One"

- Michael Cuesta – Homeland for "The Choice"
- Jennifer Getzinger – Mad Men for "A Little Kiss"
- Lesli Linka Glatter – Homeland for "Q&A"
- Greg Mottola – The Newsroom for "We Just Decided To"
Comedy Series

Lena Dunham – Girls for "Pilot"

- Louis C.K. – Louie for "New Year's Eve"
- Mark Cendrowski – The Big Bang Theory for "The Date Night Variable"
- Bryan Cranston – Modern Family for "Election Day"
- Beth McCarthy-Miller – 30 Rock for "Live from Studio 6H"
Miniseries or TV Film

Jay Roach – Game Change

- Greg Berlanti – Political Animals for "Pilot"
- Philip Kaufman – Hemingway & Gellhorn
- Kevin Reynolds – Hatfields & McCoys
- Michael Rymer – American Horror Story: Asylum for "Dark Cousin"
Musical Variety

Glenn Weiss – The 66th Annual Tony Awards

- Michael Dempsey – 12-12-12: The Concert for Sandy Relief
- Don Roy King – Saturday Night Live for "Host: Mick Jagger"
- Don Mischer – The 84th Annual Academy Awards
- Chuck O'Neil – The Daily Show with John Stewart for "Episode #17153"
Daytime Serials

Jill Mitwell – One Life to Live for "Between Heaven and Hell"

- Albert Alarr – Days of Our Lives for "Trapped"
- Larry Carpenter – General Hospital for "Bad Water"
- William Ludel – General Hospital for "Magic Milo"
- Scott McKinsey – General Hospital for "Shot Through The Heart"
Reality Programs

Brian Smith – MasterChef for "Episode #305"

- Tony Croll – America's Next Top Model for "The Girl Who Becomes America's Next Top Model"
- Peter Ney – Face Off for "Scene of the Crime"
- J. Rupert Thompson – Stars Earn Stripes for "Amphibious Assault"
- Tim Warren – Ink Master for "Episode 103"
Children's Programs

Paul Hoen – Let It Shine

- Stuart Gillard – Girl vs. Monster
- Savage Steve Holland – Big Time Movie
- Jonathan Judge – Fred 3: Camp Fred
- Amy Schatz – Don't Divorce Me! Kids' Rules for Parents on Divorce

=== Commercials ===
Commercials

Alejandro González Iñárritu – Procter & Gamble's "Best Job"

- Lance Acord – Nike's "Jogger" and "Greatness", Volkswagen's "The Dog Strikes Back", and Levi's' "Thread"
- Steve Ayson – Carlton Draught's "Beer Chase"
- Fredrik Bond – Puma's "Surfer" and Budweiser's "Eternal Optimism"
- Tom Kuntz – Old Spice's "Terry Crews Muscle Music" and DirecTV's "Stray Animals", "Roadside Ditch" and "Platoon"

=== Lifetime Achievement in Feature Film ===
- Miloš Forman

=== Lifetime Achievement in News Direction ===
- Eric Shapiro

=== Frank Capra Achievement Award ===
- Susan Zwerman

=== Robert B. Aldrich Service Award ===
- Michael Apted

=== Franklin J. Schaffner Achievement Award ===
- Dency Nelson
