= Jamie Howarth =

- Born: Philadelphia
- Occupations: Television, film, composer, songwriter, audio engineer, music industry

Jamie Howarth is an American television and film composer and musical director. Howarth owns and operates a multi-Grammy winning archive and restoration business which restores master tapes - Plangent Processes. One of its more notable restorations was the Woody Guthrie LiveWire - a 1949 concert which is the only known live recording of Guthrie prior to his illness. The project was awarded a Grammy for Best Historical Recording.

Howarth was born in New Jersey, and, as of 2002, resides in Nantucket. He lived in New York City, New York, in the eighties and nineties, during which period he worked at various media facilities including the Hit Factory, ABC-TV, and AudioTechniques.

== Awards and nominations ==
He has been nominated for four Daytime Emmy awards for his work on "One Life to Live", and won three times; twice in 2000 for Outstanding Achievement in Music Direction and Composition for a Drama Series and Outstanding Achievement in Live & Direct to Tape Sound Mixing for a Drama Series, and once in 2001 for Outstanding Achievement in Live & Direct to Tape Sound Mixing for a Drama Series. His nomination in 1995 was for Outstanding Drama Series Directing Team. He also won a Directors Guild of America award in 2000, for Outstanding Directorial Achievement in Daytime Serials, for his work on "One Life to Live".

His first Daytime Emmy nomination was shared with Jill Mitwell, Peter Miner, David Pressman, Lonny Price, Gary Tomlin, Frank Valentini, Jim McDonald, Tracy Casper Lang, Mary Kelly Rodden, and James Sayegh. His first win was shared with Paul Glass, David Nichtern, Dominic Messinger, Kevin Bents, Lee Holdridge, Bette Sussman, and Rob Mounsey. His Directors Guild of America win was shared with Jill Mitwell, Owen Renfroe, Alan P. Needleman, Richard A. Manfredi, and Teresa Anne Cicala.

Howarth's company, Plangent Processes, has been nominated for 3 Grammy Awards, including Erroll Garner's Concert by the Sea and 2 wins for The Rolling Stones "Charley is My Darling" and for Best Historical Album in 2008, for their restoration of The Live Wire, a recorded live performance by Woody Guthrie, in 1949. Plangent Processes has also restored master tapes for Bruce Springsteen, Queen, Grateful Dead, the Neil Young Archives, Doc Watson, Tim Buckley, Pete Seeger, and the Andy Warhol estate, among others. Film soundtrack restoration for From Here to Eternity, Close Encounters of the Third Kind, Cabaret, Camelot and West Side Story among others.

== Credits ==
- One Life to Live (music director and mixer, 1999–2001)
- Threat of Exposure (composer, 2002)
- Silence (composer, 2003)
