= Bruce Barry =

Bruce Barry may refer to:

- Bruce S. Barry, American television soap opera director and writer
- Bruce Barry (actor) (1934–2017), Australian actor and singer
