= 44th Directors Guild of America Awards =

- Date: March 14, 1992
- Location: The Beverly Hilton, Los Angeles, California; United Nations, New York City
- Country: United States
- Presented by: Directors Guild of America
- Hosted by: Carl Reiner (Los Angeles); Mario Van Peebles (New York)

Highlights
- Best Director Feature Film: The Silence of the Lambs – Jonathan Demme
- Best Director Documentary: American Dream – Barbara Kopple
- Website: https://www.dga.org/Awards/History/1990s/1991.aspx?value=1991

The 44th Directors Guild of America Awards, honoring the outstanding directorial achievements in films, documentary and television in 1991, were presented on March 14, 1992 at the Beverly Hilton and the United Nations. The ceremony in Beverly Hills was hosted by Carl Reiner and the ceremony in New York was hosted by Mario Van Peebles. The feature film nominees were announced on January 28, 1992, commercial nominees were announced in February, and nominees in six television categories were announced on March 1, 1992.

== Winners and nominees ==
=== Film ===
Feature Film

Jonathan Demme – The Silence of the Lambs

- Barry Levinson – Bugsy
- Ridley Scott – Thelma and Louise
- Oliver Stone – JFK
- Barbra Streisand – The Prince of Tides
Documentaries

Barbara Kopple – American Dream

- Eleanor Coppola, Fax Bahr, and George Hickenlooper – Hearts of Darkness: A Filmmaker's Apocalypse
- Albert Maysles, Bob Eisenhardt, Susan Froemke, and Peter Gelb – Soldiers of Music: Rostropovich Returns to Russia
- Alan Raymond – Doing Time: Life Inside the Big House

=== Television ===
Drama Series

Eric Laneuville – I'll Fly Away for "All God's Children"

- James Hayman – Northern Exposure for "Jules & Joel"
- Stuart Margolin – Northern Exposure for "Goodbye To All That"
Comedy Series

Peter Bonerz – Murphy Brown for "Uh-Oh: Part 2"

- James Burrows – Cheers for "Days of Wine & Neurosis"
- David Steinberg – Seinfeld for "The Tape"
Miniseries or TV Film

Stephen Gyllenhaal – Paris Trout

- Joshua Brand – I'll Fly Away for "Pilot"
- Brian Gibson – The Josephine Baker Story
Musical Variety

Walter C. Miller – The 45th Annual Tony Awards

- Hal Gurnee – Late Night with David Letterman
- Jeff Margolis – The 63rd Annual Academy Awards
Daytime Serials

Michael Stich – The Bold and the Beautiful for "Episode #1103"

- Mike Denney – The Young and the Restless for "Episode #4708"
- Heather Hill – The Young and the Restless for "Episode #4730"
Daytime Drama

Roy Campanella II – WonderWorks for "Brother Future"

- Consuelo Gonzalez – ABC Afterschool Special for "In the Shadow of Love"
- Barra Grant – CBS Schoolbreak Special for "Lies of the Heart"

=== Commercials ===
Commercials

Joe Pytka – Hallmark Cards' "Dance Card" and Nike's "The Bo Show"

- Leslie Dektor – Bell Atlantic's "Joanne", Saturn's "Petersburg", and Tele-Communications Inc.'s "Taxi Driver"
- James Gartner – FedEx' "Adoption" and HBO's "Party"
- Stephen Kessler – MasterCard's "Directions", Tony's Pizza's "House", MCI Communications' "Joe College", Giant Eagle's "Romeo & Julie" and "Tea Time", and Jack in the Box' "Trapeze Act"
- Domenic Mastrippolito – AIDS Project Los Angeles' "Talk About It"

=== D.W. Griffith Award ===
- Akira Kurosawa

=== Lifetime Achievement in Sports Direction ===
- Edward T. Nathanson

=== Robert B. Aldrich Service Award ===
- Jack Shea

=== Franklin J. Schaffner Achievement Award ===
- Marilyn Jacobs-Furey

=== Honorary Life Member ===
- Charles Champlin
