= 14th Directors Guild of America Awards =

- Date: 1962
- Country: United States
- Presented by: Directors Guild of America

Highlights
- Best Director Feature Film: West Side Story – Jerome Robbins and Robert Wise
- Best Director Television: Ernie Kovacs Special – Ernie Kovacs and Joseph Behar
- Website: https://www.dga.org/Awards/History/1960s/1961.aspx?value=1961

The 14th Directors Guild of America Awards, honoring the outstanding directorial achievements in film and television in 1961, were presented in 1962.

== Winners and nominees ==
=== Film ===
Feature Film

Jerome Robbins and Robert Wise – West Side Story

- Marlon Brando – One-Eyed Jacks
- Frank Capra – Pocketful of Miracles
- Jack Clayton – The Innocents
- Blake Edwards – Breakfast at Tiffany's
- Peter Glenville – Summer and Smoke
- John Huston – The Misfits
- Elia Kazan – Splendor in the Grass
- Henry Koster – Flower Drum Song
- Stanley Kramer – Judgment at Nuremberg
- Philip Leacock – Hand in Hand
- Mervyn LeRoy – A Majority of One
- Joshua Logan – Fanny
- Anthony Mann – El Cid
- Robert Mulligan – The Great Impostor
- Daniel Petrie – A Raisin in the Sun
- Robert Rossen – The Hustler
- Robert Stevenson – The Absent-Minded Professor
- J. Lee Thompson – The Guns of Navarone
- Peter Ustinov – Romanoff and Juliet
- William Wyler – The Children's Hour

=== Television ===
Television

Ernie Kovacs and Joseph Behar – Ernie Kovacs Special

- Marc Daniels – The Power and the Glory
- Ralph Nelson – The Dick Powell Show for "Doyle Against the House"
- George Schaefer – Hallmark Hall of Fame for "Victoria Regina"
- Bud Yorkin – Danny Goes it Alone

=== Honorary Life Member ===
- Hobe Morrison
