= Georgina Tucker =

American hotel food coordinator (1911-2014)

Georgina P. Tucker (January 14, 1911–October 25, 2014) was a hospitality and home economics executive for Western International Hotels in the 1960s and 1970s. She published the book The Professional Housekeeper (1975), a text used in professional hospitality training programs.

== Hospitality career ==
Georgina Tucker was born in Hanford, Washington, on January 14, 1911. She graduated with a degree in home economics from Washington State University, and started working at Western Hotels in a training program at the Roosevelt Hotel in Seattle, Washington. After seven years of her career, she got married and took time off from her career. She moved from Washington to Boise, Idaho, where she worked in a hotel.

=== Western Hotels executive role and other hospitality work ===
Tucker returned to Western International Hotels to work in food research and was named assistant director of foods and beverages in 1959. She lived in Seattle but traveled extensively in the role, as international consultant to the company's more than 45 hotels worldwide, including in Japan, Switzerland, Mexico City, and Australia. Tucker spent about half her time visiting hotels.

In 1962, Tucker worked with Edward Carlson to produce the Seattle Worlds Fair. She organized the food, menus, personnel and workflow of the Space Needle upon its opening in 1962, and was among the first women to visit the top. With the Davenport Hotel of Spokane, she organized food service for the 1965 National Girl Scout Roundup in Farragut, Idaho. She performed additional work including disaster food planning for the American Red Cross, food management for a naval base, holding parties for homemakers to develop ideas, and hospitality planning for large corporations including the Boeing Airplane Company. She also had a stint in hospitality at the Rhodes Department Store, and during World War II joined a United States government study on the effects of food on the aging.

=== Century Plaza Hotel in Los Angeles ===
In 1966, Tucker began a role as director of housekeeping for the new Century Plaza Hotel in Los Angeles, supervising the hotel's largest single department and leading a staff of 185. In 1971, Western International Hotels selected her for the annual Thurston–Dupar Award, a prize for one employee. In Los Angeles, Tucker was one of the directors of the local chapter of the National Executive Housekeepers Association, and was named vice president and later the president of the Beverly Hills and Century City chapter of Soroptimist International.

Upon her retirement, Tucker lived at Channing House in Palo Alto, California.

== Bibliography ==
Tucker authored two textbooks, The Science of Housekeeping (1970) and The Professional Housekeeper (1975), which have been used as reference texts in hospitality training programs.

- The Science of Housekeeping (1970), ISBN 9780843605778
- The Professional Housekeeper (1975), ISBN 9780843605914
