= Glenn Weiss =

American producer and director

Glenn Weiss is an American producer and director of television and live events. He has won 14 Emmy Awards and eight Directors Guild of America awards as a director and producer for various awards shows and reality shows including the Tony Awards, Kennedy Center Honors, and Academy Awards. As of 2026, he is the director of the Academy Awards, Golden Globe Awards and Primetime Emmy Awards.

== Early life ==
Weiss was raised in a Jewish family. He graduated from the University of Maryland in 1983.

== Career ==
Weiss started his career working at the Washington, D.C., bureau of CNN while still a full-time University of Maryland student before becoming a producer and director at Fox affiliate WTTG. His first national credit was America's Most Wanted, followed by other shows including Studs, Legends of the Hidden Temple, Gladiators 2000, and talk shows hosted by Jane Pratt and Tempestt Bledsoe in the years since.

As of 2018, Weiss has won 14 Emmy Awards, and, as of 2015, five Directors Guild of America Awards for Outstanding Directorial Achievement, and has been nominated for Producers Guild of America Awards.

Weiss has also directed numerous televised events, including the Tony Awards, Academy Awards, for which he has garnered three directing Primetime Emmys and has directed and produced Primetime Emmy Awards. Other directing credits include the Kennedy Center Honors, CableACE Awards, Billboard Music Awards, BET Awards, Peter Pan Live!, The SpongeBob Musical: Live On Stage!, Nickelodeon Kids' Choice Awards, Dick Clark's New Year's Rockin' Eve, the Primetime Emmy Awards, Live from Lincoln Center, and the American Music Awards. He also directed the 2020 DNC.

Among the Academy Awards ceremonies that Weiss was the director of was the 94th Academy Awards. According to executive Rob Mills in a Variety article referring to the Chris Rock–Will Smith slapping incident,

One quick shout out I want to give is to the director Glenn Weiss. I was in the truck with him in our control room on New Year’s Eve when Mariah Carey was having some vocal issues singing. I was with him when [at the 89th Academy Awards] they did the wrong envelope on ‘La La Land’ and I was with him last night. And there is nobody who keeps a cooler head and just keeps the show moving along. While obviously, knowing exactly what's happening. He really is the best in these situations.

== Personal life ==
During the 70th Primetime Emmy Awards on September 18th, 2018, Weiss made headlines by proposing to long-time girlfriend Jan Svendsen during his acceptance speech for Outstanding Directing for a Variety Special for his work on that year's Academy Awards. He proposed by saying, "You wonder why I don’t like to call you my girlfriend? Because I want to call you my wife." The ring previously belonged to his mother, who had died two and a half weeks prior. The moment was widely shared on social media platforms Twitter and Instagram. They got married on 14 February 2023, with Speaker Emerita Nancy Pelosi officiating.

== Awards ==
Award	Year	Category	Work	Result
Daytime Emmy Awards	2000	Outstanding Special Class Directing	Jerry Lewis MDA Labor Day Telethon	Nominated
Daytime Emmy Awards	2000	Directing in a Talk Show/Morning Program	Donny & Marie	Nominated
Daytime Emmy Awards	2006	Outstanding Special Class Directing	The Thanksgiving Day Parade on CBS	Nominated
Daytime Emmy Awards	2007	Outstanding Special Class Directing	The Thanksgiving Day Parade on CBS	Nominated
Daytime Emmy Awards	2008	Outstanding Special Class Directing	The Thanksgiving Day Parade on CBS	Nominated
Directors Guild of America Awards	2002	Musical Variety	The 55th Annual Tony Awards	Nominated
Directors Guild of America Awards	2003	Musical Variety	The 56th Annual Tony Awards	Nominated
Directors Guild of America Awards	2006	Musical Variety	The 59th Annual Tony Awards	Nominated
Directors Guild of America Awards	2007	Musical Variety	The 60th Annual Tony Awards	Nominated
Directors Guild of America Awards	2008	Musical Variety	The 61st Annual Tony Awards	Won
Directors Guild of America Awards	2009	Musical Variety	The 62nd Annual Tony Awards	Nominated
Directors Guild of America Awards	2011	Musical Variety	The 64th Annual Tony Awards	Won
Directors Guild of America Awards	2012	Musical Variety	The 65th Annual Tony Awards	Won
Directors Guild of America Awards	2013	Musical Variety	The 66th Annual Tony Awards	Won
Directors Guild of America Awards	2014	Variety/Talk/News/Sports – Specials	The 67th Annual Tony Awards	Won
Directors Guild of America Awards	2015	Variety/Talk/News/Sports – Specials	The 68th Annual Tony Awards	Won
Directors Guild of America Awards	2017	Variety/Talk/News/Sports – Specials	The 70th Annual Tony Awards	Won
Directors Guild of America Awards	2018	Variety/Talk/News/Sports – Specials	The 89th Annual Academy Awards	Won
Directors Guild of America Awards	2019	Variety/Talk/News/Sports – Specials	The 72nd Annual Tony Awards	Nominated
Directors Guild of America Awards	2020	Variety/Talk/News/Sports – Specials	The 91st Annual Academy Awards	Nominated
Directors Guild of America Awards	2022	Variety/Talk/News/Sports – Specials	The 43rd Annual Kennedy Center Honors	Nominated
Directors Guild of America Awards	2023	Variety/Talk/News/Sports – Specials	The 75th Annual Tony Awards	Won
Directors Guild of America Awards	2024	Variety/Talk/News/Sports – Specials	The 95th Annual Academy Awards	Nominated
Directors Guild of America Awards	2025	Variety/Talk/News/Sports – Specials	The 77th Annual Tony Awards	Nominated
Primetime Emmy Awards	2003	Outstanding Directing for a Variety Series	The 56th Annual Tony Awards	Won
Primetime Emmy Awards	2005	Outstanding Directing for Nonfiction Programming	The Apprentice: "Season 2 Finale"	Nominated
Primetime Emmy Awards	2007	Outstanding Variety Special (Live)	The 60th Annual Tony Awards	Won
Primetime Emmy Awards	2007	Outstanding Variety Special (Live)	Prince: Super Bowl XLI Halftime Show	Nominated
Primetime Emmy Awards	2008	Outstanding Variety Special (Live)	The 61st Annual Tony Awards	Won
Primetime Emmy Awards	2009	Outstanding Directing for a Variety Special	The Neighborhood Ball: An Inauguration Celebration	Nominated
Primetime Emmy Awards	2009	Outstanding Variety Special (Live)	The 62nd Annual Tony Awards	Nominated
Primetime Emmy Awards	2010	Outstanding Directing for a Variety Special	The 63rd Annual Tony Awards	Nominated
Primetime Emmy Awards	2010	Outstanding Variety Special (Live)	The 63rd Annual Tony Awards	Won
Primetime Emmy Awards	2011	Outstanding Directing for a Variety Special	The 64th Annual Tony Awards	Nominated
Primetime Emmy Awards	2011	Outstanding Variety Special (Live)	The 64th Annual Tony Awards	Won
Primetime Emmy Awards	2012	Outstanding Directing for a Variety Special	The 65th Annual Tony Awards	Won
Primetime Emmy Awards	2012	Outstanding Variety Special (Live)	The 65th Annual Tony Awards	Won
Primetime Emmy Awards	2013	Outstanding Directing for Nonfiction Programming	Survivor	Nominated
Primetime Emmy Awards	2013	Outstanding Directing for a Variety Special	The 66th Annual Tony Awards	Won
Primetime Emmy Awards	2014	Outstanding Directing for a Variety Special	The 67th Annual Tony Awards	Won
Primetime Emmy Awards	2014	Outstanding Variety Special (Live)	The 67th Annual Tony Awards	Won
Primetime Emmy Awards	2015	Outstanding Directing for a Variety Special	The 68th Annual Tony Awards	Nominated
Primetime Emmy Awards	2015	Outstanding Variety Special (Live)	The 68th Annual Tony Awards	Nominated
Primetime Emmy Awards	2016	Outstanding Directing for a Variety Special	The Kennedy Center Honors	Nominated
Primetime Emmy Awards	2016	Outstanding Variety Special (Live)	The 69th Annual Tony Awards	Nominated
Primetime Emmy Awards	2017	Outstanding Directing for a Variety Special	The Oscars	Won
Primetime Emmy Awards	2017	Outstanding Variety Special (Live)	The 70th Annual Tony Awards	Won
Primetime Emmy Awards	2018	Outstanding Directing for a Variety Special	The Oscars	Won
Primetime Emmy Awards	2018	Outstanding Variety Special (Live)	Night of Too Many Stars: America Unites for Autism Programs	Nominated
Primetime Emmy Awards	2019	Outstanding Directing for a Variety Special	The Oscars	Nominated
Primetime Emmy Awards	2019	Outstanding Variety Special (Live)	The Oscars	Nominated
Primetime Emmy Awards	2019	Outstanding Variety Special (Live)	The 72nd Annual Tony Awards	Nominated
Primetime Emmy Awards	2020	Outstanding Directing for a Variety Special	The 73rd Annual Tony Awards	Nominated
Primetime Emmy Awards	2020	Outstanding Variety Special (Live)	The 73rd Annual Tony Awards	Nominated
Primetime Emmy Awards	2021	Outstanding Variety Special (Live)	Celebrating America – An Inauguration Night Special	Nominated
Primetime Emmy Awards	2022	Outstanding Variety Special (Live)	The Tony Awards Present: Broadway's Back!	Nominated
Primetime Emmy Awards	2023	Outstanding Directing for a Variety Special	The Oscars	Nominated
Primetime Emmy Awards	2023	Outstanding Variety Special (Live)	The Oscars	Nominated
Primetime Emmy Awards	2023	Outstanding Variety Special (Live)	The 75th Annual Tony Awards	Nominated
Primetime Emmy Awards	2024	Outstanding Directing for a Variety Special	The 76th Annual Tony Awards	Nominated
Primetime Emmy Awards	2024	Outstanding Variety Special (Live)	The 76th Annual Tony Awards	Nominated
Primetime Emmy Awards	2025	Outstanding Directing for a Variety Special	The 77th Annual Tony Awards	Nominated
Primetime Emmy Awards	2026	Outstanding Directing for a Variety Special	Taylor Swift | The Eras Tour | The Final Show	Nominated
Primetime Emmy Awards	2026	Outstanding Directing for a Variety Special	The 78th Annual Tony Awards	Nominated
Primetime Emmy Awards	2026	Outstanding Variety Special (Live)	The 83rd Annual Golden Globes	Nominated
Primetime Emmy Awards	2026	Outstanding Variety Special (Live)	The 78th Annual Tony Awards	Nominated
