= Kathryn Foster =

Kathryn Foster is an American soap opera producer and director. She resigned in October 2006 after being on The Young and the Restless for about 15 years.

== Positions held ==
The Young and the Restless

- Producer (2002–2006)
- Director (1989–2006)
- Associate Director (1988–1989)
- Production Associate (1986–1988)

Days of Our Lives

- Director (September 5, 2007 - September 17, 2008)

The Bold and the Beautiful

- Director (February 16 and 17, 2009)

== Awards and nominations ==
Daytime Emmy Award

- Nomination, 2006, Drama Series, The Young and the Restless
- Nomination, 2006, Directing Team, The Young and the Restless
- Nomination, 2005, Drama Series, The Young and the Restless
- Nomination, 2005, Directing Team, The Young and the Restless
- Win, 2004, Drama Series, The Young and the Restless
- Nomination, 2004, Directing Team, The Young and the Restless
- Nomination, 2003, Drama Series, The Young and the Restless
- Win, 2002, Directing Team, The Young and the Restless
- Win, 2001, Directing Team, The Young and the Restless
- Nomination, 2000, Directing Team, The Young and the Restless
- Win, 1999, Directing Team, The Young and the Restless
- Win, 1998, Directing Team, The Young and the Restless
- Win, 1997, Directing Team, The Young and the Restless
- Win, 1996, Directing Team, The Young and the Restless
- Nomination, 1995, Directing Team, The Young and the Restless
- Nomination, 1994, Directing Team, The Young and the Restless
- Nomination, 1993, Directing Team, The Young and the Restless
- Nomination, 1992, Directing Team, The Young and the Restless
- Nomination, 1991, Directing Team, The Young and the Restless
- Nomination, 1990, Directing Team, The Young and the Restless
- Win, 1989, Directing Team, The Young and the Restless

Directors Guild of America Award

- Nomination, 1999, Directing, The Young and the Restless (Ep. #6787)
- Win, 1996, Directing, The Young and the Restless (shared with Mike Denney, Robbin Phillips, Sally McDonald, Betty Rothenberg, Dan Brumett, Don Jacob, Randall Hill, Don Philip Smith, and Nora Wade.(Ep. #5875)
