= Alan Pultz =

American television director (1937–2001)

- Born: July 7, 1937; New York City, United States
- Died: October 25, 2001 (aged 64)
- Occupation: Film director
- Years active: 1960s to 1990s

Alan Pultz (July 7, 1937 – October 25, 2001) was an American television director whose work was confined to the small screen. For many years he directed episodes of General Hospital.

== Background ==
Born in New York, he attended the University of North Carolina. He was also in the U.S. Navy and achieved the rank of lieutenant. While in the navy, he was part of the team that recovered Alan Shepard who was the first astronaut in space.

== Career ==
Early in his career he was a theater manager, and progressed to production assistant and associate director. Some of the programs he worked on were The Jimmy Dean Show and Who Do You Trust?. As a director, his early work included A Time for Us and One Life to Live. Working with producer, Gloria Monty he directed episodes of ABC Daytime's General Hospital for twenty two years. Other directorial works include Return To Peyton Place and The Best of Everything. He worked on Dark Shadows as an associate director,

In 1967, he worked on Dark Shadows as an assistant director. The three episodes he worked on aired from April to August. In 1993, both Pultz and William Ludel received the Daytime Drama award for their work on General Hospital.

== Death ==
Pultz died in his sleep on October 25, 2001, at his home in Encino, California. He was buried in Lebanon, Connecticut. He was survived by Doris, his wife and a brother and sister.

== Awards and nominations ==
- Pultz was nominated for 8 Daytime Emmy Awards (his first nomination was shared with Marlene Laird/Marlene Laird and Phil Sogard) and won 3 times.
- He won a Directors Guild of America Award in 1996 for Outstanding Directorial Achievement in Serials - Daytime.
