= Craig McManus =

Craig McManus is an American television soap opera director and stage manager.

== Positions held ==
General Hospital

- Occasional Director (1996–present)
- Stage Manager (1996–present)

== Awards and nominations ==
Daytime Emmy Award

- Win, 2000, 2004-2006, Directing Team, General Hospital
- Nomination, 1996-1999, 2001, Directing Team, General Hospital

Directors Guild of America Award

- Win, 2006, Directing Team, General Hospital (episode #10,914)
- Win, 2003, Directing Team, Port Charles (episode #1433)
- Win, 2002, Directing Team, General Hospital (episode #9801)
- Win, 1998, Directing Team, General Hospital (episode #8883)
- Win, 1996, Directing Team, General Hospital (episode #8248)
