= James Wall (actor) =

American actor

- Born: James Earl Wall; December 12, 1917; Wilmington, North Carolina, U.S.
- Died: October 27, 2010 (aged 92); New York City, New York, U.S.
- Education: Alexander Hamilton High School; New York University; Columbia University
- Occupations: Actor stage manager
- Years active: 1950–2010
- Spouse: Verine Franklin

James Earl Wall (December 12, 1917 – October 27, 2010) was an American stage manager and actor, best known for his longstanding role as Mr. Baxter on Captain Kangaroo.

== Early life and career ==
Born in Wilmington, North Carolina, and raised there and in the Bedford-Stuyvesant section of Brooklyn, New York, Wall was the younger of two sons born to Elizabeth Davis and Ballie W. Wall Sr., a barber. He attended Alexander Hamilton High School, NYU, and Columbia University.

A communications major who had mastered French, Spanish, Portuguese, Yiddish, and Russian, Wall later said he first felt the urge to perform while serving in the United States Army during World War II, where he rose to the rank of master sergeant.

Having performed on radio, theater, and in the Army during World War II, Wall worked as both actor and stage manager on Broadway before being hired as the stage manager for the children's television series Captain Kangaroo by CBS in 1962. Two years later, he portrayed a stage manager in "The Lost Lady Blues", the next-to-last episode of the short-lived CBS series, The Reporter. In an interview clip that aired on the October 28, 2010, CBS Evening News, Wall recalled how he made the case to Kangaroo's producers for an African-American character. However, he still had to audition for the role which became Mr. Baxter, a teacher and Captain Kangaroo's neighbor. Wall joined the cast in 1968, remaining with the show until 1979; he made a guest appearance in 1981. He was also the stage manager for 41 consecutive years on the US Open Tennis Championships telecasts.

Wall was presented with the Directors Guild of America's Franklin J. Schaffner Achievement Award in 1994. He continued to work for CBS in semi-retirement until 2009.

== Personal life and death ==
From at least 1950 through 1958, Wall was married to Verine Franklin.

On October 27, 2010, at age 92, Wall died in his sleep at his Manhattan home.
