= Deveney Kelly =

Deveney Marking Kelly is an American television soap opera director and former producer. On-screen, Deveney is credited as Deveney Kelly, but is also known as Deveney Marking.

== Positions held ==
The Young and the Restless

- Occasional Director (2008, 2009)

The Bold and the Beautiful

- Director (1992–present)
- Producer (1996–1999)

Days of Our Lives

- Occasional Director (2005–2006)

== Awards and nominations ==
Daytime Emmy Award

- Nomination, 2006, Directing Team, The Bold and the Beautiful
- Nomination, 2002, Directing Team, The Bold and the Beautiful
- Nomination, 2000, Directing Team, The Bold and the Beautiful

Directors Guild of America Award

- Nomination, 1997, Directing Team, The Bold and the Beautiful (episode #2681)
