= Dean LaMont =

American television director

Dean LaMont is an American Daytime Emmy Award-winning television director.

His directing credits include The Young and the Restless, The Bold and the Beautiful and General Hospital. He won a Daytime Emmy in 2011 for The Young and the Restless and has been nominated in the same category a total of 4 times. In 2010 he was nominated by the Directors Guild of America for Outstanding Directorial Achievement in Daytime Serials for the year 2009.

He began his career as a camera operator, with credits including CBS News, Family Feud, The Price Is Right, The Bold and the Beautiful, The Young and the Restless, General Hospital, as well as various other CBS shows. LaMont has won ten Daytime Emmy Awards for his camera work on The Young and the Restless and The Bold and the Beautiful and has been nominated an additional three times in the same category.
