= Noel Maxam =

American television director, producer, and writer (born 1967)

- Born: September 26, 1967 (age 59)
- Education: Carnegie Mellon University; University of Southern California
- Occupations: Director, Writer, Producer
- Known for: Days of Our Lives, As the World Turns, The Young and the Restless

Noel Maxam (born September 26, 1967) is an American television director, writer, and producer known for his work on popular soap operas, including As the World Turns, The Young and the Restless, and Days of Our Lives. He has also made notable contributions to the entertainment industry through his involvement with startups and his direction in commercials and international promotions.

== Early life and education ==
Maxam is a graduate of the Interlochen Arts Academy in Interlochen, Michigan, where he earned his high school diploma. He continued his education at Carnegie Mellon University in Pittsburgh, Pennsylvania, where he received a B.F.A. in Directing. Later, he pursued an M.F.A. in Film and Video Production at the University of Southern California in Los Angeles, California.

== Career ==
=== Early career ===
Maxam began his career as a writer on the CBS Daytime soap opera As the World Turns (1995–1997). He then transitioned to The Young and the Restless in 1997, where he introduced non-linear editing techniques and high-definition production to the show. Maxam served as associate producer, managed post-production, and directed for over a decade.

=== Work on Days of Our Lives ===
In 2007, Maxam moved to NBC to work as a producer on Days of Our Lives, where he quickly rose through the ranks to become co-executive producer in 2011. He worked on the show until 2012, contributing to its direction and success during his tenure.

=== Freelance career and Emagispace ===
After leaving Days of Our Lives, Maxam transitioned to freelancing as a director. He founded Emagispace, a company that has advised several startups, including the video streaming platform Pluto TV, which was later acquired by Viacom in 2019. In addition to his work with startups, Maxam directed for other notable productions, including The Young and the Restless, Hollywood Heights, and various projects for Disney.

=== Return to Days of Our Lives ===
In 2023, Maxam returned to Days of Our Lives, taking on the role of Senior Producer. In 2025, Maxam was selected to succeed Co-Executive Producer Janet Druker-Spellman.

== Positions held ==
- Disney: Director of International Promotions and Commercials
- Hollywood Heights: Director (Season 1)
- Days of Our Lives:
  - Co-Executive Producer (Sept. 17, 2008–Sept. 2, 2011)
  - Supervising Producer (Jan. 16, 2009–Fall 2011)
  - Producer (Sept. 10, 2007 – Jan. 2009)
  - Director (Sept. 21, 2007 – Fall 2011, 2015–present)
- Days of Our Lives: Beyond Salem
  - Director (2021–2022)
- Days of Our Lives: A Very Salem Christmas
  - Director (2021)
- The Young and the Restless:
  - Post-production supervisor (1999–2012)
  - Director (1999 – Sept. 11, 2007, Dec. 16, 2011–Present)
  - Supervising Producer (2020)
  - Associate Director (1997–1999)
- As the World Turns:
  - Associate Writer (1995–1997)
  - Writer (1996)

== Awards and nominations ==
=== Daytime Emmy Award nominations ===
- Outstanding Drama Series, Days of Our Lives (2012, 2009)
- Directing Team, Days of Our Lives (2009)
- Directing Team, The Young and the Restless (2000, 2004–2006)
- Directing Team, Days of Our Lives (1998, 1999, 2001, 2002)

=== Directors Guild of America (DGA) Award nominations ===
- Outstanding Directorial Achievement in Daytime Serials for Days of Our Lives (2009) – Episode #10,763
- Outstanding Directorial Achievement in Daytime Serials for The Young and the Restless (2000) – Episode #6,632
