= Shelley Curtis =

American director and producer of soap operas

- Occupation: television director
- Years active: 1979-present
- Known for: Days of Our Lives, General Hospital

Shelley Curtis is an American television soap opera director and producer. She has been working in daytime since 1979. She's sometimes credited as Shelly Curtis.

== Positions held ==
All My Children

- Occasional Director (2003–2007, 2010–2011)

Days of Our Lives

- Supervising Producer (1988–1989, 1989–1992)
- Supervising Executive Producer (1989)
- Producer (1983–1988)
- Director (1983–1988)

General Hospital

- Director (1992–2001, 2002)
- Consulting Producer (1994–2001)
- Producer (1992–1994)
- Associate Director (1979–1982)

Guiding Light

- Occasional Director (2002–2007)

Loving

- Occasional Director (1994–1995)

One Life to Live

- Occasional Director (1997–2001)

Port Charles

- Occasional Director (1997–1999, 2002)
- Consulting Producer (1997–1999)

Monarch Cove

- Executive Producer (2006)

== Awards and nominations ==
Daytime Emmy Award

- Nomination, 1995–2001, Drama Series, General Hospital
- Nomination, 1995–2001, Best Directing, General Hospital
- Win, 1995–2000, Drama Series, General Hospital
- Win, 2000, Directing, General Hospital

Directors Guild of America Award

- Nomination, 1996, Directing, General Hospital

== Other ==
- Curtis is largely credited with inventing the word juj in 1984. Defined as adding style to a person, outfit or cinematic set. The word was adopted by Queer Eye for the Straight Guy and has since become common parlance in and out of Hollywood.
