= Christopher Goutman =

American writer, producer, actor and director

Christopher Goutman (born December 19, 1952) is an American writer, producer, actor and director. He is most notable for his work on daytime soap operas.

He was married from 1985 to 2016 to actress Marcia McCabe, whom he met while he was on Search for Tomorrow.

== Positions held ==
All My Children

- Director: 1987–1996, 2013

Another World

- Executive Producer: November 1998 – June 25, 1999
- Director: 1983–1987, 1998–1999

As the World Turns

- Head Writer (with Vivian Gundaker): January 25, 2008 – April 18, 2008
- Executive Producer: July 1999 – September 17, 2010
- Occasional Director: 1999–2010
- Director: 1996–1998

Days of Our Lives

- Director: June 1, 2011 – July 15, 2011 (three episodes)

Guiding Light

- Director: 1982–1983

Santa Barbara

- Director (late 1980s)

The Young and the Restless

- Director: December 15, 2010 – January 2011 (two episodes)

== Acting credits ==
- 1978–79: Search for Tomorrow as Marc D'Antoni
- 1980–81: The Edge of Night as Sharkey
- 1981: Charlie's Angels as David (episode: "Waikiki Angels")
- 1981: Bosom Buddies as Todd (episode: "Beauty and the Beasts")
- 1981: The Prowler as Deputy Mark London
- 1982: Texas as George St. John
- 1983: The Powers of Matthew Star as Lou Daggot (episode: "The Great Waldo Shepherd")
- 1985: Goodbye, New York as Jack
- 1986: George Washington II: The Forging of a Nation as James Reynolds

== Awards and nominations ==
Daytime Emmy Awards

- Nominations: (2002, 2004–2006; Best Drama Series; ATWT); (1990–1994; Best Directing; AMC)
- Wins: (2001, 2003; Best Drama Series; ATWT); (1995; Best Directing; AMC)

His first awards nomination in 1990 was shared with Jack Coffey, Henry Kaplan, Conal O'Brien, Barbara M. Simmons, and Shirley Simmons.

Directors Guild of America

- Nominations: 1998 (for ATWT, shared with Charles C. Dyer and Maria Wagner – episode #10,446), 2005, 2008

Preceded by Charlotte Savitz	Executive Producer of Another World; November 1998 – June 25, 1999	Succeeded by show canceled
Preceded by Felicia Minei Behr	Executive Producer of As the World Turns; July 1999 – September 2010	Succeeded by show canceled
