= Cynthia J. Popp =

American television director and producer

Cynthia J. Popp (born May 6, 1962) is an American television director and producer on the soap opera The Bold and the Beautiful. She produced music videos for John McCook, Bobbie Eakes and Jeff Trachta and The Wiggles. Beside working on daytime, Popp directed two episodes of Frasier.

== Positions held ==
Jacob's Edge

- Director (present)
- Producer (present)

The Bold and the Beautiful

- Director (1996–present)
- Producer (1999–present)
- Associate Director (1990–1999)
- Production Associate (1986–1992)

Frasier

- Director (2003–2004)

Passions

- Director (1999)

== Awards and nominations ==
Daytime Emmy Award

- Win, 2009, Producing Team, The Bold and The Beautiful
- Nomination, 2007, Producing Team, The Bold and The Beautiful
- Nomination, 2004, Producing Team, The Bold and The Beautiful
- Nomination, 2003, Producing Team, The Bold and The Beautiful
- Nomination, 2008, Directing Team, The Bold and The Beautiful
- Nomination, 2006, Directing Team, The Bold and The Beautiful
- Nomination, 2002, Directing Team, The Bold and The Beautiful
- Nomination, 2000, Directing Team, The Bold and The Beautiful

Directors Guild of America Award

- Win, 1995, Directing Team, The Bold and the Beautiful, (episode 1884)
- Win, 1992, Directing Team, The Bold and the Beautiful, (episode 1103)
