= Mike Denney =

American television soap opera director

Mike Denney is an American television soap opera director. Denney has worked on the CBS Daytime drama The Young and the Restless for nearly 20 years, but in 2007, he quit the show. In January 2008, he joined the directing team of Days of Our Lives, but left after the firing of then Co-Executive Producer, Edward J. Scott. He has since rejoined The Young and the Restless as a director.

== Directing credits ==
Capitol: 1982-1983

The Young and the Restless: 1989 - May 9, 2007; October 13, 2008 - November 13, 2012 Retired November 2012

Days of Our Lives: January 2008 - August 12, 2008

== Awards and nominations ==
Daytime Emmy Award

- Nomination, 1990-2002, 2004-2006, Directing Team, The Young and the Restless
- Win, 1996-1999, 2001, 2002, Directing Team, The Young and the Restless

Directors Guild of America Award

- Win, 1997, Directing Team, The Young and the Restless (for episode #5875)

Emmy Award

- Win, 1986, Technical Direction/Electronic Camera/Video Control, Neil Diamond... Hello Again (mini-series)
