= Owen Renfroe =

American television director

Owen Renfroe is an American film and television director. He graduated from Wesleyan University, where he studied film with Professor Jeanine Basinger. His professional career began at age ten, when he sang in the children's chorus of the Metropolitan Opera Company.

== Positions held ==
Hollywood Heights

- Director (2012)

General Hospital

- Director (2001–2012)

General Hospital: Night Shift

- Director (2007)

One Life to Live

- Associate Director/Director (1996–2001)

The Young and the Restless

- Director (November 30, 2012–present)

== Awards and nominations ==
Daytime Emmy Award

- Won, 2004–2006, Directing Team, General Hospital
- Nominated, 2001, Multiple Camera Editing, One Life to Live

Directors Guild of America Award

- Nominated, 2010, Outstanding Directorial Achievement in a Daytime Serial, "General Hospital"
- Won, 2006, Outstanding Directorial Achievement in a Daytime Serial, General Hospital
- Won, 1999 & 2001, Directing Team, One Life to Live
