= Conal O'Brien =

American television director

Conal O'Brien (born July 18, 1956) has worked as an American television director for over 30 years, and is a graduate of Carnegie Mellon University. He is the author of the Bookbinder Mysteries Series: Book One: ''Birth of the Angel, Book Two: Death of Television, and Book Three: What Ever Happened to Anna Canneli? published in 2026.

His father, Vince O'Brien, appeared in several soap operas, in addition to roles in films, such as Annie Hall, as well as playing the "Shell Answer Man".

== Positions held ==
All My Children

- Director (1987-2010)
- Fight Director (1984-1990)
- Director/Producer two short films: The Secret, Quiet
- Guest Director: One Life To Life

The Young and the Restless

- Director: December 9, 2010-2017

== Awards and nominations ==
Daytime Emmy Award

- Nomination, 1990–1994, 1996–2002, 2005, Directing, All My Children
- Win, 1995 & 2003, Directing, All My Children

Directors Guild of America Award

- Nomination, 2004, Directing, All My Children, (episode #8768)
- Nomination, 2000, Directing, All My Children, (episode #7969)
- Nomination, 2005, Directing, All My Children
