= Sally McDonald =

American television soap opera director

Sally McDonald is an American television soap opera director. McDonald is recognized for directing The Young and the Restless, and 2025, has been an executive producer for the serial. Beside working on daytime soap operas, McDonald was also a production supervisor for game shows The $10,000 Pyramid, Card Sharks and Win, Lose or Draw.

== Positions held ==
- Production supervisor (1990–1993)
- Associate director (1993–1997)
- Director (1997–2011; 2012–2025)
- Producer (2008)
- Supervising producer (2011–2012)
- Co-executive producer (2025–2026)
- Executive producer (since 2026)

== Awards and nominations ==
Daytime Emmy Award

- Nomination, 1994, 1995, 2000, 2004–2006, Directing Team, The Young and the Restless
- Win, 1996–1999, 2001, 2002, Directing Team, The Young and the Restless

Directors Guild of America Award

- Nomination, 2003, Directing Team, The Young and the Restless (episode #7784)
- Nomination, 1998, Directing Team, The Young and the Restless (episode #6437)
