= Scott McKinsey =

American television director

- Born: Scott Mark McKinsey; April 16, 1959 (age 65); California, USA
- Occupation: Television/soap opera director
- Spouse(s): Nancy Bates (2002-present); 1 child)

Scott McKinsey (born April 16, 1959) is an American television soap opera director.

== Family ==
McKinsey is the son of late actress Beverlee McKinsey, who was known for long-running roles on Another World and Guiding Light.

== Directing Credits ==
- As the World Turns (2001–2002)
- Days of Our Lives (2015–present)
- General Hospital (1992–2001, 2002–2020)
- General Hospital: Night Shift (2007)
- Guarding Eddy (2004)
- Guiding Light (1986–1991)
- Miss Behave (2012)
- Port Charles (1997–2001, 2002–2003)
- Search for Tomorrow (early 1980s)
- Valley of the Dolls (1994)
- The Young and the Restless (2017–2018)

== Awards and nominations ==
=== Daytime Emmy Awards ===
Wins

- 1983: Outstanding Film Editing in Children's Programming – CBS Schoolbreak Special – (Episode: "The Shooting")
- 1983: Outstanding Individual Achievement in Religious Programming - Film Editing – Insight
- 2000, 2004–2006, 2010, 2012, 2016–2017: Outstanding Drama Series Directing Team – General Hospital
- 2018: Outstanding Drama Series Directing Team - Days Of Our Lives

Nominations

- 1990–1991: Outstanding Drama Series Directing Team – Guiding Light
- 1996–1999, 2007–2008, 2011, 2015, 2018-2019: Outstanding Drama Series Directing Team – General Hospital
- 2003: Outstanding Drama Series Directing Team – As the World Turns
- 2017–2020: Outstanding Directing Team for a Drama Series – Days Of Our Lives.

=== Directors Guild of America Awards ===
Wins

- 1997: Outstanding Directorial Achievement in Daytime Serials – General Hospital – (Episode #8883)
- 2002: Outstanding Directorial Achievement in Daytime Serials – Port Charles – (Episode #1433)

Nominations

- 1995: Outstanding Directorial Achievement in Serials - Daytime – General Hospital – (Episode #8233) (Shared with Shelley Curtis)
- 1996: Outstanding Directorial Achievement in Serials - Daytime – General Hospital – (Episode #8492)
- 2006: Outstanding Directorial Achievement in Daytime Serials – General Hospital – (Episode #11178)
- 2007: Outstanding Directorial Achievement in Daytime Serials – General Hospital – (Episode #11228)
- 2011: Outstanding Directorial Achievement in Daytime Serials – General Hospital – (Episode: "Forces of Nature")
- 2012: Outstanding Directorial Achievement in Daytime Serials – General Hospital – (Episode: "Shot Through the Heart")
