= Michael Stich (director) =

American television soap opera director

Michael S. Stich is an American television soap opera director. On-screen, Stich is credited with his real name on B&B, but as Mike Stich on Y&R.

== Positions held ==
The Bold and the Beautiful

- Director (1987–2019)

The Young and the Restless

- Occasional Director (2008, 2009)

Capitol

- Occasional Director (1985–1987)

== Awards and nominations ==
Daytime Emmy Award

- Nomination, 2008, Best Directing, The Bold and the Beautiful
- Nomination, 2006, Best Directing, The Bold and the Beautiful
- Nomination, 2002, Best Directing, The Bold and the Beautiful
- Nomination, 2000, Best Directing, The Bold and the Beautiful

Directors Guild of America Award

- Nomination, 2005, Best Directing, The Bold and the Beautiful (episode #4623)
- Nomination, 2002, Best Directing, The Bold and the Beautiful (episode #3948)
- Nomination, 2001, Best Directing, The Bold and the Beautiful (episode #3532)
- Nomination, 1996, Best Directing, The Bold and the Beautiful (episode #2392)
- Win, 1994, Best Directing, The Bold and the Beautiful (episode #1884)
- Nomination, 1993, Best Directing, The Bold and the Beautiful
- Win, 1991, Best Directing, The Bold and the Beautiful (episode #1103)
