= Bruce S. Barry =

American television soap opera director

Bruce S. Barry is an American television soap opera director.

== Positions held ==
As the World Turns

- Occasional Director (1979, 1980, 1981)

Guiding Light

- Director (1978- August 16, 2004)

Love of Life

- Associate Director (1977-1978)

Search for Tomorrow

- Associate Director (1977-1978)

Texas

- Occasional Director (1982)

== Awards and nominations ==
Daytime Emmy Award

- Nomination, 2005, Directing, As the World Turns
- Win, 1994, Directing, Guiding Light
- Nomination, 1993, Directing, Guiding Light
- Nomination, 1991, Directing, Guiding Light
- Nomination, 1990, Directing, Guiding Light
- Nomination, 1986, Directing, Guiding Light
- Win, 1985, Directing, Guiding Light

Directors Guild of America

- Win, 2005, Directing, Guiding Light
- Nomination, 2001, Directing, Guiding Light
- Nomination, 1997, Directing, Guiding Light
- Nomination, 1996, Directing, Guiding Light
