= Joseph Behar =

American television director (1926–2021)

- Born: September 30, 1926; Harlem, New York, U.S.
- Died: June 26, 2021 (aged 94); Manhattan Beach, California, U.S.
- Other names: Joe Behar
- Occupations: Director; producer
- Years active: 1951–2004
- Children: 1

Joseph Behar (September 30, 1926 – June 26, 2021) was an American television director. He was known for directing the game show Let's Make a Deal, as well as the serials The Greatest Gift (producer and director), First Love, From These Roots, Days of Our Lives, and General Hospital.

== Primetime credits ==
- Dangerous Women
- Superior Court
- College Mad House
- Fun House
- Let's Make A Deal
- It's Anybody's Guess
- People Will Talk
- The Ernie Kovacs Show

== Daytime credits ==
- Days of Our Lives - director (1965–1988)
- First Love (1954–1955)
- From These Roots - director (1958–1961)
- General Hospital - director (1996–2006)
- The Greatest Gift (1953–1954)
- The Young and the Restless

== Awards and nominations ==
Daytime Emmy Award

- Win, 2000, 2004–2006, Directing Team, General Hospital
- Nomination, 1996–1999, 2001, Directing Team, General Hospital
- Win, 1990, Directing Team, Fun House
- Nomination, 1975, 1977, 1979, 1985–1988, Directing Team, Days of our Lives
- Nomination, 1988, Directing Team, Superior Court

Directors Guild of America Award

- Nomination, 1996, 1999 ("The Bacchanalia" Episode # 2580), 2005, Directing, General Hospital
- Win, 1962, Directing, Ernie Kovacs Show
