= William Ludel =

American television soap opera director

William Ludel (sometime credited Bill Ludel) is an American television soap opera director.

== Directing credits ==
Another World

- Director (1972–1974)

General Hospital

- Director (1994–present)

Days of Our Lives

- Occasional Director (1990s)

== Awards and nominations ==
Daytime Emmy Award

- Win, 2000, 2004–2006, Directing Team, General Hospital
- Nomination, 1994–1999, 2001, Directing Team, General Hospital

Directors Guild of America Award

- Nomination, 2007, Directing, General Hospital (Ep. #11177)
- Nomination, 2002, Directing, General Hospital (shared with Howard Ritter, Christine Magarian, Ronald Cates, Craig McManus, Susan Diamant-Neigher, Kathleen Ladd, Denise Van Cleave, and Penny Pengra(Ep. #9801)
- Nomination, 1996, Directing, General Hospital (Ep. #8248)
