= Fairmont Century Plaza =

Hotel in Century City, Los Angeles, California

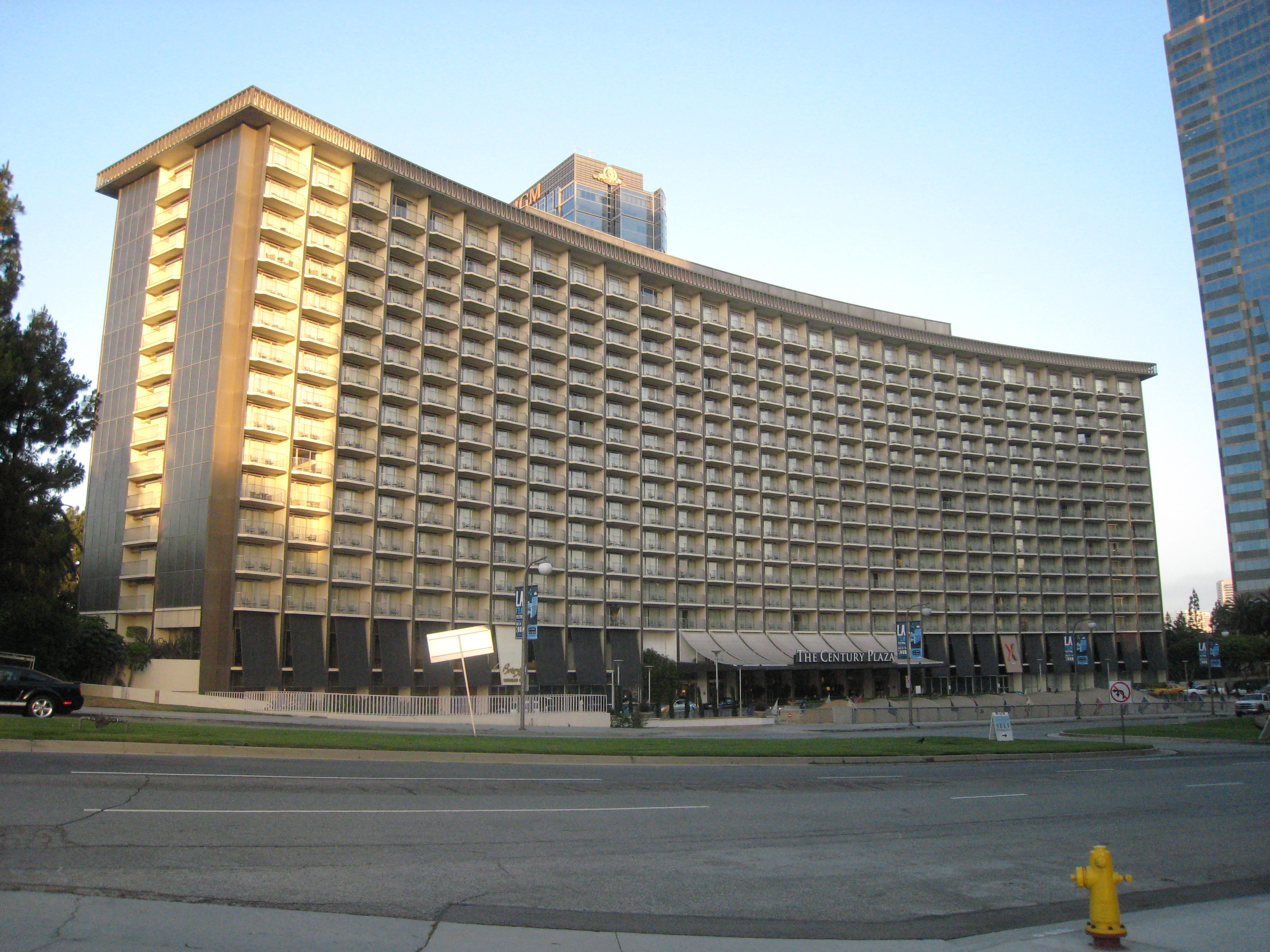
- Interactive map of the Fairmont Century Plaza area

General information
- Type: Hotel
- Location: 2025 Avenue of the Stars; Los Angeles, California
- Coordinates: 34.057449°N 118.415886°W
- Completed: June 1, 1966; 60 years ago
- Owner: Next Century Associates
- Operator: Fairmont Hotels and Resorts

Technical details
- Floor count: 19

Design and construction
- Architect: Minoru Yamasaki

Other information
- Number of rooms: 400

The Fairmont Century Plaza is a historic 19-story luxury hotel in Century City, Los Angeles, US. The hotel fronts the Avenue of the Stars, adjacent to the twin Century Plaza Towers and the 2000 Avenue of the Stars complex. At the time of its opening in 1966, the hotel was the highest building in Century City, with views extending to the Pacific Ocean. It was the first hotel to have color televisions in every room. The hotel closed for renovations in 2016 and reopened on September 27, 2021, operated by Fairmont Hotels and Resorts. It is a member of Historic Hotels of America.

== History ==
In 1961, developer William Zeckendorf and Alcoa bought about 180 acres (0.73 km^{2}) from 20th Century Fox after the studio had suffered a string of expensive film flops, culminating in the box-office disaster Cleopatra. Century City was built as "a city within a city", with the arc-shaped, 19-story, 750-room Minoru Yamasaki-designed Century Plaza as the centerpiece.

The Century Plaza Hotel opened on June 1, 1966, with doormen wearing red Beefeater costumes. It was managed by Western International Hotels (later renamed Westin Hotels). Its hospitality department had 100 maids and 50 housemen, managed by hospitality director Georgina Tucker. The hotel's ballrooms hosted numerous high-profile events, including an opening charity gala in 1966 with Bob Hope as master of ceremonies, who along with singer Andy Williams entertained Ronald and Nancy Reagan and Walt and Lillian Disney.

In 1967, 1,300 club-swinging police clashed with 10,000 anti-Vietnam War demonstrators as President Johnson spoke at a Democratic fundraiser at the hotel. On August 13, 1969, President Richard Nixon hosted a lavish state dinner in the Los Angeles Ballroom to celebrate the Apollo 11 Moon landing astronauts.

In 1984, the hotel added a 322-room tower on the south portion of the property, adjacent to Olympic Boulevard. The Tower at Century Plaza was marketed as a luxury wing of the hotel and increased capacity to 1,072 rooms. Ronald Reagan by arrangement signed in as the first guest of the newly completed Tower on December 27, 1984. In 1999 the hotel rededicated its penthouse suite comprising the entire 32nd floor the Ronald Reagan Suite. While Reagan was in office, he stayed in the Tower so frequently the media dubbed it his "Western White House". President Reagan had recently celebrated his re-election to a second term as President on the stage of the Los Angeles Ballroom in the original Century Plaza Hotel on November 6, 1984. In 2000, soon after Westin was acquired by Starwood, the Tower was converted into a separate hotel under a more luxurious Starwood brand, The St. Regis Los Angeles. That hotel was then sold by the owners of the Century Plaza in 2005 to developers who closed it for conversion to residential use. With its 1980s ceilings too low to meet modern residential demands, the relatively new building was razed to make way for The Century, a high-rise condominium completed in fall 2009.

In 2006, after being managed for its entire forty-year history by Westin Hotels, the property was taken over by Hyatt Hotels and renamed Hyatt Regency Century Plaza. However, the sign above the main entrance reading The Century Plaza was left unchanged.

Sunstone Hotel Investors Inc. bought the Hyatt Regency Century Plaza in 2005 for US$293 million and spent $22 million upgrading the guest rooms and common areas. On June 1, 2008, Sunstone sold the Hyatt Regency Century Plaza to Next Century Associates for $366.5 million, $505,000 per room, one of the highest prices paid for a hotel in California. On December 18, 2008, the new owners announced plans to demolish the hotel and build a pair of fifty-story towers in its place. On April 28, 2009, The Century Plaza Hotel was added to The National Trust for Historic Preservation's list of the 11 most endangered historic places in America. In February 2010, the developer announced that it would renovate the historic hotel building and convert some of the floors to condominiums, rather than demolishing and replacing the building as previously proposed.

The hotel closed on March 1, 2016 to begin the $2.5 billion overhaul. It ceased to be operated by Hyatt at this time. The two residential towers (Century Plaza North Tower and Century Plaza South Tower) that were to replace the hotel were, instead, built behind it as The Tower Residences at Century Plaza. Designed by Pei Cobb Freed, Gensler, and Marmol Radziner, they contain 268 condominiums. The original 726-room hotel tower was rebuilt with 400 much larger guest rooms and 63 condominiums. The hotel reopened on September 27, 2021 as the Fairmont Century Plaza, managed by Fairmont Hotels and Resorts. The Fairmont Century Plaza joined Historic Hotels of America, a program of National Trust for Historic Preservation, in 2022. In October 2023, the two new residential towers on the property were rebranded Park Elm at Century Plaza.

== Location ==
In 2027, the Century City station on the D Line is scheduled to open nearby, at the intersection of Avenue of the Stars and Constellation Boulevard.

== Notable people and events ==
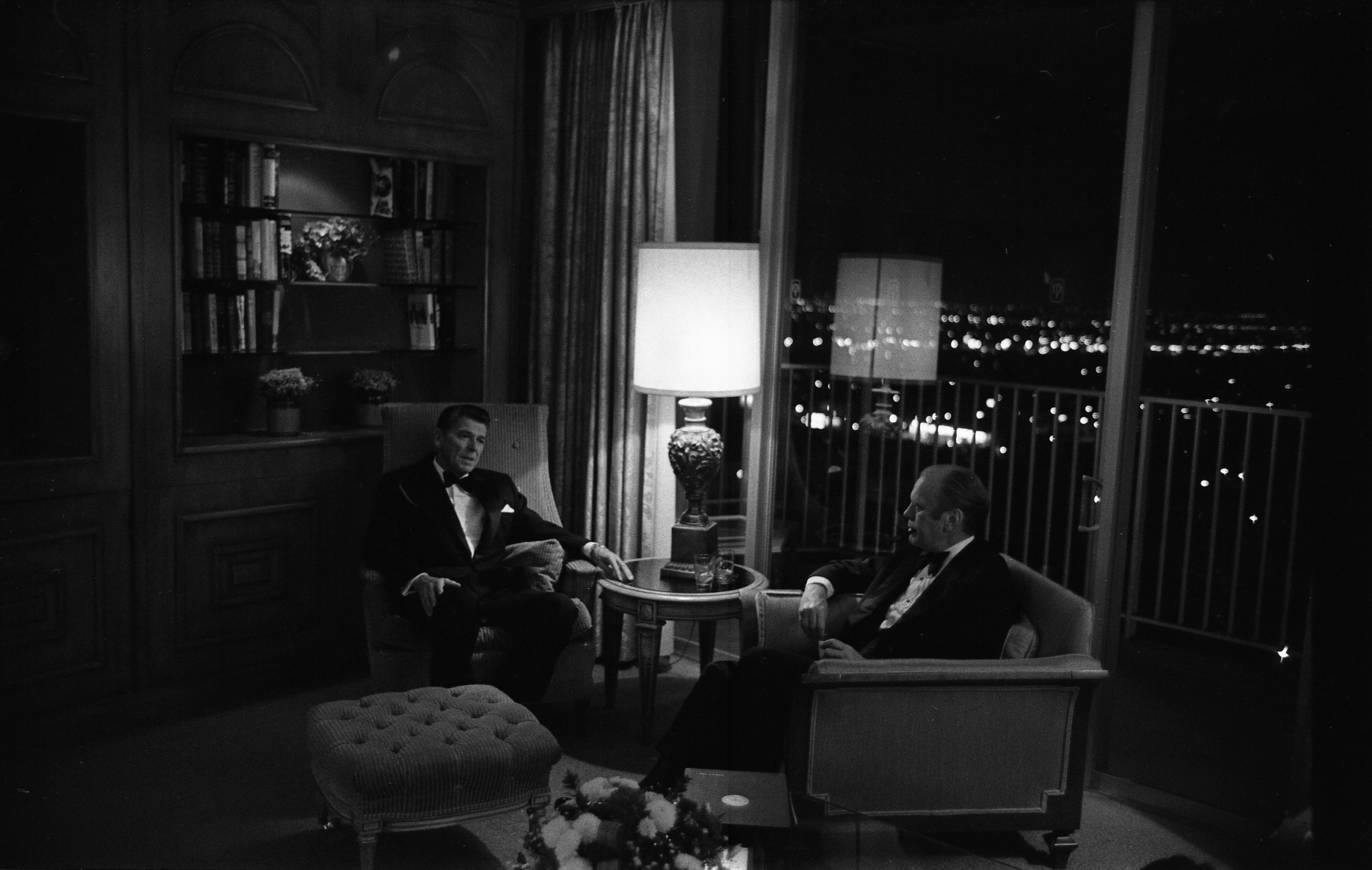
President Gerald Ford and then-governor of California Ronald Reagan meeting in the President's Suite in 1974

The Century Plaza has played host to various celebrities, foreign dignitaries, and presidents; among them, Marshal Josip Broz Tito, Moshe Dayan, Lyndon Johnson, Ronald Reagan, Prince Philip, and David Ben-Gurion. The hotel was the venue for the 1967 Emmy Awards, and the 1970 and 1971 Grammy Awards. It was also the venue for the 2009 and 2010 Visual Effects Society's prestigious annual awards ceremony. In early 2022 the newly re-opened Hotel hosted the Academy Awards Nominees lunch, the Critics Choice awards, and the Producers Guild Awards honouring George Lucas.

== In popular culture ==
The Century Plaza Hotel's dramatic curved facade is seen in the 1980 film, 9 To 5, both from a distant establishing shot and from one of the balconies, when the character Missy Hart is staying in the hotel.

The Century Plaza Hotel is featured in the 2008 video game, Midnight Club: Los Angeles, and is mimicked in the 2004 video game, Grand Theft Auto: San Andreas.
