= Jill Mitwell =

American television soap opera director

- Born: Jill Mitwell
- Occupation: director
- Known for: Directing: One Life to Live; As the World Turns

Jill Mitwell is an American television soap opera director. Mitwell gave the acceptance speech for One Life to Live winning the Daytime Emmy Award for the directing team in 2008.

== Directing credits ==
- All My Children Occasional Director (2001)
- As the World Turns Director (1987–1991; 1998–1999)
- Guiding Light Director (Early 1980s)
- One Life to Live Director (1992–1998; 2000–2006; 2006–January 2012)
- "Remember WENN" Director (1997)

== Awards and nominations ==
Daytime Emmy Award

- Win, 2014, Directing, "One Life to Live" (online reboot)
- Win, 2009, Directing, "One Life to Live"
- Win, 2008, Directing, "One Life to "Live"
- Nominated, 2007, Directing, One Life to Live
- Nominated, 2004, Directing, One Life to Live
- Nominated, 1995, Directing, One Life to Live
- Nominated, 1992, Directing, As the World Turns
- Nominated, 1990, Directing, As the World Turns
- Nominated, 1989, Directing, As the World Turns
- Nominated, 1988, Directing, As the World Turns

Directors Guild of America Award

- Win, 2013, Directing, "One Life to Live", episode "Between Heaven and Hell"
- Nomination, 2010, Directing, "One Life to Live", episode 10,688
- Win, 2007, Directing, One Life to Live, (episode #9779)
- Nomination, 2002, Directing, One Life to Live, (episode #8691)
- Win, 2000, Directing, One Life to Live, (episode #8205)
- Nomination, 1999, Directing, One Life to Live, (episode #8012)
- Nomination, 1998, Directing, One Life to Live, (episode #7761)
- Nomination, 1996, Directing, One Life to Live, (episode #7285)
- Win, 1993, Directing, One Life to Live, (episode #6356)
