= 69th Directors Guild of America Awards =

- Date: February 4, 2017
- Location: The Beverly Hilton, Beverly Hills, California
- Country: United States
- Presented by: Directors Guild of America
- Hosted by: Jane Lynch

Highlights
- Best Director Feature Film: La La Land – Damien Chazelle
- Best Director Documentary: O.J.: Made in America – Ezra Edelman
- Best Director First-Time Feature Film: Lion – Garth Davis
- Website: https://www.dga.org/Awards/History/2010s/2016.aspx?value=2016

The 69th Directors Guild of America Awards, honoring the outstanding directorial achievements in films, documentary and television in 2016, were presented on February 4, 2017, at the Beverly Hilton. The ceremony was hosted by Jane Lynch. The nominations for the television and documentary categories were announced on January 11, 2017, while the nominations for the film categories were announced on January 12, 2017.

== Winners and nominees ==
=== Film ===
Feature Film

Damien Chazelle – La La Land

- Garth Davis – Lion
- Barry Jenkins – Moonlight
- Kenneth Lonergan – Manchester by the Sea
- Denis Villeneuve – Arrival
Documentaries

Ezra Edelman – O.J.: Made in America

- Otto Bell – The Eagle Huntress
- Josh Kriegman and Elyse Steinberg – Weiner
- Raoul Peck – I Am Not Your Negro
- Roger Ross Williams – Life, Animated
First-Time Feature Film

Garth Davis – Lion

- Kelly Fremon Craig – The Edge of Seventeen
- Tim Miller – Deadpool
- Nate Parker – The Birth of a Nation
- Dan Trachtenberg – 10 Cloverfield Lane

=== Television ===
Drama Series

Miguel Sapochnik – Game of Thrones for "Battle of the Bastards"

- The Duffer Brothers – Stranger Things for "Chapter One: The Vanishing of Will Byers"
- Ryan Murphy – The People v. O. J. Simpson: American Crime Story for "From the Ashes of Tragedy"
- Jonathan Nolan – Westworld for "The Original"
- John Singleton – The People v. O. J. Simpson: American Crime Story for "The Race Card"
Comedy Series

Becky Martin – Veep for "Inauguration"

- Alec Berg – Silicon Valley for "Daily Active Users"
- Donald Glover – Atlanta for "B.A.N."
- Mike Judge – Silicon Valley for "Founder Friendly"
- Dale Stern – Veep for "Mother"
Miniseries or TV Film

Steven Zaillian – The Night Of for "The Beach"

- Raymond De Felitta – Madoff
- Thomas Kail and Alec Rudzinski – Grease: Live
- Kenny Leon and Alec Rudzinski – Hairspray Live!
- Jay Roach – All the Way
Variety/Talk/News/Sports – Regularly Scheduled Programming

Don Roy King – Saturday Night Live for "Host: Dave Chappelle"

- Paul G. Casey – Real Time with Bill Maher for "Show #1437"
- Nora Gerard – CBS News Sunday Morning for "Charles Osgood Farewell Broadcast"
- Jim Hoskinson – The Late Show with Stephen Colbert for "Episode #0179"
- Paul Pennolino – Full Frontal with Samantha Bee for "Episode #1030"
Variety/Talk/News/Sports – Specials

Glenn Weiss – The 70th Annual Tony Awards

- Jerry Foley – Tony Bennett Celebrates 90: The Best Is Yet to Come
- Tim Mancinelli – The Late Late Show with James Corden for "The Late Late Show Carpool Karaoke Primetime Special"
- Linda Mendoza – Smithsonian Salutes Ray Charles: In Performance at the White House
- Paul Myers – Full Frontal with Samantha Bee for "A Very Special Full Frontal Special"
Reality Programs

J. Rupert Thompson – American Grit for "Over the Falls"

- Ken Fuchs – Shark Tank for "801"
- John Gonzalez – Live PD for "Episode 5"
- Brian Smith – Strong for "Welcome to Strong"
- Bertram van Munster – The Amazing Race for "We're Only Doing Freaky Stuff Today"
Children's Programs

Tina Mabry – An American Girl Story – Melody 1963: Love Has to Win

- Liz Allen – The Kicks for "Pilot"
- Alethea Jones – Gortimer Gibbon's Life on Normal Street for "Gortimer and the Jacks of All Trades"
- Michael Lembeck – A Nutcracker Christmas
- John Schultz – Adventures in Babysitting

=== Commercials ===
Commercials

Derek Cianfrance – Nike Golf's "Chase", Powerade's "Doubts" and "Expectations", and Squarespace's "Manifesto"

- Lance Acord – Apple's "Frankie's Holiday" and Kohl's' "Movie Night"
- Dante Ariola – SunTrust's "Hold Your Breath", Lyft's "Riding is the New Driving", and Beats' "Tell Me When To Go"
- Fredrik Bond – Apple's "Dive", Philips' "Everyday Hero", and LG's "World of Play"
- A.G. Rojas – S7 Airlines' "The Best Planet" and Samsung's "The Snail"

=== Lifetime Achievement in Feature Film ===
- Ridley Scott

=== Frank Capra Achievement Award ===
- Marie Cantin

=== Robert B. Aldrich Service Award ===
- Thomas Schlamme

=== Presidents Award ===
- Jay Roth
