= American Grit =

- Genre: Reality competition
- Starring: John Cena; Rorke Denver; Noah Galloway; Tawanda Hanible; Nicholas Irving; John Burk; Riki Long; Chloe Mondesir; Grady Powell
- Country of origin: United States
- Original language: English
- No. of seasons: 2
- No. of episodes: 20

Production
- Executive producers: John Cena; Brent Montgomery; David George; Adam Sher; Will Nothacker; Jon Kroll
- Running time: 43 minutes

Original release
- Network: Fox
- Release: April 14, 2016 – August 6, 2017

American Grit is an American reality television series that premiered on Fox on April 14, 2016. The series stars WWE wrestler John Cena. Fox ordered ten episodes for the first season of the competition series. On July 29, 2016, Fox renewed the series for a second season, which premiered on Sunday, June 11, 2017.

== Premise ==
Competitors are divided into four teams of four, each led by a military veteran who is designated as the team's Cadre and compete in a series of Team Challenges. All members of the winning team are safe from elimination and advance to the next round, while a member of each losing team is chosen to participate in an Elimination Challenge. The elimination continues until one contestant quits, fails the challenge, or becomes physically unable to continue, at which point he or she is eliminated from the competition. Eliminated competitors ring a ship's bell on the site before departing, after the tradition of Navy SEAL trainees "ringing out" if they choose to withdraw from the program. In the finale, the remaining competitors take part in an elimination challenge that concludes with a winner being named and receiving a $250,000 cash prize.

Filmed at the foothills of Mount Rainier in Eatonville, Washington, the first season focuses on "pushing teams to the brink" and features 16 contestants with a variety of fitness backgrounds. Competitors who lose during Team Challenges, called "Evolutions", are selected by their own Cadre to participate in the Elimination Challenge. As long as a team has at least two members, a contestant cannot be sent to two consecutive Elimination Challenges. The Elimination Challenge begins with an obstacle course, called "The Circus", followed by an endurance test. The obstacle course remains constant, but the endurance test differs in each episode. The endurance test begins once all three participants have completed the obstacle course, with the first- and second-place finishers receiving an advantage over the third-place finisher, and concludes with the elimination of one competitor. The season finale features an extended Circus where all remaining contestants must participate. This Circus lasts until all members of three teams have dropped out, at which point the remaining members of the last team win $250,000 each. The season was won by Clare Painter and Mark Bouquin of Team Noah.

Taking place in Hampton Island, Georgia in a location referred to as "Camp Grit", the second season focuses on "helping competitors find their grit" and features contestants "who either have lost their grit or never had it". 17 competitors appear at the start of the competition, one of whom is eliminated before the teams are formed. The Cadre of the winning team chooses the members of the losing teams who will be sent to the Elimination Challenge and consecutive appearances are allowed. Only an endurance test is featured in the Elimination Challenge and no advantages are provided to its participants. Depending on the Elimination Challenge, it concludes with one or two contestants being eliminated. The competition eventually becomes contestant-based, with all remaining competitors ultimately competing against each other and only one winner being named. Winning the second season was Gigi Gustin of Team Grady.

== Season 1 ==
=== Cadre ===
- Rorke Denver, a US Navy SEAL Commander who led assault teams worldwide. He also starred in Act of Valor.
- Noah Galloway, a US Army member of the 502nd Infantry and 101st Airborne Division, awarded the Purple Heart when he lost his left arm and left leg in a roadside bomb attack
- Tawanda "Tee" Hanible, a US Marine Corps Gunnery Sergeant
- Nicholas "Nick" Irving, a US Army sniper with the 3rd Ranger Battalion with 33 confirmed kills, nicknamed "The Reaper"

=== Contestants ===
The contestants of Season 1 range in age from 22 to 54.

- Team Nick
- Team Noah
- Team Rorke
- Team Tee

Contestant	Age	Hometown	Nickname	Occupation	Placement
Clare Painter	47	Omak, WA	The Fisherman	Horse trainer and fisherman	Winners
Mark Bouquin	26	Colden, NY	The Lumberjack	Timbersports athlete	Winners
Tony Simmons	41	Chicago, IL	Touchdown Tony	Sports performance coach and former NFL player	3rd place
Jim Vaglica	54	Billerica, MA	The Boston Cop	Police officer	4th place
Tabatha "Goldie" Chandler	39	Chattanooga, TN	The Roller Girl	Registered nurse	5th place
David Neville	31	Fort Wayne, IN	The Olympian	College track and field head coach and former Olympic medalist	6th place
Ashley "Haze" Hazlett	31	Cincinnati, OH	The Marine's Daughter	Event coordinator	7th place
Mario Robinson	25	Queens, NY	The Triathlete	Personal Trainer	8th place
Cameron "Cam" Zagami	22	Salem, NH	The Wrestler	Professional wrestler	9th place
Kimberly Joy "KJoy" Lipson	38	Houston, TX	The Yogi	Yoga instructor	10th place
Ivette Saucedo	35	Los Angeles, CA	The Equestrian	Model	11th place
Lisa Traugott	42	Austin, TX	The Bikini Bodybuilder	Trainer and author	12th place
Maria Kang	35	Elk Grove, CA	The No Excuses Mom	Nonprofit founder and author	13th place
Marc Lobliner	35	Elgin, IL	The Machine	CEO of nutrition company	14th place
Brooke Van Paris	25	Indianapolis, IN	The Obstacle Course Junkie	Sales rep	15th place
Chris Krueger	32	Los Angeles, CA	The Hollywood Trainer	Strength and performance coach	16th place

=== Contestant progress ===
Color key

WINNER	The player or players were the winner(s) of American Grit.
WIN	The player was on the winning team in an Evolution and automatically advanced to the next stage of the competition.
EXEMPT	The player was on a losing team, but was exempt from the Circus due to having been chosen for it in the previous episode.
SAFE	The player was on a losing team in an Evolution, but was not chosen for the Circus.
CIRCUS	The player was on a losing team in an Evolution, competed in the Circus, and advanced.
OUT	The player competed in the Circus and was eliminated.

Contestants	Episodes									
Contestants	1	2	3	4	5	6	7	8	9	10
Clare	WIN	WIN	WIN	WIN	SAFE	WIN	WIN	SAFE	SAFE	WINNER
Mark	WIN	WIN	WIN	WIN	SAFE	WIN	WIN	CIRCUS	EXEMPT	WINNER
Tony	SAFE	SAFE	CIRCUS	EXEMPT	CIRCUS	EXEMPT	CIRCUS	WIN	WIN	OUT
Jim	CIRCUS	EXEMPT	SAFE	SAFE	WIN	CIRCUS	EXEMPT	SAFE	CIRCUS	OUT
Goldie	CIRCUS	EXEMPT	SAFE	SAFE	SAFE	CIRCUS	EXEMPT	CIRCUS	EXEMPT	OUT
David	WIN	WIN	WIN	WIN	SAFE	WIN	WIN	SAFE	CIRCUS	OUT
Haze	SAFE	CIRCUS	EXEMPT	CIRCUS	EXEMPT	SAFE	SAFE	SAFE	SAFE	OUT
Mario	SAFE	SAFE	SAFE	SAFE	CIRCUS	EXEMPT	CIRCUS	EXEMPT	OUT	
Cam	SAFE	SAFE	CIRCUS	EXEMPT	WIN	SAFE	SAFE	OUT		
KJoy	SAFE	CIRCUS	EXEMPT	SAFE	WIN	SAFE	OUT			
Ivette	SAFE	SAFE	SAFE	CIRCUS	EXEMPT	OUT				
Lisa	WIN	WIN	WIN	WIN	OUT					
Maria	SAFE	SAFE	SAFE	OUT						
Marc	SAFE	SAFE	OUT							
Brooke	SAFE	OUT								
Chris	OUT									

=== Episodes ===
No. overall	No. in season	Title	Original release date	U.S. viewers (millions)
1	1	"Ruck Up"	April 14, 2016	2.35
Sixteen competitors are split into teams of four. Led by the Cadre, four retired military members, the teams face the Evolution, which challenges their team skills. Team Noah wins the Evolution, an obstacle course where a log must be carried through holes in walls, carried over three miles, and placed in a locked hole. The other three teams pick Chris (Tee), Goldie (Rorke), and Jim (Nick). The three must hold a rope weighted with a sandbag. Chris drops the bag first, and rings out.: ELIMINATED: Chris Krueger
2	2	"Ice Cubed"	April 21, 2016	2.17
After Chris' departure, the members of Team Tee find themselves one person down. The Evolution involves collecting a raft after climbing over a wall. They must row across a cold lake. Once on the other side, the teams must get a paddle back across the lake, either by opening a locked box, or by bringing the 100-pound lockbox. Team Noah wins again, followed by Team Tee. Tee sends Brooke to the Circus competition, Nick send KJoy, and Rorke sends Haze. Haze sets the record for the fastest time in the Circus. The endurance test is to do ten burpees, then submerge themselves in ice water. After many cycles of doing this, Brooke passes out and is eliminated.: ELIMINATED: Brooke Van Paris
3	3	"Moving Camp"	April 28, 2016	2.10
The teams are challenged to move a full camp and set it up exactly the way they found it. Tee's group, being two members down, finds an advantage because they only have to set up two tents, while the other teams set up four. After packing the equipment into big suitcases, the teams must swim across the lake, build a wheelbarrow, and take all the wheelbarrow parts to the new campsite. Team Noah wins, followed by Team Tee, in the closest finish so far in the season. Tee sends Tony to the Circus, Rorke sends Marc, and Nick sends Cam. The endurance test is to stand on a wooden post, then switch to a higher and narrower post fifteen minutes later. Marc falls off while transitioning to the third and final post, and is eliminated.: ELIMINATED: Marc Lobliner
4	4	"Charlie Foxtrot"	May 5, 2016	1.77
The teams must find and remember eight pictures to put on a board. Team Noah wins once again, extending the winning streak to four. In the Circus, Ivette must go because Tony went the previous week. Nick sends Maria, and Rorke sends Haze (who was the only person to previously face the Circus). Ivette arrives first after rolling over and passing Haze. The endurance portion is to hold onto a band of a pole, then switching to a lower band after 20 minutes. Maria is eliminated after slipping while adjusting back to the higher post.: ELIMINATED: Maria Kang
5	5	"Double Time"	May 12, 2016	1.78
The teams must show survival skills by setting up a tent, purifying water, and making fire tall enough to ignite two flares. Cena then reveals there are two paths: a longer one with easier steps, and a shorter one with harder, longer steps. Team Nick breaks Team Noah's winning streak, by finishing first. In the Circus, Tony is forced to enter, Rorke chooses Mario, and Noah chooses Lisa. The endurance portion is to run laps between logs in under twenty seconds. The time shortens to 15 seconds after the fifteenth lap, and 10 seconds after the twentieth lap. After lap 25, Lisa is unable to touch the log in under ten seconds. She rings out and leaves.: ELIMINATED: Lisa Traugott
6	6	"Squat Till You Drop"	May 19, 2016	1.88
The Evolution involves the teams using supplies to build bridges across various obstacles strewn across a 60-foot long field without their feet touching the ground. If a member's feet touch the ground, they must restart that portion of the obstacle. Team Noah wins the event and regains their confidence. They win a weightlifting workout with Cena as a reward. For the Circus, Team Tee is forced to send Ivette, Team Rorke sends Goldie, and Team Nick sends Jim. The endurance portion involves squatting to fit inside of a three-foot by five-foot frame while balancing a small cylinder on a plank. The first person to drop the cylinder or leave the frame is eliminated. Eventually, Ivette's cylinder falls, and she rings out and leaves.: ELIMINATED: Ivette Saucedo
7	7	"Dawn Patrol"	May 26, 2016	1.73
All the teams receive land navigation compasses, and most teams struggle to learn to use them, but Mark from Team Noah has land nav experience and teaches the rest of the team how to use the device. Early the next morning, the teams are all blindfolded and taken to an unknown location in the woods. From there, they must use the compass and gear they are supplied to locate a checkpoint, solve a navigation problem at the checkpoint to get a map, then carry their gear to the finish. In a close finish, Team Noah wins again and is rewarded with massages. Rorke gives his team gifts of custom ammo shells to help inspire them. At the Circus, Tony is forced to go, while Rorke sends Mario and Nick sends KJoy. The endurance challenge involves carrying sandbags uphill and over a set of steps, and they must move at a constant pace. If a contestant stops or slows down too much, they will be eliminated. After over an hour of this endurance, KJoy cannot go any further and she quits, ringing out and going home.: ELIMINATED: Kimberly Joy "KJoy" Lipson
8	8	"Barricade the Bunker"	June 2, 2016	1.96
At base camp, the teams are told the winners of the next Evolution will win visits from their loved ones. The Evolution involves one team member building a barricade with various materials in thirty minutes around a bunker with flags inside it. After thirty minutes, another team member must attempt to breach an opponent's bunker with a pair of pliers and retrieve their flag. Tony, on his own, barely beats out Mario and wins immunity and a visit from his family. Cam and Haze have a date and Nick is concerned that Haze is playing with Cam's emotions. Tony surprises Haze by sacrificing his reward so that she can visit her father instead. For the Circus, Nick chooses Cam, Rorke chooses Goldie, and Noah chooses Mark. Cena reveals that for this Circus, the military Cadre cannot assist. The endurance challenge involves stilts held together at the top with chains and three sets of increasingly smaller footholds on them. The contestants must climb the stilts and switch to the higher and narrower footholds at Cena's signal. After 45 minutes of this endurance, Cam slips and falls, and he is forced to ring out and go home.: ELIMINATED: Cameron "Cam" Zagami
9	9	"Tired Out"	June 9, 2016	2.11
The Evolution involves obstacles over a five mile course: a tire shuffle, freeing a tire from a puzzle, crawling through a mud pit, and solving another tire puzzle, while each time grabbing a tire and carrying it back to a post at the start/finish line, and teams with multiple members must travel together. Tony wins his second Evolution in a row, guaranteeing him a spot in the finals. The Cadre each bring in a guest military member to give inspirational stories to their teams. Jim is forced to go to the Circus, while Noah sends Mark and Rorke sends Mario, which means by default that Clare and Haze are automatically in the finals, while Mark and Goldie are also automatically in due to being exempt from the Circus this week. The endurance trial involves a ladder that contestants must constantly climb down, under, up, and over within one minute. At the top of the ladder is a button which must be pressed, and the contestants must wait for all other contestants to press the button before the next cycle begins. In a rain-soaked Circus, Mario finishes the course first, but after over 71 rotations, he forgets to hit the button and is eliminated, ringing out and going home. Cena then reveals that the remaining contestants have only 30 minutes to gear up and get ready for the next challenge.: ELIMINATED: Mario Robinson
10	10	"Over the Falls"	June 9, 2016	2.11
The contestants must cross a suspended traverse line hand-over-hand that spans over a 125-foot high waterfall, and for teams with multiple members, the average time of the team will be what counts, with the winning team earning an advantage in the final Circus. Team Noah wins this challenge. Cena explains that the final Circus has been expanded, and he spends some time thanking the remaining contestants before bringing in their family members for a visit. Cena explains that all seven remaining contestants must run the tougher Circus twice, with a fifteen-minute endurance in between the two runs. The endurance involves a rope suspended from a pole with two knots tied into it. After the first run, contestants must hold on via the top knot, and after the second run, they must hold on via the bottom knot. Contestants will be eliminated one after another until one team remains and the remaining members of that team will be the winners. Team Noah's advantage is a one-minute head start in the first run, which they use to gain the advantage in the first endurance. All teams make it through to the second run, and Tony from Team Tee finishes it first, Jim from Team Nick finishes second, Team Noah is third, and Team Rorke finishes fourth. Haze drops out in seventh place, David finishes in sixth, Goldie drops out in fifth and eliminates Team Rorke. Jim drops out next in fourth and eliminates Team Nick. After over 90 minutes of endurance, Tony drops out in third place eliminating Team Tee, and giving the win and the $250,000 prize to both Clare and Mark from Team Noah.: ELIMINATED: Ashley "Haze" Hazlett, David Neville, Tabatha "Goldie" Chandler, Jim Vaglica, Tony Simmons; WINNERS: Clare Painter and Mark Bouquin

=== Ratings ===
Viewership and ratings per episode of American Grit
No.	Title	Air date	Rating/share (18–49)	Viewers (millions)	DVR (18–49)	DVR viewers (millions)	Total (18–49)	Total viewers (millions)
1	"Ruck Up"	April 14, 2016	0.8/3	2.35	—N/a	—N/a	—N/a	—N/a
2	"Ice Cubed"	April 21, 2016	0.7/2	2.17	—N/a	—N/a	—N/a	—N/a
3	"Moving Camp"	April 28, 2016	0.7/2	2.10	—N/a	—N/a	—N/a	—N/a
4	"Charlie Foxtrot"	May 5, 2016	0.6/2	1.77	—N/a	—N/a	—N/a	—N/a
5	"Double Time"	May 12, 2016	0.6/2	1.78	—N/a	—N/a	—N/a	—N/a
6	"Squat Till You Drop"	May 19, 2016	0.6/2	1.88	—N/a	—N/a	—N/a	—N/a
7	"Dawn Patrol"	May 26, 2016	0.5/2	1.73	0.2	0.53	0.7	2.26
8	"Barricade the Bunker"	June 2, 2016	0.6/2	1.96	0.3	0.55	0.9	2.51
9	"Tired Out"	June 9, 2016	0.7/3	2.11	0.2	0.47	0.9	2.58
10	"Over the Falls"	June 9, 2016	0.7/3	2.11	0.2	0.47	0.9	2.58

== Season 2 ==
=== Cadre ===
- John Burk, a US Army Infantry Drill Sergeant who served in Iraq and Afghanistan and also trained younger soldiers for battle, now an entrepreneur
- Riki Long, a US Marine who was in charge of the legal administration at the largest Marine Corps personnel center, now a fitness nutrition specialist and weightlifter
- Chloe Mondesir, a US Marine Ammunition Technician, now working with a non-profit organization to raise money for Veteran Affairs programs
- Grady Powell, a US Army Green Beret with the 10th Special Forces Group with tours in Iraq and Africa, now runs a firearms training facility. He also won NBC's reality television program Stars Earn Stripes alongside 2007 WWE Diva Search winner and former WWE Divas Champion Eve Torres.

=== Contestants ===
The second season contains 17 contestants, ranging in age from 20 to 48.

- Team Chloe
- Team Grady
- Team Burk
- Team Riki
- Eliminated before teams chosen

Contestant	Age	Hometown	Occupation	Placement
Gigi Gustin	20	Glassboro, NJ	Sales associate	Winner
Michael Wilson Morgan	38	Brooklyn, NY	Costume designer	Runner-up
Hannah Koen	23	Newburyport, MA	Housewife	3rd place
Herman Brar	26	Billings, MT	Nurse	4th place
Chris Edom	48	Merrick, NY	Kindergarten teacher	5th place
Alison Kempkey	36	Seattle, WA	Fashion consultant	6th place
George Foreman IV^{1}	28	Houston, TX	Publicist	7th place
Carla Mireles	26	Chino, CA	Account executive	8th place
Richard Mallard	32	Berryville, TX	Vlogger	9th place
Janessa Morgan	36	Los Angeles, CA	Telecommunications manager	10th place
Scarlett Angelina	24	New Brunswick, NJ	Public relations coordinator	11th place
Melanie Mahanna	29	Brooklyn, NY	Tutor	12th place
Shermon Braithwaite	22	Brooklyn, NY	Hotel clerk	13th place
Will Westwater	23	West Hollywood, CA	Swimming instructor	14th place
Gill Morton	36	Vernal, UT	Yoga instructor	15th place
Nathalie Martin	45	Youngsville, LA	Cleaning business owner	16th place
Heather Pincelli	36	Lakeland, FL	Private investigator	17th place

^Note 1George was originally on Team Grady, but later became a member of Team Burk.

=== Contestant progress ===
Color key

WINNER	The player was the winner of American Grit.
RUNNER-UP	The player finished in second place and was the runner-up of American Grit.
WIN	The player was on the winning team in a Team Challenge and automatically advanced to the next stage of the competition.
SAFE	The player was on a losing team in a Team Challenge, but was not chosen for the Elimination Challenge.
LOW	The player was on a losing team in a Team Challenge, competed in the Elimination Challenge, and advanced.
OUT	The player competed in the Elimination Challenge and was eliminated.
CHOSEN	The player was saved by being chosen to be on a team by one of the Cadre.
OUT	The player was eliminated before teams were chosen, being the sole contestant to not be chosen for a team.

Contestants	Episodes										
Contestants	1	2	3	4	5	6	7	8	9	10	
Gigi	CHOSEN	SAFE	WIN	WIN	SAFE	SAFE	WIN	SAFE	WIN	SAFE	WINNER
Michael	CHOSEN	SAFE	WIN	WIN	SAFE	SAFE	WIN	SAFE	WIN	WIN	RUNNER-UP
Hannah	CHOSEN	WIN	LOW	SAFE	SAFE	WIN	SAFE	SAFE	LOW	SAFE	OUT
Herman	CHOSEN	SAFE	WIN	WIN	LOW	LOW	WIN	LOW	WIN	OUT	
Chris	CHOSEN	WIN	SAFE	SAFE	SAFE	WIN	LOW	SAFE	OUT		
Alison	CHOSEN	SAFE	SAFE	SAFE	WIN	SAFE	LOW	WIN	OUT		
George	CHOSEN	LOW	WIN	WIN	SAFE	SAFE	SAFE	OUT			
Carla	CHOSEN	SAFE	SAFE	LOW	LOW	SAFE	SAFE	OUT			
Richard	CHOSEN	SAFE	SAFE	SAFE	SAFE	SAFE	OUT				
Janessa	CHOSEN	SAFE	LOW	SAFE	WIN	OUT					
Scarlett	CHOSEN	SAFE	SAFE	SAFE	SAFE	OUT					
Melanie	CHOSEN	WIN	SAFE	SAFE	OUT						
Shermon	CHOSEN	SAFE	SAFE	OUT							
Will	CHOSEN	WIN	SAFE	OUT							
Gill	CHOSEN	LOW	OUT								
Nathalie	CHOSEN	OUT									
Heather	OUT										

=== Episodes ===
No. overall	No. in season	Title	Original release date	U.S. viewers (millions)
11	1	"Find Your Grit"	June 11, 2017	1.11
At the new location known as Camp Grit, John Cena and the new Cadre meet the 17 new competitors. Cena tells them that there are only 16 beds in the cabin, and that one contestant will go home before the team challenges start. The contestants race around a lake to claim one of the beds. The next day, the contestants are hung upside down over a lake, and the first person to give up will be eliminated. After over 30 minutes of the players being repeatedly dunked in the lake, no one gives up, and Cena ends the contest with no one eliminated. On day three, the contestants must spin a beach ball over their heads until the Cadre pick them for a team and only 16 players will be on the teams. Eventually, Heather is not chosen for a team and she is eliminated.: ELIMINATED: Heather Pincelli
12	2	"Cena Does the Dishes"	June 18, 2017	1.67
The four teams must complete a relay race where they must pass through a gate and get a flag then plant the flags at the finish line. In addition, when a gate is reached, one of the team members must complete a task of either putting on a shock collar, drinking a liquefied alligator tail, or stripping naked. Team Burk wins the race, but Cena tells them they will not be immune unless the fourth member who did not complete a task has their head shaved. Melanie agrees to have her head shaved and thus Team Burk wins immunity and Burk gets to choose one member of the other three teams for the Elimination Challenge. He chooses Nathalie, George, and Gill. The Elimination Challenge has the contestants hold a bar while standing inside a frame suspended over the lake. Every 15 minutes, the frame will be tilted forward. The first person to drop will be eliminated. Nathalie drops out first, ending her day.: ELIMINATED: Nathalie Martin
13	3	"Liar Liar"	June 25, 2017	1.00
The Team Challenge has the four teams blindfolded and in a canoe race where they must navigate a series of gates while being led by one member designated as team captain who is able to see. Team Grady wins the race and Grady chooses the other three team captains, Gill, Janessa, and Hannah, for the Elimination Challenge. In this challenge, the contestants have a set of four wheels slightly separate from one another which they must constantly keep spinning. The first contestant to have a wheel stop spinning is eliminated. After over an hour of endurance, one of Gill's wheels stops turning and she is eliminated.: ELIMINATED: Gill Morton
14	4	"Secrets Are Revealed"	July 2, 2017	1.04
Cena advises the contestants that this week will have a double elimination. The Team Challenge has the members tethered together at the waist by a rope and they must complete a muddy race through a swamp. Team Grady wins the challenge, but Hannah from Team Burke is injured. She receives medical attention and is okay the next day. Grady selects Carla, Shermon, and Will for the Elimination Challenge. This challenge has the contestants balance on a platform while holding a ball over their heads suspended over the lake. When the ball is let go, it will swing into a bell to signal the elimination of that contestant. After an hour, Will loses control of the ball and is eliminated. After three hours, Shermon loses control of the ball and is also eliminated.: ELIMINATED: Will Westwater and Shermon Braithwaite
15	5	"Camp Love"	July 9, 2017	1.10
The Team Challenge has the members releasing triangle-shaped puzzle pieces that must be placed on stakes to spell out the words love, money, or power. If the winning team spells love, they win a visit from their families, while spelling money wins the team $1,000 each, and spelling power gives the team the ability to move members around. Team Chloe wins by spelling out love, and they earn a visit from their families. Chloe chooses Carla, Herman, and Melanie for the Elimination Challenge. In this challenge, there is an hourglass filled with sand which will slowly drain out. The competitors must repeatedly cross a balance beam and refill the sand using either a small bag or a larger bucket with holes in it. They also have one bucket of sand near the hourglass for a single use. The contestant whose hourglass drains out first is eliminated. Eventually, Melanie's hourglass empties and she is sent home.: ELIMINATED: Melanie Mahanna
16	6	"Selfish vs. Selfless"	July 16, 2017	0.95
Cena tells the Cadre that they will not be beside their team for the challenge. The challenge tasks each individual to pick whether they would choose to do something for the team (worth more points) or something personally for themselves (worth less points). Team Burk wins and also gets the reward to steal someone from another team, while Carla secures a safety which grants her next week free of elimination. Chris, having won the reward for his team, takes George from Grady's team. Burk sends Janessa, Scarlett, and Herman to the Elimination Challenge, which is a double elimination this week. The challenge is to hold on to an outcrop on a 45° slope with water running down it. Scarlett slides into the water and has to ring out, while an hour later, Janessa does too. Cena then reveals if all of one Cadre's team has rung out, the Cadre too must ring out.: ELIMINATED: Scarlett Angelina and Janessa Morgan
17	7	"Role Reversal"	July 23, 2017	1.14
This week's challenge looks nearly identical to the last Elimination Challenge in that there is a 45° slope with water running down it and a handle at the top, but this time, the Cadre are the ones who will participate. Grady wins the challenge and his team selects Richard, Alison, and Chris for the Elimination Challenge. In this challenge, three floating balls are under ropes, and the contestants must balance on the balls while using the ropes to prevent floating away. The first one to drop will be eliminated. Richard falls quickly and is sent home.: ELIMINATED: Richard Mallard
18	8	"Shady Grady"	July 30, 2017	1.15
For this week's Team Challenge there is a rotating set of four basketball hoops on one end of a court, a pile of colored balls on another, and large bungee cords in the middle. The contestants must run with the bungee attached to them to grab a ball then shoot it into an opponent's colored basket. The first three teams that have five balls in their baskets will go to elimination, which this week is another double elimination. Alison secures the win for Team Chloe. By default, Carla is sent to elimination while Allison selects George and Herman. In this challenge, the competitors are harnessed to an underwater pulley system which supports a box that holds 50% of each competitor's weight. They must hold on to a rope while in the water to support the box. The first two competitors to let go will both be eliminated. Carla drops out first, eliminating Team Riki altogether. After over 50 minutes, George loses his grip and is eliminated.: ELIMINATED: Carla Mireles and George Foreman IV
19	9	"Cena Says"	August 6, 2017	1.01
With Riki's team being eliminated, Riki becomes the first-ever Cadre to ring out. Cena visits the contestants and shares with them a story with details about his life. For the Team Challenge, Cena quizzes the contestants about details of his story, and they must slide down a ramp into a mud pit to grab a tile with the correct answer, then return it to the start. The first team with four correct answers is safe from another double elimination. Team Grady wins the challenge. All members of the other teams must compete in the Elimination Challenge. This challenge has the contestants balance a weighted ball on a shelf while also balancing themselves on an unstable platform. After ten minutes, they must transition to another platform that is more unstable. The first two contestants to drop their balls will be eliminated. After about 36 minutes, Alison drops her ball, thus also eliminating Team Chloe. A few minutes later, Chris drops his ball and is also eliminated.: ELIMINATED: Alison Kempkey and Chris Edom
20	10	"Who's Got Grit?"	August 6, 2017	1.01
Cena tells the remaining contestants that they are now competing as individuals and their Cadre can no longer assist them. In the first challenge, the contestants have a puzzle where every piece is the face of a former contestant, and they must put them in the order that they were eliminated. Michael solves the puzzle first, and he gets to choose two other people to compete with him in the finals. He chooses Hannah and Gigi to move on, thus eliminating Herman.: ELIMINATED: Herman Brar; For the final challenge, the contestants are suspended over the lake while holding on to a crossbar. They will be quizzed on facts that occurred during the course of the season, and must answer them by releasing either their left or right hand. Getting a wrong answer results in a penalty of holding the bar with one hand for three minutes. The last competitor to hold on will be the winner. After over an hour, Hannah loses her grip and is eliminated in third place. After over two hours, Cena runs out of trivia questions and forces the two contestants to hold on with one hand for the remainder. Michael loses his grip and is eliminated, making Gigi the winner of season two of American Grit and the $250,000 prize.: ELIMINATED: Hannah Koen; RUNNER-UP: Michael Wilson Morgan; WINNER: Gigi Gustin

=== Ratings ===
Viewership and ratings per episode of American Grit
No.	Title	Air date	Rating/share (18–49)	Viewers (millions)	DVR (18–49)	DVR viewers (millions)	Total (18–49)	Total viewers (millions)
1	"Find Your Grit"	June 11, 2017	0.4/2	1.11	0.2	0.47	0.6	1.58
2	"Cena Does the Dishes"	June 18, 2017	0.5/2	1.67	0.2	0.47	0.7	2.14
3	"Liar Liar"	June 25, 2017	0.4/2	1.00	0.1	0.44	0.5	1.43
4	"Secrets Are Revealed"	July 2, 2017	0.4/2	1.04	—N/a	—N/a	—N/a	—N/a
5	"Camp Love"	July 9, 2017	0.4/2	1.10	—N/a	—N/a	—N/a	—N/a
6	"Selfish vs. Selfless"	July 16, 2017	0.4/2	0.95	0.1	0.44	0.5	1.39
7	"Role Reversal"	July 23, 2017	0.4/2	1.14	—N/a	—N/a	—N/a	—N/a
8	"Shady Grady"	July 30, 2017	0.4/2	1.15	—N/a	—N/a	—N/a	—N/a
9	"Cena Says"	August 6, 2017	0.4/2	1.01	—N/a	—N/a	—N/a	—N/a
10	"Who's Got Grit?"	August 6, 2017	0.4/2	1.01	—N/a	—N/a	—N/a	—N/a

== Awards and honors ==
Year	Category	Nominee(s)	Episode	Result
2016	Directors Guild of America Award for Outstanding Directing – Reality Programs	J. Rupert Thompson	"Over the Falls"	Won
