= 66th Directors Guild of America Awards =

- Date: January 25, 2014
- Location: Hyatt Regency Century Plaza, Los Angeles, California
- Country: United States
- Presented by: Directors Guild of America
- Hosted by: Jane Lynch

Highlights
- Best Director Feature Film: Gravity – Alfonso Cuarón
- Best Director Documentary: The Square – Jehane Noujaim
- Website: https://www.dga.org/Awards/History/2010s/2013.aspx?value=2013

The 66th Directors Guild of America Awards, honoring the outstanding directorial achievements in films, documentary and television in 2013, were presented on January 25, 2014, at the Hyatt Regency Century Plaza. The ceremony was hosted by Jane Lynch. The nominees for the feature film category were announced on January 7, 2014, the nominations for the television and commercial categories were announced on January 9, 2014, and the nominees for documentary directing were announced on January 13, 2014.

== Winners and nominees ==
=== Film ===
Feature Film

Alfonso Cuarón – Gravity

- Paul Greengrass – Captain Phillips
- Steve McQueen – 12 Years a Slave
- David O. Russell – American Hustle
- Martin Scorsese – The Wolf of Wall Street
Documentaries

Jehane Noujaim – The Square

- Zachary Heinzerling – Cutie and the Boxer
- Joshua Oppenheimer – The Act of Killing
- Sarah Polley – Stories We Tell
- Lucy Walker – The Crash Reel

=== Television ===
Drama Series

Vince Gilligan – Breaking Bad for "Felina"

- Bryan Cranston – Breaking Bad for "Blood Money"
- David Fincher – House of Cards for "Chapter 1"
- Lesli Linka Glatter – Homeland for "The Star"
- David Nutter – Game of Thrones for "The Rains of Castamere"
Comedy Series

Beth McCarthy-Miller – 30 Rock for "Hogcock!" / "Last Lunch"

- Mark Cendrowski – The Big Bang Theory for "The Hofstadter Insufficiency"
- Bryan Cranston – Modern Family for "The Old Man & the Tree"
- Gail Mancuso – Modern Family for "My Hero"
- Anthony Rich – The Big Bang Theory for "The Love Spell Potential"
Miniseries or TV Film

Steven Soderbergh – Behind the Candelabra

- Stephen Frears – Muhammad Ali's Greatest Fight
- David Mamet – Phil Spector
- Beth McCarthy-Miller and Rob Ashford – The Sound of Music Live!
- Nelson McCormick – Killing Kennedy
Variety/Talk/News/Sports – Regularly Scheduled Programming

Don Roy King – Saturday Night Live for "Host: Justin Timberlake"

- Dave Diomedi – Late Night with Jimmy Fallon for "#799"
- Andy Fisher – Jimmy Kimmel Live! for "#13-1810"
- Jim Hoskinson – The Colbert Report for "#10004"
- Chuck O'Neil – The Daily Show with John Stewart for "#19018"
Variety/Talk/News/Sports – Specials

Glenn Weiss – The 67th Annual Tony Awards

- Louis C.K. – Louis C.K.: Oh My God
- Joel Gallen – 2013 Rock and Roll Hall of Fame Induction Ceremony
- Louis J. Horvitz – The 55th Annual Grammy Awards
- Don Mischer – The 85th Annual Academy Awards
Reality Programs

Neil P. DeGroot – 72 Hours for "The Lost Coast"

- Matthew Bartley – The Biggest Loser for "Episode #1501"
- Paul Starkman – Top Chef for "Glacial Gourmand"
- J. Rupert Thompson – The Hero for "Teamwork"
- Bertram van Munster – The Amazing Race for "Beards in the Wind"
Children's Programs

Amy Schatz – An Apology to Elephants

- Stephen Herek – Jinxed
- Jeffrey Hornaday – Teen Beach Movie
- Jonathan Judge – Swindle
- Adam Weissman – A.N.T. Farm for "influANTces"

=== Commercials ===
Commercials

Martin de Thurah – Hennessy V.S' "The Man Who Couldn't Slow Down" and Acura's "Human Race"

- Fredrik Bond – Heineken's "Voyage" and Johnnie Walker's "From The Future"
- John X. Carey – Dove's "Real Beauty Sketches"
- Noam Murro – Guinness' "Basketball", DirecTV's "Kids", and Volkswagen's "Mask"
- Matthijs van Heijningen – PlayStation's "Perfect Day" and Verizon's "#Forty Eight"

=== Frank Capra Achievement Award ===
- Lee Blaine

=== Robert B. Aldrich Service Award ===
- Steven Soderbergh

=== Franklin J. Schaffner Achievement Award ===
- Vince DeDario

=== Diversity Award ===
- Shonda Rhimes
- Betsy Beers
