= Bug Juice: My Adventures at Camp =

2018 American TV series

- Genre: Docuseries
- Created by: Douglas Ross; J. Rupert Thompson
- Theme music composer: Michael Baiardi
- Composer: Michael Baiardi
- Country of origin: United States
- Original language: English
- No. of seasons: 1
- No. of episodes: 16

Production
- Executive producers: Douglas Ross; Alex Baskin; Tina Gazzero Clapp; Toni Gallagher; Brian McCarthy
- Cinematography: Benjamin Wolf
- Running time: 22 minutes
- Production company: Evolution Media

Original release
- Network: Disney Channel
- Release: July 16 – August 9, 2018

Related
- Bug Juice (1998–2001)

Bug Juice: My Adventures at Camp is an American docuseries that premiered on Disney Channel on July 16, 2018. It is a revival of the original Bug Juice program that aired on Disney Channel from February 28, 1998 to October 15, 2001.

== Production ==
On August 4, 2017, Disney Channel announced that production was underway for a relaunch of Bug Juice, a docuseries that aired from February 28, 1998 to October 15, 2001. Production took place at Camp Waziyatah in Waterford, Maine, the location of the first season of the original program, with an expected premiere in early 2018. On April 19, 2018, it was announced that the relaunched program would be titled Bug Juice: My Adventures at Camp, and would premiere in summer 2018. The program premiered on July 16, 2018. Douglas Ross, Alex Baskin, Tina Gazzero Clapp, and Toni Gallagher serve as executive producers. The program is produced by Evolution Media. The first season consists of 16 episodes. On July 12, 2018, Disney Channel released the theme song for the program on YouTube.

== Episodes ==
No.	Title	Original release date	Prod. code	U.S. viewers (millions)
1	"Wazi, Wazi, Waziyatah!"	July 16, 2018	101	0.57
2	"The S'more the Better"	July 17, 2018	102	0.53
3	"TJ vs. the Blob"	July 18, 2018	103	0.42
4	"Tacos for Breakfast"	July 19, 2018	104	0.54
5	"Friendship vs. Zombies"	July 23, 2018	105	0.56
6	"Getting Sketch-y"	July 24, 2018	106	0.56
7	"It's On!"	July 25, 2018	107	0.49
8	"Later, Taters!"	July 26, 2018	108	0.45
9	"Fishing for Friends"	July 30, 2018	109	0.43
10	"Everyday I'm Paddlin'"	July 31, 2018	110	0.39
11	"Taco of Terror"	August 1, 2018	111	0.48
12	"Try, Try (Try) Again"	August 2, 2018	112	0.45
13	"Fables and Tables"	August 6, 2018	113	0.56
14	"Challenge Makers, Ankle Breakers and Breakout Fakers"	August 7, 2018	114	0.62
15	"The Quest for the Cup"	August 8, 2018	115	0.70
16	"Best Summer Ever!"	August 9, 2018	116	0.54

== Ratings ==
Viewership and ratings per season of Bug Juice: My Adventures at Camp
Season	Episodes	First aired		Last aired		Avg. viewers (millions)	18–49 rank
Season	Episodes	Date	Viewers (millions)	Date	Viewers (millions)	Avg. viewers (millions)	18–49 rank
1	16	July 16, 2018	0.57	August 9, 2018	0.54	0.52	TBD
