= Directors Guild of America Award for Outstanding Directorial Achievement in Reality Programs =

Annual award for television directing

- Awarded for: Outstanding Directorial Achievement in Reality Programs
- Country: United States
- Presented by: Directors Guild of America
- First award: 2005
- Currently held by: Neil DeGroot for Gordon Ramsay: Uncharted (2024)

The Directors Guild of America Award for Outstanding Directorial Achievement in Reality Programs is one of the annual Directors Guild of America Awards given by the Directors Guild of America. It was first awarded at the 58th Directors Guild of America Awards in 2006.

== Winners and nominees ==
=== 2000s ===
Year	Program	Episode	Winners and nominees	Network	Ref.
2005 (58th)	Three Wishes	"Episode #101"	Tony Croll	NBC	
2005 (58th)	Fear Factor	"Heist Fear Factor"	J. Rupert Thompson	NBC	
2005 (58th)	Brat Camp	"Episode #104"	Ross Breitenbach	ABC	
2005 (58th)	Penn & Teller: Bullshit!	"Circumcision"	Starling Price	Showtime	
2005 (58th)	The Amazing Race	"Episode #805"	Bertram van Munster	CBS	
2006 (59th)	Treasure Hunters	"Episode #101"	Tony Sacco	NBC	
2006 (59th)	Texas Ranch House	"The Good, the Bad and the Colonel"	Bobbie Birleffi	PBS	
2006 (59th)	Fear Factor	"Military Fear Factor"	J. Rupert Thompson	NBC	
2006 (59th)	The Amazing Race	"Episode #1002"	Bertram van Munster	CBS	
2006 (59th)	Pros vs. Joes	"Episode #101"	Tim Warren	Spike	
2007 (60th)	The Amazing Race	"Episode #1110"	Bertram van Munster	CBS	
2007 (60th)	Who Wants to Be a Superhero?	"Episode #208"	Craig Borders	Sci Fi	
2007 (60th)	Shooting Sizemore	"Episode #101"	Tony Croll	VH1	
2007 (60th)	Pros vs. Joes	"Episode #201"	Scott Messick	Spike	
2007 (60th)	Project Runway	"Fashion Giant"	Tony Sacco	Bravo	
2008 (61st)	America's Next Top Model	"Episode #1002"	Tony Croll	CW	
2008 (61st)	Pros vs. Joes	"Episode #301"	Scott Messick	Spike	
2008 (61st)	Estate of Panic	"That Sinking Feeling"	J. Rupert Thompson	Sci Fi	
2008 (61st)	The Amazing Race	"Episode #1303"	Bertram van Munster	CBS	
2008 (61st)	I Survived a Japanese Game Show	"A Long Way From Home"	Kent Weed	ABC	
2009 (62nd)	Extreme Engineering	"Hong Kong Bridge"	Craig Borders	Discovery Channel	
2009 (62nd)	Dog Whisperer with Cesar Millan	"Puppy Mills Exposed"	Sueann Fincke	Nat Geo	
2009 (62nd)	The Next Iron Chef	"Episode #201"	Eytan Keller	Food Network	
2009 (62nd)	Six Beers of Separation		Zach Merck	Foxtel	
2009 (62nd)	The Amazing Race	"Don't Let a Cheese Hit Me"	Bertram van Munster	CBS	

=== 2010s ===
Year	Program	Episode	Winners and nominees	Network	Ref.
2010 (63rd)	The Next Iron Chef	"Episode #301"	Eytan Keller	Food Network	
2010 (63rd)	The Hills	"Episode #601"	Hisham Abed	MTV	
2010 (63rd)	Private Chefs of Beverly Hills	"Challah Back"	Bryan O'Donnell	Food Network	
2010 (63rd)	MasterChef	"Episode #103"	Brian Smith	Fox	
2010 (63rd)	The Amazing Race	"I Think We're Fighting the Germans. Right?"	Bertram van Munster	CBS	
2011 (64th)	The Biggest Loser	"Episode #1115"	Neil P. DeGroot	NBC	
2011 (64th)	The Next Iron Chef: Super Chefs	"Episode #401"	Eytan Keller	Food Network	
2011 (64th)	MasterChef	"Episode #201"	Brian Smith	Fox	
2011 (64th)	Fear Factor 2.0	"Scorpion Tales"	J. Rupert Thompson	NBC	
2011 (64th)	The Amazing Race	"You Don't Get Paid Unless You Win?"	Bertram van Munster	CBS	
2012 (65th)	MasterChef	"Episode #305"	Brian Smith	Fox	
2012 (65th)	America's Next Top Model	"The Girl Who Becomes America's Next Top Model"	Tony Croll	CW	
2012 (65th)	Face Off	"Scene of the Crime"	Peter Ney	Syfy	
2012 (65th)	Stars Earn Stripes	"Amphibious Assault"	J. Rupert Thompson	NBC	
2012 (65th)	Ink Master	"Episode #103"	Tim Warren	Spike	
2013 (66th)	72 Hours	"The Lost Coast"	Neil P. DeGroot	TNT	
2013 (66th)	The Biggest Loser	"Episode #1501"	Matthew Bartley	NBC	
2013 (66th)	Top Chef	"Glacial Gourmand"	Paul Starkman	Bravo	
2013 (66th)	The Hero	"Teamwork"	J. Rupert Thompson	TNT	
2013 (66th)	The Amazing Race	"Beards in the Wind"	Bertram van Munster	CBS	
2014 (67th)	The Chair	"The Test"	Tony Sacco	Starz	
2014 (67th)	The Quest	"One True Hero"	Bertram van Munster, Jack Cannon, and Elise Doganieri	ABC	
2014 (67th)	The Biggest Loser	"Episode #1613"	Neil P. DeGroot	NBC	
2014 (67th)	Top Chef	"The First Thanksgiving"	Steve Hryniewicz	Bravo	
2014 (67th)	Steve Austin's Broken Skull Challenge	"Welcome to the Gun Show"	Adam Vetri	CMT	
2015 (68th)	Steve Austin's Broken Skull Challenge	"Gods of War"	Adam Vetri	CMT	
2015 (68th)	The Great Christmas Light Fight	"Episode #304"	Brady Connell	ABC	
2015 (68th)	Shark Tank	"Episode #702"	Ken Fuchs	ABC	
2015 (68th)	Cutthroat Kitchen	"Superstar Sabotage Finale: It's Raining Ramen"	Steve Hryniewicz	Food Network	
2015 (68th)	The Amazing Race	"Bring the Fun, Baby!"	Bertram van Munster	CBS	
2016 (69th)	American Grit	"Over the Falls"	J. Rupert Thompson	Fox	
2016 (69th)	Shark Tank	"Episode #801"	Ken Fuchs	ABC	
2016 (69th)	Live PD	"Episode 5"	John Gonzalez	A&E	
2016 (69th)	Strong	"Welcome to Strong"	Brian Smith	NBC	
2016 (69th)	The Amazing Race	"We're Only Doing Freaky Stuff Today"	Bertram van Munster	CBS	
2017 (70th)	MasterChef	"Vegas Deluxe & Oyster Schucks"	Brian Smith	Fox	
2017 (70th)	Encore!	"Pilot"	Hisham Abed	ABC	
2017 (70th)	Live PD	"Episode 50"	John Gonzalez	A&E	
2017 (70th)	Dare to Live	"Chainsmokers"	Adam Vetri	MTV	
2017 (70th)	Spartan: Ultimate Team Challenge	"Season Premiere"	Kent Weed	NBC	
2018 (71st)	The Final Table	"Japan"	Russell Norman	Netflix	
2018 (71st)	The Amazing Race	"It's Just a Million Dollars, No Pressure"	Bertram van Munster	CBS	
2018 (71st)	American Ninja Warrior	"Miami City Qualifiers"	Patrick McManus	NBC	
2018 (71st)	Better Late Than Never	"How Do You Say Roots in German?"	Neil P. DeGroot	NBC	
2018 (71st)	Iron Chef Gauntlet	"Episode 201"	Eytan Keller	Food Network	
2019 (72nd)	Encore!	"Annie"	Jason Cohen	Disney+	
2019 (72nd)	American Ninja Warrior	"#1116: Las Vegas National Finals Night 4"	Patrick McManus	NBC	
2019 (72nd)	The Chef Show	"Hog Island"	Jon Favreau	Netflix	
2019 (72nd)	First Responders Live	"#103"	Ashley S. Gorman	Fox	
2019 (72nd)	Queer Eye	"Black Girl Magic"	Hisham Abed	Netflix	

=== 2020s ===
Year	Program	Episode	Winners and nominees	Network	Ref.
2020 (73rd)	Full Bloom	"Petal to the Metal"	Joseph Guidry	HBO Max	
2020 (73rd)	The Chef Show	"Tartine"	Jon Favreau	Netflix	
2020 (73rd)	Lego Masters	"Mega City Block"	Rich Kim	Fox	
2020 (73rd)	Shark Tank	"Episode #1211"	Ken Fuchs	ABC	
2020 (73rd)	Eco Challenge	"3, 2, 1...Go!"	David Charles	Amazon	
2021 (74th)	Getaway Driver	"Electric Shock"	Adam Vetri	Discovery Channel	
2021 (74th)	American Ninja Warrior	"1304: Qualifiers 4"	Patrick McManus	NBC	
2021 (74th)	Full Bloom	"Final Floral Face Off"	Joseph Guidry	HBO Max	
2021 (74th)	Making the Cut	"Brand Statement"	Ramy Romany	Amazon	
2021 (74th)	Running Wild with Bear Grylls	"Gina Carano In The Dolomites"	Ben Simms	NatGeo	
2022 (75th)	Running Wild with Bear Grylls	"Florence Pugh in the Volcanic Rainforests of Costa Rica"	Ben Simms	NatGeo	
2022 (75th)	The Big Brunch	"Carb Loading Brunch"	Joseph Guidry	HBO Max	
2022 (75th)	FBOY Island	"Do You Like Cats?"	Michael Shea	HBO Max	
2022 (75th)	The Go-Big Show	"Only One Can Win"	Carrie Havel	TBS	
2022 (75th)	Lego Masters	"Jurass-brick World"	Rich Kim	Fox	
2023 (76th)	Rainn Wilson and the Geography of Bliss	"Happiness is a Bottle of Cod Liver Oil"	Niharika Desai	Peacock	
2023 (76th)	American Ninja Warrior	"Season 15 Finale"	Patrick McManus	NBC	
2023 (76th)	The Golden Bachelor	"Premiere"	Ken Fuchs	ABC	
2023 (76th)	Lego Masters	"Is It Brick?"	Rich Kim	Fox	
2023 (76th)	Project Greenlight: A New Generation	"PGL vs. Gray Matter Problem"	Joseph Guidry and Alexandra Lipsitz	HBO	
2024 (77th)	Gordon Ramsay: Uncharted	"The Cliffs of Ireland"	Neil DeGroot	National Geographic Channel	
2024 (77th)	American Ninja Warrior	"Las Vegas Finals 4"	Patrick McManus	NBC	
2024 (77th)	Conan O'Brien Must Go	"Ireland"	Mike Sweeney	Max	
2024 (77th)	Deal or No Deal Island	"Are You Decisive?"	Joseph Guidry	NBC	
2024 (77th)	Jerrod Carmichael Reality Show	"Road Trip"	Ari Katcher	HBO	

== Programs with multiple awards ==
2 awards

- MasterChef

== Programs with multiple nominations ==
11 nominations

- The Amazing Race

5 nominations

- American Ninja Warrior

4 nominations

- MasterChef

3 nominations

- Fear Factor
- Pros vs. Joes
- The Biggest Loser
- Lego Masters
- The Next Iron Chef
- Shark Tank

2 nominations

- America's Next Top Model
- The Chef Show
- Encore!
- Full Bloom
- Live PD
- Running Wild with Bear Grylls
- Steve Austin's Broken Skull Challenge
- Top Chef

== Individuals with multiple awards ==
3 awards

- Neil P. DeGroot

2 awards

- Tony Croll
- Neil P. DeGroot
- Adam Vetri

== Individuals with multiple nominations ==
12 nominations

- Bertram van Munster

7 nominations

- J. Rupert Thompson

5 nominations

- Neil P. DeGroot
- Joseph Guidry
- Patrick McManus
- Brian Smith

4 nominations

- Tony Croll
- Ken Fuchs
- Eytan Keller
- Adam Vetri

3 nominations

- Hisham Abed
- Rich Kim
- Tony Sacco

2 nominations

- Jon Favreau
- Ben Simms

== Total awards by network ==
- NBC – 4
- Fox – 3
- Discovery Channel – 2
- NatGeo – 2
- CBS – 1
- CMT – 1
- CW – 1
- Disney+ – 1
- Food Network – 1
- HBO Max – 1
- Netflix – 1
- Peacock – 1
- Starz – 1
- TNT – 1
