= Rich Kim =

American television director

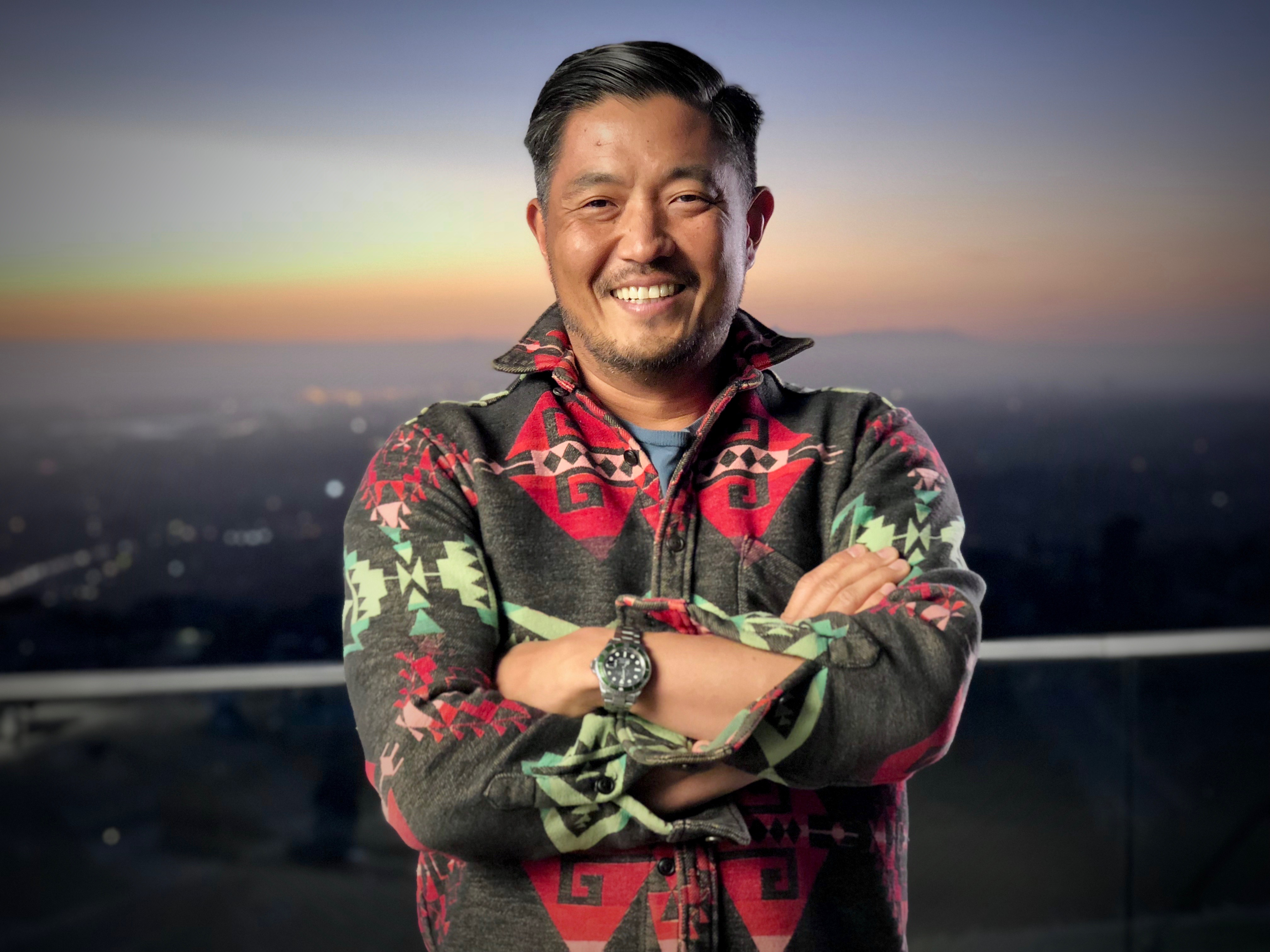
- Born: Sturgis, Michigan, U.S.
- Education: University of Illinois Chicago; American Film Institute
- Occupations: Television director, producer
- Notable work: Knife Fight

Rich Kim is an American television director.

== Career ==
Rich holds a BFA from the University of Illinois Chicago and an MFA from the American Film Institute, where he won the Franklin J. Schaffner Award for best thesis film. He directed over 50 television series. He is also an executive producer on the Esquire Network television series Knife Fight for four seasons.

== Selected filmography ==
- 2026 – Wonka's The Golden Ticket
- 2023 – Is It Cake? (8 episodes)
- 2023 – Snake Oil (10 episodes)
- 2023 – MasterChef Junior : "Home for the Holidays" (4 episodes)
- 2020-2023 – Lego Masters (46 episodes)
- 2019-2023 – MasterChef (67 episodes)
- 2021-2022 – Family Game Fight! (9 episodes)
- 2022 – MasterChef Junior (16 episodes)
- 2021 – Foodtastic
- 2021 – Recipe For Change
- 2019 – Awake: The Million Dollar Game (8 episodes)
- 2018 – Making It (6 episodes)
- 2018 – Red Table Talk (18 episodes)
- 2014-2017 – Project Runway (59 episodes)
- 2015-2016 – Project Runway: Junior (11 episodes)
- 2016 – Kocktails with Khloé
- 2009-2013 – Tough Love (49 episodes)
- 2009 – Confessions of a Teen Idol (8 episodes)
- 2008 – The Pickup Artist (8 episodes)
- 2008 – Pussycat Dolls Present: Girlicious (8 episodes)
- 2008 – Scott Baio Is 45...and Single (8 episodes)
- 2003-2007 – Road Rules (50 episodes)
- 2003 – The Simple Life
- 2002-2004 – The Real World (30 episodes)

As executive producer

- 2013-2015 – Knife Fight (49 episodes)
- 2015 – Food To Get You Laid (7 episodes)

=== List of awards and nominations ===
Year	Result	Award	Category	Work	Ref.
2024	Nominated	Directors Guild of America	Outstanding Directing – Reality Programs	Lego Masters for "Is It Brick?"	
2023	Nominated	Directors Guild of America	Outstanding Directing – Reality Programs	Lego Masters for "Jurass-brick World"	
2023	Won	Daytime Emmy Awards	Outstanding Daytime Special	Recipe for Change: Standing up to Anti-Semitism	
2022	Nominated	Daytime Emmy Awards	Outstanding Daytime Special	Recipe for Change: Stop Asian Hate	
2021	Nominated	Directors Guild of America	Outstanding Directing – Reality Programs	Lego Masters for "Mega City Block"	
2020	Nominated	Primetime Emmy Awards	Outstanding Directing for a Reality Program	Lego Masters for "Mega City Block"	
2019	Nominated	Daytime Emmy Awards	Outstanding Talk Show Informative	Red Table Talk	
2003	Won	GMA Dove Award	Short Form Music Video of the Year	"Irene"; tobyMac	
