= Bug Juice =

Disney Channel reality series

- Created by: Douglas Ross; J. Rupert Thompson
- Country of origin: United States
- Original language: English
- No. of seasons: 3
- No. of episodes: 60

Production
- Executive producers: Douglas Ross; Greg Stewart; J. Rupert Thompson
- Producer: Laura Z. Thompson
- Running time: 22 minutes
- Production company: Evolution Media

Original release
- Network: Disney Channel
- Release: February 28, 1998 – October 15, 2001

Related
- Bug Juice: My Adventures at Camp (2018)

Bug Juice is a Disney Channel reality television series that premiered on February 28, 1998. The series focuses around 20 kids and their experiences at summer camp. Together, the kids work hard to excel in their activities and become friends. The phrase bug juice is a camping slang term for a very sweet juice drink made from powdered mixes, such as Kool-Aid, which are often served at summer camps.

On August 4, 2017, Disney Channel announced a revival series based on the original, titled Bug Juice: My Adventures at Camp, which premiered on July 16, 2018.

== Overview ==
=== Season 1 ===
The first season takes place in Waterford, Maine, at Camp Waziyatah, which has been in operation since 1922. The camp is broken down into two sessions. Each session is four weeks. Season 1 premiered on February 28, 1998.

- Camp Counselors: Peanut, Rhett Bachner (Grove 4), Morgan Will (Grove 4), Luna Hammond (Hill 4), Annie Doig (Hill 4), Gregory Weiss is the Candyman.
- Grove 4 (Session 1): Andrew Johnson, Darnell Jordan, Asa Korsen, Connor Shaw, Everett Boyle, Andy White, Hassan A. Omar, Jon Adler, Jason Wool, Malik Sollas
- Grove 4 (Session 2): Andrew Johnson, Darnell

Jordan, Asa Korsen, Hassan A Omar, Jon Adler, Malik Sollas, Max Brallier, Andy Freed, Justin Simon, Patrick Milhaupt

- Hill 4 (Session 1): Alison Harding, Caitlin Welby, Lauren Plumley, Martha, Mary Elizabeth Bradley, Megan Tarr, Sarai Abdullah Fife, LaKisha Barksdale, Jenny, Stephanie Etkin
- Hill 4 (Session 2): Caitlin Welby, Sarai Abdullah Fife, LaKisha Barksdale, Stephanie Etkin, Annie Friedman, Cammie Delany, Sarah Ceglarski, Molly McGuinness, Anna Korsen

=== Season 2 ===
Season 2 takes place in Horse Shoe, North Carolina, at Camp Highlander. The camp is broken down into three sessions. It premiered on March 5, 2000.

Male counselors for Cabin 28 are Andrew Cohen and Andrew Foti. Female counselors for Cabin 6 are Amanda Peryln, Nikki K, Tiffany Lydon, and Ali Baske.

Female campers in Session A include Libby, Maryanne, Sarah, Jenny, Alex, Simana, Annette, Nikki, Samantha, and Michaela. In Session B, Annette and Samantha are joined by Hilary, Michelle, Kelly, Kim, Jennifer, Michelle, Baylor, and Jessica. In Session C, Kim, Jennifer, Baylor, and Jessica are joined by Jess, Gaby, Dalit, Danielle, Alanna, and Jasmyne.

Male campers in Session A include Steven, Kevin, Sam, Alvan, Jared, Austin, Ricky, Brendan, Alex, Chasen. In Session B, Steven, Alvan, Ricky, and Chasen are joined by Josh, Stefan, Hunter, Farb, Tyler, and Conor. In Session C, Steven, Ricky, Josh, Hunter, and Farb are joined by Michael, Marcellus, Brandon, Brendan, and Kevin.

=== Season 3 ===
Season three takes place in Tererro, New Mexico, at Brush Ranch Camp. The camp is broken down into two four-week sessions. The season began airing on June 3, 2001.

Male campers in Rustlers include JJ (aka Shade), Lee, Alex Hurlbutt, Brendon, Josh, Bryan, Todd, Houston, Alex J., and Jordan in Session 1. Session 2 includes Jake, Aaron, Brendon, Sam, Bryan, Terrance, Will, Mike, Josh, and Carl.

Female campers in Indian Creek include Eve La Fountain, Jen, Hallie, Reid, Kelly, Amanda Bustamante, Ali C., Kristen, Megan, and Ali B. in Session 1. Session 2 includes Alana, Carrie, Hallie, Alex, Kelly, Amanda Bustamante, Leela, Sarah, Megan, Ellie, and Kiersten.

== Development and production ==
The series' co-creator Douglas Ross thought that summer camp would be the "perfect setting for a reality-based program geared for 9 to 12-year-olds." Ross, a former camper himself, pitched the idea to the Disney Channel and the then head of programming and production Rich Ross. He was given the green light to create the series without a pilot episode. The location, Camp Waziyatah, was decided a few months before the 1997 camp season started. The producers conducted about 100 phone interviews and 60 home visits before selecting 27 campers. Four camp counselors were chosen from both the camp's existing group and 350 members of the public in response to an open call on the Internet. The first season was filmed for 56 days straight by three film crews. The boys' and girls' cabins had all male and all female crews, led by directors Donald Bull and Laura Zucco respectively. Over 1,000 hours was shot by two directors, two cameras, and two sound operators.

On July 15, 1999, Disney ordered a second season; it premiered on March 5, 2000. In June 2000, production began on a third season which was announced on July 12; it began airing on June 3, 2001.

== Episodes ==
=== Series overview ===
| Season | Episodes | Originally released | |
| Season | Episodes | First released | Last released |
|---|---|---|---|
| 1 | 20 | February 28, 1998 | July 5, 1998 |
| 2 | 20 | March 5, 2000 | July 16, 2000 |
| 3 | 20 | June 3, 2001 | October 15, 2001 |

=== Season 1 (1998) ===
| No. overall | No. in season | Title | Original release date |
|---|---|---|---|
| 1 | 1 | "Camp Waziyatah" | February 28, 1998 |
| 2 | 2 | "Getting to Know You" | February 28, 1998 |
| 3 | 3 | "To Clique... Or Not to Clique" | March 8, 1998 |
| 4 | 4 | "Adventure Bound: Bushwacked" | March 15, 1998 |
| 5 | 5 | "Molecules Colliding" | March 22, 1998 |
| 6 | 6 | "Boys-to-Men Talent Show" | March 29, 1998 |
| 7 | 7 | "Face the Fire: Unity Campfire" | May 3, 1998 |
| 8 | 8 | "Aftershocks" | May 3, 1998 |
| 9 | 9 | "No Pain, No Gain" | May 3, 1998 |
| 10 | 10 | "Nice Guys Finish First" | May 3, 1998 |
| 11 | 11 | "Goodbye, Session One" | May 10, 1998 |
| 12 | 12 | "Ch, Ch, Changes" | May 31, 1998 |
| 13 | 13 | "Turn, Turn, Turn" | June 7, 1998 |
| 14 | 14 | "When the Boys Go Away, Girls Will Play" | June 14, 1998 |
| 15 | 15 | "We Shall Overcome" | June 21, 1998 |
| 16 | 16 | "Tough Love" | June 28, 1998 |
| 17 | 17 | "Flirting with Disaster: Co-Ed Canoe Trip" | June 28, 1998 |
| 18 | 18 | "So Long, Farewell" | June 28, 1998 |
| 19 | 19 | "Goodbye Wazi" | July 5, 1998 |
| 20 | 20 | "Waziyatah Scrapbook" | July 5, 1998 |

=== Season 2 (2000) ===
| No. overall | No. in season | Title | Original release date |
|---|---|---|---|
| 21 | 1 | "Your Adventure Starts Here" | March 5, 2000 |
| 22 | 2 | "You Never Know Until You Try" | March 5, 2000 |
| 23 | 3 | "Odd Man Out" | March 12, 2000 |
| 24 | 4 | "You Get What You Give" | March 19, 2000 |
| 25 | 5 | "Brits, Frights and Videotape" | March 26, 2000 |
| 26 | 6 | "Old Friends and New Friends" | April 2, 2000 |
| 27 | 7 | "I'm Gonna Walk Those Fears Right Outta My Head" | April 9, 2000 |
| 28 | 8 | "First Farewells" | April 23, 2000 |
| 29 | 9 | "Bring On the New Recruits" | April 30, 2000 |
| 30 | 10 | "The Dance of Love" | May 7, 2000 |
| 31 | 11 | "Climbing Toward Acceptance" | May 14, 2000 |
| 32 | 12 | "Outside Looking In" | May 21, 2000 |
| 33 | 13 | "You Don't Have to Be a Star to Shine" | May 28, 2000 |
| 34 | 14 | "July Goodbye" | June 4, 2000 |
| 35 | 15 | "New Kids on the Bus" | June 11, 2000 |
| 36 | 16 | "Discovering Your Inner Camper" | June 18, 2000 |
| 37 | 17 | "Countdown Begins" | June 25, 2000 |
| 38 | 18 | "War Breaks at Highlander" | July 2, 2000 |
| 39 | 19 | "And the Winner Is..." | July 9, 2000 |
| 40 | 20 | "Goodbye, Highlander" | July 16, 2000 |

=== Season 3 (2001) ===
| No. overall | No. in season | Title | Original release date |
|---|---|---|---|
| 41 | 1 | "Welcome to Brush Ranch Camp" | June 3, 2001 |
| 42 | 2 | "It's Bedtime" | June 3, 2001 |
| 43 | 3 | "Sorry" | June 10, 2001 |
| 44 | 4 | "JJ's Revenge" | June 17, 2001 |
| 45 | 5 | "Let's Eat" | June 24, 2001 |
| 46 | 6 | "Choices and Consequences" | July 1, 2001 |
| 47 | 7 | "Bad Thing" | July 8, 2001 |
| 48 | 8 | "It's Hot" | July 15, 2001 |
| 49 | 9 | "Let's Read" | July 22, 2001 |
| 50 | 10 | "No More Bug Juice" | July 29, 2001 |
| 51 | 11 | "DJ Shade Saves the Dance" | August 5, 2001 |
| 52 | 12 | "It's Rock N' Roll Time" | August 12, 2001 |
| 53 | 13 | "Saves the Princess" | August 19, 2001 |
| 54 | 14 | "I Give Up" | August 26, 2001 |
| 55 | 15 | "Airplanes" | September 2, 2001 |
| 56 | 16 | "Singing" | September 9, 2001 |
| 57 | 17 | "Valentine's Day" | September 16, 2001 |
| 58 | 18 | "Monkey See Monkey Do" | September 23, 2001 |
| 59 | 19 | "Gettin' Dirty" | September 30, 2001 |
| 60 | 20 | "End of Brush Ranch" | October 15, 2001 |

== Broadcast ==
The show premiered on Disney Channel in 1998, and ran for three seasons ending in 2001. Bug Juice was subsequently pulled from the schedule and was not aired again until the summer of 2004, during which episodes from the first season ran nightly in chronological order. The last episode of Bug Juice aired August 20, 2004, and it has not been shown since.

During the summer of 2006, Disney began posting mini episodes on its website, encouraging viewers of the Disney Channel to log on and view 5-minute short clips from episodes of the first season.

Bug Juice was also broadcast in the UK on Channel 4's The Bigger Breakfast.

== Revival ==
On August 4, 2017, Disney Channel announced that it would revive the series. The first season of the revival took take place at Camp Waziyatah, the same location of the first season of the original series. The new series, given the title Bug Juice: My Adventures at Camp, premiered on July 16, 2018.
