= Chrystal Bougon =

American businesswoman and author

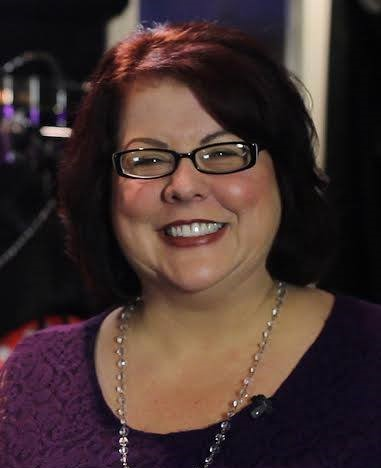
- Chrystal Bougon at her boutique
- Known for: Curvy Girl Lingerie (CEO); BlissConnection (CEO)
- Notable work: The Curvy Girl Playbook

Chrystal Bougon is the owner of Curvy Girl Lingerie, a plus-size lingerie store, and the CEO of BlissConnection. She is the author of The Curvy Girl Playbook, and executive co-producer of the reality television show Plus Life. She is also the host of the radio show Everyone Wants to Have Better Sex.

== Career ==
Chrystal Bougon runs what she claims is the only plus-size lingerie boutique in the US, called Curvy Girl Lingerie. The store was vandalized three times in 2015.

Bougon also started BlissConnection, which is a woman-owned romance store that sells toys, lubricants, oils, and costumes. BlissConnection also offers information related to sex products for enhancing intimate relationships.

She has written an essay in the Jes Baker's book Things No One Will Tell Fat Girls titled "Hot Sex & The Curvy Girl".

She is the host of the radio show titled Bliss Talks.

She is the author of several books including The Curvy Girl Playbook.

She and Adryenn Ashley are the executive producers of the reality TV show Plus Life. The show centers on Bougon's Curvy Girl Lingerie boutique.

She regularly writes articles and columns for Huffington Post and YourTango.

Before starting her own ventures, Bougon used to work for technology companies in Silicon Valley.

== Regular women un-Photoshopped campaign ==
Bougon started the campaign by asking women of all shapes and sizes to post pictures of themselves in lingerie on her Curvy Girl Facebook Page. Bougon says she wanted to connect with the "regular" people out there in the Internet world and show them that: "For most Curvies, they have rolls, bumps, lumps, scars, stretch marks, surgery scars, breasts that are natural and that have breast-fed babies. And they can still be stunning and beautiful." After fitness advocate Maria Kang criticized the campaign in a post on Kang's Facebook page, Bougon and other people reported Kang's comments as "hate speech" to Facebook's administration, which blocked Kang's accounts for two days. Kang and Bougon subsequently debated their opposing views over social and broadcast media. Bougon made numerous appearances in shows like CNN, the Today Show, Good Morning America, and The Bethany Show to defend her campaign.

== COVID-19 and obesity ==
Bougon was first inoculated against COVID-19 at age 53, only days after vaccine eligibility in California was broadened to people with underlying conditions, which included a body-mass index of 40 or more (233 pounds for an adult who is 5 feet 4 inches tall). "The virus has underscored yet another serious inequity" but "finally, being fat actually paid off".

Studies link higher body mass index, or BMI, to increased risk for severe COVID-19 symptoms. In 2013, the American Medical Association recognized obesity as a disease. The fat-acceptance movement nevertheless argues it is possible to be healthy at any size.

== FatProductReview YouTube channel ==
Bougon runs a YouTube channel by the name FatProductReview, self-described as "fat products reviewed by fat people for fat people".

== Awards ==
As a radio show host, Bougon received the "Frontier Fifty" award from Talkers Magazine in 2009 along with Laura Schlessinger, Rush Limbaugh, and Sean Hannity in the same year.
