= Nicholas Irving =

American author and soldier (born 1986)

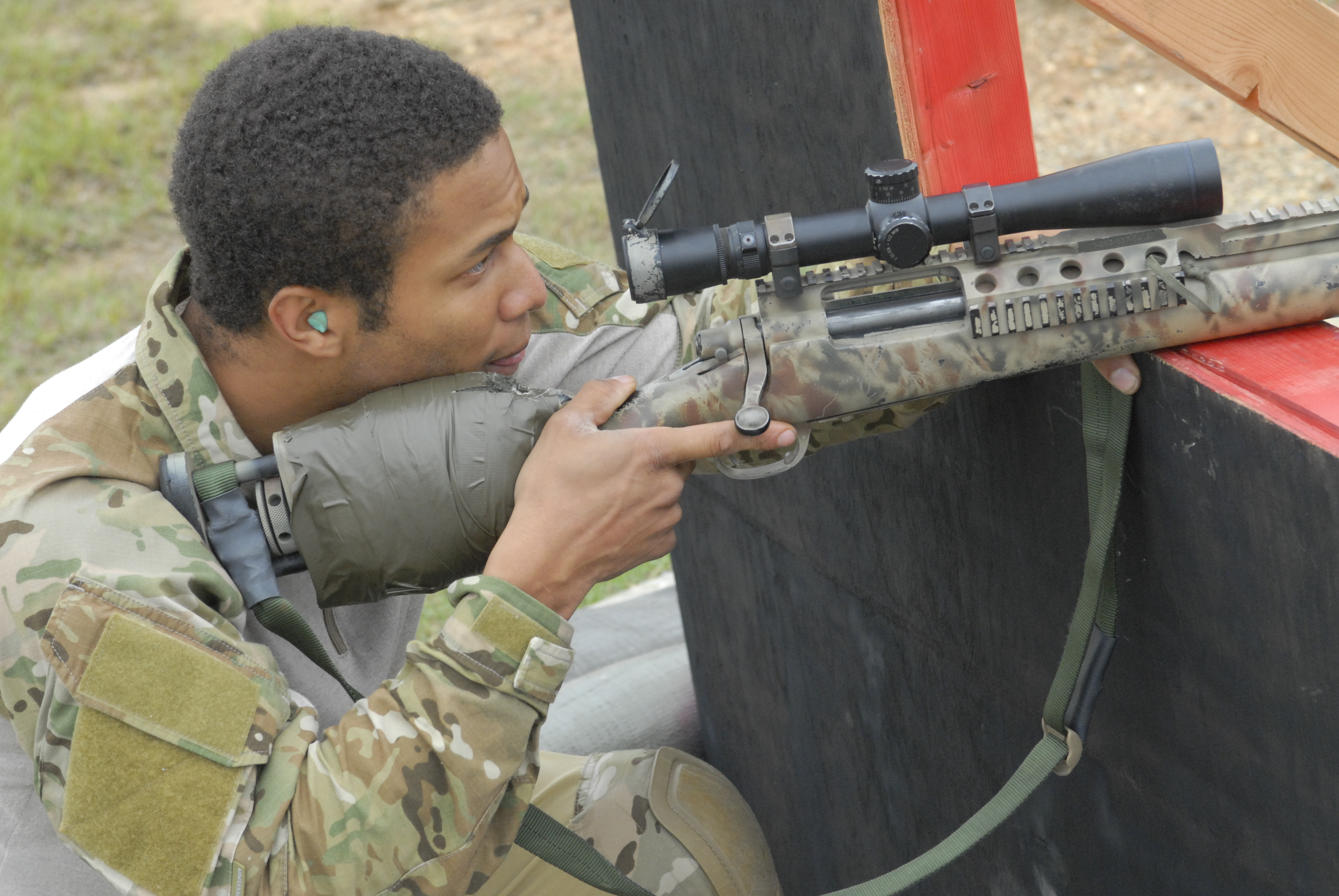
- Irving during the "Defensive shoot" event during the ninth annual U.S. Army International Sniper Competition
- Born: November 28, 1986 (age 39); Augsburg, West Germany (present-day Germany)
- Military career
- Allegiance: United States
- Branch: United States Army
- Service years: 2004–2010
- Rank: Sergeant
- Unit: 75th Ranger Regiment: 3rd Ranger Battalion
- Conflicts: Iraq War; War in Afghanistan

Nicholas Irving (born November 28, 1986) is an American author and former soldier. He was a special operations sniper in the 3rd Ranger Battalion for the U.S. Army.

== Early life ==
Nicholas Irving was born on November 28, 1986, in Augsburg, Germany and raised in Maryland. His parents were both enlisted soldiers.

Irving was a poor student except for when a subject was adjacent to his military interests, namely junior high ROTC and math upon learning of its application in sniping. He graduated high school with a 1.7 g.p.a.

Irving taught himself to play piano and violin in his youth.

== Career ==
=== Military ===
Irving originally intended to join the Navy SEALs, but he failed a colorblindness test. He instead joined the United States Army Rangers, becoming its first African-American sniper. Irving served for three tours in Iraq and one tour in Afghanistan. He was issued a SR-25 rifle, which he nicknamed Dirty Diana, referencing the Michael Jackson song of the same name. Irving was known to be very protective of his rifle, constantly maintaining it and keeping it painted with its pattern.

Irving has claimed to have completed 33 kills over approximately 100 days, though United States Special Operations Command has stated they do not track this figure and cannot verify it.

Irving left the army to become a military contractor in March 2010. Irving experienced issues stemming from alcoholism, suicidal thoughts, and PTSD as a result of his service, particularly in the first two years after leaving the Army. Irving has described significant problems with alcohol abuse until a decline in his consumption in 2014.

=== Entertainment ===
In 2016, Irving was one of four military leaders to serve as coaches on the reality show American Grit with John Cena.

He also served as an on-set advisor for Doug Liman's 2017 sniper film The Wall.

=== Author ===
In 2015, he wrote and published with Gary Brozek The Reaper: Autobiography of One of the Deadliest Special Ops Snipers, a New York Times bestseller about his military career during the war on terror. On February 2, 2015, The Weinstein Company acquired the television rights to make a miniseries out of the autobiography. On March 5, 2015, NBC picked up the miniseries from Weinstein. In late 2017, Irving revealed in a podcast that the miniseries has been scrapped, but a movie based on the book was in preproduction.

=== Social media ===
In 2023, he featured in Youtube channel Jubilee's video: Do All Killers Think The Same? | Spectrum. Irving also as of 2026, features in interview podcasts by channel, djvlad. Irving's Instagram handle is officialreaper33.

== Personal life ==
Irving married Jessica Irving in 2007, whom he had met in the 1st grade and reconnected with over the internet in 2005.

Irving lives in Texas, citing its more permissive gun laws than that of Maryland. He currently owns a firing range and training center for professional shooters in San Antonio.

== Bibliography ==
Nonfiction

- Basic & Intermediate Combat Survival (2011) ISBN 1461032954
- Team Reaper: 3rd Ranger Battalion's Deadliest Sniper Team (2012) ISBN 9781470022839
- Precision Rifle B.I.B.L.E: (Ballistics In Battlefield Learned Environments) (2012)ISBN 9781479256297
- The Reaper: Autobiography of One of the Deadliest Special Ops Snipers (2015, with Gary Brozek) ISBN 9781250080608
- Way of the Reaper: My Greatest Untold Missions and the Art of Being a Sniper (2016, with Gary Brozek) ISBN 9781250088352
- Never Fear Anything: My Untold Story As A Sniper In Our Nations Longest War (2018, with Robert Terkla) ISBN 9780999769706

Fiction

- Reaper: Ghost Target (2018, with A.J. Tata) ISBN 9781250127341
- Reaper: Threat Zero (2019, with A.J. Tata) ISBN 9781250127365
- Reaper: Drone Strike (2020, with A.J. Tata) ISBN 9781250240743
- Walker Drive (2021) ISBN 9781736787229

== See also ==
- American Sniper
- List of snipers
- Longest recorded sniper kills
