= Jes Baker =

American writer, photographer, and activist

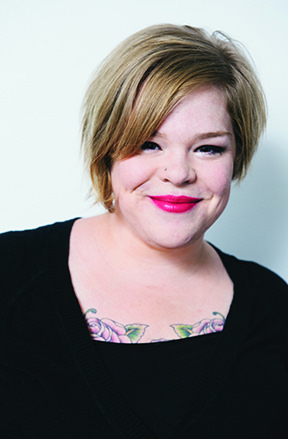
- Other names: Jes M. Baker; The Militant Baker
- Occupations: Blogger; Author; Photographer; Activist
- Years active: 2013−-present
- Known for: Body positive movement

Jes M. Baker is an American writer, photographer, and activist, best known for being part of the body positive movement. She blogs as The Militant Baker. Her writing focuses on self-image, and topics range from body hair to rape culture. Baker founded the Body Love Conference, which held regional conferences in Arizona in 2014 and 2015.

== Early life ==
Baker was born in 1986, the eldest daughter of a large Mormon family. She went to college in Arizona and Idaho. After college, she worked as a pastry chef, a psych-social rehabilitation specialist, and a mental health educator at a company that provides job support to those with mental difficulties.

== Career ==
In March 2012 Baker began blogging, using the moniker The Militant Baker. She was inspired by a body positive writer named Rachele who ran a blog called The Nearsighted Owl. Baker's blog features posts on equality, recipes, body positive language, DIY, notes on self-acceptance, the feminist movement, and empowerment. In her blog, she explores the connection between self-esteem, body image and mental health.

In 2013, Baker helped create a series of images, using the phrase "Attractive and Fat". The images were a response to the advertisements of the clothing store Abercrombie and Fitch. Baker, who wears a size 22, changed the store's logo from A&F to "Attractive and Fat" in a mock ad, intended to challenge the marketing strategies of the store. Back in 2006, store CEO Mike Jeffries had publicly made a statement that only "cool kids" belonged in Abercrombie clothes, that the store was exclusively for those who were considered to be popular. In May 2013, Baker wrote "I challenge the separation of attractive and fat, and I assert that they are compatible regardless of what you believe;" Following this, Jeffries issued an apology.

Baker's photo for The Adipositivity Project in 2013 was described by Bustle magazine as one of 'The Most Body Positive Photos From the Last 30 Years'. In 2014, she co-founded the Expose Project, which features views of bodies that don't conform to cultural stereotypes and standards of beauty.

In 2014 she gave a TEDx talk, explaining how body insecurity hinders personal and professional productivity: "the way we view our bodies determines the way we participate in the world." In 2015, she coined the term "body currency" referring to how people devote their financial and mental energies to make their exterior bodies perfect, at the cost of mental happiness.

In October 2015, her book Things No One Will Tell Fat Girls was published. The book includes short guest essays by Virgie Tovar, Sonya Renee Taylor, Andrew Walen, Jen McLellan, Shanna Katz Kattari, Kimberly A. Peace, Sam Dylan Finch, Bruce Sturgell, and Chrystal Bougon, who present perspectives and experiences on topics like self-acceptance and unlearning patriarchal beauty standards. In addition, Baker shares personal experiences paired with research. To promote the book, Baker developed the hashtag #FatGirlsCan as a way for women to share videos and images of what activities they can participate in regardless of their body size. According to WorldCat, the book is held in 230 libraries.

Baker was the October/November 2015 cover model for DailyVenusDiva.com. She also has written for publications like xoJane, Ravishly and Volup2.

== Personal life ==
Baker has discussed her struggles with depression as well as borderline personality disorder. She has over 20 tattoos, which she has said was a way for her to acknowledge the visibility of areas of her body, like her arms, which she struggled with.

She lives in Tucson, Arizona.

== Works and publications ==
- Baker, Jes (May 19, 2013). "To: Mike Jeffries, c/o Abercrombie and Fitch". The Militant Baker.
- Baker, Jes (May 2014). Change Your World, not Your Body: The Social Impact of Body Love. TEDxTucsonSalon.
- Baker, Jes (2015). Things No One Will Tell Fat Girls: A Handbook of Unapologetic Living. Berkeley, California: Seal Press. ISBN 978-1-580-05582-6. OCLC 903424539.
