= Ronnie Woo =

American chef and model

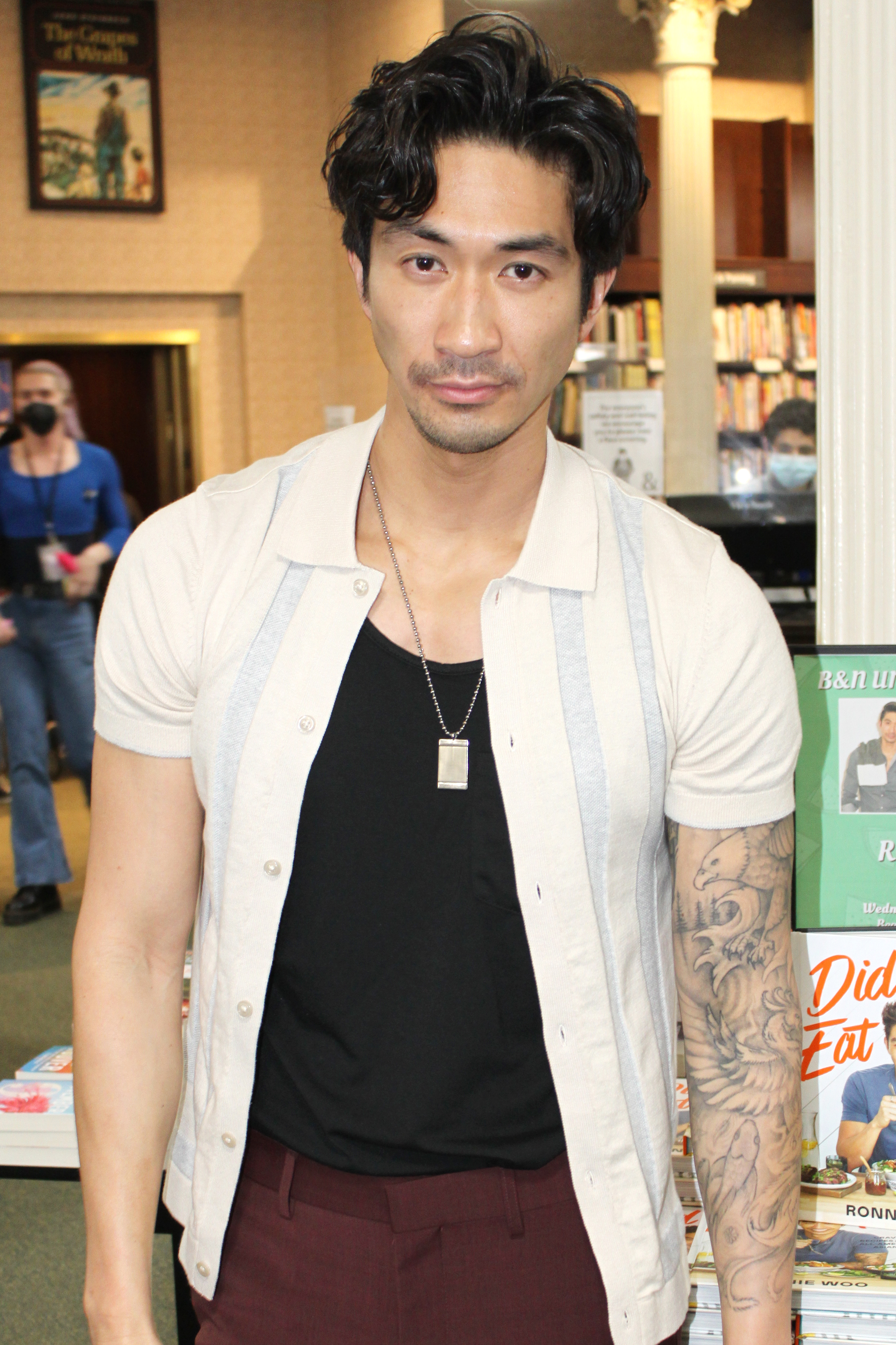
- Ronnie Woo at his Union Square Barnes & Noble Book signing event
- Born: March 1, 1985 (age 41); Seattle, Washington, U.S.
- Occupations: Chef, television personality, author
- Known for: Food To Get You Laid, Rachael Ray, Is It Cake?, Did You Eat Yet?(cookbook)

Ronnie Woo (born March 1, 1985) is an American chef, television personality, author, and former model. He is the author of the bestselling cookbook, Did You Eat Yet?, and hosted a cooking reality show, Food To Get You Laid, where he coached people in their homes to prepare meals using ingredients they already had, and is a regular guest on The Rachael Ray Show and The Today Show.

== Early life ==
Woo grew up in Seattle, Washington with his parents and two sisters. At the age of 19, he moved to Los Angeles, California, to pursue his modeling career. He currently resides in Los Angeles, California.

== Modeling ==
Woo was signed to Wilhelmina Models when he was 19 years old shortly after moving to Los Angeles, but eventually switched to Ford Models a few years later. He did both print and runway modeling. Some of his past modeling work includes Nordstrom, Macy's, K-Swiss, Ray-Ban, and Banana Republic.

== Education ==
Woo attended the University of Washington from 2003 to 2004, but moved to Los Angeles after his first year. After taking a year off from school, he transferred to the University of California, Los Angeles in 2006 and graduated in 2009 with an undergraduate degree in psychology and later received two master's degrees: a Masters in Marriage and Family Therapy and a Masters in Business Administration. Although Woo did not continue on to be a therapist, he does support the profession and "believes that everyone should have one.".

== Chef and TV career ==
=== The Delicious Cook ===
In 2011, Woo completed a culinary program with the Northwest Culinary Academy of Vancouver while also creating his food blog, The Delicious Cook. A few months later, his food blog evolved into what is now his private chef company, based in Beverly Hills, which specializes in intimate four-star dinner parties. Woo has worked with Mindy Kaling, Gwyneth Paltrow, Jessica Alba, Charlie Sheen, Kathy Griffin, Holly Robinson Peete, Dita Von Teese, Nancy O'Dell, and Gilles Marini. On May 5, 2013, Woo premiered a pop-up event called Salt & Honey, which served California comfort-style dishes.

=== Food To Get You Laid ===
Woo is the host and chef of the cooking and reality television show Food To Get You Laid on Logo TV, which premiered in 2015. In the show, Woo coaches real people in their homes on how to cook a meal in their kitchen in hopes to spice up their love life via recipes that everyday people can make at home.

Woo said this about the show: “Food does more than just bring people together, it creates memories. I think all of us have the tools to create a memorable meal, so we’re going into people’s homes and showing them how they can use what’s already in their kitchen to make a romantic and delicious meal they'll never forget."

=== Television and guest appearances ===
Woo was a guest chef expert on Season 4 of Home Made Simple on the Oprah Winfrey Network (OWN) and was added to the cast as a regular chef expert in season 5. He has made guest appearances on Tyra Banks's FABLife (where Chrissy Teigen asked him to cook shirtless), Fuse's Big Freedia: Queen of Bounce, and is a regular contributor to Good Day LA. Woo has also made a celebrity chef appearance on NBC's Food Fighters. In 2016, Woo joined the cast of Logo TV's Secret Guide To Summer for a one-hour summer special. Woo is a regular chef guest on The Rachael Ray Show and Hallmark Channel's The Home and Family Show.

Woo was a featured guest on Food Network's The Kitchen, Hollywood Today Live, and featured guest judge on the Thanksgiving episode of Food Network's Beat Bobby Flay in 2017. In the second half of the year, he was hired as the LA correspondent for the Scripps Network Interactive Digital platform, Genius Kitchen. In 2018, he made a second guest appearance on Food Network's The Kitchen, along with multiple judging appearances on episodes of Food Network's Beat Bobby Flay. Ronnie has made several appearances on CMT's talk show, Pickler & Ben and even co-hosted a special cooking/dating episode called "Cooking For Love With Chef Ronnie Woo" for Pickler & Ben in 2019. In the fall of 2019, Woo was a guest on The Kelly Clarkson Show.

Woo makes regular guest appearances on The Today Show, The Rachael Ray Show, and The Home and Family Show.

In the beginning of 2022, Woo made a special appearance on the Kevin Hart Winter Olympics Tailgate Party special that aired exclusively on Peacock (streaming service). Woo is also a celebrity judge on the Netflix show Is It Cake?. In 2025, Woo was a guest judge on America's Test Kitchen: The Next Generation.

=== YouTube channel and Food Network Kitchen ===
At the end of 2019, Woo announced the launch of his YouTube channel, which would premiere its first mini-series, Craving Jetlag, in January 2020. In 2020, Woo signed as on-camera talent with the Food Network Kitchen app, where he delivers live cooking classes and on-demand cooking videos.

== Cookbooks ==
=== Did You Eat Yet? Craveable Recipes from an All-American Asian Chef ===
In August 2020, Woo inked a significant publishing deal with Houghton Mifflin Harcourt for his first cookbook titled Did You Eat Yet? set for release in the spring of 2023. His cookbook was listed as one of Apple's most anticipated cookbooks of 2023.

Woo officially released his debut cookbook, Did You Eat Yet? , via HarperCollins on March 14, 2023, and appeared on Good Morning America, The Drew Barrymore Show, and The Today Show to promote the book. He also appeared on The Rachael Ray Show the following week to discuss the book with Rachael Ray. Later in the year, he made appearances on Access Hollywood and Watch What Happens Live with Andy Cohen to further promote and talk about the cookbook. Did You Eat Yet? has garnered numerous positive reviews and became a bestseller during publication week. Woo was featured in multiple profiles and articles where he talks about his new cookbook and background, including Men's Health, People Magazine, Tasting Table, Out (magazine), and Wondermind.

=== Better for You, Better for Your Dog: Healthy Everyday Recipes for You & Your Canine ===
Woo's second cookbook titled Better for You, Better for Your Dog: Healthy Everyday Recipes for You & Your Canine is set for release in the Fall of 2026. This cookbook is described as "A first-of-its-kind cookbook with chef-created meals for you and your dog—featuring 60+ recipes with vet-approved canine versions so you can cook once and share every meal together."

== Personal life ==
Woo is openly gay and has been married to his husband since 2008. In 2023, Woo was named to Out Magazine's OUT100 list, honoring "his unconventional career path" and contributions to the community.
