= Steve Austin's Broken Skull Challenge =

American reality television competition show

- Genre: Competition; Reality television
- Created by: Cris Abrego; Steve Austin; Jack Heller
- Directed by: Adam Vetri
- Presented by: Steve Austin
- Country of origin: United States
- Original language: English
- No. of seasons: 5
- No. of episodes: 67

Production
- Executive producers: Christian Sarabia; Rabih Gholam; Steve Austin; Jack Heller; Vince Cariati; Steve Kaufman
- Production locations: Agua Dulce, California, United States
- Running time: 41–43 minutes
- Production companies: Broken Skull Productions; 51 Minds Entertainment; Endemol

Original release
- Network: CMT
- Release: July 6, 2014 – December 19, 2017

Related
- Redneck Island

Steve Austin’s Broken Skull Challenge is an American reality television competition show that premiered on July 6, 2014, on CMT. It is created and hosted by former professional wrestler Steve Austin. The fifth and final season was announced by CMT on August 9, 2017, and premiered on September 26. The final episode of the series aired on December 19, 2017.

== Series overview ==
Each episode of Steve Austin's Broken Skull Challenge brings a group of eight contestants, either all men or all women, to the "Broken Skull Ranch" to compete in a series of physical challenges. In an interview with KMTV-TV, Austin revealed that the actual location was not the real Broken Skull Ranch, which is owned and operated by Austin near Tilden, Texas, but an area just outside of Los Angeles designed to represent his ranch. The Santa Clarita Valley's website confirmed the location to be a private property represented by Agua Dulce Movie Ranch in Agua Dulce, California. The contestants are selected from athletic backgrounds, including CrossFit, Spartan Racers, Tough Mudder, mixed martial arts (MMA), and pro wrestling. The contestants are eliminated in a series of competitions with the last one standing facing a tough obstacle course known as the Skullbuster.

The first contestant in the series to successfully complete all elements of the Skullbuster wins $10,000, is declared champion, and sets the time to beat for subsequent contestants. Men and women have separate champions. If a contestant completes the course in a shorter time, he/she becomes the new champion and receives $10,000, and that time becomes the new benchmark. However, every time a contestant either fails to beat the champion's time or does not complete the course at all, the current champion wins an additional $10,000. During the first season, no prize money was awarded until the first successful completion of the Skullbuster. The course has been modified at the start of each new season, and the previous season's champion is given the first opportunity to run it and set the time to beat.

== Elimination challenges ==
In each episode, the eight contestants face off in head-to-head competitions in a single-elimination bracket format. The first round bracket match-ups are chosen at random. The challenges vary in their format, but are generally very physically demanding and often involve physical contact between the two contestants. In addition, all competitions take place outdoors in hot, desert-like conditions, so the contestants are also battling the elements of the weather. Austin first explains the challenge to the contestants and to the viewers, then provides verbal encouragement to the contestants and somewhat of a play-by-play analysis of the competition while it is ongoing.

== The Pit ==
The final two contestants face off in a two-part challenge. The first part is not an elimination challenge; it is designed to wear down the contestants. Once the first part is completed, both contestants proceed immediately into the Pit to determine a winner. The Pit is always featured as the final individual challenge to determine the episode's overall winner, with no rest period except for the player who completed the previous challenge first. Beginning in the second season, a rule was instituted that the second contestant must enter the Pit within one minute of the first contestant or he/she is disqualified. The Pit is a circular dirt ring resembling an amateur wrestling circle or a sumo wrestling ring, measuring 15 feet wide. Once both players have entered the Pit, a signal is given, and the two contestants wrestle each other. The first person able to force their opponent out of the ring is declared the winner. Takedowns may occur but they do not apply toward the final outcome. The style of the Pit is very similar to the Conquer portion of the Breakthrough & Conquer event of American Gladiators.

== Skullbuster ==
After a day's rest, the winner of the elimination challenges moves on to face the Skullbuster, a 1/2-mile-long obstacle course with ten obstacles. Some of the obstacles are identified as "restart elements"; if the contestant fails to complete one of these satisfactorily, he/she must return to its beginning for another attempt. If at any time the contestant decides not to continue, the current champion wins by default. The Skullbuster has been modified at the beginning of each season after the first, and the previous season's champion is given the first opportunity to run it and set the time for future contestants to beat.

== Awards and honors ==
Year	Category	Nominee(s)	Episode	Result
2014	Directors Guild of America Award for Outstanding Directing – Reality Programs	Adam Vetri	"Welcome to the Gun Show"	Nominated
2015	Directors Guild of America Award for Outstanding Directing – Reality Programs	Adam Vetri	"Gods of War"	Won

== Production notes ==
Plans for the show's third season were briefly called into question when the show's crew walked off the job on July 22, 2015, halting production. The crew struck seeking union representation with the International Alliance of Theatrical Stage Employees. The strike was successfully resolved on August 2, 2015, and production resumed the next day.
