= Jon Kroll =

American producer, director, and writer

Jon Kroll is an American producer, director, and writer who has worked in film and both scripted and non-scripted television. His work in television has been seen on a variety of broadcast and cable networks over the past 30 years. He is best known for his work as executive producer and show runner on Gordon Ramsay: Uncharted for the National Geographic network. He has worked on other National Geographic projects, including "Never Say Never with Jeff Jenkins," "Appetite for Adventure with Moe Cason" and "Extraordinary Birder with Christian Cooper", which won an Emmy Award.

Kroll has directed three feature films and produced dozens of television programs, including The Amazing Race, for which he was honored with a 2004 Primetime Emmy Award. For four years, he was executive vice president, original programming, for New Line Television, where he served as executive producer for both scripted and unscripted programming. He is an adjunct professor for the School of Cinematic Arts at the University of Southern California (USC).

In 2022, Kroll relocated to Wellington, New Zealand where he continues to develop and produce television shows for the U.S., Asia and Australasia marketplaces. He also serves on the Board of the New Zealand Film Commission.

== Early life ==
Kroll was raised on a commune in Northern California where there was no electricity or television. He attended San Francisco State University where he earned his bachelor's in film production, and then the University of Southern California School of Cinema-Television's Peter Stark Motion Picture Producing Program, where he received an MFA.

== Career ==
=== Work in film ===
Kroll directed From Hell to Hollywood, a biographical documentary about the life of Associated Press photojournalist Nick Ut whose 1972 Pulitzer Prize-winning photo is credited with helping to bring an end to the Vietnam War. The film premiered at the Kansas City Film Fest International, where it won the Audience Award, and also screened at the Rising Sun International Film Festival in Japan, where it won the Documentary Award.

Earlier in his career, Kroll directed three narrative films, including Amanda and the Alien based on a short story by Robert Silverberg, which became Showtime's highest rated original film of 1995.

=== Television ===
Kroll produced Pink Collar Crimes, an 8-episode true crime series for CBS. Kroll also produced American Grit and Bullseye for Fox, The Week the Women Went for the BBC and Lifetime, Pit Bulls & Parolees for Animal Planet, Flipping Vegas for A&E, Big Brother on CBS, High School Confidential on WE-TV, and From Star Wars to Star Wars on Fox. He also co-executive produced The Amazing Race, for which he won a 2004 prime time Emmy Award. His most notable scripted show to date has been Blade: The Series.

==== Amish in the City ====
Kroll's most controversial project has been Amish in the City, a show for UPN that caused 51 members of congress to send a letter of protest to the network.
