= Awake: The Million Dollar Game =

2019 American game show

- Genre: Game show
- Directed by: Rich Kim
- Presented by: James Davis
- Country of origin: United States
- Original language: English
- No. of seasons: 1
- No. of episodes: 8

Production
- Executive producers: Victoria Ashbourne; David Broome; Stuart Shawcross; Yong Yam
- Production companies: 25/7 Productions; Hello Dolly!

Original release
- Network: Netflix
- Release: June 14, 2019

Awake: The Million Dollar Game is an American game show on Netflix. Contestants on the show must stay awake for over 24 hours before competing in various physical and mental challenges. The show is hosted by James Davis. The eight-episode first season was released on June 14, 2019.

== Format ==
Seven contestants are given a large number of quarters and must count them one-by-one for 24 hours, without sleeping. Once this time expires, they each guess how much money they have individually counted and appear onstage. The contestant who counted the fewest coins, and the one whose guess was the most in error, are immediately eliminated.

=== Main game ===
The five remaining contestants compete in a series of three physical and mental challenges. At the end of each challenge, the contestant who has reached the highest score or finished in the shortest time automatically advances to the next one. The remaining contestants stand at a line of podiums, each equipped with a button, and are offered a cash buyout to quit the game ($2,500 on the first challenge, $5,000 on the second, $7,500 on the third). The first contestant to push their button (if any) receives the buyout money and leaves the competition. If no one accepts the offer, the lowest scorer or slowest finisher is eliminated with no winnings. The buyout/elimination process is similar to that used in the British game show PokerFace.

After the third challenge and elimination, the two remaining contestants are given 10 seconds to accept a cash buyout of $10,000. If both of them reject this offer, the one who was less accurate in counting their quarters is eliminated.

=== End game ===
The remaining contestant must now guess the total amount of money they counted. They may either accept that amount as a cash prize and end the game, or risk it based on the accuracy of the guess. If the contestant is within $500 of the actual total, they win the Big Bank, the total of the amounts counted by all seven contestants. They must then choose to keep this prize and stop, or risk it for the $1 million grand prize. In order to win, the contestant's guess must be within $25 of the actual total. If the contestant's guess falls outside the margin of error at either stage, the game ends and they leave with nothing.
