= Amanda and the Alien =

1995 American television movie

- Original film poster
- Genre: Comedy; Crime; Drama; Science Fiction
- Written by: Robert Silverberg; Jon Kroll
- Directed by: Jon Kroll
- Starring: Nicole Eggert; John Diehl; Michael Dorn; Stacy Keach
- Music by: Jane Cozzi; Michael Cozzi; Jane Wiedlin
- Country of origin: United States
- Original language: English

Production
- Executive producers: Paul Colichman; Miles A. Copeland III
- Producers: Larry Estes; Jonas Thaler
- Cinematography: Gary Tieche
- Editor: Brian Berdan
- Running time: 96 minutes
- Production companies: Century Group Ltd. IRS Media

Original release
- Network: Showtime
- Release: August 20, 1995

Amanda and the Alien (or Alien Love in the United Kingdom) is a 1995 made-for-cable science fiction comedy film directed by Jon Kroll and starring Nicole Eggert as Amanda Patterson. It premiered on Showtime on August 20, 1995.

The film is loosely based on the short story of the same name written by Robert Silverberg.

== Premise ==
Amanda Patterson, a typical Gen X girl and employee at an upscale clothing store, is leading a relatively lonely and unremarkable life. All this changes when an alien that's been held at a secret military installation escapes by taking over the body of one of the base employees. Amanda finds the fugitive alien and decides to help him hide from the government agents chasing him, a seemingly easy task, as the alien must change host bodies every few days.

Amanda becomes attracted to the alien after it takes over the body of Amanda's unfaithful boyfriend and proves to be a better partner than he is. The two become lovers and she decides to take the alien to its rendezvous spot. They are followed by government agents who have discovered that Amanda is helping the alien evade capture. Eventually the two manage to make it to the rendezvous spot but not without the alien needing to switch bodies a few times. The alien promises that it will tell the others of its kind to avoid using the planet for resources and food, as they try to avoid planets with intelligent lifeforms. Before it leaves, the alien gives Amanda a gift - a vision of the universe, which she later incorporates into her artwork. The film ends with Amanda appearing as a guest on a talk show where the topic is alien encounters. When she tries to explain that the alien only fed out of necessity and was otherwise good, the host mocks her.

== Cast ==
- Nicole Eggert as Amanda Patterson
- John Diehl as Colonel Rosencrans
- Michael Dorn as Lieutenant Vint
- Stacy Keach as Emmitt Mallory
- David Millbern as Lieutenant LeBeau
- Dan O'Connor as Nick
- Raymond D. Turner as Mac
- Alex Meneses as Connie Flores
- Carol-Ann Merrill as Jessica (credited as Carol-Ann Plante)
- Rene Ashton as Shanda (credited as Rene Weisser)
- Michael Bendetti as Charlie Nobles
- Richard Speight Jr. as Joe "Jo-Jo", Cafe Manager
- Johnny Caruso as Bob "Beatnik Bob", The Bassist
- Allen Cutler as Beret, Cafe Patron
- Chadd Nygerges as Dave
- Cindy Morgan as Holly Hoedown, Hotel Clerk
- Jefferson Zuma Jay Wagner as SWAT Leader (credited as Jefferson Wagner)
- Liz Johnson as Thelma, The Waitress
- Ritch Brinkley as Bubba, The Truck Driver
- Danika Kohler Doman as Cindy (uncredited)

== Production ==
Amanda and the Alien was loosely based on the 1983 short story by the same name by Robert Silverberg. Eggert was brought on to portray the titular character of Amanda, while Michael Dorn was cast as the government agent Lieutenant Vint, whose body is eventually taken over by the alien.

== Release ==
Amanda and the Alien premiered on Showtime on August 20, 1995. In The movie was later released on VHS and in 2024, was given a Blu-ray release by the American Genre Film Archive (AGFA). Rifftrax released a version of the movie containing jokes written and performed by Bridget Nelson and Mary Jo Pehl.

Since its initial release in 1995 the movie has been screened several times in theaters such as the Alamo Drafthouse in Austin in 2022.

== Reception ==
The New York Daily News criticized Eggert's acting and wrote that the film "wastes so much time deciding whether it wants to steal from Life-force, Starman, Species or Earth Girls Are Easy that it goes nowhere fast." A reviewer for The News and Advance panned the film, criticizing Eggert's character, the plot, and Eggert's acting, telling readers that children might be interested based on the title but that "if you have to, lock them in the basement to keep them away from this one."
