= Rorke Denver =

American actor and former US Navy SEAL (born 1973)

- Born: Rorke Thomas Denver; October 26, 1973 (age 52); Saratoga, California, U.S.
- Education: Syracuse University; University of San Diego
- Occupations: Actor; author
- Height: 6 ft 1 in (1.85 m)

Rorke Thomas Denver (born October 26, 1973) is an American actor, author, and former United States Navy SEALs commander. Denver is most known for his role as Lieutenant Rorke in the 2012 film Act of Valor and for his appearance as a team leader in the Fox Television series, American Grit.

== Early life and military work ==
Denver was born in Saratoga, California on October 26, 1973, and graduated in 1996 from Syracuse University with a Bachelor of Arts degree. While at Syracuse, Rorke played four years of varsity lacrosse, winning two national titles with Syracuse, and earning All-American honors at defense.

Denver joined the U.S Navy shortly afterwards and graduated from University of San Diego with a master's degree in Global Business Leadership.

In 1999, Denver completed Basic Underwater Demolition/SEAL Training BUD/S class 224 and SEAL tactical training to become a SEAL. He then began a 14-year career in the US military. As assistant officer in charge of BRAVO Platoon at SEAL Team THREE, he was deployed to SOUTHCOM, the Central and South American Area of Operations, where his platoon was the "alert" SEAL team for maritime interdiction, hostage rescue, counter-insurgency and counter-narcotics. As SEAL officer aboard, Denver led his group's response to a murderous uprising in the nation of Liberia as part of Joint Task Force Liberia, launching advanced-force operations, conducting hydrographic beach reconnaissance and helping to get the 26th Marine Expeditionary Unit safely ashore. At Special Boat Team TWELVE, he started the Maritime Capable Air Deployable Boat Detachment, which specialized in parachuting large assault boats from U.S. aircraft. In 2006, Denver was officer in charge of BRAVO Platoon of SEAL Team Three in Iraq's Al Anbar Province in one of the most combat-heavy deployments of any regular SEAL team since Vietnam. Stationed in Habbaniyah, his team conducted more than 190 missions including sniper operations, direct assaults, special reconnaissance and ground patrols. Denver's team has been widely credited, alongside Task Unit Bruiser, consisting of Charlie and Delta Platoon of SEAL Team 3, with propelling the "Tribal Awakening" that helped to neutralize Iraq's insurgency. Denver was awarded the Bronze Star with "V" for valorous action in combat. After returning to the United States, Denver was appointed flag lieutenant to Admiral Joseph Maguire, commanding officer of Naval Special Warfare Command, traveling to Afghanistan and briefing Congress on SEAL operations. In 2009, he became First Phase Officer of BUD/S, then rose to Basic Training Officer. He went on to run all phases of training including advanced sniper, hand-to-hand fighting, communications, diving and language. Denver is also an honor graduate of the United States Army Ranger School. He is now serving as a Commander for the United States Navy Reserve.

In a Wall Street Journal article, Denver stated: "I witnessed the exceptional performance of SEAL, army, and Marine snipers on the battlefields of Iraq and Afghanistan. They struck psychological fear in our enemies and protected countless lives. Chris Kyle and the sniper teams I led made a habit of infiltrating dangerous areas of enemy-controlled ground, established shooting positions and coordinated security for large conventional-unit movement."

== Film and TV career ==
In 2012, Denver starred in the war film Act of Valor. In September 2014, he guest starred on the last two episodes of season four of MeatEater. In 2016, Denver was on the 2016 American reality series, American Grit, as one of the team leaders.

== Author and speaker ==
On February 19, 2013, Denver had his book, Damn Few: Making the Modern SEAL Warrior, published. On April 5, 2016, Denver with Ellis Henican had another book, Worth Dying For: A Navy Seal's Call to a Nation, published.

Denver now speaks for conferences and conventions nationwide. In December 2014, Denver was the keynote speaker for the US Lacrosse Convention. In April 2018, he spoke at the Alabama Trucking Association Convention in Destin, Florida.

== Personal life ==
Denver is married to Tracy Lynn Myers. They have 2 children.

== Filmography ==
=== Film ===
Year	Title	Role	Notes
2012	Act of Valor	Lieutenant Rorke James Engel	War film directed and produced by Mike McCoy and Scott Waugh.

=== Television ===
Year	Title	Role	Notes
2014	MeatEater	Himself	Episodes: "Alaska Bear Hunt, Part 1" (S 4:Ep 17); "Alaska Bear Hunt, Part 2" (S 4:Ep 18)
2016	American Grit	Himself	Reality series, team cadre

== See also ==
- Syracuse Orange men's lacrosse
