= Food to Get You Laid =

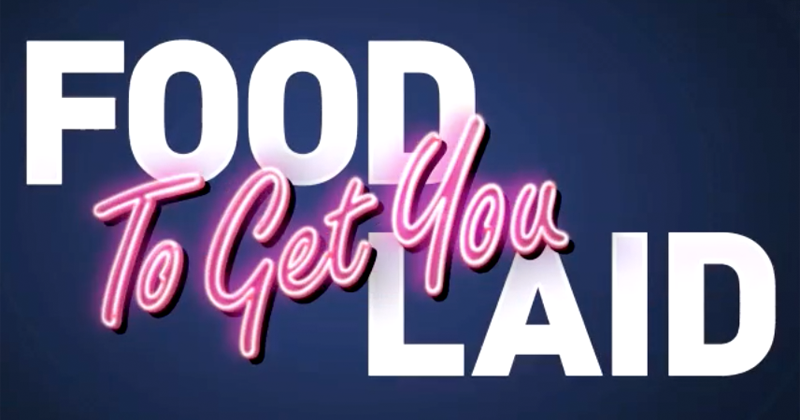
- Genre: Cooking; Reality
- Presented by: Ronnie Woo
- Country of origin: United States
- Original language: English

Production
- Executive producers: Ilan Hall; Rich Kim; Kevin Johnston; Evan Prager; Jesse Ignjatovic; Roy Orecchio
- Running time: 22 minutes
- Production company: Den of Thieves

Original release
- Network: Logo TV
- Release: August 14 – September 25, 2015

Food to Get You Laid is an American cooking reality television series that aired on the Logo TV cable channel from August 14 to September 25, 2015. The series is hosted by celebrity chef Ronnie Woo.

== Format ==
The show features Chef Ronnie Woo visiting the homes of couples and helping one of them cook a romantic meal while the other one is not home, only later to surprise them with an at-home date. The show features real life couples experiencing real relationship changes. Each episode focuses on a different couple trying to take their relationship to the next level through a three-course meal.

"I could have not asked for a better first season of Food To Get You Laid," Woo told The Huffington Post. "This show is very different from other cooking shows in so many ways and it's truly something I'm incredibly proud of. The message of the show is very near and dear to my heart and judging from the overwhelmingly positive feedback I received, I really believe that it resonated with the viewers. My biggest hope for viewers of this show after watching the season is that they are more motivated and fearless about getting in the kitchen and cooking for the people they love. Relationships are all about shared experiences and communication and food is the perfect way to create a conversation... and a memory."

== Episodes ==
No.	Title	Original release date
1	"Ayanna and David"	August 14, 2015
Ayanna and David need Chef Ronnie's help reminding them how to slow down and make quality time for each other. Dishes Made: Sweetened Soy Shrimp Skewers, Seared Scallops with Popcorn Polenta, Coconut Rice Pudding
2	"Drake and Dov"	August 21, 2015
Drake and Dov have survived their long distance relationship, but now Drake desires to start a family and wants Chef Ronnie's help moving this date night in the right direction. Dishes Made: Zucchini Latkes with Homemade Ricotta, Roasted Chicken with Sweet Potato Puree & Sauteed Greens, Ile Flotante with Peanut Butter Creme Anglaise
3	"Jason and Jason"	August 28, 2015
TV personality Jason Carter ("RuPaul's Drag Race") plans to show his boyfriend, who does all of the work around the house, that he appreciates him by cooking a romantic meal. Dishes Made: Roasted Garlic White Bean Hummus, Lamb Chops and Roasted Fingerling Potatoes, Loukoumades
4	"Anjie and Scott"	September 4, 2015
Anjie has a huge crush on her co-worker, Scott; she hopes this date can take her out of the friend zone and into something more. Dishes Made: Beet Gnocchi with Italian Sausage and Sage Browned Butter, Pan Roasted Pork Chops with Vegetable Kabobs, Cherry Chocolate Bourbon Float
5	"Raymond and Kyle"	September 11, 2015
Raymond and Kyle have a lot of love for each other, but not a lot of money; Chef Ronnie will show them how to eat large on a small budget. Dishes Made: Roasted Carrot and Almond Soup, Beef Meatballs with Spinach Pesto Spaghetti, No-Bake Orange Curd Cheesecake
6	"Thomas and Kate"	September 18, 2015
A couple overwhelmed by a home renovation hopes to add some spice back into their relationship. Dishes Made: Radishes Three Ways, Grilled Hangar Steak with Backyard Zucchini, Olive Oil Cake with Boozy Plums
7	"Roxy and Mirza"	September 25, 2015
Roxy is in the doghouse because she still doesn't give her long-time girlfriend, Mirza, the attention she desires. Roxy wants to mend her relationship and prove her love to Mirza. Dishes Made: Avocado Tostadas, Spicy Chipotle Spatchcock Chicken, No-Bake Mexican Chocolate Custard
8	"Jessica and Gabriel"	September 25, 2015
Jessica and Gabe are college sweethearts learning how to be in a relationship. With Chef Ronnie's assistance, Jessica hopes to rekindle their romance. Dishes Made: Arugula Salad with Figs & Pan-Fried Goat Cheese, Butternut Squash & Red Quinoa Arancini with Broccoli Rabe, Pear Crostata

== Production ==
The series was greenlit on June 1, 2015. The network ordered eight half-hour episodes; the production of Food to Get You Laid commenced immediately after the announcement. The show was originally set to premiere on Sunday, August 16, 2015, but was changed to Friday, August 14, 2015. The show is produced by Evan Prager and Jesse Ignjatovic from Den of Thieves, and Ilan Hall, Rich Kim, Kevin Johnston, and Roy Orecchio. The series is filmed in Los Angeles and is broadcast on Logo TV, an American cable network.
