= Gordon Ramsay: Uncharted =

2019 American TV series

- Directed by: Jon Kroll
- Presented by: Gordon Ramsay
- Narrated by: Gordon Ramsay
- Country of origin: United States
- No. of seasons: 4
- No. of episodes: 29

Production
- Executive producers: Elvia Van Es Olivia; Gordon Ramsay; Helen Cooke; Jon Kroll; Lisa Edwards; Tom Willis
- Production companies: Studio Ramsay (season 1–2); Studio Ramsay Global (season 4–present)

Original release
- Network: National Geographic
- Release: July 21, 2019 – June 23, 2024

Gordon Ramsay: Uncharted is an American television series featuring Gordon Ramsay. It premiered on July 21, 2019, on the National Geographic and was broadcast in six episodes for its first season. Jon Kroll directed the series.

On April 29, 2020, it was announced that the second season would premiere on June 7, 2020.

On July 19, 2020, it was announced that the series had been renewed for a third season which was set to premiere on May 31, 2021, on National Geographic with episodes available the next day on Disney+. The first season started broadcasting on Channel 4 in the UK on July 8, 2021. Season 4 was announced after Gordon Ramsay Uncharted was released on Disney+.

== Episodes ==
=== Series overview ===
Season	Episodes	Originally released	
Season	Episodes	First released	Last released
1	6	July 21, 2019	August 25, 2019
2	7	June 7, 2020	July 19, 2020
3	10	May 31, 2021	August 1, 2021
4	6	May 27, 2024	June 23, 2024

=== Season 1 (2019) ===
No. overall	No. in season	Title	Directed by	Original release date	U.S. viewers (millions)
1	1	"Peru's Sacred Valley"	Jon Kroll	July 21, 2019	0.797
Gordon Ramsay embarks on a motorcycle to the Sacred Valley of the Incas in Peru to learn the secrets of high-altitude cooking.
2	2	"New Zealand's Rugged South"	Jon Kroll	July 28, 2019	0.589
Gordon travels to the South Island of New Zealand and Stewart Island to learn about Māori cuisine. He works with up and coming chef Monique Fiso to share secrets about traditional cooking methods and unusual ingredients.
3	3	"The Mountains of Morocco"	Jon Kroll	August 4, 2019	0.491
With help from Moroccan locals, Gordon dives into the food culture and ancient traditions of the indigenous Amazigh (Berber) people.
4	4	"Hawaii's Hana Coast"	Jon Kroll	August 11, 2019	0.594
Gordon travels around Maui's Hana coast meeting colorful locals and collecting unique ingredients for the big feast at the end of the week where he'll have to show his skill to create his own twist on Hawaiian classic cuisine.
5	5	"The Mighty Mekong of Laos"	Jon Kroll	August 18, 2019	0.482
Chef Gordon Ramsay travels to Laos, where he takes on a rapid stretch of white water, kayaking down the Mekong in search of culinary inspiration.
6	6	"Alaska's Panhandle"	Jon Kroll	August 25, 2019	0.393
Gordon Ramsay journeys to the Alaskan Panhandle to discover Alaskan cuisine; he learns how to cook seal with a native Tlingit elder, climbs a rock face in a snowstorm, harvest glacial ice from a fjord with the help of Michelle Costello, and goes grouse hunting before preparing a feast with local chef Lionel Uddipa.

=== Season 2 (2020) ===
No. overall	No. in season	Title	Directed by	Original release date	U.S. viewers (millions)
7	1	"Untamed Tasmania"	Neil P. De Groot	June 7, 2020	0.627
Chef Gordon Ramsay travels to the Australian island of Tasmania: samples sea urchin, dives for crayfish, goes foraging for ingredients, and eats wallaby for the first time. Gordon continues his travels by: fly fishing for trout, trying leatherwood honey, visiting a whisky distillery and cooks a feast of wallaby tartare; seared wallaby in whisky sauce and crayfish pouched in sea urchin butter for guests he met during his trip.
8	2	"The Wilds of South Africa"	Neil P. De Groot	June 14, 2020	0.355
Chef Ramsay visits KwaZulu-Natal, South Africa: he learns how to cook traditional braai barbecue cooking, goes Bass fishing, tries Pele Pele– a popular South African spicy sauce and travels to the coast to collect Mussels. In a Durban market, Gordon buys some Indian spices for the meal he is cooking. Ramsay cooks Steak with Pelepele; and braai-cooked Bass with ushatini (a salsa-like dish with chopped onions, tomatoes, and chili) for a Zulu Chief.
9	3	"Louisiana's Bayou Cuisine"	Neil P. De Groot	June 21, 2020	0.533
Gordon Ramsay travels to southern Louisiana: he goes hunting for nutria – a large type of semiaquatic rodent, tries Trout fishing at the Chandeleur Islands, and enjoys Crawfish – cooked "Viet-Cajun" style. Gordon goes foraging for ingredients, including Bullfrogs. Ramsay cooks Chicken and Andouille Gumbo; Trout with satsumas and a Cassoulet with frog legs for a group of local first responders.
10	4	"Sumatra's Stunning Highlands"	Neil P. De Groot	June 28, 2020	0.473
Gordon Ramsay is on a culinary journey in West Sumatra, Indonesia, where he meets chef William Wongso, who teaches Gordon about Indonesian cuisine. He tries Bika, a teacake made from Coconut; samples Durian fruit; has a go at Pacu jawi (a traditional Indonesian bull race); and enjoys some Beef Rendang on a fishing trip. Ramsay prepares a feast of Beef Rendang and Fish Rendang for the governor of West Sumatra.
11	5	"Guyana's Wild Jungles"	Neil P. De Groot	July 5, 2020	0.504
Chef Ramsay travels to the Amazon Basin in Guyana, to learn more about the country's cuisine. In the capital – Georgetown, Guyanese Chef Delven Adams and Gordon enjoy some of the local food, including Labba Pepperpot. Deep in the rain forest, the chef goes Piranha fishing; snacks on Goliath bird-eating spider; learns how to make Cassareep from cassava; hunts for Spectacled caiman; and tries to catch Arowana fish with his own hand-made bow and arrow. Ramsay cooks a Guyanese feast of Pepperpot chicken, pan seared caiman, and Piranha topped with mango salsa for a Macushi chief and his family.
12	6	"India's Spice Hub"	Neil P. De Groot	July 12, 2020	0.429
Gordon Ramsay is on a foodie adventure in southwestern India. He starts in the Kannur, in Kerala, where he learns about southern Indian cuisine from Chef Shri Bala; goes fishing with locals; and tries an authentic Keralan curry. Travelling inland to the mountains of Coorg, Gordon is taught how to make a black pepper-based Pandi curry; samples local Coffee liqueur; and tries Weaver ant chutney. Chef Ramsay makes a feast of pork Pandi curry; Keralan fish curry and Coffee liqueur topped rice pudding for group of artisan cooks.
13	7	"Norway's Viking Country"	Neil P. De Groot	July 19, 2020	0.492
Chef Gordon Ramsay travels to Norway's west coast. He goes diving for Sea urchin, Clams and Scallops. Travelling inland to Røros, Gordon travels on a Sled pulled by Sled dogs; goes Reindeer herding on a snowmobile and tries some Sámi food, including blood pancakes; and Reindeer stew. Ramasy samples Fermented fish; eats Smalahove (a traditional Western Norwegian dish made from a sheep's head); visits an Akvavit distillery; before cooking a feast of Reindeer stew; seafood soup and hand-roasted scallops for people he met during the week.

=== Season 3 (2021) ===
No. overall	No. in season	Title	Directed by	Original release date	U.S. viewers (millions)
14	1	"Texas Throwdown"	Unknown	May 31, 2021	0.720
In the rugged, vast terrain of south-central Texas, Gordon discovers a greater understanding of what it means to be a Texan.
15	2	"Portugal's Rugged Coast"	Unknown	June 6, 2021	0.381
On the Atlantic coast, Gordon dives into the rich heritage of Portuguese cuisine, influenced by trade routes and its own ingredients’ simple flavors.
16	3	"The Maine Ingredient"	Unknown	June 13, 2021	0.521
Along Maine’s rugged shoreline, Gordon gets an education about how the state’s identity is inextricably linked to its wealth of natural ingredients.
17	4	"Croatia's Coastal Adventure"	Unknown	June 20, 2021	0.468
In the untouched peninsula of Istria, Croatia, Chef Ramsay dives, fishes and chases farm animals to unearth some world-class culinary gems.
18	5	"Lush and Wild Puerto Rico"	Neil P. DeGroot	June 27, 2021	0.485
Gordon explores Puerto Rico in search of local ingredients as the island reclaims its food supply after Hurricane Maria. He meets Chef José Enrique, who flies with him to Flamenco Beach in the island–municipality of Culebra to cook ceviche from locally-sourced mutton snapper. Gordon then sets out to dive in the ocean with a local fisherman to fish for more snapper. Fearing to fly back to the main island by propeller plane, Gordon is airlifted by helicopter to Utuado to meet musician and farmer Draco Rosa in his farm to harvest coffee beans, separating the beans from the skin and have a coffee tasting. Gordon then drives to reach the Tanamá River for a river shrimp, known locally as "chágaras". He rappels down a cliff to reach a suspension bridge to meet with another local fisherman for the shrimp. Gordon then attempts to fish with another local fisherman out in the ocean for tuna or more snapper but were unsuccessful. Needing vegetables, Gordon meets with a local farming couple at El Josco Bravo in Toa Alta, where he assists in plowing soil with oxen, he then harvests cassava, sweet potatoes and okra. Gordon then invites all who've helped him source his ingredients to serve them for a cookout alongside Chef José Enrique's dishes as well.
19	6	"The Great Smoky Mountains"	Unknown	July 4, 2021	0.377
Gordon rappels, kayaks, and forages his way through the Smoky Mountains in a hunt for some of the most unique ingredients the region has to offer.
20	7	"Incredible Iceland"	Unknown	July 11, 2021	0.603
Gordon visits Iceland's west coast to discover ingredients and cooking techniques that utilize the land of fire and ice's native volcanic landscape.
21	8	"Holy Mole Mexico"	Unknown	July 18, 2021	0.406
Gordon attempts to master ancient cooking secrets in Oaxaca, Mexico's culinary capital.
22	9	"Michigan’s Yooper Cuisine"	Unknown	July 25, 2021	0.439
Chef Ramsay dives amongst shipwrecks, helps a local monk, and hunts in the forest to discover the culinary secrets of Michigan's Upper Peninsula.
23	10	"Finland's Midnight Sun"	Unknown	August 1, 2021	N/A
Chef Ramsay explores Lapland in northern Finland by playing swamp football, navigating fierce rapids, fishing for white fish, and cooking in a sauna before going head to head with chef Kim Mikkola in a riverside cook-off.

=== Season 4 (2024) ===
No. overall	No. in season	Title	Directed by	Original release date	U.S. viewers (millions)
24	1	"Unlocking Florida's Keys"	Neil P. DeGroot	May 27, 2024	N/A
25	2	"The Cliffs of Ireland"	Neil P. DeGroot	May 27, 2024	N/A
26	3	"Spain's Galician Coast"	Neil P. DeGroot	June 2, 2024	N/A
27	4	"Big Island Ono"	Neil P. DeGroot	June 9, 2024	N/A
28	5	"Cuba's Savory Secrets"	Neil P. DeGroot	June 16, 2024	N/A
29	6	"A Royal Taste of Jordan"	Neil P. DeGroot	June 23, 2024	N/A
