= Jay Roth =

American lawyer (born 1946)

- Born: October 23, 1946 (age 80); Roslyn Heights, New York, U.S.
- Education: Boston University School of Law; University of Vermont
- Occupation: Lawyer

Jay D. Roth (born October 23, 1946) is an American lawyer who for over two decades served as the National Executive Director of the Directors Guild of America (DGA), the 17,000 member entertainment guild representing the economic and creative rights of directors and members of the directorial team working in film, television, documentaries, news, sports, commercials and new media throughout the world. Following his long-planned retirement in May 2017, Roth began a new role with the Guild as Senior Advisor.

== Early life ==
Roth was born and raised in Roslyn Heights, New York, and graduated with a B.A. degree in history from the University of Vermont in 1968, where he served as editor-in-chief of his school newspaper and a J.D. degree from Boston University School of Law in 1971, where he spent his free time at the legal aid center in Dorchester protecting tenants' rights.

== Career ==
After graduating law school, Roth moved to Portland, Oregon, and worked for legal services doing civil rights and other civil and criminal litigation. In 1973, he moved to Los Angeles, California, doing civil rights and labor litigation for a firm that eventually became Taylor, Roth, Bush & Geffner, where Roth served as managing partner and specialized in representing entertainment guilds, labor organizations and pension, health and welfare funds in labor, entertainment, bankruptcy and transactional matters, including the United Teachers Los Angeles, the International Association of Machinists and Aerospace Workers, Screen Actors Guild (SAG), Directors Guild of America and the International Alliance of Theatrical Stage Employees.

He also served as counsel to several entertainment guilds including the Writers Guild of America (WGA), DGA, and SAG as part of the General Agreement on Tariffs and Trade negotiations in 1993 and as a member of the U.S. government delegation to the treaty negotiations at the World Intellectual Property Organization. He was a founding board member of the Franco-American Cultural Fund of which the Motion Picture Association (MPA), DGA, SAG, WGA, and Société des auteurs, compositeurs et éditeurs de musique (SACEM) are members.

In 1995, Roth was hired as national executive director at the Directors Guild of America. Under his tenure, the guild had a renewed emphasis on three core functions: representing members in collective bargaining; organizing and jurisdiction; and member support; and added departments and executives to address credits, organizing, diversity, government affairs, research and communications.

Together with a negotiations chair, Roth has led successful negotiations on the guild's major collective bargaining agreements eight times since becoming national executive director, including most recently in December 2016. Negotiations are conducted with the Alliance of Motion Picture and Television Producers approximately every three years. In 2004, during delicate negotiations in which the Screen Actors Guild and the Writers Guild of America asked the DGA to take the lead, Daily Variety called Roth the "showbiz point person on making a deal to ensure Hollywood's labor peace."

During Roth's tenure, DGA membership grew by 65% and annual residuals payments to DGA members increased 300% to nearly $400 million. Roth also modernized the Guild's infrastructure and increased internal support for members – tripling the number of field representatives, and growing the contracts department nearly five times in size. The guild's global presence was also expanded – including staff assigned to international affairs and the development of a Coordinating Committee in London.

Roth serves as treasurer of the Motion Picture & Television Fund (MPTF) and is a member of their Board of Directors. He is also a member of the Academy of Motion Picture Arts and Sciences. He formerly chaired the Labor Law Section of the Los Angeles County Bar Association and the American Bar Association Airline-Railway Labor Law Committee and was elected as a Fellow of the College of Labor and Employment Lawyers.

== Honors and awards ==
Roth became the fourth recipient of the DGA Presidents Award at the 69th Annual DGA Awards in February 2017, and the 42nd recipient of the DGA's Honorary Life Member Award at the 60th Annual DGA Awards in January 2008, where he was honored for his outstanding contributions to the DGA and the profession of directing. In July 2017, Roth was presented with the first-ever IATSE Honorary Lifetime Membership Award at the International Alliance of Theatrical Stage Employees 68th Quadrennial Convention in Hollywood, Florida. The award was given in recognition of Roth's decades of contributions to the industry and his 22-year tenure as National Executive Director of the DGA.

In January 2009, French President Nicolas Sarkozy named Roth a "Chevalier de L'Ordre de la Legion d'Honneur" (Knight of the French Legion of Honour), in recognition of his role in promoting cultural exchange including creating the Franco-American Cultural Fund and its successful French film festival in Los Angeles, the City of Lights, City of Angels Film Festival.
