= Maria Kang =

American fitness advocate, coach and blogger

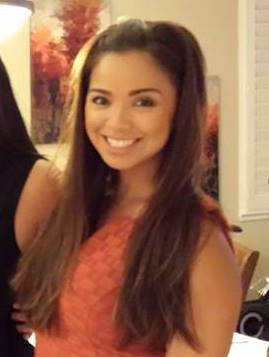
- Born: 1980 (age 45–46); San Francisco, California, U.S.
- Other names: "No Excuse Mom" "Fit Mom"
- Education: Bachelor's in history and international relations
- Alma mater: University of California, Davis
- Occupations: Physical fitness advocate, instructor, blogger, and business owner
- Height: 5 ft 4 in (1.63 m)
- Title: Miss Petite Teen International; Miss San Francisco Chinatown; Miss Philippines USA; Miss Bikini California
- Spouse: David Casler (m. 2010, div. 2023)
- Website: www.mariakang.com

Maria M. Kang-Casler (born 1980 in San Francisco, California), is an American fitness advocate, coach, blogger, and founder of the No Excuse Mom movement, a nonprofit organization which promotes a healthy lifestyle, centered on diet and exercise, for mothers. Residing in the Sacramento, California area, Kang began competing in beauty and fitness competitions as a teenager, winning several including Miss Petite Teen International, Miss Philippines USA, and Miss Bikini California.

After leaving competition, Kang founded the Fitness Without Borders nonprofit organization to advocate for fitness in disadvantaged communities. In 2012, after marrying and giving birth to three sons, Kang posted a photograph of herself in exercise clothes with her children on her exercise group's Facebook page with the caption, "What's Your Excuse?". A year later, the photo went viral and received national media attention.

In January 2014, Kang founded No Excuse Mom and made appearances on local and national media to opine on lifestyle issues. As of mid-2015, approximately 300 No Excuse Mom workout groups had been established in the United States and 25 other countries with 70,000 participants. The groups hold weekly, free workouts aimed primarily at mothers of young children. In March 2015, Kang published her first book with the goal of providing readers with a simplified approach to making a healthy change in lifestyle.

== Early life ==
Kang's mother, Caroline, the daughter of Philippine diplomat George G. Aducayen, Jr., from Cagayan married at 16 and had four children, one boy and three girls, by the time she was 22. Kang was the second child and the oldest of the three girls. The family lived in the Bayview-Hunters Point, San Francisco area of California. Kang's Malaysian Chinese immigrant father, Francis, was a police officer while Caroline worked full-time managing a state-owned parking garage. Starting at age 12, Kang would wake up at 5 a.m. with her mother to help prepare her siblings for the day's activities.

As Kang grew up, her mother Caroline suffered from numerous health-issues related to her being overweight, including diabetes, heart attacks, a stroke, and kidney failure. Kang said that her mother's weight-related health issues affected her deeply. In 1991, the family moved to Elk Grove, California, outside of Sacramento. There, Kang became heavily involved in fitness activities, such as running and aerobics.

Kang attended Laguna Creek High School where she did well with her studies and participated in cheerleading. She was bullied at times, however, by her classmates, including two instances in which a group of girls threw orange juice on her. Kang stated that the stress at times caused her to cut or scratch herself.

== Beauty competitions and start of fitness advocacy ==
At age 16, her mother persuaded Kang to compete in the local Miss Philippines Sacramento beauty pageant. She won first prize and began competing in beauty pageants on a regular basis. Over the next few years, Kang was crowned Miss Petite Teen International, Miss San Francisco Chinatown, and Miss Philippines USA.

Kang then switched to fitness and figure competitions and, in 2003, won Miss Bikini California. Soon after, at a photo shoot at a pool in Los Angeles with other bikini models, Kang felt that the atmosphere and presentation had crossed the line into softcore pornography. Feeling exploited, she walked away from the shoot and never competed again in a beauty or fitness figure event.

Kang graduated from the University of California, Davis in 2002 with a double major in history and international relations. In 2003, she moved to San Francisco and worked at 24 Hour Fitness as a program coordinator and, in 2004, was photographed for covers of Florida Fitness and SF Weekly magazines. At this time, Kang struggled with bulimia, finding herself addicted to the binge eating and purging common to the disorder. She was able to overcome the bulimia by forcing herself to eat without vomiting, and her weight increased until she was about 145 pounds, which she felt was overweight.

In 2005, Kang started a personal website on which she gave her life story and. In 2007, founded a nonprofit organization called Fitness Without Borders to train leaders in low-income communities on the need for fitness. In 2009, Kang began leading free workout sessions for women at Kunsting Family Park in Elk Grove. The next year, she married ex-Marine David Casler, whom she had met on MySpace. Due to an obesity-related medical emergency, Kang's mother was unable to attend the wedding.

== What's Your Excuse? ==
By 2012, Kang had given birth to three sons and appeared several times on local TV programming as an advocate for fitness activities and healthy diets for children. Through exercise and diet, Kang lost approximately 30 pounds after the birth of her third son. She had continued to lead the free workouts at the park and publicized her fitness group to about 50 followers on a Facebook page on which she made frequent posts with advice on exercise and diet. In an effort to gain a wider audience and motivate people to make fitness a priority, on August 25, 2012 Kang had a professional photograph taken of her posing in a sports bra and exercise shorts with her three sons. Above her head was the line, "What's Your Excuse?" with her website's url underneath. Kang posted the photo on her Facebook page. The photo received several thousand comments, mainly positive but some negative. A number of commenters who responded negatively took exception to the line, "What's Your Excuse?" and labeled her a "bully", "narcissist", or "bad mother". On October 3, 2012, Kang was interviewed about the photo on Good Day Sacramento, a local program on KMAX-TV.

On September 26, 2013, Kang reposted the photo on her Facebook page with a non-apology apology for the original post and added a short editorial on the obesity crisis. This time, the photo went viral, being reposted, shared, or linked to on thousands of other Facebook pages and over other social media mediums and forums, resulting in 16 million views within a few weeks. The photo received tens of thousands of comments on Facebook, both positive and negative. Several editorials that accused Kang of fat shaming or being an unfair beneficiary of privilege were penned in The Huffington Post and feminist blog Jezebel. The majority of the responses, however, were supportive, and included an endorsement from Snooki. The national media picked up the story, and Kang was interviewed or profiled on Today, Inside Edition, omg! Insider, Good Morning America, The Kelly File, USA Today, HLN, Balitang America, Geraldo at Large, and Bethenny, among others. Within two months' time, the number of followers of her Facebook page jumped from 23,000 to over 70,000.

In November 2013, Kang responded to publicity over a campaign by Chrystal Bougon, owner of a San Jose plus-size lingerie shop and fat acceptance activist, to take and display photographs of overweight women wearing lingerie. Said Kang on her Facebook page:

I woke up this morning to news stories about how overweight, nearly obese women should be proud of their bodies (as they posed in lingerie). I think we should all accept how any healthy body through good nutrition and exercise manifests, but I’m starting to get annoyed. … I know it’s not easy to break habits and build new ones. I know your environment challenges you and I know making your health a priority amongst the many priorities to stay afloat in today’s world is difficult. But I will tell you this: IT IS WORTH IT. ... We need to change this strange mentality we are breeding in the U.S. and start celebrating people who are a result of hard work, dedication and discipline.

When informed of Kang's comment, an angry Bougon and others reported Kang to Facebook's administration for "hate speech", resulting in Kang's page being blocked for two days. Kang publicized Facebook's action over Instagram, drawing widespread attention over social media and in the press (Facebook later explained that the block was automatic after her page's content was flagged as "offensive" by other users). Bougon initially claimed, falsely, that Kang had posted the comment on Bougon's Facebook page. Both Kang and Bougon were subsequently invited to give their respective side on the disagreement by speaking or being interviewed on CNN, Good Morning America, Access Hollywood, and The Dr. Oz Show. Kang also wrote an editorial, titled "Fit Pride isn't 'Hate Speech'", which was published in Time.

The resulting publicity again increased interest in Kang's Facebook page, eventually attracting more than 320,000 followers. Kang was subsequently featured in a photo spread for the February 2014 edition of Oxygen magazine and the May 2014 cover of Shape magazine's Malaysia edition.

== No Excuse Mom movement ==
In January 2014, Kang rebranded her "Fit Mom" nonprofit fitness advocacy organization as "No Excuse Mom." Under the new name, volunteers provide free, weekly workouts in their local communities. Men and women are welcome at the workouts, but they are mainly structured for mothers with small children. Many of the exercises at the sessions include participation by the children accompanying their mothers. As of mid-2015, approximately 300 No Excuse Mom workout groups had been established in the United States and 25 other countries with 70,000 participants.

Through her website, Kang sells fitness-related instructional and workout DVDs and calendars featuring photos of "fit moms" from her program. She posts photos and testimonials from program participants on her Facebook page. Kang has made further appearances in the media, including as co-host for a periodic segment on KXTX's News10 called "What's Buzzing," usually to comment on living a healthy lifestyle.

The Kang family's main source of income is through the management of two residential care facilities for the elderly in Elk Grove and Sacramento. Her husband, David Casler, who suffered a combat-related traumatic brain injury while working as a private security contractor in Iraq, volunteers for Team Rubicon.

In March 2015, Kang's first book, The No More Excuses Diet: 3 Days to Bust Any Excuse, 3 Weeks to Easy New Eating Habits, 3 Months to Total Transformation, was published by Harmony, a division of Random House. She was invited to appear on Today to talk about the book. Kang says that the book's purpose is to provide a simplified approach to making a healthy change in lifestyle.

== Later events ==
Kang divorced David Casler in May 2023.

In November 2023, Kang was diagnosed with stage 4 colorectal cancer. Kang underwent FOLFOX chemotherapy in 2024, followed by surgery to remove the tumor and about a foot of her colon. She temporarily used a colostomy and later an ileostomy. Subsequent MRI's have not detected a suspicious mass, but she has not been declared "no evidence of disease." Because of her health issues, Kang modified her daily fitness routine to be less strenuous, focusing on walking with some strength training.

== Publications ==
- Kang, Maria (2015). The No More Excuses Diet: 3 Days to Bust Any Excuse, 3 Weeks to Easy New Eating Habits, 3 Months to Total Transformation. Harmony (Random House). ISBN 978-0553419672.
