= J. Rupert Thompson =

American television director and producer (born 1964)

- Born: July 14, 1964 (age 61)
- Occupations: Director; producer
- Spouse: Laura
- Children: 1
- Awards: Directors Guild of America Award for Outstanding Directing – Reality Programs (2005)

J. Rupert Thompson (born July 14, 1964) is an American director and producer of reality television.

His credits include Fear Factor, Wipeout, Kid Nation, American Gladiators, America's Next Top Model, and Estate of Panic. He is often credited for using intensive camera work in various formats of reality television and utilizing a huge number of cameras.

Thompson won the 2005 Directors Guild of America Award for Outstanding Directing – Reality Programs for the premiere of Fear Factor, Season 6.

== Career ==
Thompson started his career as an electrician on horror films such as A Nightmare on Elm Street (1984) and The Blob (1988). He then became a freelance director/cameraman and shot segments for many clients, including the second season of MTV's The Real World based in Los Angeles.

Thompson was a partner at Evolution Film and Tape for ten years, from 1992 to 2002, where he created the children's television series Bug Juice (premiered 1998) with his partner Douglas Ross for the Disney Channel.

== Personal life ==
Thompson resides in California with his wife, Laura, and son, Cassiel.
