= Ettinger =

Ettinger is a surname. Notable people with the surname include:

- Albert J. Ettinger (1919–2013), Canadian politician
- Alice Ettinger (1899–1993), German-American radiologist
- Amber Lee Ettinger (born 1982), American actress and model
- Bracha L. Ettinger (born 1948), Israeli painter
- Churchill Ettinger (1903–1984), American painter
- Cynthia Ettinger, American actress
- Dan Ettinger (born 1971), Israeli conductor
- Don Ettinger (1921–1992), American football player
- Elzbieta Ettinger (1924–2005), Polish-American writer
- Ernest M. Ettinger (1888–1962), Canadian politician
- Gerard Ettinger (1909–2002), British businessman
- Gootchaux Ettinger (1836-1917), French-Brazilian politician and industrialist
- Heidi Ettinger, American theatre producer and set designer
- Jeff Ettinger (born 1958), American businessman, politician, and attorney
- Jessica Ettinger, American broadcaster
- Kurt Ettinger (1901–1982), Austrian fencer
- Mark Ettinger, American musician, conductor, and juggler
- Max Ettinger (1874–1951), Austrian-German-Swiss composer and conductor
- Meir Ettinger (born 1991), Israeli religious radical
- Philip Ettinger (born 1985), American actor
- Robert Ettinger (1918–2011), American academic
- Solomon Ettinger (1802–1856), Polish physician and Yiddish poet
- Stephen Ettinger (born 1989), American cyclist
- Yoram Ettinger (born 1945), Israeli researcher, diplomat, writer, and consultant

== See also ==
- G Ettinger Ltd., British leather goods manufacturer
- Etting
- Ettingen
