= Haworth, New Jersey =

Borough in Bergen County, New Jersey, US

- Borough
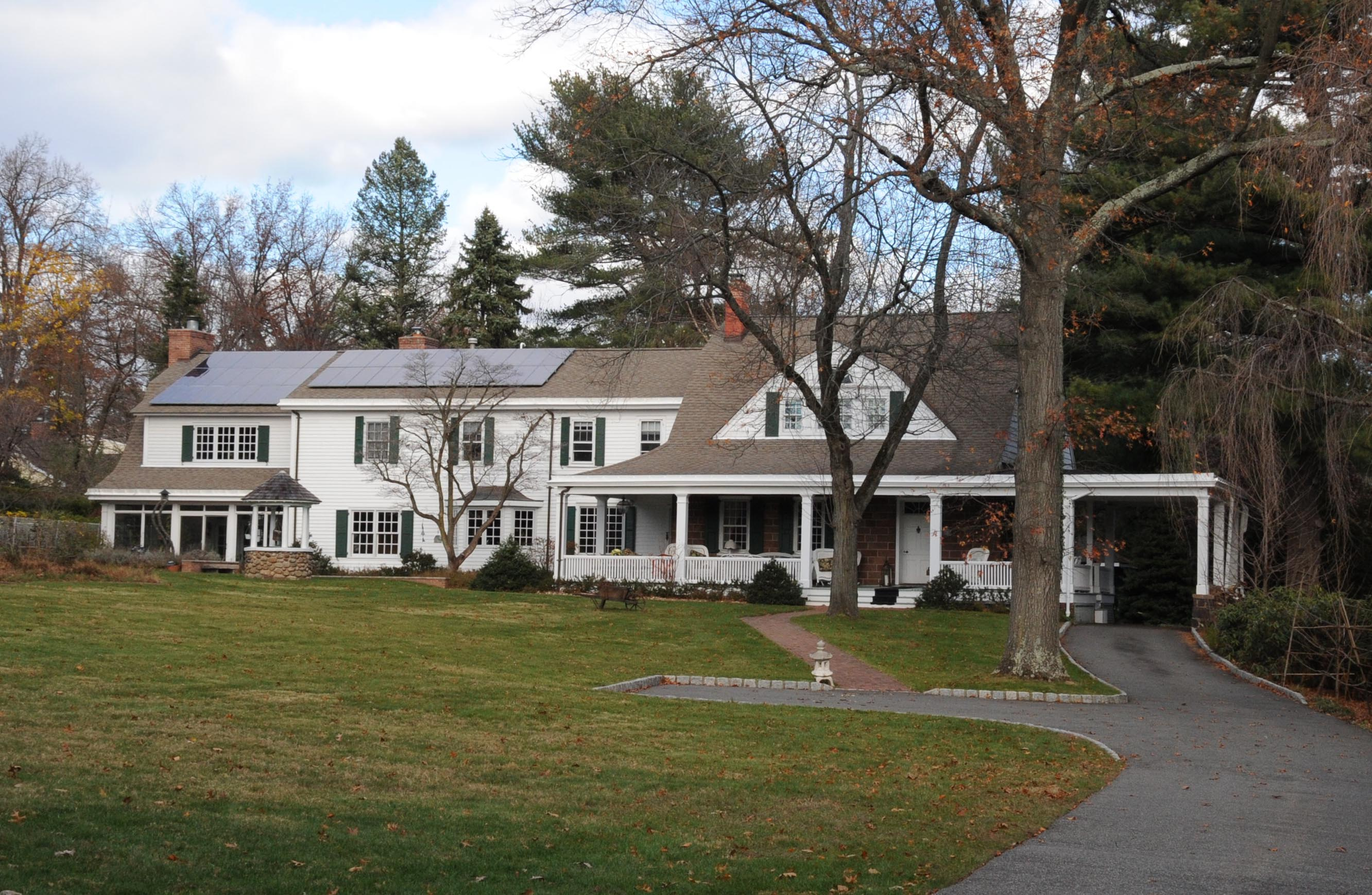
- Garret Zabriskie House

- Location of Haworth in Bergen County highlighted in red (left). Inset map: Location of Bergen County in New Jersey highlighted in orange (right).

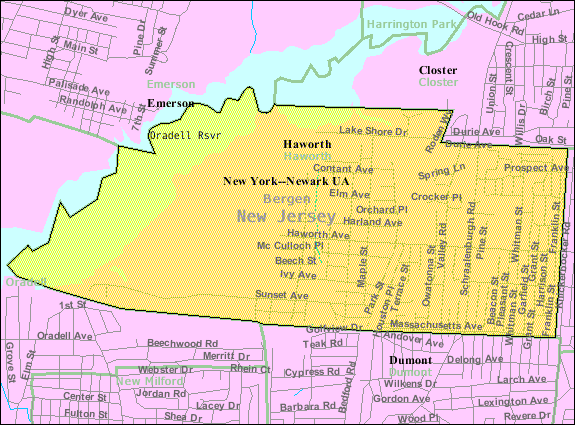
- Census Bureau map of Haworth, New Jersey

- Location in Bergen County Location in New Jersey Location in the United States
- Coordinates: 40.962737°N 73.99747°W
- Country: United States
- State: New Jersey
- County: Bergen
- Incorporated: February 24, 1904
- Named for: Haworth, England

Government
  - Type: Borough
  - Body: Borough Council
  - Mayor: Heather J. Wasser (D, term ends December 31, 2026)
  - Administrator: Greg Zagaja
  - Municipal clerk: Greg Zagaja

Area
  - Total: 2.34 sq mi (6.05 km^{2})
  - Land: 1.94 sq mi (5.02 km^{2})
  - Water: 0.40 sq mi (1.03 km^{2}) 17.01%
  - Rank: 385th of 565 in state 41st of 70 in county
- Elevation: 39 ft (12 m)

Population (2020)
  - Total: 3,343
  - Estimate (2023): 3,322
  - Rank: 434th of 565 in state 65th of 70 in county
  - Density: 1,725.7/sq mi (666.3/km^{2})
  - Rank: 317th of 565 in state 61st of 70 in county
- Time zone: UTC−05:00 (Eastern (EST))
  - Summer (DST): UTC−04:00 (Eastern (EDT))
- ZIP Code: 07641
- Area code: 201
- FIPS code: 3400330540
- GNIS feature ID: 0885248
- Website: www.haworthnj.org

Haworth (English pronunciation: /ˈhɑːwəɹθ/) is a borough in Bergen County, in the U.S. state of New Jersey. As of the 2020 United States census, the borough's population was 3,343, a decrease of 39 (−1.2%) from the 2010 census count of 3,382, which in turn reflected a decline of 8 (−0.2%) from the 3,390 counted in the 2000 census.

Haworth was formed by an act of the New Jersey Legislature on February 24, 1904, from portions of both Dumont borough and Harrington Township. The borough was named for the historic village of Haworth, England.

In September 2012, Business Insider named Haworth the third-best suburb in America.

== Geography ==
According to the United States Census Bureau, the borough had a total area of 2.34 square miles (6.05 km^{2}), including 1.94 square miles (5.02 km^{2}) of land and 0.40 square miles (1.03 km^{2}) of water (17.01%).

The borough borders the Bergen County municipalities of Emerson to the northwest, Closter to the northeast, Demarest to the east, Dumont to the south, and Oradell to the west.

== Demographics ==
Historical population
Census	Pop.	Note	%±
1900	418		—
1910	588		40.7%
1920	748		27.2%
1930	1,042		39.3%
1940	1,419		36.2%
1950	1,612		13.6%
1960	3,215		99.4%
1970	3,760		17.0%
1980	3,509		−6.7%
1990	3,384		−3.6%
2000	3,390		0.2%
2010	3,382		−0.2%
2020	3,343		−1.2%
2023 (est.)	3,322	▼	−0.6%
Population sources: 1910–1920 1910; 1910–1930 1900–2020; 2000 2010 2020

=== Racial and ethnic composition ===
Haworth borough, Bergen County, New Jersey – Racial and ethnic composition Note: the US Census treats Hispanic/Latino as an ethnic category. This table excludes Latinos from the racial categories and assigns them to a separate category. Hispanics/Latinos may be of any race.
Race / Ethnicity (NH = Non-Hispanic)	Pop 2000	Pop 2010	Pop 2020	% 2000	% 2010	% 2020
White alone (NH)	2,909	2,735	2,416	85.81%	80.87%	72.27%
Black or African American alone (NH)	41	37	51	1.21%	1.09%	1.53%
Native American or Alaska Native alone (NH)	0	0	0	0.00%	0.00%	0.00%
Asian alone (NH)	312	397	545	9.20%	11.74%	16.30%
Native Hawaiian or Pacific Islander alone (NH)	0	0	0	0.00%	0.00%	0.00%
Other race alone (NH)	6	6	12	0.18%	0.18%	0.36%
Mixed race or Multiracial (NH)	30	59	128	0.88%	1.74%	3.83%
Hispanic or Latino (any race)	92	148	191	2.71%	4.38%	5.71%
Total	3,390	3,382	3,343	100.00%	100.00%	100.00%

=== 2020 census ===
As of the 2020 census, Haworth had a population of 3,343. The median age was 45.2 years. 23.6% of residents were under the age of 18 and 19.3% of residents were 65 years of age or older. For every 100 females there were 96.3 males, and for every 100 females age 18 and over there were 94.7 males age 18 and over.

100.0% of residents lived in urban areas, while 0.0% lived in rural areas.

There were 1,104 households in Haworth, of which 41.8% had children under the age of 18 living in them. Of all households, 74.5% were married-couple households, 7.2% were households with a male householder and no spouse or partner present, and 15.8% were households with a female householder and no spouse or partner present. About 12.1% of all households were made up of individuals and 7.9% had someone living alone who was 65 years of age or older.

There were 1,148 housing units, of which 3.8% were vacant. The homeowner vacancy rate was 1.6% and the rental vacancy rate was 0.0%.

=== 2010 census ===
The 2010 United States census counted 3,382 people, 1,110 households, and 962 families in the borough. The population density was 1,739.2 per square mile (671.5/km^{2}). There were 1,136 housing units at an average density of 584.2 per square mile (225.6/km^{2}). The racial makeup was 84.57% (2,860) White, 1.15% (39) Black or African American, 0.00% (0) Native American, 11.89% (402) Asian, 0.00% (0) Pacific Islander, 0.47% (16) from other races, and 1.92% (65) from two or more races. Hispanic or Latino of any race were 4.38% (148) of the population.

Of the 1,110 households, 43.2% had children under the age of 18; 77.3% were married couples living together; 6.7% had a female householder with no husband present and 13.3% were non-families. Of all households, 11.7% were made up of individuals and 7.2% had someone living alone who was 65 years of age or older. The average household size was 3.04 and the average family size was 3.31. Same-sex couples headed 4 households in 2010, an increase from the 3 counted in 2000.

28.3% of the population were under the age of 18, 5.9% from 18 to 24, 17.1% from 25 to 44, 33.4% from 45 to 64, and 15.3% who were 65 years of age or older. The median age was 44.2 years. For every 100 females, the population had 96.6 males. For every 100 females ages 18 and older there were 92.8 males.

The Census Bureau's 2006–2010 American Community Survey showed that (in 2010 inflation-adjusted dollars) median household income was $135,694 (with a margin of error of +/− $17,923) and the median family income was $150,093 (+/− $20,623). Males had a median income of $128,958 (+/− $28,633) versus $62,813 (+/− $14,136) for females. The per capita income for the borough was $61,964 (+/− $8,214). About 3.3% of families and 2.5% of the population were below the poverty line, including 3.1% of those under age 18 and 2.7% of those age 65 or over.

=== 2000 census ===
As of the 2000 United States census there were 3,390 people, 1,134 households, and 970 families residing in the borough. The population density was 1,732.3 inhabitants per square mile (668.8/km^{2}). There were 1,146 housing units at an average density of 585.6 per square mile (226.1/km^{2}). The racial makeup of the borough was 87.94% White, 1.21% African American, 9.20% Asian, 0.74% from other races, and 0.91% from two or more races. Hispanic or Latino of any race were 2.71% of the population.

There were 1,134 households, out of which 44.1% had children under the age of 18 living with them, 76.7% were married couples living together, 6.5% had a female householder with no husband present, and 14.4% were non-families. 12.8% of all households were made up of individuals, and 8.1% had someone living alone who was 65 years of age or older. The average household size was 2.98 and the average family size was 3.25.

In the borough the population was spread out, with 28.9% under the age of 18, 4.3% from 18 to 24, 23.6% from 25 to 44, 29.2% from 45 to 64, and 14.0% who were 65 years of age or older. The median age was 41 years. For every 100 females, there were 96.1 males. For every 100 females age 18 and over, there were 91.8 males.

The median income for a household in the borough was $101,836, and the median income for a family was $112,500. Males had a median income of $89,476 versus $49,643 for females. The per capita income for the borough was $45,615. About 1.8% of families and 2.0% of the population were below the poverty line, including 2.4% of those under age 18 and 1.3% of those age 65 or over.

== Parks and recreation ==
- White Beeches Country Club features 18 holes of golf. It has hosted U.S. Open sectional qualifiers, Met Open qualifiers, and the State Open. The course was built in 1915 and designed by Walter Travis.
- Haworth Country Club is a private club, featuring 18 holes of golf. Like White Beeches, Haworth has been host to U.S. Open sectional qualifiers. Officially opened in 1965, the original course was designed by designer Toscana Filenti. In 1997, Haworth obtained full ownership of the Country Club's land from the local water company. In 2000, designer Robert Trent Jones Jr. redesigned the course.
- Haworth Swim Club is a public pool that first opened in 1957.
- Haworth has numerous public parks and fields like Haworth Memorial Field, the Oradell Reservoir Trail, and Myrtle Field.

== Government ==
=== Local government ===
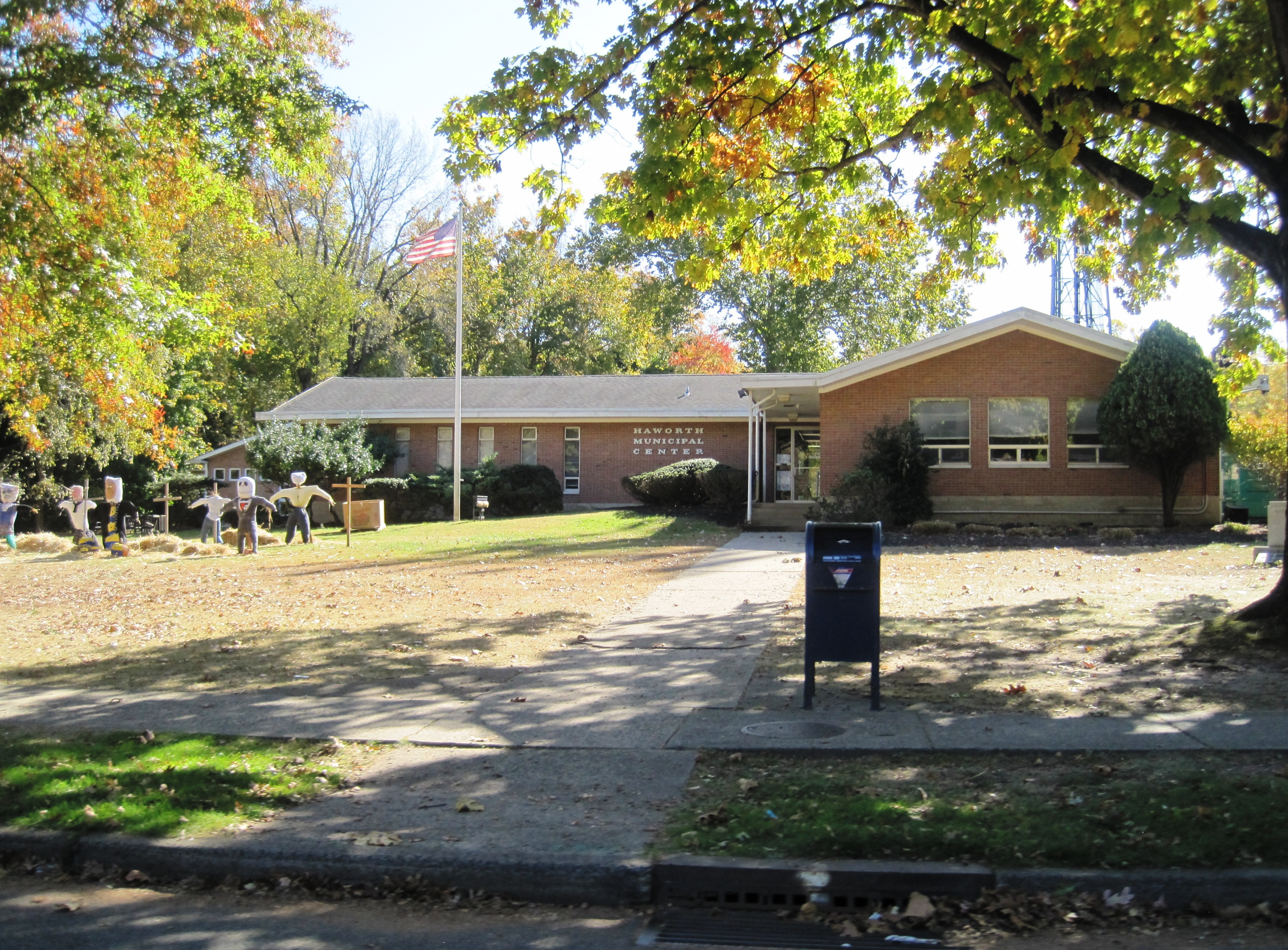
Haworth Municipal Center

Haworth is governed under the borough form of New Jersey municipal government, which is used in 218 municipalities (of the 564) statewide, making it the most common form of government in New Jersey. The governing body is comprised of a mayor and a borough council, with all positions elected at-large on a partisan basis as part of the November general election. A mayor is elected directly by the voters to a four-year term of office. The borough council includes six members elected to serve three-year terms on a staggered basis, with two seats coming up for election each year in a three-year cycle. The borough form of government used by Haworth is a "weak mayor / strong council" government in which council members act as the legislative body with the mayor presiding at meetings and voting only in the event of a tie. The mayor can veto ordinances subject to an override by a two-thirds majority vote of the council. The mayor makes committee and liaison assignments for council members, and most appointments are made by the mayor with the advice and consent of the council.

As of 2024, the mayor of Haworth is Democrat Heather J. Wasser, whose term of office ends on December 31, 2026. Members of the Borough Council are Alanna Z. Davis (D, 2025; elected to serve an unexpired terms), Michele DiIorgi (D, 2024;elected to serve an unexpired term), Glenn Poosikian (D, 2024), Michael A. Rodino (D, 2024), Andrew Rosenberg (R, 2025) and Dina Siciliano (D, 2026).

In January 2023, Howard Lau was appointed to the council seat expiring in December 2024 that was vacated by Heather Wasser when she took office as mayor. In November 2023, Michele DiIorgi was elected to serve the balance of the term of office.

In February 2022, the borough council selected Jackie Guenego from a list of three candidates nominated by the Democratic municipal committee to serve as mayor for a term expiring in December 2022 after Tom Ference stepped down from office following heart surgery. In March 2022, Lisa Dhamija was appointed to fill the council seat expiring in December 2023 that had been held by Jackie Guenego until she took office as mayor.

=== Federal, state and county representation ===
Haworth is located in the 5th Congressional District and is part of New Jersey's 39th state legislative district.

For the 119th United States Congress, New Jersey's 5th congressional district is represented by Josh Gottheimer (D, Wyckoff). New Jersey is represented in the United States Senate by Democrats Cory Booker (Newark, term ends 2027) and Andy Kim (Moorestown, term ends 2031).

For the 2026–2027 session, the 39th legislative district of the New Jersey Legislature is represented in the State Senate by Holly Schepisi (R, River Vale) and in the General Assembly by Robert Auth (R, Old Tappan) and John V. Azzariti (R, Saddle River).

Bergen County is governed by a directly elected County Executive, with legislative functions performed by a Board of County Commissioners comprised of seven members who are elected at-large to three-year terms in partisan elections on a staggered basis, with either two or three seats coming up for election each November; a Chairman and Vice Chairman are selected from among its seven members at a reorganization meeting held every January. As of 2025, the county executive is James J. Tedesco III (D, Paramus), whose four-year term of office ends December 31, 2026.

Bergen County's Commissioners are Chair Mary J. Amoroso (D, Mahwah, 2025), Vice Chair Steven A. Tanelli (D, North Arlington, 2027), Chair Pro Tem Joan Voss (D, Fort Lee, 2026), Rafael Marte (D, Bergenfield, 2026), Germaine M. Ortiz (D, Emerson, 2025), Thomas J. Sullivan Jr. (D, Montvale, 2025) and Tracy Silna Zur (D, Franklin Lakes, 2027).

Bergen County's elected constitutional officials are Clerk John S. Hogan (D, Northvale, 2026), Sheriff Anthony Cureton (D, Englewood, 2027) and Surrogate Michael R. Dressler (D, Cresskill, 2026).

=== Politics ===
As of March 2011, there were a total of 2,319 registered voters in Haworth, of which 777 (33.5% vs. 31.7% countywide) were registered as Democrats, 519 (22.4% vs. 21.1%) were registered as Republicans and 1,023 (44.1% vs. 47.1%) were registered as Unaffiliated. There were no voters registered to other parties. Among the borough's 2010 Census population, 68.6% (vs. 57.1% in Bergen County) were registered to vote, including 95.6% of those ages 18 and over (vs. 73.7% countywide).

Gubernatorial election results for Haworth
Year	Republican		Democratic		Third party(ies)	
Year	No.	%	No.	%	No.	%
2025	645	40.64%	942	59.36%	0	0.00%
2021	524	38.08%	849	61.70%	3	0.22%
2017	421	37.79%	681	61.13%	12	1.08%
2013	774	61.77%	469	37.43%	10	0.80%
2009	601	43.36%	711	51.30%	74	5.34%
2005	607	43.86%	752	54.34%	25	1.81%

In the 2016 presidential election, Democrat Hillary Clinton received 1,158 votes (59.0% vs. 54.2% countywide), ahead of Republican Donald Trump with 708 votes (36.1% vs 41.1% countywide) and other candidates with 67 votes (3.4% vs 3.0% countywide), among the 1,963 ballots cast by the borough's 2,565 registered voters. for a turnout of 76.5% (vs. 73% in Bergen County). In the 2012 presidential election, Democrat Barack Obama received 992 votes (53.3% vs. 54.8% countywide), ahead of Republican Mitt Romney with 842 votes (45.2% vs. 43.5%) and other candidates with 11 votes (0.6% vs. 0.9%), among the 1,861 ballots cast by the borough's 2,451 registered voters, for a turnout of 75.9% (vs. 70.4% in Bergen County). In the 2008 presidential election, Democrat Barack Obama received 1,142 votes (57.2% vs. 53.9% countywide), ahead of Republican John McCain with 823 votes (41.2% vs. 44.5%) and other candidates with 12 votes (0.6% vs. 0.8%), among the 1,998 ballots cast by the borough's 2,445 registered voters, for a turnout of 81.7% (vs. 76.8% in Bergen County). In the 2004 presidential election, Democrat John Kerry received 1,044 votes (54.9% vs. 51.7% countywide), ahead of Republican George W. Bush with 840 votes (44.2% vs. 47.2%) and other candidates with 13 votes (0.7% vs. 0.7%), among the 1,901 ballots cast by the borough's 2,326 registered voters, for a turnout of 81.7% (vs. 76.9% in the whole county).

Presidential elections results
Year	Republican	Democratic
2024	36.3% 733	61.3% 1,237
2020	30.9% 710	67.6% 1,552
2016	36.1% 708	59.0% 1,158
2012	45.2% 842	53.3% 992
2008	41.2% 823	57.2% 1,142
2004	44.2% 840	54.9% 1,044

In the 2013 gubernatorial election, Republican Chris Christie received 61.8% of the vote (774 cast), ahead of Democrat Barbara Buono with 37.4% (469 votes), and other candidates with 0.8% (10 votes), among the 1,287 ballots cast by the borough's 2,384 registered voters (34 ballots were spoiled), for a turnout of 54.0%. In the 2009 gubernatorial election, Democrat Jon Corzine received 711 ballots cast (50.7% vs. 48.0% countywide), ahead of Republican Chris Christie with 601 votes (42.9% vs. 45.8%), Independent Chris Daggett with 69 votes (4.9% vs. 4.7%) and other candidates with 5 votes (0.4% vs. 0.5%), among the 1,401 ballots cast by the borough's 2,426 registered voters, yielding a 57.7% turnout (vs. 50.0% in the county).

United States Senate election results for Haworth1
Year	Republican		Democratic		Third party(ies)	
Year	No.	%	No.	%	No.	%
2024	737	37.24%	1,214	61.34%	28	1.41%
2018	571	38.98%	860	58.70%	34	2.32%
2012	733	42.47%	976	56.55%	17	0.98%
2006	695	45.37%	822	53.66%	15	0.98%

United States Senate election results for Haworth2
Year	Republican		Democratic		Third party(ies)	
Year	No.	%	No.	%	No.	%
2020	740	32.76%	1,503	66.53%	16	0.71%
2014	514	38.73%	803	60.51%	10	0.75%
2013	289	36.49%	500	63.13%	3	0.38%
2008	756	41.00%	1,075	58.30%	13	0.70%

== Education ==
The Haworth Public Schools serves public school students in pre-kindergarten through eighth grade at Haworth Public School. As of the 2024–25 school year, the district, comprised of one school, had an enrollment of 507 students and 55.0 classroom teachers (on an FTE basis), for a student–teacher ratio of 9.2:1.

Public school students in ninth through twelfth grades attend Northern Valley Regional High School at Demarest in Demarest, which serves students from Closter, Demarest and Haworth. The high school is part of the Northern Valley Regional High School District, which also serves students from Harrington Park, Northvale, Norwood and Old Tappan at Northern Valley Regional High School at Old Tappan. As of the 2024–25 school year, the high school had an enrollment of 1,038 students and 95.4 classroom teachers (on an FTE basis), for a student–teacher ratio of 10.9:1. Haworth has one elected seat on the high school district's nine-member board of education.

Public school students from the borough, and all of Bergen County, are eligible to attend the secondary education programs offered by the Bergen County Technical Schools, which include the Bergen County Academies in Hackensack, and the Bergen Tech campus in Teterboro or Paramus. The district offers programs on a shared-time or full-time basis, with admission based on a selective application process and tuition covered by the student's home school district.

== Transportation ==
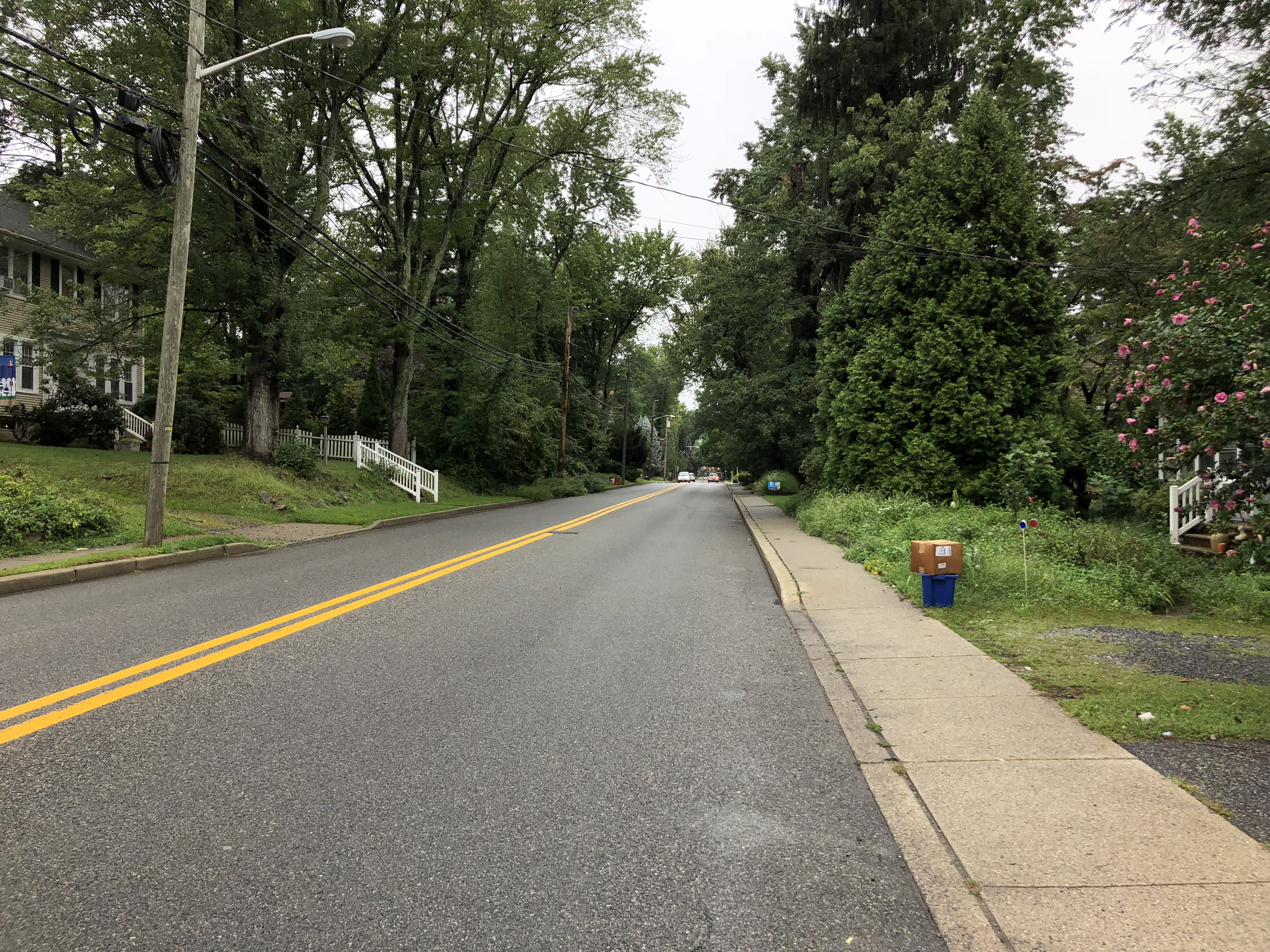
County Route 39 (Schraalenburgh Road) in Haworth

=== Roads and highways ===
As of May 2010, the borough had a total of 23.80 miles (38.30 km) of roadways, of which 19.66 miles (31.64 km) were maintained by the municipality and 4.14 miles (6.66 km) by Bergen County.

The main roads that pass through Haworth are Sunset Avenue and Schraalenburgh Road.

=== Public transportation ===
NJ Transit bus routes 167 and 177 serve the Port Authority Bus Terminal in Midtown Manhattan in New York City, and the 186 serves the George Washington Bridge Bus Terminal in Washington Heights, Upper Manhattan.

== Notable people ==
People who were born in, residents of, or otherwise closely associated with Haworth include:

- Ruth Margery Addoms (1896–1951), botanist at Duke University specializing in the study of plant anatomy and plant physiology
- Steven Blane, Universalist rabbi and cantor who is the founder and dean of the Jewish Spiritual Leaders Institute, an online, one-year rabbinical school, and founder and spiritual leader of Sim Shalom Synagogue, an interactive Universalist cyber-synagogue
- Philip Bosco (1930–2018), actor
- Charles Abel Corwin (1857–1938), staff artist at the Field Museum of Natural History from 1903 to 1938
- John Dalley (born 1935), second violinist of the Guarneri Quartet
- Churchill Ettinger (1903–1984), painter, whose work was part of the painting event in the art competition at the 1936 Summer Olympics
- Denman Fink (1880–1956), artist and illustrator
- Lisa Friel, lawyer and prosecutor who served as chief of the sex crimes unit in the Manhattan District Attorney's office
- Raymond Garramone (1926–1998), politician who served in the New Jersey State Senate representing the 39th Legislative District and as mayor of Haworth
- Donald Genaro (born 1932), industrial designer
- J. Christopher Giancarlo (born 1959), chairman of the United States Commodity Futures Trading Commission
- Elizabeth Gillies (born 1993), actress who appeared in the Nickelodeon show Victorious
- Dick Hall (1930–2023), former MLB relief pitcher
- Charles O'Connor Hennessy (1860–1936), member of the New Jersey Senate who played a major role in the borough's development
- Carl Hubbell (1903–1988), pitcher for the New York Giants
- James Gordon Irving (1913–2012), commercial illustrator and painter, best known for illustrating the early Golden Guide series of nature books
- Rudolph Isley (1939–2023), founding member of The Isley Brothers
- Judith LeClair (born 1958), bassoonist
- Armin K. Lobeck (1886–1958), cartographer, geomorphologist and landscape artist
- Conal O'Brien (born 1956), soap opera director whose work has included All My Children
- Vince O'Brien (1919–2010), character actor who appeared in Annie Hall and as the Shell Answer Man
- Maureen Orcutt (1907–2007), pioneer golfer and reporter for The New York Times
- Frank C. Osmers Jr. (1907–1977), served on the Haworth Borough Council from 1930 to 1934 and as mayor in 1935 and 1936, before representing New Jersey's 9th congressional district from 1939 to 1943 and 1951–1965
- Rebecca Quick (born 1972), CNBC host
- Henry Martyn Robert (1837–1923), military engineer and Brigadier general in the United States Army who was the author of Robert's Rules of Order
- Brooke Shields (born 1965), actress
- Omoyele Sowore (born 1971), Nigerian human rights activist and political prisoner
- William V. Tamborlane (1946–2026), pediatrician and academic who was professor and chief of pediatric endocrinology at Yale School of Medicine
- Clark Terry (1920–2015), jazz trumpeter
- Stanley Turrentine (1934–2000), Grammy-nominated jazz tenor saxophonist and record producer
- Myrtle Vail (1888–1978), radio fixture from 1932 to 1946 who performed the role of "Myrt" on the soap opera Myrt and Marge

== Sources ==
- Municipal Incorporations of the State of New Jersey (according to Counties) prepared by the Division of Local Government, Department of the Treasury (New Jersey); December 1, 1958.
- Clayton, W. Woodford; and Nelson, William. History of Bergen and Passaic Counties, New Jersey, with Biographical Sketches of Many of its Pioneers and Prominent Men. Philadelphia: Everts and Peck, 1882.
- Harvey, Cornelius Burnham (ed.), Genealogical History of Hudson and Bergen Counties, New Jersey. New York: New Jersey Genealogical Publishing Co., 1900.
- Van Valen, James M. History of Bergen County, New Jersey. New York: New Jersey Publishing and Engraving Co., 1900.
- Westervelt, Frances A. (Frances Augusta), 1858–1942, History of Bergen County, New Jersey, 1630–1923, Lewis Historical Publishing Company, 1923.
