= Myrt and Marge =

Myrt and Marge may refer to:

- Myrt and Marge (radio series), a radio serial
- Myrt and Marge (film), a 1933 film based on the radio show starring The Three Stooges
