= Deaths in September 1978 =

The following is a list of notable deaths in September 1978. Entries for each day are listed alphabetically by surname. A typical entry lists information in the following sequence:

- Name, age, country of citizenship at birth, subsequent country of citizenship (if applicable), reason for notability, cause of death (if known), and reference.

== September 1978 ==
=== 2 ===
- Charles F. Blair Jr., 69, American aviation pioneer, while flying a Sikorsky VS-44, he took a non-stop flight from Foynes, Ireland to his native New York, becoming the first aviator to carry passengers and mail on a non-stop flight across the Atlantic Ocean in a flying boat, long after the feat had been accomplished by a number of dirigibles, he drowned due to an aviation accident. Blair was piloting a routine passenger flight from Saint Croix to Saint Thomas, when the port engine suffered catastrophic failure. Falling into the ocean, the plane sank in a matter of minutes and settled to the bottom in 85 ft (26 m) of water. Blair and three of his passengers drowned, while the rest of the passengers were rescued by local boats.

=== 4 ===
- Leonora Cohen, 105, English suffragette and trade unionist,by 1923, she became the first woman president of the Yorkshire Federation of Trades Councils, in 1924, Cohen was appointed a magistrate; she was one of the first women appointed to the bench and a justice of the peace for 25 years, in the 1928 Birthday Honours, she was awarded the Order of the British Empire for recognition of her social work.

=== 5 ===
- Nikodim Rotov, 48, he served as the Russian Orthodox metropolitan of Leningrad and Novgorod from 1963 until his death in office in 1978,according to the Mitrokhin Archive, which claimed deep Communist penetration of the Russian Orthodox Church, Nikodim was a KGB agent, whose ecumenical activity with the Roman Catholic Church and the WCC served to further Soviet goals, Nikodim is said to have participated in negotiating a secret 1960s agreement between Soviet and Vatican officials that authorized Eastern Orthodox participation in the Second Vatican Council (1962 –1965) in exchange for non-condemnation of atheistic communism during the conciliar assemblies, he suddenly collapsed and died while visiting Rome for the installation of Pope John Paul I; the new pope prayed over Nikodim in his final moments.

=== 7 ===
- Keith Moon, 32, English musician, primarily known as a drummer for the rock band the Who, death caused from an overdose of clomethiazole, the police determined that there were 32 clomethiazole pills in Moon's system; six were digested; and the other 26 were undigested when he died. Max Glatt, an authority on alcoholism, wrote in The Sunday Times that Moon should never have been given the drug.Clomethiazole, a sedative, was prescribed to alleviate Moon's alcohol withdrawal symptoms. Moon wanted to get sober, but because of his fear of psychiatric hospitals, he wanted to do it at home. Clomethiazole is discouraged for unsupervised detoxification because of its addictive potential, its tendency to induce tolerance, and its risk of death when mixed with alcohol.

=== 8 ===
- Ricardo Zamora, 77, Spanish football player and manager, in 1929 while playing for Spain against England, he carried on playing despite breaking his sternum, and Spain won the game 4–3, becoming the first team from outside the British Isles to defeat England. He is posthumously regarded as one of the greatest goalkeepers of his generation, along with Gianpiero Combi and František Plánička, as well as one of the greatest of all time.

=== 9 ===
- Hugh MacDiarmid, 86, Scottish poet, journalist, essayist and political figure, he helped found the National Party of Scotland in 1928, but was expelled from the party during the 1930s, he, was at times a member of the Communist Party of Great Britain, but he was expelled twice, because his nationalist views did not actually agree with those of the party, anticipating the Blitz, MacDiarmid wrote a poem entitled "On The Imminent Destruction Of London, June 1940", where he celebrated the Luftwaffe's potential bombing of London and compared the city which he hated to "a foul disease": "death and destruction has gone out from London all over the world".
- Barbara Shermund, 79, American cartoonist,she began her career in New York City by creating spot illustrations, her first cartoon appeared in January 1926, she created covers, illustration and cartoons for Esquire, Life and Collier's, in February 1925, Harold Ross launched The New Yorker as a humorous Manhattan-centric magazine,; Shermund was one of the first women cartoonists to work for The New Yorker after its launch, Shermund supplied a cover in June and in October and she became a frequent contributor, over 600 of her cartoons were published in The New Yorker and she also contributed nine cover illustrations for the magazine, Shermund wrote her own captions under her cartoons, her creations were satirical and often had a feminist and poignant tone, reflecting the early 20th century view of the New Woman.
- Jack L. Warner, 86, Canadian-born American film studio executive, he co-founded the studio Warner Bros. Pictures in 1923,having bought out the shares of his brothers and partners, Warner became the studio's largest stockholder in July 1956 and appointed himself as its new president, Warner opposed European fascism and criticized Nazi Germany well before the United States' entry into World War II,he died due to a heart inflammation (edema) at the Cedars-Sinai Hospital, where he was hospitalized since mid-August 1978.

=== 11 ===
- Valerian Gracias, 77, Indian cardinal, he served as the archbishop of Bombay from 1950 until his death in office in 1978, he demonstrated his support of Goan nationalism and opposition to the Portuguese colonial rule by presenting an image of the Virgin Mary as an indigenous Indian, at a time when the populace was still accustomed to European representations of Mary, in 1970, Gracias was one of the 15 prelates chosen to organize the 1971 Synod of Bishops, and he supported Pope Paul VI against critics of his approach to church governance and his insistence on priestly celibacy, death caused by cancer.
- Georgi Markov, 49, Bulgarian expatriate novelist, screenwriter, playwright, dissident writer, and journalist for the BBC World Service, he was assassinated in London. While waiting at a bus stop, Markov felt a slight sharp pain, as if from an insect bite or sting, on his right thigh, and he noticed an unknown man behind him. That evening, Markov developed a fever and was admitted to St James' Hospital in Balham, where he died four days later, on 11 September 1978.His autopsy indicated that he was probably poisoned with ricin.Regardless of whether the doctors treating Markov had known that the poison might have been ricin, the result would have been the same, as no antidote exists for ricin. The KGB defector Oleg Kalugin alleged that the Bulgarian Secret Service arranged Markov's murder with help from the Soviet KGB. Nobody has been charged with Markov's murder, largely because most documents relating to it are unavailable and probably destroyed. Kalugin said that Markov had been killed through the use of an umbrella gun.
- Kō Nakahira, 52, Japanese film director, after dropping out of the University of Tokyo in 1949, Nakahira joined the entertainment company Shochiku as an assistant director, as an assistant director, he worked for such filmmakers as Akira Kurosawa, Eisuke Takizawa, Keisuke Kinoshita and Yuzo Kawashima, death caused by stomach cancer.
- Ronnie Peterson, 34, Swedish racing driver, he is regarded posthumously to be one of the best Formula One drivers who never won a championship, as well as the best racing driver ever produced by Sweden,he was one of several drivers injured in the same accident during the 1978 Italian Grand Prix, but he was initially thought to have only suffered leg injuries, with none of them seen as potentially lethal. At the hospital, Peterson's X-rays showed that he had about 27 fractures in his legs and feet. After discussion with him, Peterson was sent to intensive care so that the surgeons could operate to stabilize the bones. There was some level of dispute between the doctors regarding whether all fractures should be immediately fixed or not. During the night, Peterson's condition worsened, and he was diagnosed with fat embolism. By morning, he was in full kidney failure due to the embolism, and he was soon declared dead.
- Curtis Shake, 91, American jurist, politician, and writer,in early 1947, he was appointed as the presiding judge over the IG Farben trial for war crimes, the Farben trial began on August 27, 1947, and concluded in mid-June 1948, the case was primarily based on the Farben defendants' "knowing participation" in "Nazi plans for conquest," even before World War II began, and for the Farben firm's use of slave labor in manufacturing synthetic rubber during the war,; the company's production site used laborers from the adjacent German concentration camp at Auschwitz, Shake presided over the tribunal, which rendered its verdicts on July 29–30, 1948, more than a year after the trial began; ten of the defendants were acquitted on all counts; the remaining thirteen received prison sentences that ranged from two to eight years, considered mild punishments compared to the gravity of the indictments.the news reporters harshly criticized Shake for the relatively light sentences in the Farben case and made allegations that he had been partial to the German defendants, which he denied, Shake countered the criticisms by arguing that the tribunal "had worked hard to apply international law" in the trial.

=== 12 ===
- Frank Ferguson, 78, American character actor,in his youth, he was one of the first directors of the Pasadena Community Playhouse, where he both directed and acted in many plays,Ferguson had a well-known role as the Swedish ranch handyman Gus Broeberg on the 1956 children's Western television series My Friend Flicka, Ferguson played the role of Eli Carson in the primetime soap opera Peyton Place and reprised the role in the later daytime version Return to Peyton Place.
- O. E. Hasse, 75, German actor and theatre director,he was the German dubbing voice of the actors Charles Laughton, Humphrey Bogart, Spencer Tracy and Clark Gable. He died in West Berlin and is buried at the Waldfriedhof Dahlem.

=== 14 ===
- Jone Morino, 82, Italian actress and acting teacher, in cinema, she started being active in the 1920s, appearing in a few silent films, and after a long pause reprised her film career in the late 1930s, specializing in comedic character roles, from 1954 until 1969, she served as an acting teacher at the Accademia Nazionale d'Arte Drammatica Silvio D'Amico. battling depression, she committed suicide by jumping into the river Tiber and drowning.

=== 17 ===
- Willy Messerschmitt, 80, German aircraft designer and manufacturer,in 1948, Messerschmitt was convicted of collaborating with the Nazi regime, he was released after two years in prison, resuming his position as head of his manufacturing company,; since Germany was forbidden to manufacture aircraft until 1955, he turned his company to manufacturing prefabricated buildings, sewing machines, and small cars – most notably the microcar Messerschmitt Kabinenroller (1953–1955),; exporting his talents to Francoist Spain, Messerschmitt designed the Hispano HA-200 jet trainer for Hispano Aviación in 1952 before eventually being allowed to return to aircraft manufacturing in Germany to licence-produce the Fiat G.91 and then the Lockheed F-104 Starfighter for the West German Air Force.

=== 18 ===
- Ann Shoemaker, 87, American actress,she portrayed Sara Roosevelt, the mother of Franklin D. Roosevelt, in both the stage and film versions of Sunrise at Campobello.
- Myrtle Vail, 90, American vaudevillian and actress,lead actress, creator and main writer of the radio soap opera Myrt and Marge, Vail attempted to revive the show in 1946, in a syndicated version which sometimes included updated re-writes of the original scripts, according to radio historian John Dunning,; the new show was a short-lived ratings failure, and the one-time favorite disappeared quietly in 1947, approximately 110 episodes of Myrt & Marge survive, most from the 1946-47 syndication revival.

=== 22 ===
- A. J. Bakunas, 27, American stunt performer and former gym teacher, in 1978, Bakunas set a world record with a 70.1-metre (230 ft) fall from a helicopter for the action comedy film Hooper,Bakunas was later determined to retake the record,; he returned to Lexington, Kentucky, in order to perform a 96-metre (310 ft) jump from the 22nd floor of a construction site, where he had previously successfully fallen nine stories; while performing the fall, and reaching an estimated speed of 115 miles per hour (185 km/h), his airbag split on impact. Bakunas died of his injuries the following day.
- Jack Shaindlin, 69, Russian-American composer, arranger, conductor, and music director from Crimea, he composed the 1951 fanfare for the television studio Screen Gems, he is sometimes credited with composing the opening and closing theme of the superhero television series Adventures of Superman, despite the official attribution of the theme to Leon Klatzkin.

=== 24 ===
- Lyman Bostock, 27, American professional baseball player, after the 1977 season ended, he became one of baseball's earliest big-money free agents, signing with the California Angels, then-owned by Gene Autry, he was fatally injured with a round from a .410 caliber shotgun while seated in his uncle's car. The shooter Leonard Smith was attempting to kill his estranged wife Barbara Smith in an ambush attack; however, Bostock was seated between Barbara and the position from which Leonard was firing. Instead of striking her, the shot struck Bostock squarely in the right temple. Bostock died two hours later at a hospital.
- Ruth Etting, 81, American singer and actress,in Hollywood, Etting made a long series of short films between 1929 and 1936, and three feature films in 1933 and 1934,; she described her short films as either having a simple plot to allow for her to sing two songs or having no plot at all.
- Manne Siegbahn, 91, Swedish physicist,he began his studies of X-ray spectroscopy in 1914, he developed improved experimental apparatus which allowed him to make very accurate measurements of the X-ray wavelengths produced by the atoms of different elements,; he also found that several of the spectral lines which had already been discovered consisted of more components than previously thought,; by studying these components and improving the spectrometer, Siegbahn got an almost complete understanding of the electron shell, he developed a convention for naming the different spectral lines that are characteristic to elements in X-ray spectroscopy, the Siegbahn notation,; Siegbahn's precision measurements drove many developments in quantum theory and atomic physics.

=== 25 ===
- Claire Adams, 80, Canadian actress and former nurse, early in her acting career, her performances were criticized for their perceived lack of emotion, but by 1925 the film critics were praising her for intensely emotional roles and were describing her as a firebrand.
- Bret Morrison, 66, American actor and cabaret singer, he best known as the voice of the character The Shadow, a mysterious crusader for law and order, the Shadow-historian Anthony Tollin argues that while the other actors who portrayed the Shadow were capable performers, Morrison was the one most devoted to treating the role seriously and the one who put the most effort into researching background details for authenticity, he died due to a heart attack while sitting within his parked car. His heart attack was attributed to the high temperatures of the day.

=== 28 ===
- Pope John Paul I, 65, head of the Catholic Church and sovereign of Vatican City from late August 1978 until his death in office, only 33 days following his election,; after his election, he quickly made several decisions that would "humanise" the office of the pope, he was the first modern pope to speak in the singular form, using 'I' instead of the royal we, he initially refused to use the ceremonial throne sedia gestatoria until others convinced him of its need to allow himself to be seen by crowds, he was the first pope to refuse to be crowned, death probably caused by a heart attack. He was found dead in his own bed, with reading material and a bedside lamp which was still lit.

=== 30 ===
- Edgar Bergen, 75, American ventriloquist, comedian, actor, and vaudevillian, he and his puppet character Charlie McCarthy made their radio debut in December 1936, and they were then given regular cast roles as part of The Chase and Sanborn Hour, under various sponsors (and two different networks), the duo were on the air from May 9, 1937, to July 1, 1956, the popularity of a ventriloquist on radio, when one could see neither the dummies nor his skill, surprised and puzzled many critics, then and now,; even knowing that Bergen provided the voice, listeners perceived Charlie as a genuine person, death caused from kidney disease, only three days following the opening of his Farewell to Show Business engagement in Las Vegas.

== Sources ==
- Bellamy, Suzanne S. (Fall 2008). "Hoosier Justice and Nuremberg: Judge Curtis Shake". Traces of Indiana and Midwestern History. 20 (4). Indianapolis: Indiana Historical Society: 20–29.
- Buhle, Paul; Wagner, Dave (2002). Radical Hollywood: The Untold Story Behind America's Favorite Movies. New York: The New Press. ISBN 1-56584-718-0
- Fletcher, Tony (1998). Dear Boy: The Life of Keith Moon. Omnibus Press. ISBN 978-1-84449-807-9.
- ———; Sperling, Cass Warner; Millner, Cork (1998). Hollywood be Thy Name: The Warner Brothers Story. University Press of Kentucky. ISBN 0-8131-0958-2.
- Spring, Katherine (2011). "'To Sustain Illusion is All That is Necessary': The Authenticity of Song Performance in Early American Sound Cinema". Film History. 23 (3). Indiana University Press: 285. doi:10.2979/filmhistory.23.3.285. ISSN 0892-2160. S2CID 142022287.
- Thomas, Bob (1990). Clown Prince of Hollywood: The Antic Life and Time of Jack L. Warner. McGraw-Hill Ryerson, Limited. ISBN 978-0-07-064259-1.
