= Myrt =

Myrt may refer to:

- World War II Allied reporting name of the Japanese Nakajima C6N reconnaissance aircraft
- Myrtle "Myrt" Spear, a title character of the American radio show Myrt and Marge (1931–1942) and a 1933 film based on it
- Myrt Basing (1900–1957), American National Football League player
