= White Beeches Country Club =

Country club in Haworth, New Jersey

Coordinates: 40°57′29″N 74°00′03″W

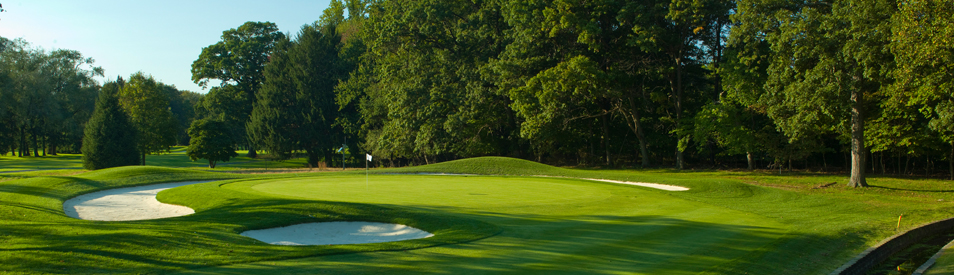
White Beeches

The White Beeches Golf and Country Club is located in Haworth, New Jersey, USA, and has 18 holes of golf. It has hosted U.S. Open sectional qualifiers, Met Open qualifiers and the State Open.

The club derives its name from the beech trees that once adorned the 18-hole course, which has been in operation for over a century.

== History ==
The course was built in 1918 and designed by Walter Travis. It plays to a par 72 from about 6,500 yards.

It hosted its second annual AJGA tournament on the 15–18 August 2011.

The head professional is the ex-tour player, Jim McGovern, and the assistant professional is Bryan Romagnoli.

The course also overlaps the municipalities of Oradell, New Jersey, and Dumont, New Jersey.
