= Donna Damerel =

American actress (1912–1941)

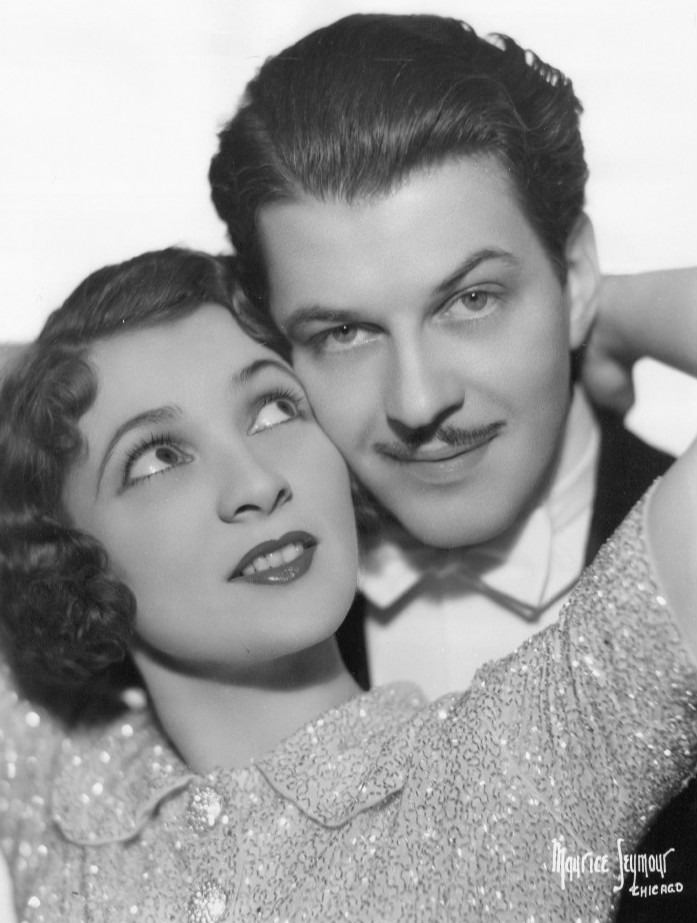
- Damerel as Marge Minter with Vinton Hayworth as Jack Arnold from the Myrt and Marge radio show, 1935
- Born: July 8, 1912; Chicago, Illinois, U.S.
- Died: February 15, 1941 (aged 28); Englewood, New Jersey, U.S.
- Occupation: Actress
- Mother: Myrtle Vail Damerel

Donna Damerel (July 8, 1912 – February 15, 1941) was an American actress.

== Early years ==
Damerel was born on July 8, 1912, in Chicago, the daughter of vaudeville performers George Damerel and Myrtle Vail. She had one brother. When she was 15, she left home to join the chorus of a musical comedy. (Her mother had also left home at age 15 to pursue an acting career.) Later, she joined her parents' vaudeville team.

== Career ==
After vaudeville's decline ended the Damerels' performing team, the family lived comfortably until "our savings were wiped out, and we were destitute." Damerel and her mother began to work on radio. They debuted the Myrt and Marge radio program in Chicago on November 2, 1931, with Damerel portraying the daughter, Marge, and Vail portraying the mother, Myrt.

A 1932 poll conducted by a radio magazine named Damerel radio's "it girl". The recognition included looks, microphone personality, and voice as 15,704 listeners participated in the survey.

Damerel and Vail also starred in the Universal film Myrt and Marge (1933), which was based on the radio program. In 1938, they performed in Yes, My Darling Daughter in Yonkers, New York, at the Warburton Theatre.

== Personal life and death ==
Damerel was divorced from singer William J. Kretsinger on December 22, 1939. At the time of her death she was married to Peter J. Fick. She had two sons by previous marriages. One of her sons was director and screenwriter Charles B. Griffith.

She died on February 15, 1941, shortly after giving birth to a son in Englewood Hospital in Englewood, New Jersey. She was 28 years old. The baby survived. Doctors said her health had appeared to be good when she entered the hospital.
