= Vince O'Brien =

O'Brien in Dark Shadows as Lt. Dan Riley

Vincent J. O'Brien (January 11, 1919 – June 19, 2010) was an American character actor, who appeared as a doctor in Woody Allen's film Annie Hall (1977) and appeared on television and in print ads as the Shell Answer Man.

O'Brien grew up in New Britain, Connecticut and served in the United States Army during World War II. He attended Carnegie Mellon University in Pittsburgh, where he was awarded a bachelor's degree in 1949 with a major in drama. In 1950 he moved to New York City, where he started his acting career. O'Brien's balding, mature look helped gain him roles as authority figures, with his son recalling that "he always had that older look" even in his early acting days.

In the 1950s, he appeared in 23 episodes of the television series Westinghouse Studio One, including an episode with Walter Matthau. During the 1960s, O'Brien appeared on the soap operas Dark Shadows, and The Edge of Night and twice, as two different characters in two different decades, on The Guiding Light as Colonel Grove Mason (1969–1970) and Dante "Pops Cooper" Kouperakis (1987–1990). In the late 1960s and through much of the 1970s, O'Brien appeared on television and print advertisements as the Shell Answer Man, a job that he felt was "like hitting the state lottery". During the 1970s he appeared on Ryan's Hope and played a hotel doctor in Woody Allen's 1977 comedy Annie Hall. In the 1990s he had a recurring role as a judge on Law & Order. His final film appearances were in the movies Quiz Show and Six Degrees of Separation.

He appeared on Broadway in the musical Promises, Promises. He also appeared on stage in local productions of Advise and Consent, Death of a Salesman and The Fantasticks.

A resident of Haworth, New Jersey, O'Brien died at age 91 of heart failure on June 19, 2010. He was buried in the George Washington Memorial Park in Paramus, New Jersey. He was survived by his wife Kate (born Delphine Force), a daughter, four sons, five grandchildren and four great-grandchildren. His son Conal O'Brien was a director of the soap opera All My Children from 1987 to 2009, and is now a director for the soap opera The Young and the Restless.

== Filmography ==
Year	Title	Role	Notes
1961	The Hoodlum Priest	Assistant District Attorney	
1970	The Cross and the Switchblade	Judge	
1976	Damien's Island		
1977	Annie Hall	Hotel Doctor	
1993	Six Degrees of Separation	Grandfather at Baptism	
1994	Quiz Show	Bunny Wilson	
