= Myrt and Marge (film) =

1933 film by Al Boasberg

- Directed by: Al Boasberg
- Produced by: Bryan Foy; Eddie Foy Jr.
- Starring: Myrtle Vail; Donna Damerel; Ted Healy; Moe Howard; Larry Fine; Curly Howard; Bonnie Bonnell
- Cinematography: Joseph Valentine
- Edited by: Arthur Hilton
- Distributed by: Universal Studios
- Release date: December 4, 1933
- Running time: 65 minutes
- Country: United States
- Language: English

Myrt and Marge is a 1933 American pre-Code Universal Studios feature film, starring Myrtle Vail and Donna Damerel. The film is noteworthy today because it co-stars Ted Healy and his Stooges, shortly before the trio split from him and became the Three Stooges (Curly Howard, Moe Howard and Larry Fine). The team included Bonnie Bonnell, who was a short-lived female Stooge.

== Plot ==
Myrt Spear's touring vaudeville revue is full of talent and bound for Broadway, but low on funds. Conniving and lecherous producer Mr. Jackson helps the show so he can romance the young star, Marge Minter.

Myrt, along with Marge's boyfriend Eddie Hanley, steps in to save the revue and Marge. Mullins and his helpers are stagehands with hopes to join the show, but mostly deal with the antics of backstage crasher Bonnie.

== Cast ==
- Myrtle Vail as Myrt Spear
- Donna Damerel as Marge Minster
- Eddie Foy, Jr. as Eddie Hanley
- Ted Healy as Mullins
- Thomas E. Jackson as Jackson the Angel
- Ray Hedge as Clarence
- Grace Hayes as Grace
- Trixie Friganza as Mrs. Minter
- J. Farrell MacDonald as Grady
- Moe Howard as Mullins' Helper
- Larry Fine as Mullins' Helper
- Curly Howard as Mullins' Helper
- Bonnie Bonnell as Suzannah (uncredited)

== Radio program ==
Myrt and Marge was a popular radio serial created by and starring Myrtle Vail and Damerel. The show aired on CBS Radio from 1931 to 1946, and in syndication from 1946 to 1947.

== Reception ==
The film was a box office disappointment for Universal.

== In popular culture ==
This film is shown in a scene from the 2000 film O Brother, Where Art Thou?

== See also ==
- The Three Stooges filmography
