= Charles Abel Corwin =

American artist

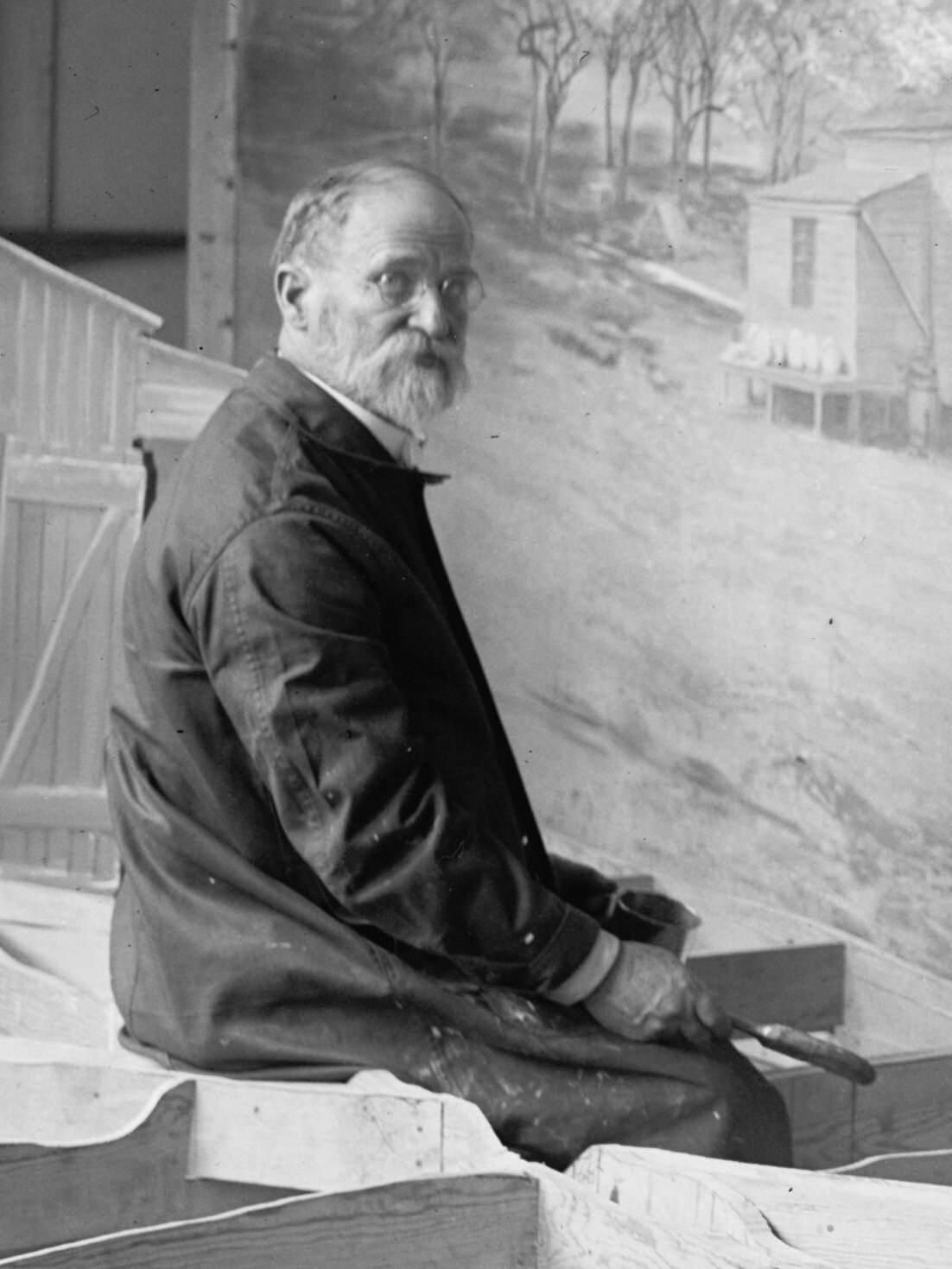
- Corwin in 1923
- Born: January 6, 1857; Newburgh, New York, U S.
- Died: January 28, 1938 (aged 81)
- Occupation: Staff artist at the Field Museum of Natural History

Charles Abel Corwin (January 6, 1857 – January 28, 1938) was an American painter and lithographer.

He was a staff artist at the Field Museum of Natural History from 1903 to 1938. He mainly worked on the museum murals and the habitat background preparation. He also taught at the Art Institute in Chicago.

In the 1910 American Art Annual, he was listed as being based in Haworth, New Jersey.
