= Yoram Ettinger =

Israeli demographer

- יורם אטינגר
- Born: Tel Aviv, Israel
- Education: University of Texas at El Paso
- Title: Ambassador (ret.)
- Spouse: Ora Ettinger
- Children: 3
- Website: http://theettingerreport.com/

Yoram Ettinger (Hebrew: יורם אטינגר) is an Israeli researcher, diplomat, writer, lecturer and consultant to Israeli and US legislators and their staffers. He is an expert on US-Israel relations, Middle East affairs and Jewish-Arab demography. Ettinger is a co-founder of the America-Israel Demographic Research Group (AIDRG), which has documented a 2 million gap in the number of Arabs in Judea & Samaria and Gaza.

Ettinger has claimed that the number of Palestinian Arabs living to the west of the Jordan River (in the West Bank, Israel, and the Gaza Strip) is only 4.8 million, rather than the 6.2 million derived from official Israeli figures. His demographic forecasts are widely cited by Israeli right-wing politicians in support of annexation of the West Bank, because the left argues that annexation would put an end to Jews being in the majority in Israel. But his figures are disputed by professional demographers.

== Biography ==
Yoram Ettinger was born in Tel Aviv, Israel. He holds a B.A. in Business Administration from The University of Texas at El Paso (UTEP), an M.S. in International Management from The University of California, Los Angeles (UCLA) and a CPA certificate from the American Institute of Certified Public Accountants (AICPA).

In 1985–88, Ettinger served as Israel's consul-general in Texas, and subsequently headed Israel's Government Press Office. In 1989–92, he worked at the Israeli embassy in the United States as the diplomat responsible for relations with the US Congress. He held the rank of ambassador.

Ettinger resides in Jerusalem and is married to Ora. Together they have three daughters.

== Assessment ==
According to Dennis Ross and Michael Makovsky, "It is Ettinger who is the intellectual and political spearhead of the efforts to counter the demographic threat narrative…. The Jewish State is not facing a potential Arab demographic time bomb….". According to The Middle East Journal, "Ettinger's efforts had a major impact on the debate over the implications of demography for the peace process….". According to Prof. Itamar Rabinovich, who was Israel's Chief Negotiator with Syria, Ettinger had a role in preventing an Israeli withdrawal from the Golan Heights.

Israeli demographer Sergio DellaPergola stated that discrepancies in the Palestinian population are "relatively negligible compared to what Ettinger says" and that Ettinger is "delusional" for ignoring the higher growth rate of the Palestinians compared to Israeli Jews. According to DellaPergola, Ettinger is "peddling some imaginary future in an utterly unprofessional way, because he never took a course in demographics." Arnon Soffer, a demography expert at Haifa University, stated that Ettinger and others on the "extreme right" "invent things to enable the annexation of the territories". According to Soffer, the reason why the West Bank has not been annexed is that right-wing Israeli politicians such as Benjamin Netanyahu know that Ettinger's figures are not accurate.

== Works ==
- 1620-2020: 400th Anniversary of the US-Israel Kinship.
- Jewish Holidays Guide for the Perplexed.
