= Shell Answer Man =

Fictional spokescharacter

- Agency: Ogilvy & Mather
- Client: Royal Dutch Shell
- Language: English
- Media: Television
- Product: Vehicle maintenance
- Release date: 1960s
- Slogan: Come to Shell for answers
- Starring: Don Morrow; Vince O'Brien; Richard Anderson

The Shell Answer Man was a series of television advertisements from the 1960s through the 1990s sponsored by Royal Dutch Shell in which answers were provided to common questions from the public about driving, with advice on vehicle maintenance, repair and safety, as well as guidance to users of home heating oil. Companion booklets, a series titled the Shell Answer Books, were inserted into major magazines and distributed as free giveaways at Shell gas stations. The ads were aimed at typical drivers, helping inform them how to avoid wasting gasoline through such tips as not making jackrabbit starts, ensuring proper tire inflation, regular oil changes and proper basic maintenance of their vehicle, as well as guidance on how to get the most out of heating one's home.

The campaign was developed in the late 1960s for Shell by the advertising firm of Ogilvy & Mather, a relationship that would continue for nearly four decades. Print ads addressed other oil uses, such as touting the benefits of switching to an oil-powered hot water heater and reminding those using oil to heat their homes to make sure that they have enough oil in their tank before cold weather arrives. In November 1999, Ogilvy & Mather announced that it would close its office in Houston, Texas, which had largely dedicated to the Shell account; when O&M closed the office in Houston it dropped other local accounts that it could no longer justify supporting.

Actor and announcer Don Morrow appeared in the campaign in the 1960s, offering tips to drivers. Actor Vince O'Brien landed the role of the Shell Answer Man in the late 1960s and 1970s, an opportunity he described in a newspaper interview as being "like hitting the state lottery." O'Brien's balding, mature appearance made him an effective authority figure in the campaign. Actor Richard Anderson played the role of the Shell Answer Man from 1976 to 1982.
