= Ettinger (British company) =

British leather goods company

G. Ettinger Limited
- Type: Private limited company
- Industry: Leather goods
- Founded: 1934; 92 years ago
- Founder: Gerard Ettinger
- Headquarters: London, England
- Owner: Ettinger family
- Website: ettingerlondon.com

A leather card case by Ettinger

Ettinger is a British leather goods company founded in 1934 by Gerard Ettinger. The company specializes in handcrafted wallets, bags, and leather accessories. Based in London, Ettinger holds a royal warrant of appointment as Manufacturers of Leathergoods to HM The King. The company remains family-owned and is currently run by Robert Ettinger, Gerard's elder son.

== History ==
Ettinger was founded in 1934 by Gerard Ettinger. The company initially supplied leather goods to major department stores, including Harrods, Fortnum & Mason, and Asprey.

Robert took over leadership in 1990. The company received a royal warrant to the Prince of Wales in 1996. In 1999, Ettinger acquired James Homer Ltd, which was established in 1890, along with its entire workforce.

In 2010, the company opened its first retail outlet. In 2013, Ettinger opened its first stand-alone shop in Tokyo.

== Company overview ==
Ettinger is headquartered in London, with its factory located in Walsall, northwest of Birmingham. The company operates a showroom in Putney.

Exports account for the majority of Ettinger's sales, with 70 percent of revenue coming from foreign markets. The company sells to customers in over 210 countries and exports 90 percent of production to the US, Japan, Korea, China and Europe.
