= Gerard Ettinger =

Founder, G Ettinger Limited

Gerard Ettinger (29 December 1909 – 30 June 2002) was the founder of the British designer and manufacturer of luxury leather goods G Ettinger Ltd, as well as a German film producer.

Born on 29 December 1909 in Posen, Prussia (now Poland), the son of a military outfitter whose customers included the eldest son of the Kaiser and Hindenburg, Ettinger moved to Berlin with his family after the First World War. He moved to Rome at the age of 18, then later returned to Germany, where he worked for a film company. After he was dismissed in 1933 for being Jewish, he went to first Paris, then London to compile a book profiling Europe's leading actors. In London he gained employment as an agent for German factories exporting leather and luxury goods to the UK. He set up the business that would become G Ettinger in 1934.

Ettinger was briefly interned at the start of the Second World War, then worked as a radio broadcaster and translator. After the war's end he was part of a film-making team that worked to rebuild the German film industry—the team made films and rebuilt hundreds of German cinemas. On his return to London he was commissioned by Asprey to procure luxury leather goods, which were then scarce. Ettinger goods were made in London and Walsall, and imported from continental Europe. By the 1970s most of the firm's output was produced under contract for branded retailers such as Harrods. Ettinger continued to work until he was 91; he died at the age of 92 on 30 June 2002.
