= Max Ettinger =

Austrian-German-Swiss composer and conductor

Max Ettinger (27 December 1874 – 19 July 1951) was an Austrian-German-Swiss composer and conductor.

== Life ==
Born in Lemberg, Ettinger was the grandson of the Chief Rabbi of Lemberg and the son of the landowner Herz Ettinger. His mother, Ernestine Landau, gave him his first musical education. He was taught by tutors on his parents' estate and took his school-leaving examination at the old German-Polish grammar school in Lemberg. In Berlin, he tried to get accepted at the Hochschule für Musik, but was not admitted. He received private lessons there in 1899 from Heinrich von Herzogenberg and Heinrich van Eyken in harmony and composition. From 1900 to 1903, he studied at the Hochschule für Musik und Theater München with Josef Gabriel Rheinberger, Viktor Gluth and Ludwig Thuille, with the latter privately until 1905. In 1906, he worked as a bandmaster in Saarbrücken and in 1910 in Lübeck, but he gave up this job because of health reasons. From 1911, he lived again in Munich as a composer, where he married Josephine Krisack in 1913.

In the 1920s, Ettinger was very successful as a composer, his literary operas were performed in Nuremberg, Hamburg, Munich, Kiel and Leipzig. He also worked again as a conductor in Leipzig (1920–1929) and Berlin (1929–1933). In 1933, he emigrated to Switzerland with Austrian nationality because of his birth in Lemberg and settled in Ascona, where he already owned a house. With the Anschluss, he became a German citizen, but his German citizenship was revoked when Jewish emigrants were deported. He lost his house through a bank bankruptcy and received support from the Swiss Israelite poor relief organisation. Ettinger created orchestral works and chamber music, as well as music for cultural films. Ettinger died in Basel in July 1951 at the age of 76 and was buried in Zurich. His wife died a few days after his death.

Ettinger's estate is today in the library of the Israelitische Cultusgemeinde Zürich.

== Work ==
- Rialon Pantomime op. 11, Munich, 1911
- Judith (Libretto: Max Ettinger after Hebbel's Judith), musical tragedy in 3 acts op. 28. (1920/1921 Nürnberg)
- Der eifersüchtige Trinker (Libretto: Friedrich Freksa after Boccacio's Decamerone), Musical tragicomedy in 1 act, op. 14. (1925 Nürnberg)
- Juana. Opera in one Aufzug op. 33. Poem by Georg Kaiser, (1925 Nürnberg)
- Clavigo. Opera in two Aufzügen op. 34 (six scenes). Poetry by Max Ettinger after Goethe's Clavigo. (1926 Leipzig)
- Frühlings Erwachen (Libretto: Max Ettinger after Frank Wedekind's Frühlings Erwachen), Opera in 3 acts op. 36. (1928 Leipzig)
- Dolores (Libretto: Max Ettinger after Émile Zola), opera in 3 acts op. 40 (1930/31; 1936 Viena)
- Das Lied von Moses. Oratorio (1939). First performed on 10 December 1939 in the Gemeindehaus of the Israelitische Cultusgemeinde Zurich under the direction of Alexander Schaichet with a mixed choir (composed of the "Hasomir" and "Jewish Ladies' Choir") and the strengthened Zurich Chamber Orchestra.
- Der Dybuk, Ballet (1946/47)
- Jiddisch Requiem with texts by Lajzer Ajchenrand and Chaim Nachman Bialik. First performed in 1948 (at the Tonhalle Zurich by the choir "Hasomir" conducted by Alexander Schaichet).
