= Churchill Ettinger =

American painter

- Born: May 10, 1903; Haworth, New Jersey, United States
- Died: March 4, 1984 (aged 80); Weston, Vermont, United States
- Occupation: Painter

Churchill Ettinger (May 10, 1903 – March 4, 1984) was an American painter. His work was part of the painting event in the art competition at the 1936 Summer Olympics.

Churchill Ettinger started his career as a portrait artist for the New York Sunday World where he painted notables of the day. One of them was the great George Gershwin who played his "Rhapsody in Blue" for the young artist as he sketched. After a career as illustrator, Mr. Ettinger joined Standard Magazines in 1942 as their art director and stayed until 1952 when he relocated home and studio to Vermont to become a full-time painter.

During his time as a full-time painter, Ettinger alternated between watercolor and oils, mostly using oil colors for portraits.

His work is in many private and public collections.
