= Myrtle Vail =

American actress and writer (1888–1978)

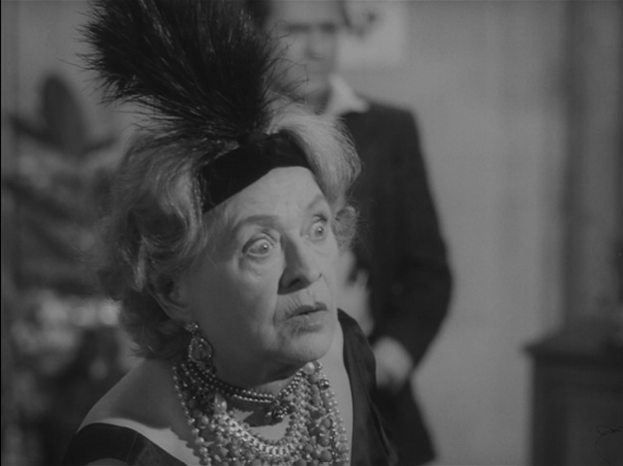
- Vail in The Little Shop of Horrors (1960)
- Born: January 7, 1888; Joliet, Illinois, U.S.
- Died: September 18, 1978 (aged 90); Kansas City, Missouri, U.S.
- Other name: Myrtle Damerel
- Occupations: Actress, writer
- Years active: 1903–1964
- Spouse(s): George Damerel (m. 19??; died 1936)
- Children: 2, including Donna Damerel
- Relatives: Charles B. Griffith (grandson)

Myrtle Vail (January 7, 1888 – September 18, 1978), sometimes credited as Myrtle Damerel, was an American vaudevillian, and radio and film actress and writer. She was a radio fixture from 1932 to 1946 thanks to the popular soap opera Myrt and Marge, playing the elder half of the title as well as having created and written the show.

== Early life ==
Vail's father, Fred Vail, was a painter and decorator in Joliet, Illinois. When she was 15, she left her home to become an entertainer. After she married and had two children, the family had its own act, traveling from one locality to another to perform during the 1910s and 1920s. When their investments were lost in the 1929 economic crash, she turned her attention to radio.

== Career ==
=== Radio show ===
Vail thought of the show while living in the Chicago area, after having spent several years as a vaudeville performer (often with her husband, George Damerel), basing it largely on her own experiences. She cast herself as Myrtle and her real-life daughter, Donna Damerel Fick, as Marge. Myrt was the elder, experienced chorus girl taking the young, inexperienced, and innocent Marge under her wing. The sponsor, Wrigley liked the idea and Myrt and Marge debuted in 1932. In 1933, Vail was injured seriously in an automobile accident. This forced her to turn the show's writing over to a colleague named Charles Thomas, who wrote a storyline in which Myrt was kidnapped by gangsters, allowing Vail to recuperate completely.

When Myrt and Marge ended in 1942, Vail came up with Myrt, Ltd., but the program was unsuccessful. She made one last effort with the original concept in 1946, creating a transcribed version of Myrt and Marge that used refurbished scripts. It found little success.

=== After radio ===
After the show ended, Vail became a low-key supporting actress in films, best known for roles in the low-budget cult films A Bucket of Blood (1959) and The Little Shop of Horrors (1960), written by her grandson Charles B. Griffith, and directed by Roger Corman, for whom Griffith had written and/or directed several films.

Vail apparently never remarried after her husband's death in 1936.

She appeared on television's This Is Your Life in 1960.

She can be heard in her radio career today because of the survival of approximately fifty episodes of Myrt and Marge.

== Death ==
A longtime resident of Haworth, New Jersey, Vail died in Kansas City, Missouri in 1978, aged 90.

== Personal life ==
Vail filed suit for divorce from Damerel in March 1934, saying that they had been living apart since May 1932.

Vail also had a son, George Damerel, who acted on radio, as well as two grandsons, one of whom was director and screenwriter Charles B. Griffith.
