= Myrt and Marge (radio series) =

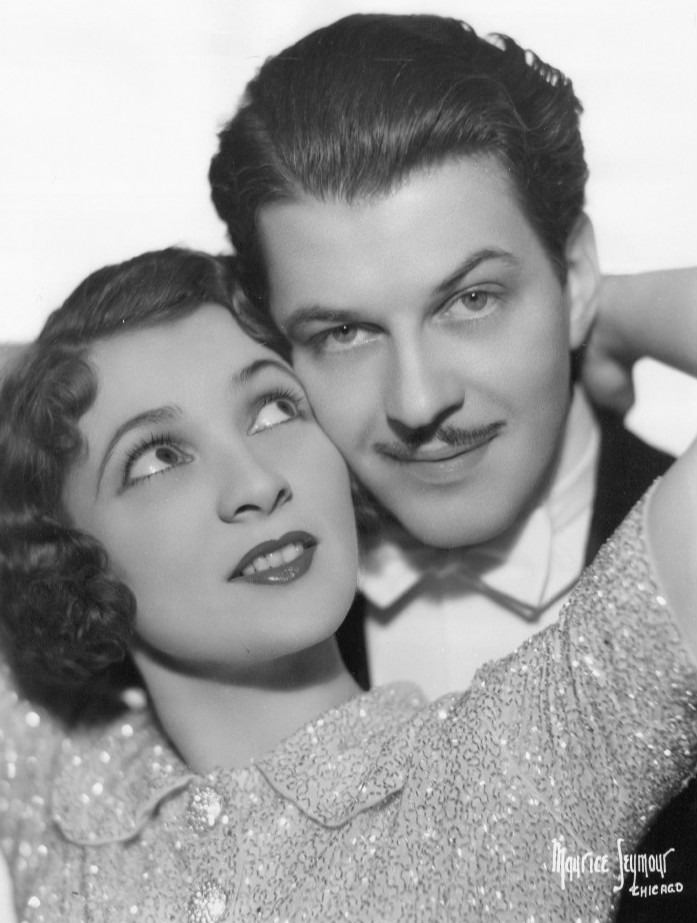
- Donna Damerel (Marge Minter) with actor Vinton Hayworth (Jack Arnold), 1935
- Genre: Daily serial
- Running time: 15 minutes
- Country of origin: USA
- Language: English
- Syndicates: CBS Radio; Don Lee Network
- Starring: Myrtle Vail; Donna Damerel (1932-1941; her death); Helen Mack (1941-42; 1946)
- Created by: Myrtle Vail
- Written by: Myrtle Vail
- Recording studio: Chicago
- Original release: November 2, 1931 (night); January 4, 1937 (daytime) – 1946
- Sponsored by: Wrigley, Colgate-Palmolive

Myrt and Marge is an American radio serial which aired from November 2, 1931, to March 27, 1942, on CBS Radio and the Mutual Broadcasting System. It was created and written by its main star, actress Myrtle Vail.

== Characters and story ==
The soap tracked the doings and undoings of the two close friends, Myrtle Spear (Myrtle Vail) and Marge Minter (Donna Damerel, later Helen Mack) with some of the usual soap opera twists (kidnappings, organized crime, murder) and injected a degree of comedy into a genre not usually known at the time for wit.

== Development and production ==
Myrtle Vail thought of the idea while living in the Chicago area, after having spent several years as a vaudeville performer (often with her husband, George Damerel), basing it almost entirely on her own vaudeville experiences. She took the idea to the Wrigley chewing gum makers, who had yet to sponsor a radio show, naming her lead characters Myrtle Spear and Marge Minter (playing on the company's best-known gum), while casting herself as Myrtle and her real-life daughter Donna Damerel as Marge, with Myrt being the elder, experienced chorus girl taking young, inexperienced, and innocent Marge under her wing. (In the pilot, Marge was said to be Myrt's daughter.) Wrigley liked the idea and Myrt & Marge debuted in late 1931.

Originally a prime-time entry, the show proved so popular with women that it was moved to daytime programming. The cast was described in a 1931 trade publication article as being "one of the largest casts in radio. Thirty actors and musicians take part in most of the presentations, and no member of the cast plays a double role." In later years the show was sponsored by Colgate-Palmolive-Peet, who promoted its Super Suds laundry soap among other products on the show.

In 1933, Vail was seriously injured in an automobile accident, forcing her to turn the show's writing over to a colleague named Charles Thomas. Thomas wrote a storyline in which Myrt was kidnapped by gangsters, allowing Vail to recuperate completely. Donna Damerel died on February 15, 1941, aged 28, while giving birth to her third son. She had done a Myrt & Marge performance hours before going into labor.

Vail was quoted (by Movie-Radio Guide) as saying she believed her daughter would not have wanted the show to die. She wrote Damerel's character out of the script for the interim, with the character of Marge hiding in the hills until a murder could be resolved, and set about casting a new Marge. The role finally went to film actress Helen Mack, who was chosen from more than 200 applicants for the role. After just a few months with Mack playing the role, Myrt & Marge ended in 1942.

Vail attempted to revive the show in 1946, in a syndicated version starring Vail and Mack, which sometimes included updated re-writes of the original scripts, according to radio historian John Dunning. However, the new show was a short-lived ratings failure, and the one-time favorite disappeared quietly in 1947. Approximately 110 episodes of Myrt & Marge survive, most from the 1946-47 syndication revival. Three — including the show's pilot episode — from its 1930s heyday are known to survive as well.

== Adaptations ==
A film released by Universal Studios in 1933, starring Vail and her daughter, Donna Damerel, turned the show into a feature film vehicle for the Three Stooges, as well as their former front man Ted Healy. In the film, Myrt Spear's touring vaudeville revue is full of talent and bound for Broadway, but low on funds. Conniving and lecherous producer Mr. Jackson (played by actor Thomas E. Jackson) helps the show so he can romance the young star, Marge Minter. Myrt, and Marge's boyfriend Eddie Hanley (Eddie Foy Jr.), step in to save the revue and Marge. Ted Healy, Moe, Larry and Curly are stagehands with hopes to join the show, and deal with the antics of backstage crasher Bonnie Bonnell.
