= When Women Kill =

1983 documentary film

- Directed by: Lee Grant
- Produced by: Joseph Feury; Milton Justice; Mary Beth Yarrow
- Narrated by: Lee Grant
- Cinematography: Hart Perry
- Edited by: Geri Ashur
- Distributed by: HBO; Hope Runs High
- Release date: September 6, 1983
- Running time: 57 minutes
- Country: United States
- Language: English

When Women Kill is a 1983 documentary film directed by Academy Award winner Lee Grant. The film explores life inside several women's prisons across the United States and the circumstances that led to the incarceration of a variety of inmates. Originally aired on HBO, the film is notable for its sympathetic, if level headed treatment of its characters. The film features women incarcerated for crimes ranging from drug use to first degree murder. A portion of the film follows Manson Family member Leslie Van Houten. Grant has spoken at length about the Manson family and the murder of her Valley of the Dolls co-star Sharon Tate.

== Development ==
When Women Kill was produced under Grant and husband/producer Joseph Feury's production deal with HBO. Initially Grant was interested in what led women to commit violent crimes. Grant's crew gained entrance to several women's prisons across the country and filming took place over many months. Harlan County USA director Barbara Kopple was the sound recordist.

== Reception ==
The film received mixed-to-positive reviews. The New York Times felt that though at moments the film had trouble balancing the morality of its subjects, "The truth is that the criminal-justice system is unsure itself about what to do about these women. In making its argument, the documentary indicates that no one is ever rehabilitated in prison and that the women don't need rehabilitation, anyway."

== Legacy ==
The film is part of Grant's documentary collection and is expected to receive a digital and limited repertory cinema re-release in the Winter of 2019-2020 along with the majority of her non-fiction work.
