= Broadway Brawler =

1997 unfinished American film

- Directed by: Lee Grant; Dennis Dugan
- Written by: Juliet Aires; Keith Giglio
- Produced by: Bruce Willis; Joseph Feury
- Starring: Bruce Willis; Maura Tierney
- Cinematography: William A. Fraker
- Production company: Cinergi Pictures
- Distributed by: Buena Vista Pictures Distribution
- Release date: 1997 (intended)
- Country: United States
- Language: English
- Budget: $28 million

Broadway Brawler is an unfinished romantic comedy film that was to star Bruce Willis and Maura Tierney and be directed by Lee Grant. It was produced by Willis and Joseph Feury for Cinergi Pictures, and was to have been distributed by Buena Vista Pictures Distribution in 1997.

Other cast members included Daniel Baldwin (as "Matt"), Alex Boyd (as a flashback, younger version of "Matt"), Jenifer Lewis, and Casey Moses Wurzbach, though it is unclear how much, if any, of their scenes were shot at the time the production folded.

The film was to be entirely shot in Feury's hometown of Wilmington, Delaware. Twenty days into principal photography, Willis, unhappy with the work of some of the crew, fired multiple people, leading Disney to shut down production. Instead of suing him, the studio reached a deal with Willis to work on three films for a discounted rate; Armageddon (1998), The Sixth Sense (1999), and The Kid (2000).

== Premise ==
Eddie Kapinsky (Bruce Willis), a has-been retired professional ice hockey player, starts up a relationship with a character played by Maura Tierney. The film was ostensibly to have been a sporty comedy in the same vein as the previous year's Jerry Maguire.

== Production ==
After approximately two years of pre-production as well as 20 days of principal photography, the production was halted owing to the acrimonious environment on set. Willis was dissatisfied with the performance of multiple members of the crew, including cinematographer William A. Fraker, wardrobe designer Carol Oditz, director Lee Grant, and Willis's co-producer (and Grant's husband) Joe Feury, all of whom were terminated along with several other members of cast and crew.

As more than half of the film's $28 million budget had already been spent, Willis brought on director Dennis Dugan to try to carry on. However production folded before Dugan would be able to shoot any scenes. The agents of the other actors publicly expressed a belief that these actors would be paid in full, regardless of the folding of production; they later were reported to have reached an amicable settlement.

It is extremely unusual for such a large-budget production to simply end without a finished product.

== Aftermath ==
The implosion of the production was largely attributed to Willis's actions and behavior, leaving him in a difficult position with The Walt Disney Company, Cinergi's parent company for whom the film was being shot. Willis was facing a $17.5 million lawsuit. To offset this loss to the company, William Morris Agency president Arnold Rifkin brokered a deal for their client with Disney producer Joe Roth, who convinced Willis to take a three-picture deal with Disney, at a greatly reduced salary, which Willis agreed to. The first film of this agreement was Armageddon, for which Willis received $3 million, a significant pay cut from his normal asking price of $20 million. The difference would cover the money lost on Broadway Brawler.

After this, Willis starred in The Sixth Sense and Disney's The Kid, thus closing out the remainder of the deal. These three movies together grossed $1.3 billion worldwide.
