= Women on Trial =

Women on Trial may refer to:

- Women on Trial (1992 film), a documentary film directed by Lee Grant,
- Women on Trial (2026 film), also known as L'Affaire Marie-Claire, a drama film directed by Lauriane Escaffre and Yvo Muller.
