= Battered (film) =

- Directed by: Lee Grant
- Produced by: Joseph Feury
- Narrated by: Lee Grant
- Distributed by: HBO
- Release date: September 12, 1989
- Running time: 57 minutes
- Country: United States
- Language: English

Battered is a 1989 documentary film directed by Academy Award winner Lee Grant. The film is an investigation of domestic violence in American homes. Originally aired on HBO, the film is notable for its level headed look at abusers as well as victims.

== Development ==
Battered was produced under Grant and husband/producer Joseph Feury's production deal with HBO. Grant felt that domestic violence was an issue that would be deeply felt by all women, victims or not. Filming took place across the United States and over many months.

== Reception ==
The film received positive reviews. The Los Angeles Times stated "a tendency to go heavy on statistics somewhat mars an otherwise excellent show. Often raw and blunt, "Battered" is not pretty TV. But it does make its points and is a strong addition to the swelling chorus calling for reform of an unresponsive system." People magazine remarked that "Lee Grant has always been one heck of an actress; Battered confirms that she is one heck of a filmmaker too."

== Legacy ==
The film is part of Grant's documentary collection and is expected to receive a digital and limited repertory cinema re-release in the winter of 2019-2020 along with the majority of her non-fiction work. It has become a frequent teaching tool in university criminology courses. In 2017 Grant co-directed a short YouTube video with Taylor A. Purdee entitled Battered: The Assault on Hillary Clinton. Grant felt that the short video was a continuation on the theme of "battering", through the lens of Hillary Clinton's mistreatment at the hands of male political opponents over the course of the 2016 presidential election. Pieces of this short were shown at the inaugural Split Screens TV Festival, where Grant was receiving a lifetime achievement award .
