= Monte Merrick =

American screenwriter (1949–2015)

- Born: October 6, 1949; Portland, Oregon
- Died: March 24, 2015 (aged 65); Santa Monica, California
- Education: Lewis & Clark College, University of Colorado Boulder
- Occupation: Writer
- Writing career
- Notable works: Memphis Belle, A Hell of a Town

Monte L. Merrick (October 6, 1949 - March 24, 2015) was a screenwriter, playwright and novelist most notable for his long career in theatre and his feature film screenplays, including 1990's Memphis Belle.

"My plays are always rooted in reality with real characters because that's what I'm interested in," Merrick told the Rochester Democrat and Chronicle in 1984. "It's not social issues. It's human values and human relationships."

== Early life ==
Born in Portland, Oregon to Arthur P. and Pearl Merrick, he was one of five children. He attended Lewis & Clark College in Portland and later earned a master's degree in theatre from the University of Colorado Boulder.

== Career ==
=== 1973-1982: Early Success in Theatre ===
Merrick originally intended to be an actor, performing in college and community theatre productions such as Hail Scrawdyke, Two Gentlemen of Verona and You're a Good Man, Charlie Brown. He changed directions when his senior thesis at Lewis & Clark College resulted in Little Pieces, a show of three one-act plays, premiering in March 1971, with Markie Post and Timothy Cole. The show was produced again in 1973. The script won Merrick a Shubert Fellowship to study playwriting at the University of Colorado.

In 1974, Falling Apart was workshopped at the tenth annual National Playwrights Conference at the O'Neill Center in Waterford, Connecticut. The two-act play dramatized the tumultuous 1960s and the events therein, when six friends gathered on New Year's Eve in 1970 to reflect upon the previous decade. Merrick, 24 at the time, told The Day of New London Connecticut that he was utilizing his time at the conference to connect with professional theatre artists. The play was produced later that year by Merrick's fellow students at University of Colorado, Boulder, directed by future Lexington Conservatory member Wendy Chapin. Falling Apart was subsequently produced at the Cubiculo Theatre in New York City, directed by John Henry Davis and starring James Alexander, Jo Anne Belanger, Mark Blankfield and Brandis Kemp and Tina Sattin. "Merrick evidently has nothing to say about his rich subject matter," according to one critic. "Falling Apart is just about the easiest play to write," said critic Mel Gussow, "a collage of events in recent history, interposed with small scenes in everyday life. But easy can be hard if you don't know what you're doing and why you're doing it." Despite mixed reviews in New York, Falling Apart was produced numerous times and with more favorable reviews, including at the Slabtown Stop Theatre in Portland, Oregon in 1975, directed by and co-starring the author. The Portland cast included Bill Deane, Jacqueline Fowler, Sherrideth Iron, Chrisse Roccaro and Richard Storm. "The play is filled with laughter, but with a great deal of thought-provoking material...In a few words, it is a fine evening of theater,"- The Oregon Journal. The New Theatre in Sydney, Australia produced the play in 1976, directed by Brian Syron.

By 1975, Merrick had earned his master's degree in theatre and was working as a substitute teacher while living in Portland, where he acted in local productions as his plays were being produced in the area. Interviewed that January, he told The Oregonian that he "writes comedies because they are easier" but noted that "Even my comedies have serious intent. "My serious plays always have comedy in them, though it's often some pretty black comedy."

Children, the story of three girls, one of whom collects a scrapbook of obituaries, was performed by the Portland State University Players in February 1975. In March, Big City won the Charles MacArthur Playwriting Award. It was produced at Florida State University that June, directed by Mark Berman. It starred Matthew Cutugno, Caris Corfman, Winnie Boone and Gene Densmore. Big City also won the Huidekoper Playwriting Award from Webster College in St. Louis. Also in June was the production of Merrick's Hidden Motives as part of a double bill with Tom Stoppard's The Real Inspector Hound at Portland Civic Theatre. The Portland Civic board awarded Merrick the Julius Zell Perpetual Trophy, a prestigious award for local playwrights, for his writing of Hidden Motives. The play, a spoof on Agatha Christie mysteries, ran June 5–29 and was well received. "..a funny skitlike parody of whodunits consisting almost entirely of accusations by a stuffy sleuth nicely done by Michael Hopkins," said critic Ted Mahar.

In 1977, Merrick won the second annual Jane L. Gilmore Playwriting Contest for The Man Upstairs. The prize included $1,000 in cash, and a $1,000 fee for a residency in Omaha during a full production of the play. It was produced at Omaha Community Playhouse in March of that year, directed by Chris Rutherford and starring Joanne Pettipiece, Karen Draper and Susan Hoff. The Omaha World-Herald described the production as too long but appreciated Merrick's talent for comedy and one-liners. "A bittersweet comedy...a sort of wacky compendium of 'The Glass Menagerie', Tom Stoppard and 'Mary Hartman'".

In 1978, after a year of living in Los Angeles, Merrick moved to New York. He became associated with Lexington Conservatory Theatre in Lexington, NY. In 1978, the company produced the world premiere of his play Nurseryland starring Court Miller and directed by Peggy Scott. "A satiric but honest portrait of the American school," as Merrick described it to the Stamford Mirror Recorder. "Lexington Conservatory Theatre provides the perfect atmosphere for developing a new play." Merrick drew upon his experience as a substitute teacher to render a dark comedy about a group of teachers rebelling against their school administration. "Profound and humorous," according to critic Dan DiNicola. In December 1979, director William Rippner put out a casting call for a re-titled version of the play called The Teacher's Smoking Room, to be produced at Tyson Studios in New York City.

In 1980, the Lexington company presented a workshop of his play Saturday Night Special, directed by Mary Baird. The play was subsequently produced at Direct Theatre in New York City, with Peggy Scott directing. The cast included Mary Baird, Lilene Mansell, J.R. Horne, John Robert Tillotson and Wesley John Rice, some of whom reprised their roles from the Lexington workshop.

In 1981, A Pair of Hearts opened at Manhattan Punch Line Theatre, starring Leslie Frances Williams, Nancy Linehan Charles, Mitch McGuire and Mary Baird, directed by Steve Kaplan. "Monte Merrick has written a slick, sentimental, wryly amusing, predictable comedy about the ups and downs of two marriages as viewed over a weekend in Holiday Inn motel rooms in Seattle, San Francisco and Reno," according to the New York Daily News. The play had its west coast premiere in 1983, at the Lake Oswego Community Theatre, directed by Jerry Leith with a cast that included Carolyn Tomei, John Kobasic and Dee Dee Van Zyl. "The play is lighter than light, but Merrick keeps a steady supply of Neil Simon-like one-liners and asides flowing,"—Ted Mahar, The Oregonian.

That same year, Starry Night premiered with a staged reading at Lincoln Center, starring Jill Eikenberry, Toby Parker and Allan Carlsen, directed by John Henry Davis. The play tells the story of a triangular relationship between a husband, his brother and his wife, disrupted by the impending birth of a child. Subsequent productions included Alley Theatre in Houston in 1985, Stage West in Fort Worth in 1987, Florida Studio Theatre in Sarasota and the Colony Theatre in Los Angeles. It also received a staged reading in June 1986, as part of the inaugural season of Stages, a new play development project of the Philadelphia Theatre Company.

=== 1982-1988: A Hell of a Town ===
A Hell of a Town was slated to premiere in 1982 at the Ritz Theatre, starring comedy team John Monteith and Suzanne Rand in their dramatic debut; it was ultimately cancelled due to lack of funding. The play was written for the two specifically.

Interviewed in 1983, Merrick lamented the collapse of funding for the production, and hoped to eventually have a hit show. Despite seven productions of Falling Apart and numerous productions of his other plays, he made a living as a "word processor," typing documents for a law firm on Wall Street, while looking forward to his next project. "Generally, it takes about two months to do a rough draft, and then I give it to people, give it to theaters, and if all goes well, there will be a reading of the play. I'll make changes in this process, but usually not too many...after a while I just decide it's finished," he explained. "I'd rather go on to something new than keep rewriting."

Merrick's career took a turn a few months later, when Geva Theatre Center in Rochester, NY took up production of A Hell of a Town as part of its season. The show premiered in January 1984 with Joanna Gleason and John Monteith, directed by Allan Carlsen. "From the first scene when one of the two characters asks, "Is it working for you?" A Hell of a Town, the brand-new comedy at GeVa, works and works and works well," said the Rochester Democrat and Chronicle. "It works on your funny bone and some other places of your anatomy and most importantly, your head." It played a successful two-month run there, selling out each of its 35 performances with a total attendance of 8,050, and was set to transfer to New York. At that point, it was the only Geva production to do so.

After the play wrapped, Monteith and Gleason told the Rochester Democrat and Chronicle that they had a week off before rehearsing for the Off-Broadway run, but when the show opened at the Westside Theatre, Joanna Gleason appeared alongside Peter Riegert instead of Monteith, who had "other commitments" according to the producer. Producer Frank Gero heard about the Rochester production from a friend and drove up to see it. Two weeks later, he announced that the show would open for previews on March 6 at the Westside. "The play begins with a blackout scene," Gero told the Daily News. "I started laughing and I didn't stop until 10 of 10, when the curtain came down. By 10:15 I had an option on the play." "Mr. Merrick can write funny lines and is a crafty observer of the ups and downs of an acquisitive society," said the New York Times review, while The Home News enjoyed the production's components but objected to the trilogic structure. Newsday praised the "crisp" direction and deft performances, but criticized the darkly comic subject matter. Robert Feldberg in The Record said "It starts out fine, but collapses well before the finish." After 32 performances, A Hell of a Town closed. "The closing was one of the saddest chapters in my life," said producer Frank Gero, who observed that two weeks of sold-out previews were followed by dismal sales after the play's critical reception in the New York press. The Off-Broadway production lost $125,000.

The play was produced again in 1988 at the 26th Street Theatre in Wilton Manors, Florida, starring a young Marc Kudisch alongside Andrea O'Connell, directed by Brian C. Smith. "It's a lot of fun, I can tell you that right off the bat," Kudisch told the Sun Sentinel. "This is a crazy play." Kudisch earned points toward his Equity card while performing in this show, his professional debut. "Monte Merrick attempts the flip manner of playwright Murray Schisgal in some respects but lacks Schisgal's ability to make consistently good sport of urban Angst or yuppie hang-ups," said critic Jack Zink. "People who value things like reality should avoid A Hell of a Town," quipped The Miami Herald.

Merrick's next play Pride and Joy was workshopped at Sundance Institute in 1985, where it was directed by Len Berkman with actors Margo Martindale, Didi Conn, Ethan Phillips and fellow Lexington alumni Cotter Smith. It was produced at Theatre 40 in Beverly Hills in 1987, starring Krisann Keane, Will Nye, Viveca Parker and J. David Krassner, directed by John Henry Davis. A "dark and funny satire," according to critic Pam Linn, with "a near-perfect cast."

=== 1989-2014: Screenwriting Success and Return to Playwriting ===
In 1987, production began on Merrick's first screenplay credit. Originally titled Boy's Life, the feature film was directed by Lee Grant and featured a cast that included Sean Astin, Stockard Channing and Dermot Mulroney. It was released as Staying Together in 1989, to positive reviews but underwhelming ticket sales.

The following year, producer David Puttnam chose Merrick as the screenwriter for 1990's Memphis Belle, on the strength of a previous script. Puttnam appreciated that Merrick had successfully rendered an ensemble of characters with their own identities. The film was successful and garnered mostly positive reviews, though some critics noted that it was not strictly historically accurate. Merrick wrote a novelization of the script, published by Penguin Books the same year.

In 1993, Merrick's first original novel Shelter was published by Hyperion .

1997 saw the debut of Merrick's adaptation of Charles Dickens' Oliver Twist, starring Richard Dreyfus as Fagin (in a rare TV role) and Elijah Wood as Artful Dodger, directed by Tony Bill. Intended as a feature film under executive producer Laurence Mark, the production stalled and subsequently was picked up by Disney to be part of the 1997 relaunch of The Wonderful World of Disney. The broadcast was well received by critics. The Seattle Post-Intelligencer praised the writing as "intelligent and not the least bit condescending".

In 2004, Merrick returned to theatre with Cat Feet, the story of a female poet grappling with Alzheimer's. A reading in New York featured Barbara Barrie, Christine Ebersole, Martha Plimpton and Bobby Cannavale, while in Los Angeles a reading starred Cloris Leachman and Mel Harris. The Northlight Theatre in Chicago produced the world premiere in October 2004. ""Cat Feet" is like the fog of the Carl Sandburg poem referenced in Merrick's title. It comes, it goes. A few laughs, a moist dab of pathos or two, and it's 10:08 and you're back in the car," according to the Chicago Tribune.

The Boy Who Saw Baby Doll received a reading at the 45th Street Theatre in NYC in January 2007, starring Joanna Gleason and Chris Sarandon, while Need was read at the Dramatists Guild in New York, directed by John Henry Davis.

First Casualty premiered at The Hormel New Works Festival at the Phoenix Theatre, Phoenix, Arizona, in July 2012. The staged reading was directed by William Partlan. Its cast included Paul Duran, Angelica Howland and Marshall Glass. "Despite its serious subject matter, "First Casualty" is authentically funny. And it's perfectly paced thanks to Partlan's exquisite use of silence and pause," said writer Lynn Trimble. "One of my biggest influences in writing was Neil Simon," Merrick said in an interview during the rehearsal period. "Although this is far from a Neil Simon play, I always infuse any dramatic situation with humor. Because that's life."

A reading of Open Heart inaugurated the Sedona New Play Festival at the Canyon Moon Theatre in Sedona, Arizona in 2013.

Merrick's final theatre work was a workshop of Rain! the Musical, with a book by Merrick and music and lyrics by college friend Richard Moore. It premiered at Portland's Fertile Ground Festival in February 2013, directed by Louanne Moldovan.

In 2014, the film Skating to New York was released. Directed by Charles Minsky, it starred Connor Jessup, Wesley Morgan and Gage Munroe. It was Merrick's final screenplay.

== Death ==
Merrick died of cancer in Santa Monica, California on March 24, 2015.

== Credits ==
=== Screenplays ===
- Staying Together (1989)
- Memphis Belle (1990)
- Mr. Baseball (1992)
- 8 Seconds (1994)
- Oliver Twist (1997)
- Flash (1997)
- Miracle at Midnight (1998)
- The Miracle Worker (2000)
- Skating to New York (2013)

=== Plays ===
- Little Pieces (1973)
- Falling Apart (1974)
- Hidden Motives (1975)
- Children (1975)
- Tuesday's Episode (1975)
- Big City (1975)
- The Man Upstairs (1977)
- Nurseryland (1978)
- Saturday Night Special (1980)
- A Pair of Hearts (1981)
- Starry Night (1983)
- Catch the Wind (1983)
- A Hell of a Town (1984)
- Open Heart
- Pride and Joy (1985)
- Cat Feet (2004)
- Need (2005)
- The Boy Who Saw Baby Doll (2007)
- First Casualty (2012)
- Rain! The Musical (2013) Book by Monte Merrick, music and lyrics by Richard Moore

=== Novels ===
- Memphis Belle (1990)
- Shelter (1993)
- The Merlin Pool (2012)
- The Crimson Vortex (2013)
