= What Sex Am I? =

1985 documentary film

- Directed by: Lee Grant
- Produced by: Joseph Feury
- Narrated by: Lee Grant
- Cinematography: Fred Murphy
- Edited by: Joanne Burke; Stephanie Palewski
- Distributed by: HBO
- Release date: March 1985
- Running time: 57 minutes
- Country: United States
- Language: English

What Sex Am I? is a 1985 documentary film directed by Academy Award winner Lee Grant. The film follows a group of transgender individuals in mid-1980's America. Originally aired on HBO, the film is notable for its educated and sympathetic treatment of its subject, more in line with 21st century sentiment than those of the 1980s.

== Development ==
What Sex Am I? was produced under Grant and husband/producer Joseph Feury's production deal with HBO. Grant became interested in the trans experience after seeing Harvey Fierstein's La Cage aux Folles. Filming took place in California, Texas, and New York over a period of many months.

== Reception ==
The film received positive reviews. The New York Times felt that "What Sex Am I? looks sympathetically ... [and] suggests that gender is, and probably should be, beyond definition." The Chicago Tribune called the film "searing" and "brutally candid". The film has been compared to Jennie Livingston's Paris Is Burning, though pre-dating it by five years.

== Legacy ==
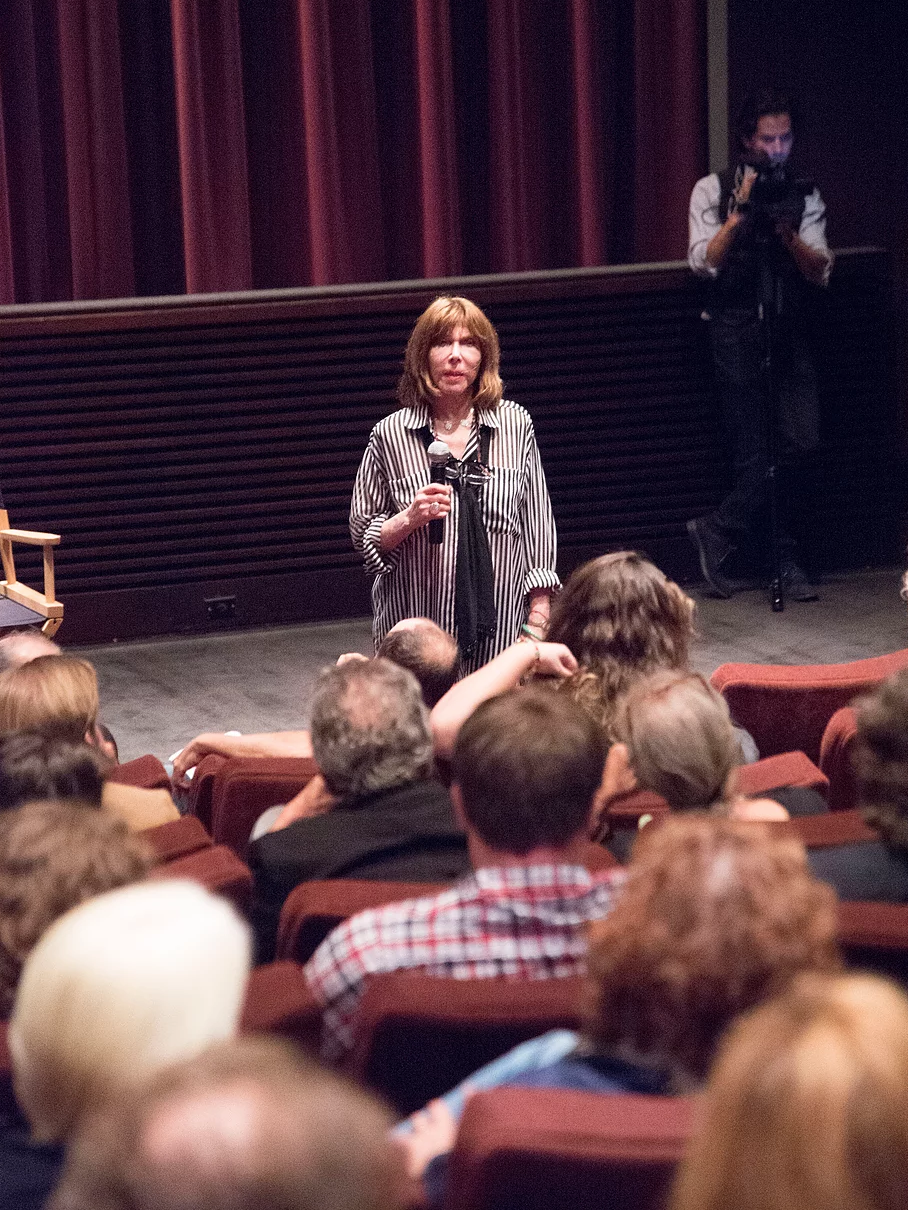
Grant during a Q&A for the film's 30th anniversary.

Copies of the film are preserved in the Academy Film Archive and the UCLA film archive. Grant, spurred on by Caitlyn Jenner's very public 2015 transition and the YouTube popularity of some of the film's clips, began working with filmmaker Taylor A. Purdee to create a 30th anniversary release of the film. This collaboration eventually led the two to give a similar treatment to the bulk of Grant's documentary work. This gave way to a discovery of the film for a younger audience, as well as a renewed interest in the film among repertory cinemas like New York's Film Forum and Santa Monica's Vidiots center which launched their monthly "VHS Vault" series with both What Sex Am I? and a short follow up doc made by Purdee entitled Lee Grant: 30 Years Later.
