= Four Diamonds =

Four Diamonds may refer to:

- Four Diamonds Fund, a charitable organization
- Four of Diamonds, a British girl group
- "The Four Diamonds", a 1972 fantasy short story by Chris Millard

== See also ==
- "Four Little Diamonds"
- Four of diamonds
