= 39th Directors Guild of America Awards =

- Date: March 7, 1987
- Location: Sheraton Premiere Hotel, Los Angeles, California; 4D, New York City
- Country: United States
- Presented by: Directors Guild of America

Highlights
- Best Director Feature Film: Platoon – Oliver Stone
- Website: https://www.dga.org/Awards/History/1980s/1986.aspx?value=1986

The 39th Directors Guild of America Awards, honoring the outstanding directorial achievements in film and television in 1986, were presented on March 7, 1987, at the Sheraton Premiere Hotel in Los Angeles and the nightclub 4D in New York. The feature film nominees were announced on January 28, 1987.

== Winners and nominees ==
=== Film ===
Feature Film

Oliver Stone – Platoon

- Woody Allen – Hannah and Her Sisters
- Randa Haines – Children of a Lesser God
- James Ivory – A Room with a View
- Rob Reiner – Stand by Me

=== Television ===
Drama Series

Will Mackenzie – Moonlighting for "Atomic Shakespeare"

- Donald Petrie – L.A. Law for "The Venus Butterfly"
- Mark Tinker – St. Elsewhere for "Afterlife"
Comedy Series

Terry Hughes – The Golden Girls for "Isn't It Romantic?"

- James Burrows – Cheers for "Tan 'N' Wash"
- Paul Lynch – Moonlighting for "Symphony in Knocked Flat"
Miniseries or TV Film

Lee Grant – Nobody's Child

- Gregory Hoblit – L.A. Law for "Pilot"
- George Schaefer – Mrs. Delafield Wants to Marry
Musical Variety

Walter C. Miller – Liberty Weekend

- Emile Ardolino – Great Performances for "Choreography by Jerome Robbins with the New York City Ballet"
- Dwight Hemion – Neil Diamond... Hello Again
Daytime Drama

Catlin Adams – ABC Afterschool Special for "Wanted: The Perfect Guy"

- Leslie Hill – CBS Schoolbreak Special for "God, The Universe and Hot Fudge Sundaes"
- Donald Petrie – CBS Schoolbreak Special for "Have You Tried Talking to Patty?"
Documentary/Actuality

Perry Miller Adato – American Masters for "Eugene O'Neill: A Glory of Ghosts"

- Kyle Good – 48 Hours on Crack Street
- David Heeley – The Spencer Tracy Legacy: A Tribute by Katharine Hepburn
Sports

Harry J. Coyle – 1986 World Series

- Andy Kindle and David Michaels – 1986 Tour de France
- Doug Wilson – 1986 U.S. Figure Skating Championships

=== Commercials ===
Commercials

Joe Pytka – John Hancock Financial's "Brothers", Henry Weinhard's' "Chuck Wagon", and Pepsi's "Floats"

- Jeremiah S. Chechik – Connecticut Bank's "Clock Tower", Michelob's "Tonight, Tonight", and AT&T's "Wave"
- Leslie Dektor – Levi's' "Celebration", Blue Cross' "Gallstones", Home Savings of America's "Harold Arlund", and SecureHorizons' "Harry's Neighborhood"
- Richard Levine – Pacific Bell's "Father & Son", Wells Fargo's "Grass Valley", and Gallo's "Weddings"
- Sidney Myers – United Way's "American Way", "Family in Crisis" and "Youth in Crisis", and Bell Atlantic's "Beauty Parlor", "Girl Trouble" and "Jazzman"

=== D.W. Griffith Award ===
- Elia Kazan

=== Frank Capra Achievement Award ===
- Henry E. Brill
