= Willmar =

Willmar may refer to:

== Places ==
- Willmar, Minnesota, United States
  - Willmar Air Force Station
  - Willmar Municipal Airport
  - Willmar Township, Kandiyohi County, Minnesota
- Willmars, a municipality in Bavaria, Germany

== People ==
- Jean-Jacques Willmar (1792–1866), Prime Minister of Luxembourg

== Companies ==
- Willmar Windows, a Canadian division of Jeld-Wen Windows & Doors
- Willmar and Sioux Falls Railway

== Sports ==
- Willmar Stingers, a summer collegiate baseball team based in Willmar, Minnesota
- Willmar WarHawks, a tier III junior hockey team based in Willmar, Minnesota

== Other ==
- Willmar 8, the name given to a group of women from Willmar, Minnesota who went on strike in 1977 to protest sexual discrimination by their employer. A documentary of the same name was released in 1981.

== See also ==
- Wilmar (disambiguation)
