= Directors Guild of America Award for Outstanding Directorial Achievement in Movies for Television and Limited Series =

Annual award for television directing

- Awarded for: Outstanding Directorial Achievement in Movies for Television and Limited Series
- Country: United States
- Presented by: Directors Guild of America
- First award: 1971
- Currently held by: Steven Zaillian for Ripley (2024)
- Website: https://www.dga.org

The Directors Guild of America Award for Outstanding Directorial Achievement in Movies for Television and Limited Series is one of the annual Directors Guild of America Awards given by the Directors Guild of America. It was first awarded at the 24th Directors Guild of America Awards in 1972. The award was previously named the Directors Guild of America Award for Outstanding Directorial Achievement in Miniseries or Movies for Television.

== Winners and nominees ==
=== 1970s ===
Year	Winners and nominees	Program	Network	Ref.
1971 (24th)	Buzz Kulik	Brian's Song	ABC	
1971 (24th)	Fielder Cook	The Price	NBC	
1971 (24th)	Delbert Mann	Jane Eyre		
1972 (25th)	Lamont Johnson	That Certain Summer	ABC	
1972 (25th)	Paul Bogart	The House Without a Christmas Tree	CBS	
1972 (25th)	Tom Gries	The Glass House	CBS	
1973 (26th)	Joseph Sargent	The Marcus-Nelson Murders	CBS	
1973 (26th)	Robert Butler	The Blue Knight	NBC	
1973 (26th)	Anthony Harvey	The Glass Menagerie	ABC	
1974 (27th)	John Korty	The Autobiography of Miss Jane Pittman	CBS	
1974 (27th)	Tom Gries	QB VII	ABC	
1974 (27th)	Lamont Johnson	The Execution of Private Slovik	NBC	
1975 (28th)	Sam O'Steen	Queen of the Stardust Ballroom	CBS	
1975 (28th)	Lamont Johnson	Fear on Trial	CBS	
1975 (28th)	Buzz Kulik	Babe		

=== 1980s ===
Year	Winners and nominees	Program	Network	Ref.
1982 (35th)	Marvin J. Chomsky	Inside the Third Reich	ABC	
1982 (35th)	Jack Hofsiss	The Elephant Man	ABC	
1982 (35th)	Delbert Mann	The Member of the Wedding	NBC	
1983 (36th)	Edward Zwick	Special Bulletin	NBC	
1983 (36th)	Daryl Duke	The Thorn Birds	ABC	
1983 (36th)	John Erman	Who Will Love My Children?	ABC	
1984 (37th)	Daniel Petrie	The Dollmaker	ABC	
1984 (37th)	Robert Greenwald	The Burning Bed	NBC	
1984 (37th)	Randa Haines	Something About Amelia	ABC	
1985 (38th)	John Erman	An Early Frost	NBC	
1985 (38th)	Jeff Bleckner	Do You Remember Love	CBS	
1985 (38th)	Lamont Johnson	Wallenberg: A Hero's Story	NBC	
1986 (39th)	Lee Grant	Nobody's Child	CBS	
1986 (39th)	Gregory Hoblit	L.A. Law (Episode: "Pilot")	NBC	
1986 (39th)	George Schaefer	Mrs. Delafield Wants to Marry	CBS	
1987 (40th)	Jud Taylor	Foxfire	CBS	
1987 (40th)	Paul Bogart	Nutcracker: Money, Madness and Murder	NBC	
1987 (40th)	Marvin J. Chomsky	Billionaire Boys Club	NBC	
1988 (41st)	Lamont Johnson	Lincoln	NBC	
1988 (41st)	Dan Curtis	War and Remembrance	ABC	
1988 (41st)	Rod Holcomb	China Beach (Episode: "Pilot")	ABC	
1989 (42nd)	Dan Curtis	War and Remembrance	ABC	
1989 (42nd)	Daniel Petrie	My Name Is Bill W.	CBS	
1989 (42nd)	Simon Wincer	Lonesome Dove	CBS	

=== 1990s ===
Year	Winners and nominees	Program	Network	Ref.
1990 (43rd)	Roger Young	Murder in Mississippi	NBC	
1990 (43rd)	Gilbert Cates	Call Me Anna	ABC	
1990 (43rd)	Peter Werner	Hiroshima: Out of the Ashes	NBC	
1991 (44th)	Stephen Gyllenhaal	Paris Trout	Showtime	
1991 (44th)	Joshua Brand	I'll Fly Away (Episode: "Pilot")	NBC	
1991 (44th)	Brian Gibson	The Josephine Baker Story	HBO	
1992 (45th)	Ron Lagomarsino	Picket Fences (Episode: "Pilot")	CBS	
1992 (45th)	Frank Pierson	Citizen Cohn	HBO	
1992 (45th)	Joseph Sargent	Miss Rose White	NBC	
1993 (46th)	Michael Ritchie	The Positively True Adventures of the Alleged Texas Cheerleader-Murdering Mom	HBO	
1993 (46th)	Emile Ardolino	Gypsy	CBS	
1993 (46th)	Robert Butler	Lois & Clark: The New Adventures of Superman (Episode: "Pilot")	ABC	
1993 (46th)	Ian Sander	I'll Fly Away: Then and Now	PBS	
1993 (46th)	Roger Spottiswoode	And the Band Played On	HBO	
1994 (47th)	Rod Holcomb	ER (Episode: "24 Hours")	NBC	
1994 (47th)	John Dahl	The Last Seduction	HBO	
1994 (47th)	John Frankenheimer	Against the Wall	HBO	
1994 (47th)	Joseph Sargent	World War II: When Lions Roared	NBC	
1994 (47th)	Betty Thomas	My Breast	CBS	
1995 (48th)	Mick Jackson	Indictment: The McMartin Trial	HBO	
1995 (48th)	Robert Markowitz	The Tuskegee Airmen	HBO	
1995 (48th)	Daniel Petrie	Kissinger and Nixon	TNT	
1995 (48th)	Frank Pierson	Truman	HBO	
1995 (48th)	Peter Werner	Almost Golden: The Jessica Savitch Story	Lifetime	
1996 (49th)	Betty Thomas	The Late Shift	HBO	
1996 (49th)	Uli Edel	Rasputin: Dark Servant of Destiny	HBO	
1996 (49th)	John Frankenheimer	Andersonville	TNT	
1996 (49th)	Robert Harmon	Gotti	HBO	
1996 (49th)	Anjelica Huston	Bastard out of Carolina	Showtime	
1997 (50th)	John Herzfeld	Don King: Only in America	HBO	
1997 (50th)	John Frankenheimer	George Wallace	TNT	
1997 (50th)	William Friedkin	12 Angry Men	Showtime	
1997 (50th)	Charles Haid	Buffalo Soldiers	TNT	
1997 (50th)	Joseph Sargent	Miss Evers' Boys	HBO	
1998 (51st)	Michael Cristofer	Gia	HBO	
1998 (51st)	Allan Arkush	The Temptations	NBC	
1998 (51st)	Steve Barron	Merlin	NBC	
1998 (51st)	Rob Cohen	The Rat Pack	HBO	
1998 (51st)	Jon Turteltaub	From the Earth to the Moon (Episode: "That's All There Is")	HBO	
1999 (52nd)	Mick Jackson	Tuesdays with Morrie	ABC	
1999 (52nd)	Martyn Burke	Pirates of Silicon Valley	TNT	
1999 (52nd)	Martha Coolidge	Introducing Dorothy Dandridge	HBO	
1999 (52nd)	Daniel Petrie	Inherit the Wind	Showtime	
1999 (52nd)	Joseph Sargent	A Lesson Before Dying	HBO	

=== 2000s ===
Year	Winners and nominees	Program	Network	Ref.
2000 (53rd)	Jeff Bleckner	The Beach Boys: An American Family	ABC	
2000 (53rd)	Kirk Browning	Death of a Salesman	Showtime	
2000 (53rd)	Martha Coolidge	If These Walls Could Talk 2 (Segment: "1972")	HBO	
2000 (53rd)	Stephen Frears and Martin Pasetta	Fail Safe	CBS	
2000 (53rd)	Joseph Sargent	For Love or Country: The Arturo Sandoval Story	HBO	
2001 (54th)	Frank Pierson	Conspiracy	HBO	
2001 (54th)	Robert Allan Ackerman	Life with Judy Garland: Me and My Shadows	ABC	
2001 (54th)	Jon Avnet	Uprising	NBC	
2001 (54th)	Billy Crystal	61*	HBO	
2001 (54th)	Mark Rydell	James Dean	TNT	
2002 (55th)	Mick Jackson	Live from Baghdad	HBO	
2002 (55th)	Julie Dash	The Rosa Parks Story	CBS	
2002 (55th)	Howard Deutch	Gleason	CBS	
2002 (55th)	John Frankenheimer	Path to War	HBO	
2002 (55th)	Richard Loncraine	The Gathering Storm	HBO	
2003 (56th)	Mike Nichols	Angels in America	HBO	
2003 (56th)	Jane Anderson	Normal	HBO	
2003 (56th)	Jeff Bleckner	The Music Man	ABC	
2003 (56th)	Rod Holcomb	The Pentagon Papers	FX	
2003 (56th)	Richard Loncraine	My House in Umbria	HBO	
2004 (57th)	Joseph Sargent	Something the Lord Made	HBO	
2004 (57th)	Robert Altman	Tanner on Tanner	Sundance Channel	
2004 (57th)	Stephen Hopkins	The Life and Death of Peter Sellers	HBO	
2004 (57th)	Lloyd Kramer	The Five People You Meet in Heaven	ABC	
2004 (57th)	Christopher Reeve	The Brooke Ellison Story	A&E	
2005 (58th)	Joseph Sargent	Warm Springs	HBO	
2005 (58th)	George C. Wolfe	Lackawanna Blues	HBO	
2005 (58th)	Darnell Martin	Oprah Winfrey Presents: Their Eyes Were Watching God	ABC	
2005 (58th)	James Steven Sadwith	Elvis	CBS	
2005 (58th)	Fred Schepisi	Empire Falls	HBO	
2006 (59th)	Walter Hill	Broken Trail	AMC	
2006 (59th)	Charles S. Dutton	Sleeper Cell: American Terror	Showtime	
2006 (59th)	Randa Haines	The Ron Clark Story	TNT	
2006 (59th)	Peter Markle	Flight 93	A&E	
2006 (59th)	Edward James Olmos	Walkout	HBO	
2007 (60th)	Yves Simoneau	Bury My Heart at Wounded Knee	HBO	
2007 (60th)	Jon Avnet	The Starter Wife	USA	
2007 (60th)	Jeremiah Chechik	The Bronx Is Burning	ESPN	
2007 (60th)	Lloyd Kramer	Oprah Winfrey Presents: Mitch Albom's For One More Day	ABC	
2007 (60th)	Mikael Salomon	The Company	TNT	
2008 (61st)	Jay Roach	Recount	HBO	
2008 (61st)	Bob Balaban	Bernard and Doris	HBO	
2008 (61st)	Tom Hooper	John Adams	HBO	
2008 (61st)	Kenny Leon	A Raisin in the Sun	ABC	
2008 (61st)	Mikael Salomon	The Andromeda Strain	A&E	
2009 (62nd)	Ross Katz	Taking Chance	HBO	
2009 (62nd)	Bob Balaban	Georgia O'Keeffe	Lifetime	
2009 (62nd)	Thomas Carter	Gifted Hands: The Ben Carson Story	TNT	
2009 (62nd)	John Kent Harrison	The Courageous Heart of Irena Sendler	CBS	
2009 (62nd)	Michael Sucsy	Grey Gardens	HBO	

=== 2010s ===
Year	Winners and nominees	Program	Network	Ref.
2010 (63rd)	Mick Jackson	Temple Grandin	HBO	
2010 (63rd)	Barry Levinson	You Don't Know Jack	HBO	
2010 (63rd)	David Nutter and Jeremy Podeswa	The Pacific (Episode: "Basilone")	HBO	
2010 (63rd)	Jeremy Podeswa	The Pacific (Episode: "Home")	HBO	
2010 (63rd)	Tim Van Patten	The Pacific (Episode: "Okinawa")	HBO	
2011 (64th)	Jon Cassar	The Kennedys	Reelz	
2011 (64th)	Jennifer Aniston, Patty Jenkins, Alicia Keys, Demi Moore, and Penelope Spheeris	Five	Lifetime	
2011 (64th)	Jeff Bleckner	Beyond the Blackboard	CBS	
2011 (64th)	Stephen Gyllenhaal	Girl Fight	Lifetime	
2011 (64th)	Michael Stevens	Thurgood	HBO	
2012 (65th)	Jay Roach	Game Change	HBO	
2012 (65th)	Greg Berlanti	Political Animals (Episode: "Pilot")	USA	
2012 (65th)	Philip Kaufman	Hemingway & Gellhorn	HBO	
2012 (65th)	Kevin Reynolds	Hatfields & McCoys	History	
2012 (65th)	Michael Rymer	American Horror Story: Asylum (Episode: "Dark Cousin")	FX	
2013 (66th)	Steven Soderbergh	Behind the Candelabra	HBO	
2013 (66th)	Stephen Frears	Muhammad Ali's Greatest Fight	HBO	
2013 (66th)	David Mamet	Phil Spector	HBO	
2013 (66th)	Beth McCarthy-Miller and Rob Ashford	The Sound of Music Live!	NBC	
2013 (66th)	Nelson McCormick	Killing Kennedy	Nat Geo	
2014 (67th)	Lisa Cholodenko	Olive Kitteridge	HBO	
2014 (67th)	Rob Ashford and Glenn Weiss	Peter Pan Live!	NBC	
2014 (67th)	Uli Edel	Houdini	History	
2014 (67th)	Ryan Murphy	The Normal Heart	HBO	
2014 (67th)	Michael Wilson	The Trip to Bountiful	Lifetime	
2015 (68th)	Dee Rees	Bessie	HBO	
2015 (68th)	Angela Bassett	Whitney	Lifetime	
2015 (68th)	Laurie Collyer	The Secret Life of Marilyn Monroe	Lifetime	
2015 (68th)	Paul Haggis	Show Me a Hero	HBO	
2015 (68th)	Kenny Leon and Matthew Diamond	The Wiz Live!	NBC	
2016 (69th)	Steven Zaillian	The Night Of (Episode: "The Beach")	HBO	
2016 (69th)	Raymond De Felitta	Madoff	ABC	
2016 (69th)	Thomas Kail and Alex Rudzinski	Grease: Live	Fox	
2016 (69th)	Kenny Leon and Alex Rudzinski	Hairspray Live!	NBC	
2016 (69th)	Jay Roach	All the Way	HBO	
2017 (70th)	Jean-Marc Vallée	Big Little Lies	HBO	
2017 (70th)	Scott Frank	Godless	Netflix	
2017 (70th)	Barry Levinson	The Wizard of Lies	HBO	
2017 (70th)	Kyra Sedgwick	Story of a Girl	Lifetime	
2017 (70th)	George C. Wolfe	The Immortal Life of Henrietta Lacks	HBO	
2018 (71st)	Ben Stiller	Escape at Dannemora	Showtime	
2018 (71st)	Cary Joji Fukunaga	Maniac	Netflix	
2018 (71st)	David Leveaux and Alex Rudzinski	Jesus Christ Superstar Live in Concert	NBC	
2018 (71st)	Barry Levinson	Paterno	HBO	
2018 (71st)	Jean-Marc Vallée	Sharp Objects	HBO	
2019 (72nd)	Johan Renck	Chernobyl	HBO	
2019 (72nd)	Ava DuVernay	When They See Us	Netflix	
2019 (72nd)	Vince Gilligan	El Camino: A Breaking Bad Movie	Netflix	
2019 (72nd)	Thomas Kail	Fosse/Verdon (Episode: "Nowadays")	FX	
2019 (72nd)	Minkie Spiro	Fosse/Verdon (Episode: "All I Care About Is Love")	FX	
2019 (72nd)	Jessica Yu	Fosse/Verdon (Episode: "Glory")	FX	

=== 2020s ===
Year	Winners and nominees	Program	Network	Ref.
2020 (73rd)	Scott Frank	The Queen's Gambit	Netflix	
2020 (73rd)	Susanne Bier	The Undoing	HBO	
2020 (73rd)	Thomas Kail	Hamilton	Disney+	
2020 (73rd)	Matt Shakman	WandaVision	Disney+	
2020 (73rd)	Lynn Shelton	Little Fires Everywhere (Episode: "Find a Way")	Hulu	
2021 (74th)	Barry Jenkins	The Underground Railroad	Amazon	
2021 (74th)	Barry Levinson	Dopesick (Episode: "First Bottle")	Hulu	
2021 (74th)	Hiro Murai	Station Eleven (Episode: "Wheel of Fire")	HBO Max	
2021 (74th)	Danny Strong	Dopesick (Episode: "The People vs. Purdue Pharma")	Hulu	
2021 (74th)	Craig Zobel	Mare of Easttown	HBO	
2022 (75th)	Helen Shaver	Station Eleven (Episode: "Who's There?")	HBO Max	
2022 (75th)	Eric Appel	Weird: The Al Yankovic Story	The Roku Channel	
2022 (75th)	Deborah Chow	Obi-Wan Kenobi	Disney+	
2022 (75th)	Jeremy Podeswa	Station Eleven (Episode: "Unbroken Circle")	HBO Max	
2022 (75th)	Tom Verica	Inventing Anna (Episode: "The Devil Wore Anna")	Netflix	
2023 (76th)	Sarah Adina Smith	Lessons in Chemistry (Episode: "Her and Him")	Apple TV+	
2023 (76th)	Shawn Levy	All the Light We Cannot See	Netflix	
2023 (76th)	Tara Miele	Lessons in Chemistry (Episode: "Introduction to Chemistry")	Apple TV+	
2023 (76th)	Millicent Shelton	Lessons in Chemistry (Episode: "Poirot")	Apple TV+	
2023 (76th)	Nzingha Stewart	Daisy Jones & the Six (Episode: "Track 10: Rock 'n' Roll Suicide")	Amazon	
2024 (77th)	Steven Zaillian	Ripley	Netflix	
2024 (77th)	Kevin Bray	The Penguin (Episode: "Top Hat")	HBO	
2024 (77th)	Alfonso Cuarón	Disclaimer	Apple TV+	
2024 (77th)	Jennifer Getzinger	The Penguin (Episode: "A Great or Little Thing")	HBO	
2024 (77th)	Helen Shaver	The Penguin (Episode: "Cent'Anni")	HBO	

== Multiple wins and nominations ==
Directors with at least one win and at least two nominations
Wins	Nominations	Name (Year)
4	4	Mick Jackson (1995, 1999, 2002, 2010)
3	8	Joseph Sargent (1973, 1992, 1994, 1997, 1999, 2000, 2004, 2005)
2	5	Lamont Johnson (1972, 1974, 1975, 1985, 1988)
2	3	Jay Roach (2008, 2012, 2016)
2	2	Steven Zaillian (2016, 2024)
1	4	Daniel Petrie (1984, 1989, 1995, 1999)
1	4	Jeff Bleckner (1985, 2000, 2003, 2011)
1	3	Rod Holcomb (1988, 1994, 2003)
1	3	Frank Pierson (1992, 1995, 2001)
1	2	Buzz Kulik (1971, 1975)
1	2	Marvin J. Chomsky (1982, 1987)
1	2	John Erman (1983, 1985)
1	2	Dan Curtis (1988, 1989)
1	2	Stephen Gyllenhaal (1991, 2011)
1	2	Betty Thomas (1994, 1996)
1	2	George C. Wolfe (2005, 2017)
1	2	Jean-Marc Vallée (2017, 2018)
1	2	Scott Frank (2017, 2020)
1	2	Helen Shaver (2022, 2024)

Directors with no win and at least two nominations
Wins	Nominations	Name (Year)
0	4	John Frankenheimer (1994, 1996, 1997, 2002)
0	4	Barry Levinson (2010, 2017, 2018, 2021)
0	3	Kenny Leon (2008, 2015, 2016)
0	3	Jeremy Podeswa (2010, 2022)
0	3	Alex Rudzinski (2016, 2018)
0	3	Thomas Kail (2016, 2019, 2020)
0	2	Delbert Mann (1971, 1982)
0	2	Tom Gries (1972, 1974)
0	2	Paul Bogart (1972, 1987)
0	2	Robert Butler (1973, 1993)
0	2	Randa Haines (1984, 2006)
0	2	Peter Werner (1990, 1995)
0	2	Uli Edel (1996, 2014)
0	2	Martha Coolidge (1999, 2000)
0	2	Stephen Frears (2000, 2013)
0	2	Jon Avnet (2001, 2007)
0	2	Richard Loncraine (2002, 2003)
0	2	Lloyd Kramer (2004, 2007)
0	2	Mikael Salomon (2007, 2008)
0	2	Bob Balaban (2008, 2009)
0	2	Rob Ashford (2013, 2014)
