= My First Mister =

2001 film by Christine Lahti

- Theatrical release poster
- Directed by: Christine Lahti
- Written by: Jill Franklyn
- Produced by: Carol Baum; Jane Goldenring
- Starring: Albert Brooks; Leelee Sobieski; Desmond Harrington; Carol Kane
- Cinematography: Jeffrey Jur
- Edited by: Wendy Greene Bricmont
- Music by: Steve Porcaro
- Production companies: Total Film Group; Film Roman; ApolloMedia Film Management GmbH
- Distributed by: Paramount Classics
- Release date: October 12, 2001 (United States)
- Running time: 109 minutes
- Countries: United States; Germany
- Language: English
- Budget: $5.2 million
- Box office: $621,000

My First Mister is a 2001 American comedy-drama film written by Jill Franklyn and directed by Christine Lahti, in her feature film directorial debut. The film is the story of an alienated teen (Leelee Sobieski) who forms an unlikely friendship with a lonely clothing store manager (Albert Brooks). The film co-stars Desmond Harrington, Carol Kane, Michael McKean and John Goodman.

== Plot ==
In an effort to secure employment at the upscale Century City Mall in Los Angeles, Jennifer, a 17-year-old "goth" girl who just graduated from high school, makes a nuisance of herself at a clothing store run by 49-year-old Randall Harris, who eventually hires her on a trial basis as a stockroom clerk. Jennifer refers to herself simply as "J", and thus asks Randall if it's okay if she calls him "R", to which he accedes.

One day, as there is nothing more to be done in the stockroom, J makes her way to the front of the store and begins to interact with customers. Encouraged by her initiative, but concerned that her appearance may frighten away potential customers, Randall buys her an appropriate outfit and promotes her to saleswoman.

Feeling isolated from the other people in her life, J finds she is attracted to Randall. After an incident that makes him question whether he can continue to trust her, J demonstrates her trust in him by revealing that she engages in self harm. The two thus strike up an unlikely friendship as they realize that neither has anyone close with whom they can confide. Made aware that J is unhappy living with her mother (who seems to pay more attention to her two pugs than her daughter) and stepfather, Randall offers her an advance on her salary so she can afford her own place, then helps her find an apartment.

As their friendship progresses, Randall consents to getting a (very small) tattoo at J's urging, only to realize at the last possible moment that he can't go through with it. In a fit of despair, he declares that they can't continue as friends. Confronted by J at his home a short time later, Randall confides his many phobias, which endears him to J even more. Their friendship restored, Randall reluctantly accompanies J to a cemetery to lie on the graves of the deceased to feel their "energy", something she does regularly. Due to the lateness of the hour, they go back to Randall's where they bond over tea and J spends the night on the couch.

The following morning J discovers Randall collapsed in the street after having told her he was going "for a run." She learns that Randall has had leukemia for many years and does not have long to live. She is initially very angry that he did not share this with her.

While collecting some of Randall's personal items from his home, J discovers the name and address of his ex-wife. Unable to contact her by phone, J drives to Albuquerque only to find her (and Randall's) son Randy, a deeply cynical young man who tells her that his mother died in a car accident six months earlier and had told him that his father had died before he was born. Although he initially refuses to drive to L.A. to see the father he has never known before he dies, he ultimately does so. Because of J's intervention, Randall and his son have a brief time to get to know one another, for which Randall is very grateful.

J's friendship with Randall inspires her to seek a closer relationship with her family, especially her mother. In Randall's final days, Jennifer organizes a dinner at which his son and Jennifer's family come together to celebrate his life.

== Cast ==
- Albert Brooks as Randall "R" Harris
- Leelee Sobieski as Jennifer "J" Wilson
- Desmond Harrington as Randy Harris Jr.
- Carol Kane as Mrs. Benson
- Michael McKean as Bob Benson
- John Goodman as Benjamin Wilson
- Henry Brown as Jack Taylor, Salesman
- Mary Kay Place as Nurse Patty
- Gary Bullock as Mr. Smithman
- Pauley Perrette as Bebe
- Lisa Jane Persky as Sheila
- Rutanya Alda as Woman at Apartment

== Production and casting ==
In the film's DVD commentary, director Christine Lahti noted Albert Brooks campaigned vigorously for the role of Randall, and that although initially doubtful about whether he could handle the heavy dramatic aspects of the character, she was won over at their first meeting. Similarly, when Sobieski was considered for the part of "J", she was initially skeptical that "such a beautiful face" could capture the feeling and look of isolation that was needed for the character, but changed her mind after meeting Sobieski.

Lahti expressed deep disappointment that the film was rated R (for language), despairing that it would likely not be seen by many teenagers who would like and relate to the characters. She also lamented that the shooting schedule, constrained by the film's budget, didn't give her the opportunity to shoot more "coverage" (camera perspectives, such as "close-ups"), and thus more editing choices to convey the emotional content of some scenes.

Leelee Sobieski's character, Jennifer, has a number of facial piercings and cartilage piercings in both ears, but does not have her earlobes pierced—to which a reference is made in the movie. At the time the movie was made, Sobieski herself did not have pierced earlobes, as she did not have them done until 2006. Specially for her part in this movie, she did, however, have both nostrils, both eyebrows and her lower lip pierced, along with her navel and the cartilage of both ears. After filming was completed, she removed the piercings and allowed them to close up again but kept the jewelry as a souvenir of the movie.

== Release ==
My First Mister premiered at the 2001 Sundance Film Festival. It was given a limited release in the United States on October 12, 2001.

== Reception ==
Film critic Roger Ebert praised the film:

These two characters are so particular and sympathetic that the whole movie could simply observe them...The bravest thing about the movie is the way it doesn't cave in to teenage multiplex demographics with another story about dumb adults and cool kids. My First Mister is about reaching out, about seeing the other person, about having something to say and being able to listen. So what if the ending is in autopilot? At least it's a flight worth taking.

Lawrence Van Gelder of The New York Times wrote:

Of all the odd couples who inhabit film, surely among the most endearing are Jennifer and Randall, the lost souls and repressed good hearts at the sweet, sentimental center of Christine Lahti's life-affirming My First Mister.

On the review aggregator Rotten Tomatoes, the film has an approval rating of 53% based on 81 reviews. The site’s critical consensus reads, "Though well-acted, My First Mister succumbs to contrived sentimentality in its last half." Metacritic, which uses a weighted average, assigned the film a score of 48 out of 100, based on 27 critics, indicating "mixed or average" reviews.

== See also ==
- Lost in Translation
