= Monteith and Rand =

American comedy team

Monteith and Rand in a 1979 Broadway program for their show at the Booth Theatre, presented by James Lipton Productions

Monteith and Rand were an American sketch and improvisational comedy duo consisting of John Monteith (November 1, 1948 – January 16, 2018) and Suzanne Rand (September 8, 1949 – April 2, 2025). Their act combined sketch comedy scenes with improvisation based on audience suggestions. They performed on Broadway at the Booth Theatre in 1979, in a show produced by James Lipton, following a successful Off-Broadway run.

== History ==
Monteith and Rand met in Cambridge, Massachusetts, in 1972 while performing with The Proposition, an improvisational revue. Rand had briefly performed with the Chicago troupe of The Second City, while Monteith later joined the company's Toronto troupe.

They reunited in 1976 and began performing together in clubs on Cape Cod, initially as a warm-up act for the singing group Jade and Sarsaparilla. They subsequently performed in Boston and appeared on The Tonight Show Starring Johnny Carson. In 1978, they made their Off-Broadway debut at Theater East before taking their show to Broadway the following year.

In 1982, Monteith and Rand were slated to make a dramatic debut in Monte Merrick's A Hell of a Town, but the production folded for lack of funds before opening. Two years later, Monteith starred in the show's premiere in Rochester opposite Joanna Gleason. The production transferred to Broadway but closed after 32 performances. The duo also appeared at the 1997 Big Stinkin' International Improv & Sketch Comedy Festival in Austin.

Rand moved from Boston to New York in 1982, where Monteith was already living. They remained in New York City, where they taught and performed. Monteith later taught improvisation at HB Studio for 25 years.

John Monteith died in Jersey City, New Jersey, on January 16, 2018, at the age of 69. Suzanne Rand died in Manhattan on April 2, 2025, at the age of 75.

== Style and performance ==
At the time of their Broadway debut, approximately two-thirds of Monteith and Rand's act consisted of prepared scenes, with the remainder improvised from audience suggestions. They performed on a bare stage using two director's chairs and drew from a repertory of approximately 20 prepared scenes, which they continued to revise during performances. Shortly before their Broadway opening, they added their first musical number, in which Rand improvised a blues song from two lines supplied by the audience while Monteith accompanied her on piano.

They developed material orally rather than writing scripts. When one of them proposed an idea, they recorded themselves exploring it, established a beginning, middle and ending, and then allowed the dialogue and structure to evolve before audiences. They distinguished their work from stand-up comedy, describing their longer character scenes as miniature plays with a climax and denouement rather than a succession of isolated jokes.

Bill Russell, a longtime collaborator whom the duo knew from their years in Cambridge, traveled with the show and was billed as their assistant. Monteith and Rand described him as their “third eye”: they tested new material for him, and during performances Russell decided when each improvisation should end by signaling for a blackout.

Producer James Lipton said their improvisations differed from performers who guided apparently spontaneous material toward prepared routines, praising Monteith and Rand for creating new material during each performance.

== Reception ==
Robin Brantley reported that Monteith and Rand's 1978 Off-Broadway debut received favorable notices and comparisons with Nichols and May. In a review quoted by Brantley, The New York Times critic Walter Kerr called them “a decidedly engaging and often inventive couple”, although Monteith and Rand regarded their work as reflecting a different generation and comic perspective.

Reviewing their Broadway show in 1979, Angela Taylor of The New York Times called them “highly talented comedians, quick on their feet and resourceful” and praised their charm and wit. In 1982, Lloyd Grove of The Washington Post described their risk-taking performance style as “daredevil business” and said its successful moments were exhilarating.

== Sources ==
- Donovan, Mark (October 23, 1978). "The Nichols and May of Today Call Themselves Monteith and Rand". People. Vol. 10, no. 17.
- Kantrowitz, Barbara (November 30, 1979). "Monteith and Rand: Success Comes After Years of Hard Work". The Evening Independent. p. 4B.
