= Down and Out in America =

- Video tape cover
- Directed by: Lee Grant
- Produced by: Joseph Feury; Milton Justice; Carol Cuddy
- Narrated by: Lee Grant
- Cinematography: Tom Hurwitz
- Edited by: Milton Moses Ginsberg
- Music by: Tom Manoff
- Distributed by: HBO
- Release date: 1985
- Running time: 57 minutes
- Country: United States
- Language: English

Down and Out in America is a 1985 American documentary film directed by Lee Grant. The documentary won the Academy Award for Best Documentary Feature Film at the 59th Academy Awards, tied with Artie Shaw: Time Is All You've Got.

== Summary ==
It is a biting critique of Reaganomics and exploration of poverty in the United States. It won an Academy Award for Best Documentary Feature, tying with Artie Shaw: Time Is All You've Got.

== Production ==
Produced by Grant's husband Joseph Feury and Milton Justice, this was the first Academy Award for HBO.

Down and Out in America was produced under Grant and husband/producer Joseph Feury's production deal with HBO. The film was greenlit while Grant was still on location in Yugoslavia on another project. She reportedly told Feury that the subject was too important and that if she could not return in time he should let another director make the film. He refused and convinced her to wrap her current project as early as possible and make the documentary.

== Reception and legacy ==
The film received largely positive reviews. The New York Times felt that "DOWN AND OUT IN AMERICA is clear about its message: The system has failed, and the American dream has died.". The film went on to receive the Academy Award for Best Documentary feature, the first Oscar win for the cable broadcast industry.

The film's negative has been preserved in the Academy Film Archive. It is regularly taught in university film and journalism classes. A new print premiered at New York's Film Forum in late 2019 as part of a 13-film retrospective of Grant's work as both actor and director, and the kick off of the film's digital and repertory re-release. Grant and Barbara Kopple introduced the Film Forum screening. It remains one of the most influential portraits of Reaganomics. In April 2020, in response to the COVID-19 crisis, the re-release of Grant's documentaries was re-imagined as one of the first examples of virtual cinema and became "the first virtual repertory series."
