= No Place Like Home (1989 film) =

- Genre: Drama
- Screenplay by: Ara Watson; Sam Blackwell
- Directed by: Lee Grant
- Starring: Christine Lahti; Jeff Daniels
- Theme music composer: Charles Gross
- Country of origin: United States
- Original language: English

Production
- Producers: Joseph Feury; Christopher Keyser; Amy Lippman
- Production location: Pittsburgh
- Cinematography: Laszlo George (Uncredited); Tony Pierce-Roberts
- Editor: Rick Shaine
- Running time: 100 minutes
- Production company: Joseph Feury Productions

Original release
- Network: CBS
- Release: December 3, 1989

No Place Like Home is a 1989 television film directed by Lee Grant and starring Christine Lahti and Jeff Daniels.

== Cast ==
- Christine Lahti as Zan Cooper
- Jeff Daniels as Mike Cooper
- Scott Marlowe as Eddie Cooper
- CCH Pounder as Prue
- Kathy Bates as Bonnie Cooper
- Rick Aviles as J.J.

== Accolades and nominations ==
For her performance, Lahti won the Golden Globe Award for Best Actress – Miniseries or Television Film. Lahti was also nominated for the Primetime Emmy Award for Outstanding Lead Actress in a Limited Series or Movie.
