= Wilmar =

Wilmar may refer to:

- Wilmar, Arkansas
- Wilmar, California
- Wilmar International (丰益国际), a Singaporean food processing and investment holding company
- Wilmar Valdez (born 1965), Uruguayan football executive

== See also ==
- Willmar, Minnesota
- Willmar (disambiguation)
