= Virtual cinema =

Virtual cinema is a term referring to video on demand streaming services facilitated by independent film distributors and art-house theaters to release new films and to share profits. Under the service, patrons can watch a movie on their personal devices by paying an "admission price" which supports a physically located theater.

== Background ==
As a result of the COVID-19 pandemic, movie theaters were closed down for public safety. In 2020 from March through April, virtual cinema proliferated during the theaters' closures. Several distributors of independent films, including Kino Lorber, Film Movement, and Music Box Films, were early adopters. The initiative grew to involve theater chains and film festivals that were affected by the pandemic. Major specialty chains Alamo Drafthouse and Laemmle Theaters began partnering with the distributors. The strategy is recognized as a way for distributors to make up for lost box office sales and to empower moviegoers to support their local theater.

== Examples ==
In April 2020, in response to the COVID-19 crisis, the re-release of actress turned director Lee Grant's documentaries (including the 1986 Oscar-winning Down and Out in America) was re-imagined as one of the first examples of virtual cinema and became "the first virtual repertory series."

Other "virtual cinema" examples included the animated films Trolls World Tour and Scoob! alongside the Studio Ghibli library provided by GKIDS.

== See also ==
- Impact of the COVID-19 pandemic on cinema
- Virtual reality
- Binge watching
- Cinephilia
