= Lieberman in Love =

1995 film by Christine Lahti

- Directed by: Christine Lahti
- Written by: Polly Platt
- Based on: Lieberman in Love by W. P. Kinsella
- Produced by: Thom Colwell; Leslie Hoffman; Jana Sue Memel; Hillary Anne Ripps; Cynthia Sherman
- Starring: Danny Aiello; Christine Lahti; Nancy Travis
- Cinematography: Marc Reshovsky
- Edited by: Lisa Bromwell
- Production company: Chanticleer Films
- Release date: 1995
- Running time: 39 minutes
- Country: United States
- Language: English

Lieberman in Love is a 1995 American short film directed by Christine Lahti. It won an Oscar in 1996 for Best Live Action Short Subject.

A short story by W. P. Kinsella, "Lieberman in Love", was the basis for the film. The Oscar win came as a surprise to Kinsella, who, watching the award telecast from home, had no idea the film had been made and released. He was not listed in the film's credits or acknowledged by Lahti in her acceptance speech. A full-page advertisement ran in Variety apologizing to Kinsella for the error.

== Plot ==
At a resort in Hawaii, wealthy Joe Lieberman is attracted to a guest named Shaleen, who turns out to be a prostitute. They begin a professional relationship, which continues even after Joe develops a romantic interest in a married woman, Kate, who sells him a condominium.

== Cast ==
- Danny Aiello as Joe Lieberman
- Christine Lahti as Shaleen
- Nancy Travis as Kate
- Allan Arbus as Elderly Man
- Lisa Banes as Woman
- Beth Grant as Linda Baker
- David Rasche as M.C. at Luau

== Home media ==
This film has been released in Australia as one of four shorts (Witness, Duke of Groove, Lieberman in Love, Session Man), on a budget DVD.

== See also ==
- 1995 in film
- Field of Dreams
