= Christine Lahti =

American actress and director (born 1950)

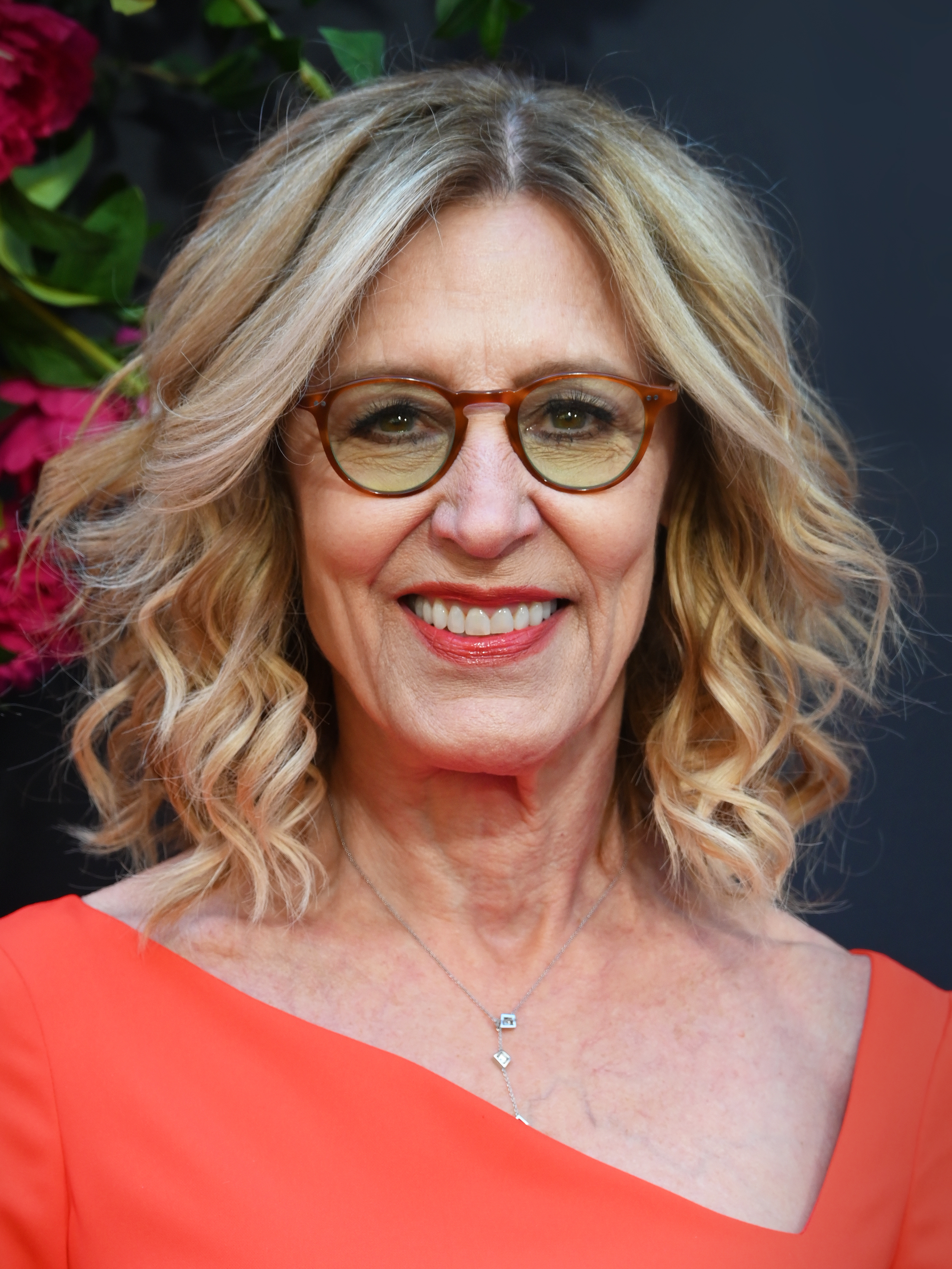
- Lahti in 2025
- Born: Christine Ann Lahti; April 4, 1950 (age 76); Birmingham, Michigan, U.S.
- Education: Florida State University; University of Michigan (BFA)
- Occupation: Actress
- Years active: 1973–present
- Spouse: Thomas Schlamme (m. 1983)
- Children: 3

Christine Ann Lahti (born April 4, 1950) is an American actress and filmmaker. She was nominated for the Academy Award for Best Supporting Actress for the 1984 film Swing Shift. Her other film roles include ...And Justice for All (1979), Housekeeping (1987), Running on Empty (1988), Leaving Normal (1992), and A Beautiful Day in the Neighborhood (2019). For her directorial debut with the 1995 short film Lieberman in Love, she won the Academy Award for Best Live Action Short Film.

Lahti made her Broadway debut in 1980 as a replacement in Loose Ends and went on to star in the Broadway productions of Present Laughter (1982) and The Heidi Chronicles (1989). An eight-time Golden Globe nominee and six-time Emmy Award nominee, she won a Golden Globe for the 1989 TV movie No Place Like Home and won a Golden Globe and an Emmy in 1998 for her role as Kate Austin in the CBS series Chicago Hope (1995–99). She returned to Broadway in 2009 to star in God of Carnage. She has had a number of recurring roles: as Sonya Paxton in the NBC series Law & Order: Special Victims Unit (2009–11), as Doris McGarrett in the CBS series Hawaii Five-0 (2012–19), as Laurel Hitchin in NBC's The Blacklist (2015–17), as Sheryl Luria in the CBS/Paramount+ series Evil (2019–24), and as Ruby Quinn in the CBS series Fire Country (2025).

== Early life and education ==
Lahti was born in Birmingham, Michigan, the daughter of Elizabeth Margaret (née Tabar), a painter, homemaker, and nurse, and Paul Theodore Lahti, a surgeon. She has three sisters, Carol, Catherine, and Linda, and two brothers, Paul Jr. and James Lahti. Her paternal grandparents were Finnish immigrants and her maternal grandparents were from Austria-Hungary. Lahti was raised in the Lutheran Church.

Lahti studied Fine Arts at Florida State University and received her bachelor's degree in Drama from the University of Michigan, where she joined Delta Gamma sorority. She studied acting at HB Studio in New York City, as well as completing a two-year professional actor training program at the William Esper Studio for the performing arts in Manhattan.

== Career ==
After college, Lahti headed to New York City in 1973, where she worked as a waitress and did commercials. Her breakthrough movie was ...And Justice for All (1979) with Al Pacino. In the film Whose Life Is It Anyway? (1981), starring Richard Dreyfuss and John Cassavetes, she was cast as a physician who grows attached to a paralyzed patient seeking the right to leave the hospital. Later, she was cast in an important role in Running on Empty, a 1988 movie in which she and Judd Hirsch played the parents of a musically promising son; the family went underground to avoid the FBI after the parents had damaged a napalm factory, and they all must periodically move on short notice and assume new identities. She has also focused on television, beginning with her role in the made-for-TV adaptation of The Executioner's Song (1982). She appeared on Broadway in Wendy Wasserstein's seriocomic play, The Heidi Chronicles.

Lahti received an Academy Award nomination for Best Supporting Actress for Swing Shift (1984), and won an Academy Award for Best Short Film, Live Action for Lieberman in Love (1995), in which she starred and also directed. It was adapted from Lieberman in Love, a short story by W. P. Kinsella. Lahti won a Primetime Emmy Award and a Golden Globe Award in 1998 for her role in Chicago Hope. Lahti was in the bathroom when she won the third award and finally came to the stage following an attempt by show producer John Tinker to accept on her behalf and an interruptive riff by Robin Williams. In 1999, she presented with a piece of toilet paper attached to her shoe as an "inside joke" about her previous appearance.

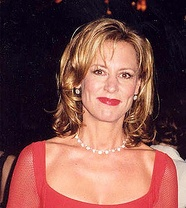
At the Governor's Ball held after the 49th Annual Emmy Awards, 1997

In 2001, her first directorial feature-length film, My First Mister, was released. Starring Leelee Sobieski and Albert Brooks, the movie debuted with good reviews. In DVD commentary she applauds the work of her cast and crew, remarking "[I] was very lucky to have such a wonderful crew..." She said she felt regret that the film was rated R, for language, despairing that the movie might not be viewed by teens who would relate with the characters. Also, Lahti mentioned that she would have liked to have had more time to shoot different perspectives in order to facilitate story arc.

Lahti starred in the executive ADA role on Law & Order: Special Victims Unit as Sonya Paxton while the character Alexandra Cabot (Stephanie March) was in appeals. She was in the first four episodes of the 11th season and returned for the show's eighth episode, where she clashed with Cabot. Lahti later guest starred in the ninth and 17th episodes of the 12th season, where she reprised her role as Paxton. Her character was murdered in the 17th episode.

She returned to Broadway upon joining the cast of the Tony Award–winning play God of Carnage on November 17, 2009, replacing Marcia Gay Harden. Both actresses had a few special appearances on Law & Order: Special Victims Unit. In September 2011, Lahti starred with Morgan Freeman in the Broadway debut of Dustin Lance Black's play, 8—a reenactment of the federal trial that overturned California's Prop 8 ban on same-sex marriage—as Kris Perry. In March 2012, she was featured with Jamie Lee Curtis and Jansen Panettiere at the Wilshire Ebell Theatre. The production was broadcast on YouTube to raise money for the American Foundation for Equal Rights.

Her book of autobiographical essays, titled True Stories From an Unreliable Eyewitness, was published in 2018 by Harper Wave.

In 2020, Lahti appeared as a guest on the Studio 60 on the Sunset Strip marathon fundraiser episode of The George Lucas Talk Show.

== Personal life ==
Lahti has been married to television director Thomas Schlamme since September 4, 1983. They have three children. Lahti resides in Los Angeles, California, with her family. She also owns an apartment in Greenwich Village.

In 2004, Lahti took part in a protest against the murders of women in Ciudad Juárez, Mexico.

Since May 2005, Lahti has been a contributor at HuffPost.

== Performances and works ==
=== Film ===
List of film appearances, with year, title, and role shown
Year	Film	Role	Notes
1979	...And Justice for All	Gail Packer	
1981	Whose Life Is It Anyway?	Dr. Clare Scott	
1981	Ladies and Gentlemen, The Fabulous Stains	Aunt Linda	
1984	Swing Shift	Hazel Zanussi	New York Film Critics Circle Award for Best Supporting Actress; Nominated—Academy Award for Best Supporting Actress; Nominated—Golden Globe Award for Best Supporting Actress – Motion Picture
1986	Desert Bloom	Rose Chismore	Uncredited
1986	Just Between Friends	Sandy Dunlap	
1987	Stacking	Kathleen Morgan	aka Season of Dreams
1987	Housekeeping	Sylvie	
1988	Running on Empty	Annie Pope/Cynthia Manfield	Los Angeles Film Critics Association Award for Best Actress; Nominated—Golden Globe Award for Best Actress – Motion Picture Drama
1989	Miss Firecracker	Clara Archer	
1989	Gross Anatomy	Dr. Rachel Woodruff	
1990	Funny About Love	Meg Lloyd Bergman	
1991	The Doctor	Anne MacKee	
1992	Leaving Normal	Darly Peters	
1995	Lieberman in Love	Shaleen	Also director Academy Award for Best Live Action Short Film
1995	The Four Diamonds	Doctor and Queen Raptenahad	
1995	Hideaway	Lindsey	
1996	Pie in the Sky	Ruby	
2001	My First Mister	Mall Patron	Also director
2003	Out of the Ashes	Gisella Perl	
2008	Smart People	Nancy	
2008	Yonkers Joe	Janice	
2009	Obsessed	Reese	
2010	Flying Lessons	Carolyn Conway	
2012	Petunia	Felicia Petunia	
2012	Touchback	Thelma	
2013	Hateship, Loveship	Eileen	
2015	The Steps	Sherry	
2015	Touched with Fire	Sara	
2015	Safelight	Peg	
2016	Operator	Beth Larsen	
2017	Becks	Ann	
2019	A Beautiful Day in the Neighborhood	Ellen	
2025	Bird In Hand	Carlotta	

=== Television ===
List of television appearances, with year, title, and role shown
Year	Title	Role	Notes
1978	The Harvey Korman Show	Maggie Kavanaugh	Recurring role, 5 episodes
1978	The Last Tenant	Carol	Television film
1978	Dr. Scorpion	Tania Reston	Television film
1980	The Henderson Monster	Dr. Louise Casimir	Television film
1981	Wolcott	Melinda Marin	4-part British miniseries
1982	The Executioner's Song	Brenda	Television film
1984	Single Bars, Single Women	Elsie	Television film
1985	Love Lives On	Marylin	Television film
1987	Amerika	Alethea Milford	Television miniseries Nominated—Golden Globe Award for Best Supporting Actress – Series, Miniseries or Television Film; Nominated—Primetime Emmy Award for Outstanding Supporting Actress in a Miniseries or a Movie
1989	No Place Like Home	Zan Cooper	Television film Golden Globe Award for Best Actress – Miniseries or Television Film; Nominated—Primetime Emmy Award for Outstanding Lead Actress in a Miniseries or a Movie
1991	Crazy from the Heart	Charlotte Bain	Television film
1992	The Fear Inside	Meredith Cole	Television film Nominated—CableACE Award for Best Actress in a Movie or Miniseries
1994	Frasier	Laura (voice)	Episode: "Author, Author"
1995–1999	Chicago Hope	Dr. Kathryn Austin	Main role Golden Globe Award for Best Actress – Television Series Drama; Primetime Emmy Award for Outstanding Lead Actress in a Drama Series; Satellite Award for Best Actress – Television Series Drama; Nominated—Golden Globe Award for Best Actress – Television Series Drama; Nominated—Primetime Emmy Award for Outstanding Lead Actress in a Drama Series (1996–97, 1999); Nominated—Screen Actors Guild Award for Outstanding Performance by a Female Actor in a Drama Series (1996–99); Nominated—Screen Actors Guild Award for Outstanding Performance by an Ensemble in a Drama Series (1996–98); Nominated—Viewers for Quality Television Award for Best Actress in a Quality Drama Series
1997	Hope	Emma Percy	Television film
1999	Judgment Day:The Ellie Nesler Story	Ellie Nesler	Television film
2000	An American Daughter	Lyssa Dent Hughes	Television film Nominated—Golden Globe Award for Best Actress – Miniseries or Television Film
2001	Ally McBeal	Sydney Gale	Episode: "Queen Bee"
2002	Women vs. Men	Dana	Television film
2002	The Pilot's Wife	Kathryn Lyons	Television film
2003	Out of the Ashes	Gisella Perl	Television film
2004	Revenge of the Middle-Aged Woman	Rose	Television film
2004–2005	Jack & Bobby	Grace McCallister	Main role Nominated—Golden Globe Award for Best Actress – Television Series Drama; Nominated—Screen Actors Guild Award for Outstanding Performance by a Female Actor in a Drama Series
2006	Studio 60 on the Sunset Strip	Martha O'Dell	3 episodes
2009	Operating Instructions	H. Keller	Television film
2009–2011	Law & Order: Special Victims Unit	Sonya Paxton	Recurring role, 7 episodes
2011	The Doctor	Emily Campbell	Unsold television pilot
2012–2019	Hawaii Five-0	Doris McGarrett	Recurring role, 10 episodes
2015	Grace and Frankie	Lydia Foster	Episode: "The Funeral"
2015–2017	The Blacklist	Laurel Hitchin	Recurring role, 10 episodes
2015–2016	The Good Wife	Andrea Stevens	2 episodes
2017–2018	The Good Fight	Andrea Stevens	2 episodes
2019–2024	Evil	Sheryl Luria	Main role Nominated—Critics' Choice Super Award for Best Actress in a Horror Series; Nominated—Critics' Choice Television Award for Best Supporting Actress in a Drama Series
2020	Curb Your Enthusiasm	Herself	Episode: "Artificial Fruit"
2025	Fire Country	Ruby Quinn	1st Episode: "Your Voice in My Head"

=== Theater ===
List of stage appearances, with year, title, and role shown
Year	Title	Role	Director(s)	Venue
1980	Loose Ends	Susan	Alan Schneider	Circle in the Square Theatre
1980	Division Street	Dianah	Tom Moore	Ambassador Theatre
1981	Scenes and Revelations	Helena	Sheldon Epps	Circle in the Square Theatre
1982–83	Present Laughter	Joanna Lyppiatt	George C. Scott	Circle in the Square Theatre
1989–90	The Heidi Chronicles	Heidi Holland	Daniel Sullivan	Plymouth Theatre
2009–10	God of Carnage	Veronica	Matthew Warchus	Bernard B. Jacobs Theatre
2017	Fucking A	Hester Smith	Jo Bonney	Signature Theatre
2018	Gloria: A Life	Gloria Steinem	Diane Paulus	Daryl Roth Theatre
2023	The Smile of Her	Herself	Robert H. Egan	Berkshire Theatre Festival
2026	The Smile of Her	Herself	Mêlisa Annis	Marylebone Theatre, London

=== Published works ===
- Lahti, Christine. True Stories from an Unreliable Eyewitness (2018)

== Awards and nominations ==
Lahti has received numerous accolades for her work in film and television, including an Academy Award, a Golden Globe Award, a Primetime Emmy Award, and awards from the Los Angeles Film Critics Association, New York Film Critics Circle, and the Screen Actors Guild.

Christine Lahti awards and nominations
Year	Award	Category	Work	Result
1984	Los Angeles Film Critics Association Awards	Best Supporting Actress	Swing Shift	Nominated
1984	New York Film Critics Circle Awards	Best Supporting Actress	Swing Shift	Won
1985	Academy Awards	Best Supporting Actress	Swing Shift	Nominated
1987	New York Film Critics Circle Awards	Best Actress	Housekeeping	Nominated
1988	Los Angeles Film Critics Association Awards	Best Actress	Running on Empty	Won
1990	Primetime Emmy Awards	Outstanding Lead Actress in a Miniseries or a Special	No Place Like Home (as Zan Cooper)	Nominated
1990	Golden Globe Awards	Best Actress – Miniseries or Motion Picture Made for Television	No Place Like Home	Won
1992	CableACE Awards	Actress in a Movie or Miniseries	Crazy from the Heart	Won
1993	CableACE Awards	Actress in a Movie or Miniseries	The Fear Inside	Nominated
1996	Academy Awards	Best Live Action Short Film	Lieberman in Love (shared with Jana Sue Memel)	Won
1996	Primetime Emmy Awards	Outstanding Lead Actress in a Drama Series	Chicago Hope (as Kathryn Austin)	Nominated
1996	CableACE Awards	Supporting Actress in a Movie or Miniseries	The Four Diamonds	Nominated
1996	Viewers for Quality Television Awards	Best Actress in a Quality Drama Series	Chicago Hope	Nominated
1997	Primetime Emmy Awards	Outstanding Lead Actress in a Drama Series	Chicago Hope (as Kathryn Austin)	Nominated
1997	Golden Globe Awards	Best Actress – Television Series Drama	Chicago Hope	Nominated
1997	Screen Actors Guild Awards	Outstanding Performance by a Female Actor in a Drama Series	Chicago Hope	Nominated
1997	Screen Actors Guild Awards	Outstanding Performance by an Ensemble in a Drama Series	Chicago Hope (shared with cast)	Nominated
1997	Online Film & Television Association Awards	Best Actress in a Series	Chicago Hope	Nominated
1997	Viewers for Quality Television Awards	Best Actress in a Quality Drama Series	Chicago Hope	Nominated
1997	Satellite Awards	Best Actress in a Series, Drama	Chicago Hope	Won
1998	Primetime Emmy Awards	Outstanding Lead Actress in a Drama Series	Chicago Hope (as Kathryn Austin)	Won
1998	Golden Globe Awards	Best Actress – Television Series Drama	Chicago Hope	Won
1998	Screen Actors Guild Awards	Outstanding Performance by a Female Actor in a Drama Series	Chicago Hope	Nominated
1998	Screen Actors Guild Awards	Outstanding Performance by an Ensemble in a Drama Series	Chicago Hope	Nominated
1998	Online Film & Television Association Awards	Best Actress in a Drama Series	Chicago Hope	Nominated
1998	Online Film & Television Association Awards	Best Actress in a Series	Chicago Hope	Nominated
1998	Viewers for Quality Television Awards	Best Actress in a Quality Drama Series	Chicago Hope	Nominated
1998	Lone Star Film & Television Awards	Best TV Supporting Actress	Hope	Won
1999	Primetime Emmy Awards	Outstanding Lead Actress in a Drama Series	Chicago Hope (as Kathryn Austin)	Nominated
1999	People's Choice Awards	Favorite Female TV Performer	Chicago Hope	Nominated
1999	Screen Actors Guild Awards	Outstanding Performance by a Female Actor in a Drama Series	Chicago Hope	Nominated
1999	Online Film & Television Association Awards	Best Actress in a Drama Series	Chicago Hope	Nominated
2001	Golden Globe Awards	Best Actress – Miniseries or Motion Picture Made for Television	Trial by Media	Nominated
2001	Chicago International Film Festival	Gold Hugo – Best Feature	My First Mister	Nominated
2005	Golden Globe Awards	Best Actress – Television Series Drama	Jack & Bobby	Nominated
2005	Screen Actors Guild Awards	Outstanding Performance by a Female Actor in a Drama Series	Jack & Bobby	Nominated
2005	Prism Awards	Performance in a Drama Series Storyline	Jack & Bobby	Won
2005	Women's Image Network Awards	Actress in Made-for-TV Movie/Miniseries	Revenge of the Middle-Aged Woman	Won
2005	High Falls Film Festival	Susan B. Anthony "Failure is Impossible" Award	—	Won
2007	Online Film & Television Association Awards	Best Guest Actress in a Drama Series	Studio 60 on the Sunset Strip	Nominated
2011	Prism Awards	Performance in a Drama Series Episode	Law & Order: Special Victims Unit	Nominated
2017	Northern Ontario Music and Film Awards	Best Performance by an Actor in a Northern Ontario Production	The Steps	Nominated
2022	Critics Choice Awards	Best Supporting Actress in a Drama Series	Evil	Nominated
2022	Critics' Choice Super Awards	Best Actress in a Horror Series	Evil	Nominated
