= Revenge of the Middle-Aged Woman =

- Genre: Drama
- Based on: Revenge of the Middle-Aged Woman by Elizabeth Buchan
- Teleplay by: Nancey Silvers
- Directed by: Sheldon Larry
- Starring: Christine Lahti; Brian Kerwin; Bryan Brown; Abby Brammell
- Music by: Phil Marshall
- Country of origin: United States
- Original language: English

Production
- Executive producer: Dan Wigutow
- Producer: Robert J. Wilson
- Cinematography: Kees Van Oostrum
- Editor: John Duffy
- Running time: 90 minutes
- Production companies: Dan Wigutow Productions; Sony Pictures Television

Original release
- Network: CBS
- Release: September 26, 2004

Revenge of the Middle-Aged Woman is a 2004 American television drama film directed by Sheldon Larry and starring Christine Lahti, Brian Kerwin, Bryan Brown, and Abby Brammell. The film premiered on September 26, 2004 on CBS.

== Plot ==
Rose, a middle-aged woman who is married to Nathan Lloyd loses her job and her husband to her assistant Mindy. Her life gets broken, then she runs into Australian businessman, Hal Thorne, an old love.

== Cast ==
- Christine Lahti as Rose
- Brian Kerwin as Nathan Lloyd
- Abby Brammell as Mindy
- Bryan Brown as Hal Thorne
- Jon Bernthal as man in office
