= Women on Trial (1992 film) =

1983 documentary film

- Directed by: Lee Grant
- Produced by: Joseph Feury; Lee Grant; Virginia Cotts; Roberta Morris Purdee
- Narrated by: Lee Grant
- Cinematography: Hart Perry
- Edited by: Geof Bartz
- Music by: Tom Carpenter
- Distributed by: HBO; Hope Runs High
- Release date: October 26, 1992
- Running time: 57 minutes
- Country: United States
- Language: English

Women on Trial is a 1992 documentary film directed, produced and narrated by Academy Award winner Lee Grant. The film follows a group of women navigating the family court system in Texas. Originally scheduled to aired on HBO, the film played only a single night before being pulled from the public after inciting a million dollar lawsuit initiated Texas family court judge Charles Dean Huckabee. The story unfolds as woman after woman loses custody of her children to fathers who have either a documented history of abuse, or admittedly do not want custody of the children.

== Development ==
Women on Trial was produced under Grant and husband/producer Joseph Feury's production deal with HBO. Grant became interest after seeing the number of women losing custody of their children to allegedly abusive fathers in Harris County, Texas.

== Reception ==
The film received positive reviews. Before the film was pulled, disappearing for the next 27 years, Variety felt that it was "chilling...starkly moving."

== Legacy ==
The film is part of Grant's documentary collection and is expected to receive a digital and limited repertory cinema re-release in the Winter of 2019-2020 along with the majority of her non-fiction work. A screening at New York's Film Forum in December 2019 will mark the film's first public exhibition since its single night on HBO.
