= Polly Platt =

American film producer (1939–2011)

- Born: Mary Marr Platt; January 29, 1939; Fort Sheridan, Illinois, U.S.
- Died: July 27, 2011 (aged 72); New York City, U.S.
- Occupations: Film producer, production designer, screenwriter
- Years active: 1966–2011
- Spouse(s): Philip Klein (m. 1959; died 1960) Peter Bogdanovich (m. 1962; div. 1971) Tony Wade (m. 1979; died 1985)
- Children: 2

Mary Marr "Polly" Platt (January 29, 1939 – July 27, 2011) was an American film producer, production designer, and screenwriter. She was the first woman accepted into the Art Directors Guild, in 1971. In addition to her credited work, she was known as a mentor (for which she was honored with Women in Film Crystal Award) as well as an uncredited collaborator and networker. In the case of the latter, she is credited with contributing to the success of ex-husband and director Peter Bogdanovich's early films; mentoring then first-time director and writer Cameron Crowe, and discovering actors including Cybill Shepherd, Tatum O'Neal, Owen Wilson, Luke Wilson, and director Wes Anderson. Platt also suggested that director James L. Brooks meet artist and illustrator Matt Groening, a meeting that led to their collaboration on The Simpsons.

== Early life ==
Platt was born Mary Marr Platt in Fort Sheridan, Illinois, on January 29, 1939, later choosing to be known as 'Polly'. Her father, John, was a colonel in the Judge Advocate General's Corps of the United States Army, while her mother, Vivian, worked in advertising; she had a brother, John. She moved to Germany at the age of six when her father presided over the Dachau Trials. Platt later returned to the U.S. and attended the Carnegie Institute of Technology, now known as Carnegie Mellon University. Phillip Klein, Platt's husband of eight months in 1960, died in a car accident.

== Career ==
Platt worked in summer stock theatre as a costume designer in New York and there met Peter Bogdanovich, whom she later married. She co-wrote with him his first movie Targets (1968), conceiving the plot outline of a "Vietnam veteran-turned-sniper", and served as production designer on the film. She repeated the latter role on his film The Last Picture Show (1971), having made the original suggestion to adapt Larry McMurtry's novel and having recommended Cybill Shepherd for her first film role therein. Despite the breakdown of her marriage to Bogdanovich, Platt was again production designer on What's Up, Doc? (1972) and Paper Moon (1973). Bogdanovich commented that: "She worked on important pictures and made major contributions. She was unique. There weren't many women doing that kind of work at that time, particularly not one as well versed as she was. She knew all the departments, on a workmanlike basis, as opposed to most producers who just know things in theory." Platt became the first female member of the Art Directors Guild in 1971. She was also production designer on A Star Is Born (1976).

She wrote the screenplay for Pretty Baby (1978), for which she was also an associate producer, as well as Good Luck, Miss Wyckoff (1979), and A Map of the World (1999). She wrote the screenplay for the 1995 Academy Award-winning short film Lieberman in Love, based on a short story by W. P. Kinsella.

Platt worked extensively with James L. Brooks throughout her career. She was the executive vice president of his production company Gracie Films from 1985 to 1995. Platt was nominated for an Academy Award for Best Art Direction for Brooks' film Terms of Endearment (1983). She co-produced many of the films he worked on, which Gracie made, including Broadcast News (1987), The War of the Roses (1989) and Bottle Rocket (1996), as well as producing Say Anything... (1989) in which she also had a bit part.

Platt gave Brooks the nine-panel Life in Hell cartoon, "The Los Angeles Way of Death" by cartoonist Matt Groening. She suggested that the two meet and that Brooks produce an animated TV version of Groening's characters; the meeting spawned a series of short cartoons about the Simpson family, which aired as part of The Tracey Ullman Show and later became The Simpsons.

In 1994, she was awarded the Women in Film Crystal Award. Brooks said that Platt "couldn't walk into a gas station and get gas without mentoring somebody. Movies are a team sport, and she made teams function. She would assume a maternal role in terms of really being there. The film was everything, and ego just didn't exist." In 2003, she appeared in the BBC documentary film Easy Riders, Raging Bulls. Platt was working on a documentary about the filmmaker Roger Corman at the time of her death. She was very involved with the Austin Film Festival up until her death, and mentored many filmmakers through her participation in the annual festival, which is geared toward screenwriting and production skill-sharing. According to her daughter, Antonia Bogdanovich, "She came every year, religiously, she was a huge supporter," of the Austin Film Festival, and Platt attended the very first festival.

== Personal life ==
Platt was married to Philip Klein until his death in a car crash in 1959, eight months after they married, and to director Peter Bogdanovich from 1962 to 1971. They divorced after Bogdanovich left her during the filming of The Last Picture Show for its lead actress Cybill Shepherd. Platt and Bogdanovich had two children: Antonia and Sashy. Platt later married prop maker Tony Wade; they remained married until his death in 1985. She was stepmother to his two children, Kelly and Jon.

The 1984 film Irreconcilable Differences, starring Ryan O'Neal, Shelley Long and Drew Barrymore, was reportedly loosely based on her marriage to Bogdanovich, and their divorce, and Platt herself confirmed the film "got more right than wrong."

Platt's talent as a mentor and film producer was deeply admired by her peers, who felt she should have become a director. She struggled with alcoholism for more than 25 years. Additionally, sexism in the film industry made directing unlikely for her.

Platt participated in a 2000 Texasville reunion of some of the cast and crew of The Last Picture Show. She and Cybill Shepherd had made peace and were on friendly terms. Platt and her children were reconciled with Bogdanovich when she died.

== Death ==
Platt died in Manhattan, on July 27, 2011, from amyotrophic lateral sclerosis, aged 72. She was survived by her brother John "Jack" Platt, her two daughters Antonia Bogdanovich and Sashy Bogdanovich, her son-in-law Pax Wassermann, and three grandchildren.

== Legacy ==
Platt was the first woman to be accepted into the Art Directors Guild, in 1971, a membership she required in order to receive credit on studio films. In May 2020, film journalist and podcast producer/writer/host Karina Longworth began the fifteenth season of the podcast You Must Remember This with a focus on the significance of Polly Platt's work within the larger context of late 20th-century U.S. film history. The season, "Polly Platt, The Invisible Woman", includes interviews with family, friends, and colleagues (as well as readings from Platt's unpublished memoir) documenting her (often uncredited) contributions to commercially and critically successful films of the late 1960s and into the early 2000s. Longworth argues that Platt played a pivotal role in the location, casting, and overall visual aesthetic of major films, including but not limited to Paper Moon, What's Up, Doc? and The Last Picture Show. Actress Maggie Siff voices Platt in the podcast.

== Filmography ==
(Source: IMDB)

Film	Year	Producer	Production Designer	Costume Designer	Writer	Miscellaneous Crew	Art Director	Stunts	Thanks	Notes
The Wild Angels	1966			costume designer (uncredited)				stunt double: Nancy Sinatra (uncredited)		
Voyage to the Planet of Prehistoric Women	1968					production coordinator				
Targets	1968		production designer	costume designer (uncredited)	writer: story					
Target: Harry	1969			costume designer (uncredited)						
The Last Picture Show	1971		design	costume designer (uncredited)						
What's Up, Doc?	1972		production designer	costume designer (uncredited)						
The Thief Who Came to Dinner	1973		production designer	costume designer (uncredited)						
Paper Moon	1973		production designer	costume designer (uncredited)						
Thieves Like Us	1974			costume designer (uncredited)						
The Bad News Bears	1976		production designer							
A Star Is Born	1976		production designer							
Pretty Baby	1978	associate producer			writer: screenplay/story					
Good Luck, Miss Wyckoff	1979				writer: screenplay					
Young Doctors in Love	1982		production designer							
The Man with Two Brains	1983		production designer							
Terms of Endearment	1983		production designer							
Between Two Women	1986	co-producer	production designer							
The Witches of Eastwick	1987		production designer							TV movie
Broadcast News	1987	executive producer								
Big	1988								special thanks	
Say Anything...	1989	producer								
The War of the Roses	1989	executive producer								
Let's Get Mom	1989	producer								TV movie
Texasville	1990								special thanks	
I'll Do Anything	1994	producer								
Lieberman in Love	1995				writer: teleplay					Short
Bottle Rocket	1996	producer								
The Evening Star	1996	producer								
Dogtown	1997								the production wishes to thank	
A Map of the World	1999				writer: screenplay					
Muertas	2007	executive producer								Short
A West Texas Children's Story	2007	executive producer								
Bean	2008								thanks	Short
The Girl in the Picture	2011	executive producer								TV series
Corman's World: Exploits of a Hollywood Rebel	2011	executive producer								Documentary
The Grand Budapest Hotel	2014								special thanks: our old friends	Posthumous
The Other Side of the Wind	2018						art director			Posthumous

=== As actor ===
Film	Year	Role	Notes
Targets	1968	Passer-by at Drive-in	Uncredited
Say Anything...	1989	Mrs Flood	
Sugar Town	1999	Maggie	

=== As herself ===
Film	Year	Notes
Picture This: The Times of Peter Bogdanovich in Archer City, Texas	1991	Documentary
Ben Johnson: Third Cowboy on the Right	1996	Documentary
Getting the Goods on 'As Good As It Gets'	1997	TV movie documentary
Without Lying Down: Frances Marion and the Power of Women in Hollywood	2000	TV movie documentary
E! True Hollywood Story: The O'Neals	2001	TV series documentary
Headliners & Legends with Matt Lauer	2001	Episode: "Brooke Shields"
A Decade Under the Influence	2003	Documentary
Easy Riders, Raging Bulls: How the Sex, Drugs and Rock 'N' Roll Generation Saved Hollywood	2003	Documentary
Women on Top: Hollywood and Power	2003	TV movie documentary
Asking for the Moon	2003	Video documentary short
The Next Picture Show	2003	Video short
The Making of Bottle Rocket	2008	Documentary short
Corman's World: Exploits of a Hollywood Rebel	2011	Documentary
