= Staying Together (film) =

1989 film by Lee Grant

- Directed by: Lee Grant
- Written by: Monte Merrick
- Produced by: Joseph Feury; Milton Justice
- Starring: Sean Astin; Stockard Channing; Melinda Dillon; Levon Helm; Dermot Mulroney; Tim Quill; Daphne Zuniga
- Cinematography: Dick Bush
- Edited by: Katherine Wenning
- Music by: Miles Goodman
- Distributed by: Hemdale Film Corporation
- Release dates: November 10, 1989 (United States); October 1, 1990 (Japan)
- Running time: 91 minutes
- Country: United States
- Language: English
- Budget: $7 million
- Box office: $4,348,025 (U.S.)

Staying Together is a 1989 American comedy-drama film directed by Lee Grant and produced by Joseph Feury (Grant's husband) and Milton Justice. The film stars Sean Astin, Stockard Channing, Melinda Dillon, Levon Helm (of The Band), Dermot Mulroney, Tim Quill, and Daphne Zuniga. Grant's daughter Dinah Manoff makes a brief appearance. Channing and Manoff previously appeared together in Grease, released 11 years earlier. Staying Together was released in the United States on November 10, 1989, and released in Japan on October 1, 1990.

== Plot ==
Three brothers live at home with their parents and work at the family restaurant that has been managed by their father for the past 25 years. The brothers expect one day to take over the restaurant themselves, but one morning their father comes to the realization that he hates working there and he sells the restaurant without consulting the rest of the family. This begins to break apart the family, and one of the brothers, angry with his father's decision, leaves to find another job. The father subsequently dies from a heart attack.

== Cast ==
- Tim Quill as Brian McDermott
- Sean Astin as Duncan McDermott
- Dermot Mulroney as Kit McDermott
- Melinda Dillon as Eileen McDermott, the mother
- Jim Haynie as Jake McDermott, the father and owner of McDermott's Fried Chicken
- Daphne Zuniga as Beverly Young
- Stockard Channing as Nancy Trainer
- Levon Helm as Denny Stockton
- Keith Szarabajka as Kevin Burley
- Sheila Kelley as Beth Harper
- Dinah Manoff as Lois Cook, a waitress at the restaurant
- Ryan Hill as Demetri Harper
- Rick Marshall as Charlie

== Reception ==
Staying Together was released on November 10, 1989 and made $4,348,025 at the U.S. box office in its opening ten days. It was released on VHS in the 1990s and on DVD in 2005. In a retrospective score by review aggregate website Rotten Tomatoes, it has an 80% score, with a weighted average of 5.8/10, based on only 5 reviews indicating "no consensus yet".

== Awards ==
- Lee Grant was nominated for a Critics Award at the Deauville Film Festival in 1990.
- Sean Astin won Best Young Actor Starring in a Motion Picture at the 11th Youth in Film Awards (now Young Artist Awards) in 1990.
