= Lee Grant =

American actress and director (born mid-1920s)

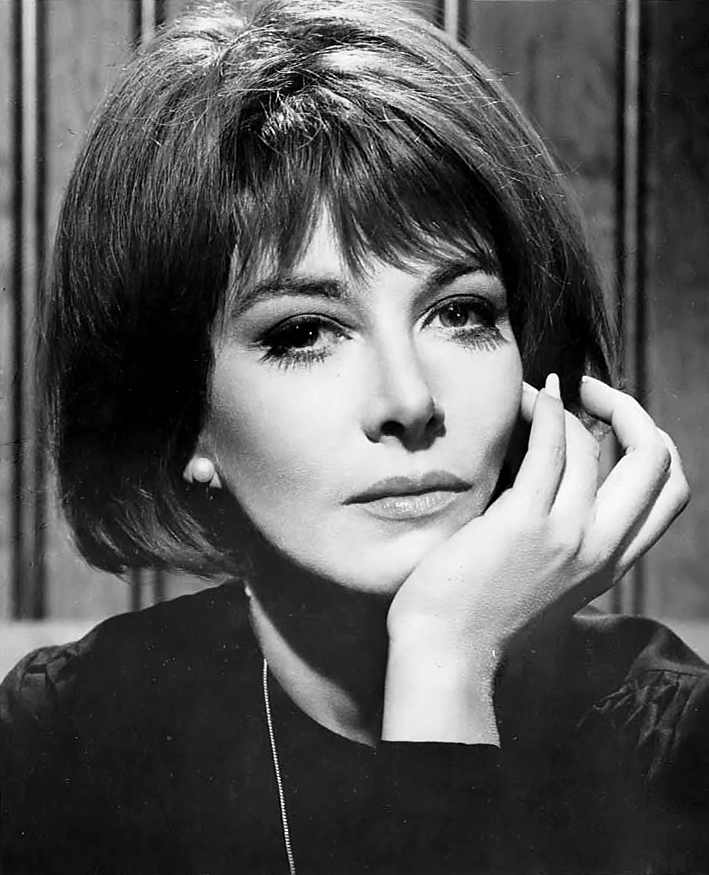
- Grant in 1967
- Born: Lyova Haskell Rosenthal; October 31, during the mid-1920s (Note: Grant was born on October 31, but disagreement exists between sources over the year. While secondary and tertiary sources put Grant's year of birth between 1925 and 1931, she was almost certainly born in the mid-1920s. Public records indicate she was born in 1925 but a ship manifest and congressional testimony favor 1926. Recent interviews with Grant and her autobiography suggest 1925, 1926 or 1927, although Grant herself is inconsistent on the subject. Secondary sources: Mid-1920s: The San Francisco Chronicle notes that Grant is "famously inexact" about her age, as a result of being blacklisted.; 1925: Encyclopædia Britannica used to have Grant's date of birth listed as October 31, 1927, but it has since updated the year to 1925.; 1925: In a list of the 25 oldest living film directors, the British Film Institute states that she was born on 31 October 1925.; 1925: WTOP-FM wrote that Grant was born in 1925 and would be 90 in October 2015.; 1926: In an interview in 2017, the Los Angeles Times noted that the actress "turns 91 this year" and that "Grant's legendary caginess about her age has long drawn jokes".; 1926–1930, 1931: Who's Who in America lists 1931 as Grant's birth year, but Great Jews in the Performing Arts notes that "Other sources give every year from 1926 through 1930."; 1927: While interviewing Grant, Gilbert Gottfried put her age at 24 at the time of her Oscar nomination and Cannes win. These events occurred in April/May 1952, which would date the year of her birth to 1927 using the October 31 date.; 1928, 1929, 1931: Current Biography Yearbook gives the day and month as October 31, but notes different sources give 1928, 1929 and 1931 as the year of birth.; Primary sources: 1925: New York City birth indexes indicate that a Lyova Rosenthal was born in the Bronx on October 31, 1925.; 1925: United States Public Records (under the name Lee Grant Manoff) give Grant's date of birth as October 31, 1925.; 1925: Census records indicate that Grant—under her birth name of Lyova Haskell Rosenthal—was aged 4 at the 1930 census, and 14 at the 1940 census.; 1925/1926: In a video interview published by X17 Online on April 11, 2017, Grant said she was 90 years old and born in 1925. However, her age would date her year of birth to 1926.; 1925/1926: A July 1933 shipping manifest puts Grant's age at 7 years of age, and the year of birth 1926.; 1926: In an interview published in September 2023, Grant gave her age as "97 and a half". If the interview occurred shortly before it was published, this would place her date of birth in early 1926.; 1926: Grant gave her date of birth as October 31, 1926, in testimony to the House Un-American Activities Committee.; 1927: In her autobiography, I Said Yes to Everything (2014), Grant states she was twenty-four years old when she received her first Oscar nomination at the 24th Academy Awards, held in March 1952, and when she won at the 1952 Cannes Film Festival (held in April/May 1952). Grant reiterated this claim in an interview with Robert Osborne of Turner Classic Movies in 2014.) (age 99–101); New York City, U.S.
- Education: Neighborhood Playhouse School of the Theatre; Actors Studio
- Occupations: Actress; director
- Years active: 1931–present
- Spouses: Arnold Manoff (m. 1951; div. 1960) Joseph Feury (m. 1970)
- Children: 2, including Dinah Manoff

Lee Grant (born Lyova Haskell Rosenthal; October 31, during the mid-1920s) is an American actress, documentarian, and director. In a career spanning over eight decades, she won an Academy Award, two Primetime Emmy Awards, and a Directors Guild of America Award, in addition to nominations for five Golden Globe Awards. She is one of the last surviving actors of the Hollywood blacklist era.

Having begun her career as a child performing in stage ballet, Grant rose to prominence as an adult on Broadway, making her debut in Detective Story (1949) as the Shoplifter. She reprised the role in the film adaptation (1951), earning an Academy Award nomination for Best Supporting Actress and winning the Cannes Film Festival Award for Best Actress. Her career was interrupted when she was blacklisted for 12 years after refusing to testify before the House Un-American Activities Committee. During this period, she worked as an acting teacher and took minor television and theater roles under pseudonyms.

Grant returned to prominence with her role in the television series Peyton Place (1965–1966), winning the Primetime Emmy Award for Outstanding Performance by an Actress in a Supporting Role in a Drama Series. She appeared in supporting roles in In the Heat of the Night, Valley of the Dolls (both 1967), and The Landlord (1970), receiving Academy Award nominations for the latter, as well as Shampoo (1975) and Voyage of the Damned (1976), winning for Shampoo.

Grant transitioned to directing in the 1980s, focusing on documentaries and television films. She won the Directors Guild of America Award for Nobody’s Child (1986) while her film Down and Out in America (1986) tied for the Academy Award for Best Documentary Feature, making her the only Academy Award-winning actor to direct an Academy Award-winning documentary. She continued directing into the 2000s while occasionally making acting appearances.

== Early life ==
Lee Grant was born Lyova Haskell Rosenthal in Manhattan, the only child of Witia (née Haskell), a child care worker, and Abraham W. Rosenthal, a realtor and educator. Her father was born in New York City, to Polish Jewish immigrants, and her mother was a Russian Jewish immigrant who, along with her sister Fremo, left Odessa to escape the pogroms. The family resided at 148th Street and Riverside Drive in the Hamilton Heights neighborhood of Manhattan.

Her birthday is October 31, but the year is disputed, with all years ranging from 1925 to 1931 having been given as her year of birth at some point; however, census data, travel manifests, and testimony suggest that she was born in 1925 or 1926, while Grant's stated ages at the time of her professional debut and Oscar nomination indicate she was born in 1927.

Grant made her stage debut in L'Oracolo at the Metropolitan Opera in 1931 and later joined the American Ballet as an adolescent. She attended Art Students League of New York, Juilliard School of Music, The High School of Music & Art, and George Washington High School, all in New York City. Grant graduated from high school and won a scholarship to the Neighborhood Playhouse School of the Theatre, where she studied under Sanford Meisner. Grant undertook further study with Uta Hagen at the HB Studio. She later enrolled in the Actors Studio in New York.

== Career ==
=== 1930s–1950s ===
Grant had her first stage ballet performance in 1933 at the Metropolitan Opera House. In 1938, in her early teens, she was made a member of the American Ballet under George Balanchine. As an actress, Grant had her professional stage debut as understudy in Oklahoma! in 1944. In 1948, she had her Broadway acting debut in Joy to the World. Grant established herself as a dramatic method actress on and off Broadway, earning praise for her first major role as a shoplifter in Detective Story in 1949.

Grant made her film debut two years later in the 1951 film version (Detective Story), starring Kirk Douglas, receiving her first Academy Award for Best Supporting Actress nomination, and winning the Best Actress Award at the Cannes Film Festival. She said she enjoyed working under director William Wyler, who helped guide her.

But as quickly as that dream unfolded, her life soon turned into a nightmare... So right when her career should have been blooming, she was banned from working in Hollywood. And that ban lasted for twelve years, a lifetime for an actor.

— Robert Osborne, Turner Classic Movies interview

In 1951, she gave an impassioned eulogy at the memorial service for actor J. Edward Bromberg, whose early death, she implied, was caused by the stress of being called before the House Un-American Activities Committee (HUAC). Her name soon after appeared in the publication Red Channels, and as a result, for the next twelve years, her "prime years" as she put it, she was blacklisted and her work in television and movies was limited.

Kirk Douglas, who acted with her in Detective Story, recalled that director Edward Dmytryk, a blacklistee, had first named her husband at the HUAC:

Lee was only a kid, a beautiful young girl with extraordinary talent and a big future. You could see it. She was so good that she earned a Best Supporting Actress nomination for her very first film role. But because Eddie Dmytryk named her husband, Lee Grant was blacklisted before her film career even had a chance to begin. Of course, she refused to testify about the man to whom she was married, and it took years before anyone would hire her for another picture.

Grant appeared in a number of plays, two feature films, and in a few small television roles during her blacklisted years. In 1953, she played Rose Peabody in the soap opera Search for Tomorrow, had featured supporting roles in the film dramas Storm Fear in 1955, and Middle of the Night in 1959. On stage, Grant starred in the Broadway production of Two for the Seesaw. In 1959, she succeeded Anne Bancroft in the lead female role. That same year, she had a supporting role in the romantic drama Middle of the Night.

=== 1960s ===
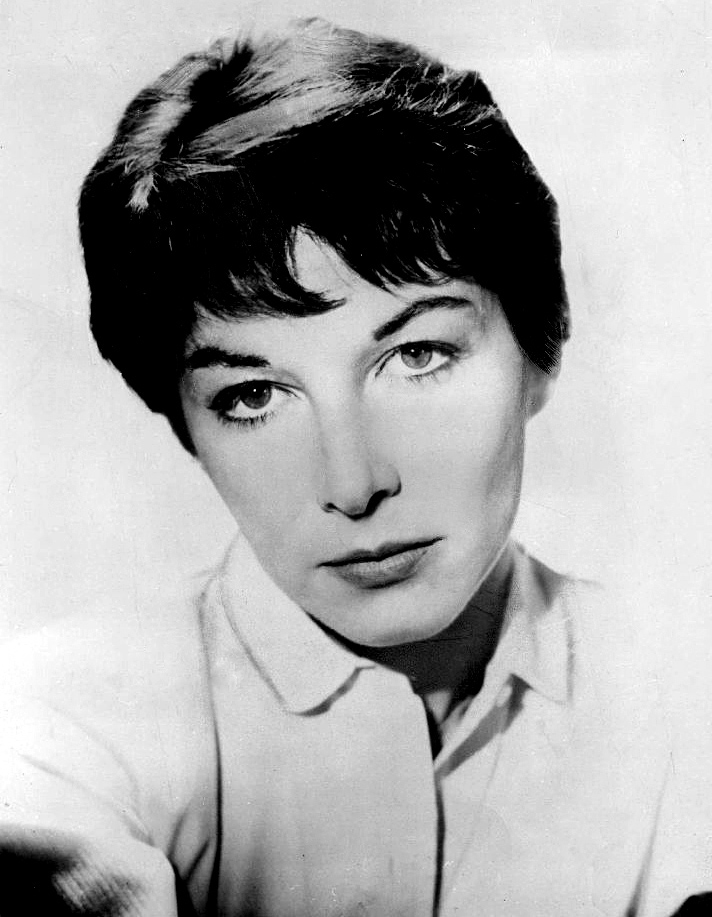
Grant in 1961

By the time Grant's name was removed from the blacklist in the mid-1960s, she was the divorced mother of a daughter, Dinah. Grant began re-establishing her television and movie career. In her autobiography, she writes:

Dinah was my grail, my constant; nothing and no one could get between us. Dinah and my need to support her financially, morally, viscerally, and my rage at those who had taken twelve working, acting years from my life, were what motivated me.

Her experience with the blacklist scarred her to such an extent that as late as 2002, she would freeze and go into a "near trance" when anyone asked her about her experiences during the McCarthy period.

Grant's first major achievement, after HUAC officially cleared her, was in the 1960s television series Peyton Place as Stella Chernak, for which she won an Emmy in 1966. In 1963, she won acclaim for her stage performance in the off-Broadway production of Jean Genet's The Maids. In 1967, she played the distraught widow of a murder victim in the Oscar-winning In the Heat of the Night. In 1968, Grant appeared in an episode of Mission Impossible, portraying the wife of a U.S. diplomat who goes undercover to discredit a rogue diplomat. In 1969, she had supporting roles in the crime drama The Big Bounce and science fiction drama Marooned.

=== 1970s ===
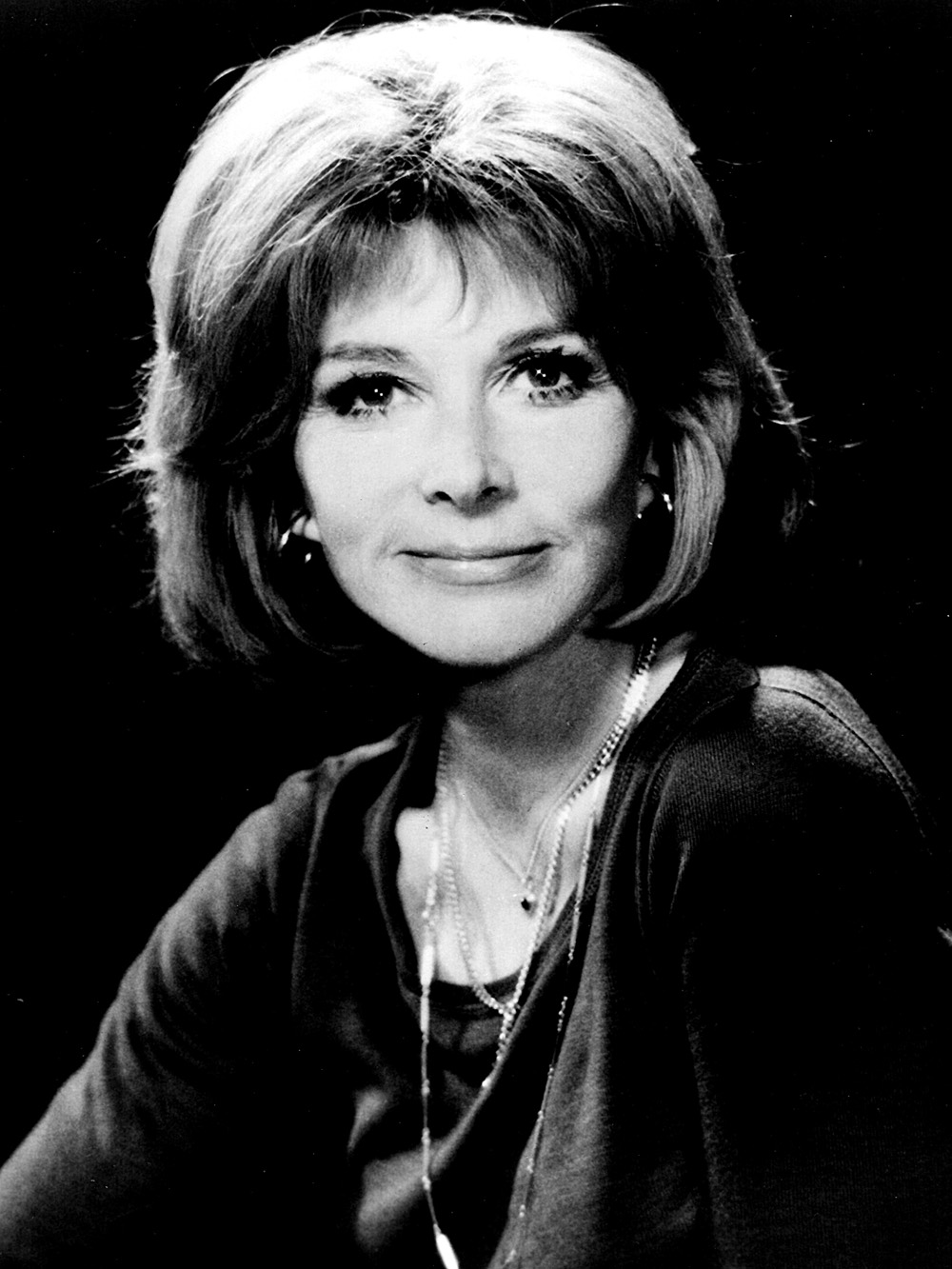
Grant in 1975

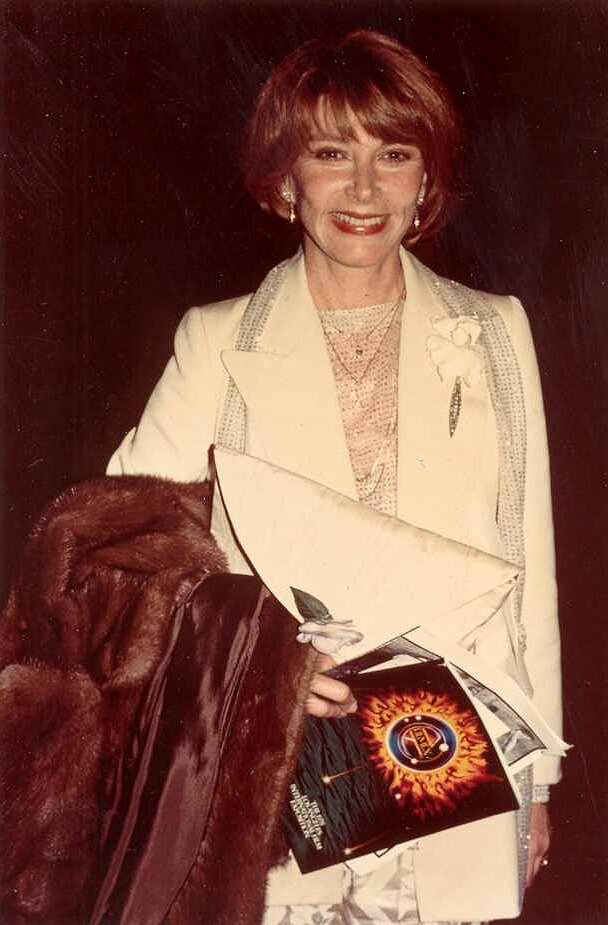
Grant at the premiere of F.I.S.T. (April 1978)

Grant received three Academy Award nominations in the 1970s for The Landlord (1970), Shampoo (1975), and Voyage of the Damned (1976). In Plaza Suite (1971), a successful comedy directed by Arthur Hiller and written by Neil Simon, she played the harried mother of a bride, with Walter Matthau as the father.

In March 1971, Grant played the murderer in the Columbo pilot episode "Ransom for a Dead Man", playing opposite Peter Falk's Lieutenant Columbo. For that role, she was nominated for an Emmy as Outstanding Lead Actress – Miniseries or a Movie. That same year, she also received a second Emmy nomination in the same category of Outstanding Single Performance by an Actress in a Leading Role for her performance in the television film The Neon Ceiling, which she won.

Grant reunited with Peter Falk on Broadway in the original production of The Prisoner of Second Avenue, written by Neil Simon; the playwright said that his "first and only choice" for the part was Grant, who he said was equally at home with dramatists such as Chekhov or Sidney Kingsley, yet could also be "hilariously funny" when the script called for it, for she was able to portray essential honesty in her acting.

Grant won an Oscar for Best Supporting Actress playing Warren Beatty's older lover in Shampoo (1975). The film was Columbia's biggest hit in the studio's 50-year history. Shampoo was the second film in which Grant acted under director Hal Ashby. Critic Pauline Kael, comparing her in both films, noted Grant "is such a cool-style comedienne that she's in danger of having people say that she's good, as usual." During the filming, however, she did have some serious disagreements with Beatty, who was also the producer, and nearly quit. During one scene, she wanted to play it in a way she felt was more realistic from a woman's perspective, but Beatty disagreed. After thinking about the scene for a few days, she told director Ashby that she could not do it Beatty's way and was quitting. As she was walking out, Beatty stopped her, and asked what was wrong. "I sat down and told him," she said. "He threw up his hands and said, 'Play it your way. What do I know? I'm a man.'"

Despite the success of the film and her career, Grant was feeling less secure in Hollywood, as she was then around 50 years old. She writes:

I was becoming my own worst enemy as an actor, traumatized onstage and fixated on staying young so I could keep working in film. A woman of a certain age does not play in movies or TV; we're kicked to the side or out. And I was a woman of a certain age, terrified I'd be found out and unemployed again.

During the 1975-76 television season, she starred in the sitcom Fay, which, to her chagrin, was canceled after eight episodes. In 1977, she starred in the ensemble disaster movie Airport '77 and in 1978, she was the lead actress in the horror film Damien - Omen II, also starring William Holden. Both films drew negative reviews, though they were financially successful. She made a guest appearance in Empty Nest, in which her daughter Dinah Manoff co-starred.

In the late 1970s, Grant was asked by the American Film Institute to participate in the first AFI Directing Workshop for Women. During the workshop, Grant successfully moved into directing when she adapted the play The Stronger in 1976, written by August Strindberg.

=== 1980s–1990s ===
In 1980, Grant directed her first feature film, Tell Me a Riddle, a story about an aging Jewish couple. That debut narrative film was followed by a widely distributed documentary film titled The Willmar 8, which profiled eight female employees of a bank in Willmar, Minnesota who went on strike to protest pay inequities between male and female bank tellers. Grant went on to direct many documentaries on a variety of social issues: women in prison with When Women Kill (1983), transgender individuals with What Sex Am I? (1985), women experiencing domestic abuse with Battered (1989), and women trying to keep custody of their children in court in Women on Trial (1992).

In 1986, Grant directed Down and Out in America (1986) which won the Academy Award for Documentary Feature. The film was about farm workers losing their farms, homelessness, and unemployment in America. The same year, she directed Nobody's Child, a television movie starring Marlo Thomas about a woman confined to a mental institution for 20 years. Grant became the first female director to win the Directors Guild of America Award.

She starred in an HBO remake of Plaza Suite in 1982, co-starring with Jerry Orbach, both playing three different characters in three acts. It was filmed before a live audience. Actor Bruce Dern, who acted with her in The Big Town (1987), recalls working with her: "Lee Grant is a fabulous actress. Anytime she works it's a blessing you have her in your movie."

In 1988, she was awarded the Women in Film Crystal Award for outstanding women who through their endurance and the excellence of their work have helped to expand the role of women within the entertainment industry.

Admiring her directing and acting skill, actress Sissy Spacek agreed to act in the romantic comedy Hard Promises (1991) "only to work with Grant", although Grant was later replaced as its director. In 1992, Grant played Dora Cohn, the mother of Roy Cohn in the biographical made-for-TV film Citizen Cohn, which garnered her another Primetime Emmy Award nomination. In 1994, she directed the television film Seasons of the Heart, starring Carol Burnett and George Segal.

=== 2000s–present ===
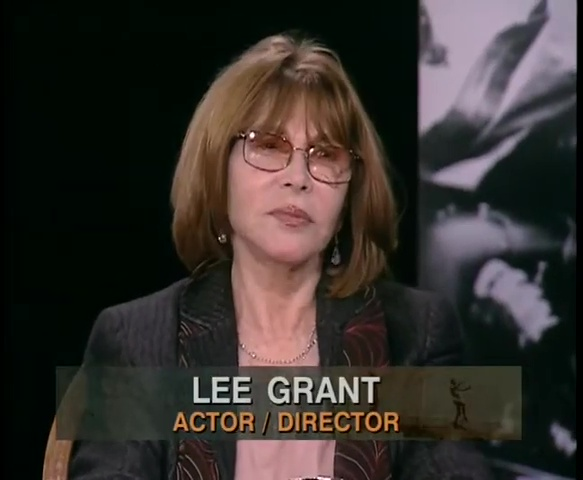
Grant on CUNY TV's City Cinematheque, 2006

In 2001, Lee Grant portrayed Louise Bonner in David Lynch's Mulholland Drive. From 2004 to 2007, Carlin Glynn, Stephen Lang, and Grant served as co-artistic directors for the Actors Studio. In the early 2000s, Grant directed a series of Intimate Portrait episodes for Lifetime Television, that celebrated a diverse range of accomplished women.

In 2013, Grant briefly returned to the stage, after a nearly forty-year absence, to star in one performance of The Gin Game, part of a benefit for improvement programs at the Island Music Guild, in Bainbridge Island, Washington. Grant played Fonsia Dorsey opposite Frank Buxton as Weller Martin; her daughter Dinah Manoff directed the production.

After a fourteen-year hiatus, Lee Grant played a small part in the film Killian & the Comeback Kids (2020), directed by Taylor A. Purdee.

Grant's career making documentaries in the 1980s and 1990s was honored with an appearance on the American Film Institute's AFI Docs at its Guggenheim Symposium and with a program, "20th Century Woman: The Documentary Films of Lee Grant", on AFI Silver and other virtual cinemas in mid-2020. This became the first virtual repertory film series in America.

As of 2022, she is still the only Academy Award-winning actor to also direct an Academy Award-winning documentary.

In January 2024, she attended the New York Film Festival, where the first two films she directed were shown in the revivals program, and talked about her directing career in a panel hosted by Turner Classic Movies.

== Filmography ==
=== Actress ===
Year	Film	Role	Notes
1951	Detective Story	Shoplifter	
1953–1954	Search for Tomorrow	Rose Peabody #1	
1955	Storm Fear	Edna Rogers	
1959	Middle of the Night	Marilyn	
1963	The Balcony	Carmen	
1963	An Affair of the Skin	Katherine McCleod	
1964	Pie in the Sky	Suzy	Filmed in 1962, released 1964. Retitled "Terror in the City".
1964	The Fugitive	Millie Hallop	Episode: "Taps for a Dead War"
1965–1966	Peyton Place	Stella Chernak	71 episodes (August 19, 1965 – March 28, 1966)
1967	Divorce American Style	Dede Murphy	
1967	In the Heat of the Night	Mrs. Leslie Colbert	
1967	Valley of the Dolls	Miriam	
1967	The Big Valley	Rosemary Williams	Episode: "The Lady from Mesa"
1968	Buona Sera, Mrs. Campbell	Fritzie Braddock	
1968	Judd, for the Defense	Kay Gould	
1969	The Big Bounce	Joanne	
1969	Marooned	Celia Pruett	
1970	The Landlord	Joyce Enders	
1970	There Was a Crooked Man...	Mrs. Bullard	
1970	Night Slaves	Marjorie Howard	TV film
1971	Columbo	Leslie Williams	Episode: "Ransom for a Dead Man"
1971	The Neon Ceiling	Carrie Miller	TV film
1971	The Last Generation		archive footage
1971	Plaza Suite	Norma Hubley	
1972	Portnoy's Complaint	Sophie Portnoy	
1972	Lieutenant Schuster's Wife	Ellie Schuster	TV film
1973	What Are Best Friends For?	Adele Ross	TV film
1973	The Shape of Things	Performer (and co-director)	
1974	The Internecine Project	Jean Robertson	
1975	Shampoo	Felicia Karpf	
1975–1976	Fay	Fay Stewart	Lead role — 10 episodes
1976	Voyage of the Damned	Lillian Rosen	
1977	Airport '77	Karen Wallace	
1977	The Spell	Marilyn Matchett	TV film
1978	Damien – Omen II	Ann Thorn	
1978	The Swarm	Anne MacGregor	
1978	The Mafu Cage	Ellen	
1979	Backstairs at the White House	Grace Coolidge	TV miniseries
1979	When You Comin' Back, Red Ryder?	Clarisse Ethridge	
1980	Little Miss Marker	The Judge	
1981	Charlie Chan and the Curse of the Dragon Queen	Mrs. Lupowitz	
1981	The Million Dollar Face	Evalyna	TV film
1981	For Ladies Only	Anne Holt	TV film
1982	Thou Shalt Not Kill	Maxine Lochman	TV film
1982	Visiting Hours	Deborah Ballin	
1982	Bare Essence	Ava Marshall	TV film
1984	Billions for Boris	Sascha Harris	
1984	Teachers	Dr. Donna Burke	
1985	Sanford Meisner: The American Theatre's Best Kept Secret	Herself	Documentary
1987	The Big Town	Ferguson Edwards	
1990	She Said No	D.A. Doris Cantore	TV film
1991	Defending Your Life	Lena Foster	
1992	Something to Live for: The Alison Gertz Story	Carol Gertz	TV film
1992	Earth and the American Dream	Narrator	
1992	Citizen Cohn	Dora Marcus Cohn	
1996	It's My Party	Amalia Stark	
1996	The Substance of Fire	Cora Cahn	
1996	Under Heat	Jane	
2000	Dr. T & the Women	Dr. Harper	
2000	The Amati Girls	Aunt Spendora	
2001	Mulholland Drive	Louise Bonner	
2005	The Needs of Kim Stanley	Herself	
2005	Going Shopping	Winnie	
2020	Killian & the Comeback Kids	Ms. Hunter (Voice)	

=== Director ===
Year	Production	Notes
1973	The Shape of Things	TV special
1975	For the Use of the Hall	TV film
1976	The Stronger	Short film
1980	Tell Me a Riddle	Feature film
1981	The Willmar 8	Documentary film
1983	When Women Kill	Documentary film (also narrator)
1984	A Matter of Sex	TV film
1985	What Sex Am I?	Documentary film (also narrator)
1985	ABC Afterschool Special	Episode: "Cindy Eller: A Modern Fairy Tale"
1986	Nobody's Child	TV film
1986	Down and Out in America	Documentary film (also narrator)
1989	Battered	Documentary film (also narrator)
1989	Staying Together	Feature film
1989	No Place Like Home	TV film
1992	Women on Trial	Documentary film (also narrator)
1994	Seasons of the Heart	TV film
1994	Following Her Heart	TV film
1994	Reunion	TV film
1997	Say It, Fight It, Cure It	TV film
1997	Broadway Brawler	unfinished film
1999	Confronting the Crisis: Childcare in America	TV film
2000	American Masters	Episode: "Sidney Poitier: One Bright Light"
2000	The Loretta Claiborne Story	TV film
2001	The Gun Deadlock	TV film
2004	Biography	Episode: "Melanie Griffith"
2000–2004	Intimate Portrait	43 episodes
2005	... A Father... A Son... Once Upon a Time in Hollywood	TV film

== Awards and nominations ==
Year	Award	Category	Nominated work	Results	Ref.
1951	Academy Awards	Best Supporting Actress	Detective Story	Nominated	
1970	Academy Awards	Best Supporting Actress	The Landlord	Nominated	
1975	Academy Awards	Best Supporting Actress	Shampoo	Won	
1976	Academy Awards	Best Supporting Actress	Voyage of the Damned	Nominated	
1993	CableACE Awards	Public Affairs Special or Series	Women on Trial	Nominated	
1952	Cannes Film Festival	Best Actress	Detective Story	Won	
1986	Directors Guild of America Awards	Outstanding Directorial Achievement in Dramatic Specials	Nobody's Child	Won	
1984	Drama Desk Awards	Outstanding Director of a Play	A Private View	Nominated	
1951	Golden Globe Awards	Best Supporting Actress – Motion Picture	Detective Story	Nominated	
1967	Golden Globe Awards	Best Supporting Actress – Motion Picture	In the Heat of the Night	Nominated	
1970	Golden Globe Awards	Best Supporting Actress – Motion Picture	The Landlord	Nominated	
1975	Golden Globe Awards	Best Supporting Actress – Motion Picture	Shampoo	Nominated	
1976	Golden Globe Awards	Best Supporting Actress – Motion Picture	Voyage of the Damned	Nominated	
1997	Hamptons International Film Festival	Lifetime Achievement Award	—N/a	Won	
2004	New York Women in Film & Television	Muse Award	—N/a	Won	
1964	Obie Awards	Distinguished Performance by an Actress	The Maids	Won	
1966	Primetime Emmy Awards	Outstanding Performance by an Actress in a Supporting Role in a Drama	Peyton Place	Won	
1969	Primetime Emmy Awards	Outstanding Single Performance by an Actress in a Leading Role	Judd, for the Defense (Episode: "The Gates of Cerberus")	Nominated	
1971	Primetime Emmy Awards	Outstanding Single Performance by an Actress in a Leading Role	Columbo (Episode: "Ransom for a Dead Man")	Nominated	
1971	Primetime Emmy Awards	Outstanding Single Performance by an Actress in a Leading Role	The Neon Ceiling	Won	
1974	Primetime Emmy Awards	Best Supporting Actress in Comedy-Variety, Variety or Music	The Shape of Things	Nominated	
1976	Primetime Emmy Awards	Outstanding Lead Actress in a Comedy Series	Fay	Nominated	
1993	Primetime Emmy Awards	Outstanding Supporting Actress in a Miniseries or a Special	Citizen Cohn	Nominated	
2021	RiverRun International Film Festival	Master of Cinema Award	—N/a	Won	
2015	San Francisco Jewish Film Festival	Freedom of Expression Award	—N/a	Won	
1981	Valladolid International Film Festival	Golden Spike	Tell Me a Riddle	Nominated	
1988	Women in Film Crystal + Lucy Awards	Crystal Award for Advocacy Retrospective	—N/a	Won	

== Notes ==
Preceded by Estelle Parsons; Vacant (2003–2004)	Artistic Director of the Actors Studio; 2004–2007; With: Carlin Glynn; Stephen Lang (2004–2006)	Succeeded by Ellen Burstyn
