= Geri Ashur =

American film editor, screenwriter, foreign language dubbing specialist, and filmmaker

- Born: November 27, 1946
- Died: July 22, 1984 (aged 37)
- Education: Barnard College
- Known for: Filmmaker

Geri Ashur (November 27, 1946 - July 22, 1984) was an American film editor, screenwriter, foreign language dubbing specialist, and filmmaker.

== Early life and education ==
Geraldine Ashur was born and raised in Jersey City, New Jersey. She attended Jersey Academy for four years in the early 1960s. A progressive private High School, many of the faculty members had been blacklisted during the earlier 1950s red-baiting era for suspected Communist leanings or membership in the party, and had been given employment by the progenitor of the school, Robert Lustgarten, a wealthy stockbroker with left-liberal leanings. Numerous faculty members, from historians and literary scholars to actively practicing and published poets, held an internationalist and cosmopolitan worldview they shared with the students, that included French Symbolist, 20th-century German and Russian poetry, Whitman and Hart Crane, European Classical music, and in particular foreign films - which included the masterpieces of the Italian neo-realists, Satyajit Ray, Fellini, Antonioni, Bergman, Andrzej Wajda and Akira Kurosawa among others, influencing Ashur and other of the students as well including her contemporary Maury Yeston. Ashur also studied painting at New York's Art Students League during that time. She graduated from Barnard College in 1968.

== Career ==
Ashur began making films with the New York Newsreel, a political collective.

From 1974 to 1982 Ashur specialized as a dubbing editor, working on such films as Ingmar Bergman's ''Autumn Sonata,'' Bernardo Bertolucci's ''1900,'' Francois Truffaut's ''The Last Metro'' and Lina Wertmüller's ''Seven Beauties.''

Ashur directed the documentary Janie’s Janie (1971), which uses a more personal approach, following one woman’s journey to self-determination, or as Janie says, “First I was my father’s Janie, then I was my Charlie’s Janie, now I’m Janie’s Janie.”

Ashur also directed Me and Stella (1975), a portrait of the American blues and folk musician, Elizabeth Cotten.

She lived in Manhattan and died of lung cancer in 1984 at the age of 37, survived by her husband, Richard Brick, and her son, Noah.
