= The Four Diamonds =

Short story and 1995 television film directed by Peter Werner

"The Four Diamonds" is a fantasy themed, allegorical short story written by Chris Millard in 1972 shortly before succumbing to cancer at the age of 14. After returning from summer vacation, his teacher told Chris's class to write a story about what they did during their vacation. Chris had spent the summer being treated for his illness, and asked his teacher if he could write something else, to which she agreed. He wrote about the adventures and struggle of an aspiring knight, also named Millard, to conquer Raptenahad (a play on "rhabdomyosarcoma", the cancer Chris had), a magic-wielding evil queen who symbolized his illness. To defeat her, the story's Millard has to complete four difficult tasks.

The story gave its name to the Four Diamonds Fund, a childhood cancer-centered charitable organization established in 1972 by Chris's parents Charles and Irma. In 1995, the story was also turned into a Disney TV movie directed by Peter Werner.

== Story ==
The story relates the quest of teenage squire Millard to prove his knighthood for King Arthur preliminary to questing for the Holy Grail. Millard decides to do this by ridding a distant land of the evil sorceress Raptenahad and liberate it of her many curses. Once captured by Raptenahad, the young hero attempts repeatedly to regain his freedom and vanquish her. The witch begins to admire her captive for his courage, and offers Millard to try and collect the Diamonus Quadrus (the Four Diamonds) of Courage, Wisdom, Honesty and Strength in order to defeat her (these were virtues Chris believed were necessary in the battle against cancer). If Millard accomplished every difficult task she assigned him, he would be freed and her reign would end forever. Eventually, his continued success enrages Raptenahad and, fearing for her life, she determines to destroy him on his final challenge, however he manages to overcome all obstacles and completes it too. With the sorceress being no more, and her curses lifted, the knight takes over her former castle as his own palace and the story of Sir Millard begins.

== Film adaptation ==
The Four Diamonds
- Genre: Fantasy; Drama; Family
- Screenplay by: Todd Robinson
- Story by: Christopher Millard
- Directed by: Peter Werner
- Starring: Tom Guiry; Christine Lahti; Kevin Dunn; Jayne Brook
- Music by: Phil Marshall
- Country of origin: United States
- Original language: English

Production
- Producers: Joe Byrne; Jean Higgins; Jeb Rosebrook
- Cinematography: Neil Roach
- Editor: Corky Ehlers
- Running time: 96 minutes
- Production companies: Walt Disney Television; O'Byrne Productions

Original release
- Release: August 12, 1995

The Four Diamonds television film, written by Todd Robinson and directed by Peter Werner, was broadcast on August 12, 1995, starring Tom Guiry as Chris Millard and Squire Millard, Christine Lahti co-starred as Chris' doctor and the sorceress Queen Raptenahad, Kevin Dunn as Charles Millard and the wizard Charles the Mysterious, and Jayne Brook as Irma Millard and Hermit of the Lagoon. The film weaves the stages of Millard's real life with Arthurian parallels in the story.

== See also ==
- Four Diamonds Fund
- Penn State IFC/Panhellenic Dance Marathon
