= Willmar 8 =

Women who went on strike in 1977 over sex discrimination

The Willmar 8 picketing Citizens National

The Willmar 8 were eight female employees of the Citizens National Bank in Willmar, Minnesota, USA who went on strike on December 16, 1977 over charges of sex discrimination. The tellers and bookkeepers were protesting unequal pay and unequal opportunities for advancement.

The eight women who went on strike were Doris Boshart, Irene Wallin, Sylvia Erickson Koll, Jane Harguth Groothuis, Sandi Treml, Teren Novotny, Shirley Solyntjes, and Glennis Ter Wisscha.

== Description ==
The Equal Pay Act of 1963 guaranteed the right to equal pay, although unequal pay remained common. At the Citizens National Bank of Willmar in Kandiyohi County, women employees made nearly 300 dollars less per week than their male equivalents, and were expected to work overtime without pay. In April of 1977, the women were instructed to train a young male employee who was hired at a better wage and would become their supervisor -- a position for which the women were not allowed to apply. They took the issue to the bank president, Leo Pirsch, who responded "We're not all equal, you know."

The eight women filed a complaint with the Equal Employment Opportunity Commission (EEOC) and filed an unfair labor practice charge with the National Labor Relations Board. In May 1977, they formed Minnesota's first bank union, Willmar Bank Employees Association Local 1. The EEOC ruled that there was 'reasonable cause to believe' that the bank had engaged in gender discrimination, and the board of directors agreed to negotiations, which soon failed.

On December 16, 1977, the eight women set up a picket line outside the bank when the wind chill was -70°F (-57 °C). One other employee, Lois Johnson, quit just before the strike began.

The Willmar 8 themselves reported to the AFSCME Council 5 Local 404 that they thought the strike could have been averted. However, the strike continued until the summer of 1978. The Willmar 8 dropped their discrimination lawsuit in exchange for financial settlement, offering to return to employment. Boshart was the only striker who immediately returned to work, and was demoted from head bookkeeper to teller.

In the summer of 1979, E. Dorian Gadsden of the National Labor Relations Board issued a ruling on the complaint. The NLRB declared that the bank was guilty of unfair labor practices, but those practices did not cause the strike. The NLRB ruled that the strike was "economic". As a result there was no back pay and no guarantee of the women recovering their jobs.

== Response ==
In Willmar, five female employees remained with the bank. Some businesses blacklisted the Willmar 8. Asa Wilson wrote, "The women's strike caused stress for many in the Western Minnesota town of 14,000 people. Few outwardly showed support for the strike and the lawyer who took the women's case, John Mack, lost his position as county chair of the Republican Party."

From outside Willmar, women's and labor groups as well as private individuals supported the strike in various ways. Many in the women's movement celebrated the strike, leading the Willmar 8 to appear in national coverage. The National Organization for Women sent supporters to join the strikers on the picket line. More than 250 individuals joined the United Automobile Workers at a rally in support.

They appeared on Phil Donahue's talk show and NBC's "Today Show." A documentary was made by Lee Grant, and NBC made a TV movie.

The bank saw a severe drop in deposits, and was sold twice at the end of the 1970s. In 1980, four of the women had returned to work at the bank, though three quickly moved on.

== Legacy ==
The story of the Willmar 8 is taught in schools in Minnesota. Rhoda R. Gilman, the author of The Story of Minnesota's Past observed that "across Minnesota and elsewhere, banks quietly began to make some changes."

In 1981 Lee Grant directed a documentary on the Willmar 8 entitled The Willmar 8. A 1984 docudrama, A Matter of Sex, also directed by Lee Grant, was based on events related to the strike. In 2024, a new documentary by Pioneer PBS called "8 Women Together Alone" was released.
