= Nobody's Child (1986 film) =

- Genre: Drama
- Written by: Mary Gallagher; Ara Watson
- Directed by: Lee Grant
- Starring: Marlo Thomas; Ray Baker; Caroline Kava; Kathy Baker
- Theme music composer: Michael Small
- Country of origin: United States
- Original language: English

Production
- Executive producer: Dyson Lovell
- Producer: Joseph Feury
- Production location: Vancouver
- Cinematography: Sven Nykvist
- Editor: Alan Heim
- Running time: 100 min.
- Production company: Gaylord Productions

Original release
- Network: CBS
- Release: April 6, 1986

Nobody's Child is a 1986 American made-for-television drama film directed by Lee Grant which won a Directors Guild of America Award. It is based on the autobiographical account of the same title by Marie Balter who was sent to a mental institution aged sixteen, with a script adapted by writers Mary Gallagher and Ara Watson. The cast includes Marlo Thomas, Ray Baker, Caroline Kava, and Anna Maria Horsford.

At the 38th Primetime Emmy Awards, Marlo Thomas was awarded the Outstanding Lead Actress in a Miniseries or Special for her role as Marie Balter in this film.
