= Joseph Feury =

US stage dancer, film producer, documentary film maker, painter and actor

Joseph Feury (born 1939; Joseph Fioretti) is an American film and television producer, documentary filmmaker, painter, actor, stage dancer, and Academy Award winner. He is the husband of Academy Award winning actress/director Lee Grant and step-father to Tony Award winner Dinah Manoff. He and Grant are the parents of Belinda Fioretti.

== Life and work ==
Joseph Fioretti grew up in the Little Italy neighborhood of Wilmington, Delaware. He contracted polio at the age of 16, and after graduating from High School (1957), became a plumber like his father. Fioretti preferred to start a ballet education and found a love of the theater. He auditioned for My Fair Lady, and went on tour with a musical version of Ninotchka in the early 1960s. There, Fioretti met the actress and future Academy Award winner Lee Grant, whom he married in 1962. He earned his living at this time with an advertising agency.

Fioretti, who wanted to sound less Italian, started to use the name Feury, and began to be artistic in many ways. Although dyslexic, he authored several screenplays, began painting for the first time in 1966, and began producing tightly budgeted B-movies in the early 1970s. From the 1980s, he was the producer of the films of his wife Lee Grant. For Grant's 1986 documentary on homelessness in the US under President Ronald Reagan, Down and Out in America, Feury and with his co-producer Milton Justice received an Academy Award for Best Documentary Feature the following year. He went on to produce a number of documentary films and TV movies. The documentary film Baghdad ER took a look at the activities of US military surgeons in the Iraq war zone. Produced in conjunction with DCTV, HBO, and his longtime collaborators Roberta Morris Purdee and wife Lee Grant, the film went on to win four Emmys, a Peabody, and the Dupont-Columbia.

In 2012, Joseph Feury began to professionally paint and also worked as draftsman. His works have been exhibited in galleries in Manhattan and across the United States. Grant colleagues such as Alan Alda, Joy Behar and Michael Douglas, a close friend of Feury's for decades, own works by Feury. His complete oeuvre was published in a book entitled Artworks of Joseph Fioretti.

In October 2019 Feury received a retrospective of his artwork at the National Arts Club in New York City.

== Filmography ==
As producer unless otherwise stated:

- 1969: Peyton Place (actor only)
- 1970: The Pleasure Game
- 1971: The Jesus Trip
- 1976: The Stranger (short film)
- 1983, 1989, 1992: America Undercover (documentary series)
- 1984: A Matter of Sex (also screenplay participation)
- 1986: Nobody's Child
- 1986: Down and Out in America (documentary)
- 1989: Staying Together
- 1989: No Place Like Home
- 1994: Seasons of the Heart
- 1995: Last Summer in the Hamptons (actor)
- 1997: Say It, Fight It, Cure It
- 1993–2004: Intimate Portrait (TV documentary series)
- 2005: Going Shopping (actor)
- 2005: ... A Father... A Son... Once Upon a Time in Hollywood (documentary)
- 2006: Baghdad ER (documentary)
