= List of American films of 2020 =

This is a list of American films released in 2020.

Due to the COVID-19 pandemic, numerous notable films that were originally scheduled for release from mid-March to December were postponed to release in mid- through late 2020, in 2021 and 2022, or were released on video on demand or on streaming services throughout 2020.

== Box office ==
The highest-grossing American films released in 2020, by domestic box office gross revenue, are as follows:

Highest-grossing films of 2020
Rank	Title	Distributor	Domestic gross
1	Bad Boys for Life	Sony	$206,305,244
2	Sonic the Hedgehog	Paramount	$148,974,665
3	Birds of Prey	Warner Bros.	$84,172,791
4	Dolittle	Universal	$77,047,065
5	The Invisible Man	Universal	$70,410,000
6	The Call of the Wild	20th Century Studios	$62,342,368
7	Onward	Disney	$61,555,145
8	The Croods: A New Age	Universal	$58,592,120
9	Tenet	Warner Bros.	$58,456,624
10	Wonder Woman 1984	Warner Bros.	$46,801,036

== January–March ==
Opening		Title	Production company	Cast and crew	Ref.
J A N U A R Y	3	The Grudge	Screen Gems / Stage 6 Films / Ghost House Pictures	Nicolas Pesce (director/screenplay); Andrea Riseborough, Demián Bichir, John Cho, Betty Gilpin, Lin Shaye, Jacki Weaver	
J A N U A R Y	10	Underwater	20th Century Fox / Chernin Entertainment	William Eubank (director); Brian Duffield, Adam Cozad (screenplay); Kristen Stewart, Vincent Cassel, Jessica Henwick, John Gallagher Jr., Mamoudou Athie, T.J. Miller	
J A N U A R Y	10	Like a Boss	Paramount Pictures / Artists First	Miguel Arteta (director); Sam Pitman, Adam Cole-Kelly (screenplay); Tiffany Haddish, Rose Byrne, Salma Hayek, Jennifer Coolidge, Billy Porter	
J A N U A R Y	10	Three Christs	IFC Films	Jon Avnet (director/screenplay); Eric Nazarian (screenplay); Richard Gere, Peter Dinklage, Walton Goggins, Bradley Whitford	
J A N U A R Y	10	Inherit the Viper	Lionsgate / Barry Films / Tycor International Film Company	Anthony Jerjen (director); Andrew Crabtree (screenplay); Josh Hartnett, Margarita Levieva, Chandler Riggs, Bruce Dern, Owen Teague	
J A N U A R Y	10	The Sonata	Screen Media Films	Andrew Desmond (director/screenplay); Arthur Morin (screenplay); Freya Tingley, Simon Abkarian, Rutger Hauer, James Faulkner	
J A N U A R Y	10	The Murder of Nicole Brown Simpson	Quiver Distribution	Daniel Farrands (director); Michael Arter (screenplay); Mena Suvari, Nick Stahl, Taryn Manning	
J A N U A R Y	14	Angels Fallen	AZ Film Studios / Uncork'd Entertainment	Ali Zamani (director); Amanda Barton (screenplay); Nicola Posener, Houston Rhines, Michael Teh, Li Jing, Michael Madsen, Said Legue, Caroline Amiguet, Eric Roberts	
J A N U A R Y	17	Bad Boys for Life	Columbia Pictures / Don Simpson/Jerry Bruckheimer Films	Adil El Arbi and Bilall Fallah (directors); Chris Bremmer (screenplay); Will Smith, Martin Lawrence, Vanessa Hudgens, Alexander Ludwig, Charles Melton, Paola Núñez, Kate del Castillo, Nicky Jam, Joe Pantoliano	
J A N U A R Y	17	Dolittle	Universal Pictures / Perfect World Pictures / Roth/Kirschenbaum Films	Stephen Gaghan (director/screenplay); Dan Gregor, Doug Mand (screenplay); Robert Downey Jr., Antonio Banderas, Michael Sheen, Emma Thompson, Rami Malek, John Cena, Kumail Nanjiani, Octavia Spencer, Tom Holland, Craig Robinson, Ralph Fiennes, Selena Gomez, Marion Cotillard	
J A N U A R Y	17	A Fall from Grace	Netflix	Tyler Perry (director/screenplay); Crystal R. Fox, Phylicia Rashad, Bresha Webb, Mehcad Brooks, Cicely Tyson, Tyler Perry	
J A N U A R Y	24	The Gentlemen	STX Films / Miramax	Guy Ritchie (director/screenplay); Matthew McConaughey, Charlie Hunnam, Henry Golding, Michelle Dockery, Jeremy Strong, Eddie Marsan, Colin Farrell, Hugh Grant	
J A N U A R Y	24	The Turning	Universal Pictures / DreamWorks Pictures / Reliance Entertainment / Vertigo Entertainment	Floria Sigismondi (director); Carey Hayes, Chad Hayes (screenplay); Mackenzie Davis, Finn Wolfhard, Brooklynn Prince, Joely Richardson	
J A N U A R Y	24	The Last Full Measure	Roadside Attractions	Todd Robinson (director/screenplay); Sebastian Stan, Christopher Plummer, William Hurt, Ed Harris, Samuel L. Jackson, Peter Fonda, LisaGay Hamilton, Jeremy Irvine, Diane Ladd, Amy Madigan, John Savage, Bradley Whitford	
J A N U A R Y	24	John Henry	Saban Films	Will Forbes (director); Doug Skinner, Will Forbes (screenplay); Terry Crews, Ludacris, Jamila Velazquez, Ken Foree, Tyler Alvarez, Joseph Julian Soria	
J A N U A R Y	31	The Rhythm Section	Paramount Pictures / Eon Productions	Reed Morano (director); Mark Burnell (screenplay); Blake Lively, Jude Law, Sterling K. Brown	
J A N U A R Y	31	Gretel & Hansel	Orion Pictures / Bron Creative	Oz Perkins (director/screenplay); Rob Hayes (screenplay); Sophia Lillis, Sammy Leakey, Charles Babalola, Jessica De Gouw, Alice Krige	
J A N U A R Y	31	The Assistant	Bleecker Street	Kitty Green (director/screenplay); Julia Garner, Matthew Macfadyen	
F E B R U A R Y	7	Birds of Prey	Warner Bros. Pictures / DC Films	Cathy Yan (director); Christina Hodson (screenplay); Margot Robbie, Mary Elizabeth Winstead, Jurnee Smollett-Bell, Rosie Perez, Chris Messina, Ella Jay Basco, Ali Wong, Ewan McGregor	
F E B R U A R Y	7	The Lodge	Neon / FilmNation Entertainment / Hammer Films	Veronika Franz, Severin Fiala (directors/screenplay); Sergio Casci (screenplay); Riley Keough, Jaeden Martell, Lia McHugh, Richard Armitage, Alicia Silverstone	
F E B R U A R Y	7	Timmy Failure: Mistakes Were Made	Disney+ / Walt Disney Pictures	Tom McCarthy (director/screenplay); Stephan Pastis (screenplay); Winslow Fegley, Ophelia Lovibond, Craig Robinson, Wallace Shawn	
F E B R U A R Y	7	Horse Girl	Netflix / Duplass Brothers Productions	Jeff Baena (director/screenplay); Alison Brie (screenplay); Alison Brie, Debby Ryan, John Paul Reynolds, Molly Shannon, John Ortiz, Paul Reiser	
F E B R U A R Y	12	To All the Boys: P.S. I Still Love You	Netflix	Michael Fimognari (director); Sofia Alvarez, J. Mills Goodloe (screenplay); Lana Condor, Noah Centineo, Jordan Fisher, Anna Cathcart, John Corbett	
F E B R U A R Y	14	Sonic the Hedgehog	Paramount Pictures / Original Film / Sega Sammy Group	Jeff Fowler (director); Patrick Casey, Josh Miller (screenplay); James Marsden, Ben Schwartz, Tika Sumpter, Natasha Rothwell, Adam Pally, Neal McDonough, Jim Carrey	
F E B R U A R Y	14	Fantasy Island	Columbia Pictures / Blumhouse Productions	Jeff Wadlow (director/screenplay); Chris Roach, Jillian Jacobs (screenplay); Michael Peña, Maggie Q, Lucy Hale, Austin Stowell, Portia Doubleday, Jimmy O. Yang, Ryan Hansen, Michael Rooker	
F E B R U A R Y	14	The Photograph	Universal Pictures / Will Packer Productions	Stella Meghie (director/screenplay); Issa Rae, Lakeith Stanfield, Chelsea Peretti, Lil Rel Howery, Courtney B. Vance	
F E B R U A R Y	14	Downhill	Searchlight Pictures	Nat Faxon, Jim Rash (directors); Jesse Armstrong (screenplay); Julia Louis-Dreyfus, Will Ferrell, Miranda Otto, Zoë Chao, Zach Woods	
F E B R U A R Y	14	Spy Intervention	Cinedigm / Sprockefeller Pictures	Drew Mylrea (director); Mark Famiglietti, Lane Garrison (screenplay); Drew Van Acker, Poppy Delevingne, Natasha Bassett, Max Silvestri, Brittany Furlan, Blake Anderson	
F E B R U A R Y	14	The Kindness of Strangers	Vertical Entertainment	Lone Scherfig (director/screenplay); Andrea Riseborough, Tahar Rahim, Zoe Kazan, Bill Nighy, Caleb Landry Jones, Jay Baruchel	
F E B R U A R Y	21	The Call of the Wild	20th Century Studios / 3 Arts Entertainment	Chris Sanders (director); Michael Green (screenplay); Harrison Ford, Omar Sy, Cara Gee, Dan Stevens, Karen Gillan, Bradley Whitford	
F E B R U A R Y	21	Emma	Focus Features	Autumn de Wilde (director); Eleanor Catton (screenplay); Anya Taylor-Joy, Johnny Flynn, Josh O'Connor, Callum Turner, Mia Goth, Miranda Hart, Bill Nighy	
F E B R U A R Y	21	The Last Thing He Wanted	Netflix	Dee Rees (director/screenplay); Marco Villalobos (screenplay); Anne Hathaway, Ben Affleck, Rosie Perez, Edi Gathegi, Mel Rodriguez, Toby Jones, Willem Dafoe	
F E B R U A R Y	21	Brahms: The Boy II	STX Films	William Brent Bell (director); Stacey Menear (screenplay); Katie Holmes, Owain Yeoman, Christopher Convery, Ralph Ineson	
F E B R U A R Y	21	The Night Clerk	Saban Films	Michael Cristofer (director/screenplay); Tye Sheridan, Ana de Armas, Helen Hunt, John Leguizamo	
F E B R U A R Y	21	Impractical Jokers: The Movie	truTV / Funny or Die	Chris Henchy (director/screenplay); Brian Quinn, Joe Gatto, Sal Vulcano, James Murray (screenplay); Brian Quinn, Joe Gatto, Sal Vulcano, James Murray, Paula Abdul	
F E B R U A R Y	28	The Invisible Man	Universal Pictures / Blumhouse Productions	Leigh Whannell (director/screenplay); Elisabeth Moss, Aldis Hodge, Storm Reid, Harriet Dyer, Michael Dorman, Oliver Jackson-Cohen	
F E B R U A R Y	28	All the Bright Places	Netflix	Brett Haley (director); Jennifer Niven, Liz Hannah (screenplay); Elle Fanning, Justice Smith, Alexandra Shipp, Keegan-Michael Key, Luke Wilson	
F E B R U A R Y	28	Wendy	Searchlight Pictures	Benh Zeitlin (director/screenplay); Eliza Zeitlin (screenplay); Tommie Lynn Milazzo, Shay Walker	
F E B R U A R Y	28	Guns Akimbo	Saban Films / Ingenious Media	Jason Lei Howden (director/screenplay); Daniel Radcliffe, Samara Weaving, Natasha Liu Bordizzo	
F E B R U A R Y	28	Saint Frances	Oscilloscope	Alex Thompson (director); Kelly O'Sullivan (screenplay); Kelly O'Sullivan, Ramona Edith Williams, Charin Alvarez, Lily Mojekwu, Max Lipchitz, Jim True-Frost, Mary Beth Fisher, Francis Guinan, Rebecca Spence, Bradley Grant Smith	
M A R C H	6	Onward	Walt Disney Pictures / Pixar Animation Studios	Dan Scanlon (director/screenplay); Jason Headley, Keith Bunin (screenplay); Tom Holland, Chris Pratt, Julia Louis-Dreyfus, Octavia Spencer	
M A R C H	6	The Way Back	Warner Bros. Pictures / Bron Creative	Gavin O'Connor (director); Brad Ingelsby (screenplay); Ben Affleck, Al Madrigal, Michaela Watkins, Janina Gavankar, Glynn Turman	
M A R C H	6	Spenser Confidential	Netflix	Peter Berg (director); Sean O'Keefe, Brian Helgeland (screenplay); Mark Wahlberg, Winston Duke, Alan Arkin, Iliza Shlesinger, Bokeem Woodbine, Marc Maron, Austin Post	
M A R C H	6	The Banker	Apple TV+	George Nolfi (director/screenplay); Niceole Levy (screenplay); Anthony Mackie, Nicholas Hoult, Nia Long, Samuel L. Jackson	
M A R C H	6	The Burnt Orange Heresy	Sony Pictures Classics	Giuseppe Capotondi (director); Scott Smith (screenplay); Claes Bang, Elizabeth Debicki, Mick Jagger, Donald Sutherland	
M A R C H	6	Swallow	IFC Films	Carlo Mirabella-Davis (director/screenplay); Haley Bennett, Austin Stowell, Elizabeth Marvel, David Rasche, Denis O'Hare	
M A R C H	6	First Cow	A24	Kelly Reichardt (director/screenplay); Jonathan Raymond (screenplay); John Magaro, Orion Hall, René Auberjonois	
M A R C H	13	Bloodshot	Columbia Pictures / Cross Creek Pictures / Original Film	Dave S. F. Wilson (director); Jeff Wadlow, Eric Heisserer (screenplay); Vin Diesel, Eiza González, Sam Heughan, Toby Kebbell, Lamorne Morris, Guy Pearce	
M A R C H	13	The Hunt	Universal Pictures / Blumhouse Productions	Craig Zobel (director); Nick Cuse, Damon Lindelof (screenplay); Betty Gilpin, Ike Barinholtz, Amy Madigan, Emma Roberts, Ethan Suplee, Hilary Swank	
M A R C H	13	I Still Believe	Lionsgate	Erwin Brothers (directors); Jon Erwin, Jon Gunn (screenplay); KJ Apa, Britt Robertson, Shania Twain, Gary Sinise	
M A R C H	13	Lost Girls	Netflix	Liz Garbus (director); Michael Werwie (screenplay); Amy Ryan, Thomasin McKenzie, Lola Kirke, Oona Laurence, Dean Winters, Miriam Shor, Reed Birney, Kevin Corrigan, Gabriel Byrne	
M A R C H	13	Stargirl	Disney+ / Walt Disney Pictures	Julia Hart (director/screenplay); Kristin Hahn, Jordan Horowitz (screenplay); Grace VanderWaal, Graham Verchere, Giancarlo Esposito	
M A R C H	13	The Roads Not Taken	Bleecker Street / Focus Features	Sally Potter (director/screenplay); Javier Bardem, Elle Fanning, Laura Linney, Salma Hayek	
M A R C H	13	Never Rarely Sometimes Always	Focus Features / BBC Films	Eliza Hittman (director/screenplay); Sidney Flanigan, Talia Ryder, Theodore Pellerin, Ryan Eggold, Sharon Van Etten	
M A R C H	13	Big Time Adolescence	Hulu	Jason Orley (director); Jason Orley (screenplay); Pete Davidson, Griffin Gluck, Jon Cryer, Oona Laurence, Sydney Sweeney	
M A R C H	13	Lost Transmissions	Gravitas Ventures	Katharine O'Brien (director/screenplay); Simon Pegg, Juno Temple, Alexandra Daddario, Tao Okamoto, Rosanna Arquette, Bria Vinaite	
M A R C H	20	No films were released on this date as a result of the closure of theaters caused by the COVID-19 pandemic.			
M A R C H	27	Resistance	IFC Films	Jonathan Jakubowicz (director/screenplay); Jesse Eisenberg, Ed Harris, Clémence Poésy, Matthias Schweighöfer, Félix Moati, Karl Markovics, Vica Kerekes, Bella Ramsey, Édgar Ramírez	
M A R C H	27	Uncorked	Netflix	Prentice Penny (director/screenplay); Mamoudou Athie, Courtney B. Vance, Niecy Nash, Matt McGorry	
M A R C H	27	Vivarium	Vertigo Films	Lorcan Finnegan (director); Imogen Poots, Jesse Eisenberg	

== April–June ==
Opening		Title	Production company	Cast and crew	Ref.
A P R I L	3	Coffee & Kareem	Netflix	Michael Dowse (director); Shane McCarthy (screenplay); Ed Helms, Taraji P. Henson, Betty Gilpin, King Bach, David Alan Grier	
A P R I L	10	Trolls World Tour	Universal Pictures / DreamWorks Animation	Walt Dohrn (director); Jonathan Aibel, Glenn Berger, Elizabeth Tippet, Maya Forbes, Wallace Wolodarsky (screenplay); Anna Kendrick, Justin Timberlake, Rachel Bloom, James Corden, Ron Funches, Kelly Clarkson, Anderson Paak, Sam Rockwell, George Clinton, Mary J. Blige	
A P R I L	10	Love Wedding Repeat	Netflix	Dean Craig (director/screenplay); Olivia Munn, Sam Claflin, Freida Pinto, Eleanor Tomlinson, Jack Farthing	
A P R I L	10	The Main Event	Netflix / WWE Studios	Jay Karas (director); Larry Postel (screenplay); Seth Carr, Tichina Arnold, Ken Marino, Adam Pally	
A P R I L	10	We Summon the Darkness	Saban Films	Marc Meyers (director); Alan Trezza (screenplay); Alexandra Daddario, Keean Johnson, Logan Miller, Maddie Hasson, Amy Forsyth, Austin Swift, Johnny Knoxville	
A P R I L	10	The Lost Husband	Quiver Distribution	Vicky Wight (director/screenplay); Leslie Bibb, Josh Duhamel, Nora Dunn	
A P R I L	10	Corona Zombies	Full Moon Features	Charles Band (director/screenplay); Cody Renee Cameron, Russell Coker, Robin Sydney	
A P R I L	14	Skin: The Movie	Ronn Kilby Creative / Wrap That Rascal Productions / Spike Films	Ronn Kilby (director/screenplay); Mark Christopher Lawrence, Diane Sargent, Michelle Way, Angel Cassidy, Merrick McCartha, Mark Atkinson, Karl Backus, "Shotgun Tom" Kelly	
A P R I L	17	Sergio	Netflix	Greg Barker (director); Craig Borten (screenplay); Wagner Moura, Ana de Armas, Garret Dillahunt, Brían F. O'Byrne, Clemens Schick, Bradley Whitford	
A P R I L	22	The Willoughbys	Netflix / Bron Studios	Kris Pearn (director/screenplay); Mark Stanleigh (screenplay); Will Forte, Maya Rudolph, Alessia Cara, Terry Crews, Martin Short, Jane Krakowski, Ricky Gervais	
A P R I L	24	Extraction	Netflix / AGBO	Sam Hargrave (director); Joe Russo (screenplay); Chris Hemsworth, Rudhraksh Jaiswal, Randeep Hooda, Golshifteh Farahani, Pankaj Tripathi, David Harbour	
A P R I L	24	Braking for Whales	Gravitas Ventures	Sean McEwen (director/screenplay); Tammin Sursok (screenplay); Tom Felton, Tammin Sursok, Wendi McLendon-Covey, David Koechner	
A P R I L	25	Bad Education	HBO Films	Cory Finley (director); Mike Makowsky (screenplay); Hugh Jackman, Allison Janney, Geraldine Viswanathan, Alex Wolff, Rafael Casal, Stephen Spinella, Annaleigh Ashford, Ray Romano	
A P R I L	30	Dangerous Lies	Netflix	Michael Scott (director); David Golden (screenplay); Camila Mendes, Jessie T. Usher, Jamie Chung, Cam Gigandet, Sasha Alexander, Elliott Gould	
M A Y	1	All Day and a Night	Netflix	Joe Robert Cole (director/screenplay); Ashton Sanders, Jeffrey Wright, Yahya Abdul-Mateen II	
M A Y	1	The Wretched	IFC Midnight	The Pierce Brothers (director/screenplay); John-Paul Howard, Piper Curda, Zarah Mahler, Kevin Bigley	
M A Y	1	The Half of It	Netflix / Likely Story	Alice Wu (director/screenplay); Leah Lewis, Daniel Diemer, Alexxis Lemire, Collin Chou	
M A Y	5	Arkansas	Lionsgate	Clark Duke (director/screenplay); Andrew Boonkrong (screenplay); Liam Hemsworth, Clark Duke, Michael Kenneth Williams, Vivica A. Fox, Eden Brolin, Chandler Duke, John Malkovich, Vince Vaughn	
M A Y	8	Valley Girl	Orion Classics / Metro-Goldwyn-Mayer	Rachel Lee Goldenberg (director); Amy Talkington (screenplay); Jessica Rothe, Josh Whitehouse, Mae Whitman, Judy Greer	
M A Y	12	Capone	Vertical Entertainment / Bron Studios	Josh Trank (director/screenplay); Tom Hardy, Linda Cardellini, Jack Lowden, Noel Fisher, Kyle MacLachlan, Matt Dillon	
M A Y	15	The Wrong Missy	Netflix	Tyler Spindel (director); Kevin Barnett, Chris Pappas (screenplay); David Spade, Lauren Lapkus, Geoff Pierson, Sarah Chalke, Molly Sims	
M A Y	15	Scoob!	Warner Bros. Pictures / Warner Animation Group	Tony Cervone (director); Adam Sztykiel, Jack Donaldson, Derek Elliott, Matt Lieberman (screenplay); Will Forte, Mark Wahlberg, Jason Isaacs, Gina Rodriguez, Zac Efron, Amanda Seyfried, Kiersey Clemons, Ken Jeong, Tracy Morgan, Frank Welker	
M A Y	15	Proximity	Demeusy Pictures / Shout! Studios	Eric Demeusy (director/screenplay); Ryan Masson, Highdee Kuan, Christian Prentice, Shaw Jones, Don Scribner, Sarah Navratil, Randy Davison	
M A Y	15	Blood and Money	Screen Media Films	John Barr (director/screenplay); Mike McGrale, Alan Petherick (screenplay); Tom Berenger, Kristen Hager, Mark Sivertsen, Paul Ben-Victor	
M A Y	19	Body Cam	Paramount Players	Malik Vitthal (director); Richmond Riedel (screenplay); Mary J. Blige, Nat Wolff, David Zayas, David Warshofsky, Demetrius Grosse, Anika Noni Rose	
M A Y	22	The Lovebirds	Netflix / Paramount Pictures / MRC	Michael Showalter (director); Aaron Abrams, Brendan Gall (screenplay); Issa Rae, Kumail Nanjiani, Paul Sparks, Anna Camp, Kyle Bornheimer	
M A Y	22	Inheritance	Vertical Entertainment	Vaughn Stein (director); Matthew Kennedy (screenplay); Lily Collins, Simon Pegg, Chace Crawford, Connie Nielsen, Patrick Warburton, Adam Beach	
M A Y	22	Survive the Night	Lionsgate	Matt Eskandari (director); Doug Wolfe (screenplay); Bruce Willis, Chad Michael Murray	
M A Y	22	The Wanting Mare	Gravitas Ventures	Nicholas Ashe Bateman (director/screenplay); Josh Clark	
M A Y	29	The High Note	Focus Features / Working Title Films / Perfect World Pictures	Nisha Ganatra (director); Flora Greeson (screenplay); Dakota Johnson, Tracee Ellis Ross, Kelvin Harrison Jr., Ice Cube, Zoë Chao, Bill Pullman, Eddie Izzard	
J U N E	5	Shirley	Neon	Josephine Decker (director); Sarah Gubbins (screenplay); Elisabeth Moss, Michael Stuhlbarg, Odessa Young, Logan Lerman	
J U N E	5	The Last Days of American Crime	Netflix	Olivier Megaton (director); Karl Gajdusek (screenplay); Édgar Ramírez, Anna Brewster, Michael Pitt, Sharlto Copley	
J U N E	5	Becky	Quiver Distribution / Redbox Entertainment	Jonathan Milott, Cary Murnion (director); Nick Morris, Lane Skye, Ruckus Skye (screenplay); Lulu Wilson, Kevin James, Joel McHale	
J U N E	5	Mighty Oak	Paramount Pictures / Brookwell McNamara Entertainment	Sean McNamara (director); Matt R. Allen (screenplay); Janel Parrish, Alexa PenaVega, Carlos PenaVega, Raven-Symoné, Levi Dylan, Tommy Ragen	
J U N E	7	Think Like a Dog	Lionsgate / Ingenious Media	Gil Junger (director/screenplay); Josh Duhamel, Megan Fox	
J U N E	12	Da 5 Bloods	Netflix	Spike Lee (director/screenplay); Danny Bilson, Paul De Meo, Kevin Willmott (screenplay); Delroy Lindo, Jonathan Majors, Clarke Peters, Norm Lewis, Isiah Whitlock Jr., Mélanie Thierry, Paul Walter Hauser, Jasper Pääkkönen, Jean Reno, Chadwick Boseman	
J U N E	12	Artemis Fowl	Disney+ / Walt Disney Pictures	Kenneth Branagh (director); Conor McPherson, Hamish McColl (screenplay); Ferdia Shaw, Lara McDonnell, Josh Gad, Tamara Smart, Nonso Anozie, Colin Farrell, Judi Dench	
J U N E	12	The King of Staten Island	Universal Pictures / Apatow Productions / Perfect World Pictures	Judd Apatow (director/screenplay); Pete Davidson, Dave Sirus (screenplay); Pete Davidson, Marisa Tomei, Bill Burr, Bel Powley, Maude Apatow, Steve Buscemi	
J U N E	16	Sniper: Assassin's End	Destination Films	Kaare Andrews (director); Oliver Thompson (screenplay); Chad Michael Collins, Tom Berenger, Sayaka Akimoto, Lochlyn Munro, Ryan Robbins	
J U N E	18	You Should Have Left	Universal Pictures / Blumhouse Productions	David Koepp (director/screenplay); Kevin Bacon, Amanda Seyfried	
J U N E	19	Wasp Network	Netflix	Olivier Assayas (director/screenplay); Penélope Cruz, Édgar Ramírez, Gael García Bernal, Ana de Armas, Wagner Moura	
J U N E	19	Feel the Beat	Netflix	Elissa Down (director); Sofia Carson, Enrico Colantoni, Wolfgang Novogratz	
J U N E	19	7500	Amazon Studios	Patrick Vollrath (director/screenplay); Joseph Gordon-Levitt	
J U N E	24	Athlete A	Netflix	Bonni Cohen, Jon Shenk (director)	
J U N E	26	Eurovision Song Contest: The Story of Fire Saga	Netflix / Gary Sanchez Productions / Gloria Sanchez Productions	David Dobkin (director); Will Ferrell, Andrew Steele (screenplay); Will Ferrell, Rachel McAdams, Dan Stevens, Demi Lovato, Pierce Brosnan	
J U N E	26	Irresistible	Focus Features / Plan B Entertainment	Jon Stewart (director/screenplay); Steve Carell, Chris Cooper, Mackenzie Davis, Topher Grace, Natasha Lyonne, Rose Byrne	
J U N E	26	My Spy	Amazon Studios / STX Films / Madison Wells Media Studios	Peter Segal (director); Jon Hoeber, Erich Hoeber (screenplay); Dave Bautista, Chloe Coleman, Kristen Schaal, Ken Jeong	
J U N E	26	We Bare Bears: The Movie	Cartoon Network Studios	Daniel Chong (director); Mikey Heller, Kris Mukai (screenplay); Eric Edelstein, Bobby Moynihan, Demetri Martin, Marc Evan Jackson, Keith Ferguson	

== July–September ==
Opening		Title	Production company	Cast and crew	Ref.
J U L Y	3	Hamilton	Disney+ / Walt Disney Pictures	Thomas Kail (director); Lin-Manuel Miranda, Phillipa Soo, Leslie Odom Jr., Renée Elise Goldsberry, Christopher Jackson, Daveed Diggs, Okieriete Onaodowan, Anthony Ramos, Jasmine Cephas Jones, Jonathan Groff	
J U L Y	3	Relic	IFC Midnight / Nine Stories Productions / AGBO	Natalie Erika James (director/screenplay); Christian White (screenplay); Emily Mortimer, Robyn Nevin, Bella Heathcote	
J U L Y	3	Desperados	Netflix	LP (director); Ellen Rapoport (screenplay); Anna Camp, Robbie Amell, Nasim Pedrad, Lamorne Morris, Heather Graham, Sarah Burns	
J U L Y	10	The Old Guard	Netflix / Skydance Media	Gina Prince-Bythewood (director); Greg Rucka (screenplay); Charlize Theron, KiKi Layne, Marwan Kenzari, Luca Marinelli, Harry Melling, Veronica Ngo, Matthias Schoenaerts, Chiwetel Ejiofor	
J U L Y	10	Money Plane	Quiver Distribution	Andrew Lawrence (director/screenplay); Tim Schaaf (screenplay); Adam Copeland, Kelsey Grammer, Thomas Jane, Denise Richards, Katrina Norman, Patrick Lamont Jr., Andrew Lawrence, Joey Lawrence, Matthew Lawrence	
J U L Y	10	Greyhound	Apple TV+ / Stage 6 Films / FilmNation Entertainment / Bron Creative / Playtone	Aaron Schneider (director); Tom Hanks (screenplay); Tom Hanks, Stephen Graham, Rob Morgan, Elisabeth Shue	
J U L Y	10	Palm Springs	Hulu / Neon	Max Barbakow (director); Andy Siara (screenplay); Andy Samberg, Cristin Milioti, Peter Gallagher, J. K. Simmons	
J U L Y	16	Fatal Affair	Netflix	Peter Sullivan (director/screenplay); Rasheeda Garner (screenplay); Nia Long, Omar Epps, Stephen Bishop, KJ Smith	
J U L Y	16	The Silencing	DirecTV / Saban Films	Robin Pront (director); Micah Ranum (screenplay); Annabelle Wallis, Hero Fiennes-Tiffin, Nikolaj Coster-Waldau	
J U L Y	17	A Nice Girl Like You	Vertical Entertainment	The Brothers Riedell (directors); Andrea Marcellus (screenplay); Lucy Hale, Leonidas Gulaptis, Jackie Cruz	
J U L Y	17	Ghosts of War	Vertical Entertainment	Eric Bress (director/screenplay); Brenton Thwaites, Theo Rossi, Skylar Astin, Kyle Gallner, Alan Ritchson	
J U L Y	24	Animal Crackers	Netflix	Scott Christian Sava (director/screenplay); Tony Bancroft (director); Dean Lorey (screenplay); John Krasinski, Emily Blunt, Ian McKellen, Danny DeVito, Sylvester Stallone, Raven-Symoné, Patrick Warburton	
J U L Y	24	The Kissing Booth 2	Netflix	Vince Marcello (director/screenplay); Jay Arnold (screenplay); Joey King, Joel Courtney, Jacob Elordi, Maisie Richardson-Sellers, Taylor Perez, Molly Ringwald	
J U L Y	24	The Rental	IFC Films	Dave Franco (director/screenplay); Joe Swanberg (screenplay); Dan Stevens, Alison Brie, Sheila Vand, Jeremy Allen White, Toby Huss	
J U L Y	31	Black Is King	Disney+ / Walt Disney Studios Motion Pictures	Beyoncé, Emmanuel Adjei, Blitz Bazawule, Ibra Ake, Jenn Nkiru, Jake Nava, Pierre Debusschere, Dikayl Rimmasch (directors); Beyoncé, Yrsa Daley-Ward, Clover Hope, Andrew Morro (screenplay); Beyoncé	
J U L Y	31	The Secret: Dare to Dream	Roadside Attractions / Gravitas Ventures	Andy Tennant (director/screenplay); Bekah Brunstetter, Rick Parks (screenplay); Katie Holmes, Josh Lucas, Jerry O'Connell, Celia Weston	
J U L Y	31	Summerland	IFC Films	Jessica Swale (director/screenplay); Gemma Arterton, Gugu Mbatha-Raw, Penelope Wilton, Tom Courtenay	
J U L Y	31	She Dies Tomorrow	Neon	Amy Seimetz (director/screenplay); Kate Lyn Sheil, Jane Adams, Kentucker Audley, Katie Aselton, Adam Wingard	
A U G U S T	6	An American Pickle	HBO Max / Warner Max / Point Grey Pictures	Brandon Trost (director); Simon Rich (screenplay); Seth Rogen, Sarah Snook	
A U G U S T	7	The Tax Collector	RLJE Films	David Ayer (director/screenplay); Bobby Soto, Shia LaBeouf, Cinthya Carmona, George Lopez	
A U G U S T	7	Waiting for the Barbarians	Samuel Goldwyn Films	Ciro Guerra (director); J. M. Coetzee (screenplay); Mark Rylance, Johnny Depp, Robert Pattinson, Gana Bayarsaikhan, Greta Scacchi	
A U G U S T	14	Project Power	Netflix	Henry Joost, Ariel Schulman (director); Mattson Tomlin (screenplay); Jamie Foxx, Joseph Gordon-Levitt, Dominique Fishback, Rodrigo Santoro, Machine Gun Kelly, Allen Maldonado, Amy Landecker, Courtney B. Vance, C.J. LeBlanc	
A U G U S T	14	The SpongeBob Movie: Sponge on the Run (Canadian theatrical release)	Paramount Animation / Nickelodeon Movies / MRC	Tim Hill (director/screenplay); Tom Kenny, Awkwafina, Matt Berry, Snoop Dogg, Bill Fagerbakke, Clancy Brown, Tiffany Haddish, Carolyn Lawrence, Mr. Lawrence, Keanu Reeves, Danny Trejo, Reggie Watts	
A U G U S T	14	Magic Camp	Disney+ / Walt Disney Pictures	Mark Waters (director); Micah Fitzerman-Blue, Noah Harpster, Matt Spicer, Max Winkler, Dan Gregor, Doug Mand (screenplay); Adam DeVine, Gillian Jacobs, Jeffrey Tambor	
A U G U S T	14	Spree	RLJE Films / DreamCrew	Eugene Kotlyarenko (director); Gene McHugh (screenplay); Joe Keery, Sasheer Zamata, Mischa Barton, John DeLuca	
A U G U S T	14	Boys State	Apple TV+ / A24 / Concordia Studio	Amanda McBaine, Jesse Moss (directors)	
A U G U S T	21	The One and Only Ivan	Disney+ / Walt Disney Pictures	Thea Sharrock (director); Mike White (screenplay); Sam Rockwell, Angelina Jolie, Danny DeVito, Helen Mirren, Brooklynn Prince, Ramón Rodríguez, Ariana Greenblatt, Chaka Khan, Ron Funches, Phillipa Soo, Mike White, Bryan Cranston	
A U G U S T	21	Unhinged	Solstice Studios / Ingenious Media	Derrick Borte (director); Carl Ellsworth (screenplay); Russell Crowe, Caren Pistorius, Gabriel Bateman, Jimmi Simpson, Austin P. McKenzie	
A U G U S T	21	Tesla	IFC Films / Campbell Grobman Films	Michael Almereyda (director/screenplay); Ethan Hawke, Eve Hewson, Ebon Moss-Bachrach, Jim Gaffigan, Kyle MacLachlan	
A U G U S T	21	Cut Throat City	Well Go USA Entertainment	RZA (director); Paul Cuschieri (screenplay); Shameik Moore, T.I., Demetrius Shipp Jr., Kat Graham, Wesley Snipes, Terrence Howard, Eiza González, Ethan Hawke	
A U G U S T	21	Words on Bathroom Walls	LD Entertainment	Thor Freudenthal (director); Nick Naveda (screenplay); Charlie Plummer, Andy García, Taylor Russell, AnnaSophia Robb, Beth Grant, Molly Parker, Walton Goggins	
A U G U S T	21	Hard Kill	Vertical Entertainment	Matt Eskandari (director); Chris LaMont, Joe Russo (screenplay); Jesse Metcalfe, Bruce Willis	
A U G U S T	21	Chemical Hearts	Amazon Studios	Richard Tanne (director/screenplay); Austin Abrams, Lili Reinhart	
A U G U S T	28	Bill & Ted Face the Music	Orion Pictures / Endeavor Content	Dean Parisot (director); Chris Matheson, Ed Solomon (screenplay); Keanu Reeves, Alex Winter, Kristen Schaal, Samara Weaving, Brigette Lundy-Paine, Anthony Carrigan, Erinn Hayes, Jayma Mays, Holland Taylor, Kid Cudi, William Sadler, Jillian Bell	
A U G U S T	28	The New Mutants	20th Century Studios / Marvel Entertainment	Josh Boone (director/screenplay); Knate Lee (screenplay); Maisie Williams, Anya Taylor-Joy, Charlie Heaton, Alice Braga, Blu Hunt, Henry Zaga, Adam Beach	
A U G U S T	28	The Personal History of David Copperfield	Searchlight Pictures / FilmNation Entertainment / Film4	Armando Iannucci (director/screenplay); Simon Blackwell (screenplay); Dev Patel, Aneurin Barnard, Peter Capaldi, Morfydd Clark, Daisy May Cooper, Rosalind Eleazar, Hugh Laurie, Tilda Swinton, Ben Whishaw, Paul Whitehouse	
A U G U S T	28	I'm Thinking of Ending Things	Netflix / Likely Story / Projective Testing Services	Charlie Kaufman (director/screenplay); Jesse Plemons, Jessie Buckley, Toni Collette, David Thewlis	
A U G U S T	28	Phineas and Ferb the Movie: Candace Against the Universe	Disney+ / Disney Television Animation	Bob Bowen (director); Dan Povenmire, Jeff "Swampy" Marsh, Jon Colton Barry, Jim Bernstein, Joshua Pruett (screenplay); Vincent Martella, Ashley Tisdale, David Errigo Jr., Dee Bradley Baker, Dan Povenmire, Caroline Rhea, Jeff "Swampy" Marsh, Alyson Stoner	
A U G U S T	28	All Together Now	Netflix	Brett Haley (director); Matthew Quick, Matt Basch (screenplay); Auliʻi Cravalho, Rhenzy Feliz, Judy Reyes, Justina Machado, Taylor Richardson, C.S. Lee, Fred Armisen, Carol Burnett	
A U G U S T	28	Rogue	Lionsgate	M. J. Bassett (director/screenplay); Isabel Bassett (screenplay); Megan Fox, Philip Winchester	
A U G U S T	28	Centigrade	IFC Midnight	Brendan Walsh (director/screenplay); Genesis Rodriguez, Vincent Piazza, Louis Cancelmi	
A U G U S T	28	Fatima	Picturehouse	Marco Pontecorvo (director); Barbara Nicolosi, Marco Pontecorvo, Valerio D'Annunzio (screenplay); Joaquim de Almeida, Goran Višnjić, Stephanie Gil, Alejandra Howard, Jorge Lamelas, Lúcia Moniz, Marco d'Almeida, Joana Ribeiro, Harvey Keitel, Sônia Braga	
S E P T E M B E R	3	Tenet	Warner Bros. Pictures / Syncopy Inc.	Christopher Nolan (director/screenplay); John David Washington, Robert Pattinson, Elizabeth Debicki, Dimple Kapadia, Martin Donovan, Fiona Dourif, Yuri Kolokolnikov, Himesh Patel, Clémence Poésy, Aaron Taylor-Johnson, Michael Caine, Kenneth Branagh	
S E P T E M B E R	3	Love, Guaranteed	Netflix	Mark Steven Johnson (director); Elizabeth Hackett, Hilary Galanoy (screenplay); Rachael Leigh Cook, Damon Wayans Jr.	
S E P T E M B E R	4	Mulan	Disney+ / Walt Disney Pictures	Niki Caro (director); Rick Jaffa, Amanda Silver, Laura Hynek, Elizabeth Martin (screenplay); Liu Yifei, Donnie Yen, Tzi Ma, Jason Scott Lee, Yoson An, Ron Yuan, Gong Li, Jet Li	
S E P T E M B E R	4	Critical Thinking	Vertical Entertainment	John Leguizamo (director); Dito Montiel (screenplay); John Leguizamo, Jorge Lendeborg Jr., Angel Bismark Curiel, Will Hochman, Corwin Tuggles, Jeffry Batista, Ramses Jimenez, Rachel Bay Jones, Michael K. Williams	
S E P T E M B E R	4	The Owners	RLJE Films / Wild Bunch / XYZ Films	Julius Berg (director/screenplay); Mathieu Gompel (screenplay); Maisie Williams, Sylvester McCoy, Rita Tushingham, Jake Curran, Andrew Ellis, Ian Kenny	
S E P T E M B E R	4	Guest House	Lionsgate	Sam Macaroni (director/screenplay); Sean Bishop, Troy Duffy (screenplay); Pauly Shore, Mike Castle, Aimee Teegarden, Billy Zane, Steve-O, Charlotte McKinney, Mikaela Hoover	
S E P T E M B E R	10	The Babysitter: Killer Queen	Netflix	McG (director/screenplay); Dan Lagana (screenplay); Judah Lewis, Emily Alyn Lind, Jenna Ortega, Robbie Amell, Bella Thorne, Samara Weaving	
S E P T E M B E R	10	Unpregnant	HBO Max / Warner Max	Rachel Lee Goldenberg (director/screenplay); Ted Caplan, Jenni Hendriks, Jennifer Kaytin Robinson, William Parker (screenplay); Haley Lu Richardson, Barbie Ferreira, Alex MacNicoll, Breckin Meyer, Giancarlo Esposito	
S E P T E M B E R	11	The Devil All the Time	Netflix / Nine Stories Productions	Antonio Campos (director/screenplay); Paulo Campos (screenplay); Tom Holland, Bill Skarsgård, Riley Keough, Jason Clarke, Sebastian Stan, Haley Bennett, Eliza Scanlen, Mia Wasikowska, Robert Pattinson	
S E P T E M B E R	11	The Broken Hearts Gallery	TriStar Pictures / Stage 6 Films	Natalie Krinsky (director/screenplay); Geraldine Viswanathan, Dacre Montgomery, Utkarsh Ambudkar, Molly Gordon, Phillipa Soo, Bernadette Peters	
S E P T E M B E R	11	I Met a Girl	Gravitas Ventures	Luke Eve (director); Glen Dolman (screenplay); Brenton Thwaites, Lily Sullivan, Joel Jackson	
S E P T E M B E R	11	Rent-A-Pal	IFC Midnight	Jon Stevenson (director/screenplay); Wil Wheaton, Brian Landis Folkins, Kathleen Brady, Amy Rutledge, Adrian Egolf	
S E P T E M B E R	16	The Secrets We Keep	Bleecker Street	Yuval Adler (director/screenplay); Ryan Covington (screenplay); Noomi Rapace, Joel Kinnaman, Chris Messina	
S E P T E M B E R	18	Antebellum	Lionsgate	Gerard Bush, Christopher Renz (directors/screenplay); Janelle Monáe, Eric Lange, Jena Malone, Jack Huston, Kiersey Clemons, Gabourey Sidibe	
S E P T E M B E R	18	The Nest	IFC Films / FilmNation Entertainment	Sean Durkin (director/screenplay); Jude Law, Carrie Coon, Charlie Shotwell, Oona Roche, Adeel Akhtar	
S E P T E M B E R	18	Blackbird	Screen Media Films / Millennium Films	Roger Michell (director); Christian Torpe (screenplay); Susan Sarandon, Kate Winslet, Mia Wasikowska, Lindsay Duncan, Rainn Wilson, Bex Taylor-Klaus, Sam Neill	
S E P T E M B E R	18	Lost Girls & Love Hotels	Astrakan Film AB	William Olsson (director); Catherine Hanrahan (screenplay); Alexandra Daddario, Takehiro Hira, Carice van Houten	
S E P T E M B E R	18	Killian & the Comeback Kids	Hope Runs High	Taylor A. Purdee (director/screenplay); Taylor A. Purdee, John Donchak, Nathan Purdee, Kassie DePaiva	
S E P T E M B E R	23	Enola Holmes	Netflix / Legendary Pictures	Harry Bradbeer (director); Jack Thorne (screenplay); Millie Bobby Brown, Henry Cavill, Sam Claflin, Adeel Akhtar, Fiona Shaw, Frances de la Tour, Louis Partridge, Susie Wokoma, Helena Bonham Carter	
S E P T E M B E R	25	The Trial of the Chicago 7	Netflix / Paramount Pictures / DreamWorks Pictures / Cross Creek Pictures	Aaron Sorkin (director/screenplay); Yahya Abdul-Mateen II, Sacha Baron Cohen, Danny Flaherty, Joseph Gordon-Levitt, Michael Keaton, Frank Langella, John Carroll Lynch, Eddie Redmayne, Noah Robbins, Mark Rylance, Alex Sharp, Jeremy Strong	
S E P T E M B E R	25	Ava	Vertical Entertainment / Voltage Pictures	Tate Taylor (director); Matthew Newton (screenplay); Jessica Chastain, John Malkovich, Common, Geena Davis, Colin Farrell, Ioan Gruffudd, Joan Chen	
S E P T E M B E R	25	Kajillionaire	Focus Features / Plan B Entertainment / Annapurna Pictures	Miranda July (director/screenplay); Evan Rachel Wood, Richard Jenkins, Debra Winger, Gina Rodriguez	
S E P T E M B E R	25	The Last Shift	Stage 6 Films	Andrew Cohn (director/screenplay); Richard Jenkins, Shane Paul McGhie, Da'Vine Joy Randolph, Birgundi Baker, Allison Tolman, Ed O'Neill	
S E P T E M B E R	25	Secret Society of Second-Born Royals	Disney+ / Disney Channel	Anna Mastro (director); Alex Litvak, Andrew Green (screenplay); Peyton Elizabeth Lee, Skylar Astin, Élodie Yung	
S E P T E M B E R	25	She's in Portland	Freestyle Releasing	Marc Carlini (director/screenplay); Patrick Alexander (screenplay); Tommy Dewey, François Arnaud, Minka Kelly	
S E P T E M B E R	29	Sightless	MarVista Entertainment	Cooper Karl (director/screenplay); Madelaine Petsch, Alexander Koch	
S E P T E M B E R	30	The Boys in the Band	Netflix	Joe Mantello (director); Mart Crowley (screenplay); Jim Parsons, Zachary Quinto, Matt Bomer, Andrew Rannells, Charlie Carver, Robin de Jesus, Brian Hutchison, Michael Benjamin Washington, Tuc Watkins	
S E P T E M B E R	30	The Glorias	Roadside Attractions / LD Entertainment	Julie Taymor (director/screenplay); Sarah Ruhl (screenplay); Julianne Moore, Alicia Vikander, Timothy Hutton, Lorraine Toussaint, Janelle Monáe, Bette Midler	

== October–December ==
Opening		Title	Production company	Cast and crew	Ref.
O C T O B E R	2	On the Rocks	Apple TV+ / A24 / American Zoetrope	Sofia Coppola (director/screenplay); Rashida Jones, Bill Murray, Marlon Wayans, Jessica Henwick, Jenny Slate	
O C T O B E R	2	Spontaneous	Paramount Pictures / Awesomeness Films / Jurassic Party Productions	Brian Duffield (director/screenplay); Katherine Langford, Charlie Plummer, Hayley Law, Piper Perabo, Rob Huebel, Yvonne Orji	
O C T O B E R	2	Vampires vs. the Bronx	Netflix / Universal Pictures	Osmany Rodriguez (director/screenplay); Blaise Hemingway (screenplay); Jaden Michael, Gerald W. Jones III, Gregory Diaz IV, Sarah Gadon, Coco Jones, The Kid Mero, Method Man, Chris Redd, Shea Whigham	
O C T O B E R	2	Possessor	Neon / Well Go USA Entertainment / Elevation Pictures / Ingenious Media	Brandon Cronenberg (director/screenplay); Andrea Riseborough, Christopher Abbott, Rossif Sutherland, Tuppence Middleton, Sean Bean, Jennifer Jason Leigh	
O C T O B E R	2	Death of Me	Saban Films	Darren Lynn Bousman (director); Arli Margolis, James Morley III, David Tish (screenplay); Maggie Q, Alex Essoe, Luke Hemsworth	
O C T O B E R	2	The Call	Voltage Pictures / Cinedigm	Timothy Woodward Jr. (director); Patrick Stibbs (screenplay); Lin Shaye, Tobin Bell	
O C T O B E R	6	American Pie Presents: Girls' Rules	Universal Pictures	Mike Elliott (director); David H. Steinberg, Blayne Weaver (screenplay); Madison Pettis, Lizze Broadway, Piper Curda, Natasha Behnam, Darren Barnet, Zachary Gordon	
O C T O B E R	6	The Lie	Amazon Studios / Blumhouse Productions	Veena Sud (director/screenplay); Mireille Enos, Peter Sarsgaard, Joey King	
O C T O B E R	6	Black Box	Amazon Studios / Blumhouse Productions	Emmanuel Osei-Kuffour Jr. (director/screenplay); Stephen Herman (screenplay); Mamoudou Athie, Phylicia Rashad	
O C T O B E R	7	Hubie Halloween	Netflix / Happy Madison Productions	Steven Brill (director); Adam Sandler, Tim Herlihy (screenplay); Adam Sandler, Kevin James, Julie Bowen, Ray Liotta, Rob Schneider, June Squibb, Kenan Thompson, Shaquille O'Neal, Steve Buscemi, Maya Rudolph	
O C T O B E R	7	Books of Blood	Hulu	Brannon Braga (director/screenplay); Adam Simon (screenplay); Britt Robertson, Anna Friel, Rafi Gavron, Yul Vazquez	
O C T O B E R	8	Charm City Kings	HBO Max / Warner Max / Overbrook Entertainment	Angel Manuel Soto (director); Sherman Payne (screenplay); Jahi Di'Allo Winston, Meek Mill, Will Catlett, Teyonah Parris	
O C T O B E R	9	The War with Grandpa	101 Studios / Brookdale Studios	Tim Hill (director); Tom J. Astle, Matt Ember (screenplay); Robert De Niro, Uma Thurman, Rob Riggle, Oakes Fegley, Cheech Marin, Jane Seymour, Christopher Walken	
O C T O B E R	9	A Rainy Day in New York	MPI Media Group	Woody Allen (director/screenplay); Timothée Chalamet, Elle Fanning, Selena Gomez, Jude Law, Diego Luna, Liev Schreiber	
O C T O B E R	9	Yellow Rose	Stage 6 Films	Diane Paragas (director/screenplay); Annie J. Howell, Celena Cipriaso (screenplay); Eva Noblezada, Dale Watson, Princess Punzalan, Lea Salonga	
O C T O B E R	9	The 40-Year-Old Version	Netflix	Radha Blank (director/screenplay); Radha Blank, Peter Kim, Oswin Benjamin, Reed Birney	
O C T O B E R	13	Nocturne	Amazon Studios / Blumhouse Productions	Zu Quirke (director/screenplay); Sydney Sweeney, Madison Iseman, Jacques Colimon, Ivan Shaw	
O C T O B E R	13	Evil Eye	Amazon Studios / Blumhouse Productions	Elan Dassani, Rajeev Dassani (directors); Madhuri Shekar (screenplay); Sarita Choudhury, Sunita Mani, Omar Maskati, Bernard White	
O C T O B E R	15	A Babysitter's Guide to Monster Hunting	Netflix / Walden Media / The Montecito Picture Company	Rachel Talalay (director); Joe Ballarini (screenplay); Tamara Smart, Oona Laurence, Tom Felton, Indya Moore	
O C T O B E R	16	Love and Monsters	Paramount Pictures / Entertainment One / 21 Laps Entertainment	Michael Matthews (director); Matthew Robinson, Brian Duffield (screenplay); Dylan O'Brien, Jessica Henwick, Dan Ewing, Ariana Greenblatt, Michael Rooker	
O C T O B E R	16	Honest Thief	Open Road Films / Briarcliff Entertainment	Mark Williams (director/screenplay); Steve Allrich (screenplay); Liam Neeson, Kate Walsh, Robert Patrick, Anthony Ramos, Jeffrey Donovan, Jai Courtney	
O C T O B E R	16	Clouds	Disney+	Justin Baldoni (director); Kara Holden (screenplay); Fin Argus, Sabrina Carpenter, Madison Iseman, Lil Rel Howery, Neve Campbell, Tom Everett Scott	
O C T O B E R	16	The Devil Has a Name	Momentum Pictures	Edward James Olmos (director); Robert McEveety (screenplay); David Strathairn, Kate Bosworth, Pablo Schreiber, Edward James Olmos, Katie Aselton, Haley Joel Osment, Alfred Molina, Martin Sheen	
O C T O B E R	16	The Kid Detective	Stage 6 Films	Evan Morgan (director/screenplay); Adam Brody, Sophie Nélisse, Tzi Ma, Wendy Crewson, Sarah Sutherland	
O C T O B E R	16	Alone	Lionsgate	Johnny Martin (director); Matt Naylor (screenplay); Tyler Posey, Summer Spiro, Robert Ri'chard, Donald Sutherland	
O C T O B E R	16	2 Hearts	Freestyle Releasing	Lance Hool (director); Veronica Hool, Robin U. Russin (screenplay); Jacob Elordi, Adan Canto, Tiera Skovbye, Radha Mitchell	
O C T O B E R	16	The Opening Act	RLJE Films	Steve Byrne (director/screenplay); Jimmy O. Yang, Alex Moffat, Cedric the Entertainer	
O C T O B E R	20	Tremors: Shrieker Island	Universal Pictures Home Entertainment	Don Michael Paul (director/screenplay); Brian Brightly (screenplay); Michael Gross, Jon Heder	
O C T O B E R	22	The Witches	HBO Max / Warner Bros. Pictures / ImageMovers	Robert Zemeckis (director/screenplay); Kenya Barris, Guillermo del Toro (screenplay); Anne Hathaway, Octavia Spencer, Stanley Tucci, Jahzir Bruno, Codie-Lei Eastick, Kristin Chenoweth, Chris Rock	
O C T O B E R	23	Over the Moon	Netflix / Pearl Studio / Sony Pictures Imageworks	Glen Keane (director); Audrey Wells (screenplay); Cathy Ang, Phillipa Soo, Ken Jeong, John Cho, Ruthie Ann Miles, Margaret Cho, Sandra Oh	
O C T O B E R	23	Borat Subsequent Moviefilm	Amazon Studios	Jason Woliner (director); Peter Baynham, Sacha Baron Cohen, Jena Friedman, Anthony Hines, Lee Kern, Dan Mazer, Erica Rivinoja, Dan Swimer (screenplay); Sacha Baron Cohen, Maria Bakalova	
O C T O B E R	23	After We Collided	Open Road Films / Voltage Pictures	Roger Kumble (director); Anna Todd, Mario Celaya (screenplay); Josephine Langford, Hero Fiennes Tiffin, Dylan Sprouse, Shane Paul McGhie, Candice King, Khadijha Red Thunder, Inanna Sarkis, Samuel Larsen, Selma Blair	
O C T O B E R	23	The Empty Man	20th Century Studios	David Prior (director/screenplay); James Badge Dale, Marin Ireland, Stephen Root, Ron Canada, Robert Aramayo, Joel Courtney, Sasha Frolova	
O C T O B E R	23	Synchronic	XYZ Films / Well Go USA Entertainment	Justin Benson, Aaron Moorhead (directors) Justin Benson (screenplay); Anthony Mackie, Jamie Dornan	
O C T O B E R	23	Bad Hair	Hulu	Justin Simien (director/screenplay); Elle Lorraine, Vanessa Williams, Jay Pharoah, Lena Waithe, Blair Underwood, Laverne Cox	
O C T O B E R	23	Friendsgiving	Saban Films	Nicol Paone (director/screenplay); Malin Åkerman, Kat Dennings, Aisha Tyler, Chelsea Peretti, Ryan Hansen	
O C T O B E R	28	The Craft: Legacy	Columbia Pictures / Blumhouse Productions	Zoe Lister-Jones (director/screenplay); Cailee Spaeny, Gideon Adlon, Lovie Simone, Zoey Luna, Michelle Monaghan, David Duchovny	
O C T O B E R	28	Holidate	Netflix	John Whitesell (director); Tiffany Paulsen (screenplay); Emma Roberts, Luke Bracey, Kristin Chenoweth	
O C T O B E R	30	Come Play	Focus Features / Amblin Partners / Reliance Entertainment	Jacob Chase (director/screenplay); Gillian Jacobs, John Gallagher Jr., Azhy Robertson, Winslow Fegley	
O C T O B E R	30	His House	Netflix / Regency Enterprises / BBC Films	Remi Weekes (director/screenplay); Wunmi Mosaku. Sope Dirisu, Matt Smith	
O C T O B E R	30	Spell	Paramount Pictures / Paramount Players	Mark Tonderai (director); Kurt Wimmer (screenplay); Omari Hardwick, Loretta Devine	
N O V E M B E R	1	Sweet Taste of Souls	TriCoast Entertainment	Terry Ross (director); F. Scott Mudgett (screenplay), Honey Lauren, John Salandria, Mark Valeriano, Amber Gaston, Sarah J. Bartholomew, Thom Michael Mulligan, Frank Papia	
N O V E M B E R	6	Jungleland	Vertical Entertainment / Scott Free Productions	Max Winkler (director/screenplay); Theodore B. Bressman, David Branson Smith (screenplay); Charlie Hunnam, Jack O'Connell, Jessica Barden, Jonathan Majors, John Cullum	
N O V E M B E R	6	Let Him Go	Focus Features	Thomas Bezucha (director/screenplay); Diane Lane, Kevin Costner, Lesley Manville, Will Brittain, Jeffrey Donovan	
N O V E M B E R	6	The Informer	Aviron Pictures / Thunder Road Films	Andrea Di Stefano (director/screenplay); Matt Cook, Rowan Joffe (screenplay); Joel Kinnaman, Rosamund Pike, Common, Ana de Armas, Clive Owen	
N O V E M B E R	6	The Dark and the Wicked	RLJE Films	Bryan Bertino (director/screenplay); Marin Ireland, Michael Abbott Jr., Xander Berkeley	
N O V E M B E R	11	Hillbilly Elegy	Netflix / Imagine Entertainment	Ron Howard (director); Vanessa Taylor (screenplay); Amy Adams, Glenn Close, Gabriel Basso, Haley Bennett, Freida Pinto, Bo Hopkins, Owen Asztalos	
N O V E M B E R	11	Television Event	Impact Partners / Common Room Productions	Jeff Daniels (director); Nicholas Meyer, Stephanie Austen, Ted Koppel, Robert Papazian, Brandon Stoddard	
N O V E M B E R	13	Mank	Netflix	David Fincher (director); Jack Fincher (screenplay); Gary Oldman, Amanda Seyfried, Lily Collins, Arliss Howard, Tom Pelphrey, Sam Troughton, Ferdinand Kingsley, Tuppence Middleton, Tom Burke, Joseph Cross, Jamie McShane, Toby Leonard Moore, Monika Gossmann, Charles Dance	
N O V E M B E R	13	Freaky	Universal Pictures / Blumhouse Productions	Christopher Landon (director/screenplay); Michael Kennedy (screenplay); Vince Vaughn, Kathryn Newton, Katie Finneran, Celeste O'Connor, Misha Osherovich, Alan Ruck	
N O V E M B E R	13	Jingle Jangle: A Christmas Journey	Netflix	David E. Talbert (director/screenplay); Forest Whitaker, Keegan-Michael Key, Hugh Bonneville, Anika Noni Rose, Madalen Mills, Phylicia Rashad, Ricky Martin	
N O V E M B E R	13	Dreamland	Vertical Entertainment	Miles Joris-Peyrafitte (director); Nicolaas Zwart (screenplay); Finn Cole, Margot Robbie, Travis Fimmel, Kerry Condon, Darby Camp, Garrett Hedlund, Lola Kirke	
N O V E M B E R	13	Fatman	Saban Films / Ingenious Media	Eshom Nelms, Ian Nelms (directors/screenplay); Mel Gibson, Walton Goggins, Marianne Jean-Baptiste	
N O V E M B E R	13	The Life Ahead	Netflix	Edoardo Ponti (director/screenplay); Ugo Chiti (screenplay); Sophia Loren, Ibrahima Gueye, Abril Zamora, Renato Carpentieri, Babak Karimi	
N O V E M B E R	13	The Climb	Sony Pictures Classics	Michael Angelo Covino (director/screenplay); Kyle Marvin (screenplay); Kyle Marvin, Michael Angelo Covino, Gayle Rankin, Talia Balsam, George Wendt, Judith Godrèche	
N O V E M B E R	13	Chick Fight	Quiver Distribution / Redbox	Paul Leyden (director); Joseph Downey (screenplay); Malin Åkerman, Bella Thorne, Fortune Feimster, Alec Baldwin	
N O V E M B E R	19	The Princess Switch: Switched Again	Netflix	Michael Rohl (director); Robin Bernheim, Megan Metzger (screenplay); Vanessa Hudgens, Sam Palladio, Nick Sagar	
N O V E M B E R	20	Run	Hulu / Lionsgate	Aneesh Chaganty (director/screenplay); Sev Ohanian (screenplay); Sarah Paulson, Kiera Allen, Pat Healy, Sara Sohn	
N O V E M B E R	20	Sound of Metal	Amazon Studios	Darius Marder (director/screenplay); Abraham Marder (screenplay); Riz Ahmed, Olivia Cooke, Paul Raci, Lauren Ridloff, Mathieu Amalric	
N O V E M B E R	20	The Last Vermeer	TriStar Pictures	Dan Friedkin (director); John Orloff, Mark Fergus and Hawk Ostby (screenplay); Guy Pearce, Claes Bang	
N O V E M B E R	20	Jiu Jitsu	The Avenue Entertainment	Dimitri Logothetis (director/screenplay); James McGrath (screenplay); Alain Moussi, Frank Grillo, JuJu Chan, Tony Jaa, Nicolas Cage	
N O V E M B E R	24	Buddy Games	Saban Films / WWE Studios	Josh Duhamel (director/screenplay); Bob Schwartz, Jude Weng (screenplay); Josh Duhamel, Dax Shepard, Olivia Munn	
N O V E M B E R	25	The Croods: A New Age	Universal Pictures / DreamWorks Animation	Joel Crawford (director); Kevin Hageman, Dan Hageman, Paul Fisher, Bob Logan (screenplay); Nicolas Cage, Emma Stone, Ryan Reynolds, Peter Dinklage, Leslie Mann, Kelly Marie Tran, Catherine Keener, Clark Duke, Cloris Leachman	
N O V E M B E R	25	Happiest Season	Hulu / TriStar Pictures / Entertainment One	Clea DuVall (director/screenplay); Mary Holland (screenplay); Kristen Stewart, Mackenzie Davis, Alison Brie, Aubrey Plaza, Dan Levy, Mary Holland, Victor Garber, Mary Steenburgen	
N O V E M B E R	25	Ma Rainey's Black Bottom	Netflix / Escape Artists	George C. Wolfe (director); Ruben Santiago-Hudson (screenplay); Viola Davis, Chadwick Boseman, Glynn Turman, Colman Domingo, Michael Potts, Jeremy Shamos, Taylour Paige, Dusan Brown, Jonny Coyne	
N O V E M B E R	25	The Christmas Chronicles 2	Netflix / 1492 Pictures	Chris Columbus (director/screenplay); Matt Lieberman (screenplay); Kurt Russell, Goldie Hawn, Darby Camp, Julian Dennison, Jazhir Bruno, Judah Lewis, Kimberly Williams-Paisley, Tyrese Gibson, Andrew Morgado	
N O V E M B E R	25	Uncle Frank	Amazon Studios / Miramax	Alan Ball (director/screenplay); Paul Bettany, Sophia Lillis, Peter Macdissi, Judy Greer, Steve Zahn, Lois Smith, Margo Martindale, Stephen Root	
N O V E M B E R	25	Folklore: The Long Pond Studio Sessions	Disney+	Taylor Swift (director/screenplay); Taylor Swift, Jack Antonoff, Aaron Dessner, Justin Vernon	
N O V E M B E R	26	Superintelligence	HBO Max / Warner Max / New Line Cinema	Ben Falcone (director); Steve Mallory (screenplay); Melissa McCarthy, Bobby Cannavale, Brian Tyree Henry, Jean Smart, James Corden	
N O V E M B E R	27	Black Beauty	Disney+ / Constantin Film / JB Pictures	Ashley Avis (director/screenplay); Mackenzie Foy, Kate Winslet, Claire Forlani, Fern Deacon, Iain Glen	
D E C E M B E R	4	The Prom	Netflix	Ryan Murphy (director); Chad Beguelin, Bob Martin (screenplay); Meryl Streep, James Corden, Jo Ellen Pellman, Nicole Kidman, Keegan-Michael Key, Andrew Rannells, Ariana DeBose, Kerry Washington	
D E C E M B E R	4	All My Life	Universal Pictures	Marc Meyers (director); Todd Rosenberg (screenplay); Jessica Rothe, Harry Shum Jr., Kyle Allen, Chrissie Fit, Jay Pharoah, Marielle Scott, Keala Settle	
D E C E M B E R	4	Godmothered	Disney+ / Walt Disney Pictures	Sharon Maguire (director); Kari Granlund, Melissa Stack (screenplay); Isla Fisher, Jillian Bell, Santiago Cabrera	
D E C E M B E R	4	Half Brothers	Focus Features	Luke Greenfield (director); Eduardo Cisneros, Jason Shuman (screenplay); Luis Gerardo Méndez, Connor Del Rio	
D E C E M B E R	4	Wander	Saban Films	April Mullen (director); Tim Doiron (screenplay); Aaron Eckhart, Katheryn Winnick, Heather Graham, Roger Dorman, Tommy Lee Jones	
D E C E M B E R	4	Black Bear	Momentum Pictures	Lawrence Michael Levine (director/screenplay); Aubrey Plaza, Christopher Abbott, Sarah Gadon	
D E C E M B E R	10	Let Them All Talk	HBO Max / Warner Max	Steven Soderbergh (director); Deborah Eisenberg (screenplay); Meryl Streep, Candice Bergen, Gemma Chan, Lucas Hedges, Dianne Wiest	
D E C E M B E R	11	The Midnight Sky	Netflix / Smokehouse Pictures	George Clooney (director); Mark L. Smith (screenplay); George Clooney, Felicity Jones, David Oyelowo, Tiffany Boone, Demián Bichir, Kyle Chandler, Caoilinn Springall	
D E C E M B E R	11	Songbird	STX Films / Platinum Dunes	Adam Mason (director/screenplay); Simon Boyes (screenplay); KJ Apa, Sofia Carson, Craig Robinson, Bradley Whitford, Peter Stormare, Alexandra Daddario, Paul Walter Hauser, Demi Moore	
D E C E M B E R	11	Wild Mountain Thyme	Bleecker Street / Likely Story	John Patrick Shanley (director/screenplay); Emily Blunt, Jamie Dornan, Jon Hamm, Dearbhla Molloy, Christopher Walken	
D E C E M B E R	11	Safety	Disney+ / Walt Disney Pictures	Reginald Hudlin (director); Nick Santora (screenplay); Jay Reeves, Thaddeus J. Mixson, Corinne Foxx, Matthew Glave, James Badge Dale	
D E C E M B E R	11	Wander Darkly	Lionsgate	Tara Miele (director/screenplay); Sienna Miller, Diego Luna, Beth Grant, Aimee Carrero, Tory Kittles, Vanessa Bayer	
D E C E M B E R	11	I'm Your Woman	Amazon Studios	Julia Hart (director/screenplay); Jordan Horowitz (screenplay); Rachel Brosnahan, Arinzé Kene, Marsha Stephanie Blake, Bill Heck, Frankie Faison	
D E C E M B E R	11	The Stand In	Saban Films	Jamie Babbit (director); Sam Bain (screenplay); Drew Barrymore, Michael Zegen, T.J. Miller, Holland Taylor	
D E C E M B E R	11	Archenemy	Voltage Pictures / RLJE Films	Adam Egypt Mortimer (director/screenplay); Joe Manganiello, Skylan Brooks, Zolee Griggs, Paul Scheer, Amy Seimetz, Glenn Howerton	
D E C E M B E R	11	Farewell Amor	IFC Midnight	Ekwa Msangi (director/screenplay); Ntare Mwine, Zainab Jah, Jayme Lawson, Joie Lee	
D E C E M B E R	18	Monster Hunter	Screen Gems / Constantin Film / Tencent Pictures / Toho / AB2 Digital Pictures	Paul W. S. Anderson (director/screenplay); Milla Jovovich, Tony Jaa, Tip "T.I." Harris, Meagan Good, Diego Boneta, Josh Helman, Jin Au-Yeung, Ron Perlman	
D E C E M B E R	18	Greenland	STX Films / Thunder Road Films	Ric Roman Waugh (director); Chris Sparling (screenplay); Gerard Butler, Morena Baccarin, David Denman, Hope Davis, Roger Dale Floyd, Andrew Bachelor, Merrin Dungey, Holt McCallany, Scott Glenn	
D E C E M B E R	18	Fatale	Lionsgate	Deon Taylor (director); David Loughery (screenplay); Hilary Swank, Michael Ealy, Mike Colter, Geoffrey Owens, Denise Dowse	
D E C E M B E R	18	Skylines	Vertical Entertainment / XYZ Films / Ingenious Media	Liam O'Donnell (director/screenplay); Lindsey Morgan, Jonathan Howard, Daniel Bernhardt, Rhona Mitra, James Cosmo, Alexander Siddig	
D E C E M B E R	18	Hunter Hunter	IFC Midnight	Shawn Linden (director/screenplay); Devon Sawa, Camille Sullivan, Nick Stahl, Summer H. Howell	
D E C E M B E R	18	Breach	Saban Films	John Suits (director); Edward John Drake, Corey William Large (screenplay); Cody Kearsley, Bruce Willis, Thomas Jane	
D E C E M B E R	21	Ariana Grande: Excuse Me, I Love You	Netflix	Paul Dugdale (director); Ariana Grande	
D E C E M B E R	23	Sylvie's Love	Amazon Studios	Eugene Ashe (director/screenplay); Tessa Thompson, Nnamdi Asomugha, Ryan Michelle Bathe, Aja Naomi King, Eva Longoria	
D E C E M B E R	25	Wonder Woman 1984	Warner Bros. Pictures / DC Films / Atlas Entertainment / The Stone Quarry / HBO Max	Patty Jenkins (director/screenplay); Geoff Johns, David Callaham (screenplay); Gal Gadot, Chris Pine, Kristen Wiig, Pedro Pascal, Robin Wright, Connie Nielsen	
D E C E M B E R	25	Soul	Disney+ / Walt Disney Pictures / Pixar Animation Studios	Pete Docter (director/screenplay); Mike Jones, Kemp Powers (screenplay); Jamie Foxx, Tina Fey, Graham Norton, Rachel House, Alice Braga, Richard Ayoade, Phylicia Rashad, Donnell Rawlings, Questlove, Angela Bassett, Daveed Diggs, Wes Studi, Fortune Feimster, Zenobia Shroff	
D E C E M B E R	25	We Can Be Heroes	Netflix / Troublemaker Studios / Double R Productions	Robert Rodriguez (director/screenplay); Priyanka Chopra Jonas, Pedro Pascal, YaYa Gosselin, Boyd Holbrook, Adriana Barraza, Haley Reinhart, Sung Kang, Taylor Dooley, Christian Slater	
D E C E M B E R	25	News of the World	Universal Pictures / Playtone / Perfect World Pictures	Paul Greengrass (director/screenplay); Luke Davies (screenplay); Tom Hanks, Helena Zengel	
D E C E M B E R	25	One Night in Miami...	Amazon Studios	Regina King (director); Kemp Powers (screenplay); Kingsley Ben-Adir, Eli Goree, Aldis Hodge, Leslie Odom Jr., Lance Reddick, Joaquina Kalukango, Nicolette Robinson, Beau Bridges, Lance Reddick	
D E C E M B E R	25	Promising Young Woman	Focus Features / FilmNation Entertainment	Emerald Fennell (director/screenplay); Carey Mulligan, Bo Burnham, Alison Brie, Clancy Brown, Jennifer Coolidge, Laverne Cox, Connie Britton	
D E C E M B E R	30	Pieces of a Woman	Netflix / Bron Studios	Kornél Mundruczó (director); Kata Wéber (screenplay); Vanessa Kirby, Shia LaBeouf, Molly Parker, Sarah Snook, Iliza Shlesinger, Benny Safdie, Jimmie Fails, Ellen Burstyn	

== See also ==
- List of 2020 box office number-one films in the United States
- 2020 in the United States
- Impact of the COVID-19 pandemic on cinema
- List of films impacted by the COVID-19 pandemic
