= Roberta Morris Purdee =

American film producer and documentarian

- Born: Roberta Morris; Kansas City, Missouri, U.S.
- Occupations: Film producer and Documentarian
- Years active: 1980–present
- Parents: Nancy Kopplin Morris; Robert Morris

Roberta Morris Purdee (born September 3) is an American film producer and documentarian.

== Early life and education ==
Purdee was born in Kansas City, Missouri, and was raised by single mother Nancy Kopplin Morris throughout the midwestern United States. She became a member of the first graduating class of Columbine High School, graduating early. She studied early childhood education in college.

== Personal life ==
In her late teens she married Nathan Purdee. The two supported themselves through college by working as bounty hunters in Denver, Colorado. They eventually moved to Los Angeles so that Purdee could pursue a career as an actor. The two divorced in the 1980s, but remarried in 1991 and moved to New York City to begin Purdee's tenure on One Life to Live and raise their newborn son Taylor A. Purdee. As of 2019 she resides in Pennsylvania with her husband.

== Career ==
After moving to Los Angeles Morris Purdee began working as assistant to Academy Award winning actor/director Lee Grant. While spending the next few years assisting Grant and fellow Oscar nominee Brenda Vaccaro, she became a script reader within the Hollywood Studio System before moving to New York to work as production coordinator on a number of studio films, independent films, television films, and documentaries.

While continuing to work with Grant and husband Joseph Feury she began producing films, and eventually opened her own production company with her husband Nathan Purdee. The two groups worked together on a number of documentaries and narrative films for HBO, Lifetime, PBS, and Disney.

In the late 90s Purdee's Karmic Release Ltd. began to strike out on its own, producing the documentary film Wallowitch & Ross: This Moment, an intimate, musical portrait of New York Cabaret legend John Wallowitch and partner Bertram Ross, who had been Martha Graham's star dancer and co-director of the Graham Company. Directed by her brother Richard Morris and crediting both his wife, costume designer Sue Gandy and Nathan Purdee as producers as well, Wallowitch & Ross: This Moment went on to be shortlisted for the 1999 Academy Award for Best Documentary Feature.

Morris Purdee teamed up again with Feury/Grant in the early 2000s to produce "...A Father...A Son...Once Upon a Time in Hollywood", the story of the Douglas Hollywood dynasty begun by Kirk Douglas, and the groundbreaking Baghdad ER for HBO, which went on to win 4 Emmys, a Peabody, and the Dupont-Columbia.

During this era Morris Purdee also produced a series of specials for Sesame Workshop and the documentary Praying with Lior, and worked with Jonathan Caouette on his seminal film Tarnation. Her solutions to the political and logistical struggles faced while producing Baghdad ER and the extensive roadblocks faced when clearing rights to the near endless pop culture imagery that is woven into the fabric of Tarnation have been lectured on at Yale and Lehigh University.

In 2011 she began working more closely with son Taylor A. Purdee. The two have produced two feature length films together: the documentary This is Honduras, and the musical film Killian & the Comeback Kids, which stars both Taylor and Nathan Purdee, as well as a number of specials, shorts, and re-releases. The features, both directed by Taylor, were expected to be released theatrically in 2020.

In 2014 Blue Rider Press published Lee Grant's memoirs as I Said Yes To Everything, edited by Morris Purdee. The two began work on the book in 2009. The book has seen multiple printings and been placed on the Entertainment Weekly "Must List," Apple's "Best of 2014," and been named an Editor's Favorite book by Amazon.
