= Female Perversions =

1996 American film by Susan Streitfeld

- Theatrical release poster
- Directed by: Susan Streitfeld
- Screenplay by: Julie Hébert; Susan Streitfeld
- Based on: Female Perversions: The Temptations of Emma Bovary by Louise J. Kaplan
- Produced by: Mindy Affrime
- Starring: Tilda Swinton; Amy Madigan; Karen Sillas; Frances Fisher; Laila Robins; Paulina Porizkova; Clancy Brown
- Cinematography: Teresa Medina
- Edited by: Curtiss Clayton; Leo Trombetta
- Music by: Debbie Wiseman
- Production companies: Trans Atlantic Entertainment; ARD Degeto Film; Starhaus Filmproduktion
- Distributed by: Hope Runs High: October Films
- Release dates: January 22, 1996 (Sundance); November 21, 1996 (Germany); April 25, 1997 (United States)
- Running time: 120 minutes
- Countries: United States; Germany
- Language: English
- Box office: $926,954

Female Perversions is a 1996 erotic drama film directed by Susan Streitfeld (in her feature directorial debut), based on the 1991 book Female Perversions: The Temptations of Emma Bovary by American psychoanalyst Louise J. Kaplan. It stars Tilda Swinton in her first American film, Amy Madigan, Karen Sillas, Frances Fisher, Laila Robins, Paulina Porizkova, and Clancy Brown. Aspects of female psychology, particularly the more morbid, are explored through the interactions of the characters and their fantasies.

== Plot ==
Eve Stephens, a Los Angeles trial attorney, is almost at the peak of her career: being appointed as a judge. Her private life is less successful. Beneath her cool exterior, Eve is filled with self-doubt and struggles to find satisfaction while conforming to society's expectations of her as a woman. She is troubled by erotic nightmares and flashbacks to the lives of her parents, centering on her unfeeling father and the suspicious death of her mother, Beth. Although she has occasional intense sex – initially with a male geologist called John, later with a female psychiatrist, Renee – the relationships lack warmth or commitment on her part. She also feels threatened by Langley Flynn, a younger woman being lined up to replace her as an attorney.

Eve's professional and personal lives start to unravel when her intelligent but disturbed sister Maddie, a doctoral student whom Eve believes to be a kleptomaniac, is arrested for repeated shoplifting. After Eve bails her out, Maddie steals the "lucky suit" that Eve planned to wear to her interview with the California Governor about her potential judgeship. During the interview, Eve's anger toward Maddie manifests itself when she tells the Governor that she has no time for family. Feeling disadvantaged as a candidate by her status as an unmarried woman, Eve fears that this admission will cost her the appointment, and subsequently flies into a rage. The two sisters begin to recognize the malignant influence of their parents on their lives and the unsatisfactory responses they unconsciously adopted, one seeking compensation by stealing and the other by sex.

In the end, the Governor approves Eve's appointment. Later, Eve comes to the aid of Maddie's neighbor Edwina ("Ed"), a tomboyish 13‑year‑old who uses self‑harm to cope with the struggles of puberty. As Ed prepares to attempt suicide by jumping off a cliff, Eve runs up behind her and pulls her back from the edge. The last shot is of Ed's face pressed into Eve's lap.

== Cast ==
- Tilda Swinton as Eve Stephens
- Amy Madigan as Maddie Stephens
  - Kirstie Tyrone as young Maddie
- Karen Sillas as Renee
- Frances Fisher as Annunciata
- Clancy Brown as John
- Laila Robins as Emma
- John Diehl as Jake Rock
- Paulina Porizkova as Langley Flynn
- Dale Shuger as Edwina
- Sandy Martin as Trudy
- Marcia Cross as Beth Stephens
- John Cassini as gas station attendant
- Shawnee Smith as make-up salesgirl

== Production ==
I studied...painting, at Syracuse University before...moving to Mexico. There, I was introduced to Latin American literature... in Mexico I became friends with a woman whose brother was a cinematographer...I came back to the States, I went to NYU film school." - Susan Streitfeld

== Reception ==
On the review aggregator website Rotten Tomatoes, 67% of 21 critics' reviews are positive. The film was rated 5 out of 5 by Peter Bradshaw, 4 out of 5 by The Austin Chronicle, 3.5 out of 4 by Roger Ebert, and 3 out of 5 by Empire magazine. Entertainment Weekly gave it a C grade.

"For a film this acutely attuned to contemporary sexual politics and feminism, the lame falling back on a psychological answer to Eve's troubles is tantamount to mounting a sophisticated argument that ends up missing the point." – Stephen Holden, nytimes.com

In 2024 the film received a 4K restoration from Vinegar Syndrome/Cinématographe and Hope Runs High, followed by a theatrical re-release by Hope Runs High in early 2025. The restored version was truer to Streitfeld's original edit and was hailed as a notable rediscovery, making numerous end of year lists.
