= Homeovestism =

Erotic interest in gender-typical clothing

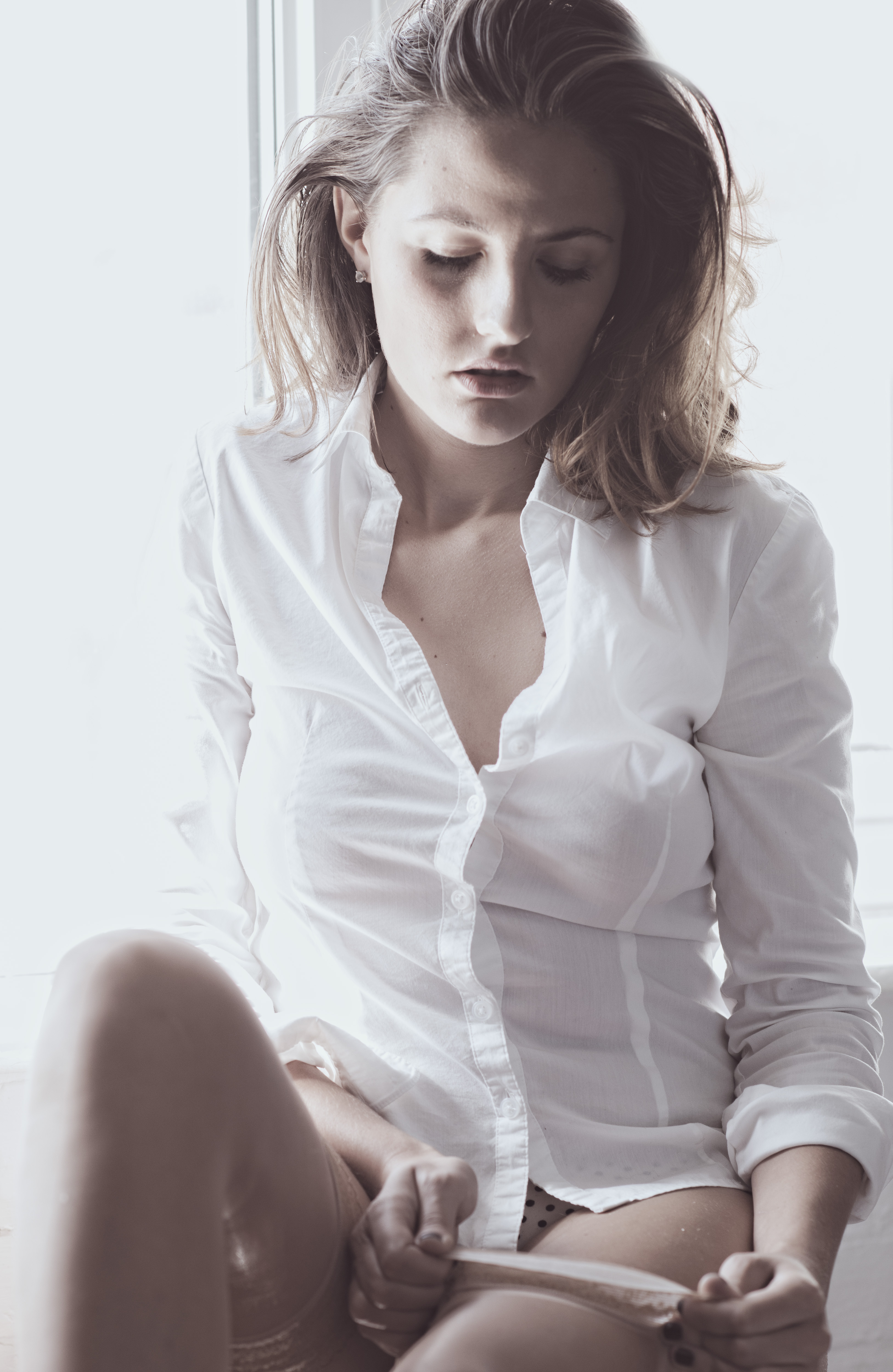
Example of female sexual arousal triggered by wearing one's own clothes.

Homeovestism is a concept referring to the sexual arousal experienced by an individual when wearing clothing typical of their own gender. It is the counterpart of transvestic fetishism.

== Definition ==
Formally termed homeovestism, this concept was initially identified by George Zavitzianos and later developed by Louise J. Kaplan to describe the sexual arousal experienced by certain individuals when wearing clothing typical of their own gender, in contrast to transvestic fetishism, in which sexual arousal arises from wearing clothing typical of the opposite sex.

The attire of a homeovestite shows certain characteristics: men wear hyper-masculine clothing, while women dress and apply makeup in an exaggeratedly feminine manner. They perceive themselves as individuals who, unconsciously, experience a homoerotic connection with the image of the gender they imitate through their clothing.

According to Louise Kaplan's book Female Perversions (1991), homeovestism represents "a personification (impersonation) of the idealized phallic father" of the same sex, "to overcome embarrassing and frightening identifications with the opposite gender (cross-gender)."

== See also ==
- Transvestism
- Transvestic fetishism
