= Princess Katie & Racer Steve =

American singer

Princess Katie & Racer Steve was an indie Rock & Roll band for children. Based in NYC, Princess Katie & Racer Steve wrote, recorded and performed music for children and families with their band which included Crash the Drummer, Super Chef Jeff, Judo Champ Billy Asai and Space on Bass. Princess Katie is Katie O'Sullivan and Racer Steve is Steve Borne. Both are New York City natives. Princess Katie is the singer of the band and Racer Steve plays the electric guitar. The band also features a 3-piece horn section at some shows.

== Biography ==
Princess Katie & Racer Steve began making music for children quite by accident. For several years Katie & Steve made volunteer visits to local children's hospitals and at events for at risk children dressed up in costumes of famous and notable characters from TV and movies. They regularly visited children's hospitals dressed as Shrek and Fiona, The Incredibles, holiday elves, and as SpongeBob and Spider-Man. In 2007 they were profiled in the New York Daily News in a regular feature called, "Big Town, Big Heart" Katie & Steve decided that it would be fun to entertain these kids through song and the characters of Princess Katie & Racer Steve were born. In 2008 the band's second album, "Fast & Feisty" was named one of the top 10 children's music albums of the year by Cookie Magazine. The band was also voted "2009's Best Kid's Entertainers in New York City" by Nickelodeon and ParentsConnect readers. Songs For The Coolest Kids was selected as a "Favorite Thing" by Disney's Family Fun Magazine. Songs for The Coolest Kids and Fast & Feisty were also editor's picks in Parenting Magazine.

In 2009, they were part of Bethlehem, Pennsylvania's Musikfest. Princess Katie & Racer Steve have recorded and released 4 albums and one live concert DVD.

== Works ==
=== Albums ===
- Songs for the Coolest Kids (2007)
- Fast & Feisty (2008)
- Tiny Cool (2010)
- Love Cake and Monsters (2013)

=== Videos ===
- "Revved Up & Ready to Rock" (2009)
