= Lehigh Valley Charter High School for the Arts =

Location
- 321 East 3rd Street; Bethlehem, Pennsylvania 18105; United States; 40.6120491027832°N 75.37539672851562°W

Information
- Type: Charter arts school
- Established: September 2003
- NCES District ID: 4200099
- President: Christina Lincoln, Superintendent and CEO
- Principal: Jennifer Levernier
- Faculty: 58.69 (on an FTE basis)
- Enrollment: 550 (2024-25)
- Student to teacher ratio: 9.37
- Campus type: Small City
- Website: www.charterarts.org

Lehigh Valley Charter High School for the Arts, or Charter Arts, is an audition-based, tuition-free public charter school located in downtown Bethlehem, Pennsylvania, in the Lehigh Valley region of eastern Pennsylvania. As of the 2022-23 school year, the school had an enrollment of 550 students, according to National Center for Education Statistics data.

The school first opened in September 2003 under the name Lehigh Valley Charter High School for the Performing Arts or LVPA prior to changing to its current name in 2012, abbreviated LVCA. Students major in one of seven artistic areas: dance, theatre, instrumental music, vocal music, visual art, literary arts, or production arts. As of the 2019-2020 school year, figure skating is no longer a major.

Students commute to the school daily from over 40 surrounding Pennsylvania school districts.

The school has core courses at the College Preparatory (CP), Honors, and Advanced Placement (AP) levels. The course catalog consists of more than 200 courses ranging from traditional core courses to comprehensive courses in the arts. Advanced placement courses are available in English, Math, American History, Science, Art History, Music Theory and Spanish.

In September 2015, the school opened a new 87,000 square-foot facility.

== Notable alumni ==
- Sasha Joseph Neulinger, actor, Shallow Hal
- Taylor A. Purdee, director, Killian & the Comeback Kids
