= Joanne Beretta =

American singer (1933–2020)

- Joanne Beretta, from a 1963 newspaper.
- Born: November 14, 1933; Oakland, California, U.S.
- Died: July 24, 2020 (aged 86); New York City, New York, U.S.
- Other name: Joanne Bufano
- Occupation: Cabaret singer

Joanne Beretta (November 14, 1933 – July 24, 2020) was an American cabaret singer.

== Early life ==
Beretta was born in Oakland, California, the daughter of Louis Joseph Beretta and Mary C. O'Neill Beretta. Her father was born to Italian immigrants in Canada, and her mother was born in Ireland. She graduated from Fremont High School and attended San Francisco State University, but left to begin a singing career.

== Career ==
Beretta was a cabaret singer based first in San Francisco, and for most of her career in New York. Early in her career she worked with composer John Wallowitch and singer Johnny Mathis; she was also associated with Tommy Tune and actress Kathleen Chalfant in her career. "Clubs are probably the best training anyone could possibly have," she told an interviewer in 1978. "If you can handle a nightclub audience, you can handle just about anything." Her voice in the 1970s was described as "exceptional in its purity, flexibility, control, and shading."

On stage, Beretta appeared in New Faces of 1962, Three Cheers for the Tired Businessman (1963), The Threepenny Opera, Little Mary Sunshine, The Skin of Our Teeth, and A Funny Thing Happened on the Way to the Forum (1965). Beretta recorded a live album, Joanne Beretta Sings at the Madeira Club (1967). She won an Obie Award for her portrayal of a male character in The Club (1976), and she sang a leading role in Doc and Lola (1978), directed by her husband, Rocco Bufano. She stopped performing in 1978, and turned full-time to design work. She made a return to the microphone in 2006, and recorded a comeback album, Love Life (2006), with pianist Franklin Roosevelt Underwood and bassist John Beal as her accompanists.

== Personal life ==
Beretta married writer and director Rocco Bufano in 1958; they separated but were still married when he died in 1989. She died after a fall in July 2020, aged 86 years, in New York. She was included in the Episcopal Actors' Guild's annual memorial list.
