= Baghdad ER =

- DVD cover for Baghdad ER
- Directed by: Jon Alpert, Matthew O'Neill
- Original language: English

Production
- Producers: Jon Alpert, Joseph Feury, Roberta Morris Purdee, and Matthew O'Neill
- Running time: 64 minutes
- Production company: HBO Documentary Films

Original release
- Network: HBO
- Release: May 21, 2006

Baghdad ER is a documentary released by HBO on May 21, 2006. It shows the Iraq War from the perspective of a military hospital in Baghdad. It has some relatively disturbing scenes in it (e.g. amputations), therefore the U.S. Army is officially warning that military personnel watching it could experience symptoms of post-traumatic stress disorder (PTSD).

After being given a Peabody Award, the show was featured in the April 13, 2007 broadcast of NPR's Fresh Air.

== Awards and nominations ==
=== Awards ===
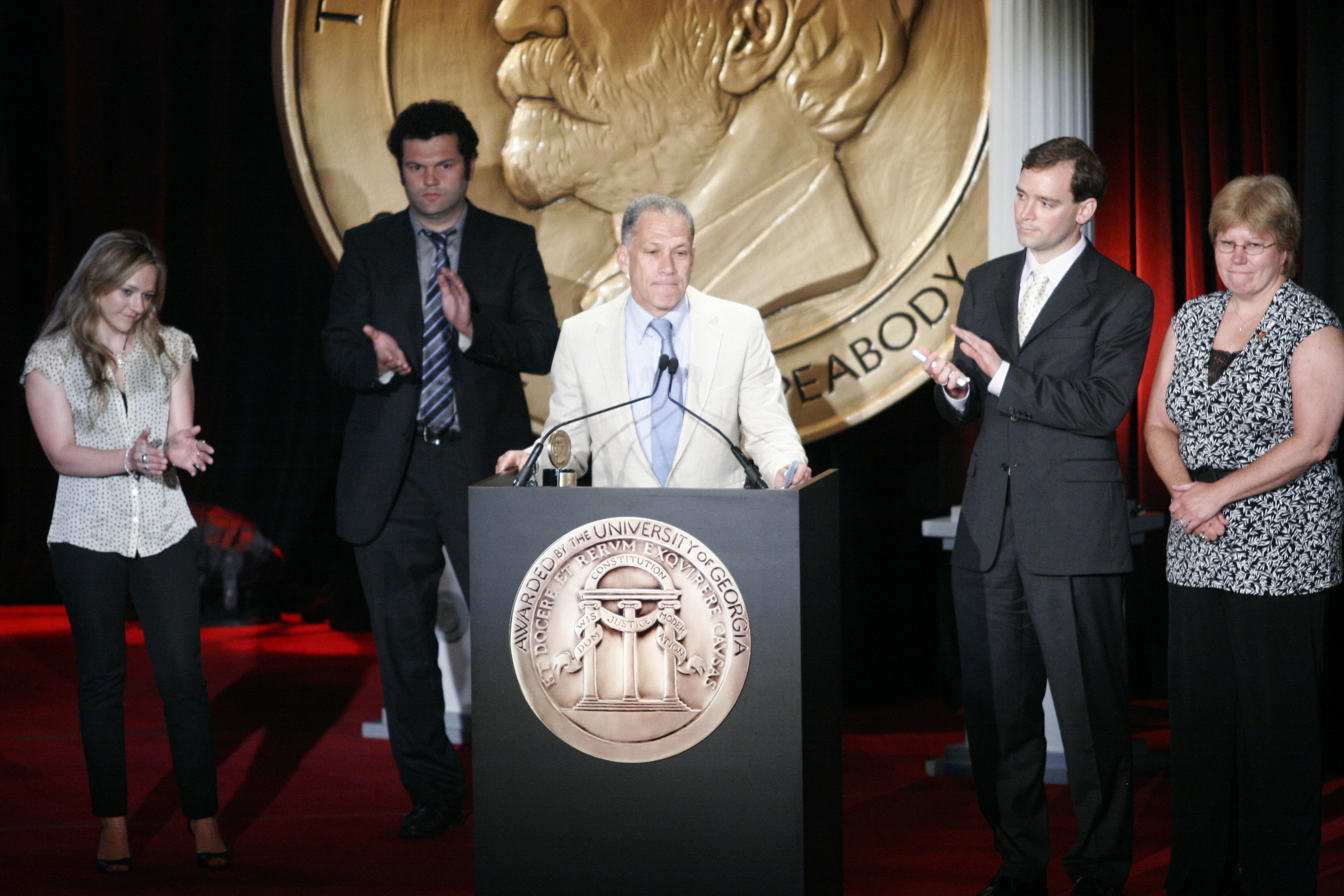
Carrie Goldman, Patrick McMahon, Jon Alpert and Matthew O'Neill accept the Peabody Award, June 2007. On the right: Paula Zwillinger, mother of a fallen marine

- Emmy Awards:
  - Exceptional Merit in Nonfiction Filmmaking
  - Outstanding Cinematography for Nonfiction Programming – Single-Camera
  - Outstanding Directing for Nonfiction Programming
  - Outstanding Sound Editing for Nonfiction Programming – Single or Multi-Camera
- Peabody Award
  - 2006

=== Nominations ===
- American Cinema Editors Awards:
  - Best Edited Documentary Film
- Emmy Awards:
  - Outstanding Picture Editing for Nonfiction Programming – Single-Camera
  - Outstanding Sound Mixing for Nonfiction Programming – Single or Multi-Camera
