= Bertram Ross =

American dancer

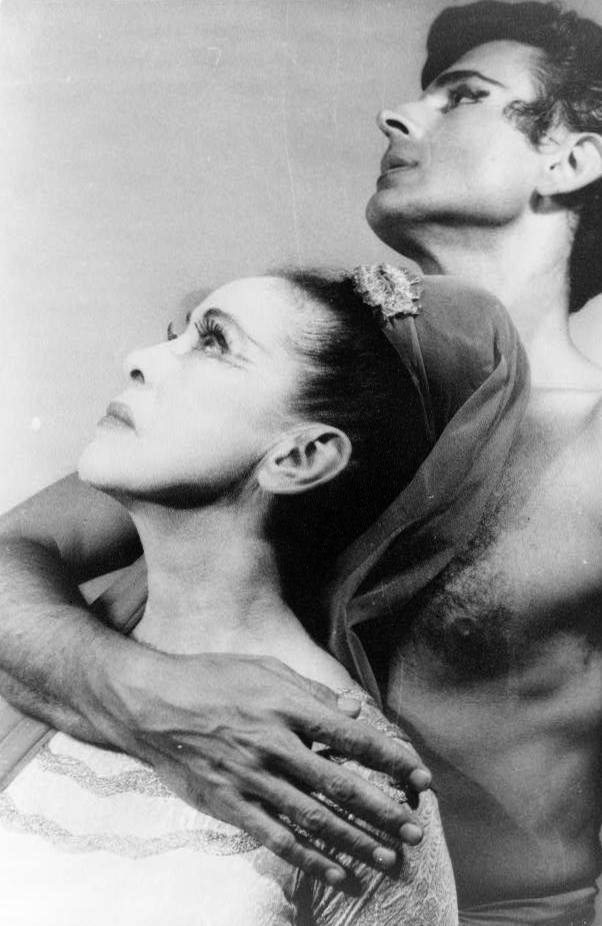
- Bertram Ross with Martha Graham
- Born: November 14, 1920; New York City, US
- Died: April 20, 2003 (aged 82); New York City, US
- Resting place: Kensico Cemetery, Valhalla, New York
- Known for: Dance and choreography
- Movement: Modern dance
- Partner: John Wallowitch

Bertram Ross (November 14, 1920 – April 20, 2003) was an American dancer best known for his work with the Martha Graham Dance Company, with which he performed for two decades. He was Martha Graham’s longtime dance partner and the originator of male roles in most of her major ballets from the 1950s and 1960s, including Adam in Embattled Garden, and both Agamemnon and Orestes in Clytemnestra. After leaving Graham's company, Ross taught, choreographed and formed his own dance company. In later life, he toured in a cabaret duo with his real life partner, the composer and pianist John Wallowitch.

== Early life ==
Ross was born Bertram Ross Prensky in Brooklyn, New York. He was introduced to the performing arts at an early age. At the urging of his mother, he studied piano, but initially was more interested in painting. He attended Oberlin College, then spent World War II as a mapmaker for the Army. In 1947, he returned to New York to continue painting studies at the Art Students League. Shortly thereafter, he discovered Martha Graham.

== Dance career ==
Ross began taking classes at Martha Graham's School under the GI Bill. When he received a scholarship from Connecticut College he took dance classes there as the first male student, then toured briefly with the Dudley-Maslow-Bales Dance Trio.

In 1949, Graham invited Ross to join her company. In 1953, he first partnered her as Oedipus, to her Jocasta, in the ballet Night Journey. Merce Cunningham had left the troupe in 1951, so she needed replacements for some of his roles. Graham was 59 years of age at the time, Ross, 33. Ross' superb technique, powerful, dignified stage presence, and craggy good looks, also garnered him lead parts in many of Graham's new choreographic works. Among these were Adam in Embattled Garden, St. Michael in Seraphic Dialogue, Agamemnon and Orestes in Clytemnestra and Brother Sun in Canticle For Innocent Comedians. In total, Ross originated 35 roles in the repertory.

Critics described some of his characters in Graham's psychosexual dramas as "colorful and even lurid." The dancer himself is quoted as saying, "Every night and twice on matinee days I was beaten, beheaded, blinded and castrated - and it was wonderful! I never missed a performance."

A few of the performances are documented:

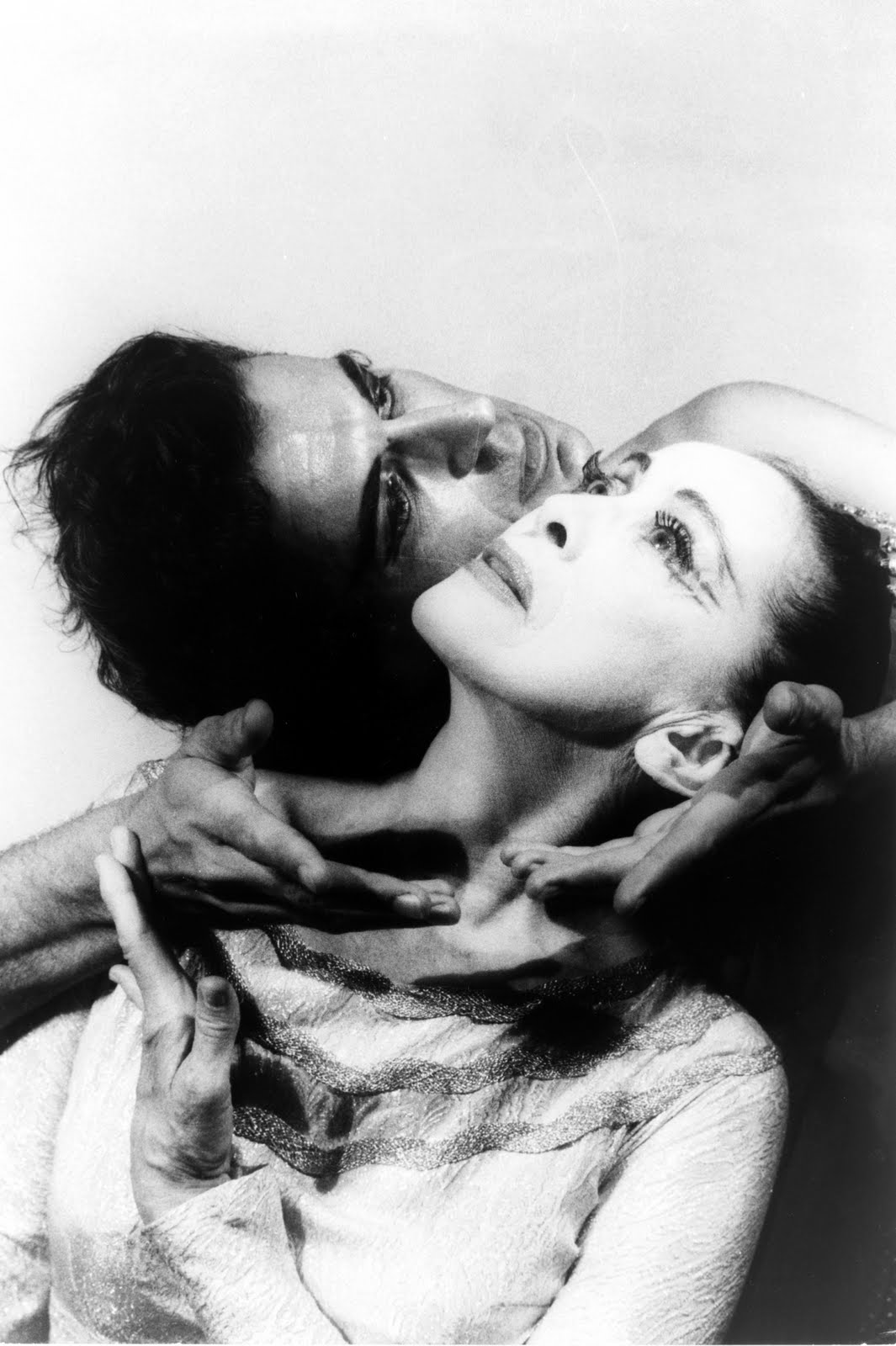
Martha Graham Bertram Ross 1961

Appalachian Spring (1958) - Graham's Appalachian Spring was filmed for television and presented by WQED Pittsburgh. The cast includes Graham as The Bride, Ross as The Revivalist, Stuart Hodes as The Husbandman, Matt Turney as the Pioneer Woman, and Yuriko, Helen McGehee, Ethel Winter, Miriam Cole as The Revivalist's Flock. The piece features an original score by Aaron Copland. A Dancer's World (1957 TV movie documentary) - Another documentary filmed and initially aired by WQED. Designed as an introduction to Graham's work and narrated by the choreographer, the film shows the company in the studio demonstrating various aspects of her creative approach and technique. Martha Graham: An American Original in Performance (1957 documentary) - The 90-minute film includes three historic performances, A Dancer's World, Appalachian Spring and Night Journey, the legend of Oedipus with Ross in the starring role.

Night Journey (1960 documentary short) - The black and white film by Austrian director Alexander Hammid was released as part of a monograph, Films on Ballet and Modern Dance: Notes and a Directory, published by the American Dance Guild. Martha Graham: The Dancer Revealed, American Masters (1994 TV Series documentary) - The documentary chronicles Graham's life and work. Ross and former company members, among others, provide commentary.

In 1966, when Martha Graham fell ill, Ross was named co-director of the company, first with Robert Cohan, then with Mary Hinkson, both veteran Graham dancers. Ross and Hinkson kept both the troupe and school operating during Graham's absence. Both resigned when she returned with a new director, non-dancer Ronald Protas. Ross left the company in 1973, reportedly due to artistic differences with Protas.

== After Graham ==
After leaving the Martha Graham Dance Company, Ross performed as a guest artist with other dance companies, taught Graham technique and choreographed. Ross held classes at Juilliard, New York University and the Mary Anthony Studio. During the 1970s and 1980s, he toured with his own troupe, Bertram Ross Dance Company, for which he created dances such as Totem and Vanya: Three Pastels. Ross also staged solo dance-theater projects, including Noah and Raymond Duncan, a portrait of Isadora Duncan's brother. After Graham’s death, he re-created several of her pieces for the Graham company.

He also took on a few acting roles. In 1961, he appeared as the character Haman in an episode titled Esther on the Lamp Unto My Feet TV series. In 1962, he performed in one episode, Splendour in the Rice, on the Canadian comedy series The Wayne and Shuster Hour. In the Amy Greenfield film Antigone/Rites of Passion, he performed the dual roles of Oedipus and Creon.

In 1973, he made his debut as a singer, when he jokingly performed with Wallowitch at the 10th anniversary of The Ballroom. Ross sang a comic Irving Berlin number Cohen Owes Me $97, which he intoned in the thick Yiddish accent for which Berlin had written it. Audience response was so overwhelming, the club's owner suggested the pair form a duo.

In 1984, Ross and Wallowitch began performing the two-man cabaret act, which included lesser-known songs by Rodgers and Hart, Johnny Mercer and Harold Arlen, combined with Wallowitch's musical parodies. They launched the routine at The Ballroom, then took it on the road across the U.S. and to London, where they appeared at Pizza on the Park, the venerable (now-closed) jazz venue. Not long before Ross' death, November 2002, the pair appeared at Danny's Skylight Room in Manhattan.

Filmmaker Richard Morris captured the couple's 30+ year personal and professional union for the 1999 film Wallowitch & Ross: This Moment. A CD of their cabaret act Wallowitch and Ross (Miranda Music) was released in 2003 to accompany the film. In 2016, "Wallowitch & Ross: This Moment" was entered into the American Academy of Motion Picture Arts and Sciences film archive for permanent preservation.

== Personal life ==
Ross made no secret of his homosexuality. He met Wallowitch through mutual friends in the arts community; both were already familiar with each other's work. They lived together for more than 35 years. Ross died from pneumonia on April 20, 2003. He had also suffered from Parkinson's disease in later years. Ross is buried beside Wallowitch, who died in 2007, at Kensico Cemetery in Valhalla, New York.
