= Wallowitch & Ross: This Moment =

- Directed by: Richard Morris
- Produced by: Roberta Morris Purdee; Nathan Purdee; Sue Gandy
- Distributed by: First Run Features
- Release date: 1998
- Running time: 77 minutes
- Country: United States
- Language: English

Wallowitch & Ross: This Moment is a 1998 American documentary musical film directed by Richard Morris. The film follows acclaimed composer and cabaret performer John Wallowitch and partner Bertram Ross, Martha Graham's lead dancer and co-director of the Graham Company. The film was shortlisted for the 1999 Academy Award for Best Documentary Feature.

== Development ==
Wallowitch & Ross: This Moment was produced by Karmic Release Ltd. when costume designer Sue Gandy, a student of Wallowitch's introduced the duo to sister-in-law documentarian Roberta Morris Purdee and husband, actor Nathan Purdee. Filmed and edited in the first half of 1998 the film had its world premiere at the 1998 Palm Springs International Film Festival.

== Reception ==
The film received overwhelmingly positive reviews going on to be shortlisted for the 1999 Academy Awards. Variety called the film "An exceptionally tender portrait...A throwback to the era of Gershwin, Berlin and Porter." The New York Times wrote that it is as "as much a story of true love as it is a true showbiz story...Hilarious...Outrageous...Sublime!"

== Scandal ==
The 1998 Awards Season was marred by a number of problematic screenings wherein documentary films already disqualified from consideration were screened for Academy members in place of works still in contention.

== Music ==
The film's soundtrack was released by Karmic Release Ltd along with the film and features performances by Wallowitch, Ross, Dixie Carter, Lynn Lobban, and Sue Gandy.

== Legacy ==
The film has been preserved in both the UCLA and Academy of Motion Pictures Arts and Sciences archives for its contribution to documentary cinema and LGBT representation.
