= Amy Greenfield =

Amy Greenfield (born July 8, 1950 in Boston, Massachusetts, USA) is a filmmaker and writer living in New York City. She is an originator of the cine-dance genre and a pioneer of experimental film and video.

At their retrospective of her films, the Museum of Modern Art wrote, “Amy Greenfield developed a new form of video-dance, choreographing for the video camera and television screen.” The Whitney museum writes, “Amy Greenfield shows us how camera and human movement can be ecstatically joined together.” And film critic David Sterritt says in Cineaste Magazine, that she is “...today’s most important practitioner of experimental film-dance.”

== Work ==
Greenfield has directed, produced, edited, and often performed in more than thirty films, plus holographic moving sculpture, live multimedia, and video installations. Her award-winning work has been screened at the Museum of Modern Art; The Whitney Museum of American Art; American Museum of the Moving Image; Anthology Film Archives; Lincoln Center; National Film Theatre of London; the Hayward Gallery, London; the Munich Film Archive; Harvard Film Archives; the Kennedy Center and at international film festivals from Argentina to Japan, including the Berlin, London, Edinburgh, New York, Denver, Dance on Camera, Bologna, São Paulo, winning top prizes at the Houston, Atlanta, Williamsburg, Athens Greece Film Festivals. In 2007 she was honored by the National Gallery of Art, Washington DC in Cine-Dance in America, from Thomas Edison’s 1894 Annabelle to Greenfield’s 2002 Wildfire.

Her experimental feature film, Antigone/Rites Of Passion premiered at the Berlin Film Festival, and has screened internationally, including the 2004 Athens pre-Olympics celebrations; was a prize winner at the American Film Festival. The film is now distributed by Alive Mind Media, and is taught in colleges, universities and high schools across the US. Kevin Thomas writes of it in the Los Angeles Times, “Dazzling! Bold! Triumphantly ambitious and successful! An ‘Antigone’ as if we had never seen it performed in any other form before.”

Her live multimedia garnered a New York Times 10 Best in Arts and Entertainment: “Magical! Unforgettable!” (Dunning).

Her moving holographic sculptures are in the collection of the Museum of Holography. Her video and holography installations have been exhibited at the Hayward Gallery, London; PS 122 Art Space, Queens, NY; The Kitchen Center for Video, Music and Dance, The Franklin Institute, Philadelphia, The National Science Museum of Canada, and more.

Last season her major new live multimedia work, Spirit in The Flesh was presented at Symphony Space in New York (“Cosmic female energy.” AM New York). And she was featured film-maker in the first Biennial of Women in The Arts. This season her work is being shown from Williamsburg, Brooklyn to Barcelona, Spain, from the Institute of Contemporary Art in Philadelphia to the Scope Madrid Art Fair. She is now developing Spirit In The Flesh into a film. Her fine art video is represented by Creative Thrift Shop (www.creativethriftshop.com). Her film and videos are distributed by Canyon Cinema in the US and Collectif Jeune Cinema in Europe.

She is also a poet and writer. Her poetry book, We Too Are Alive, was carried by Barnes & Noble stores after 9/11. Her poems have been published in inter-national literary journals. She edited FilmDance, with her seminal article, “Filmdance: Space;Time;Energy,” and has written feature articles on film for Film Comment and more.

Amy Greenfield is a graduate of Harvard University.

== Responses ==
Amy Greenfield has been honored for her contributions to the arts by the Fulbright Foundation and Harvard University and has received grants and fellowships from the National Endowment for the Arts, The Rockefeller Foundation, The New York Foundation for the Arts, The Jerome Foundation, The Council On The Arts And Humanities of Staten Island, and David Rockefeller, Jr.

In February 2010, YouTube removed the videos "Element" and "Tides" from its service saying the representation of nudity offended the site's "community standards." The National Coalition Against Censorship and the Electronic Frontier Foundation both intervened in support of Greenfield and the videos were promptly reinstated.

== Filmography ==
| Year | Title | Role |
|---|---|---|
| 1970 | Transport | Director |
| 1973 | Element | Director |
| 1982 | Tides | Director |
| 1990 | Antigone/Rites of Passion | Director |
| 2000 | Wildfire | Director |
