= Lost Girls & Love Hotels =

2020 film by William Olsson

- Release poster
- Directed by: William Olsson
- Screenplay by: Catherine Hanrahan
- Based on: Lost Girls and Love Hotels by Catherine Hanrahan
- Produced by: Lauren Mann; Lawrence Inglee
- Starring: Alexandra Daddario; Takehiro Hira; Misuzu Kanno; Andrew Rothney; Yasunari Takeshima; Kate Easton; Haruka Imo; Carice van Houten
- Cinematography: Kenji Katori
- Edited by: Sarah Flack
- Music by: Ola Fløttum
- Production companies: Blackbird; Wandering Trail Pictures
- Distributed by: Astrakan Film AB
- Release date: September 18, 2020
- Running time: 97 minutes
- Country: United States
- Languages: English; Japanese
- Box office: $83,257

Lost Girls & Love Hotels (stylized as Lost Girls & Love Hotels - Rosuto gāruzu & rabuhoteruzu) is a 2020 American erotic drama film directed by William Olsson from a screenplay by Catherine Hanrahan which adapts her 2006 novel. The film stars Alexandra Daddario as an American English teacher in Tokyo, who loses herself to the city's nightlife and begins an affair with a member of the Yakuza. It was released in the United States on video on demand on September 18, 2020, by Astrakan Film AB.

== Plot ==
Margaret is an American expatriate living in Tokyo. During the day, she works at a Japanese academy teaching prospective flight attendants how to interact with English flight safety instructions. She spends her nights getting drunk with fellow expatriates Ines and Liam and seeks out submissive sexual encounters with random men in the city's numerous love hotels. Her misadventures cause her to sometimes show up to work in a daze and disheveled, drawing the concern of her manager, Nakamura. However, Nakamura sees something of her younger self in Margaret and is sympathetic.

One day, Margaret crosses paths with a Yakuza enforcer named Kazu, and the two begin a relationship. Margaret is at first taken aback by Kazu's revelation that he is about to get married, but she continues with him after he admits that his marriage is more out of duty than love. Margaret confides to Kazu that she does not have a family: her father left when she was a child, her mother died from cancer, and she has a schizophrenic brother. She came to Japan to be alone. She asks if he has ever cut off someone’s finger. He explains a finger amputation is an “apology,” a reminder of a transgression.

On the day of graduation for Margaret's students at the flight academy, Kazu asks Margaret to spend the entire day with him in Kyoto. Initially reluctant to skip graduation, Margaret agrees when he says he will not get another day, and they take the train. He brings her to the Kiyomizu-dera temple and shows her the "Buddha's womb", a stone illuminated at the end of a pitch-black tunnel. Kazu explains the symbolism of being reborn by reaching the stone and says that he has brought Margaret there hoping to help her let go of her trauma, but Margaret seems unaffected. On the train ride back to Tokyo, Kazu leaves the train while Margaret is asleep, leaving her despondent and desperate to find him when she wakes up. When she returns to work the next day, she finds that she has been dismissed and replaced.

Margaret spirals down further when Ines reveals to her that she is leaving Japan. Following numerous meaningless sexual encounters, Margaret spots Kazu with his family by chance one day and follows him into a love hotel. Kazu reprimands Margaret for following him, telling her nothing can happen between them. When Margaret insists that she loves him, they have sex one more time before he sends her away, leaving him saddened and conflicted. When Margaret returns to her apartment she finds an eviction notice. She desperately takes a job as a bar hostess for drunken businessmen, but finds herself unable to participate and leaves without getting paid.

Now homeless and at rock bottom, Margaret is found on the street by Liam's girlfriend Louise, who reveals that Liam has been deported. After sharing a drink with Louise, Margaret gets drunk and begins wandering around Tokyo aimlessly at night until she notices a strange man following her. She asks him to take her to a love hotel. She tells him that she likes to be submissive. On his orders she strips naked and lies down, the stranger then tying her hands and feet to the bed. When he suggests that he could kill her, she begs him to do it, but Kazu comes into the room to rescue her, having followed her. He appears with his hand bandaged and bloody. Grateful for being rescued, Margaret decides to start anew by leaving Tokyo. On the plane, Margaret notices Tamiko, one of her former students, as one of the flight attendants and they smile at each other while Tamiko demonstrates safety procedures before the plane takes off. Margaret calls Kazu to tell him she now understands the symbolism of the "Buddha's womb" and finally feels reborn, saying goodbye to him for good. During the phone call, we see that his little finger was partially amputated, showing his penitence.

== Cast ==
- Alexandra Daddario as Margaret
- Takehiro Hira as Kazu
- Carice van Houten as Ines
- Andrew Rothney as Liam
- Misuzu Kanno as Nakamura
- Yasunari Takeshima as Used
- Kate Easton as Louise
- Haruka Imo as Tamiko

== Production ==
In December 2009, it was announced that Kate Bosworth would produce and star in Lost Girls and Love Hotels, based on the 2006 novel by Catherine Hanrahan. Jean-Marc Vallee was tapped to direct and Nadia Conners wrote the adapted screenplay. However, the film never made it to production.

In October 2017, it was announced that Alexandra Daddario would star in a newly produced adaptation under the title I Am Not a Bird. The film later reverted to the original title. Hanrahan was hired to adapt her own novel and William Olsson was hired to direct. The rest of the cast, including Carice van Houten and Takehiro Hira, was announced in November 2017.

Principal photography took place from October to December 2017 in Tokyo and Kyoto, Japan.

== Release ==
It was announced in July 2020 that Lost Girls & Love Hotels would be released in select theaters and on video on demand in the United States on September 4, 2020, under Astrakan Releasing, the newly created distribution arm of Astrakan Films AB, the production company run by director William Olsson and producer Lauren Mann. In August 2020, the film was delayed to September 18. In October 2020, the film was picked up for international rights in 2021 by Signature Entertainment.

== Reception ==
On the review aggregator website Rotten Tomatoes, the film holds an approval rating of 50% based on reviews from 24 critics, with an average rating of 5.5/10. The website's critics consensus reads, "While it's a well-acted and occasionally involving mood piece, Lost Girls & Love Hotels often dampens its erotic elements with listless ennui." Metacritic reports a score of 57 out of 100 based on seven critic reviews, indicating "mixed or average" reviews.
