= Rent-A-Pal =

2020 film directed by Jon Stevenson

- Theatrical release poster
- Directed by: Jon Stevenson
- Written by: Jon Stevenson
- Produced by: Jon Stevenson; Jimmy Weber; Annie Elizabeth Baker; Robert B. Martin Jr.; Brandon Fryman; Brian Landis Folkins
- Starring: Wil Wheaton; Brian Landis Folkins; Kathleen Brady; Amy Rutledge; Adrian Egolf
- Cinematography: Scott Park
- Edited by: Jon Stevenson
- Music by: Jimmy Weber
- Production company: Pretty People Pictures
- Distributed by: IFC Midnight
- Release date: September 11, 2020
- Running time: 108 minutes
- Country: United States
- Language: English
- Box office: $31,053

Rent-A-Pal is a 2020 American thriller film written and directed by Jon Stevenson and stars Wil Wheaton, Brian Landis Folkins, Kathleen Brady, Amy Rutledge, and Adrian Egolf. The film follows a bachelor who buys a strange VHS tape featuring a charismatic man whom he interacts.

Rent-A-Pal was released on September 11, 2020, by IFC Midnight, and received positive reviews from critics.

== Plot ==
In 1990, middle-aged bachelor David Brower uses Video Rendezvous, a video dating service, while also caring for his irritable dementia-stricken mother, Lucille. His father, Frank, a jazz musician, committed suicide ten years prior. After recording a new tape at Video Rendezvous, David stumbles across a tape entitled Rent-A-Pal in the bargain bin and purchases it. The tape features host Andy who talks to the viewer and leaves pauses for the viewer to respond, simulating a conversation. David is quickly disillusioned and shuts it off.

Video Rendezvous tells David a woman named Lisa wants to match with him after watching his latest tape. When he goes to retrieve her tape, the receptionist informs him Lisa has found another match. David watches her tape and learns that she likes jazz and is a professional caregiver, which depresses him further. He continues watching Rent-A-Pal and confides in Andy that Lucille was physically abusive. David talks about his failures to find a partner, and when Andy shares a story about a girl, David becomes his friend.

David continuously watches the tape, talking, drinking, and playing cards with Andy. Andy presses David for an embarrassing story, and they swap stories about experiences with girls. David begins masturbating to Andy's story, even as Andy inexplicably tells it with David's name instead of his. Lucille catches David masturbating, but mistakes him for Frank. As she gets belligerent, David angrily tells her that her husband is dead. After she breaks down, he recants and says that Frank is alive and well.

Video Rendezvous informs David that Lisa's previous match didn't work out and that she's once again interested in him. The two go on a date and connect over their experience in caregiving. The date goes successfully, and Lisa sets up another one for the following evening. David tells Andy, but Andy accuses David of casting him aside and forgetting about their plan to play cards. David cancels his date, using his mom as an excuse.

David spends the evening interacting with Andy, but discovers that Lucille has wandered out of the house. Frantic, David calls Lisa for help. Together they find her and bring her home. David shows Lisa his room and shares his father's music with her. As they get intimate on the couch, David accidentally turns on Rent-A-Pal. Andy seems to watch David judgingly. David prematurely ejaculates when Lisa touches him, at which Andy laughs hysterically. When Lisa questions David about the tape, he gets angry and defensive, prompting her to leave.

The next morning, as David cleans the house, he finds in his mother's room a picture of him and Andy, seemingly taken during the course of the tape. He finds Lucille cutting up his tape in the kitchen, mistaking it for Scotch tape. Furious, David strikes her in the face with the tape before going out and buying another copy. After rewatching it, he picks up Lucille from the kitchen floor and takes her to the basement stairs. When she addresses him as David, he coldly tells her she's the reason that Frank killed himself, then pushes her down the stairs. All the TVs in the house begin to play Rent-A-Pal.

Lisa arrives, wanting to make amends for the previous night, and discovers Lucille's body. David confronts her while speaking like Andy and tries to keep her from calling the police. He then tries to murder her. She manages to stab him in the chest with a pair of scissors before fleeing. David drags himself into the basement and fast-forwards the tape to the end, in which Andy forlornly says goodbye to the viewer, before he bleeds out.

== Cast ==
- Wil Wheaton as Andy
- Brian Landis Folkins as David Brower
- Amy Rutledge as Lisa
- Kathleen Brady as Lucille Brower
- Adrian Egolf as Diane
- Josh Staan as Camera man
- Luke Sorge as Customer
- Olivia Hendrick as Susan
- Andrew Vincent as Rollerskater
- Karin Carr as Carla
- Sara Woodyard as Mary
- Brandon Fryman as Skate City employee

== Production ==
The movie's premise was inspired by Rent-A-Friend, a 1986 VHS tape by Ben Hollis with the same premise and presentation as the movie's in-universe Rent-A-Pal. Various prompts from Rent-A-Friend, such as the participants sharing their most embarrassing stories, are also present in Rent-A-Pal.

== Release ==
The film was released on September 11, 2020.

== Reception ==
On Rotten Tomatoes the film has an approval rating of 67% based on reviews from 52 critics, with an average score of 6.6/10. The website's critics consensus reads: "Rent-A-Pal suffers from untapped thematic potential, but Wil Wheaton's unsettling performance makes this unique horror story worth watching." On Metacritic, the film has a weighted average score of 61 out of 100, based on 7 critics, indicating "Generally Favorable reviews".

Frank Scheck of The Hollywood Reporter wrote: "What makes the film work as well as it does, at least up to a point, are the perfectly calibrated performances."

== Accolades ==
Award ceremony	Category	Recipient	Result	Ref.
Grimmfest	Best Actor	Brian Landis Folkins	Won	
Grimmfest	Best Screenplay	Jon Stevenson	Won	
Sunset Film Circle Awards	Scene Stealer	Wil Wheaton	Nominated	
Sunset Film Circle Awards	Directors to Watch	Jon Stevenson	Nominated	
Sitges Film Festival	Best Motion Picture	Rent-A-Pal	Nominated	
Strasbourg European Fantastic Film Festival	Best International Feature Film	Rent-A-Pal - Jon Stevenson	Nominated	
