= Musikfest =

Annual American music festival

Coordinates: 40.614815°N 75.371909°W

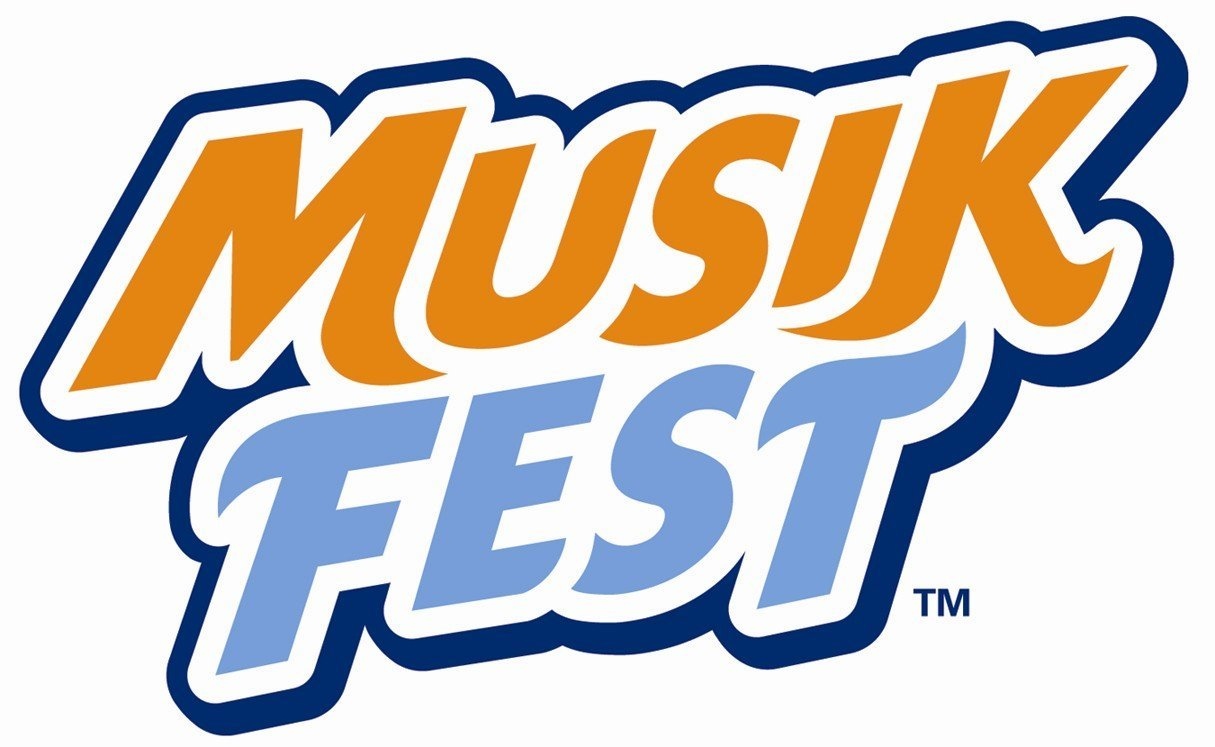
- The Musikfest logo since 2013
- Genre: Various
- Dates: Begins on the Friday before the first Saturday in August and ends on the Sunday ten days later
- Locations: Bethlehem, Pennsylvania, U.S.
- Years active: 1984–present
- Founders: Jeff Parks
- Website: www.artsquest.org/musikfest/

Musikfest is an American music festival that has been held annually since 1984 in Bethlehem in the Lehigh Valley region of eastern Pennsylvania. It is the nation's largest non-gated free music festival. The festival begins on the first Friday in August, though it has been preceded since 2015 with a Thursday preview night involving the premium stage and adjacent areas. The festival ends the second Sunday thereafter.

Musikfest is presented by ArtsQuest, a nonprofit arts organization founded to celebrate arts and culture in the Lehigh Valley and beyond. Proceeds from the event benefit ArtsQuest ventures such as the Creative Factory community arts center in South Bethlehem, and other nonprofit groups throughout the region. Musikfest served as the inspiration for major plot elements of the music film Killian & the Comeback Kids.
