= John Wallowitch =

American songwriter

- Born: February 11, 1926; Philadelphia, US
- Died: August 15, 2007 (aged 81); New York City, US
- Resting place: Kensico Cemetery
- Education: Temple University
- Known for: Songwriter and cabaret performer
- Partner: Bertram Ross

John Wallowitch (February 11, 1926 – August 15, 2007) was an American songwriter and cabaret performer. He wrote over 2,700 songs; his works include "Bruce", "Come a Little Closer", "I See the World Through Your Eyes", "Back on the Town" and "Mary's Bar". For over 50 years he played and sang a catalogue of original songs at nightspots around New York City, as well as on his cable television show John's Cabaret. He is also known for his sophisticated takes on the songs of Irving Berlin.

== Biography ==
Wallowitch was born in the Methodist Hospital in South Philadelphia. He attended Edgar Allan Poe Elementary School, Vare Junior High School, Central High School and Temple University in Philadelphia. Wallowitch spent his youth in a desolate neighborhood in South Philadelphia, dreaming about moving to New York. He finally arrived there in his late teens to study classical piano at Juilliard. In order to survive, he played rehearsal piano for shows, among them Leonard Sillman's New Faces of '52, and began to play at the Duplex, a Greenwich Village saloon.

== Career ==
His first professional appearance was on the Lithuanian Furniture Company Radio Hour (Station WHAT) on which he rendered Irving Berlin’s “So Help Me.”

Wrote Stephen Holden in The New York Times: “While Noël Coward is no longer around to set the standards for a certain kind of sophisticated songwriting sensibility, Mr. Wallowitch nimbly carries the torch.”

In a matter of weeks
With the modern techniques
For improving physiques
They have altered their beaks
And they've lifted their cheeks
And now everyone speaks
In society's cliques
Of the changes that science has wrought
Of the changes that money has bought!

He often wrote about growing up in Philadelphia, and of life with his family. “I See the World Through Your Eyes” is a remembrance of Wallowitch's late brother, photographer Edward Wallowitch, close associate of Andy Warhol. “Manhattan, You’re A Dream” pays tribute to Wallowitch’s mother.

During the 1960s he met three women who would become his greatest champions: singer-pianist Blossom Dearie for whom Wallowitch’s song “Bruce” was a favorite standard; actress and singer Dixie Carter who recorded a collection of Wallowitch songs in 1984; and Joanne Beretta. Wallowitch’s compositions have also been recorded by Shirley Horn, Tony Bennett, Berri Blair, John Dubois, Marlene VerPlanck, Lynn Lobban, and many others. Among the many fine performers who sing his songs are Lynn Lobban, Alice Levine, Eric Comstock, Yvonne Sherwell, Sue Gandy, Joanne Beretta and Michael Belliveau.

Throughout the 1980s and 1990s, Wallowitch was part of a popular cabaret act with his longtime partner, Bertram Ross. The pair sang in nightspots ranging from London’s Pizza on the Park to the Ballroom in New York City. A CD of their performance cabaret, “Wallowitch and Ross” (Miranda Music) was released in 2003 to supplement the documentary film of the couple, Wallowitch & Ross: This Moment.

As a solo cabaret entertainer, Wallowitch performed throughout the world and was famous for his long-running hit revue, The World of Wallowitch. He was the recipient of both the MAC and Bistro Awards for Composer of the Year.

Wallowitch performed and recorded the song “Hillary Oh Hillary,” for Hillary Clinton during her run for U.S. Senate. Henry and Bobbie Shaffner, veteran members of ASCAP, wrote the lyrics and set them to the tune of the old Groucho Marx song, “Lydia, the Tattooed Lady”. Wallowitch and the Shaffners were inspired to write it after Clinton’s six-hour-long visit to Wallowitch's New York studio, where he performed for the former first lady. Later, he translated the Shaffners’ lyrics to Yiddish, to create a version called “Hillary, Oy! Hillary!”

John Wallowitch lived and performed in New York City with his longtime partner Bertram Ross, until Ross's death on Apr 20, 2003.

Wallowitch died on August 15, 2007, in New York City. Wallowitch is buried beside Ross at Kensico Cemetery in Valhalla, New York.

In 2016, Wallowitch & Ross: This Moment was entered into the American Academy of Motion Picture Arts and Sciences film archive for permanent preservation.

During 1989, comedian Chris Elliott would parody Wallowitch on the Late Night with David Letterman show portraying the musical character Johnny Graham, who took requests via telephone. They were often prank phone calls.

== Discography ==
- 1964: This Is John Wallowitch!!!, LP features cover artwork by Andy Warhol (Serenus Records SEP 2005)
- 1965: This Is The Other Side Of John Wallowitch!!!, LP features cover artwork by Andy Warhol (Serenus Records SEP 2006)
- 197?: Now appearing at Dreamland Memory Ballroom, LP features cover artwork by Jean Veber (Serenus Records SEPS 22015)
- 1984: Back On The Town [LIVE] (DRG Label)
- 1993: My Manhattan, featuring Bertram Ross & Dixie Carter (DRG Label)
- 1999: Wallowitch & Ross: This Moment. (Music from the Motion Picture) (Karmic Records)
- 2002: Wallowitch & Ross, John Wallowitch & Bertram Ross.
- 2008: Miracle On 71st Street, (13 Stories Records) (iTunes)

=== Wallowitch performed by others ===
- 1983: Dixie Carter Sings John Wallowitch Live at the Carlyle (DRG Label)
- 2003: Frankie and Johnny and Me, Lynn Lobban performing John Wallowitch songs (LML Music)
- 2007: You're for Loving Sue Gandy and John Wallowitch (Karmic Records)
