= Louise Kaplan =

Psychologist

Dr Louise Kaplan
- Born: November 18, 1929; Brooklyn, New York, US
- Died: January 9, 2012 (aged 82); Manhattan, New York, US
- Education: Brooklyn College; New York University
- Spouse: Donald Kaplan
- Children: 2
- Scientific career
- Fields: Psychology
- Workplaces: Private practice of psychoanalysis, 1966-68; Children's Day Treatment Center, NYC, chief psychologist, 1966-70; New York University, director of mother-infant research nursery, 1973-77; Margaret S. Mahler Research Foundation, Professional Advisory Board, 1980-2012; College of City University of New York, associate professor of psychology and director of child clinical services, 1977-80.

Louise Janet Kaplan, o.s. Miller, (18 November 1929, New York City – 9 January 2012, New York) was an American psychologist and psychoanalyst best known for her research into childhood development. Kaplan authored seven books including the 1991 book, Female Perversions: The Temptations of Emma Bovary which was made into the 1996 film Female Perversions starring Tilda Swinton.

== Publications ==
- Oneness and Separateness: From Infant to Individual, 1978
- Adolescence: The Farewell to Childhood, 1984
- The Family Romance of the Impostor-Poet Thomas Chatterton, 1987
- Female Perversions: The Temptations of Emma Bovary, 1991
- No Voice Is Ever Wholly Lost, 1995
- Cultures of Fetishism, 2006

== Death ==
Kaplan died of pancreatic cancer on Monday, January 9, 2012, at Beth Israel Hospital.
