= Catherine Hanrahan =

Canadian writer

- Born: Toronto
- Occupation: Writer
- Writing career
- Language: English
- Genre: Fiction
- Notable works: Lost Girls and Love Hotels

Catherine Hanrahan is a Canadian writer, whose debut novel Lost Girls and Love Hotels (2006) was a shortlisted finalist for the Rogers Writers' Trust Fiction Prize in 2007. The novel was based on her own experience living and working in Tokyo as an English teacher. She works now at IES Enskede in Sweden as a teacher.

The novel was later optioned by Jean-Marc Vallée for adaptation as a feature film, which would have starred Kate Bosworth. The film was not made at that time, and it was not until 2017 that a new production was announced. William Olsson took over as director of Lost Girls & Love Hotels and Hanrahan adapted her own novel into the screenplay.
