= Killian & the Comeback Kids =

American music film written and directed by Taylor A. Purdee

- Directed by: Taylor A. Purdee
- Written by: Taylor A. Purdee
- Produced by: Roberta Morris Purdee; Taylor A. Purdee
- Starring: Taylor A. Purdee; John Donchak; Nathan Purdee; Kassie DePaiva; Shannon O'Boyle; Shane Andries
- Cinematography: Ian Mosley-Duffy
- Music by: The Cumberland Kids
- Production company: Karmic Release Ltd.
- Distributed by: Hope Runs High
- Release date: September 18, 2020
- Running time: 137 minutes
- Country: United States
- Language: English

Killian & the Comeback Kids is a 2020 American folk-rock musical film written and directed by Taylor A. Purdee. The film stars Purdee, John Donchak, Nathan Purdee, and Kassie DePaiva along with an ensemble cast that features Maddi Jane and Lee Grant. Killian & the Comeback Kids follows a mixed-race musician who finds himself back in his struggling rural hometown after graduating from an expensive university. The film's screenplay and original music have been preserved by The Academy of Motion Pictures Arts and Sciences' permanent archive.

== Plot ==
Killian returns home after his college graduation before heading off on a modest musical tour with his bandmate Ben. When Ben abandons their plan in favor of a stable A&R job Killian finds himself stuck in the once prosperous Pennsylvania steel-town. When it's announced that the major music festival that comes to town every summer is finally open to local acts, Killian gathers a group of former childhood friends and acquaintances, all of whom have returned home after college degrees, in an attempt to win the gig. Elements of the film are based on the real life withdrawal of Bethlehem Steel and creation of Musikfest in Bethlehem, Pennsylvania.

== Production ==
In August 2017 it was announced that filming had begun in Easton, Pennsylvania. The cast is made up largely of actor-musicians including members of the hit broadway and off-broadway shows Once (musical), Blue Man Group, Kinky Boots, and Spring Awakening. The film was shot entirely on location in the Lehigh Valley region of Pennsylvania. Both the film's original soundtrack and score were written by The Cumberland Kids, a folk-rock act fronted Purdee and Liam Higgins.

In 2018 it was announced via the film's social media that Maddi Jane and Lee Grant would also appear in the film.

== Release ==
During the COVID-19 pandemic it was announced that Hope Runs High had acquired distribution rights for the film.

The film was released on September 18, 2020, making Killian & the Comeback Kids one of the first new films to play in American theaters during the pandemic, and one of the only independent films released exclusively to theaters. Due to its "platform release" structure, during its first few weeks it was sometimes the only fully theatrical film opening in a given city, marking the first time in history that this happened.

With Killian & the Comeback Kids, Purdee became the youngest director of the year with a film in major US cinema circuits, a trend that repeated itself the next year upon the film's 2021 continued release. The initial release also made him the first mixed-race director/star of African American heritage to have a narrative film released to US theatres in the 21st century.

According to an early 2021 interview with the director, the film was slated to open again exclusively in cinemas that remained closed for the entirety of the 2020 leg of the coronavirus outbreak, in September 2021 before ever becoming available digitally.

The film did return to theatres in September 2021 after the reopening of major moviegoing markets and played another fully theatrical national run. The film was not released online until August 2022 making for one of the most unique theatrical release patterns of the COVID era.

== Reception ==
The film has received a largely enthusiastic reaction from critics, being compared favorably to the films of Alan Parker, Greta Gerwig, and John Carney's Academy Award winning "modern musical" Once. Film Threat praised Purdee's complex portrait of the title character. NPR WDIY also praised Purdee's performance both onscreen and musically, as well as the film's script, direction, cinematography, and "uplifting, insightful, lovely" soundtrack, saying "There's more to praise. Lots more...Killlian & the Comeback Kids lingers long after you've left the movie theatre."

In February 2021,Variety dubbed the film a potential dark horse candidate for the Academy Award for Best Original Song. Due to the COVID-19 crisis the film would only be eligible for most other major awards in 2022.

Harry Sherer hailed the film's inversion of traditional "band movie" tropes, calling it "a fresh and unique look at the contemporary identity crisis among young adults...[moving for any] human with the capacity to feel." The Chicago Sun-Times called it a "cool film with beautiful music and cinematography" while Icon Magazine noted the film's “magnificent locations…great music…[it's] a folk-rock journey.” Other standouts noted are the music by Purdee and Liam Higgins, Ian Mosely-Duffy's "inventive" cinematography, and the performances of Shannon O’Boyle, who Paul Willistein felt "registers in a break-out role as Rose," John Donchack, Shane Andries, Maddi Jane, Nathan Purdee, and Kassie DePaiva.

In 2022 the film's screenplay and original music were honored with inclusion in The Academy of Motion Picture Arts and Sciences' permanent core collection for historic preservation.
