= Taylor A. Purdee =

American screenwriter

- Born: Taylor Armstrong Purdee; New York City, New York, U.S.
- Education: Fordham University
- Occupations: Film director, actor, screenwriter, musician
- Years active: 2007–present
- Parents: Nathan Purdee; Roberta Morris Purdee

Taylor Armstrong Purdee is an American director, actor, screenwriter, and songwriter. He is best known for creating the musical film Killian & the Comeback Kids, as well as for his work preserving the documentary films of Academy Award winning actor/director Lee Grant. Purdee is the first biracial actor-director of African American descent to have a fiction film theatrically released in the United States in the 21st century.

== Early life and education ==
Purdee is the son of actor Nathan Purdee and documentarian Roberta Morris Purdee and was born in New York City. He was raised primarily in the Lehigh Valley region of Pennsylvania, where he worked with the family's production company Karmic Release in his teens. Purdee graduated from the Lehigh Valley Charter High School for the Arts in Bethlehem, Pennsylvania before attending Fordham University in New York City.

== Career ==
=== Film ===
While still studying at Fordham, Purdee began work on This is Honduras, a documentary exploration of life in and around San Pedro Sula, Honduras, the murder capital of the world. Filming in Honduras between academic terms, Purdee edited the film over the next few years. A private screening was held for the film at the Paramount Pictures screening room in New York City before the film premiered as the highest grossing selection of its Chagrin Documentary Film Festival.

While at Fordham, Purdee participated in New York's downtown theatre scene appearing in Pee Pee Poo Poo Papa Face, an experimental piece with text by Young Jean Lee, assistant directing the New York premiere of Maria Irene Fornes' play What of the Night. and overseeing some technical aspects of the beloved Off-Broadway Argentinian spectacles Fuerza Bruta and Wayra: Fuerza Bruta.

In 2015, it was announced on YouTube that Purdee was organizing the preservation and potential re-release of several documentaries directed by Lee Grant. Ahead of Grant's appearance at the 2017 Turner Classic Movies film festival, The Hollywood Reporter and Los Angeles Times reported that Grant and Purdee had co-directed a short YouTube video highlighting the public mistreatment of Hillary Clinton at the hands of her male opponents during the 2016 presidential campaign. Later that year it was announced that Karmic Release Ltd. had begun production on Killian & the Comeback Kids, a musical film written and directed by Purdee, starring Taylor and Nathan Purdee, Kassie DePaiva, John Donchak, Shane Andries, and Shannon O'Boyle. Shot entirely on location in the Lehigh Valley region of Pennsylvania the film features an original soundtrack created by Purdee's folk-rock group The Cumberland Kids.

During Killian & the Comeback Kids' post-production period Purdee appeared on the superhero TV shows Gotham and Iron Fist, as well as the surprise Finnish hit Nortti: DragonSlayer666. He has voiced radio ad campaigns for AT&T, Bank of America, Ragú, and Spam.

He has created documentary content on film history for NBC Universal, focusing on subjects like Peter Biskind, Kirk Douglas, Warren Beatty, and Lee Grant. Most recently he and Karmic Release Ltd. co-produced a documentary short for Kino Lorber's blu-ray re-release of Hal Ashby's Academy Award nominated debut film The Landlord.

Killian & the Comeback Kids was released in September 2020 as one of the first films back in theatres after their initial COVID-19 closures, as well as one of the only independent productions with a fully theatrical release at this time. The film made Purdee the youngest director with a film in the major American theatre chains in both 2020 and 2021, as the film received a subsequent release as cities continued to reopen the next year. The release also marked him as the first biracial director/star of African American descent to have a narrative film released in US theatres in the 21st century. Purdee's original screenplay and songs for the film were preserved by The Academy of Motion Pictures Arts and Sciences' permanent archive in 2022.

Purdee served as the curator for a collection of documentary films directed by Lee Grant which was re-released theatrically for the first time in late 2019, beginning as part of a retrospective on Grant's work at New York's Film Forum. The extended life of the documentary collection in theaters was cut short by theater closures due to COVID-19 lockdowns. Purdee was asked to reimagine the series as one of the earliest examples of a virtual cinema release. Adding a series of program notes and new or unreleased interviews with Grant, as well as excerpts from the Kirk Douglas archive, the series was renamed 20th Century Woman: The Documentary Films of Lee Grant. It became the "first virtual repertory series" and received critical praise for bringing Grant's films back into the public eye and highlighting the plight of independent movie theaters during the crisis.

In August 2020, Playbill reported that Hope Runs High would release Purdee's musical film Killian & the Comeback Kids as one of the first new films and only independents to return exclusively to American theaters during the crisis.

=== Music ===
Purdee began playing folk music and busking in the parks and subways of New York City. This quickly coalesced into a duo with scientist and songwriter Liam Higgins, a childhood friend. The group's first major work is the original soundtrack and score for Killian & the Comeback Kids, though it has been reported that they are in the midst of recording a long form concept album. The band cites artists as disparate as singer-songwriter Josh Ritter, Bob Dylan, King Gizzard and the Lizard Wizard, and "Weird Al" Yankovic as inspiration.
