= Hope Runs High =

- Company type: Private
- Industry: Entertainment
- Services: film distribution
- Website: Official website

Hope Runs High is an American film distribution company. They began preserving digitally and distributing out-of-print documentary films before expanding to narrative and first-run theatrical films. A unique element of their library is that much of it focuses on films by women, people of color, and LGBTQ+ filmmakers and subjects. The company also houses a small record label that releases movie soundtracks and film scores.

== Background ==
Hope Runs High acquired the distribution rights for a library of acclaimed documentary films. This collection included films from Academy Award-winning actress/director Lee Grant, including her 1986 Best Documentary Feature winner Down and Out in America, and filmmaker Richard Morris' Oscar-shortlisted musical documentary Wallowitch & Ross: This Moment.

Many of these films, such as What Sex Am I?, feature LGBTQ+ characters and were not seen in mainstream cinema at the time of their original release, thus rescuing and showcasing a unique corner of queer cinema.

In 2019, Hope Runs High began to refocus on theatrical distribution, beginning with a limited theatrical re-release of documentaries by Grant. Grant's films launched as part of a retrospective at New York's Film Forum and marked the first retrospective of her work to look at her time as both actor and director, and the first time many of the films had been exhibited in decades.

Having begun with film preservation, some of the company's work deals with film history. Many of their digital releases include supplementary content designed to provide further cultural and historical context for the viewer.

== COVID-19/Virtual Cinema ==
An expansion of Grant's documentaries to art house and repertory cinemas was cut short by the COVID-19 pandemic. In response, the re-release of Grant's films was redesigned as one of the earliest examples of a virtual cinema release. The collection of Grant's documentaries was curated for virtual cinemas by Taylor A. Purdee and has become the first virtual retrospective in the United States, and the largest series on Grant's directorial work.

Subsequently, it was announced that the American Film Institute would honor Grant's lifetime achievements specifically as a documentarian during its 2020 AFI Docs film festival with a digital showing of Grant's Down and Out in America accompanying the celebration. Due to the pandemic, the festival has been held virtually for the first time.

Also during the COVID-19 crisis, Hope Runs High brought Jonathan Caouette's 2003 documentary Tarnation to digital streaming for the first time in collaboration with The Criterion Collection. The film premiered June 1, 2020 in celebration of (a much changed) Pride Month.
