= Nathan Purdee =

American actor (born 1950)

Nathan Purdee (born August 6, 1950 in Tampa, Florida) is an American actor, best known for his roles in popular soap operas.

== Career ==
Purdee rose to prominence as mobster-turned-private investigator Nathan Hastings on the CBS soap opera The Young and the Restless, a role he portrayed from 1984 to 1992. His involvement on Y&R (he was one of only two black cast members on the show in the late 1980s) paved the way for more African American additions to the cast. In this period, while appearing on Santa Barbara, Purdee performed the first interracial kiss on American daytime television. He left Y&R in December 1991 and moved to New York in January 1992 to play the role of District Attorney Hank Gannon on the ABC soap opera One Life to Live, a role he would portray until 2003. Between Y&R and OLTL, he portrayed Youngblood "Superfly" Priest in The Return of Superfly, the third and final installment in the classic Super Fly trilogy. On February 11, 2009, it was announced he would be returning to One Life to Live in April 2009.

In 2017, it was announced that Purdee would return to the screen in Killian & the Comeback Kids with One Life to Live co-star Kassie DePaiva. The film would be written and directed by Purdee's son Taylor A. Purdee.
