= America Undercover =

- Genre: Documentary
- Written by: Mark C. Baldwin
- Directed by: Oscar Nunez: Jon Alpert; Fenton Bailey
- Presented by: Oliver Stone
- Country of origin: United States
- Original language: English

Production
- Executive producer: Sheila Nevins
- Producer: Brent Owens
- Production company: America Undercover

Original release
- Network: HBO
- Release: 1983 – 2006

America Undercover is a series of documentaries that aired on the cable television network HBO from 1983 through 2006. Within the series are several sub-series, such as Autopsy, Real Sex, Shock Video, and Taxicab Confessions.

== History ==
The series began in 1983 and, after a brief time being broadcast weekly in 2001, was later broadcast once per month. In 2006, episodes began being rebroadcast on A&E Network.

Over the years, episodes have covered numerous subjects such as abortion, organized crime, and pedophilia.

== Episodes ==
No.	Title	Directed by	Written by	Original release date
TBA	"Five American Guns"	John Cosgrove	Raymond Bridgers, John Cosgrove, Terry Dunn Meurer	March 15, 1983
TBA	"Hooker"	Robert Niemack	Unknown	May 12, 1983
TBA	"Vanished: Missing Children"	Terry Dunn Meurer	Unknown	June 11, 1983
TBA	"When Women Kill"	Lee Grant	Janet Roach	September 7, 1983
TBA	"Growing Up Stoned"	Robert Niemack	Ann Hassett, Robert Niemack	January 10, 1984
TBA	"Murder: No Apparent Motive"	Imre Horvath	Unknown	April 24, 1984
TBA	"Being Homosexual"	Malcolm Clarke	Japhet Asher	May 9, 1984
TBA	"Life or Death in the Emergency Room"	Unknown	Unknown	June 20, 1984
TBA	"Getting Even: Victims Fight Back"	Hector Galan	Unknown	July 18, 1984
TBA	"Missing Persons: Four True Stories"	Kees Van Oostrum	Terry Dunn Meurer	August 19, 1984
TBA	"The Nightmare of Cocaine"	Fleming B. Fuller	Unknown	September 9, 1984
TBA	"Toxic Time Bomb: The Fight Against Deadly Pollution"	August Cinquegrana	Unknown	October 21, 1984
TBA	"Soldiers in Hiding"	Malcolm Clarke	Japhet Asher, Malcolm Clarke	November 11, 1984
TBA	"Disposable Heroes: The Other Side of Football"	Bill Couturié, Jon Else	Bill Couturié, Jon Else, Bob Moore	January 13, 1985
TBA	"Sexual Abuse of Children: Beyond the Secret"	Steve Mertz	Unknown	February 6, 1985
TBA	"What Sex Am I?"	Lee Grant	Unknown	April 18, 1985
TBA	"Acts of Violence"	Imre Horvath	Unknown	May 15, 1985
TBA	"Losin' It: Sex and the American Teenager"	Terry Dunn Meurer, Robert Richardson	Unknown	June 10, 1985
TBA	"UFOs: What's Going On?"	Robert Guenette	Unknown	September 10, 1985
TBA	"The Search for Mengele"	Brian Moser	James Bellini, William Bemister	October 14, 1985
TBA	"Down and Out in America"	Lee Grant	Unknown	December 4, 1985
TBA	"The Gift of Life"	Bill Couturié	Bill Couturié, Stephen Stept	January 12, 1986
TBA	"Kids in Crisis"	Robert Niemack	Ann Hassett, Robert Niemack	March 10, 1986
TBA	"Cops: Behind the Badge"	Imre Horvath	Unknown	April 7, 1986
TBA	"Rapists: Can They Be Stopped?"	John Zaritsky	John Zaritsky	June 9, 1986
TBA	"...and the Pursuit of Happiness"	Louis Malle	Unknown	July 4, 1986
TBA	"Kids in Sports: The Price of Glory"	Dennis Lofgren	Robert Guenette, Dennis Lofgren	September 10, 1986
TBA	"Verdict: The Wrong Man"	Julian Krainin	Julian Krainin	October 8, 1986
TBA	"Surveillance: No Place to Hide"	Joseph Angier	Unknown	November 4, 1986
TBA	"Drunk & Deadly: A Day on America's Highways"	Robert Niemack	Ann Hassett, Robert Niemack	May 17, 1987
TBA	"The Life of Junkie Junior"	Jon Alpert	Unknown	July 15, 1987
TBA	"Vigilante: Right or Wrong"	Malcolm Clarke	Malcolm Clarke	August 2, 1987
TBA	"Warning: Food May Be Hazardous to Your Health"	Aram Boyajian	Unknown	September 7, 1987
TBA	"Murder or Mercy: Five American Families"	Terry Dunn Meurer	Raymond Bridgers	January 5, 1988
TBA	"Do the Guilty Go Free?"	Malcolm Clarke	Malcolm Clarke	February 9, 1988
TBA	"Suzi's Story"	Iain Gillespie, Terry Carlyon	Iain Gillespie	March 8, 1988
TBA	"Dear America: Letters Home from Vietnam"	Bill Couturié	Richard Dewhurst, Bill Couturié	April 3, 1988
TBA	"Execution: Fourteen Days in May"	Paul Hamann	Paul Hamann	May 23, 1988
TBA	"Confessions of an Undercover Cop"	Chris Jeans	Unknown	July 18, 1988
TBA	"Warning: Medicine May Be Hazardous to Your Health"	Veronica L. Young	Veronica L. Young	August 2, 1988
TBA	"Why Did Johnny Kill?"	Robert Niemack	Ann Hassett, Robert Niemack	September 7, 1988
TBA	"Transplant"	Vincent Stafford	Unknown	December 21, 1988
TBA	"One Year in A Life of Crime"	Jon Alpert	Unknown	March 7, 1989
TBA	"Into Madness"	Susan Raymond	Unknown	July 6, 1989
TBA	"Battered"	Lee Grant	Unknown	September 13, 1989
TBA	"Crack USA: County Under Siege"	Vince DiPersio, Bill Guttentag	Vince DiPersio, Bill Guttentag	November 10, 1989
TBA	"Child of Rage: A Story of Abuse"	Arthur Ginsberg	Unknown	July 2, 1990
TBA	"Convicts on the Street: One Year on Parole"	Robert Niemack	Mark C. Baldwin, Ann Hassett, Robert Niemack	July 6, 1990
TBA	"Guns: A Day in the Death of America"	Malcolm Clarke, Lorenz Knauer	Malcolm Clarke	July 16, 1990
TBA	"The Best Hotel on Skid Row"	Geof Bartz, Christine Choy, Renee Tajima-Peña	Renee Tajima-Peña	December 4, 1990
TBA	"Doing Time: Life Inside the Big House"	Alan Raymond	Unknown	February 12, 1991
TBA	"Heil Hitler! Confessions of a Hitler Youth"	Arthur Holch	Alfons Heck	June 2, 1991
TBA	"Rape: Cries from the Heartland"	Maryann DeLeo	Maryann DeLeo	July 2, 1991
TBA	"Attempted Murder: Confrontation"	Tom Spain	Unknown	September 11, 1991
TBA	"Losing It All: The Reality of Alzheimer's Disease"	Michael Mierendorf	Michael Mierendorf	October 1, 1991
TBA	"Death on the Job"	Vince DiPersio, Bill Guttentag	Vince DiPersio, Bill Guttentag	November 17, 1991
TBA	"Suicide Notes"	Robert Niemack	Mark C. Baldwin	January 14, 1992
TBA	"Educating Peter"	Gerardine Wurzburg	Unknown	January 21, 1992
TBA	"Asylum"	Joan Churchill	Joan Churchill	March 10, 1992
TBA	"The Iceman Tapes: Conversations with a Killer"	Arthur Ginsberg, Tom Spain	Richard Kuklinski	April 7, 1992
TBA	"Abortion: Desperate Choices"	Deborah Dickson, Susan Froemke, Albert Maysles	Unknown	May 5, 1992
TBA	"My Mother's Murder"	Charles C. Stuart	Charles C. Stuart, Sarah Payne Stuart	June 16, 1992
TBA	"Never Say Die: The Search for Eternal Youth"	Antony Thomas	Unknown	August 17, 1992
TBA	"Women on Trial"	Lee Grant	Unknown	October 27, 1992
TBA	"Aileen Wuornos: The Selling of a Serial Killer"	Nick Broomfield	Nick Broomfield	November 1, 1992
TBA	"Confronting Evil"	Unknown	Unknown	January 19, 1993
TBA	"Mob Stories"	Marc Levin	Alan Levin	March 9, 1993
TBA	"Skinheads USA: Soldiers of the Race War"	Shari Cookson	Unknown	May 4, 1993
TBA	"Multiple Personality Disorder: The Search for Deadly Memories"	Michael Mierendorf	Michael Mierendorf	July 1, 1993
TBA	"The Broadcast Tapes of Dr. Peter"	David Paperny	Peter Jepson-Young	July 1, 1993
TBA	"Why Am I Gay?: Stories of Coming Out in America"	Kenneth Paul Rosenberg	Unknown	August 10, 1993
TBA	"By Satan Possessed: The Search for the Devil"	Antony Thomas	Antony Thomas	September 7, 1993
TBA	"I Am a Promise: The Children of Stanton Elementary School"	Susan Raymond	Unknown	October 11, 1993
TBA	"Lock-Up: The Prisoners of Rikers Island"	Jon Alpert, Nina Rosenblum	Nina Rosenblum	June 6, 1994
TBA	"Southern Justice: The Murder of Medgar Evers"	Christopher Olgiati	Christopher Olgiati	July 11, 1994
TBA	"Gang War: Bangin' In Little Rock"	Marc Levin	Unknown	August 2, 1994
TBA	"Murder 9 to 5"	Gaby Monet	Unknown	December 11, 1994
TBA	"5 American Kids - 5 American Handguns"	Vince DiPersio, Bill Guttentag	Vince DiPersio; Bill Guttentag	March 1, 1995
TBA	"High on Crack Street: Lost Lives in Lowell"	Jon Alpert, Maryann DeLeo, Richard Farrell	Unknown	July 12, 1995
TBA	"Violence: An American Tradition"	Peter W. Kunhardt Jr., Philip B. Kunhardt III	Peter W. Kunhardt, Philip B. Kunhardt III	November 21, 1995
TBA	"Prison Life: Prisoners of the War on Drugs"	Marc Levin	Unknown	January 16, 1996
TBA	"The Celluloid Closet"	Rob Epstein, Jeffrey Friedman	Vito Russo, Rob Epstein, Jeffrey Friedman, Sharon Wood	January 30, 1996
TBA	"Letting Go: A Hospice Journey"	Deborah Dickson, Susan Froemke, Albert Maysles	Unknown	March 18, 1996
TBA	"To Love or Kill: Man vs. Animal"	Jonathan Partridge	Unknown	April 1, 1996
TBA	"Priestly Sins: Sex and the Church"	Nick Read	Unknown	May 1, 1996
TBA	"Paradise Lost: The Child Murders at Robin Hood Hills"	Joe Berlinger, Bruce Sinofsky	Unknown	June 10, 1996
TBA	"Return from Madness: The Struggle for Sanity"	Kenneth Paul Rosenberg	Unknown	July 6, 1996
TBA	"Mumia Abu-Jamal: A Case For Reasonable Doubt?"	John Edginton	John Edginton	July 23, 1996
TBA	"Memphis PD: War on the Streets"	Vince DiPersio, Bill Guttentag	Vince DiPersio, Bill Guttentag	August 13, 1996
TBA	"Hookers at the Point"	Brent Owens	Brent Owens	September 28, 1996
TBA	"Without Pity: A Film About Abilities"	Michael Mierendorf	Michael Mierendorf	October 8, 1996
TBA	"Fetishes"	Nick Broomfield	Nick Broomfield	October 19, 1996
TBA	"A Kill for a Kill"	Rod Williams	Unknown	January 6, 1997
TBA	"Talked to Death"	Eames Yates	Unknown	March 25, 1997
TBA	"Addicted"	Lisa F. Jackson	Linda Ellerbee	July 5, 1997
TBA	"Hookers at the Point: Going Out Again"	Brent Owens	Brent Owens	July 24, 1997
TBA	"27th & Prospect: One Year in the Fight Against Drugs"	Kirk Simon, Karen Goodman	Unknown	August 1, 1997
TBA	"The Execution Machine: Texas Death Row"	Marc Levin	Unknown	September 20, 1997
TBA	"Dragtime"	Patti Kaplan	Unknown	October 11, 1997
TBA	"Lenny Bruce: Swear to Tell the Truth"	Robert B. Weide	Robert B. Weide	October 21, 1997
TBA	"Calling Dr. Kevorkian: A Date with Dr. Death"	Unknown	Unknown	November 4, 1997
TBA	"Dead Blue: Surviving Depression"	Eames Yates	Unknown	January 6, 1998
TBA	"Pimps Up, Ho's Down"	Fredrik Gertten	Brent Owens	June 6, 1998
TBA	"Teen Killers: A Second Chance?"	Vince DiPersio	Unknown	September 8, 1998
TBA	"The Kindness of Strangers"	Tony Palmer, Maro Chermayeff	Unknown	September 18, 1998
TBA	"Death by Hanging: A Family's Pledge of Allegiance"	Kimi Zabihyan	Unknown	October 13, 1998
TBA	"Strippers: The Naked Stages"	Eamon Harrington, John Watkin	Unknown	October 31, 1998
TBA	"Life of Crime 2"	Jon Alpert	Unknown	December 15, 1998
TBA	"Out at Work"	Kelly Anderson, Tami Gold	Unknown	January 6, 1999
TBA	"Private Dicks: Men Exposed"	Thom Powers, Meema Spadola	Unknown	March 15, 1999
TBA	"Black Tar Heroin: The Dark End of the Street"	Steven Okazaki	Unknown	April 19, 1999
TBA	"Juror #5"	Fenton Bailey, Randy Barbato	Unknown	May 1, 1999
TBA	"Thug Life in D.C."	Marc Levin	Unknown	May 4, 1999
TBA	"Xtreme: Sports to Die For"	Rob Epstein, Jeffrey Friedman	Unknown	June 10, 1999
TBA	"The Living Museum"	Jessica Yu	Jessica Yu	July 6, 1999
TBA	"Fatal Twisters: A Season of Fury"	Vince DiPersio	Vince DiPersio	July 12, 1999
TBA	"The Vampire Murders"	Eames Yates	Eames Yates	August 19, 1999
TBA	"American Hollow"	Rory Kennedy	Mark Bailey	November 29, 1999
TBA	"A Century of Living"	Imre Horvath	Unknown	December 22, 1999
TBA	"Americanos: Latino Life in the United States"	Susan Todd, Andrew Young	Unknown	January 21, 2000
TBA	"Paragraph 175"	Rob Epstein, Jeffrey Friedman	Sharon Wood	January 22, 2000
TBA	"Children in War"	Alan Raymond, Susan Raymond	Alan Raymond, Susan Raymond	February 5, 2000
TBA	"Cancer: Evolution to Revolution"	Joseph F. Lovett	Kenneth Paul Rosenberg	March 1, 2000
TBA	"Paradise Lost 2: Revelations"	Joe Berlinger, Bruce Sinofsky	Unknown	March 12, 2000
TBA	"Hookers & Johns: Trick or Treat"	Brent Owens	Brent Owens	May 6, 2000
TBA	"Broken Child"	Michael Mierendorf	Michael Mierendorf	July 6, 2000
TBA	"George"	Henry Corra, Grahame Weinbren	Mark Waxman	July 10, 2000
TBA	"Drinking Apart: Families Under the Influence"	Kenneth Paul Rosenberg	Brian Brown, Geanne Rosenberg	August 1, 2000
TBA	"Life Afterlife"	Lisa F. Jackson	Unknown	August 7, 2000
TBA	"Hate.com: Extremists on the Internet"	Vince DiPersio, Bill Guttentag	Vince DiPersio, Bill Guttentag	October 23, 2000
TBA	"Suicide"	Eames Yates	Unknown	March 18, 2001
TBA	"Soldiers in the Army of God"	Marc Levin, Daphne Pinkerson	Daniel Voll	April 1, 2001
TBA	"Naked States"	Arlene Nelson	Unknown	April 8, 2001
TBA	"A Question of Miracles"	Antony Thomas	Antony Thomas	April 15, 2001
TBA	"Just, Melvin: Just Evil"	James Ronald Whitney	James Ronald Whitney	April 22, 2001
TBA	"Dwarfs: Not a Fairy Tale"	Lisa Abelow Hedley, Bonnie Strauss	Unknown	April 29, 2001
TBA	"Bellevue: Inside Out"	Maryann DeLeo	Unknown	May 6, 2001
TBA	"Living Dolls: The Making of a Child Beauty Queen"	Shari Cookson	Shari Cookson	May 13, 2001
TBA	"The Iceman Confesses: Secrets of a Mafia Hitman"	Arthur Ginsberg	Unknown	May 20, 2001
TBA	"LaLee's Kin: The Legacy of Cotton"	Deborah Dickson, Susan Froemke, Albert Maysles	Unknown	June 22, 2001
TBA	"Panic: A Film About Coping"	Eames Yates	Unknown	October 19, 2001
TBA	"The Young and the Dead"	Shari Springer Berman, Robert Pulcini	Unknown	October 31, 2001
TBA	"Gladiator Days: Anatomy of a Prison Murder"	Marc Levin	Unknown	January 7, 2002
TBA	"Nerve.com: Downloading Sex"	Beth B., Sandi Sissel, Tina Di Feliciantonio	Unknown	January 19, 2002
TBA	"Monica in Black and White"	Fenton Bailey, Randy Barbato	Unknown	March 3, 2002
TBA	"The Execution of Wanda Jean"	Liz Garbus	Unknown	March 17, 2002
TBA	"Murder on a Sunday Morning"	Jean-Xavier de Lestrade	Denis Poncet	March 31, 2002
TBA	"Southern Comfort"	Kate Davis	Unknown	April 19, 2002
TBA	"Small Town Ecstasy"	Jay Blumenfield	Unknown	April 28, 2002
TBA	"Blue Vinyl"	Daniel B. Gold, Judith Helfand	Unknown	May 5, 2002
TBA	"Telling Nicholas"	James Ronald Whitney	James Ronald Whitney	May 12, 2002
TBA	"The Smashing Machine: The Life and Times of Extreme Fighter Mark Kerr"	John Hyams	Unknown	May 31, 2002
TBA	"American Standoff"	Kristi Jacobson	Unknown	June 10, 2002
TBA	"Cathouse"	Patti Kaplan	George Ciccarone	December 8, 2002
TBA	"The Iceman and the Psychiatrist"	Arthur Ginsberg	Unknown	January 10, 2003
TBA	"Graduating Peter"	Gerardine Wurzburg	Unknown	January 21, 2003
TBA	"Animal Passions"	Christopher Spencer	Christopher Spencer	January 28, 2003
TBA	"Judgment Day: Should the Guilty Go Free?"	Joe Berlinger	Unknown	February 4, 2003
TBA	"Cannibal: The Real Hannibal Lecters"	Katharine English	Unknown	February 12, 2003
TBA	"The Virtual Corpse"	Kaspar Kasics	Kaspar Kasics	January 26, 2003
TBA	"Journeys with George"	Aaron Lubarsky, Alexandra Pelosi	Alexandra Pelosi	March 14, 2003
TBA	"Crank: Made in America"	Unknown	Unknown	April 7, 2003
TBA	"Persona Non Grata"	Oliver Stone	Unknown	June 5, 2003
TBA	"Pandemic: Facing AIDS"	Rory Kennedy	Mark Bailey	June 15, 2003
TBA	"Naked World"	Arlene Donnelly Nelson	Unknown	July 25, 2003
TBA	"Showgirls: Glitz and Angst"	Kirby Dick	Unknown	September 6, 2003
TBA	"Terror in Moscow"	Dan Reed	Dan Reed	October 23, 2003
TBA	"Born Rich"	Jamie Johnson	Unknown	October 27, 2003
TBA	"Cathouse 2: Back in the Saddle"	Patti Kaplan	Unknown	December 27, 2003
TBA	"Shelter Dogs"	Cynthia Wade	Unknown	January 27, 2004
TBA	"A Boy's Life"	Nick Doob, Rory Kennedy	Mark Bailey	March 24, 2004
TBA	"Looking for Fidel"	Oliver Stone	Oliver Stone	April 14, 2004
TBA	"Jockey"	Kate Davis	Unknown	April 26, 2004
TBA	"Smashed: Toxic Tales of Teens and Alcohol"	Karen Goodman, Kirk Simon	Unknown	May 14, 2004
TBA	"Three Sisters: Searching for a Cure"	Joseph F. Lovett	Unknown	May 19, 2004
TBA	"Heir to an Execution: A Granddaughter's Story"	Ivy Meeropol	Unknown	June 14, 2004
TBA	"Celibacy"	Antony Thomas	Unknown	June 28, 2004
TBA	"My Flesh and Blood"	Jonathan Karsh	Unknown	May 8, 2004
TBA	"Back in the Hood: Gang War II"	Marc Levin	Unknown	August 26, 2004
TBA	"Atlantic City Hookers: It Ain't E-Z Being a Ho'"	Brent Owens	Brent Owens	September 4, 2004
TBA	"Chernobyl Heart"	Maryann DeLeo	Unknown	September 9, 2004
TBA	"Indian Point: Imagining the Unimaginable"	Rory Kennedy	Jack Youngelson	September 13, 2004
TBA	"Aileen: Life and Death of a Serial Killer"	Nick Broomfield, Joan Churchill	Unknown	November 15, 2004
TBA	"Middle Sexes: Redefining He and She"	Antony Thomas	Antony Thomas	December 6, 2004
TBA	"Rape in a Small Town: The Florence Holway Story"	Jeffrey Chapman	Unknown	January 11, 2005
TBA	"Dope Sick Love"	Felice Conte, Brent Renaud, Craig Renaud	Unknown	March 10, 2005
TBA	"Left of the Dial"	Patrick Farrelly, Kate O'Callaghan	Unknown	March 31, 2005
TBA	"Rehab"	Steven Okazaki	Unknown	April 18, 2005
TBA	"Unknown Soldier: Searching for a Father"	John Hulme	Unknown	May 30, 2005
TBA	"Twist of Faith"	Kirby Dick	Unknown	June 28, 2005
TBA	"Latin Kings: A Street Gang Story"	Jon Alpert	Unknown	July 9, 2005
TBA	"Downtown Girls: Hookers of Honolulu"	Brent Owens	Brent Owens	August 27, 2005
TBA	"Methadonia"	Michel Negroponte	Nick Pappas	October 6, 2005
TBA	"Dealing Dogs"	Tom Simon, Sarah Teale	Unknown	February 21, 2006
TBA	"Baghdad ER"	Jon Alpert, Matthew O'Neill	Unknown	May 21, 2006
TBA	"Thin"	Lauren Greenfield	Unknown	November 14, 2006

== Accolades ==
=== Academy Award for Best Documentary Feature ===
- Crack USA: County Under Siege (nominated)
- I Am a Promise: The Children of Stanton Elementary School (won)

=== Peabody Awards ===
- The Celluloid Closet (honored)
