= Iceman =

Iceman, The Iceman, Ice Man, or Ice Men may refer to:

== People ==
- The Iceman (nickname), a list of people with the nickname
- The Iceman (performer), comedian and performance artist
- Ötzi, a.k.a. the iceman, the oldest known natural human mummy
- Ice Men or Three Ice Men, alternative names for the Ice Saints

== Film and television ==
- Iceman (1984 film), science fiction film
- Iceman (2014 film), Hong Kong-Chinese film
- Iceman (2017 film), German film
- "Iceman" (NCIS), episode of NCIS
- Ice Men (film), 2004 film starring David Hewlett
- The Iceman (film), 2012 crime thriller

== Literature ==
- The Iceman: Confessions of a Mafia Hitman, a biography of Richard Kuklinski by Philip Carl
- Iceman, a novel by Rex Miller
- Iceman, a novel by Chris Lynch
- The Iceman, a biography of Richard Kuklinski by Anthony Bruno
- "The Ice Man", a short story by Haruki Murakami included in Blind Willow, Sleeping Woman

== Fictional characters ==
- Ice Man (Caminhos do Coração), a character from Caminhos do Coração
- Ice Man (robot), a Robot Master character from the Mega Man series
- Iceman (Marvel Comics), a superhero appearing in Marvel Comics and a member of the X-Men
- Ice Man (DC Comics), two different villains appearing in DC Comics
- Michael "Iceman" Casey, a character in Wing Commander
- Ice Man, a supervillain in DC Comics who appeared in Underworld Unleashed
- "Iceman", the callsign of Lt. Tom Kazansky, a character in the film Top Gun, played by Val Kilmer

== Music ==
=== Groups ===
- Iceman (Japanese band), a J-pop groupɴ̩
- The Icemen, a hardcore punk and metal band

=== Albums ===
- Iceman (album), 2026 album by Canadian rapper Drake
- Iceman (Albert Collins album), 1991, or its title song

=== Songs ===
- "Iceman", a song by Lloyd Banks from Rotten Apple
- "Iceman", a song by Descendents from All
- "Iceman", a song by the Libertines from Anthems For Doomed Youth
- "The Iceman", a song by Macabre from Murder Metal
- "Iceman", a song by Bruce Springsteen from Tracks

== Other uses ==
- Iceman (occupation), a vendor who sells ice from a wagon or cart
- Codename: ICEMAN, a 1989 computer game released by Sierra Entertainment
- Evansville IceMen, a former minor league hockey team
- Jacksonville Icemen, a minor league hockey team
- Ibanez Iceman, a guitar and bass guitar model made by Ibanez
- IceMan, part of Pixar's RenderMan software

== See also ==
- Canadian Ice Man or Kwäday Dän Ts'ìnchi, the oldest preserved human remains found in North America
- Minnesota Iceman, a purported man-like "missing link" frozen in ice and displayed in and around Minnesota in the 1960s
- The Iceman Cometh (disambiguation)
