= American Standoff =

- Directed by: Kristi Jacobson
- Produced by: Sheila Nevins; Barbara Kopple
- Cinematography: Kristi Jacobson, Kirsten Johnson, Tom Kaufman, Bob Maraist
- Edited by: Bob Eisenhardt
- Music by: Joel Goodman
- Release date: 2002
- Running time: 95 minutes
- Country: United States
- Language: English

American Standoff is a 2002 American documentary film by Kristi Jacobson which documents much of a strike by the Teamsters against a package delivery company, Overnite Transportation (now a subsidiary of United Parcel Service). The film follows the strike from early 2000 to mid-2001.

== Synopsis ==
The Teamsters' strike against Overnite began on October 24, 1999. James P. Hoffa had been elected president of the Teamsters in the fall of 1998, and had campaigned on a promise to unionize Overnite and securing a contract for its 13,000 workers. The Teamsters represented only a fraction of Overnite's workers, but believed they could use other means to win company recognition of the union. Initially, about 2,000 workers walked the picket line in 12 states. The strike turned violent, however, and both sides accused the other of bribery, spying, intimidation and more. By August 2002, only 300 to 600 workers remained on strike. The Teamsters called the strike off without securing a contract or union recognition.

American Standoff focuses primarily on two Teamster members and a staff organizer and how they are affected by the strike. However, the film roves over the entire United States, visiting Memphis, Atlanta, Chicago, Boston, and Las Vegas.

The strike is placed in the context of Hoffa's struggle to secure his political base within the Teamsters' union. Hoffa not only faced political attacks from union reformers but also from other union leaders who believed they could unseat the newly elected president in the 2002 election. The internecine struggle for power in the Teamsters limits the effectiveness of the union's response, although Hoffa appears to emerge strengthened.

The film concludes in mid-2001, with the strike still lingering, workers increasingly disenchanted, and the union struggling to find an acceptable exit strategy.

== Critical reception ==
American Standoff was financed in part by HBO. The cable network aired the documentary on June 10, 2002, on its "America Undercover" series. Sheila Nevins of HBO took an executive producer credit on the film.

Critical reviews of the film were qualified, but generally positive. Variety's review was typical: "Standoff, produced by two-time Academy Award winner Barbara Kopple and directed by protegee Kristi Jacobson, lacks the extraordinary clarity of Kopple's 1991 "American Dream." But pic still packs an emotional wallop, dwelling effectively on the pain and confusion of strike organizers as they run out of options."

The documentary also screened at the 2002 Sundance Film Festival.
