= The Iceman (nickname) =

The Iceman or Iceman is a nickname of:

== Arts and entertainment ==
- Magni Ásgeirsson (born 1978), Icelandic singer, songwriter, and musician
- Jerry Butler (born 1939), American soul singer
- Albert Collins (1932–1993), American electric blues guitarist and singer
- Anthony Irvine (born 1951), British performer and visual artist
- Steve November (born 1972), British television producer
- Vanilla Ice, American rapper Rob Van Winkle (born 1967)
- Etika, online alias of American rapper and model Desmond Amofah (1990–2019)
- Drake (born 1986), Canadian rapper, singer and musician

== Sports ==
=== American football ===
- Caleb Williams (born 2001), American National Football League quarterback
- Ike Charlton (born 1977), American former National Football League defensive back
- Carlos Huerta (born 1969), American former National Football League placekicker
- Adam Vinatieri (born 1972), American former National Football League placekicker

=== Auto racing ===
- Scott Dixon (born 1980), New Zealand 6x IndyCar Champion
- Terry Labonte (born 1956), American NASCAR driver
- Scott Moninger (born 1966), American retired road racing cyclist
- Kimi Räikkönen (born 1979), Finnish Formula 1 World Champion
- Marcus Grönholm (born 1968) Finnish 2x WRC Champion

=== Basketball ===
- Wendell Alexis (born 1964), American basketball player
- George Gervin (born 1952), American retired National Basketball Association player

=== Billiards ===
- Bjorn Haneveer (born 1976), Belgian retired snooker player
- Stephen Hendry (born 1969), Scottish retired professional snooker player, 7x World Snooker Champion
- Mika Immonen (born 1972), Finnish professional pool player

=== Darts ===
- Gerwyn Price (born 1985), Welsh darts player
- Alan Warriner-Little (born 1962), English retired darts player

=== Association football ===
- Dennis Bergkamp (born 1969), Dutch footballer
- Sam Isemonger (born 1978), Australian former rugby league footballer
- Victor Lindelöf (born 1994), Swedish footballer
- John Ruddy (born 1986), English football goalkeeper

=== Combat sports ===
- Chuck Liddell (born 1969), American MMA fighter and UFC Hall of Famer
- Milton McCrory (born 1962), American WBC world welterweight boxing champion
- Vernon Paris (born 1988), American boxer
- Viktor Postol (born 1984), Ukrainian WBC world light-welterweight boxing champion
- Iceman John Scully (born 1967), American boxer
- Jean-Yves Thériault (born 1955), Canadian kickboxer
- Dean Malenko (born 1960), American professional wrestler

=== Other sports ===
- Björn Borg (born 1956), Swedish tennis player
- Ryan Bukvich (born 1978), American former Major League Baseball relief pitcher
- Bernard Foley (born 1989), Australian rugby player
- Retief Goosen (born 1969), South African golfer
- Al Hackner (born 1954), Canadian Hall-of-Fame curler
- Hreinn Halldórsson (born 1949), Icelandic shot putter
- Michael Jones (rugby union) (born 1965), New Zealand former rugby union player and coach
- Damien Thomlinson, former Australian Army commando, swimmer, para-snowboarder, and author
- Steve Waugh (born 1965), Australian former cricketer
- George Woolf (1910–1946), Canadian jockey
- Isaac Howard (born 2004), American Ice Hockey Player for the Edmonton Oilers of the National Hockey League

== Other fields ==
- Brad Colbert (born 1974), American Marine featured in the 2004 book Generation Kill by Evan Wright
- Wim Hof (born 1959), Dutch adventurer, the world-record holder for the longest ice bath
- Manadel al-Jamadi (died 2003), Iraqi prisoner tortured to death at Abu Ghraib
- Richard Kuklinski (1935–2006), American serial killer
- Mark Fellows (hitman) (born 1980), convicted English hitman
- Jeff Lisandro, Australian poker player
- Ötzi, a well-preserved natural mummy

== See also ==
- The Iceman (disambiguation)
- Red Grange (1903–1991), American college football and National Football League player nicknamed "The Wheaton Iceman"
- Ben Hogan (1912–1997), American golfer nicknamed "The Wee Iceman"
- Henrik Nielsen (footballer, born 1971), Danish retired footballer nicknamed Ismand (Iceman)
