= And the Pursuit of Happiness =

1986 film by Louis Malle

- DVD Cover
- Directed by: Louis Malle
- Produced by: James Bruce
- Narrated by: Louis Malle
- Cinematography: Louis Malle
- Edited by: Nancy Baker
- Distributed by: HBO
- Release date: 1986
- Running time: 80 minutes
- Country: United States
- Language: English

And the Pursuit of Happiness (French: La poursuite du bonheur) is a 1986 documentary film for television directed by Louis Malle about the experiences of immigrants in the United States during the 1980s. It was originally released as part of HBO's America Undercover series on Independence Day 1986. The film "appeared at a time when immigrants from Latin America and Asia for the first time outnumbered those coming from Europe". It was screened in the Un Certain Regard section at the 1987 Cannes Film Festival. It was released on public television in 1988 and won a Peabody Award the following year.

== Cast ==
- Louis Malle as narrator
- General José R. Somoza as himself
- Derek Walcott as himself
- Franklin Chang-Díaz as himself
