= Capture Kill Release =

2016 found footage horror film by Nick McAnulty

- Official poster
- Directed by: Nick McAnulty; Brian Allan Stewart
- Written by: Nick McAnulty
- Produced by: Nick McAnulty
- Starring: Jennifer Fraser; Farhang Ghajar
- Release date: 19 October 2016 (Shriekfest)
- Running time: 96 minutes
- Country: Canada
- Language: English

Capture Kill Release is a 2016 Canadian found footage horror feature film directed by Nick McAnulty and Brian Allan Stewart, and written by Nick McAnulty, about a couple plotting to murder a random stranger just for the thrill of it, but one of them decides not to go through with it.

The movie was named by Blumhouse Productions one of the "5 new intelligent found footage films people need to see".

== Plot ==
The movie follows a young couple, Jennifer and Farhang, as they document their plan to commit a premeditated murder for the thrill of it.

Jennifer, the more dominant and sadistic of the two, is obsessed with the idea of killing a random person. She meticulously prepares for the crime, purchasing tools like saws, plastic sheets, and cleaning supplies, while recording everything on a handheld camera. Farhang, initially going along with her plans out of love and curiosity, begins to have doubts as the reality of their intentions sets in.

The couple eventually selects their victim—a homeless man—and lure him into their home under the pretense of offering help. However, as they attempt to carry out the murder, Farhang's hesitation creates tension between him and Jennifer. She grows increasingly frustrated with his reluctance and lack of commitment, revealing her deeply unhinged nature.

As the film progresses, Jennifer's obsession spirals out of control. When Farhang finally tries to back out, Jennifer turns on him, seeing his weakness as a betrayal. This leads to a gruesome and shocking climax where Jennifer fully embraces her psychopathy, proving that her need for violence goes beyond a single act.

== Cast ==
- Jennifer Fraser as Jennifer
- Farhang Ghajar as Farhang

== Production ==
Around 25% of the film was shot with two other actors before the footage was scrapped and re-shot with the final leads.

== Release ==
The movie premiered at the Shriekfest Horror Film Festival on October 19, 2016.

== Reception ==
=== Critical response ===
On review aggregation website Rotten Tomatoes, the film has an approval rating of 50% based on 4 reviews.

Dread Central called it "the perfect anti-romance found footage horror", and Certified Forgotten said that "Capture Kill Release bears a chilling ability to challenge the cores of horror cinema, forgoing a typical experience of shock value for shock value’s sake. Instead, it is about probing cinema’s visceral qualities."

=== Lists ===
- Blumhouse Productions: "A New Wave of Intelligent Found Footage: 5 Films You Need to See"
- Dread Central: "10 Weird Found Footage Movies That Will Blow Your Mind"

== See also ==
- List of films featuring psychopaths and sociopaths
