= Shock Video =

Documentary series

Shock Video is a series of hour-long documentaries that aired on HBO between 1993 and 2004. They were produced by Fenton Bailey and Randy Barbato through their company World of Wonder. The first installment examines the rise and effects of camcorders and video surveillance. The 1995 sequel focuses on graphic footage shown in criminal trials. Both were aired as part of HBO's America Undercover series. Subsequent installments of Shock Video serve as compilations of clips from around the world which are typically sexual in nature.

== Installments ==
=== Shock Video (1993) ===
The original Shock Video aired on HBO on December 14, 1993. It was part of HBO's America Undercover series, and aired as an hour-long program. It was directed and produced by Fenton Bailey and Randy Barbato, originally for Channel 4 in England, where it was released as Videos, Vigilantes and Voyeurism before being picked up by HBO. The documentary examines the rising popularity of camcorders and surveillance cameras, and uses a compilation of footage to demonstrate the consequences that they have on society. At the time, an estimated 40 million people owned a camcorder.

Bailey was inspired to make the documentary after seeing George Holliday's videotaped footage of the 1991 Rodney King beating. Bailey said, "For years, we've all been brought up to believe that (George Orwell's) '1984' is the real fear, that Big Brother is going to be watching you. But this (documentary) suggests something completely different: a society where everybody is watching everybody else". Bailey and Barbato spent six months researching the topic of camcorders and surveillance. Among the featured footage is amateur pornography, a nanny caught engaging in child abuse, and the King beating. The documentary also includes a look at the use of camera footage in legal cases.

The name Shock Video is a reference to the 1970 book Future Shock by Alvin Toffler, who also appears in the documentary. It also includes appearances by lawyers William Kunstler and Alan Dershowitz, as well as Jonathan Turley and Fox News president Van Gordon Sauter, all commenting on the potential negative impact of a surveillance society.

Walter Goodman of The New York Times wrote, "Despite the sound bites about security versus privacy, 'Shock Video' is too busy running juicy examples, like do-it-yourself porn movies, to go more deeply into the issues that it raises". James Endrst of Hartford Courant wrote, "Try as it does to drape itself with philosophy, however, 'Shock Video' can't avoid exposing itself as little more than another piece of cheap exploitation -- a reflection of its own supposed nightmare". The Virginian-Pilot wrote that the most "shocking thing" about the program "is that any self-respecting cable channel would show it", stating, "It's easily the sleaziest episode in a generally sleazy series, 'America Undercover'". Drew Voros of Variety wrote that the "biggest impact, rightfully played up here, is how the Everyman has become deputized with the introduction of camcorders".

=== Shock Video 2 (1995) ===
Shock Video 2: The Show Business of Crime and Punishment aired on HBO on July 15, 1995. Like its predecessor, it is an hour-long program and part of the America Undercover series. It is narrated by Peter Thomas, and focuses on video footage used in criminal trials. It features the graphic footage that is viewed by juries, such as videotaped confessions, crime scenes, and criminal acts such as a rape. Other footage includes the trials of O. J. Simpson and the Menéndez brothers, the videotaped death of actor Vic Morrow, and a session between Dr. Jack Kevorkian and a patient prior to the latter's death by assisted suicide. It also documents the controversy over televising trials, as well as proposals to air executions. Phil Donahue, Steven Brill, and Jeffrey Toobin make appearances, voicing support for cameras in courtrooms, and Donahue also speaks in favor of a live televised execution.

Robert Koehler, writing for the Los Angeles Times, wrote that "as we're deep into the O.J. trial, much of 'Shock Video 2' isn't all that shocking". The New York Daily News called it "a shameless, sleazy, exploitive, hypocritical piece of claptrap, the sins of which equal or exceed any of those it claims to expose". Ray Loynd of Variety wrote that "the visual distinction between a cop's handwritten report utilized by prosecutors and a wrenching video chronicle of the same scene is ample justification for the use of video".

Bailey acknowledged that some viewers may consider the program to be sensationalist: "The challenge is how you discuss something, the context in which you put it. We wanted to illustrate the process of crime and punishment from beginning to end, and that includes sometimes showing the crime". Bailey considered television ideal for "exploring our voyeuristic tendencies", stating, "If you look at its history, every few years it presses the boundaries to where it's never gone".

=== Others (1996–2004) ===
Subsequent installments of Shock Video focus primarily on various clips from around the world that are typically of a sexual nature. Shock Video 3 aired on HBO in 1996, and World of Wonder would produce roughly a dozen more installments, including Shock Video 2002, narrated by Maureen McCormick. Segments in the 2002 installment include couples who engage in sexual intercourse in front of a panel of judges; a three-man contest to see who can ejaculate the most in a 24-hour period; and topless women who participate in a relay race, in which they take turns licking whipped cream off of each other's nipples. Shock Video 2004: Too Hot for the Box was aired in 2003, and includes nude chefs in Canada, and bowling strippers in Germany. The series continued airing new installments as late as December 2004, with the release of Shock Video 2005: Naughty by Nation.
