= List of films featuring psychopaths and sociopaths =

List of films featuring psychopaths and sociopaths.

Film	Year	Ref.
Agni Sakshi	1996	
Aguirre, the Wrath of God	1972	
Aileen: Life and Death of a Serial Killer	2003	
American Psycho	2000	
Angst	1983	
Anjaam	1994	
Apocalypse Now	1979	
Audition	1999	
The Bad Seed	1956	
Basic Instinct	1992	
Blade Runner	1982	
Be My Cat: A Film for Anne	2015	
Blue Velvet	1986	
Bonnie and Clyde	1967	
Mr. Brooks	2007	
The Cable Guy	1996	
Cape Fear	1991	
Capture Kill Release	2016	
Child of Rage	1992	
Child of Rage: A Story of Abuse	1990	
A Clockwork Orange	1971	
The Cook, the Thief, His Wife & Her Lover	1989	
Creep	2014	
The Dark Knight	2008	
Darr	1993	
Dead Man Walking	1995	
The Devil's Rejects	2005	
Dr. No	1962	
Drive	2011	
Dushman	1998	
Ek Villain	2014	
Falling Down	1993	
Fatal Attraction	1987	
Funny Games	1997	
The Godfather	1972	
The Good Son	1993	
Goodfellas	1990	
Gone Girl	2014	
Gladiator	2000	
Gupt: The Hidden Truth	1997	
Halloween	1978	
Hard Candy	2005	
Hemet, or the Landlady Don't Drink Tea	2023	
Henry: Portrait of a Serial Killer	1986	
High Tension	2003	
The Hitcher	1986	
The Hills Have Eyes	1977	
The House That Jack Built	2018	
The Human Centipede (first sequence)	2009	
I Care a Lot	2020	
The Iceman Tapes: Conversations with a Killer	1992	
The Iceman Confesses: Secrets of a Mafia Hitman	2001	
The Iceman and the Psychiatrist	2003	
In the Company of Men	1997	
Inglourious Basterds	2009	
Ichi the Killer	2001	
Joker	2019	
Kaun?	1999	
The King of Comedy	1982	
The Last House on the Left	1972	
Leave Her to Heaven	1945	
Leon: The Professional	1994	
M	1931	
Malice	1993	
Man Bites Dog	1992	
Manhunter	1986	
Marathon Man	1976	
Martha Marcy May Marlene	2011	
Misery	1990	
Mommie Dearest	1981	
Murder 2	2011	
Natural Born Killers	1994	
The Night of the Hunter	1955	
Nightcrawler	2014	
No Country for Old Men	2007	
One Hour Photo	2002	
One Flew Over the Cuckoo's Nest	1975	
Pan's Labyrinth	2006	
Pearl	2022	
Peeping Tom	1960	
Play Misty for Me	1971	
Promising Young Woman	2020	
Psycho	1960	
Raman Raghav 2.0	2016	
Red Rose	1980	
Reservoir Dogs	1992	
Sangharsh	1999	
Schindler's List	1993	
Seven	1995	
Seven Psychopaths	2012	
Sexy Beast	2000	
The Shining	1980	
The Silence of the Lambs	1991	
Snowtown	2011	
The Talented Mr. Ripley	1999	
Taxi Driver	1976	
The Texas Chain Saw Massacre	1974	
There Will Be Blood	2007	
Thoroughbreds	2017	
Titanic	1997	
The Untouchables	1987	
Tusk	2014	
Wall Street	1987	
We Need to Talk about Kevin	2011	
What About Bob?	1991	
What Ever Happened to Baby Jane?	1962	
Wolf Creek	2005	
Wrong Turn	2003	
Zero Day	2003	
Zodiac	2007	

== See also ==
- Fictional portrayals of psychopaths
