= The Iceman Cometh (disambiguation) =

The Iceman Cometh is a 1939 play by Eugene O'Neill.

The Iceman Cometh may also refer to:

== Film and TV ==
- "The Iceman Cometh" (The Play of the Week), November 14 and 21, 1960 two-episode NTA broadcast of O'Neill's play, directed by Sidney Lumet
- The Iceman Cometh (1973 film), American Film Theatre production of O'Neill's play, directed by John Frankenheimer
- The Iceman Cometh (1989 film) (Ji dong ji xia), Hong Kong martial arts fantasy directed by Clarence Fok Yiu-leung
- The Iceman Cometh (2014 film), Hong Kong–Chinese 3D martial arts action-comedy remake of 1989 film, a/k/a Iceman

== Music ==
- The Ice Man Cometh (album), 1968 album by American performer Jerry Butler

== See also ==
- Iceman (disambiguation)
