= Out at Work =

1997 American documentary film about LGBTQ employment discrimination

- Directed by: Tami Gold; Kelly Anderson
- Produced by: Tami Gold; Kelly Anderson
- Cinematography: Tami Gold
- Edited by: Kelly Anderson
- Music by: Don Dinicola
- Production company: New Day Films
- Distributed by: HBO
- Release date: 1997
- Running time: 56 minutes
- Country: United States
- Language: English
- Budget: $65,000

Out at Work is a 1997 American documentary film directed by Tami Gold and Kelly Anderson about LGBTQ employment discrimination and the importance of labor unions. The original version premiered at Sundance Film Festival and an updated version was aired on HBO in 1999 as part of its America Undercover series.

== Premise ==
The original documentary follows three LGBTQ employees who experienced employment discrimination:

- Cheryl Summerville, a lesbian who was fired from a Georgian Cracker Barrel in 1991 for "failing to demonstrate normal heterosexual values."
- Ron Woods, a gay Chrysler electrician in Detroit who was ostracized and threatened by his co-workers after asking his local chapter of the United Auto Workers to boycott Cracker Barrell.
- Nat Keitt, a gay and gender nonconforming library employee who fought against the New York Public Library to get domestic-partner health coverage for his partner suffering from HIV/AIDS.

The HBO version replaced Keitt with the story of Mark Anderson, a gay stockbroker who was forced to leave Century City's Cantor Fitzgerald in 1998 due to sexual harassment.

== Production and release ==
The documentary was conceived by Gold and Anderson after they attended the inaugural lesbian and gay labor caucus, held by District Council 37, in 1992 and was inspired by Gold's experiences of homphobia while working at a Maxwell House in the 1970s. It was filmed between 1992 and 1995. The production had a budget of $65,000 and was funded primarily through donations by organizations such as the United Auto Workers, United Steelworkers, AFSCME, Service Employees International Union, and Astraea Lesbian Foundation for Justice.

The film was originally considered for PBS's POV series, but was ultimately rejected. It was then picked up by HBO, who were seeking labor documentaries in the wake of the Employment Non-Discrimination Act. HBO executives told Gold and Anderson that it could only be aired on the conditioned that the narrative was streamlined to focus on people forced out of the workplace due to discrimination. Controversially, this led to the replacement of Keitt. Several activists at the time, such as Congressional Black Caucus aide Donna Cruz, criticized this decision and aruged that Keitt was actually removed because HBO did not want to feature the story of a poor, black, HIV-positive gay man.

A DVD with both versions of the film was released in 2009, with a new epilogue containing updates about the stories and anti-discrimination legislation.

== Awards ==
Year	Nominee / work	Award	Result
2000	Out at Work	CINE Golden Eagle Award	Won
2000	Out at Work	GLAAD Media Award for Outstanding Documentary	Won
2000	Out at Work	National Educational Media Network's Gold Apple Award	Won
