= Kenneth Paul Rosenberg =

American psychiatrist, filmmaker, director, producer, writer, narrator

- Born: Philadelphia, Pennsylvania, United States
- Education: Albert Einstein College of Medicine; New York University; Cornell University Medical Center
- Occupations: psychiatrist, filmmaker
- Notable work: Bedlam; Cancer: Evolution to Revolution; Through Madness
- Website: DrKenRosenberg.com

Kenneth Paul Rosenberg is an American psychiatrist known for his clinical work in psychotherapy and for his popular films and books.

== Early life ==
Rosenberg was raised in Philadelphia, studied medicine in New York City, and completed his residency at the Cornell University Medical Center, where he remains on faculty.

== Career ==
Rosenberg was a medical student at the Albert Einstein College of Medicine while simultaneously studying documentary filmmaking at New York University to make verité documentaries under the tutelage of David W. Preven, to present compassionate and realistic portraits of patients for teaching medical students about the subjective experience of illness. He maintains a private practice in Manhattan.

=== Film ===
Rosenberg's first film for a non-professional audience, An Alzheimer's Story (1984), was directed and produced with veteran cinema verité editor Ruth Neuwald Falcon, praised in a review in The New England Journal of Medicine and shown on PBS. During his fellowship, a Cornell-based foundation started by Dr. Alan Manevitz, supported Rosenberg's fellowship in the Public Health and Psychiatry Departments at Cornell Medical College while he directed and produced his first film on serious mental illness, Through Madness (1992), which won a New York Emmy for Outstanding Documentary Programming. While developing his medical practice in psychiatry, Rosenberg directed films for HBO — the Oscar Documentary Feature Shortlist film Why Am I Gay?: Stories of Coming Out in America (1994), co-produced with Lisa F. Jackson, Back from Madness (1996), and Drinking Apart (2000) — and won a Peabody Award as executive producer with Sheila Nevins for an HBO special on cancer treatment, Cancer: Evolution to Revolution (2000). His most recent film, Bedlam (2019), produced with Peter Miller, was shown at the 2019 Sundance Film Festival.

=== Books ===
Rosenberg is co-editor with Laura Feder of the addiction textbook, Behavioral Addictions (2014), and he is the author of two trade books, Infidelity (2018) and Bedlam (2019), which was written with Jessica DuLong.
