= Sheila Nevins =

American television producer (born 1939)

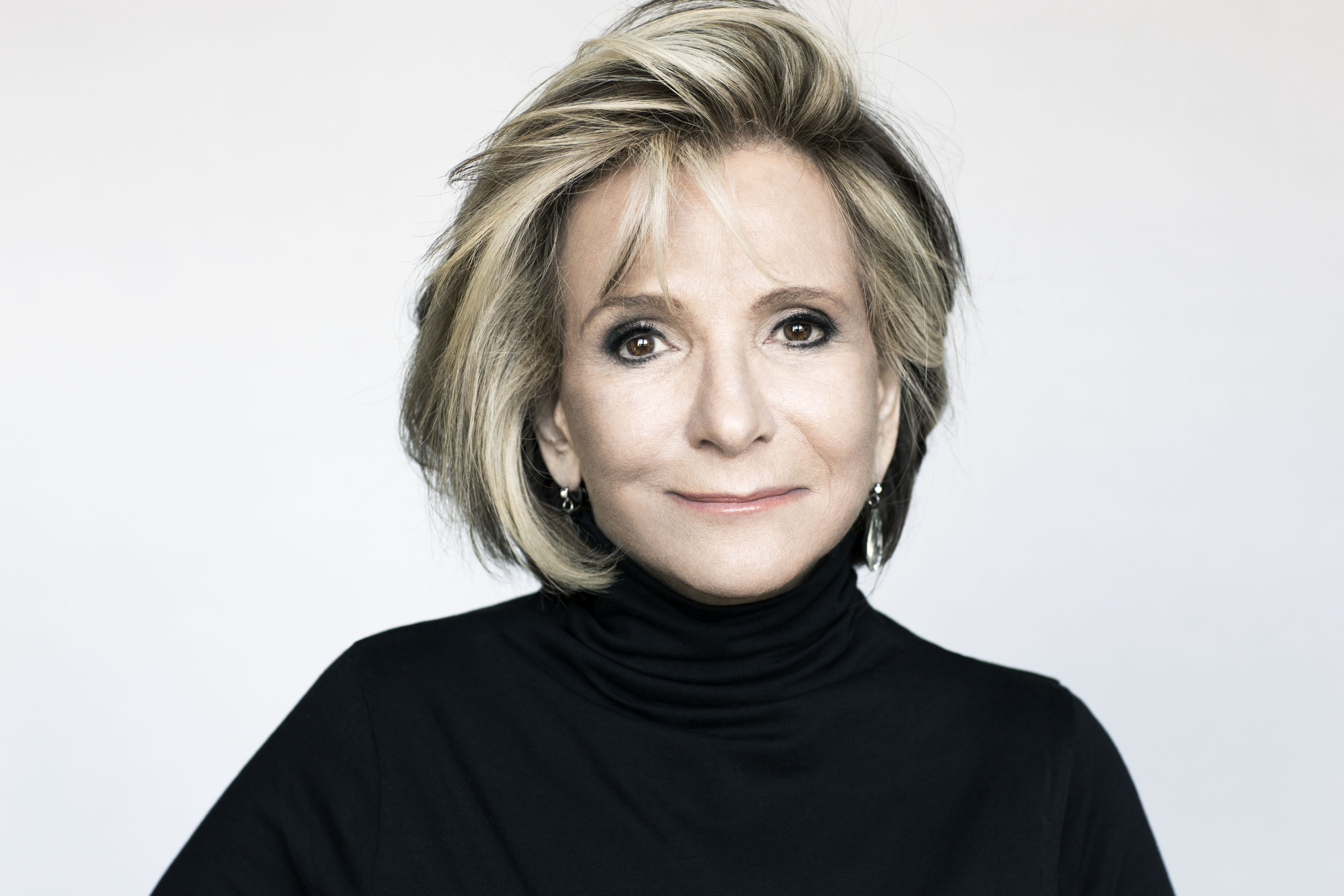
- Nevins in 2014
- Born: April 6, 1939 (age 87); Manhattan, New York U.S.
- Education: Little Red School House; High School of Performing Arts
- Alma mater: Barnard College; Yale School of Drama
- Occupations: Television producer documentary filmmaker author
- Years active: 1960–present
- Known for: President of HBO Documentary Films

Sheila Nevins (born April 6, 1939) is an American television producer and former head of MTV Documentary Films division of MTV Entertainment Studios. Previously, Nevins was the president of HBO Documentary Films, where she produced over 1,000 documentary films. She has worked on productions that have been recognized with 35 News and Documentary Emmy Awards, 42 Peabody Awards, and 26 Academy Awards. Nevins has won 31 individual Primetime Emmy Awards, more than any other person. She is also a member of the board of directors for the Peabody Awards.

== Early life and education ==
Nevins was born on the Lower East Side of Manhattan to Jewish parents Stella Nevins (née Rosenberg), a chemist, and Benjamin Nevins, a Russian immigrant post office worker who was also a bookie. Nevins' family was very poor and her mother suffered from an acute form of Raynaud's disease, which resulted in amputations of her limbs, and scleroderma. Nevins has a younger sister (born 1946) who is a doctor.

Due to the generosity of her uncle, who was a wealthy inventor, Nevins attended private schools growing up. Nevins attended Little Red School House and the High School of Performing Arts in New York City.

She received a BA in English from Barnard College in 1960. In 1963 she received an MFA in Directing from the Yale School of Drama, where she was one of two women in the directing program.

== Career ==
In the 1960s, Nevins began her career at the United States Information Agency in Washington, D.C. She was hired to play a secretary in the USIA TV series called Adventures in English, which was created to teach English vocabulary, which her character repeated, in foreign countries. Nevins then worked as a researcher, cataloging historical footage about World War II at the Library of Congress. Nevins said that this immersive work inspired her to shift focus from the fictional world of theater to the fact-based world of documented in film.

From 1970 to 1973, after moving back to New York, Nevins apprenticed with director Don Mischer and producer Bob Squire. Nevins then got a job as a researcher on Al Perlmutter's groundbreaking Channel 13 TV show The Great American Dream Machine, eventually working her way up to doing segments and "man on the street" interviews. Nevins also worked as a director. Inspired by the film Salesman, she hired Albert and David Maysles to direct parts of the show.

In 1973, Nevins was a Field Producer for The Reasoner Report on ABC News.

From 1973 to 1975, Nevins wrote for Time-Life Films. She worked briefly for 20/20. Nevins declined Don Hewitt's invitation to be a producer for 60 Minutes.

In 1975 she began working as a writer and producer for the Children's Television Workshop. She also worked at Scribner making recordings of books for blind people. Nevins was a researcher then associate producer for The Great American Dream Machine on National Educational Television.

In 1978 and 1979, Nevins was a producer for the CBS News magazine Who's Who.

=== HBO ===
In 1979, Nevins was hired by HBO as director of documentary programming on a 13-week contract. She continued in that position until 1982.

From 1983 to 1985, Nevins had a production company called Spinning Reels and created the animated educational program Braingames.

In 1986, Nevins returned to HBO as vice president of documentary programming. In 1995, she became the senior vice president of original programming. Nevin's tenure at HBO saw the rise of sexually themed programming in the America Undercover documentary series.

From 1999 to 2003, Nevins was the executive vice president of original programming at HBO. In 1998, Nevins said that she produced 12 documentaries a year at HBO, with budgets that were typically US$600,000 in 1998 dollars.

Nevins was HBO's President of Documentary and Family Programming from 2004 to 2018.

In March 2018, Nevins retired from her position at HBO.

=== Writing ===
In 2007, Nevins wrote the foreword to the book Addiction: Why Can't They Just Stop?, which was based on the HBO documentary series of the same name, and was produced in association with the Robert Wood Johnson Foundation and the National Institute on Alcohol Abuse and Alcoholism.

In 2017, Nevins published a memoir, You Don't Look Your Age... and Other Fairy Tales. Nevins explores concepts of aging, youth, and experience. Some of the book features lightly fictionalized vignettes and poetry. Kathy Bates, Gloria Vanderbilt, Lily Tomlin, Martha Stewart, Meryl Streep, RuPaul, among many others, contributed audio performances to the audio version of the book.

== Personal life ==
In 1963, Nevins married a lawyer who also attended Yale. Though she'd wanted to pursue a theater career, her husband wanted her to be home evenings and weekends, which meant she had to find herself a "regular" job. That marriage eventually ended in divorce.

In 1972, Nevins married investment banker Sidney Koch. The pair had a home in Litchfield, Connecticut, and an apartment on the Upper East Side of Manhattan. They have one son, David Koch (born 1980). She has discussed her son's struggle with Tourette syndrome and her struggle to be a working mother with a son who was ill. Nevins has said that the 2007 HBO series, Addiction, was inspired by her son's struggles with substance abuse.

Nevins produced an HBO documentary about the Triangle Shirtwaist Factory fire called Triangle: Remembering the Fire, to which she had a personal connection, which she found out about after seeing the documentary Schmatta. Nevins' great-aunt Celia Gittlin, a 17-year-old immigrant from Russia, had died in the fire.

== Honors and awards ==
- 2000: Broadcasting & Cable Hall of Fame
- 2005: Lifetime Achievement Emmy Award
- 2008: Gotham Awards, Tribute Award – shared with Penélope Cruz, Melvin Van Peebles, and Gus Van Sant
- 2009: Academy of Television Arts & Sciences Governors Award
- 2011: Directors Guild of America, Power 100
- 2013: Women's Project Theater, Woman of Achievement Award
- 2013: International Festival of Arts & Ideas, Visionary Leadership Award

=== Academy Awards ===
- 2024: Best Documentary Short Film nomination for The ABCs of Book Banning
- 2026: Best Documentary Short Film nomination for Children No More: "Were and Are Gone"

=== Peabody Awards ===
- 1981: Peabody Award for She's Nobody's Baby: The History of American Women in the 20th Century – shared by HBO and Ms. magazine
- 1999: Peabody Award, Personal Award
- 2006: Peabody Award for Baghdad ER
- 2013: Peabody Award for Mea Maxima Culpa: Silence in the House of God and for Life According to Sam

=== Primetime Emmy Awards ===
- 1995: Outstanding Informational Special for One Survivor Remembers
- 1995: Outstanding Informational Special for Taxicab Confessions
- 1995: Outstanding Children's Program for Going, Going, Almost Gone! Animals in Danger
- 1997: Outstanding Informational Special for Without Pity: A Film About Abilities
- 1997: Outstanding Children's Program for How Do You Spell God?
- 1999: Outstanding Nonfiction Special for Thug Life in D.C.
- 2000: Outstanding Nonfiction Special for Children in War
- 2000: Outstanding Children's Program for Goodnight Moon & Other Sleepytime Tales
- 2003: Outstanding Children's Program for Through a Child's Eyes: September 11, 2001
- 2004: Outstanding Variety, Music or Comedy Special for Elaine Stritch at Liberty
- 2004: Outstanding Children's Program for Happy to Be Nappy and Other Stories of Me
- 2005: Outstanding Children's Program for Classical Baby
- 2005: Exceptional Merit in Documentary Filmmaking for Death in Gaza
- 2006: Outstanding Children's Program for I Have Tourette's but Tourette's Doesn't Have Me
- 2006: Exceptional Merit in Documentary Filmmaking for Baghdad ER
- 2007: Outstanding Nonfiction Special for Ghosts of Abu Ghraib
- 2007: Exceptional Merit in Documentary Filmmaking for When the Levees Broke: A Requiem in Four Acts
- 2008: Outstanding Children's Program for Classical Baby (I'm Grown Up Now): The Poetry Show
- 2008: Exceptional Merit in Documentary Filmmaking for White Light/Black Rain: The Destruction of Hiroshima and Nagasaki
- 2009: Exceptional Merit in Documentary Filmmaking for The Alzheimer's Project: The Memory Loss Tapes
- 2009: Outstanding Children's Nonfiction Program for The Alzheimer's Project: Grandpa, Do You Know Who I Am? with Maria Shriver
- 2010: Outstanding Nonfiction Special for Teddy: In His Own Words
- 2011: Outstanding Children's Program for A Child's Garden of Poetry
- 2013: Outstanding Documentary or Nonfiction Special for Manhunt: The Search for Bin Laden
- 2013: Exceptional Merit in Documentary Filmmaking for Mea Maxima Culpa: Silence in the House of God
- 2014: Outstanding Children's Program for One Last Hug: Three Days at Grief Camp
- 2014: Exceptional Merit in Documentary Filmmaking for Life According to Sam
- 2015: Outstanding Children's Program for Alan Alda and the Actor Within You: A YoungArts Masterclass
- 2015: Outstanding Documentary or Nonfiction Special for Going Clear: Scientology and the Prison of Belief
- 2016: Exceptional Merit in Documentary Filmmaking for Jim: The James Foley Story
- 2018: Outstanding Documentary or Nonfiction Special for The Zen Diaries of Garry Shandling

=== News & Documentary Emmy Awards ===
- 1993: Special Classification for Outstanding News and Documentary Individual Achievement for America Undercover - Multiple Personalities: The Search for Deadly Memories
- 1997: Outstanding Informational or Cultural Programming for The Search for Mother Russia's Children
- 1997: Outstanding Investigative Journalism for Calling the Ghosts
- 1997: Special Classification for Outstanding News and Documentary Program Achievement for A Kill for a Kill
- 1997: Special Classification for Outstanding News and Documentary Program Achievement for Breathing Lessons: The Life and Work of Mark O'Brien
- 1998: Outstanding Informational or Cultural Programming for Kids of Survival: The Life and Art of Tim Rollins & K.O.S.
- 1998: Outstanding Investigative Journalism for Waco: The Rules of Engagement
- 1998: Outstanding Investigative Journalism for Teen Killers: A Second Chance?
- 1998: Special Classification for Outstanding News and Documentary Program Achievement for Life of Crime 2
- 1999: Outstanding News and Documentary Program Achievement for The Cruise
- 2000: Outstanding Historical Programming with Limited Dramatization for The Children of Chabannes
- 2000: Outstanding Investigative Journalism for Crimes of Honor
- 2001: Outstanding Investigative Journalism - Long Form for The Carpet Slaves: Stolen Children of India
- 2002: Outstanding Informational Programming - Long Form for Telling Nicholas
- 2003: Outstanding Cultural and Artistic Programming - Long Form for Spellbound
- 2004: Best Documentary for My Flesh and Blood
- 2004: Outstanding Cultural and Artistic Programming - Long Form for Bus 174
- 2006: Best Documentary for God Sleeps in Rwanda
- 2007: Outstanding Investigative Journalism - Long Form for Have You Seen Andy?
- 2008: Outstanding Arts & Culture Programming for The Art of Failure: Chuck Connelly Not for Sale
- 2009: Outstanding Informational Programming - Long Form for Which Way Home
- 2010: Outstanding Science and Technology Programming for Google Baby
- 2011: Outstanding Historical Programming - Long Form for Reagan
- 2012: Best Documentary for Saving Face
- 2012: Outstanding Arts & Culture Programming for Marina Abramović: The Artist Is Present
- 2012: Outstanding Historical Programming - Long Form for The Loving Story
- 2013: Outstanding Informational Programming - Long Form for The Crash Reel
- 2014: Outstanding Arts and Culture Programming for Dangerous Acts Starring the Unstable Elements of Belarus
- 2015: Outstanding Arts and Culture Programming for Very Semi-Serious: A Partially Thorough Portrait of New Yorker Cartoonists
- 2016: Best Documentary for A Girl in the River: The Price of Forgiveness
- 2017: Outstanding Investigative Documentary for Solitary: Inside Red Onion State Prison
- 2018: Best Documentary for I Am Evidence
- 2023: Outstanding Arts and Culture Documentary for Art & Krimes by Krimes
- 2023: Outstanding Crime and Justice Documentary for The Fire That Took Her

=== CableACE Awards ===
- 1988: Educational or Instructional Special for How to Raise a Streetsmart Child
- 1989: Documentary Series for America Undercover
- 1994: Documentary Special for America Undercover - The Broadcast Tapes of Dr. Peter
- 1995: Documentary Special for America Undercover - Gang War: Bangin' In Little Rock
- 1995: Children's Special - 7 and Older for Eagle Scout: The Story of Henry Nicols
- 1995: Educational or Instructional Special or Series for America Undercover - Southern Justice: The Murder of Medgar Evers
- 1997: Documentary Special for Heart of a Child
- 1997: Historical Documentary Special or Series for Wonderland

== Selected filmography ==
- 1981: She's Nobody's Baby: The History of American Women in the 20th Century – HBO and Ms. magazine
- 1983–1985: Braingames – creator, executive producer
- 1991–2005: America Undercover – executive producer
- 1995: Taxicab Confessions – executive producer
- 1995: One Survivor Remembers – senior producer
- 1996: The Celluloid Closet – executive producer
- 1996: Paradise Lost: The Child Murders at Robin Hood Hills – executive producer
- 1997: 4 Little Girls – executive producer
- 1997: Breathing Lessons: The Life and Work of Mark O'Brien – executive producer
- 1998: Life of Crime – executive producer
- 2000: Children in War – executive producer
- 2002: Murder on a Sunday Morning – executive producer
- 2002: Spellbound – executive producer
- 2003: Capturing the Friedmans – executive producer
- 2004: Elaine Stritch at Liberty – executive producer
- 2004: Metallica: Some Kind of Monster – executive producer
- 2005: Born into Brothels – executive producer
- 2005: Dope Sick Love – executive producer
- 2006: I Have Tourette's but Tourette's Doesn't Have Me – executive producer
- 2006: When the Levees Broke: A Requiem in Four Acts – executive producer
- 2006: Baghdad ER – executive producer
- 2006: All Aboard! Rosie's Family Cruise – executive producer
- 2008: Alive Day Memories: Home from Iraq – executive producer
- 2008: White Light/Black Rain: The Destruction of Hiroshima and Nagasaki – executive producer
- 2009: The Alzheimer's Project – executive producer
- 2012: Marina Abramović: The Artist Is Present – executive producer
- 2013: Manhunt: The Inside Story of the Hunt for Bin Laden – executive producer
- 2013: Mea Maxima Culpa: Silence in the House of God – executive producer
- 2014: Life According to Sam – executive producer
- 2014: Citizenfour – executive producer
- 2015: Going Clear: Scientology and the Prison of Belief – executive producer
- 2016: A Girl in the River: The Price of Forgiveness – executive producer
- 2016: Jim: The James Foley Story – executive producer
- 2018: The Zen Diaries of Garry Shandling – executive producer

== Works and publications ==
- Nevins, Sheila (foreword by) (2007). Hoffman, John; Froemke, Susan (eds.). Addiction: Why Can't They Just Stop?: New Knowledge, New Treatments, New Hope. New York: Rodale, Inc. ISBN 978-1-609-61697-7. OCLC 894934005.
- Nevins, Sheila (2017). You Don't Look Your Age... and Other Fairy Tales. New York: Flatiron Books. ISBN 978-1-250-11132-6. OCLC 1033473012.
