= Bedlam (2019 film) =

2020 film

BEDLAM
- Directed by: Kenneth Paul Rosenberg
- Written by: Peter Miller; Kenneth Paul Rosenberg
- Produced by: Peter Miller; Kenneth Paul Rosenberg
- Narrated by: Kenneth Paul Rosenberg
- Cinematography: Joan Churchill; Bob Richman; Buddy Squires
- Edited by: Jim Cricchi; James Holland (add)
- Music by: Danny Bensi; Saunder Jurriaans
- Production companies: Upper East Films; ITVS
- Distributed by: Roco Films
- Release date: January 28, 2019 (Sundance)
- Running time: 86 minutes
- Country: United States
- Language: English

Bedlam is a 2019 American feature-length documentary directed, produced, and written by Kenneth Paul Rosenberg. Produced, and written by Peter Miller, co-produced by Joan Churchill and Alan Barker, edited by Jim Cricchi, with additional editing by James Holland, it immerses us in the national crisis surrounding care of people with serious mental illness through intimate stories of patients, families, and medical providers.

Filmed over five years, Bedlam examines psychiatric emergency rooms, jails housing people with mental illness, and the homes and homeless encampments of individuals affected by serious mental illness. The film is partly narrated by director Kenneth Paul Rosenberg, MD, a psychiatrist and a filmmaker, whose life has been affected by a family member with a serious mental illness.

The film premiered at the 2019 Sundance Film Festival.

== Synopsis ==
To shed light on the mental health crisis in the United States and possible solutions, psychiatrist and documentarian Kenneth Paul Rosenberg, MD chronicles the personal stories of people with serious mental illness, including his own family. Shot over the course of five years, Bedlam takes viewers inside the LAC+USC Medical Center's overwhelmed and vastly under-resourced psych ER, a nearby jail warehousing thousands of psychiatric patients, and the homes and encampments of people affected by serious mental illness, where silence and shame often worsen the suffering.

The film follows the lives of three patients in particular who find themselves with a chronic lack of institutional support, while weaving in Rosenberg's own story of how the system failed his late sister, Merle, and her battle with schizophrenia. Featuring interviews with experts, activists, individuals living with a mental illness, and their families, Bedlam builds on historical footage and commentary related to mental health, exploring the rise of this issue on a national scale in the mid- and late-20th century. The film includes the story of Patrisse Cullors and her brother Monte. During the course of filming, Patrisse co-founded Black Lives Matter as well as other advocacy organizations, based on her witnessing her brother's battle with serious mental illness, repeated arrests and incarceration.

== Release ==
Accepted as a rough cut, Bedlam was an official selection of the Sundance Film Festival 2019 documentary competition. After Sundance, in 2019, the film's team spent 12 months to re-edit Bedlam for commercial release and added new scenes, including a groundbreaking cancellation of a proposed "mental health jail" in Los Angeles, the result of a community movement led by the film's subject Patrisse Cullors, during the months after the film's 2019 Sundance Film Festival screening. The theatrical film premiered at the Pan African Film Festival on 15 February 2020. The film was also shown at DOC NYC, Double Exposure Film Festival, Hot Springs Documentary Film Festival, Nashville Film Festival, and others film festivals. In March 2020, nearly 100 single screenings and a theatrical release were cancelled because of the COVID-19 crisis. On 13 April 2020, Bedlam was broadcast on PBS's Independent Lens. On the morning before the broadcast, the Los Angeles Times Editorial Board urged viewers to watch the film, comparing it to other landmark films about America's mental health system. Since broadcast, Bedlam has been shown free-of-charge to communities across America on PBS.org.

== Reception ==
Bedlam has been acclaimed by critics. As of October 2021, the film holds a 100% approval rating on Rotten Tomatoes, based on 10 reviews with an average score of 8.2/10. Sheri Linden at The Hollywood Reporter said the film is "a haunting and trenchant look at failed public policy." The film was called "a stick of dynamite thrown into the dark and troubled history of mental health care for those with serious mental illness" by Lloyd Sederer, MD in Psychology Today. At RogerEbert.com, Brian Tallerico said Bedlam was "partially a wake-up call and partially a somber reminder of how much we've failed people over the last century." It's "required viewing by all Americans" according to Sezin Koehler at Black Girl Nerds. Bedlam has been used by advocates for mental health and criminal justice reform in Los Angeles, including Vote Yes on R, BLD PWR, and the Los Angeles Department of Mental Health. Nationally, the film has been screened by the American Psychiatric Association, the Kennedy Forum, MacArthur Foundation Safety and Justice Challenge, the National Alliance on Mental Illness, Peg's Foundation, Treatment Advocacy Center, Vera Institute of Justice, and other organizations to raise awareness of mental health issues and advance national reforms.

== Book ==
In October 2019, Penguin Random House published BEDLAM: An Intimate Journey into America's Mental Health Crisis, a book that expanded on the themes in the film, Bedlam, and offered concrete solutions, written by Kenneth Paul Rosenberg, MD with Jessica DuLong. The book featured interviews with experts including Elyn Saks, Law Professor at the University of Southern California School of Law and a person with schizophrenia and Norman Ornstein and Judith L. Harris, whose son died during his bout with serious mental illness. Upon book release, the Los Angeles Times published Dr. Rosenberg's op-ed entitled "Mental Illness was my family's secret - and America's great shame." The book was recommended by Norman Ornstein. Peter D. Kramer, MD, called it "the definitive book on serious mental illness" and Allen Frances, MD, wrote that the book "describes this American nightmare with the stark vividness of painful first-hand experiences - as brother, as psychiatrist and visionary documentary filmmaker who explains how we got into this barbaric mess and suggests common sense, cost-effective ways to regain our societal sanity."
