= The Greatest Silence: Rape in the Congo =

- Directed by: Lisa F. Jackson
- Written by: Lisa F. Jackson
- Produced by: Associate Producer - Alexandra Lescaze
- Edited by: Lisa Shreve
- Distributed by: Women Make Movies
- Release date: March 2007 (Amnesty International Film Festival)
- Running time: 76 minutes
- Country: United States
- Languages: English; French; Regional dialects

The Greatest Silence: Rape in the Congo is a 2007 documentary film directed by Lisa F. Jackson concerned with survivors of rape in the regions affected by ongoing conflicts stemming from the Second Congo War. Central to the film are moving interviews with the survivors themselves, as well as interviews with self-confessed rapist soldiers. The Greatest Silence was nominated for a Grand Jury Prize and won a Special Jury Prize at the 2008 Sundance Film Festival. It was also nominated for two News & Documentary Emmy Awards in 2009. It aired on HBO in January & February 2009.

== Synopsis ==
In 2006, producer/director Lisa F. Jackson travelled alone to the war zones of the Democratic Republic of the Congo documenting the plight of women and girls impacted by the conflicts there. She was "afforded privileged access" to the realities of life in Congo, and found "examples of resiliency, resistance, courage and grace". In a 2008 interview with NPR, Jackson said "I knew going to eastern Congo as a white woman alone in the bush with a video camera that I might as well have landed from a spaceship."

Jackson had been a victim of gang rape thirty years earlier, and shared this experience with the survivors she interviewed. Much of the film features these women recounting their stories, which have left them "traumatised and isolated - shunned by society and their families, and suffering life-long health effects, including HIV." Context and background are discussed in interviews with doctors, politicians, peacekeepers, activists and priests. Jackson visits a clinic devoted to treating women with traumatic injury due to sexual violence, particularly cases of vesicovaginal and rectovaginal fistula.

In addition, Jackson went out into the bush to interview some of the perpetrators, soldiers who spoke without apparent conscience about the women they had raped, and their often bizarre justifications. "You really can say that there's a culture of impunity in the Congo, where none of these men will face arrest for what they've confessed to me on videotape," Jackson noted. The focus of the film, though, is the stories of the victims, "who just poured their hearts out to me with these stories, including over and over again, please take these stories to someone who will make a difference."

== Critical reception ==
The Greatest Silence has been lauded by critics and won or been nominated for several awards. James Greenberg in The Hollywood Reporter called it a "documentary of the highest calling," and the Salt Lake Tribune said "Through her unwavering look at the horrific stories of the humiliation and physical mutilation of individual women, Jackson deftly documents rape as a tool in war."

== Awards ==
- 2008 Sundance Film Festival Winner, Special Jury Prize: Documentary
- Gracie Award, Outstanding Documentary - Long Form
- London Human Rights Watch Film Festival, Best of Fest
- Rome Independent Film Festival, Best Documentary

== See also ==
- Sexual violence in the Democratic Republic of the Congo
- Second Congo War
- Kivu conflict
