= Gang War: Bangin' In Little Rock =

- DVD cover
- Directed by: Marc Levin
- Distributed by: HBO Entertainment
- Release date: 1994
- Country: United States
- Language: English

Gang War: Bangin' in Little Rock often referred to as Gang Bangin' in Little Rock is a 1994 HBO documentary about street gangs in Little Rock, Arkansas. It was released as part of the series America Undercover.

== Synopsis ==
The documentary painted a hopeless and pessimistic view of the violence in the city. At the time Little Rock was one of the most dangerous cities in the country. Sitting at the intersection of two major interstates from Los Angeles and New York, Little Rock had become a haven for drug trafficking. There were prominent gang presences of Bloods, Crips and Hoover's Folk Nation.

== Post release ==
The documentary brought much attention to the crime problems in Little Rock. Following documentary, the Little Rock Police force was quadrupled. As a result, the street gang problem was nearly eradicated.

Steve Nawojczyk was the county coroner during the Gang War years, and was featured in the documentary. He continues to work in the intervention and prevention of youth gangs. While Gang War: Bangin' in Little Rock followed Nawojczyk while he did his grim work as the county's chief coroner, it also showed his attempts at reducing the record-high homicide rate in Arkansas' capital city.

=== Back in the Hood: Gang War 2 (2004) ===
There was a follow-up documentary released in 2004 called Back in the Hood: Gang War 2.
