= Educating Peter =

1992 film

- Directed by: Gerardine Wurzburg
- Produced by: Thomas C. Goodwin; Gerardine Wurzburg; Sheila Nevins
- Starring: Judy Gwazdauskas; Peter Gwazdauskas
- Cinematography: Gary Griffin
- Edited by: Grady Watts; Ilana Bittner
- Music by: Richard Einhorn
- Production companies: State of the Art, Inc.
- Distributed by: HBO (TV); Direct Cinema Limited (educational)
- Release date: December 15, 1992
- Running time: 30 minutes
- Country: United States
- Language: English

Educating Peter is a 1992 American short documentary film directed by Gerardine Wurzburg about Peter Gwazdauskas, a special needs student with Down syndrome, and his inclusion in a standard third grade classroom in Blacksburg, Virginia. It won an Oscar at the 65th Academy Awards in 1993 for Documentary Short Subject.

== Overview ==
Peter Gwazdauskas, a third-grade boy with Down syndrome, is attending a traditional school with typically developing students for the first time. Previously, he was enrolled in a school exclusively for students with disabilities. His transition is based on federal law, which requires that students with disabilities be educated alongside their peers in traditional schools.

At first, Peter struggles. During the first half of the school year, he displays challenging behaviors such as making loud noises, rolling on the floor, and occasionally acting aggressively toward classmates. However, by January, his behavior begins to improve significantly. By the end of the school year, he is doing well.

Recognizing his progress, the school awards Peter an "Exceptional Student" award on the last day of school, celebrating his achievements along with his classmates.

== Cast ==
- Judy Gwazdauskas as Herself (Peter's Mother)
- Frank Gwazdauskas as Himself (Peter's Father)
- Peter Gwazdauskas as Himself
- Mrs. Martha Ann Stallings (Peter's Teacher) and her class.
- Mrs. Colley (Special Education Teacher)

== Sequel ==
Graduating Peter was released in 2001. The sequel follows Peter in middle school, high school, and his high school graduation.
