= Taxicab Confessions =

American TV series (1995–2006)

- Genre: Reality
- Directed by: Harry Gantz; Joe Gantz
- Country of origin: United States
- No. of seasons: 11
- No. of episodes: 19

Production
- Executive producer: Sheila Nevins
- Producers: Harry Gantz; Joe Gantz; John Hoffman
- Production locations: Las Vegas; New York City
- Cinematography: Mitchell Wagenberg; Joe Gantz
- Editor: Aaron I. Butler

Original release
- Network: HBO
- Release: January 1995 – 2006

Taxicab Confessions is a television series of hidden camera documentaries that aired on HBO from 1995 through 2006.

When passengers enter the cab, they are recorded with several small cameras hidden in the taxi. The producer prompts passengers into discussing their past and/or present circumstances. This has led some participants to reflect on their life, recalling extreme tragedies or triumphs. Much is verbally or visually graphic, including explicit sex talk and sex acts performed in the back seat. At the end of the taxi ride, passengers are asked to sign waivers allowing the hidden camera footage to be used on the program, and footage of this revelation is sometimes seen during the closing credits.

The series theme song for the New York episodes was "Everybody Hurts" and for the Las Vegas episodes changed to a cover version of "Over the Rainbow" by Me First and the Gimme Gimmes.

The series originated in New York, moved to Las Vegas, and then returned to New York.

== Awards and nominations ==
The series is an Emmy Award winner.

The series won the Primetime Emmy Award for Outstanding Hosted Nonfiction Series or Special in 1995. The show was also nominated for the Primetime Emmy Award for Outstanding Reality Program in 2001 and 2002.

== See also ==
- Cash Cab, a game show set in a taxi
