= Graduating Peter =

2001 television film by Gerardine Wurzburg

- Directed by: Gerardine Wurzburg; Grady Watts
- Produced by: Gerardine Wurzburg; Sheila Nevins
- Starring: Judy Gwazdauskas; Peter Gwazdauskas
- Cinematography: Gary Griffin
- Edited by: Barbara Ballow
- Music by: Geoff Muldaur
- Distributed by: State of the Art, Inc.
- Release date: November 24, 2001
- Running time: 75 minutes
- Country: United States
- Language: English

Graduating Peter is a 2001 American documentary film directed by Gerardine Wurzburg. This is a sequel to the 1992 Academy Award-winning short documentary film Educating Peter; where it follows the continuing adventures of Peter Gwazdauskas, a special needs student with Down syndrome, in his middle school and high school life as well as his high school graduation. The documentary was filmed in Blacksburg, Virginia.

== Cast ==
- Peter Gwazdauskas as himself
- Judy Gwazdauskas as herself (Peter's Mother)
- Frank Gwazdauskas as himself (Peter's Father)
- Jennifer Gwazdauskas as herself (Peter's Sister)

== Synopsis ==
Before he entered the third grade, Peter Gwazdauskas was originally in a separate school for students with disabilities. When he entered the third grade, he enrolled in a traditional school due to a change in federal law stating that students with disabilities should be educated with typically developing students in general education. Even though Peter had improved since third grade, he still had some challenges, including depression and occasional behavioral outbursts. During the school day, Peter was accompanied by paraprofessionals to help him stay directed and learning. Sometimes during class, he was pulled out of the lesson in order to work with a paraprofessional in a one-on-one setting. To increase his social skills, Peter had some community-based jobs during the time he was in middle school and high school. In the summer, he had a summer aide in order to continue his functional education, learning vocational skills and community-based living practices. Peter also participated in extracurricular activities at his school, like being in the concert band as well as being the manager of the soccer team. He was also in a school club with both typically developing peers and peers with disabilities. Since joining, it has helped Peter improve his social skills. He improved even more in social and vocational skills by the end of his senior year of high school and went on to graduate with his classmates.

== Trivia ==
A clip of the Barney & Friends episode "Safety First!" is seen in the documentary when Peter and his summer aide are watching it on their TV.

A scene of the documentary was filmed on location at Busch Gardens Williamsburg when Peter was on a club trip for his school.

Another scene was also filmed on location at Virginia Tech when Peter worked in the bookstore.
