= Lisa F. Jackson =

American documentary filmmaker

Lisa F. Jackson (born 1950) is an American documentary filmmaker, known most recently for her films, The Greatest Silence: Rape in the Congo (2007) and Sex Crimes Unit (2011), which aired on HBO in 2008 and 2011. Her work has earned awards including two Emmy awards and a Jury Prize from the Sundance Film Festival. She has screened her work and lectured at the Columbia University School of Journalism, Brandeis, Purdue, NYU, Yale, Notre Dame and Harvard University and was a visiting professor of documentary film at the School of Visual Arts in Manhattan.

== Early life and career ==
Lisa (Elisabeth) Finch Jackson was born in San Francisco, California in 1950, the daughter of Nancy Abrams and Morton B. Jackson. When she was young, both her father and stepfather, Donald Carmichael, were in the CIA, and as a result she moved often, living in Bangkok, Thailand and in Bogotá, Colombia before settling in Washington, D.C. in 1963.

Jackson studied filmmaking at MIT with famed documentarian Richard Leacock. In 1972 she moved back to Washington DC, working first as a location sound recordist, then as a film and videotape editor on such films as Reflections on a Revolution for Bill Moyers' Journal, The Unquiet Death of Julius and Ethel Rosenberg for PBS and, working with filmmaker Charles Guggenheim, TV campaign spots for Senators Frank Church, Fritz Hollings and Ted Kennedy.

She has directed and/or edited dozens of films for PBS, including Voices and Visions: Emily Dickinson, Jackson Pollock: Portrait, Through Madness (a 1993 NYC Emmy winner), The Creative Spirit, Storytellers, The Sixth Van Cliburn International Piano Competition, Bill Moyers' Journal, The Mind, and segments for Sesame Street and Live from Lincoln Center.

Jackson's credits as a producer/director include Meeting with a Killer: One Family’s Journey (2001, Court TV; 2001 Emmy Award nominee), Life Afterlife (1999, HBO), The Secret Life of Barbie (1998, ABC; 1999 Emmy Award winner), Why Am I Gay? (1993) and Addicted (1997) for HBO's America Undercover series, Smart Sex (1994) and No Money, Mo' Problems (1998) for the MTV series True Life, The Other Epidemic (1993, ABC), Firefighters (1997, The Learning Channel), A Passion to Play (1997, ABC Sports), five episodes of the Hallmark Channel's acclaimed Adoption series (2001–2003), including stories shot in Siberia and Guatemala; and two seasons of the hit series Psychic Detectives (2002–2005, Court TV). Jackson has also produced public service announcements for the US Justice Department's Office for Victims of Crime and a short film to support UN Women's work in the Ivory Coast and she spent three years shooting Tres Mujeres ('Three Women'), a documentary short about a group of displaced women living in the slums of Bogotá, Colombia.

In 2012 she shot and co-directed (with Sarah Teale) the feature length doc Grazers. The film follows the efforts of farmers in upstate New York as they struggle to find a market for their grass-fed beef and come up against the realities of Big Agriculture. It premiered at DOCNYC in 2014, is distributed by Collective Eye. A short version can be found on YouTube.

In 2013 she co-directed an OpDoc for the New York Times called Sex Offender Village, which she also shot and edited.

Jackson moved from New York City to Mexico in 2015 in order to continue filming on PATRIMONIO and now lives full time in Todos Santos, Baja California Sur.

== Patrimonio ==
In 2014 Jackson travelled to Baja California Sur, Mexico, and began to film a documentary that became Patrimonio, co-produced with Sarah Teale. Shot over the course of three years, Patrimonio is a story of inspired activism, a verite portrait of a community rallying to protect its natural resources as an unlikely group of fishermen takes on a multi-national giant, challenging their own government, denouncing corruption and demanding justice. Variety said of Patrimonio that it “feels like a frightening portent… thoroughly engrossing.” The film had its world premiere at the 2018 Berlin Film Festival and was also screened at DocNYC, The San Francisco Green Film Festival (winner, Audience Award), and the SHAHR International Film Festival in Iran. Its Mexico premiere was covered in a lengthy article in Proceso. In 2019 she produced a Study Guide for the film. Patrimonio is distributed by First Run Features.

== The Greatest Silence ==
For her documentary The Greatest Silence: Rape in the Congo, Jackson filmed in the war zones of the Democratic Republic of the Congo. The Greatest Silence won a Special Jury Prize for Documentaries at the 2008 Sundance Film Festival, earned two Emmy nominations and was seen on HBO in 2009. The film has received notices and articles in The New York Times, Human Rights Quarterly, and Ms.. The feature-length film provides an intimate look into the horror - and grace - of the lives of women and girls who have survived sexual violence in this war-torn region.

== Sex Crimes Unit ==
Jackson’s 2011 documentary, Sex Crimes Unit, offers a look inside the New York District Attorney’s office at the preeminent unit in the U.S. dedicated to the prosecution of rape and sexual assault. The film follows members of the unit through their investigations, including the case of a prostitute who is a victim of rape and a woman whose case was literally almost thrown away. It aired on HBO in 2011 to positive reviews.

== It Happened Here ==
2014 saw the release of Jackson's documentary about sexual assault on campus, It Happened Here, which debuted on the Pivot network on January 21. Beginning in February 2014, the film was screened on several college campuses as part of the It's On Us campaign launched in 2013 by President Barack Obama and the White House Council on Women and Girls to raise awareness and fight against sexual assault on college campuses for both men and women. The film "explores sexual assault on campuses through the personal testimonials of five survivors who transform their experiences into a springboard for change. It Happened Here includes the personal portraits of five students at three schools along with testimonials from college administrators, educators, mental health experts and legal scholars".

== Critical reception ==
Tom Shales of the Washington Post has praised Lisa F. Jackson’s documentaries as “superb” and “outstanding”. John O’Connor commented in the New York Times that “producer/director Lisa F. Jackson is remarkably adept in getting her subjects to speak frankly and thoughtfully.” The Christian Science Monitor noted that she takes on difficult subjects “with intelligence and courage.”

John Anderson of Variety wrote, “Helmer Lisa F. Jackson's Sex Crimes Unit is the real thing, a gritty, emotional, up-close-and-procedural look at the actual New York district attorneys dedicated to prosecuting rape and sexual assault... Sex Crimes Unit has drama, suspense, terrific personalities and a great deal of heart. The attorneys are portrayed as basic, funny, human people who just happen to be devoted to a job not many people could do, or would want to do.”

Michael Cieply at NYTimes.com wrote that ‘Sex Crimes Unit’ “is an overall primer on the crime of rape and the extreme difficulty involved with its prosecution... takes a close look at a mostly female group of prosecutors and assistants who clearly take visceral joy in their victories.”

== Awards and honors ==
- In May 2022 Jackson received the first-ever Legacy Award bestowed by the Rocky Mountain Women's Film Festival in acknowledgement of her long career and the five films she has presented at the festival, "stories that have informed, challenged and educated our audiences."
- 2012 Muse Award from New York Women in Film & Television
- Emmy nominations for Writing/Outstanding Special, 2009
- iWitness Award, Jewish World Watch, 2009
- Sundance Jury Prize/Documentary, 2008
- Emmy Award for Outstanding Informational Special, 1999
- New York City Emmy for Outstanding Informational Special, 1993 (for Through Madness)
- Woman of Courage Award, UCSF, 2009
- Emmy nomination for Outstanding Informational Special, 2001
- Three CINE Golden Eagles, 1980, 1999, 2004
- Best Documentary Awards from the Rome Independent Film Festival, 2008 and International Black DocuFest, 2009
- Audience Choice Awards from the London HRWFF (2008), One World Slovakia (2008), Vancouver (2008), Breckenridge (2000) and Cinequest (2000) film festivals
- Gracie Award from AWRT, 2009
- Four Houston International Film Festival Gold Awards
- Silver Chris Award from the Columbus International Film Festival, 2000
- Two Gold Clarion Awards from Women in Communications, 1995
- Movies That Matter Award from Amnesty International, 2008
- Special Jury Award, Hemisfilm International Film Festival
- Margaret Sanger "Maggie" Award, PPFA, Best Documentary of the Year, 1995
- 2 Gold "Cindy" Awards, Information Film Producers of America
