= Bonnie Strauss =

Bonnie Strauss is an American broadcast journalist and documentary filmmaker.

== Early life ==
Strauss was born Bonnie J. Hudson, 1942–43, in Michigan, the daughter of Lee and Russian-born father Sidney Hudson. She was primarily raised in Los Angeles, CA. where, in 1950, her father was the owner of a cleaning establishment. In 1962 she married Benjamin Strauss, chairman of the national auto-supply company Pep Boys and the son of Maurice Strauss, one of its founders. They had two children—Victoria and Evan—and divorced in the 1980s.

== Career ==
Her career began in Philadelphia in 1973 when she was asked by Marciarose Shestack, the host of NBC’s Noon News to be a guest on her show. A self-taught cook who later trained at Le Cordon Bleu and working for Chef Paul Boucouse, Strauss was asked to share recipes on-air. After regular appearances on Shestack's show and the Edie Huggins Morning Show on WCAU TV (CBS Affiliate), Strauss put away her apron and began studying journalism.

In 1975, Strauss began doing consumer reports broadcasts on WCAU radio, where she became in 1976 as the news anchor for the WCAU Radio Overnight Weekend News.

In 1978, Strauss began reporting at WPVI-TV (an ABC affiliate) in Philadelphia. Her first investigative series, Behind Locked Doors, a multi-part examination of patient abuse at Pennhurst State School, received a Special Recognition Award for Investigative Journalism from the Associated Press in 1979. Strauss’s work contributed to new legislation in Pennsylvania that made it illegal to keep mental patients “locked up” in their rooms.

In 1979, Strauss moved back to Los Angeles and worked as a general assignment reporter for KNXT TV, currently known as KCBS-TV. Strauss won an Emmy in 1981 for her Breaking News coverage of the kidnapping and murder of Ronnie Tolleson, a 10-year-old from West Covina, California. Her six-month investigation into police brutality in Signal Hill, California, resulted in her winning the coveted Alfred I. duPont Award in journalism for KNXT in 1982, as well as the Radio and TV News Director's First Place Western Region Award for Best Continuing Coverage of a story. The series led to dramatic changes in the Signal Hill Police Department.

Strauss became co-host and reporter of the nationally syndicated television and Emmy award-winning show Hour Magazine in 1983 where she worked for three years. She joined ABC's Good Morning America in 1986 as a contributing correspondent.

Also in 1986, Strauss co-directed and produced her first documentary, The Women of Papua New Guinea: Yesterday, Today, and Tomorrow which explored women and tribal customs in Papua New Guinea. It won a CINE Golden Eagle Award in 1987.

Strauss became a correspondent for ABC's National News Division in 1987, reporting for both World News Tonight and Nightline with Ted Koppel. In 1990, Av Westin, the head of 20/20 left ABC News and offered Strauss a job reporting on a revamped Inside Edition. Strauss explored stories in Russia, where she reported on the Russian mafia, in Cuba, where she did a hidden camera report on child prostitution, and Los Angeles, covering the South Central Riots.

In 2001, Strauss co-produced and directed Dwarfs, not a Fairy Tale which was shown on HBO and was nominated for an Emmy for Outstanding Non-Fiction Primetime Special.

Concerned about the conditions of the working poor in America, Strauss produced and directed in 2004 No Place Like Home, a documentary for MSNBC which received a Casey Medal for Meritorious Journalism, as well as a Front Page Award from the Newswomen's Club of New York.

In 2005, Strauss produced Rikers High, a documentary which explored how poverty impacted incarcerated youths at Rikers Island in New York. It also focused on the dedicated teachers working to rescue affected children before they returned to the streets. It won the New York Loves Film Best Documentary Feature Award at the 2005 Tribeca Film Festival.

In 2012, Strauss was named a Beatrice Stern Media Award Honoree by the Didi Hirsch Mental Health Services organization.

Strauss is married to Dr. Roger Gould a psychiatrist and author and has two children. Victoria, her daughter with former husband, Benjamin Strauss, is married to Matthew Maxwell Kennedy, son of Robert and Ethel Kennedy. Bonnie Strauss currently has five grandchildren.
