= Tami Gold =

American film director

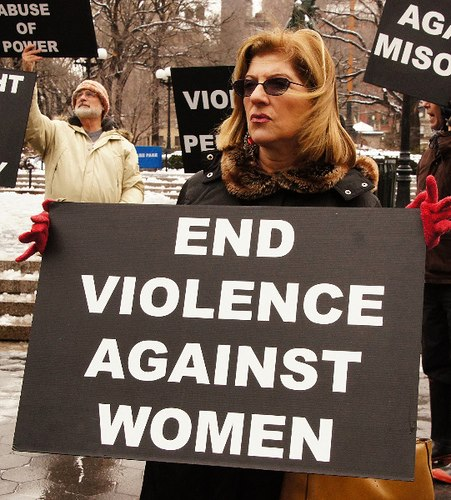
- Awards: Guggenheim Fellowship

Tami Kashia Gold is a documentary filmmaker, visual artist and educator. She is also a professor at Hunter College of the City University of New York in the Department of Film and Media Studies.

== Biography ==
As a teenager, Gold studied in Mexico and Cuba where she was first introduced to the documentary filmmaking of Santiago Álvarez who had a major influence on her work.

In 1970 she began working with the New York-based Newsreel Film Collective (currently Third World Newsreel). While in the Newsreel collective, Gold produced and directed (with Heather Archibald) My Country Occupied in 1971, a docu-drama about the life of a Guatemalan woman. My County Occupied won First Place winner in the Leipzig Film Festival and was featured at the Whitney Museum and the Museum of Modern Art.

Gold directed and produced various documentaries, including Juggling Gender: Politics, Sex and Identity about Jennifer Miller, which premiered at the New York Film Festival's video series and was broadcast on public television stations; Out at Work: Lesbians and Gay men on the Job, which screened at the Sundance Film Festival and was shown on HBO and authored a companion article, Making Out at Work; Another Brother, the story of an African American Vietnam Veteran; Signed Sealed and Delivered, Labor Struggle in the Post Office, which aired on PBS, and Looking for Love: Teenage Mothers, among others.

In 1996 she formed the production company AndersonGold films, Inc. with Kelly Anderson.

In 2000, Gold produced and directed Making a Killing (with Kelly Anderson), a documentary on the marketing practices of the tobacco industry in the developing world. Making a Killing premiered at the Slamdance Film Festival, was screened for delegates at the World Health Organization and aired on television in Nigeria, Serbia, Lagos and Vietnam.

In 2004, Gold produced and directed Every Mother's Son (with Kelly Anderson), which won the Tribeca Film Festival Audience Award and was broadcast on the PBS series P.O.V.. In 2006, Gold produced and directed a video about the popular struggle in Oaxaca, Mexico, Land Rain and Fire (with Gerardo Renique), which aired internationally on Spanish-language TV. She authored a companion article, A Rainbow in the Midst of a Hurricane (Radical Teacher 2008).

In 2010 she directed (with Larry Shore, Producer/Director) RFK in the Land of Apartheid: A Ripple of Hope, a documentary about Robert F. Kennedy's visit to South Africa in 1966 and the connection between the anti-apartheid struggle and the Civil Rights Movement in the United States. In 2011, she produced Passionate Politics about the life and work of feminist activist Charlotte Bunch.

Gold is also a visual artist whose work has been presented at galleries such as the Tabla Rasa Gallery in Brooklyn, New York, Exposico-na-Gravura, Brasileira, Brazil and her work is part of a print collection at the Pinacoteca do Estado Museum in São Paulo. Gold's artwork has also been featured in the Living Arts section of The New York Times. She is a member of the SONYA arts group in Brooklyn and the New Day Films coop. She is also a contributing writer for THINK/POINT/SHOOT: Media Ethics from Development to Distribution.

She has four daughters and five grandchildren.

== Awards and recognitions ==
Gold is the recipient of a Rockefeller Fellowship, Guggenheim Fellowship, Video Arts Fellowships from the New Jersey and New York State Councils on the Arts, the Excellence in the Arts Award from the Manhattan Borough President, and the American Film Institute's Independent Filmmakers Production Fellowship. Her work has screened at the Museum of Modern Art, the Whitney Museum, The Chicago Arts Institute, The Kennedy Center, The American Film Institute, The British Film Institute and The Public Theater among others. Gold is a professor at Hunter College and the Hunter Chapter Chair of the PSC CUNY.

== Filmography ==
- PUZZLES When Hate Came to Town (2014) Produced and directed with David Pavlosky;- Through telling the story of a violent hate crime in an LGBT bar PUZZLES explores the connections between joblessness, homophobia, intolerance, and, ultimately, violence.
- Passionate Politics: The Life & Work of Charlotte Bunch (2011) Producer, Director – This film tells the story of Charlotte Bunch - an internationally recognized human rights activist whose journey began as a young Methodist teenager from a small town in New Mexico. The film follows Charlotte's life as she develops into a lesbian feminist committed to social justice and covers forty years of her life as a pioneering strategist and organizer for women's rights throughout the world.
- Rfk in the Land of Apartheid (2010) Director (with Larry Shore) – A documentary about Robert Kennedy's visit to South Africa the apartheid regime. It played at the Brooklyn Academy of Music, The International Vermont Film festival and the Robert Kennedy Library.
- Oaxacan Trilogy (2008) Producer, Director (with Gerardo Renique and Mal de Ojo) - This includes three pieces about the popular movement in Oaxaca: Land Rain & Fire: Report from Oaxaca and the new documentaries El Golpe and Coro. El Golpe and Coro were completed in 2007 and broadcast over the Hispanic International Network Television and opened the XXXII Simposio de Historia Y Antropología de Sonora, Mexico.
- NYPD Blues (2007) Producer, Director and Cameraperson - This is a companion 16-minute documentary that creatively enlarges the discussion begun with Every Mother's Son around policing and police reform by bringing the voices of the police directly into the conversation.
- Every Mother's Son (2004) Producer, Director (with Kelly Anderson), Cameraperson - In the late 1990s, three victims of police brutality made headlines around the country: Amadou Diallo, the young West African man whose killing sparked intense public protest; Anthony Baez, killed in an illegal choke-hold, and Gary (Gidone) Busch, a Hasidic Jew shot outside his Brooklyn home. Every Mother's Son profiles three New York mothers who unexpectedly find themselves united to seek justice. National Emmy nomination 2005 for Direction, Audience Choice Award at The Tribeca Film Festival 2004, Cine Golden Eagle Award and National Broadcast Premiere PBS's POV series 2004.
- Making a Killing (2001) Producer, Director (with Kelly Anderson), Cameraperson - A documentary about the tobacco giant Philip Morris and their efforts to build their customer base by targeting children throughout the world. The film documents the corporation's aggressive advertising tactics in Eastern Europe and Asia. Presented at the Slamdance Film Festival 2001, Academy of Motion Pictures Arts and Sciences Outstanding Documentaries of the Year Film Series—Los Angeles Lost Film Festival—Philadelphia, Africa Independent Television (AIT)—Lagos, Nigeria, Worldfest Houston International Film Festival—Houston, Texas, Platinum Award-Film & Video Production Documentary, Hanoi TV—Hanoi, Vietnam, TV Novisad—Serbia, Long Island International Film Expo—Malverne, New York, KENW—PBS affiliate, Portales, New Mexico, The Green Reel Film Festival—Los Angeles, Big Bear Lake International Film Festival, Sidewalk Moving Picture Festival—Alabama, KLVX—PBS affiliate, Las Vegas, One World Film Festival—Ottawa, Ontario, Canada, Hawaii International Film Festival, New York International Independent Film and Video Festival, Cinema in Industry Regional Competition—Gold Award, Houston Pan-Cultural Film Festival, 2nd Place Best Documentary, and the Jury Prize-Documentary at the NY International Independent Film and Video Festival.
- Another Brother (1998) Producer and Director - A personal documentary portrait that tells the story of Clarence Fitch's life, from his teenage years as a marine in Vietnam to his subsequent anti-war activism, from his struggle with narcotics addition to his final battle with AIDS. Premiered at the 1998 Urban World Film Festival and winner of a Gold Hugo from the Chicago International Film Festival, a CINE Golden Eagle Award, a Gold World Medal at the New York Festivals International Competition and National PBS Broadcast in celebration of Black History Month.
- Out at Work: America Undercover (1999) Producer, Director (with Kelly Anderson), Cameraperson - A special HBO documentary which explores and exposes job discrimination against lesbians and gay men. Recipient of a CINE Golden Eagle Award and the GLAAD Media Award 2000 for Outstanding Documentary and screened in festivals worldwide.
- Out at Work (1997) Producer, Director, (with Kelly Anderson) Cameraperson - The first-ever documentary about the lives and conflicts of lesbian and gay workers. Presented at the Sundance Film Festival 1997. Golden Apple Award - National Media Network Festival, Chicago International Film Festival-Gold Plaque Award. Recipient of an Independent Producers American Film Institute Fellowship, a New York State Council on the Arts Video Production Grant, a Robeson Grant, a Soros Documentary Grant and a Mid-Atlantic Regional Video Arts Fellowship.
- Emily and Gitta (1996) Director - A love story between two women in their thirties, living in LA, one, a daughter of Holocaust survivors and the other, whose parents were members of the Nazis. American Film Institute - Directing Workshop for Women. Recipient of a CUNY Women's Research Foundation Award, an AFI Grant and a grant from the Astraea Lesbian Foundation for Justice. Premiered at the New York Gay & Lesbian Film Festival, the San Francisco Jewish Film Festival, the Freiburger Lesbenfilmtage, the Lesbian Film Festival of Paris and presented at festivals worldwide.
- Juggling Gender (1992) Producer, Director, Cameraperson and Editor - A documentary portrait of Jennifer Miller, lesbian performer who lives her life with a full beard. Selected for the 1992 New York Film Festival/Video Series, the 1993 Institute of Contemporary Art, England, the British Film Institute, IMAGE Festival winner, the American Film Institute Video Festival and at Gay & Lesbian festivals throughout the United States, Japan, Canada, Mexico, Germany and Australia.
- Prescription for Change (1986) Producer and Director (with Lyn Goldfard) A 30-minute documentary which presents a behind-the-scenes look at nursing. Selected for Independent Focus and aired over other broadcast and cable television stations. Featured at The Black Maria Film and Video Festival, The 1987 Flaherty Documentary Seminar, Women in the Director's Chair, Film in the Cities, The Global Village Documentary Series and The American Film Institute.
- From Bedside to Bargaining Table (1984) Producer and Director (with Lyn Goldfard) A 20-minute documentary on nurses organizing to effect change in health care. Winner of a Blue Ribbon in the American Film Festival; winner at The Athens Video Festival and featured at Women in the Director's Chair and The Global Village Documentary Festival.
- The Last Hunger Strike? (1982) Producer, Director and Editor – This is a 60-minute documentary produced for PBS that explores the human dimensions of the violence that rocked Northern Ireland. Gold Plaque winner in the 19th annual Chicago International Film and Video Festival, Honorable Mention at The American Film and Video Festival. Presented at The Kennedy Center (American Film Institute.)
- Looking for Love: Teenage Parents (1982) Producer, Director, Cameraperson and Editor – This is a 30-minute documentary portraying the complex and contradictory feelings of teenage mothers. It was the winner at The Athens International Film and Video Festival; the National Council on Family Relations; Columbus International Film Festival and Director's Choice at The Black Maria Film and Video Festival. Aired over WNET-TV, WOR-TV, WNYC-TV, Cable television and was selected for the 1989 Learning Channel's Teenage Series. Featured at The 1987 Robert Flaherty Documentary Seminar, The Newark Museum, The Global Village Documentary Series and the Jersey City Museum.
- Signed, Sealed and Delivered (1980) Producer, Director, Cameraperson and Editor (with Eric Lewy and Dan Gordon) This is a 45-minute documentary on postal workers' efforts to win better working conditions. Selected for Independent Focus and a WNET Labor Day Special. Aired over additional PBS and Cable stations, it received a Blue Ribbon in The American Film Festival, First Place in The U.S. Film & Video Festival (Currently Sundance), First Place in The Global Village Video Festival and San Francisco Video Festival.
- My Country Occupied (1971) Producer, Director, Cameraperson and Editor (with Heather Archibald Lewis) This is a B&W 16mm docu-drama on the life of a Guatemalan woman. It was First Place winner in Liepzieg Film Festival and was featured at the Whitney Museum. Included in the Third World Newsreel 60's collection.
- Signal To Noise (1995) Segment Director - TV Families - Part of a three-hour ITVS series for PBS
- Positive: living with HIV (1994) Segment Producer and Director - AIDSFILMS, Inc. and ITVS - four one-hour programs which explore and address the issues, challenges, and experiences of living with HIV. PBS screening January 1996.
- Facing Aids: Stories of Healthcare Workers (1993) Producer, Director and Cameraperson (with Robert Rosenberg) A Bread and Roses Cultural Production Video portraits of healthcare workers as they deal with the AIDS epidemic. Part of the Walter Reed Theatre/Lincoln Center "A Day Without Art" video presentation. Distributed by the National League for Nursing.
- Labor at the Crossroads (1989 - 1997) Producer, Director and Editor - American Social History Project A monthly series (documentaries and talk shows) produced with the Hunter College Department of Communications and the American Social History Project for cable television on diverse topics: The '92 Elections, The Daily News is Bad News, Rap Perspectives, Nicaragua and the Elections, The Mine Workers Strike, Aides in the Workplace, Worker Without a Voice: New Immigrants in NYC.
- Why Women's Funds (1989) Producer and Director (with Bienvenida Matias) National Network of Women's Funds Project A 20-minute documentary which explores the status of women throughout the United States and the need for women's foundations. Distributed by the National Network of Women's Funds.
- Techos y Derechos (Roofs and Rights) (1988) Producer, Director and Cameraperson A Shelterforce Production - A 20-minute Spanish-language videotape on the housing crisis in urban communities and the rights of tenants. Aired over many Spanish-language stations, Deep Dish T.V.
- Not the American Dream (1983) Producer, Director, Cameraperson and Editor – A 30-minute documentary illustrating the housing crisis in suburban America. Aired on WOR-TV, Winner in the 1985 National Housing Festival. Featured at the Museum of Modern Art.

== Non-fiction writings ==
- "A Rainbow in the Midst of a Hurricane: Alternative Media and the Popular Struggle in Oaxaca, Mexico", Radical Teacher, 2008
- Making out at Work], Social Text, 2002
- "Can We Talk? Cuban Media Makers Debate Their Future", The Independent, 1995
- "Media During the 'Special Period' in Cuba" - article for The Tokyo/The Chunichi, 1994
