= The Iceman Confesses =

- Starring: Richard Kuklinski
- Country of origin: United States
- Original language: English

Original release
- Release: 1992
- Release: 2001
- Release: 2003

The Iceman Tapes: Conversations with a Killer, The Iceman Confesses: Secrets of a Mafia Hitman (also known as The Iceman: Confessions of a Mafia Hitman) and The Iceman and the Psychiatrist are three true-crime TV documentaries that feature the serial killer and alleged hitman Richard Kuklinski. They were produced by HBO, directed by Arthur Ginsberg, and released in 1992, 2001 and 2003, respectively, featuring Kuklinski detailing his life and gruesome murders. The last installment also features forensic psychiatrist Park Dietz interviewing and profiling Kuklinski.

== See also ==
- List of films featuring psychopaths and sociopaths
