= Richard Kuklinski =

American criminal (1935–2006)

- Kuklinski in 1982
- Born: Richard Leonard Kuklinski; April 11, 1935; Jersey City, New Jersey, U.S.
- Died: March 5, 2006 (aged 70); Trenton, New Jersey, U.S.
- Other names: The Iceman; Big Rich; Big Richie
- Spouse: Barbara Pedrici Kuklinski (m. 1961; div. 1993)
- Children: 3
- Conviction: Murder (5 counts)
- Penalty: Four consecutive life sentences

Details
- Date apprehended: December 17, 1986
- Height: 6 ft 5 in (196 cm)

Richard Leonard Kuklinski (/kʊˈklɪnski/: April 11, 1935 – March 5, 2006), also known by his nickname the Iceman, was an American criminal and leader of a New Jersey-based burglary ring. He engaged in criminal activities for most of his adult life, which began when he distributed pirated pornography and eventually escalated to at least five murders committed between 1980 and 1984 for personal profit. His nickname derives from his freezing the body of one of his victims in an attempt to disguise the time of death.

At the time of his crimes, Kuklinski lived with his wife and children in the New Jersey suburb of Dumont. His family stated that they were unaware of his crimes. Kuklinski's modus operandi was to lure men to clandestine meetings with the promise of lucrative business deals, then kill them and steal their money. He also killed two associates to prevent them from becoming informants. Eventually, Kuklinski came to the attention of law enforcement when an investigation into his burglary ring linked him to several murders since he was the last person to have seen five missing men alive. An eighteen-month-long undercover operation led to his arrest in December 1986. In 1988, he was convicted of four murders and sentenced to life imprisonment. In 2003, Kuklinski received an additional thirty-year sentence after confessing to the 1980 murder of a New York City police detective.

After his murder convictions, Kuklinski gave interviews to writers, prosecutors, criminologists and psychiatrists. He claimed to have murdered anywhere from 100 to 200 men, often in gruesome fashion. None of these additional murders have been corroborated. In 2020, ATF Special Agent Dominick Polifrone said, "I don't believe he killed 200 people. I don't believe he killed a hundred people. I'll go as high as 15, maybe." Kuklinski also claimed to have worked as a hitman for the Mafia. He further claimed to have had participated in several famous Mafia killings, including the disappearance and presumed murder of Teamsters president Jimmy Hoffa. Law enforcement, former mafiosi and organized crime experts have expressed skepticism about Kuklinski's claimed Mafia ties. He was the subject of three HBO documentaries aired in 1992, 2001 and 2003; several biographies, and a 2012 feature film The Iceman.

== Personal life ==
Richard Kuklinski was born on April 11, 1935, in his family's apartment on 4th Street in Jersey City, New Jersey. His father, Stanley Kuklinski (né Stanisław Kukliński; 1906–1977), was a Polish immigrant from Karwacz, Masovian Voivodeship, who worked as a brakeman on the Delaware, Lackawanna and Western Railroad. His mother, Anna Cecilia McNally (1911–1972), was from Harsimus, a devoutly Catholic first-generation Irish American who worked in a meat-packing plant. Kuklinski was the second of four children.

According to Kuklinski, his father was a violent alcoholic who beat his children regularly and sometimes beat his wife. He abandoned the family while Kuklinski was still a child but came back periodically, usually drunk and his returns were often followed by more beatings for his son. In 1941, beatings by his father caused the death of Kuklinski's older brother, seven-year-old Florian Kuklinski (1933–1941). Kuklinski's parents hid the cause of the child's death from authorities, saying he had fallen down a flight of steps. Kuklinski's younger brother, Joseph Michael Kuklinski (1944–2003), was convicted in 1970 of raping twelve-year-old Pamela Dial and murdering her by throwing her off the top of a five-story building. When asked about his brother's crimes, Kuklinski replied: "We come from the same father."

Kuklinski's mother was also reportedly abusive. She would beat him with broom handles (sometimes breaking the handle on his body during the assaults) and other household objects. He recalled an incident during his pre-teen years when his mother attempted to kill his father with a kitchen knife. As a zealous Catholic, Kuklinski's mother believed that stern discipline should be accompanied by a strict religious upbringing, so he was raised in the Roman Catholic Church and served as an altar boy. Kuklinski later rejected Catholicism and regarded his mother as a "cancer" who destroyed everything she touched.

Kuklinski and his first wife, Linda, had two sons. While working for a trucking company, he met Barbara Pedrici, a secretary at the same firm. Richard and Linda divorced, and he married Barbara in September 1961 and had two daughters and a son.

Kuklinski's family and their neighbors in Dumont, New Jersey, were unaware of his criminal activities and instead believed he was a successful businessman. Barbara described him as a "wholesale distributor" and said he employed an accountant. She did suspect that some of his income was from illegal activities due to their lifestyle and the large amounts of cash he often possessed. However, given his volatility, she never expressed these worries to him, instead maintaining a "don't ask questions" philosophy when it came to his business life or associates. If Kuklinski suddenly left the house in the middle of the night, Barbara would never ask where he was going. On June 6, 1984, Kuklinski filed for personal bankruptcy listing debts of $160,697, and assets of only $300.

The Kuklinskis divorced in 1993 when Richard was in prison. Barbara stated the divorce was for "money reasons." She continued to visit him in prison, but only about once a year.

=== Personality ===
Barbara later described her husband's behavior as alternating between "good Richie" and "bad Richie." "Good Richie" was a hard-working provider and an affectionate father and loving husband, who enjoyed time with his family. Barbara remembered that when Merrick became seriously ill soon after she was born, Richard stayed up night after night to care for her.

In contrast, "bad Richie" – who would appear at irregular intervals, sometimes one day after another, other times not appearing for months – was prone to unpredictable fits of rage, smashing furniture and being violent to his family. During these periods, Kuklinski was physically abusive to his wife, breaking her nose three times and once trying to run her over with his car. His abuse also caused her to have several miscarriages. He was also emotionally abusive towards his children, but according to Barbara, he never laid a hand on them because she threatened to kill him if he did. Merrick reported that Kuklinski once killed her dog in front of her to punish her for coming home late.

Barbara said that she had once told Kuklinski she wanted to see other people. He responded by silently jabbing her from behind with a hunting knife so sharp she did not even feel the blade go in. He told her that she belonged to him and that if she tried to leave, he would kill her entire family. When Barbara began screaming at him in anger, he choked her into unconsciousness. Merrick also remembered a number of road rage incidents involving her father.

== Criminal history ==
=== Early crimes ===
In the mid-1960s, Kuklinski worked at a Manhattan film lab. There, he accessed master copies of popular movies and made bootleg recordings of Disney animated films to sell. Kuklinski also discovered a lucrative market for tapes of pornographic films, making and distributing copies as a regular source of income. Through the pornography business, Kuklinski became associated with members of the Gambino crime family, including soldato (soldier) Roy DeMeo. It was during this period that he was arrested for passing a bad check, the only crime he was charged with prior to his arrest for murder. Kuklinski was photographed and fingerprinted, but the charges were dropped after he agreed to pay back the money owed. Several of his known murder victims were men he met through trafficking pornography and drugs. He also headed a burglary ring with associates Gary Smith, Barbara Deppner, Daniel Deppner and Percy House.

=== George Malliband ===
On January 30, 1980, Kuklinski killed 42-year-old George Malliband during a meeting to sell him tapes. Malliband was reportedly carrying $27,000 at the time. His body was discovered a week later, on February 5, after Kuklinski had placed it in a 55-gallon drum and left it near the Chemitex chemical plant in Jersey City. He cut the tendons of Malliband's leg in order to fit the corpse into the barrel. This was the first murder linked to Kuklinski. Malliband's brother told police officers that Malliband was meeting Kuklinski the day he disappeared. After a plea bargain, Kuklinski admitted to shooting Malliband five times, saying, "It was due to business."

=== Paul Hoffman ===
On April 29, 1982, Kuklinski met Paul Hoffman, a 51-year-old pharmacist who occasionally browsed "the store" in Paterson, New Jersey, a storefront with a back room holding a wide variety of stolen items for sale. Hoffman hoped to make a big profit by purchasing stolen Tagamet, a popular drug to treat peptic ulcers, to resell through his pharmacy. Believing Kuklinski could supply the drugs, Hoffman badgered him to make a deal. He was last seen on his way to meet Kuklinski with $25,000 to buy prescription drugs. After a plea bargain, Kuklinski admitted to killing Hoffman. He stated that he lured Hoffman into a rented garage and tried to shoot him, but the gun jammed. Instead, he beat Hoffman to death with a tire iron, then stuffed the body into a 55-gallon drum and left it outside a motel in Little Ferry. One day, Kuklinski noticed that the drum had disappeared, but never learned what had happened to it. Hoffman's body was never recovered.

=== Gary Smith ===
By the early 1980s, Kuklinski's burglary ring was under investigation by law enforcement. In December 1982, Percy House, a gang member, was arrested. House agreed to inform on Kuklinski and was placed in protective custody. Warrants were also issued for the arrest of two other gang members, 37-year-old Gary Smith and Daniel Deppner. Kuklinski urged them to lie low and rented them a room at the York Motel in North Bergen. Smith left the motel to visit his daughter. Kuklinski feared that Smith, after he discussed going straight, might become an informant.

According to the testimony of Barbara Deppner, Kuklinski, Daniel Deppner, and House (who was in jail at the time) decided that Smith had to be killed. Kuklinski fed Smith a hamburger laced with cyanide, but when this was slow to work, Daniel strangled Smith with a lamp cord. According to forensic pathologist Michael Baden, Smith's death would probably have been attributed to something non-homicidal in nature, such as a drug overdose, if Kuklinski had relied solely on the poison. However, the ligature mark around Smith's neck and the fact that the body had been deliberately hidden suggested to investigators that he was murdered.

After Barbara did not return with a car to move Smith's body, Kuklinski and Daniel placed it between the mattress and box spring in the motel room. Over the next four days, a number of patrons rented the room, and although they found the smell odd, most did not think to look between the mattress and box spring. Finally, on December 27, 1982, after more complaints from guests about the smell, the motel manager investigated and discovered the decomposing corpse.

=== Daniel Deppner ===
After Smith's murder, Kuklinski had Daniel move to an apartment in Bergenfield that belonged to Rich Patterson, then-fiancé of Kuklinski's daughter Merrick. Patterson was away at the time, but Kuklinski possessed keys to the apartment. Between February and May 1983, Deppner was killed by Kuklinski. Investigators deduced he was murdered in the apartment after discovering a bloody carpet. Kuklinski enlisted Patterson's help to dispose of Deppner's body, telling Patterson the victim was a friend in trouble with law enforcement, and someone had broken in and killed him over the weekend. He added it was best to dump the body to avoid trouble with police, then forget about the incident.

Deppner's corpse was discovered on May 14, 1983, after a bicyclist riding Clinton Road, in a wooded area of West Milford, spotted the corpse surrounded by vultures. Kuklinski had wrapped the corpse inside green garbage bags before dumping it. Medical examiners listed Deppner's cause of death as "undetermined," although they noted pinkish spots on his skin, a possible sign of cyanide poisoning. Deppner was also strangled. Investigators guessed that Deppner had already been incapacitated, such as by poison, because the partially eaten corpse had no defensive wounds and healthy adult men are rarely killed by strangulation.

The medical examiner found Deppner's stomach full of undigested food, indicating that he had died shortly after or during a meal. The beans that Deppner had eaten were burned, so they reasoned the meal was home-cooked, since most restaurants would not get away with serving burned food to customers. Investigating officers discovered the corpse just three miles (5 kilometers) away from the ranch where Kuklinski's family often went horseback riding. Deppner was the third Kuklinski associate to be found dead.

=== Louis Masgay ===
On September 25, 1983, the body of 50-year-old Louis Masgay was discovered near Clausland Mountain Road in Orangetown, New York, with a bullet hole in the back of his head. Masgay had disappeared over two years earlier, on July 1, 1981, the day he was to meet Kuklinski at a New Jersey diner to purchase a large quantity of blank videocassettes for which Masgay had $95,000 in his van. After another plea bargain, Kuklinski admitted to shooting Masgay. His body had been stored in a freezer, then disposed of in the park fifteen months later.

However, Kuklinski did not thaw the corpse before he dumped it. He also wrapped it in plastic garbage bags, which kept it insulated and partially frozen. The Rockland County medical examiner found ice crystals inside the body on a warm September day. If the body had thawed before discovery, the medical examiner stated he probably would never have noticed Kuklinski's trickery. Investigators also realized Masgay was wearing the clothes his wife and son said he was wearing the day he disappeared. The discovery that Kuklinski froze Masgay's corpse encouraged law enforcement officers to nickname him "Iceman", a nickname frequently used in headlines.

== Additional victims ==
In various interviews, Kuklinski claimed to have murdered around 200 people. He alleged he used multiple methods of murder, including a crossbow, ice picks, a bomb attached to a remote controlled toy, firearms and grenades, as well as cyanide solution spray he considered to be his favorite. He also alleged that he committed his first murder at age 14, and murdered homeless people for practice. In 2006, Paul Smith, a member of the task force involved in arresting Kuklinski – and later a supervisor of the organized crime division of the New Jersey Attorney General's office – said: "I checked every one of the murders Kuklinski said he committed, and not one was true." He added, "Authorities throughout the country could not corroborate one case based on the tidbits Kuklinski gave." In 2020, Kuklinski investigator Dominick Polifrone said, "I don't believe he killed 200 people. I don't believe he killed 100 people. I'll go as high as 15, maybe."

Kuklinski also alleged he was a Mafia contract killer independently working for all the Five Families of New York City, as well as the DeCavalcante family of New Jersey. He claimed he carried out dozens of murders on behalf of Gambino family captain Roy DeMeo. He also claimed he was one of the murderers of Bonanno family boss Carmine Galante in July 1979, and Gambino family boss Paul Castellano in December 1985. For the Castellano murder, Kuklinski said he was personally recruited by John Gotti ally Sammy Gravano, who instructed him to kill Castellano's driver and bodyguard, Thomas Bilotti. He told author Philip Carlo that he was hired by John Gotti to kidnap, torture and murder John Favara, the man who accidentally hit and killed Gotti's twelve-year-old son Frank with his car.

Kuklinski's claimed involvement in Mafia hits has been disputed. According to Jerry Capeci, "Philip Carlo claims the Iceman killed Paul Castellano, Carmine Galante, and Jimmy Hoffa, along with Roy DeMeo and about 200 others. C'mon, do you believe that? I don't know anyone who believes that. No one." Capeci labelled Kuklinski "the Forrest Gump of mob hits". After he became a government witness in 1990, Gravano admitted to planning the murder of Castellano and Bilotti, but said the shooters were all members of Gotti's crew and were chosen by Gotti; he did not mention Kuklinski. Anthony Bruno felt Kuklinski's participation in the killing of Castellano was "highly unlikely". Bruno noted that in 1986, Anthony Indelicato was convicted of Galante's murder, and Kuklinski was not mentioned during the trial. Carlo also acknowledged that Kuklinski's claim to have been involved in Galante's murder was untrue. Former Colombo family capo Michael Franzese called Kuklinski a "pathological liar" and said, "I spent twenty-five years in that life, on the street. I never heard his name mentioned once. Not once."

Kuklinski claimed he dumped bodies in caves in Bucks County, Pennsylvania, and fed a victim to rats in the caves. However, in 2013, the Philadelphia Inquirer noted the caves have had multiple visitors since Kuklinski's time, and no human remains have been discovered. Local cave enthusiast Richard Kranzel also questioned the idea of flesh-eating rats, saying, "The only rats I encountered in caves are 'cave rats,' and they are reclusive and shy creatures, and definitely not fierce as Kuklinski claims." Law enforcement officers also doubt he stored a corpse for two years in a Mister Softee truck.

=== Robert Prongay ===
In interviews and documentaries, Kuklinski says he killed 38-year-old Robert Prongay, a mentor to him. Prongay was murdered on August 10, 1984, shot multiple times in the head, and was subsequently discovered in his Mister Softee ice cream truck in a garage he rented in North Bergen. Robbery was not considered a motive at the time. Prongay had been about to go on trial for blowing up the front door of his ex-wife's house. Kuklinski says that Prongay taught him to use cyanide and other methods to kill, and it was Prongay who told him to freeze the body of Masgay. However, Kuklinski says he killed Prongay after he threatened his family. Law enforcement officials have considered Kuklinski a prime suspect in the murder since 1986, but the director of the New Jersey Division of Criminal Justice said no charges were sought because Kuklinski had been convicted of other murders. In 1993, in response to his claims, the Hudson County Prosecutor said new charges against Kuklinski were possible since the Prongay murder was still an open investigation, and they would assess whether there was enough evidence to prosecute him. Ultimately, no charges were brought against Kuklinski for the Prongay murder.

=== Roy DeMeo ===
Kuklinski claimed he killed 42-year-old Gambino family soldier Roy DeMeo in an interview for the 1993 book The Iceman: The True Story of a Cold-Blooded Killer by Anthony Bruno. He described DeMeo as a mentor of his, but after he fell behind on a loan to distribute pornography, he received a beating. The two later became business partners. Kuklinski says DeMeo taught him how murder for hire could be a way to make money. However, author Jerry Capeci, who has written extensively about DeMeo and the Mafia, doubts Kuklinski killed DeMeo or had close ties to the DeMeo crew. Most sources indicate DeMeo was killed by members of his own crew, with no suggestion that Kuklinski was involved. Kuklinski is not mentioned in Capeci and Gene Mustain's book about the DeMeo crew, Murder Machine, or Albert DeMeo's account of his father's life in the mob, For the Sins of My Father. Philip Carlo, whose biography of Kuklinski includes the claim that he killed DeMeo, acknowledged in the postscript to a later edition that this claim was probably untrue.

=== Peter Calabro ===
In an interview for an HBO documentary in 2001, Kuklinski confessed to killing 36-year-old New York City Police Department (NYPD) auto crimes detective Peter Calabro, who was ambushed and shot dead by an unknown gunman in Saddle River, New Jersey, on March 14, 1980. Calabro was rumored to have mob connections and was investigated for selling confidential information to the Gambino family. Calabro's wife, Carmella, had drowned under mysterious circumstances three years earlier, and members of her family believed Calabro was responsible. At the time, the murder was thought by law enforcement officials to be revenge either carried out or arranged by his deceased wife's relatives. Her brothers were regarded as "key suspects," but the crime remained unsolved.

The Bergen County prosecutor believed Kuklinski's confession to be a fabrication, but his successor decided to proceed with the case. In February 2003, Kuklinski was charged with Calabro's murder and received another sentence of thirty years. This was considered a waste because Kuklinski was already serving multiple life sentences and would not be eligible for parole until he was over 100 years old. Describing the murder, Kuklinski said he parked his van on the side of a narrow road, forcing other drivers to slow to pass. He lay in a snowbank behind his van until Calabro came by at 2 a.m., then stepped out and shot him in the head with a sawed-off shotgun, decapitating Calabro. He stated he was unaware that Calabro was a police officer, but said he probably would have murdered him anyway.

Kuklinski claimed he was paid to kill Calabro by Gambino soldier (later underboss) Sammy Gravano, and that Gravano provided the murder weapon. Gravano, serving a twenty-year drug sentence in Arizona, was also indicted for the murder. Kuklinski was set to testify against him. Gravano denied any involvement in Calabro's death and rejected a plea bargain, under which he would receive no additional jail time if he confessed to the crime and informed on all his accomplices. The charges against Gravano were dropped after Kuklinski's death in 2006. In a 2025 interview, Gravano alleged that an imprisoned former mob associate had fed information on the Calabro murder to Kuklinski with the aim of falsely implicating Gravano in revenge for having given evidence against the Gambino family.

=== Jimmy Hoffa ===
In his 2001 HBO interview, Kuklinski said he knew who killed 62-year-old former Teamsters union president Jimmy Hoffa. Kuklinski did not claim any personal involvement in Hoffa's disappearance and presumed murder, and did not identify any culprit. However, he later claimed he killed Hoffa. In his account, Kuklinski was part of a four-man kidnapping team. They grabbed Hoffa in Detroit. While they were in the car, Kuklinski killed Hoffa by stabbing him with a large hunting knife. He said he drove Hoffa's corpse from Detroit to a New Jersey junkyard. It was placed in a drum, set on fire, and then buried in the junkyard. Later, fearing an accomplice might snitch, the drum was dug up, placed in the trunk of a car, compacted into a cube and sold to Japan as scrap metal along with hundreds of other compacted cars.

Deputy Chief Bob Buccino, who worked on the Kuklinski case, said: "They took a body from Detroit, where they have one of the biggest lakes in the world, and drove it all the way back to New Jersey? Come on." Buccino added: "We didn't believe a lot of things he said." Former FBI Special Agent Robert Garrity stated that Kuklinski's admission to killing Hoffa was "a hoax", and that Kuklinski was never a suspect in Hoffa's disappearance, adding: "I never heard of him." Anthony Bruno said he investigated Kuklinski's alleged involvement in Hoffa's disappearance but felt "[his] story didn't check out." He opined Kuklinski made the confession to "add extra value to his brand", and omitted the story from his biography of Kuklinski.

== Investigation and arrest ==
Kuklinski came to the attention of Pat Kane, an officer with the New Jersey State Police, when an informant helped Kane connect him to a gang carrying out burglaries in northern New Jersey. Kane built a file on Kuklinski. Eventually, five unsolved homicides—Hoffman, Smith, Deppner, Masgay, and Malliband—were linked to Kuklinski because he was the last person to see each of them alive. A joint task force of law enforcement officials titled "Operation Iceman" was created between the New Jersey Attorney General's office and the Bureau of Alcohol, Tobacco, and Firearms (ATF) dedicated to arresting and convicting Kuklinski. The ATF was involved due to Kuklinski's firearm sales.

ATF Special Agent Dominick Polifrone went undercover for eighteen months to apprehend Kuklinski. Starting in 1985, Kane and Polifrone worked with Phil Solimene, a close long-time friend of Kuklinski, to get Polifrone close to Kuklinski. Posing as a Mafia-connected criminal named Dominic Provenzano, Polifrone purchased a handgun-muffler combination from Kuklinski. In recordings, Kuklinski discussed a corpse he kept in a freezer for two and a half years. He told Polifrone he preferred poison, saying, "Why be messy? You do it nice and calm." He asked Polifrone if he could supply him with pure cyanide. Polifrone told Kuklinski he wanted to hire him to murder a wealthy Jewish cocaine dealer, and recorded Kuklinski speaking in detail about how he would do it. Kuklinski was also recorded boasting he killed a man by putting cyanide on his hamburger, and of his plans to kill "a couple of rats" (Barbara Deppner and Percy House).

On December 17, 1986, Kuklinski met Polifrone to get cyanide for a planned murder, which was to be an attempt on an undercover police officer. After the recorded conversation with Polifrone, Kuklinski went for a walk. He tested Polifrone's purported cyanide on a stray dog, using a hamburger as bait, and saw it was not poison. Suspicious, Kuklinski decided not to go through with the planned murder and went home instead. He was arrested at a roadblock two hours later. Kuklinski's wife was charged with interfering with her husband's arrest. Officers discovered a firearm in the vehicle, and she was charged with possession of a firearm because she was a passenger.

== Trial and incarceration ==
Prosecutors charged Kuklinski with five counts of murder and six weapons violations, as well as attempted murder, robbery, and attempted robbery. Law enforcement officials said Kuklinski had large sums of money in Swiss bank accounts and had a flight reservation to that country. Kuklinski was held on a $2 million bail bond, and required to surrender his passport. After the arrest, Kuklinski told reporters, "This is unwarranted, unnecessary. These guys watch too many movies." At a press conference, New Jersey state Attorney General W. Cary Edwards characterized the motive for the murders as "profit" and said, ″He set individuals up for business deals, they disappeared, and the money ended up in his hands.″

At trial, Kuklinski's former associates, including Percy House and Barbara Deppner, gave evidence against him, as did ATF Special Agent Polifrone. The case was prosecuted by Deputy Attorney General Robert Carrol, and Kuklinski was represented by a public defender. Kuklinski's lawyer argued Kuklinski had no history of violence, and only projected a "tough image," including his statements to ATF Special Agent Polifrone. The defence theorized Deppner was responsible for the murder of Smith, and there was no cause of death determined for Deppner. Additionally, he argued the testimony of House and Barbara Deppner was unreliable because they lied to law enforcement officials, and House received immunity from prosecution. In March 1988, jurors found Kuklinski guilty of murdering Smith and Deppner, but found the deaths were not proven to be by Kuklinski's conduct, so that he would not face the death penalty. He was sentenced to a minimum 60 years in prison.

After the trial, Kuklinski pleaded guilty to killing Masgay and Malliband, and was sentenced to an additional two life sentences to be served consecutively. State prosecutors explained he would spend the rest of his life in prison even if he successfully appealed his previous convictions. Kuklinski also confessed to killing Hoffman, but prosecutors decided not to go to trial, as they had a weak case and additional life sentences would not have made any difference to Kuklinski's prison term. As part of the plea bargains, the firearm charge against his wife and an unrelated marijuana possession charge against his son were dismissed. Kuklinski was ineligible for parole until 2046, when he would have been 111 years old. He was incarcerated at Trenton State Prison.

During his incarceration, Kuklinski granted interviews to prosecutors, psychiatrists, criminologists, and writers. Several television producers also spoke to Kuklinski about his criminal career, upbringing, and personal life. These talks culminated in three televised documentaries known as The Iceman Tapes, broadcast on HBO in 1992, 2001, and 2003. According to his daughter, Merrick Kuklinski, her mother convinced Richard to do the interviews and she was paid "handsomely" for them. In the last installment, The Iceman and the Psychiatrist, Kuklinski was interviewed by forensic psychiatrist Park Dietz in 2002. Dietz stated he believed Kuklinski suffered from antisocial personality disorder plus paranoid personality disorder. Writers Anthony Bruno and Philip Carlo wrote biographies of Kuklinski. Kuklinski's wife, Barbara, received a share of the profits from the Bruno book.

== Death ==
In October 2005, after nearly eighteen years in prison, Kuklinski was diagnosed with Kawasaki disease. He was transferred to a secure wing at St. Francis Medical Center in Trenton, New Jersey. Although he had asked doctors to make sure they revived him if he developed cardiopulmonary arrest, his former wife Barbara had signed a "do not resuscitate" order. A week before his death, the hospital called Barbara to ask if she wished to rescind the instruction, but she declined. Kuklinski died at age 70 on March 5, 2006. At the request of Kuklinski's family, forensic pathologist Michael Baden reviewed his autopsy report. Baden confirmed that Kuklinski died of cardiac arrest and had been suffering from heart disease and phlebitis.

== Sources ==
- Bruno, Anthony (2013) [1993]. The Iceman: The True Story of a Cold-Blooded Killer. ROBERT HALE LTD. ISBN 9780709052722.
- Bruno, Anthony (2018). Immortal Monster. DarkHorse Multimedia. ASIN B07GTD1KX5.
- Camisa, H.; Franklin, J. (2003). Inside Out: Fifty Years Behind the Walls of New Jersey's Trenton State Prison. Windsor Press. ISBN 978-0-9726473-0-4.
- Carlo, Philip (2006). The Ice Man: Confessions of a Mafia Contract Killer. New York, New York: St. Martin's Press. ISBN 978-0-312-34928-8.
- Carlo, Philip (2009). The Butcher: Anatomy of a Mafia Psychopath. Mainstream Publishing. p. 84. ISBN 9781845965075.
- DeMeo, Albert (2003). For the Sins of My Father: A Mafia Killer, His Son and the Legacy of a Mob Life. Harper Collins. ISBN 978-1854109187.
- Maas, Peter (1997). Underboss. HarperCollins. pp. 367–385. ISBN 0-7862-1253-5.
- Mustain, Gene; Capeci, Jerry (2012). Murder Machine. Ebury Press. pp. 348–351. ISBN 978-0091941123.
