= Scott Marlowe =

American actor (1932–2001)

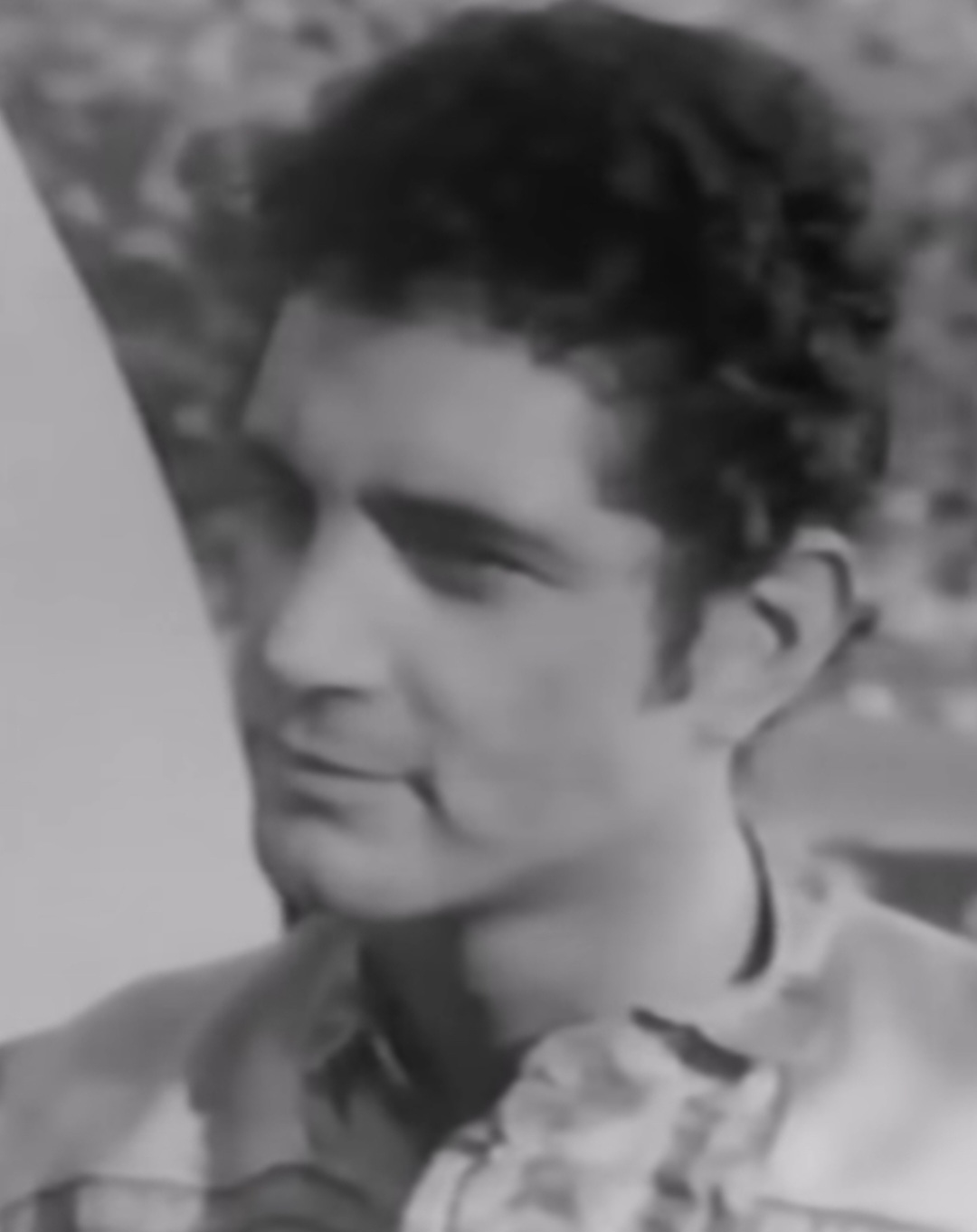
- Marlowe in an episode of One Step Beyond (1961)
- Born: Ronald Richard DeLeo; June 24, 1932; Newark, New Jersey, U.S.
- Died: January 6, 2001 (aged 68); Los Angeles, California, U.S.
- Occupation: Actor
- Years active: 1951–1998

Scott Marlowe (born Ronald Richard DeLeo; June 24, 1932 – January 6, 2001) was an American actor. He had starring roles in the teen exploitation film The Cool and the Crazy (1958, alongside Dick Bakalyan) and the May-December independent film, A Cold Wind in August (1961, opposite Lola Albright). He was a founding member of Theatre West.

== Career ==
=== Film ===
Marlowe, born Ronald Richard DeLeo, the son of Emile and Concetta DeLeo, made his film debut with an uncredited role in Attila (1955). Over the next few years, he began accruing supporting parts in several films, co-starring opposite Leslie Caron in Gaby (1956); in Michael Curtiz’s film noir, The Scarlet Hour (1956); with Russ Tamblyn in The Young Guns (1956); opposite the Robert Ryan-led ensemble cast of Men in War (1957); and a young Anne Bancroft in The Restless Breed (1957).

However, in 1958, he garnered a pair of lead roles in teen exploitation films dealing with juvenile delinquency: Young and Wild and The Cool and the Crazy — the latter of which not only co-starred another rising star in the subgenre, Richard Bakalyan, but proved to be Marlowe's breakthrough role. He followed this up with Riot in Juvenile Prison (1959) and The Subterraneans (1960). The latter featured an all-star cast and was adapted from Jack Kerouac's novel, albeit severely diluted from its original beatnik content.

In 1961, he starred opposite Lola Albright in the May-December independent romantic drama, A Cold Wind in August. Despite only being eight years younger than her, Marlowe portrayed a character half of Albright's age who was seduced and fell in love, but complications arose when her burlesque stripper past interfered with his idealized perception. Subsequently, concentrating on television, his film roles dissipated after that. After Lonnie (1963), Marlowe would not appear in another feature film until Journey into Fear (1975), followed by Circle of Power (1981). In the 1990s, he had roles in one more theatrical film, Chasers (1994). The last two, Lightning in a Bottle (1998) and Counter Measures (1999), both went direct-to-video on VHS.

=== Television ===
Scott Marlowe appeared in over 100 credited acting roles during his career of 44 years on American television. He was frequently billed a guest star, and appeared on many popular drama, action, sci-fi and fantasy TV shows, including: Route 66, The Wild Wild West, The Time Tunnel, Hawaii Five-O, Mannix, Barnaby Jones, Mission: Impossible, Marcus Welby, M.D., Wonder Woman, The Rockford Files, Fame, Beauty and the Beast, thirtysomething and Matlock.

In 1951 he was first cast in the Pulitzer Prize Playhouse episode "Hostage". This was the start of several roles he would take in various anthology series on television, primarily in 50’s and early 60’s, and occasionally thereafter into the 80's. In 1955, he appeared on Star Tonight which showcased young actors in adapted contemporary literary works. The next year in the episode "In Summer Promise" on General Electric Theater, he starred with Joan Fontaine as a young man who charms an older woman into love who doesn’t know he is to marry his childhood sweetheart. On Zane Grey Theatre, he starred with Ronald and Nancy Reagan in the 1961 episode "The Long Shadow". He would go on to star in Alfred Hitchcock Presents, One Step Beyond, Thriller, Kraft Suspense Theatre, Police Story and Freddy's Nightmares.

As his recognition from feature film roles grew, his television career took off and Marlowe began starring in Westerns. He excelled in playing the hotheaded, mean-spirited or misguided youth with little regard for custom or law. He would star in 18 episodes on Western themed shows from 1958 to 1966, making a significant contribution to the genre as he solidified his position into a prominent television actor.

In 1958, he played the son of the title character (played by James Whitmore) in the Wagon Train episode "The Gabe Carswell Story". In 1960, he starred opposite Clint Walker playing a white man raised by Apaches, married to a once-captive Mexican woman (Lisa Montell) reintegrating into his home town in the Cheyenne episode "Apache Blood". Also in 1960, he played a young man masquerading as Billy the Kid in "The Show Off" on Law of the Plainsman. In 1962, he guest-starred on Stoney Burke in "Point of Honor" as a troubled, would-be bull rider. The following year, he starred in "Legends Don't Sleep" as an aimless youth who venerates a newly released older ex-con (William Talman) who was once an infamous outlaw, in one of his four appearances on Gunsmoke. Marlowe had three notably sympathetic roles in Have Gun – Will Travel: as an innocent man about to be hanged in "The Hanging of Roy Carter" (1958), as an earnest and seemingly naive Native American appointed sheriff in "Charley Red Dog" (1959) and as an Austrian prince deceived by his advisor (Eduard Franz) in "Duke of Texas" (1961). In 1964, he was a special guest star playing an outlaw whose gang robs the Cartwrights with the sham help of Will Cartwright (Guy Madison) in "The Roper" on Bonanza.

After the release of Lonnie in 1963, his theatrical film work became limited, and he increasingly turned to television roles. During the mid-1960s, he moved away from his earlier "bad-boy" screen image and began appearing in a wider range of television dramas, including legal, police, medical and mystery series. He was often cast in antagonist or "heavy" roles, which helped establish him as a recurring guest actor on primetime television. Over the following decades, he continued to appear in television productions, with credits extending into the 1990s.

In these dramas he was typically cast as the antagonist (usually a criminal or other unsavory character), such as: a developmentally disabled skiing murderer on Route 66 in the 1961 episode "Effigy in Snow"; on Kraft Suspense Theatre in 1964 as a convicted-then-commuted murderer who kidnaps and intends to kill the judge (Ronald Reagan) who sent him to the gas chamber in "A Cruel and Unusual Night"; in 1972 as a songwriter wrongfully suing a singer (Peggy Lee) for plagiarism on Owen Marshall, Counselor at Law in "Smiles from Yesterday" (featuring a young Mark Hamill); a counterfeiter in 1974 on Mannix in "The Green Man" and, on T.J. Hooker as the disgraced ex-partner of Hooker (William Shatner) who kidnaps his daughter in "The Ransom” (1985).

Marlowe appeared twice in the original The Outer Limits. As the starring lead in the 1963 episode "It Crawled Out of the Woodwork", he played a worried brother searching for a missing-then-dead scientist played by Michael Forest, with BarBara Luna as his girlfriend and Ed Asner as the investigating police detective. In the 1964 episode "The Forms of Things Unknown" he co-starred with Vera Miles, David McCallum, and Cedric Hardwicke playing a smarmy, blackmailing playboy who won’t stay dead. Much of the footage for this latter episode served as the basis of a reworked plot (using additionally filmed scenes and a different ending) of a pilot created for an unsold horror anthology series called The Unknown.

Between 1966 and 1973 he appeared ten times on The F.B.I. taking on nine different characters in the episodes: "The Price of Death" (1966) as a murderous kidnapper teamed with his brother (Robert Blake), whose comatose victim may die without insulin; "Overload" (1967) as a newly-released ex-con with a feline companion, intend on killing the woman (Diana Hyland) he assaulted, while eluding the FBI during a power blackout; "The Tunnel" (1968); "The Young Warriors" (1969); "Blood Tie" (1969); "The Fatal Connection" (1971); "The Mastermind: Parts 1 & 2" (1971); "The Rap Taker" (1973); and "The Exchange" (1973).

Beginning in the 1970’s Marlowe played in several made-for-television films starting with the Ted Post-directed sci-fi horror Night Slaves (1970), followed by Travis Logan, D.A. (1971), The Critical List (1978), Thou Shalt Not Kill (1982), the Lee Grant-directed drama No Place Like Home (1989), Seasons of the Heart (1994, starring Carol Burnett), and Following Her Heart (1994, starring Ann-Margret).

Later in his career he had recurring roles on four broadcast TV series: the early-cancelled Andy Griffith police drama Adams of Eagle Lake (1975); the short-lived nighttime soap Executive Suite (1976); and, on the daytime soaps Another World (1979) and Days of Our Lives (1984). He took a turn at comedy in 1990 as a guest star with a two-episode character arc playing a gangster kingpin in the sitcom Perfect Strangers. In 1991, Marlowe starred as the Bajoran refugee leader in the Star Trek: The Next Generation episode "Ensign Ro". In the 1994 syndicated series Valley of the Dolls he played the character "Michael Burke" in the principal cast, which ran for 65 episodes. Marlowe’s last known television appearance was in the 1995 episode "School for Murder" on Murder, She Wrote.

== Death ==
Marlowe died of a heart attack in Los Angeles on January 6, 2001, at age 68.

== Filmography ==
=== Film ===
Year	Title	Role	Notes	Ref(s)
1955	Attila	Uncredited		
1956	Gaby	Jan		
1956	The Scarlet Hour	Vince		
1956	The Young Guns	Knox Cutler		
1957	Men in War	Private Meredith		
1957	The Restless Breed	James Allan		
1958	Young and Wild	Richard Edward ‘Rick’ Braden		
1958	The Cool and the Crazy	Bennie Saul		
1959	Riot in Juvenile Prison	Eddie Bassett		
1960	The Subterraneans	Julien Alexander		
1961	A Cold Wind in August	Vito Pellegrino		
1963	Lonnie	Lonnie		
1975	Journey into Fear	Jose		
1981	Circle of Power	Ted Bartel	Also known as Mystique, Brainwash and The Naked Weekend.	
1994	Chasers	Fast Food Clown		
1998	Lightening in a Bottle	Sydney Langley	Direct-to-video	
1999	Counter Measures	Ambassador Silver	Also known as Crash Dive II.; Direct-to-video	

=== Television ===
Year	Title	Role	Notes	Ref(s)
1951	Pulitzer Prize Playhouse	Cast member	Episode: "Hostage" (S1E36)	
1955	Star Tonight	Cast member	Episode: "One More Day" (S2E07)	
1956	Matinee Theater	Cast member	Episode: "Bottom of the River" (S1E56)	
1956	General Electric Theater	John Goodwin	Episode: "In Summer Promise" (S4E18)	
1956	Wire Service	Ricci	Episode: "High Adventure" (S1E12)	
1957	Studio 57	Lt. Cushing	Episode: "Rebel Rookie" (S4E09)	
1957	Schlitz Playhouse of Stars	Cast member	Episode: "Pattern for Death" (S7E16)	
1957	Lux Video Theatre	Kermit	Episode: "The Latch Key" (S7E39)	
1958	Flight	Cast member	Episode: "Texas Fliers" (S1E18)	
1958	Wagon Train	Jess "Little Elk" Caswell	Episode: "The Gabe Carswell Story" (S1E18)	
1958	Have Gun - Will Travel	Roy Carter	Episode: "The Hanging of Roy Carter" (S2E4)	
1958	Bronco	John Wesley Hardin	Episode: "The Turning Point" (S1E03)	
1959	Have Gun - Will Travel	Marshall Charley Red Dog	Episode: "Charley Red Dog" (S3E13)	
1959	The Further Adventures of Ellery Queen	Cast Member	Episode: "Confession of Murder" (S1E27)	
1960	Hotel de Paree	Kid	Episode: "Sundance and the Kid from Nowhere" (S1E15)	
1960	Cheyenne	Mickey Free/Ward	Episode: "Apache Blood" (S4E10)	
1960	Law of the Plainsman	Clancy James	Episode: "The Show Off" (S1E24)	
1961	Zane Grey Theater	Jimmy Budd	Episode: "The Long Shadow" (S5E15)	
1961	Alfred Hitchcock Presents	Eliot Gray	Episode: "The Throwback" (S6E20)	
1961	Route 66	Armand Fontaine	Episode: "Effigy in Snow" (S1E21)	
1961	Have Gun - Will Travel	Duke Franz von Pishin	Episode: "Duke of Texas" (S4E31)	
1961	One Step Beyond	Mario	Episode: "The Gift" (S3E19)	
1961	Straightaway	Les	Episode: "Die Laughing" (S1E5)	
1961	The Aquanauts	Ernie Baron	Episode: "The Frankie Adventure" (S1E25)	
1961	Thriller	Julian Boucher	Episode: "The Premature Burial" (S2E03)	
1961	Target: The Corruptors!	Phil Manzak	Episode: "Mr Megalomania" (S1E08)	
1962	Stoney Burke	Soames Hewitt	Episode: "Point of Honor" (S1E04)	
1962	Saints and Sinners	Frederick Brennen	Episode: "Source of Information" (S1E5)	
1962	Dr. Kildare	Dr Eddie Moore	Episode: "The Dragon" (S1E20)	
1962	Target: The Corruptors!	Tito	Episode: "A Man’s Castle" (S1E26)	
1962	The Detectives	Frank Worden	Episode: "Night Boat" (S3E20)	
1962	Checkmate	Daniel Brack	Episode: "Brooding Fixation" (S2E22)	
1962	King of Diamonds	Danny Hode	Episode: "The Set Up" (S1E25)	
1962	The Eleventh Hour	Stanley Filmore	Episode: "Where Have You Been, Lord Randall, My Son" (S1E14)	
1963	Gunsmoke	Britt	Episode: "Legends Don’t Sleep" (S9E03)	
1963	The Outer Limits	Jory Peters	Episode: "It Crawled Out of the Woodwork" (S1E11)	
1963	Ben Casey	Jason Landros	Episode: "For this Relief, Much Thanks" (S3E01). The events of this episode were continued in the series debut of Breaking Point.	
1963	Breaking Point	Jason Landros	Episode: "Solo for B-Flat Clarinet" (S1E01). A continuation of a two-part story that began on the Ben Casey episode, "For This Relief, Much Thanks".	
1963	The Nurses	Paul Wheeler	Episode: "Bitter Pill" (S1E30)	
1964	Kraft Suspense Theatre	Johnny Baroja	Episode: "My Enemy, This Town" (S1E15)	
1964	Bonanza	Lee Hewitt	Episode: "The Roper" (S5E27)	
1964	Kraft Suspense Theatre	Sherman "Sherm" Tyler	Episode: "A Cruel and Unusual Night" (S1E28)	
1964	The Outer Limits	Andre Pavan	Episode: "The Forms of Things Unknown" (S1E32)	
1964	The Unknown	Andre Pavan	An unaired pilot episode for a declined ABC series from a rework of "The Forms of Things to Unknown".	
1964	Gunsmoke	Tony Serpa	Episode: "Hung High" (S10E8)	
1964	Rawhide	Tate	Episode: "Canliss" (S7E6)	
1965	Gunsmoke	Lonnie Blane	Episode: "Thursday’s Child" (S10E24)	
1965	The Wild Wild West	Ahkeema	Episode: "The Night of the Howling Light" (S1E14)	
1966	The F.B.I.	Casey	Episode: "The Price of Death" (S2E1)	
1966	Gunsmoke	Ed	Episode: "The Brothers" (S11E25)	
1966	The Time Tunnel	Jeremiah Gebhardt	Episode: "The Death Trap" (S1E12)	
1967	The F.B.I.	Charles Nyack	Episode: "Overload" (S3E8)	
1968	Mannix	Steve Cade	Episode: "You Can Get Killed Out There" (S1E19)	
1968	The F.B.I.	Eugene Waring	Episode: "The Tunnel" (S3E26)	
1969	The F.B.I.	William Rockhill	Episode: "The Young Warriors" (S4E24)	
1969	The Outsider	Joe Andrade	Episode: "A Bowl of Cherries" (S1E17)	
1969	The F.B.I.	Ricky Kriton	Episode: "Blood Tie" (S5E9)	
1970	Mission: Impossible	Josef Czerny	Episode: "The Martyr"	
1970	Night Slaves	Matt Russell	Television Movie - ABC (Aired 9/29/1970)	
1970	Lancer	Billy Kells	Episode: "The Experiment" (S2E18)	
1971	Travis Logan, D.A.	George Carnera	Television Movie - CBS (from a repackaged TV pilot)	
1971	The F.B.I.	Duke Bergan	Episode: "The Fatal Connection" (S6E19)	
1971	Medical Center	Steve	Episode: "Double Jeopardy" (S3E4)	
1971	The Mod Squad	Keech Thompson	Episode: "The Sentinels" (S4E1)	
1971	The F.B.I.	Clenard Massey	Episodes: "The Mastermind Parts 1 & 2" (S7E6&7)	
1972	The Streets of San Francisco	Dimitri Kampacalas	Episode: "Bitter Wine" (S1E12)	
1972	Cade's County	Leo Rand	Episode: "Inferno" (S1E19)	
1972	Owen Marshall, Counselor at Law	Boyd Davies	Episode: "Smiles from Yesterday" (S1E21)	
1972	Ironside	Jeffrey	Episode: "The Deadly Gamesmen" (S6E10)	
1973	Cannon	Pappy Harris	Episode: "To Ride a Tiger" (S2E19)	
1973	The F.B.I.	Bob Stern	Episode: "The Rap Taker" (S8E16)	
1973	The F.B.I.	Ray Curtis	Episode: "The Exchange" (S9E5)	
1974	Police Story	Terry Young	Episodes: "Countdown: Parts 1 & 2" (S1E12&13)	
1974	Barnaby Jones	Vincent Talbot	Episode: "Friends Till Death" (S2E19)	
1974	Mannix	Turner Dabney	Episode: "The Green Man" (S8E5)	
1974	Hawaii Five-O	Army/Starwood	Episode: "The Young Assassins" (S7E01)	
1975	Adams of Eagle Lake	Ron Selleck	Reoccurring Character - 2 Episodes (S1E1&2)	
1976	Executive Suite	Nick Koslo	Recurring Character 1976-1977 - 10 Episodes	
1978	Wonder Woman	Angie	Episode: "The Deadly Sting" (S3E3)	
1978	The Critical List	Dr Albert Dubron	Television Movie - NBC (Aired 9/11/1978)	
1978	Quincy, M.E.	Joe DiCenzio	Episode: "The Last Six Hours" (S4E1)	
1978	The Rockford Files	Augie Arnow	Episode: "Local Man Eaten by Newspaper" (S5E11)	
1979	Another World	Frank Lansing	Recurring Character - 4 Episodes (1.3812, 1.3818, 1.3824 & 1.3877)	
1979	Barnaby Jones	Peter	Episode: "Fatal Overdose" (S7E19)	
1982	Thou Shalt Not Kill	Mr. Lochman	Television Movie - NBC (Filmed 1979; Aired 4/12/1982)	
1982	The Fall Guy	Bill	Episode: "Three for the Road" (S1E21)	
1983	The Powers of Mathew Star	Latimer	Episode: "The Great Waldo Shepard" (S1E19)	
1984	Automan	Robert Sawyer	Episode: "Ships in the Night" (S1E4)	
1984	Days of Our Lives	Eric Brady	Recurring Character - 6 Episodes	
1984	Matt Houston	John	Episode: "Blood Money" (S3E10)	
1985	Fame	Bob Demeter	Episode: "Danny De Bergerac" (S4E18)	
1985	T.J. Hooker	Marty Lathon	Episode: "The Ransom" (S5E1)	
1985	Cagney & Lacey	Claude Sycamore	Episode: "Lottery" (S5E4)	
1989	Hunter	Ray Brill	Episode: "On Air" (S6E1)	
1989	Beauty and the Beast	Richard Nolan	Episode: "Trial" (S2E17)	
1989	No Place Like Home	Eddie Cooper	Television Movie - CBS (Aired 12/3/1989)	
1989	thirtysomething	Leo Steadman	Episode: "Michael’s Campaign" (S3E10)	
1989	Freddy's Nightmares	Dr. Brandon Kepler	Episode: "Death Come True" (S2E1)	
1990	Perfect Strangers	Marco Madison	2 Episodes: "The Men Who Knew Too Much: Parts 1 & 2" (S6E7&8)	
1990	Matlock	Al Blackman	2 Episodes: "The Informer: Parts 1 & 2" (S4E20&21)	
1990	Father Dowling Mysteries	Jack Patton	Episode: "The Murder Weekend Mystery" (S3E7)	
1991	Equal Justice	Mr. Weiss	Episode: "Endgame" (S2E2)	
1991	Star Trek: The Next Generation	Keeve Falor	Episode: "Ensign Ro" (S5E03)	
1991	Jake and the Fatman	Moffit	Episode: "I Cover the Waterfront" (S6E17)	
1994	McKenna	Bobby Clark	Episode: "The Pursuit" (S1E6)	
1994	Seasons of the Heart	Mike Santucci	Television Movie - NBC (Aired 5/24/1994)	
1994	Following Her Heart	Frank	Television Movie - NBC (Aired 11/28/1994)	
1994	Valley of the Dolls	Michael Burke	Principal cast member - 65 Episodes	
1995	Murder, She Wrote	Avery Nugent	Episode: "School for Murder" (S11E19)	
