= Skip Young =

Skip Young may refer to:

- Skip Young (actor) (1930–1993), American actor
- Skip Young (wrestler) (1951–2010), American professional wrestler
