= Following Her Heart =

- Genre: Comedy drama
- Written by: Merry M. Helm
- Directed by: Lee Grant
- Starring: Ann-Margret; George Segal; Brenda Vaccaro
- Music by: Mark Snow
- Country of origin: United States
- Original language: English

Production
- Executive producers: Alan Margulies; Roger Smith; Roni Weisberg; Patrick Markey; Peter Sussman
- Producers: Roni Weisberg; Sally Young; R.J. Cavallaro
- Cinematography: Douglas Milsome
- Editor: Patrick McMahon
- Running time: 100 minutes
- Production companies: Atlantis Films; Roni Weisberg Productions; Ann-Margret Productions

Original release
- Network: NBC
- Release: November 28, 1994

Following Her Heart is a 1994 American made-for-television comedy-drama film directed by actress and filmmaker Lee Grant and written by Merry Helm. The film starred Ann-Margret and George Segal, among others and was first broadcast on NBC on November 28, 1994.

== Plot ==
A dramatic comedy with musical performance sequences, the film follows a recently widowed woman (Ann-Margret) who rediscovers herself while traveling with a group on Grand Ole Opry fans on a guided country music tour. Segal and Grant had worked together on another NBC television film released that same year, Seasons of the Heart.

== Cast ==
- Ann-Margret... Ingalill "Lena" Lundquist
- George Segal... Harry
- Brenda Vaccaro... Cecile
- William Morgan Sheppard... Anders Lundquist
- Kirk Baltz... Kenny
- Scott Marlowe... Frank
- Greg Mullavey... Elroy
- Alexandra Powers... Nola Lundquist
- Travis Tritt... Himself
