= Young and Wild (1958 film) =

1958 film by William Witney

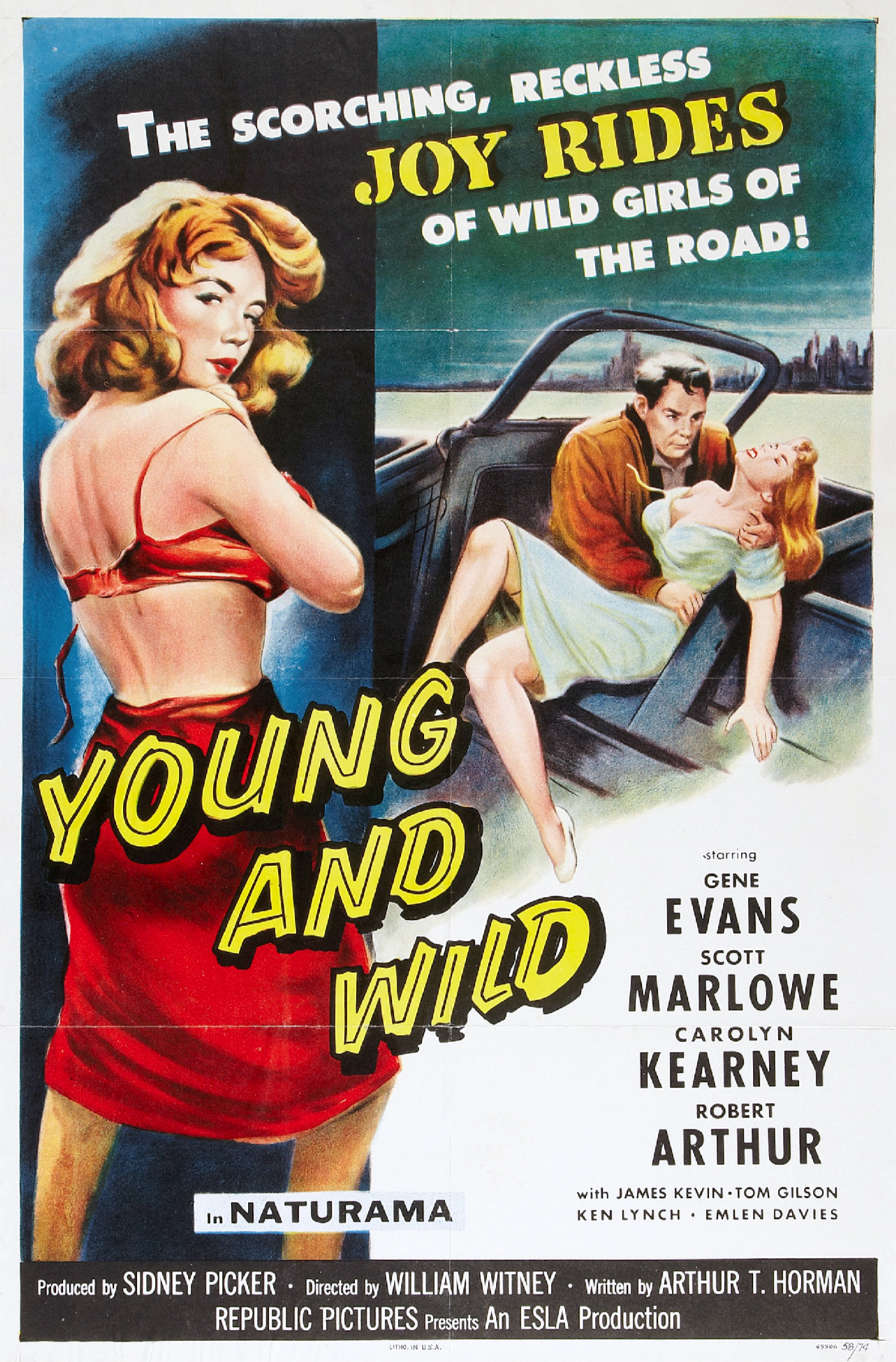
- Theatrical release poster
- Directed by: William Witney
- Screenplay by: Arthur T. Horman
- Produced by: Sidney Picker
- Starring: Gene Evans; Scott Marlowe; Carolyn Kearney; Robert Arthur; Weston Gavin; Tom Gilson
- Cinematography: Jack A. Marta
- Edited by: Joseph Harrison
- Production company: Esla Pictures Inc.
- Distributed by: Republic Pictures
- Release date: April 24, 1958
- Running time: 69 minutes
- Country: United States
- Language: English

Young and Wild is a 1958 American crime film directed by William Witney and written by Arthur T. Horman. The film stars Gene Evans, Scott Marlowe, Carolyn Kearney, Robert Arthur, Weston Gavin and Tom Gilson. The film was released on April 24, 1958, by Republic Pictures.

== Plot ==
Rick, Allie and Beejay are walking down the street looking for kicks. They harass a couple of young women to no avail. Rick, the leader of the three, reaches for a smoke, but has no light. Allie notices the nearby parked car is unlocked and reaches in to get the car cigarette lighter for Rick. Allie finds the keys are in the car, and they climb in, with Rick at the wheel.

They cruise the neighborhood, stopping at a drive-in diner. A young couple, Jerry and Valerie, are parked beside them. Jerry goes inside leaving Valerie alone. The trio harass her and mock Jerry when he returns. The young couple leave, and Rick and his friends follow them.

They chase them on the road, eventually forcing them off the road. Allie and Beejay proceed to beat up Jerry, and Rick harasses Valerie with evil intent.

Fortunately, an approaching vehicle interrupts them, and the trio jump in the stolen car and drive off. Their cruising continues and with a lack of attention to the road, knock a woman to the ground, driving off with no remorse.

The police interview the young couple, and they agree to try and identify the culprits. They do identify Rick, but when Detective Sergeant Janusz questions him, he has an alibi, corroborated by Beejay’s uncle.

Rick realises that the young couple have identified him, and together with Allie and Beejay, finds Valerie’s house. They force their way in, threatening her parents and when Jerry arrives, beat him up again.

Rick is in the police line-up, but Jerry and Valerie both lie and do not identify him.

Thinking the drama is all behind them, Jerry and Valerie are at college, when Jerry leaves her for a moment. Rick pulls up in his work car and again harasses Valerie. This time he forces himself on her, kissing her. Other students interrupt him, and he takes off. Jerry comes back finding her terribly upset. They realize they were foolish for lying to the police and go and see Janusz.

Janusz tells them of the woman that was killed and they concoct a plan to make Rick think he will now be identified and arrested. Allie is brought in for questioning, and he overhears that Valerie is headed to the family cabin in the woods. Janusz leaves instructions that Allie is not to be released until 2:00pm, and leaves with Jerry to go to the family cabin.

However, Beejay’s uncle comes in demanding his release, and he is released early. Rick, Allie and Beejay drive to the cabin, and find Valerie all alone. Her parents had gone to the shop for groceries, and Janusz and Jerry had not arrived yet as they went to the local police station first.

The hoodlums attack Valerie, and she reaches for an unloaded shotgun mounted on the wall. They take it off her, but do find some shells, proceeding to load it. Janusz and the local policeman approach the cabin warily, but soon there is a confrontation, and they are forced to disarm under threat of the shotgun.

Jerry has parked the car down the road, and approaching the cabin, can see what has happened. He charges Rick from behind, and manages to overcome him, beating him senseless, with some satisfaction. The other hoodlums surrender meekly, and their crime days are over.

== Cast ==
- Gene Evans as Det. Sgt. Fred Janusz
- Scott Marlowe as Richard Edward 'Rick' Braden
- Carolyn Kearney as Valerie Whitman
- Robert Arthur as Jerry Coltrin
- Weston Gavin as 'Allie' Allison
- Tom Gilson as Bruce 'Beejay' Phillips
- Ken Lynch as David Whitman
- Emlen Davies as Mrs. Whitman
- Morris Ankrum as Police Capt. Egan
- Wendell Holmes as Lewis J. Christopher
- John Zaremba as Sgt. Larsen
