= Adams of Eagle Lake =

American television series

- Genre: Drama
- Created by: Lane Slate
- Written by: Jonathan Daly; John Michael Hayes; Lane Slate; Charles Stewart
- Directed by: Lawrence Dobkin; Walter Grauman; Jud Taylor
- Starring: Andy Griffith; Abby Dalton; Nick Nolte
- Composers: Jerry Goldsmith; Harry V. Lojewski
- Country of origin: United States
- Original language: English
- No. of episodes: 2

Production
- Executive producer: Richard O. Linke
- Producers: Walter Grauman; Burt Nodella; Charles Stewart
- Production locations: Big Bear Lake, California; Fawnskin, California
- Cinematography: Robert B. Hauser
- Running time: 60 minutes
- Production company: Andy Griffith Enterprises

Original release
- Network: ABC
- Release: January 10 – February 26, 1975

Adams of Eagle Lake is an American hour-long police series that aired on ABC in 1975. Andy Griffith starred as Chief of Police Sam Adams and the episodes presented his attempts to maintain the law in a small resort town. The show lasted for two episodes.

== Background ==
In 1974, Griffith starred in Winter Kill, a television movie that was intended as a series pilot. When it failed to sell, the main character of Sheriff Sam McNeill was renamed and used as the lead character in Adams of Eagle Lake.

== Cast and characters ==
- Andy Griffith as Sheriff Sam Adams
- Abby Dalton as Margaret Kelly
- Nick Nolte as Officer Jerry Troy
- Iggie Wolfington as Officer Jubal Hammond
- Paul Winchell as Monty
- Sheldon Allman as Quinn
- Eldon Quick as Leonard
- William Mims as Lucas Pratt
- Peter Coffield as Jimmy Simpkins
- Scott Marlowe as Ron Selleck
- Lynne Marta as Cindy
- Brenda Scott as Debbie
- Irene Tedrow as Grandma Simpkins
- Jack Dodson as Doc Russell

== Episodes ==
1. "Home is the Coward" (January 10, 1975)
2. "Treasure Chest Murder" (February 26, 1975) The murder of a visitor may be connected with a local's sudden possession of gold coins.

== Locations ==
Although supposedly set in northern California, the TV series location showed opening scenes and other outdoor shots actually taken from the southern California mountain resort communities of Big Bear Lake and Fawnskin, which were much closer to Los Angeles area television production studios.

== Later version ==
In 1977, Griffith appeared in two additional television movies (The Girl in the Empty Grave and Deadly Game), both attempts to make use again of the same concept. Griffith's character was now Chief of Police Abel Marsh, but he was still a lawman in a small town near a lake. Both movies were filmed in Big Bear Lake, California. These movies, as well as Adams of Eagle Lake and Isn't It Shocking? (1973) before it, were based on writer Lane Slate's 1972 feature film They Only Kill Their Masters
