= Joe De Santis =

American actor (1909–1989)

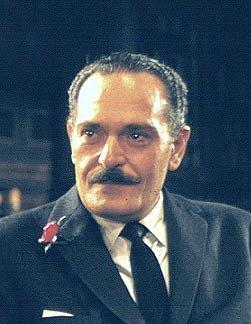
- Joseph V. De Santis (1950s)
- Born: Joseph Vito Marcello De Santis; June 15, 1909; New York City, U.S.
- Died: August 30, 1989 (aged 80); Provo, Utah, U.S.
- Occupations: Radio, stage, film, and television actor
- Years active: 1933–1977
- Spouse(s): Miriam Moss (m. 1935; div. 19??) Margaret Draper (m. 1949; div. 1956) Wanda June Slye (m. 1959; died 1977)
- Children: 2

Joseph Vito Marcello De Santis (June 15, 1909 – August 30, 1989), known as Joe De Santis, was an American radio, television, movie and theatrical actor.

== Biography ==
Joseph Vito Marcello De Santis was born to Italian immigrant parents in New York City on June 15, 1909. His father, Pasquale De Santis, was a tailor from San Pietro Apostolo in Catanzaro, Italy; his mother, Maria Paoli, emigrated from Lucca in Tuscany and worked in a paper flower factory. He worked his way through New York University studying sculpture and drama, his first performances being in Italian.

In 1931, he debuted as a broadcaster on an Italian-language radio station. In the 1930s, when professional acting opportunities became scarce, he worked as an instructor with the Works Progress Administration. In the era of old-time radio, he was heard on Pepper Young's Family, Mr. District Attorney, The March of Time, Gang Busters, and The Kate Smith Show. One of his most important contributions to the industry was his narration of Norman Corwin's On a Note of Triumph, broadcast nationwide at the conclusion of World War II.

On May 17, 1985, De Santis was inducted into the Pacific Pioneer Broadcasters Diamond Circle. During his early years he also did numerous Italian-language broadcasts. De Santis made several contributions to "Remember Radio", a column in one of the trade publications.

With the advent of television, De Santis became known as a skilled character actor who could play convincing dialect characters, mugs, suave heavies and emotional leads. He was active in such early television series as Playhouse 90, Studio One, The Sheriff of Cochise, and he appeared regularly on the programs of Red Buttons, Martha Raye and Sid Caesar. In addition to many single performances on other series like Voyage to the Bottom of the Sea, De Santis had a recurring presence in such shows as The Untouchables, 77 Sunset Strip, Perry Mason, Mission: Impossible, and in the westerns such as Sugarfoot, Daniel Boone, Gunsmoke, Sara, and Bonanza. De Santis made three guest appearances on Perry Mason; in two of the episodes he played the murder victim: George Castle in the 1958 episode, "The Case of the Long-Legged Models", and Melvin Slater in the 1959 episode, "The Case of the Borrowed Brunette". He was also cast as Louie Parker in the 1965 episode, "The Case of the Deadly Debt".

De Santis played in numerous films; the high point of his career came in 1962 with A Cold Wind in August. He was also featured in I Want to Live! and The Brotherhood. De Santis was an active member of the Players' Club in New York City, and the Masquers' Club in Los Angeles, California.

== Death ==
De Santis died in 1989 at the age of 80 of chronic obstructive pulmonary disease.

In the liner notes to Frank Zappa's first album, Freak Out!, one finds "These People Have Contributed Materially in Many Ways to Make Our Music What it is. Please Do Not Hold it Against them". De Santis' name is listed along with many others. An explanation can be found in an interview with Carl Franzoni, a vocalist for whom the first song on that album, "Hungry Freaks, Daddy" was written. Franzoni and Zappa were acquainted with Vito Paulekas, a sculptor and dancer and the L.A. freak scene guru in the early sixties. Apparently certain movie stars, De Santis included, would come to Vito's studio to sculpt, and somehow something about Joe stuck in Zappa's mind.

== Personal life ==
In 1935, he married Miriam Moss, an actress; they had one son David and later divorced. In 1949, he married Margaret Draper, also an actress, whom he met while both were playing parts in Pepper Young's Family. They had one son, Christopher, and divorced in 1956. Afterwards, De Santis moved to California to pursue his work in television and films. In 1959, he married Wanda Slye who preceded him in death in 1977.

== Filmography ==
=== Film ===
Year	Title	Role	Notes
1949	Slattery's Hurricane	Mr. Gregory	
1951	The Man with a Cloak	Joseph Martin	
1952	Deadline – U.S.A.	Herman Schmidt	
1956	The Last Hunt	Ed Black	
1956	Tension at Table Rock	Ed Burrows	
1956	Full of Life	Father Gondolfo	
1957	Dino	Mr. Minetta	
1957	Jeanne Eagels	Frank Satori	
1957	The Unholy Wife	Gino Verdugo	
1958	The Case Against Brooklyn	Gus Polumbo	Uncredited
1958	Buchanan Rides Alone	Esteban Gomez	
1958	I Want to Live!	Al Matthews	
1959	Al Capone	Big Jim Colosimo	
1959	Cry Tough	Juan Antonio Hernando Cortez	
1959	The Flying Fontaines	Roberto Rias	
1961	A Cold Wind in August	Papa Pellegrino	
1961	The George Raft Story	Frankie Donatella	
1966	Madame X	Carter	
1966	And Now Miguel	Padre de Chavez	
1966	An American Dream	Eddie Ganucci	
1966	Beau Geste	Major Beaujolais	
1966	The Professionals	Ortega	
1967	The Venetian Affair	Jan Aarvan	
1968	Blue	Carlos	
1968	Chubasco	Benito Tosoni	
1968	The Brotherhood	Pietro Rizzi	
1973	Little Cigars	Travers	
1987	How Rare a Possession	Leaders, Council of Peace	

=== Television ===
Year	Title	Role	Notes
1949	Photocrime		
1949	The Big Story	John Taine	Episode: "Andrew J. Viglietta of the Long Island Star Journal"
1950	The Trap	Host and narrator	
1950	Tom Corbett, Space Cadet	Commander Elblas	2 episodes
1951	Casey, Crime Photographer		Episode: "The Clean-Up"
1952	Lights Out		Episode: "Man in the Dark"
1952–1955	Lux Video Theatre	Sylvio / Anton Maxuranic / Wylie	3 episodes
1953	Goodyear Television Playhouse		2 episodes
1953	Four Star Playhouse		Episode: "The Hard Way"
1953–1956	The Philco Television Playhouse	Director	2 episodes
1954	Inner Sanctum	Rick / Dan / Ben Compos	3 episodes
1954	The Motorola Television Hour	Turiddu	Episode: "Love Song"
1955	Casablanca		Episode: "Family Dispute"
1955–1957	Matinee Theatre		2 episodes
1955–1960	The United States Steel Hour	Mr. Albright / Ramirez / Papa	4 episodes
1955–1968	Gunsmoke	Hoxy / Sheriff Mark Handlin / Gunter / Mr. Hawtree	4 episodes
1956	Crusader	Inspector Pete Ferranti	Episode: "Big Sneak"
1956	Robert Montgomery Presents		Episode: "Don't Do Me Any Favors"
1957	Fireside Theatre	Captain Garcia	Episode: "Harbor Patrol"
1957	The Sheriff of Cochise	Jack Sanford / Nick	2 episodes
1957	The O. Henry Playhouse		Episode: "Only a Horse Would Know"
1957	The Alcoa Hour	Dr. Hartman	Episode: "Hostages to Fortune"
1957	Dick Powell's Zane Grey Theatre	Balam	Episode: "The Deserters"
1957	Meet McGraw	Arnie Francisco	Episode: "The Fighter"
1957	General Electric Theater	Joe Breed	Episode: "Thousand Dollar Gun"
1957	The Walter Winchell File	Frankie Genetti	Episode: "The Fallen Idol"
1957	Casey Jones	Clyde Buchanan	Episode: "Run to Deadwood"
1957–1958	Playhouse 90	Charles Fischetti / Dr. Max Bronstein / Maurice Remy	3 episodes
1957–1959	Tales of Wells Fargo	Thomas / Garrett	2 episodes
1958	Have Gun – Will Travel	Clint Bryant	Episode: "The Bostonian"
1958	The Court of Last Resort	Juan Morales	Episode: "The Mary Morales Case"
1958	Schlitz Playhouse		Episode: "Lottery for Revenge"
1958	Tombstone Territory	Commandante Nexor	Episode: "Legacy of Death"
1958	Wanted: Dead or Alive	Luis Portilla	Episode: "Dead End"
1958–1960	Westinghouse Desilu Playhouse	Felix Lo Scalzo / Father Izgievdio	2 episodes
1958–1965	Perry Mason	Louie Parker / Melvin Slater / George Castle	3 episodes
1959	The Third Man	Paolo	Episode: "Listen for the Sound of a Witch"
1959	Alfred Hitchcock Presents	Police Lieutenant	Season 4 Episode 30: "A Night with the Boys"
1959	Doctor Mike	Alex Bartos	Television film
1959	Adventure Showcase	Mac Ustich	Episode: "Johnny Nighthawk"
1959	The Adventures of Hiram Holliday	Acosta	Episode: "Pasto Duro"
1959	Philip Marlowe	Roentgen	Episode: "Child of Virtue"
1959	The Man from Blackhawk	Fidelio Pirozzi	Episode: "Vendetta for the Lovelorn"
1959–1960	Rawhide	Ellis Crowley / Jed Bates / Justice Cardin	3 episodes
1959–1960	Sugarfoot	Gherardo Fregoso / General Carlos Jose Perez	2 episodes
1959–1960	Cheyenne	Manuel Loza / Manuel Lagrone	2 episodes
1959–1963	77 Sunset Strip	Senor Valdez / Mr. Costa / Hidalgo / General Gutierrez / Milton Garvey / Mustafa Caleb / Colonel José Vargas	8 episodes
1959–1963	The Untouchables	Louis Latito / Janos 'Jake' Szabo / Victor Salazar / Daniel Oates	5 episodes
1960	Law of the Plainsman	Cooper	Episode: "The Rawhiders"
1960	Tightrope!	Leo Madden	Episode: "Gangster's Daughter"
1960	Alcoa Theatre	Mac Ustich	Episode: "Forced Landing"
1960	Sea Hunt	Dr. Ruiz	Episode: "The Cellini Vase"
1960	Bourbon Street Beat	Major Hernandez	Episode: "Green Hell"
1960	The Chevy Mystery Show	Paul Otis	Episode: "Femme Fatale"
1960	Riverboat	Juan Cortilla	Episode: "Chicota Landing"
1960	Unsolved	Mr. Baroni	Television film
1960	This Man Dawson		Episode: "Sweet Charity"
1960–1961	Surfside 6	Emilio Mendez / Silva	2 episodes
1961	Maverick	Don Manuel Lozaro	Episode: "A State of Siege"
1961	The Roaring 20's	Nick Zarvis	Episode: "Dance Marathon"
1961	The Case of the Dangerous Robin		Episode: "The Strad"
1961	The Barbara Stanwyck Show	Paul Fielding	Episode: "Size 10"
1961	Hong Kong	Hernandez	Episode: "The Innocent Exile"
1961	The Tall Man	Waco	Episode: "Death or Taxes"
1961	The Detectives	Vince	Episode: "The Legend of Jim Riva"
1961	Naked City	Matt Valentine	Episode: "The Corpse Ran Down Mulberry Street"
1961–1970	Bonanza	Padre Xavier / Dr. Isaac Dawson / Samuel Michelson / Morehouse	4 episodes
1962	Thriller	Colonel Sangriento	Episode: "The Bride Who Died Twice"
1962	Route 66	Rudy Steiner	Episode: "A Feat of Strength"
1962	Checkmate	Joe Angelo	Episode: "Down the Gardenia Path"
1962	Kraft Mystery Theatre	Felix La Scalzo	Episode: "Circle of Evil"
1962	The Eleventh Hour	Mr. Radwin	Episode: "Eat Little Fishie Eat"
1962–1963	Sam Benedict	Judge Anthony Parrelli / Judge Murvill	3 episodes
1963	Hawaiian Eye	Akao	Episode: "Maybe Menehunes"
1963	The Dick Powell Show	Joe Austin	Episode: "Apples Don't Fall Far"
1963	Car 54, Where Are You?	Billson	Episode: "The Loves of Sylvia Schnauser"
1963	The Defenders	The District Attorney	Episode: "Judgment Eve"
1963	The Outer Limits	Colonel William Campbell	Episode: "The Human Factor"
1963	Arrest and Trial	Mr. Ware	Episode: "The Quality of Justice"
1963	Ripcord	Louis Santee	Episode: "Flight to Terror"
1963–1965	The Virginian	Juan Pablo / General Rodello	2 episodes
1963–1965	The Doctors and the Nurses	Mr. Cestano / Robertson	2 episodes
1964	Bob Hope Presents the Chrysler Theatre	Albert Ortega	Episode: "A Wind of Hurricane Force"
1964	Temple Houston		Episode: "A Slight Case of Larceny"
1964	East Side/West Side	Ralph Morelli	Episode: "Don't Grow Old"
1964	The Great Adventure	General Vallejo	Episode: "The Pathfinder"
1964	Wagon Train	Samuel Moses	Episode: "The Last Circle Up"
1964	Mr. Novak	Dr. Wolifski	Episode: "Moonlighting"
1964	Kraft Suspense Theatre	Mr. Aviles	Episode: "That He Should Weep for Her"
1964	The Fugitive	Vardez	Episode: "The Cage"
1964–1966	Dr. Kildare	Bruno Rossi / Enrico Conti	3 episodes
1965	Voyage to the Bottom of the Sea	Miklos	Episode: "The Last Battle"
1965	Daniel Boone	Jigossassee	Episode: "The Prophet"
1965	Branded	Chief Looking Glass	Episode: "The Test"
1965	Ben Casey	Charlie Hoffman	Episode: "Minus That Rusty Old Hacksaw"
1965	The Alfred Hitchcock Hour	Jake Martinez	Season 3 Episode 28: "Night Fever"
1965	The Lucy Show	Headwaiter	Episode: "Lucy and the Golden Greek"
1965	The Munsters	Lou	Episode: "Herman Munster, Shutterbug"
1966	Laredo	Don Miguel	Episode: "The Would-Be Gentleman of Laredo"
1966	Twelve O'Clock High	'Elmer' Delvecchio	Episode: "Face of a Shadow"
1966	The Man Who Never Was	Davos	Episode: "In Memory of Davos"
1967	The Road West	Octaviano	Episode: "A War for the Gravediggers"
1967	Run for Your Life	Eduardo Alonzo	Episode: "The Naked Half-Truth"
1967–1970	Mission: Impossible	Jorge Cabal / Major Marak / Vito Scalisi	3 episodes
1968	Lancer	Doc Hildenbrand	Episode: "The Escape"
1968–1971	The Name of the Game	Don Ignazio / Ricci	2 episodes
1969	The Doris Day Show	Frank Gorian	Episode: "The Date"
1969	Hawaii Five-O	Professor Akbar Savang	Episode: "Leopard on the Rock"
1970	The Bold Ones: The Lawyers	Don Passetto	Episode: "Trial of a Mafioso"
1970	The Flying Nun	Antonio Novello	Episode: "The Somnaviatrix"
1970	The High Chaparral	Colonel Ruiz	Episode: "A Good Sound Profit"
1970	Dan August	Jeff Zachary	Episode: "The Union Forever"
1971	Bearcats!	Colonel Delgado	Episode: "Powderkeg"
1971	Sarge	Vito	Episode: "Ring Out, Ring It"
1972	Mannix	Sam Maturian	Episode: "Harvest of Death"
1973	Honor Thy Father	Joe Magliocco	Television film
1973	The New Dick Van Dyke Show	Carlo	Episode: "Preston al Naturale"
1973	Toma		Episode: "Frame-Up"
1974	It's Good to Be Alive	Roy Campanella's Father	Television film
1975	Cannon	Benito Conforte	Episode: "Nightmare"
1975	Katherine	Father Echeverra	Television film
1976	Sara	Vittori	Episode: "Man from Leadville"
1977	Contract on Cherry Street	Vincenzo Seruto	Television film
1985	Suburban Beat	Sylvester Linus	Television film
