= Douglas Milsome =

English cinematographer

Douglas Milsome BSC, ASC (born 1939) is an English cinematographer.

A former camera operator for John Alcott on films like A Clockwork Orange, Barry Lyndon, and The Shining, Milsome worked on Stanley Kubrick's Full Metal Jacket, following Alcott's death in 1986.

== Biography ==
Milsome was born in Hammersmith, London, England, in 1939.

Sometimes credited as Doug Milsome, perhaps his most-widely seen work is Robin Hood: Prince of Thieves. He collaborated with Stanley Kubrick and John Alcott in the 1970s, as camera operator and second-unit photographer, and became Kubrick's director of photography for Full Metal Jacket. Known for his mastery of difficult focus techniques, tested especially with the idiosyncratic lenses used on Barry Lyndon to film scenes by candlelight, he was consulted for Kubrick's final project, Eyes Wide Shut.

Milsome has gravitated toward genres such as science fiction and fantasy, where he is known for his brooding style. He is member of both the American and British Societies of Cinematographers.

His son, Mark Milsome (1963–2017), was also a camera operator, and was killed during a shoot. At the inquest, the coroner ruled it an "accidental death".

== Filmography ==
=== Film ===
Year	Title	Director	Notes
1983	Wild Horses	Derek Morton	
1987	Full Metal Jacket	Stanley Kubrick	
1988	Hawks	Robert Ellis Miller	
1989	The Beast of War	Kevin Reynolds	aka The Beast
1990	Desperate Hours	Michael Cimino	
1991	If Looks Could Kill	William Dear	
1991	Robin Hood: Prince of Thieves	Kevin Reynolds	
1993	Body of Evidence	Uli Edel	
1993	Sunset Grill	Kevin Connor	
1995	Rumpelstiltskin	Mark Jones	
1996	The Sunchaser	Michael Cimino	
1997	Breakdown	Jonathan Mostow	
1998	Legionnaire	Peter MacDonald	
2000	Highlander: Endgame	Doug Aarniokoski	
2000	Dungeons & Dragons	Courtney Solomon	
2002	Ritual	Avi Nesher	
2006	The Legend of Simon Conjurer	Stuart Paul	With Howard Atherton
2007	Until Death	Simon Fellows	
2010	Frenchy	Jean-Claude Van Damme	
2017	Bitter Harvest	George Mendeluk	
2018	The Ghost	Garrick L. Hamm	Short film
2019	Eve	Rory Kindersley	
2022	Kingslayer	Stuart Brennan	
2022	House Red	Coz Greenop	
2023	1066	Robin Jacob	
2024	Warchief	Stuart Brennan	
2024	Assassin's Guild	Stuart Brennan	

Direct-to-video

Year	Title	Director	Notes
1998	Sinbad: The Battle of the Dark Knights	Alan Mehrez	With Mark Woods
2003	Dracula II: Ascension	Patrick Lussier	
2005	Dracula III: Legacy	Patrick Lussier	
2006	The Hard Corps	Sheldon Lettich	
2006	Second in Command	Simon Fellows	
2008	The Shepherd: Border Patrol	Isaac Florentine	

Documentary film

Year	Title	Director	Note
2002	Standing in the Shadows of Motown	Paul Justman	With Lon Stratton

=== Television ===
Year	Title	Director	Notes
1988	The Dirty Dozen	Kevin Connor; Douglas Hickox	3 episodes
2021	Wrongfully Convicted	John Wolfe	

Miniseries

Year	Title	Director
1989	Lonesome Dove	Simon Wincer
1991	Great Expectations	Kevin Connor
1990	Family of Spies	Stephen Gyllenhaal
2002	Johnson County War	David S. Cass Sr.

TV movies

Year	Title	Director
1989	The Hollywood Detective	Kevin Connor
1991	Diana: Her True Story	Kevin Connor
1993	Spies	Kevin Connor
1994	Seasons of the Heart	Lee Grant
1994	Following Her Heart	Lee Grant
1995	Hart to Hart: Secrets of the Hart	Kevin Connor
1995	The Old Curiosity Shop	Kevin Connor
1995	Liz: The Elizabeth Taylor Story	Kevin Connor
1998	Glory & Honor	Kevin Hooks
2002	Santa, Jr.	Kevin Connor
