= It Crawled Out of the Woodwork =

- The Outer Limits episode
- Episode no.: Season 1 Episode 11
- Directed by: Gerd Oswald
- Written by: Joseph Stefano
- Cinematography by: Conrad Hall
- Production code: 18
- Original air date: December 9, 1963

Guest appearances
- Scott Marlowe; Kent Smith; Barbara Luna; Michael Forest; Joan Camden; Edward Asner

Episode chronology
← Previous "Nightmare"	Next → "The Borderland"

"It Crawled Out of the Woodwork" is an episode of the original The Outer Limits television show. It first aired on December 9, 1963, during the first season.

== Introduction ==
A cleaning lady attempts to vacuum up what appears to be a dust-bunny, but as soon as it is in the vacuum cleaner it explodes into a bizarre energy cloud and kills her.

== Opening narration ==
His name is Warren Edgar Morley. For the past six months, he has guarded this gate from eight in the morning until six at night, at which time he is replaced by another just like himself. These are the last few moments of his life.

== Plot ==
A security guard at the gates of NORCO, a southern California physics research center, is brusque when the Peters brothers drive up, even though Professor Stuart Peters has taken a job with the company, intending to have a look around the property. The guard orders them to leave, when oddly enough, he slips them a matchbook on which he has scrawled, "Don't come back, NORCO doomed". When the brothers drive away, a monstrous explosion of energy appears, and the guard, while pleading for his life, disintegrates.

The next day at NORCO, Professor Peters meets his boss, head scientist Dr. Block, and mentions the note, which Block dismisses. Block leaves Stuart in the laboratory with a co-worker, Professor Stephanie Linden. Inquiring as to the nature of their work, Linden directs Stuart into an adjacent corridor and then locks him in, releasing a grotesque energy entity that kills him instantly.

Days pass, and when Stuart does not return, his brother, Jory, grows worried, while confiding his concerns to his girlfriend, Gaby. However, when Stuart reappears, the two men quarrel over a family matter as Jory notices a strange device, apparently a heart pacemaker, strapped around his brother's chest. Stuart stumbles backward into the bathtub, where he is electrocuted. The pacemaker was thought to be defective by the authorities, but Peters had perfect health and the scar tissue is recent enough for a heart operation to have taken place since he arrived in California.

The police investigate, and Sgt. Siroleo confronts Block at NORCO, who feigns ignorance to any wrongdoings at his facility and denies the allegations of complicity. However, it is Linden who reveals the truth: A being composed entirely of energy has been accidentally formed. It can consume anyone with a mere touch, and is so threatening that those who encounter it at close range die instantly. Dr. Block found a way to control the entity, and is keeping it contained while he tries to study the monster. When the other scientists demanded its destruction, Block had the horrid being frighten them to death, and then restored them to life with pacemakers, which will cease to function if Block directs the creature to draw the power from them.

Jory arrives at the center in an effort to find the truth about what actually happened to his brother. Dr. Block then reappears in the laboratory with a gun and, holding Siroleo and Linden at bay, releases the horror. Siroleo, however, wrests away the gun and Linden shoots Block. Now he, Linden, and Peters must face the energy being. Since the creature needs energy to sustain itself, they resort to cutting all power within a large area, thus forcing the being to withdraw back into the energy chamber where it has been contained. Unfortunately, this also causes Dr. Linden's pacemaker to fail, thus killing her.

As things settle down, Peters and Siroleo turn around to look with uncertainty towards the energy chamber where the being has been quarantined — now, once again, contained, but still powerful and alive.

== Closing narration ==
The Conservation of Energy Law — a principle which states that energy can be changed in form but that it cannot be either created or destroyed. And this is true of all energy — the energy of genius, of madness, of the heart, of the atom. And so it must be lived with. It must be controlled, channeled for good, held isolated from evil… and somehow lived with, peaceably.

== Cast ==
- Scott Marlowe — as Jory Peters
- Michael Forest — as Stuart Peters
- Barbara Luna — as Gaby Christian
- Kent Smith — as Dr. Block
- Edward Asner — as Sgt. Siroleo
- Joan Camden — as Dr. Stephanie Linden
- Tom Palmer — as Coroner
- Ted de Corsia — as New Sentry
- Gene Darfler — as Warren Edgar Morley
- Robert Johnson — as NORCO Intercom Voice
