= Five Weeks in a Balloon (film) =

1962 film by Irwin Allen

- Original film poster
- Directed by: Irwin Allen
- Screenplay by: Irwin Allen; Charles Bennett
- Based on: Five Weeks in a Balloon by Jules Verne
- Produced by: Irwin Allen
- Starring: Red Buttons; Fabian; Barbara Eden; Cedric Hardwicke; Peter Lorre; Richard Haydn; Barbara Luna; Billy Gilbert; Herbert Marshall; Reginald Owen; Henry Daniell; Mike Mazurki; Alan Caillou; Ben Astar; Raymond Bailey; Chester the Chimp
- Cinematography: Winton Hoch, ASC
- Edited by: George Boemler
- Music by: Paul Sawtell
- Production company: Cambridge Productions
- Distributed by: Twentieth Century-Fox Film Corporation
- Release date: August 22, 1962
- Running time: 101 minutes
- Country: United States
- Language: English
- Budget: $2,365,000
- Box office: $1.2 million

Five Weeks in a Balloon is a 1962 American adventure film loosely based on the 1863 novel of the same name by Jules Verne filmed in CinemaScope. It was produced and directed by Irwin Allen; his last feature film in the 1960s before moving to producing several science fiction television series. Although set in Africa, it was filmed in California. Balloonist Don Piccard acted as the film's technical advisor. For visual effects, a model of the balloon was used as well as a full-sized unicorn gondola hung from a crane. A novelisation of the screenplay was written by Gardner Fox.

== Plot ==
It is 1862 in England. The Jupiter, a manned balloon with a unicorn-shaped gondola, falls from the sky during its maiden flight. Passenger Sir Henry Vining (Richard Haydn) and his treasurer (Ronald Long) scream in horror. However, Professor Fergusson (Cedric Hardwicke), the balloon's inventor, remains calm, as he planned on giving a dramatic demonstration showing the balloon's controls. On his signal, Canadian pilot Jacques (Fabian), ascends the balloon using a pressure gauge that ensures no loss of gas or ballast. Traumatized by their "near-disaster", Sir Henry, head of the Royal Geographic Society, and his treasurer refuse to fund Jupiter's exploration of East Africa, and walk out on the professor after landing. American publisher Cornelius Randolph comes to the rescue: he will back the venture if his star reporter and nephew, Donald O'Shay (Red Buttons), joins the crew. Unbeknownst to the professor, who is told by Randolph that O'Shay is an "inoffensive young man", O'Shay is notorious in the press for his troublesome antics as a playboy.

On the day Fergusson intends to set sail for Africa, he learns that his expedition is halted and that plans have been changed. At the British Parliament, the prime minister commissions Fergusson to defeat a convoy of slave traders heading toward uncharted land near the Volta River in West Africa. The slavers aim to stake their claim within six weeks and take over the territory. Fergusson calculates he needs only five weeks to cross Africa by air and plant the British flag at the river. The Prime Minister recommends that he take O'Shay along as a neutral witness to the planting of their flag. However, he did not calculate the Queen sending along Sir Henry, who proclaims himself to be the "expert on Africa" and demands to be called the "General".

While Fergusson meets with the British Consul in Zanzibar, Jacques spots O'Shay helping to free slave girl Makia (Barbara Luna), fighting off traders and disrupting her sale. When local authorities order them to return her to her owner, Makia escapes. Angry merchants mob them, but the group is reunited, and the balloon takes off just in time. Landing in a jungle, they learn Makia stowed away to join them, they also adopt a wild chimpanzee called "The Duchess".

The following day, the balloon sets down in the Arab city of Hezak, causing a panic. A Muslim priest proclaims that O'Shay is the Moon God and the balloon is the moon, making them instant celebrities. They dine with the Sultan in his palace. There, Ahmed, a slave trader (Peter Lorre), enters, offering for sale a kidnapped American teacher, Susan Gale (Barbara Eden). The moon emerges from the horizon, showing the Sultan (Billy Gilbert) they are not gods, but mortals. The crew flee to their ship, taking the American. As it launches, Ahmed clambers in, becoming their comic foil.

As they encounter mishaps throughout the journey, O'Shay is often held accountable. They blame him for putting the balloon in the path of attacking natives, and releasing its anchor, causing it to drift away. Finally, the crew considers whether they need two American witnesses for their expedition. Finding Susan to be less troublesome, they decide to hand O'Shay over to passing Arab nomads. However, as they descend, O'Shay spots a sandstorm, forcing them to immediately reverse their course.

Near Timbuktu, the balloon lands in an oasis and several of them attempt to gather food and supplies. They are discovered and captured by a mounted patrol of the Sheik of Timbuktu, but O'Shay, Jacques and Ahmed hide and escape in the balloon, which is feared by the patrol. In Timbuktu, Fergusson, Susan, and the General are imprisoned as infidels, and set to be thrown from the highest tower, while Makia is put up for sale. Jacques, Ahmed and O'Shay, in disguise, purchase Makia from a slave trader (also played by Billy Gilbert). Makia warns them of the scheduled executions. The heroes fly the Jupiter to the tower, fight off a horde of swordsmen and save the others. However, as they take to the sky, one swordsman launches a scimitar that pierces the balloon and it begins to slowly leak. Aboard the gondola, the Professor calculates that with this handicap, they will never beat the slave traders. Both they and the slavers are now neck and neck, only two days away from the Volta River, where they can stake their flag to claim the territory. O'Shay convinces the Professor that they can gain the advantage if they fly through the night.

They reach the Volta River first, but the scimitar rips from the balloon and causes it to descend until they empty out all the cargo. As the balloon approaches a bridge, the crew spot the slave traders, who shoot at their balloon. To gain lift and destroy the bridge with the balloon's anchor, they climb into its crow's nest and release the balloon's gondola. This wipes out most of the slave traders, but not their leader, who continues attacking. The balloon finally hits the water close to where the river flows into an enormous waterfall. The group swims for shore, except Ahmed, who cannot swim and rides the balloon as a raft, and O'Shay, who swims back to get their flag. Both men ride down the waterfall, after which Ahmed tells O'Shay to jump to safety with their flag. Ahmed then kills the slave trade leader with a dagger to his heart. O'Shay delivers the flag and wins back the respect of the crew. Finally, Sir Henry admits to the Professor he was wrong in doubting him. The others embrace: Jacques and Makia, Susan and O'Shay, and even Duchess, with a newfound chimpanzee friend.

== Cast ==
- Red Buttons as Donald O'Shay
- Fabian as Jacques
- Barbara Eden as Susan Gale
- Cedric Hardwicke as Fergusson
- Peter Lorre as Ahmed
- Richard Haydn as Sir Henry Vining
- BarBara Luna as Makia
- Billy Gilbert as Sultan
- Herbert Marshall as The Prime Minister
- Reginald Owen as Consul
- Henry Daniell as Sheik Ageiba
- Mike Mazurki as Slave Captain
- Alan Caillou as Inspector
- Raymond Bailey as Randolph
- Ben Astar as Myanga
- Chester the Chimp as "The Duchess"

== Production ==
In 1955, Tony Curtis announced plans to produce and star in a version of the novel for his own company, Curtleigh, and hired Kathleen Dormer to write a script. He wanted the treatment to be comic and to co-star with Alec Guinness. The film was not made.

In 1956 it was reported a British company wanted to film the novel starring Robert Ryan. This film was not made either.

20th Century Fox had a big hit with Journey to the Centre of the Earth (1959), based on a Verne novel, and made plans for two similar follow ups, The Lost World (1960), based on the novel by Arthur Conan Doyle, and Five Weeks in a Balloon.

In June 1961, Irwin Allen, who had made The Lost World announced he had secured rights to the novel after six years of negotiation and would likely make the film at 20th Century Fox. The book was mostly in the public domain but was still in copyright in some countries. Allen wanted to release the film in 1962 in time for the one hundredth anniversary of the novel. In June 1961 Allen announced he had signed a multi-picture deal with Fox of which Balloon would be the first and Passage to the End of Space, an Allen original, would be the second.

Cedric Hardwicke, who had just enjoyed a Broadway success in A Majority of One, was cast in the lead. Fabian, who had a long-term contract with Fox, signed to play a support role. Another key role went to Red Buttons who, like Fabian, had just been in Fox's The Longest Day (1962).

There was a race between two producers attempting to be the first to film the story: Allen and the Woolner Brothers, who made Flight of the Lost Balloon (1961) directed by Nathan Juran. Though Verne's novel was in the public domain, Fox and Allen brought legal pressure against the Woolners to drop all mention of Jules Verne from their film. The Woolner's were also stopped from using another title for the film - Cleopatra and the Cyclops, intended to exploit the hype of Fox's own Cleopatra (1963). Allen's film is played much more for comedy than Juran's film.

In Verne's novel and the Woolner Brothers' film, the balloon was named the Victoria. Allen's film renames it the Jupiter with Allen giving the name Jupiter II to the spaceship on Lost in Space.

Filming took place in early 1962. It was the only film being made on the Fox lot at the time, due to costs incurred by Cleopatra (1963).

The film was entirely shot in Hollywood except for some second unit shots in Africa.

Allen wanted to make the film as a straight adventure movie with accent on comedy and youthful romance. He did this to attract teenage girls and mature women who might not normally go to an adventure film. Buttons and Barbara Eden were to take care of comedy and romance, Fabian was for the teenagers. It was Billy Gilbert's first film since suffering a stroke that almost killed him.

== Reception ==
The Los Angeles Times said "children will enjoy it but adults will find the whimsy heavy and repetitious."

Variety called it "unstable but entertaining."

== See also ==
- List of American films of 1962
