= Robert Arthur (actor) =

American actor (1925–2008)

- Publicity Photo of Robert Arthur
- Born: Robert Paul Arthaud; June 18, 1925; Aberdeen, Washington, U.S.
- Died: October 1, 2008 (aged 83); Aberdeen, Washington, U.S.
- Years active: 1945-1995

Robert Paul Arthur (born Robert Paul Arthaud; June 18, 1925 – October 1, 2008) was an American motion picture actor who appeared in dozens of films in the 1940s and 1950s.

== Biography ==
After working in radio and serving in the Navy during World War II, Arthur moved to Hollywood, where his first role was as Rosalind Russell's son in Roughly Speaking in 1945. He soon was signed to a studio contract with Warners and appeared in films including Too Young to Know, Night and Day and Nora Prentiss. He also appeared in the 1949 war film Twelve O'Clock High, the 1951 Billy Wilder film Ace in the Hole, and in the 1950s television program The Lone Ranger.

== Personal life ==
Arthur supported Barry Goldwater in the 1964 United States presidential election.

In his later years, Arthur became an activist for gay rights on behalf of senior citizens, and was involved with the Log Cabin Republicans.

Robert Arthur died in Aberdeen, Washington, on October 1, 2008, from heart failure, aged 83.

== Partial filmography ==
- Roughly Speaking (1945) - Frankie at 17
- Mildred Pierce (1945) - High School Boy (uncredited)
- Danger Signal (1945) - Hotel Boy (uncredited)
- Too Young to Know (1945) - Jimmy
- Her Kind of Man (1946) - Copy Boy (uncredited)
- Night and Day (1946) - Customer (uncredited)
- Nobody Lives Forever (1946) - Bellhop (uncredited)
- Sweetheart of Sigma Chi (1946) - Harry Townsend
- Nora Prentiss (1947) - Gregory Talbot
- The Devil on Wheels (1947) - Todd Powell
- Mother Wore Tights (1947) - Bob Clarkman
- Green Grass of Wyoming (1948) - Ken McLaughlin
- Yellow Sky (1948) - Bull Run
- Mother Is a Freshman (1949) - Beaumont Jackson
- You're My Everything (1949) - Harold - College Boy in "Heart of a Co-Ed"
- Twelve O'Clock High (1949) - Sgt. McIllhenny
- September Affair (1950) - David Lawrence Jr
- Air Cadet (1951) - Walt Carver
- Ace in the Hole (1951) - Herbie Cook
- On the Loose (1951) - Larry Lindsay
- Belles on Their Toes (1952) - Frank Gilbreth Jr.
- The Ring (1952) - Billy Smith
- Just For You (1952) - Jerry Blake
- The System (1953) - Rex Merrick
- Young Bess (1953) - Barnaby
- Take the High Ground! (1953) - Donald Quentin Dover IV
- Return from the Sea (1954) - Porter
- Top of the World (1955) - Lt. Skip McGuire
- The Desperados Are in Town (1956) - Lonny Kesh
- Three Violent People (1956) - One-Legged Confederate Soldier (uncredited)
- Hellcats of the Navy (1957) - Freddy Warren
- Young and Wild (1958) - Jerry Coltrin
- Wild Youth (1960) - Frankie
