= Riot in Juvenile Prison =

1959 film by Edward L. Cahn

- Theatrical release poster
- Directed by: Edward L. Cahn
- Written by: Orville H. Hampton
- Produced by: Robert Kent
- Starring: Jerome Thor; Scott Marlowe; Marcia Henderson; Dorothy Provine
- Cinematography: Maury Gertsman
- Edited by: Edward Mann
- Music by: Emil Newman
- Production company: Vogue Pictures
- Distributed by: United Artists
- Release date: April 1959
- Running time: 71 minutes
- Country: United States
- Language: English

Riot in Juvenile Prison is a 1959 film directed by Edward L. Cahn and starring Jerome Thor and Scott Marlowe.

== Plot ==
A radical plan is enacted when Dr. Paul Furman is assigned by the governor to take charge of a youth reformatory, replacing Colonel Walton, with a notion to offer inmates more trust. Not only does Furman ease the institution's usual strict discipline, he changes it from an all-boy detention facility to co-ed.

Juvenile delinquent Eddie Bassett observes with interest as new female inmates like Kitty and Babe arrive along with adult supervisors Grace Hartwell and Bess Monahan, who will look after the girls. As soon as the bashful Kitty expresses an interest in Eddie, the extroverted Babe causes trouble for her, causing Kitty to be injured in a fight and later attacked by another boy. Furman is also physically assaulted by Eddie.

Various misdeeds lead to the governor's firing Furman and restoring Walton and the previous routine of discipline. Eddie, beaten by a guard named Quillan, steals the guard's gun, knocks him out and leads a revolt. The only one able to quell the uprising is Furman, who, with Kitty's help, successfully appeals to Eddie to give up before it's too late.

== Cast ==
- Jerome Thor as Paul A. Furman
- Scott Marlowe as Eddie Bassett
- Marcia Henderson as Grace Hartwell
- Dorothy Provine as Babe
- John Hoyt as Col. Ernest Walton
- Ann Doran as Bess Monahan
- Virginia Aldridge as Kitty Anderson
- Richard Tyler as Stu Killion (as Dick Tyler)
- Richard Reeves as Quillan

== See also ==
- List of American films of 1959
