= Night Slaves =

- Based on: Night Slaves by Jerry Sohl
- Written by: Everett Chambers; Robert Specht
- Directed by: Ted Post
- Starring: James Franciscus; Lee Grant; Scott Marlowe; Andrew Prine; Leslie Nielsen
- Music by: Bernardo Segall
- Country of origin: United States
- Original language: English

Production
- Producer: Everett Chambers
- Production company: Bing Crosby Productions

Original release
- Network: ABC
- Release: September 29, 1970

Night Slaves is a 1970 American television science fiction horror film directed by Ted Post and starring James Franciscus and Lee Grant. It was based on a 1965 novel by science fiction writer Jerry Sohl, best known for writing episodes of The Outer Limits, Star Trek, Alfred Hitchcock Presents and as ghostwriter for Charles Beaumont on three episodes of The Twilight Zone. Night Slaves aired as part of the ABC Network's Movie of the Week series.

== Plot ==
Clay and Marjorie, an estranged married couple, take a vacation together while Clay recuperates from a serious auto accident. They end up in a sleepy little town which seems to be normal, except at night when the townspeople begin acting strangely and leave town in trucks, always returning by morning. Marjorie also begins to act strangely, and no one has any memories of their nighttime activities. Only Clay is unaffected due to the presence of a metal plate in his head, and no one believes his story.

== Cast ==
- James Franciscus as Clay Howard
- Lee Grant as Marjorie Howard
- Scott Marlowe as Matt Russell
- Andrew Prine as Fess Beany / Noel
- Tisha Sterling as Annie Fletcher / Naillil
- Leslie Nielsen as Sheriff Henshaw
- Morris Buchanan as Mr. Hale
- John Kellogg as Mr. Fletcher

== Production ==
The TV movie features the debut of actress Sharon Gless. The teleplay was co-written by Robert Specht who had contributed to the TV series The Outer Limits and The Immortal.

Sohl noted that he was "very pleased with the whole thing...as a matter of fact, it interested me. They did a marvelous job."

Ted Post had directed Franciscus the year before on Beneath the Planet of the Apes and had high regard for Franciscus as an actor. Post worked as a director on TV series, TV movies and theatrical films but brought more than the usual "director-for-hire" ethos, often seeking to improve scripts or refine actors' performances to meet the needs of the material.

== Release ==
The film originally aired on September 29, 1970, on American Broadcasting Company.

== Reception ==
Reviewing the film in the present day, Brian Schuck wrote:

Night Slaves sets up a spooky atmosphere in its first half, but mitigates it to an extent with a soap-opera-ish love triangle involving Clay, Marjorie and the crazy girl. And then there’s the reveal that comes way too early in the film, further dissipating the suspense.

But don’t let that deter you too much. Night Slaves' plot is sneakily subversive, especially considering that it was broadcast at the height of Cesar Chavez's national fame leading the United Farm Workers on behalf of exploited migrant workers. In that context, Night Slaves jolts with its depiction of middle-class white people being herded onto trucks and hauled off to do some mysterious involuntary labor.

== See also ==
- List of American films of 1970
- They Came from Beyond Space
