= The Desperados Are in Town =

1956 film by Kurt Neumann

- Directed by: Kurt Neumann
- Screenplay by: Earle Snell; Kurt Neumann
- Based on: (The Outlaws Are in Town); Bennett Foster
- Produced by: Kurt Neumann
- Starring: Robert Arthur; Kathleen Nolan
- Cinematography: John J. Mescall
- Edited by: Jack Ogilvie
- Music by: Paul Sawtell; Bert Shefter
- Color process: Black and white
- Production company: Regal Films
- Distributed by: 20th Century-Fox
- Release date: November 1956 (USA)
- Running time: 73 minutes
- Country: United States
- Language: English

The Desperados Are in Town is a 1956 American Western film directed by Kurt Neumann and starring Robert Arthur and Kathleen Nolan.

It was a B movie made for the bottom half of double bills.

It was known as The Outlaws are in Town. Kurt Neumann signed to make the movie in July 1956.

== Plot ==
A farm hand from Georgia goes west to Texas, but finds the area overrun with outlaws.

== Cast ==
- Robert Arthur as Lenny Kesh
- Kathleen Nolan as Alice Rutherford (as Kathy Nolan)
- Rhys Williams as Jud Collins
- Rhodes Reason as Frank Banner
- Dave O'Brien as Dock Lapman / Mr. Brown
- Kelly Thordsen as Big Tobe Lapman
- Mae Clarke as Jane Kesh
- Robert Osterloh as Deputy Sheriff Mike Broome
- William Challee as Tom Kesh
- Carol Kelly as Hattie
- Frank Sully as Carl Branch
- Morris Ankrum as Mr. Rutherford
- Dick Wessel as Hank Green (as Richard Wessel)
- Dorothy Granger as Molly, Saloon Girl (as Dorothy Grainger)
- Tod Griffin as Ranger
- Nancy Evans as Mrs. Rutherford
- Ann Stebbins as Girl
- Byron Foulger as Jim Day

== See also ==
- List of American films of 1956

== Bibliography ==
- Quinlan, David. The Film Lover's Companion: An A to Z Guide to 2,000 Stars and the Movies They Made. Carol Publishing Group, 1997.
