= The Restless Breed =

1957 film by Allan Dwan

- Original film poster
- Directed by: Allan Dwan
- Written by: Steve Fisher
- Produced by: Edward L. Alperson; Richard Einfeld; Charles B. Fitzsimmons; Ace Herman
- Starring: Scott Brady; Anne Bancroft; Rhys Williams
- Cinematography: John W. Boyle
- Music by: Edward L. Alperson Jr.
- Distributed by: 20th Century-Fox
- Release date: May 1957
- Running time: 86 min.
- Country: United States
- Language: English

The Restless Breed is a 1957 Western film, directed by Allan Dwan and starring Scott Brady and Anne Bancroft.

== Plot ==
1865: Lawyer Mitch Baker is called into an office of the United States Secret Service to be told that his father was murdered in the border town of Mission, Texas. He had been betrayed to Newton by an informer whilst on a mission investigating a group of gunrunners called "Newton's Raiders" supplying the forces of Emperor Maximilian I of Mexico with weapons, arousing the ire of the United States, which wants a Republican Mexico.

Though offered his father's badge and pistol, Mitch only wants the pistol that he takes with him on his revenge mission to Mission. Mitch adopts the guise of a gunslinger, establishing his credentials by gunning down a few of Newton's men. With previous sheriffs having been murdered soon after taking office, the only force for good in the town is Mr Simmons, who admits to impersonating a Reverend of the Gospel. Simmons also runs a children's shelter of half breed children that neither their Indian or American fathers and mothers want. The oldest is Angelita who aspires to be a dancer in the local saloon.

Angelita is fascinated by Mitch, then falls in love with him. As no one in town know who Mitch is, or why he has come, the local children imagine him to be an Archangel, especially as Mitch turns the table on several assassination attempts as he waits for Newton to arrive to exact his revenge.

Before Newton arrives, Marshal Evans (who knew Mitch's father) comes to town. He tells Mitch that his father would be ashamed of what he was doing. He also threatens to imprison Mitch and charge him with murder if he kills one more of Newton's men. Angelita and Simons are glad to know Mitch's mission and urge him to let Marshal Evans arrest Newton, but Newton rides in with a gang of riders.

Marshal Evans attempts to arrest Newton for murder, but is shot by Newton and his gang. The marshal gives Mitch his sheriff's badge before he died, and Mitch chases Newton into the Saloon. Mitch catches Newton off-guard, and they have a showdown. Mitch shoots Newton, and kisses Angelita.

== Cast ==
- Scott Brady as Mitchell Baker - Mitch
- Anne Bancroft as Angelita
- Jay C. Flippen as Marshal Steve Evans
- Jim Davis as Ed Newton
- Rhys Williams as Rev. Simmons
- Leo Gordon as Cherokee
- Scott Marlowe as James Allan
- Eddy Waller as Caesar
- Harry Cheshire as Mayor Johnson
- Myron Healey as Sheriff Mike Williams
- Gerald Milton as Jim Daley - Bartender
- Dennis King Jr. as Hotel Clerk
- James Flavin as Secret Service Chief
- Clegg Hoyt as Spud
- Marilyn Winston as Banee
