= The Good Humor Man (1950 film) =

1950 film directed by Lloyd Bacon

- Theatrical release poster
- Directed by: Lloyd Bacon
- Written by: Frank Tashlin
- Based on: Appointment with Fear; 1946 story in The Saturday Evening Post by Roy Huggins
- Produced by: S. Sylvan Simon
- Starring: Jack Carson; Lola Albright; Jean Wallace
- Cinematography: Lester White
- Edited by: Jerome Thoms
- Music by: Heinz Roemheld
- Production company: Columbia Pictures
- Distributed by: Columbia Pictures
- Release dates: June 8, 1950 (Los Angeles); July 13, 1950 (New York)
- Running time: 80 minutes
- Country: United States
- Language: English

The Good Humor Man is a 1950 American slapstick action comedy film directed by Lloyd Bacon and written by Frank Tashlin. The plot concerns a Good Humor ice cream salesman who becomes involved in a murder. The film stars Jack Carson, Lola Albright, Jean Wallace, George Reeves, Peter Miles and Frank Ferguson. It was released on June 1, 1950, by Columbia Pictures.

Producer S. Sylvan Simon, writer Frank Tashlin and cinematographer Lester White had been involved with the production of The Fuller Brush Man (1948), another Columbia Pictures slapstick comedy with a brand name in its title.

== Plot ==
Good Humor delivery driver Biff Jones is in trouble with the law after being falsely connected with a $300,000 robbery of the cash safe at work and an apparent murder. He is in love with neighborhood gal Margie Bellew, who lives with her younger brother Johnny. Biff and Margie, with the help of Johnny and all of the neighborhood kids, absolve Biff by fighting and capturing the gangsters who committed the crimes.

== Cast ==
- Jack Carson as Biff Jones
- Lola Albright as Margie Bellew
- Jean Wallace as Bonnie Conroy
- George Reeves as Stuart Nagle
- Peter Miles as Johnny Bellew
- Frank Ferguson as Inspector Quint
- David Sharpe as Slick
- Chick Collins as Fats
- Eddie Parker as John
- Pat Flaherty as Officer Rhodes
- Richard Egan as Officer Daley
- Arthur Space as Steven
- Victoria Horne as Bride
- Jack Overman as Shirtless Stoker

== Reception ==
In a contemporary review for The New York Times, critic Bosley Crowther wrote: "Perhaps, in a rush of generosity we might dignify this little film by calling it simply an endeavor at slapstick comedy. That would be putting it kindly. for it does follow more or less the lines of a sadistic comic adventure laid down by Mack Sennett years ago. ... But slapstick implies a bright tradition. Let's not call it anything."

Critic Philip K. Scheuer of the Los Angeles Times compared Jack Carson's performance to that of Red Skelton in The Fuller Brush Man: "Skelton, it seems to me, has the edge on Carson when it comes to this kind of anything-goes comedy. While Red may be thick-skinned, he constantly demonstrates that he can take it and, with the unquenchable instinct of the do-gooder, bobs up smiling for more. Carson, on the other hand, is thick-skinned, period. ... In his ponderous, wise-cracking way, he gets around."
