= Laurie Hill (TV series) =

American sitcom

- Laurie Hill opening title
- Genre: Sitcom
- Created by: Neal Marlens; Carol Black
- Directed by: Linda Day
- Starring: DeLane Matthews; Robert Clohessy; Eric Lloyd; Ellen DeGeneres; Kurt Fuller; Joseph Maher; Doris Belack
- Composer: W.G. Snuffy Walden
- Country of origin: United States
- Original language: English
- No. of seasons: 1
- No. of episodes: 10 (5 unaired)

Production
- Production companies: The Black/Marlens Company; Touchstone Television

Original release
- Network: ABC
- Release: September 30 – October 28, 1992

Laurie Hill is an American sitcom that ran on ABC from September 30, 1992, until October 28, 1992. It starred DeLane Matthews as Dr. Laurie Hill, a pediatrician who tried balancing her roles as a doctor, wife and a mother to her young son. The series was created by Neal Marlens and Carol Black and produced by Touchstone Television.

== Synopsis ==
Laurie Hill (Matthews) was a pediatrician who partnered in a local neighborhood clinic known as Wiseman, Kramer & Hill. She was as fiercely loyal to her clinic and profession as she was compassionate in all aspects of her life. Constantly on call, Laurie was also on the emergency staff of the large St. John's Hospital, where cases often brought this otherwise low-key and gentle series into more adult territory. Balancing her personal and professional lives was another matter, as Laurie tried her best to make time for her husband Jeff (Robert Clohessy), a freelance writer who worked from home, and to be a pro-active mother to her rambunctious, adorable five-year-old son Leo (Eric Lloyd). Jeff, who was a kid at heart, took Laurie's schedule in stride as he reveled in the joys of being home for Leo. Father and son bonded over televised football games and other forms of manhood, which helped Leo cope with the longing he often felt for his busy mother. However, Jeff would sometimes wish for Laurie to slow down as well, expressing his desire for them to have more children. Laurie was not opposed to the idea, but wasn't sure how it would all work.

Laurie's colleagues at the clinic included doctors Spencer Kramer (Kurt Fuller), a practitioner who preferred not to treat children, and Walter Wiseman (Joseph Maher), the senior partner who was considering retirement. The office staff included receptionist Beverly Fielder (Doris Belack) and nurse Nancy MacIntyre (Ellen DeGeneres), both of whom were close with Laurie.

Stories alternated between Laurie's personal and professional fronts, and the variety of patients and cases assigned to her. Some of the latter were lighthearted and simplistic; to further add to the comedy/drama aspect of the series, some stories dealt with more serious issues, such as a patient's run-in with domestic violence, and Laurie and Nancy's suspicion that a young boy's low white blood cell count may be the sign of a more serious illness--AIDS—than what was first suspected. Laurie found herself getting emotionally involved with the case of the young boy, as she compared the parents' fears with the concern she would share for son Leo.

== Cast ==
=== Main ===
- DeLane Matthews as Dr. Laurie Hill
- Robert Clohessy as Jeff Hill
- Eric Lloyd as Leo Hill
- Ellen DeGeneres as Nancy MacIntyre
- Kurt Fuller as Dr. Spencer Kramer
- Joseph Maher as Dr. Walter Wiseman
- Doris Belack as Beverly Fielder

=== Guest stars ===
- Ty Burrell as Arthur
- Larry Miller as Jack

== Episodes ==
No.	Title	Directed by	Written by	Original release date
1	"Pilot"	Steve Miner	Neal Marlens & Carol Black	September 30, 1992
2	"Women on the Verge"	Linda Day	David Rosenthal	October 7, 1992
3	"Crush"	Unknown	Neal Marlens & Carol Black	October 14, 1992
4	"Grasshopper"	Unknown	Unknown	October 21, 1992
5	"Sick and Tired"	Unknown	Stephen Neigher	October 28, 1992
6	"The Birds, the Bees and the Elephants"	TBD	David Rosenthal	Unaired
7	"The Heart Thing"	Neal Marlens	Neal Marlens & Carol Black	Unaired
8	"Walter and Beverly"	TBD	Rita Hsiao	Unaired
9	"Much Ado About Nancy"	TBD	David Rosenthal	Unaired
10	"The Babysitter"	TBD	Kim Friese	Unaired

== Broadcast and reception ==
Laurie Hill aired Wednesdays at 9:30/8:30c, creating bookending of shows from creators Marlens and Black for that evening's comedy lineup. The Wonder Years, which Marlens and Black also created/produced, kicked off the Wednesday night schedule. Set to air in the coveted time slot after sophomore hit series Home Improvement (which had moved into the Wednesday 9/8c slot just prior to that season's start), and given its creative lineage, Laurie Hill was expected to be successful. However, when Marlens and Black appeared on a press tour for the series in the summer of 1992, the first questions asked by those who had screened the pilot concerned whether or not they were serious about airing the program. This reception eventually led to reviews that cited the series as being uninspired, sorely lacking and not living up to the innovative Wonder Years.

Originally slated to have a mid-September preview telecast in the Tuesday 9:30/8:30 slot (after Roseanne), Laurie Hill was denied a special preview in the eleventh hour, and had its proper debut moved up to September 30, in its regular time slot. It also became the last of ABC's new fall series to premiere. The pilot episode ranked a respectable 38th place in the Nielsens when it finally aired, but it lost a lot of the audience from Home Improvement, the #4 program that week and its lead-in. ABC canceled Laurie Hill after the fifth episode's airing on October 28, 1992, leaving five remaining episodes unaired.

== After cancellation ==
From the show's premiere, Ellen DeGeneres was critically praised for her performance as Nancy MacIntyre. In the September 30, 1992 edition of the South Florida Sun Sentinel, columnist Tom Jicha explained in his review of the series, "The only comic relief comes from Ellen DeGeneres as Laurie's assistant. It's a brief – almost cameo – appearance, but it's sufficient to raise speculation she would make a more enjoyable character in her own program."

Months after the cancellation of Laurie Hill, Marlens and Black, together with partner David Rosenthal, received a new development deal with ABC, which resulted in the sitcom pilot entitled These Friends of Mine. Marlens and Black had enjoyed working with DeGeneres on Laurie Hill, and cast her as one of the four leads in their new comedy project. These Friends of Mine aired as a midseason replacement series beginning in March 1994, with DeGeneres again being a breakout talent among the cast. The series would be subsequently revamped to emphasize DeGeneres as the principal lead, and continued more familiarly thereafter as Ellen, running until 1998.
