= A Cold Wind in August =

1961 film by Alexander Singer

- Directed by: Alexander Singer
- Written by: Burton Wohl; John Hayes
- Produced by: Phillip Hazleton
- Starring: Lola Albright; Scott Marlowe; Joe De Santis
- Cinematography: Floyd Crosby
- Edited by: Jerry Young
- Music by: Gerald Fried
- Production company: Troy Productions
- Distributed by: United Artists
- Release date: July 26, 1961
- Running time: 80 minutes
- Country: United States
- Language: English
- Budget: $163,000 USD

A Cold Wind in August is a 1961 low-budget drama exploitation film directed by Alexander Singer and adapted from the novel of the same name by Burton Wohl. The film stars Lola Albright as a mentally unbalanced burlesque-show stripper in her 30s who becomes involved in a torrid romance with a 17-year-old boy played by Scott Marlowe. In reality, Marlowe was actually 28, only eight years younger than Albright.

== Plot ==
Iris, a woman with a background as a burlesque-show stripper, is visited at her New York City apartment by her estranged husband. He requests that she star in an upcoming show in Newark, New Jersey for which he is obliged to supply performers. She resists the idea, as she maintains her privacy by not working in shows in the New York area. However, her husband is desperately in need of assistance. While she has no romantic feelings for him and wonders why she had married him, she is amicable and feels sorry for his predicament, so she agrees to consider it.

In the meantime, Iris meets Vito Perugino, the 17-year-old son of the superintendent of the apartment building, and experiences an instant and powerful physical attraction to him. In their first meeting, she is shamelessly flirtatious. In their second, she seduces Vito, starting a passionate affair. Iris unexpectedly experiences an emotional attraction, and a relationship that she had originally intended to be brief turns serious. Vito asks Iris "to go steady" with him, and although she laughs at the phrase, she happily accepts.

After Vito's jealousy causes trouble, Iris attempts to withdraw from him, but the attempt only makes her miserable. She becomes obsessed with him, wishing to resume a sexual and emotional satisfaction that she has never experienced with any other man. She returns to Vito and they begin to mend their relationship, declaring their love for one another, but Vito is still unaware of her occupation, believing her to be a model or actress.

When Iris performs in the Newark burlesque show, Vito's friend sees her and informs Vito. He initially refuses to believe it, but he attends the next night's show and confirms that Iris is indeed a burlesque performer. Vito lacks the ability to cope with the destruction of his idealistic view of Iris, and an explosive argument ensues.

After a week, Iris contacts Vito, hoping to reconcile by inviting him to her apartment for dinner. Upon his arrival, however, she quickly realizes that his interest in her has waned. Although he is no longer angry with Iris about her burlesque career, the discovery and argument has lessened his passion for the relationship. Vito acknowledges what Iris has sensed. He tries to console her, and Iris assures him that her love is genuine. Vito leaves, on his way to a date with the new object of his romantic attention, a girl his own age, and Iris is left alone sobbing.

== Cast ==
- Lola Albright as Iris Hartford
- Scott Marlowe as Vito Pellegrino
- Joe DeSantis as Papa Pellegrino
- Clark Gordon as Harry
- Janet Brandt as Shirley
- Skip Young as Al
- Ann Atmar as Carol
- Jana Taylor as Alice
- Dee Gee Green as Mary
- Herschel Bernardi as Juley Franz

== Reception ==
Frank for its time in its depiction of the sexual relationship between Vito and Iris, A Cold Wind in August was produced and marketed as a low-budget exploitation film. But unlike most entries in that genre, the film managed to find a somewhat positive critical following. It received positive reviews from the New York Herald Tribune, Variety and Saturday Review's Arthur Knight. Robert Osborne has called it one of the best of all films exploring the theme of a May–December romance, echoing Lloyd Shearer's contemporary opinion that it was "probably the best treatment of a youth's affair with an older woman Hollywood has ever produced." Pauline Kael called the film "shrewdly conceived and well-acted" and praised Albright's performance.

Critic A. H. Weiler of The New York Times wrote that the film "confused art for blatant sex" and Time called it a "nutty melodrama." In 1985, a different reviewer in The New York Times lauded Albright's acting in the film.

At the time of the film's production, Albright said that she believed it to have been her best role.

== Home video ==
A Cold Wind in August was released on DVD on March 29, 2011.

== See also ==
- List of American films of 1961
