= Lola Albright =

American actress and singer (1924–2017)

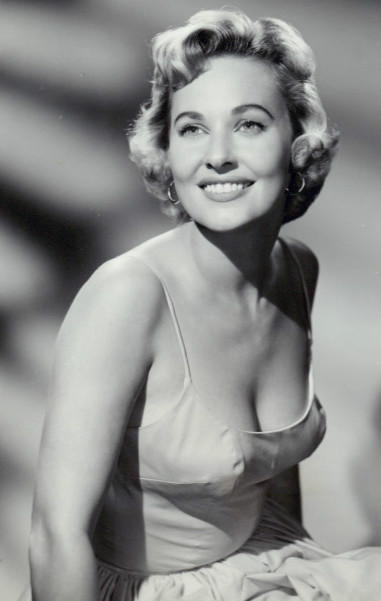
- Albright as Edie Hart in Peter Gunn, 1959
- Born: Lois Jean Albright; July 20, 1924; Akron, Ohio, U.S.
- Died: March 23, 2017 (aged 92); Los Angeles, California, U.S.
- Occupations: Actress, singer, model
- Years active: 1947–1984
- Spouses: Warren Dean (m. 1944; div. 1949); Jack Carson (m. 1952; div. 1958); Bill Chadney (m. 1961; div. 1975)

Lola Jean Albright (July 20, 1924 – March 23, 2017) was an American singer and actress, best known for playing the sultry singer Edie Hart, the girlfriend of private eye Peter Gunn, on all three seasons of the TV series Peter Gunn.

== Early years ==
Albright was born on July 20, 1924, in Akron, Ohio. Her mother was Marion A. (née Harvey) and her father was John Paul Albright, both of whom were gospel music singers. Lola's mother also was born in Ohio but her father was a native of North Dakota, who in 1930 supported the family by working as an inspector in a local insulating business.

Albright attended King Grammar School and was graduated from West High School in Akron in 1942. She sang in public at a young age and studied piano for 20 years. Beginning when she was 15 years old, she worked after school as a receptionist at radio station WAKR in Akron. She left WAKR at the age of 18 and moved to Cleveland, taking a job as a stenographer at WTAM radio. Her first radio performance came on WJW in Cleveland. Moving to Chicago, she worked as a photographer's model and was discovered by a talent scout, which led to her moving to Hollywood at the age of 23.

== Film ==
Albright made her motion-picture debut with a small singing role in the 1947 musical comedy The Unfinished Dance, and then appeared the following year in two Judy Garland movies: The Pirate and Easter Parade. She first gained studio and public notice in the 1949 film noir production Champion with her portrayal of the wife of a manipulative boxing manager; she falls for a prizefighter played by Kirk Douglas. For the next several years, she appeared in secondary roles in over 20 films, including several B Westerns. Among them was a co-starring role in the slapstick comedy The Good Humor Man in 1950 with future husband Jack Carson.

Some of the films in which Albright appeared were Tulsa (1949), starring Susan Hayward; The Silver Whip (1953), in which she played Dale Robertson's love interest; and The Tender Trap (1955), in which she was one of several women trying to trap a bachelor, played by Frank Sinatra, into marriage.

In the early 1950s, Albright was also a frequent model for pinup painter Gil Elvgren.

=== A Cold Wind in August ===
In 1961, she starred in Alexander Singer's A Cold Wind in August – a low-budget, black-and-white, independent film – as a divorced burlesque show stripper in her 30s who becomes involved in a torrid romance with a 17-year-old boy. Critic Pauline Kael offered high praise for Albright's performance. In 1985, The New York Times also lauded Albright's acting in the film. With respect to her personal assessment of her role in A Cold Wind in August, Albright said in 1961, "Some people come up to me and say, 'Lola, you shouldn't play that kind of part. It isn't you.' Well, I count to 10, bite my tongue, and then tell them that I'm an actress: I don't want to play myself."

=== Later films ===
Her performance in A Cold Wind in August gave fresh impetus to her film career, leading to roles in Elvis Presley's musical Kid Galahad in 1962, in which she played the hard-boiled, long-time girlfriend of a cynical boxing manager played by Gig Young, and in French director René Clément's Joy House as a wealthy widow with a passion for handing out meals to the poor (albeit with an ulterior motive). In Lord Love a Duck (1966) she portrayed a cocktail waitress who turns suicidal when she thinks she has ruined her daughter Tuesday Weld's life. The next year, she was in the Western epic The Way West.

She gave up her feature-film career in 1968 after completing her work in The Impossible Years, a generation-gap farce in which she performed as Alice Kingsley, the despairing wife of a professor of psychiatry played by David Niven and the mother of two teenaged daughters.

== Television ==
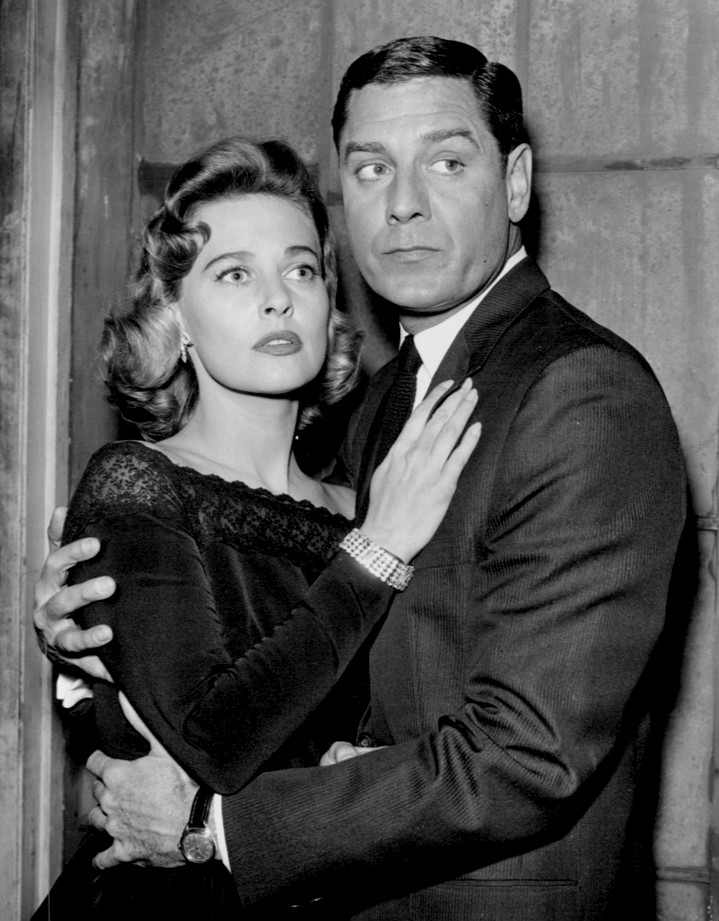
With Craig Stevens in Peter Gunn (1960)

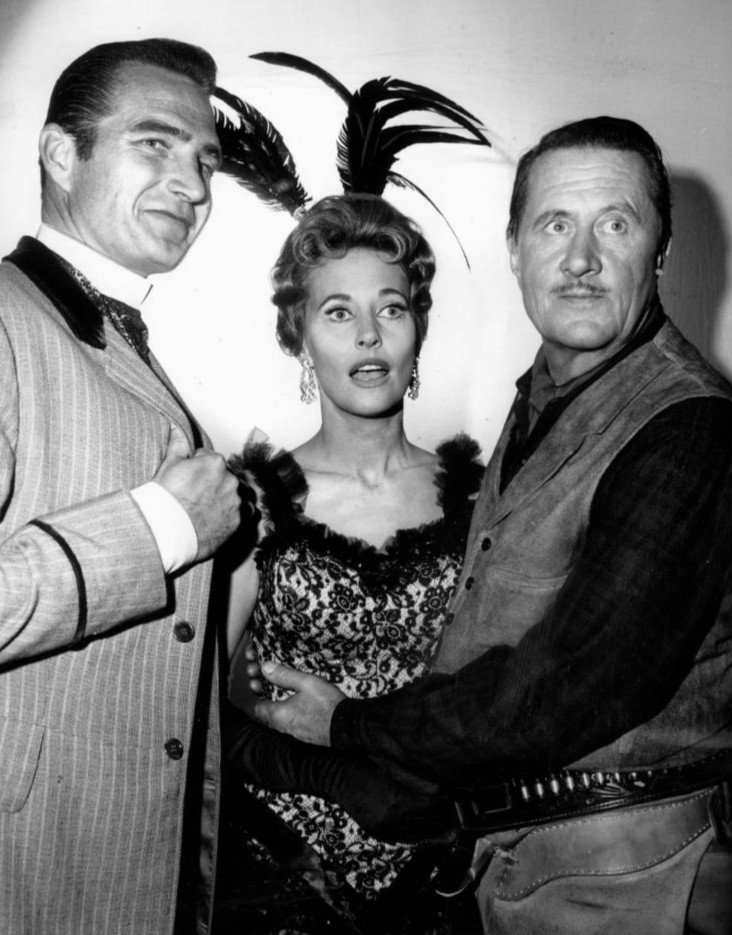
Eric Fleming and Allyn Joslyn in Rawhide (1964)

Unlike other film actors who were slow to begin acting in television, Albright was actively working in the medium from 1951. She appeared on the anthology series Lux Video Theatre in the episode "Inside Story". Later she had a recurring role on The Bob Cummings Show in the 1950s, and made guest appearances on television series such as Alfred Hitchcock Presents, Tales of Tomorrow (episode - All the Time in the World), The Thin Man, Gunsmoke, Rawhide, Laredo, Burke's Law, The Dick Van Dyke Show, My Three Sons, The Beverly Hillbillies, Bonanza (two episodes, including S6 E21 "The Search" 1965), The Man from U.N.C.L.E., Medical Center, Kojak, Columbo, McMillan & Wife, Quincy, M.E., Starsky & Hutch, The Incredible Hulk, and Branded.

In 1958, Albright was cast in Peter Gunn, the television detective series produced by Blake Edwards and scored by Henry Mancini. She played sultry Edie Hart, a nightclub singer and the romantic interest of Peter Gunn (Craig Stevens). "She was perfect casting for that role because she had an off-the-cuff kind of jazz delivery that was very hard to find," Mancini said in 1992. "Just enough to believe that she'd be singing in that club and that she shouldn't be on Broadway or doing movies." Over the course of 114 episodes produced for Peter Gunn, Albright sang in 38 of them, covering jazz classics such as "How High the Moon", "A Good Man Is Hard to Find", "Easy Street", and "Day In, Day Out".

When actress Dorothy Malone had to undergo emergency surgery, Albright filled in for her as the character Constance MacKenzie on the primetime soap opera Peyton Place. At the time, Albright called the role "one of the biggest challenges of my theatrical career." She continued to perform in films and to make guest appearances on television until her retirement in 1984.

== Music ==
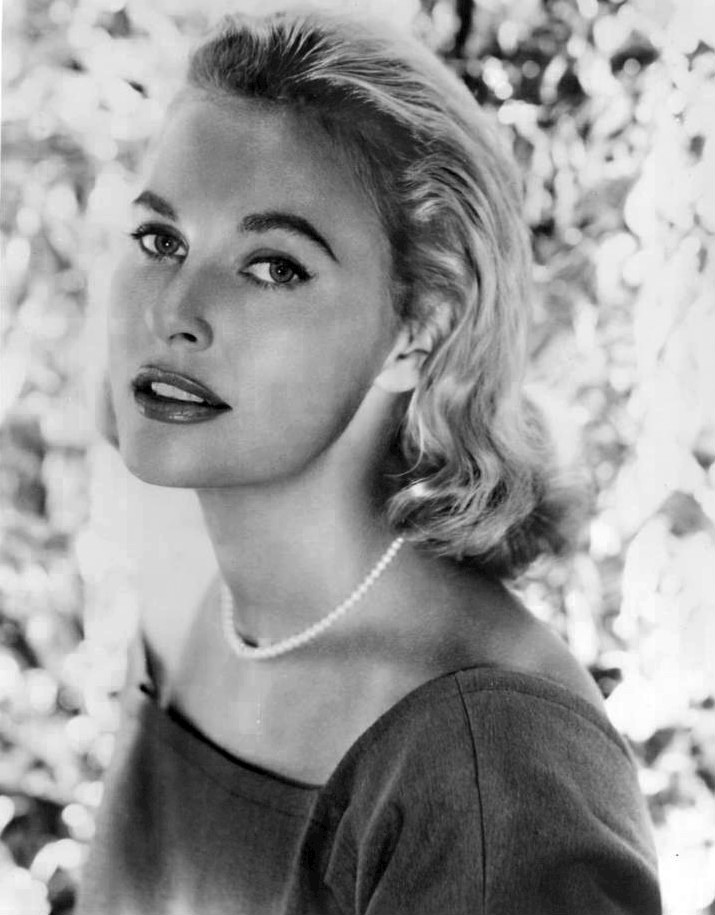
Albright singing on Kraft Music Hall (1962)

Columbia Records signed Albright as a vocalist, leading to the release of her album Lola Wants You in 1957. Albright's subsequent role on Peter Gunn and her performances singing on that series led directly to her second album, Dreamsville (1959), which was arranged by Henry Mancini and featured his orchestra. Albright is one of the few nonmovie-soundtrack singers for whom Mancini arranged.

== Recognition ==
In 1959, Albright was nominated for the Emmy Award for Best Supporting Actress (Continuing Character) in a Dramatic Series for her work on Peter Gunn. In 1966, she won the Silver Bear for Best Actress award at the 16th Berlin International Film Festival for her role in Lord Love a Duck.

== Personal life ==
Albright married and divorced three times. Her first marriage, to Cleveland radio announcer Warren K. Deem, occurred in 1944. They divorced in 1949. From 1951 to 1958, her second husband was actor Jack Carson, who had been her co-star in The Good Humor Man (1950). (Another source says that they married August 1, 1952, and divorced November 10, 1958.) Albright was married to musician Bill Chadney, who played her pianist at the bar called Mother's on Peter Gunn, from 1961 to 1971.

Following her retirement from acting in the early 1980s, Albright spent her remaining years living in Toluca Lake, Los Angeles. In 2014, she fell and fractured her spine, an injury that contributed to a general decline in her health over the next three years. On March 23, 2017, Albright died at her home at the age of 92.

== Filmography ==
Film
Year	Title	Role	Notes
1947	The Unfinished Dance	Associate	Uncredited
1948	The Pirate	Isabella	
1948	Easter Parade	Model	Uncredited
1948	Julia Misbehaves	Mannequin	Uncredited
1949	Champion	Palmer Harris	
1949	Tulsa	Candy Williams	
1949	The Girl from Jones Beach	Vickie	Uncredited
1949	Bodyhold	Mary Simmons	
1950	The Good Humor Man	Margie Bellew	
1950	Beauty on Parade	Kay Woodstock	
1950	When You're Smiling	Peggy Martin	
1950	He's a Cockeyed Wonder	Actress	Uncredited
1950	The Killer That Stalked New York	Francie Bennet	
1950	Sierra Passage	Ann Walker	
1952	Arctic Flight	Martha Raymond	
1953	The Silver Whip	Waco	
1955	Treasure of Ruby Hills	May	
1955	The Magnificent Matador	Mona Wilton	
1955	The Tender Trap	Poppy Masters	
1957	Pawnee	Meg Alden	
1957	The Monolith Monsters	Cathy Barrett	
1957	Oregon Passage	Sylvia Dane	
1958	Seven Guns to Mesa	Julie Westcott	
1961	A Cold Wind in August	Iris Hartford	
1962	Kid Galahad	Dolly Fletcher	
1964	Joy House	Barbara	
1966	Lord Love a Duck	Marie Greene	
1967	The Way West	Rebecca "Becky" Evans	
1967	The Money Jungle	Peggy Lido	
1968	Where Were You When the Lights Went Out?	Roberta Lane	
1968	The Impossible Years	Alice Kingsley	
1968	The Helicopter Spies	Azalea Kharmusi	

Short subjects:

- The Soundman (1950)
- Screen Snapshots: Hollywood Cowboy Stars (1955)
- Filmmaking on the Riviera (1964)

Television
Year	Title	Role	Notes
1951	Lux Video Theatre	Jennifer/Miriam	Episode 38: "Inside Story"
1951	Armstrong Circle Theatre		Episode: "Twenty-One Days"
1952	All Star Revue	Guest Vocalist	Episode: "2.24"
1952	Tales of Tomorrow	Carol Williams	Episode: "The Miraculous Serum"
1953	Racket Squad	Nancy Metcalfe	Episode: "The System"
1954	Fireside Theatre	Joyce	Episode: "Invitation to Marriage"
1954	The Pepsi-Cola Playhouse	Jane	Episode: "Borrow My Car"
1954	Duffy's Tavern	Sherry	Episode: "Archie Faces Marriage"
1954	Adventures of the Falcon		Episode: "The Golden Phony"
1955	Screen Directors Playhouse	Nancy Wheeler	Episode: "Arroyo"
1955	It's a Great Life	Marilyn	Episode: "Double Date"
1955	Gunsmoke	Lucy Hunt	Episode: "Reed Survives"
1955–1957	The Bob Cummings Show	Kay Michaels	7 episodes
1956	Four Star Playhouse	Beverly Hudson	Episode: "No Limit"
1956	The People's Choice	Dancer	Episode: "Sock, the Budget Balancer"
1956	Celebrity Playhouse		Episode: "Girl at Large"
1956–1957	The Red Skelton Hour	Herself/Priscilla/Spy	2 episodes
1957	Code 3	Carol	Episode: "Sunset Strip"
1958	The Thin Man	Katherine West	Episode: "The Tennis Champ"
1958	Panic!	Karen Adams	Episode: "Fingerprints"
1958	Target		Episode: "The Jewel Thief"
1958–1961	Peter Gunn	Edie Hart	Main role; 84 episodes
1960	Michael Shayne	Marie Leonard	Episode: "Framed in Blood"
1961	The United States Steel Hour		Episode: "Famous"
1961	King of Diamonds	Margie Howard	Episode: "The Wizard of Ice"
1961	The Detectives	Edna Craven	Episode: "The Queen of Craven Point"
1961	Adventures in Paradise	Nita Graham	Episode: "One Way Ticket"
1961	General Electric Theater	Cathy Armstrong	Episode: "Cat in the Cradle"
1962	Saints and Sinners	Emily Fielder	Episode: "Dear George, the Siamese Cat Is Missing"
1962	My Three Sons	Paulette Francis	Episode: "Going Steady"
1962–1964	The Alfred Hitchcock Hour	Lisa/Ruth Burke/Eva Martin	3 episodes
1963	The Beverly Hillbillies	Gloria Buckles	Episode: "Granny's Spring Tonic"
1963	The Third Man	Edie	Episode: "The Way of McEagle"
1963	The Eleventh Hour	Lillian Marnell	Episode: "Cold Hands, Warm Heart"
1963–1965	Burke's Law	Various	5 episodes
1964	The Dick Van Dyke Show	Paula Marshall	Episode: "How to Spank a Star"
1964	Dr. Kildare	Gertrude Carey	Episode: "A Nickel's Worth of Prayer"
1964	Mr. Broadway	Duff Daniels	Episode: "Sticks and Stones May Break My Bones"
1964	Wagon Train	Leonora Parkman	Episode: "Those Who Stay Behind"
1964–1965	Rawhide	Maribelle Ashton-Warner/Lottie Denton	Episode: "Incident of the Banker"
1965	Laredo	Lilah Evans	Episode: "Above the Law"
1965–1966	Peyton Place	Constance Mackenzie Carson	Main role; 8 episodes
1965–1966	Branded	Ann Williams	3 episodes
1965–1967	Bonanza	Ann/Dolly Bantree	2 episodes
1966–1967	Bob Hope Presents the Chrysler Theatre	Edith Woodland/Vickie Tate	2 episodes
1967	How I Spent My Summer Vacation	Mrs. Pine	TV movie
1967	The Man from U.N.C.L.E.	Azalea Kharmusi	2 episodes
1967	Ready and Willing	Wilma O'Brien	TV movie
1967	Cimarron Strip	Stacey Houston	Episode: "The Beast That Walks Like a Man"
1968	Off to See the Wizard	Sea Siren	Voice; 2 episodes
1972–1974	Medical Center	Madeline Barris/Grace	2 episodes
1973	The ABC Afternoon Playbreak	Mary Fiske	Episode: "My Secret Mother"
1973	Kojak	Celia Lamb	Episode: "The Corrupter"
1975	The Nurse Killer	Hannah	TV movie
1975	Police Story	Minnie	Episode: "The Cutting Edge"
1976	McMillan & Wife	Nurse Fisher	Episode: "The Deadly Cure"
1976	Starsky and Hutch	Lola Turkel	Episode: "Bounty Hunter"
1976	Columbo	Clare Daley	Episode: "Fade in to Murder"
1977	Delta County, U.S.A.	Dossie Wilson	TV movie
1977	Terraces	Dorothea Cabe	TV movie
1978	Switch	Millie Tate	Episode: "Who Killed Lila Craig?"
1978	The Eddie Capra Mysteries	Kathleen Vale	Episode: "Where There's Smoke"
1981	The Incredible Hulk	Elizabeth Collins	2 episodes
1983	Quincy M.E.	Liz McKenna	Episode: "Murder on Ice"
1984	Airwolf	Beatrice Moretti	Episode: "Sins of the Past"
