= Skip Young (actor) =

American film and television actor

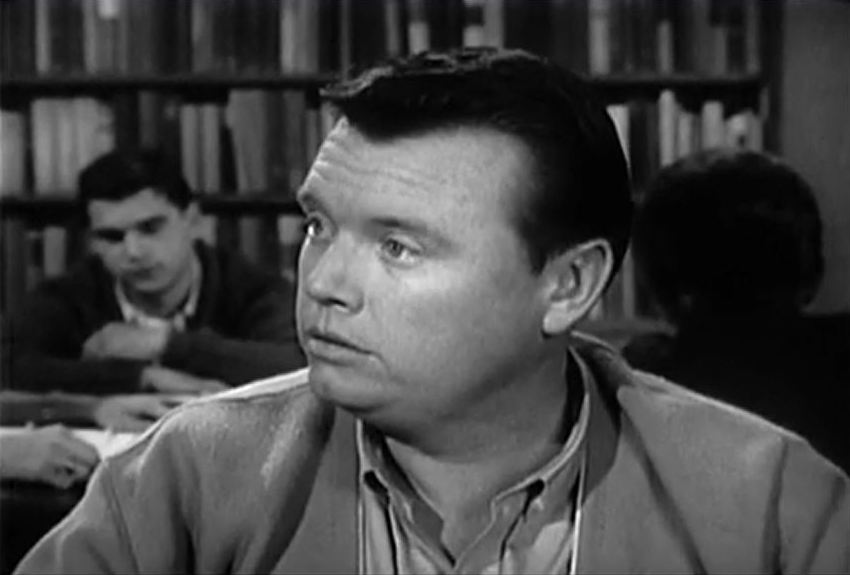
- Young in The Adventures of Ozzie and Harriet, 1962
- Born: Ronald Bix Plumstead; March 14, 1930; San Francisco, California, U.S.
- Died: March 17, 1993 (aged 63); Apple Valley, California, U.S.
- Occupations: Film and television actor
- Children: 1

Ronald Bix Plumstead (March 14, 1930 – March 17, 1993) was an American film and television actor. He was best known for playing Wally Plumstead in the American sitcom television series The Adventures of Ozzie and Harriet from 1957 to 1966.

== Life and career ==
Young was born in San Francisco, California. He began his career at the age of four, appearing in the 1934 short film produced by Manhattan-based Van Beuren Studios: No More West with Bert Lahr. He served in the United States Navy during the Korean War.

Later in his career, in 1957, Ozzie Nelson hired Young, and he was cast as Wally Plumstead, David's fraternity brother and best friend in the ABC sitcom television series The Adventures of Ozzie and Harriet, and remained on the television series through its final season in 1966. After the series ended in 1966, he guest-starred in television programs including My Three Sons, Green Acres, Custer, Adam-12, Starsky & Hutch, and Growing Pains. He also appeared in films such as A Cold Wind in August, WUSA, and Lobster Man from Mars. In 1973, he moved to Apple Valley, California, where he lived near his daughter. In his later life, he was a presenter on a local radio show participating in various community events.

== Death ==
Young, who suffered from heart disease and diabetes died on March 17, 1993 of natural causes, at his home in Apple Valley, California, at the age of 63. He was buried in Riverside National Cemetery.
