= Tom Gilson =

American actor (1934–1962)

- Born: January 6, 1934; New York City, U.S.
- Died: October 6, 1962 (aged 28); Van Nuys, California, U.S.
- Occupation: Actor
- Years active: 1952–1962

Tom Gilson (New York City; January 6, 1934 – Van Nuys, California; October 6, 1962) was an American actor in TV and occasional films from the 1950s.

== Biography ==
Born in New York City, the tall, powerfully built Gilson played roles in TV western series such as Maverick, Lawman, Tales of Wells Fargo, Bat Masterson and Cheyenne, but perhaps his best-remembered part was in an episode of the classic sitcom The Phil Silvers Show, in which he played a variation on Elvis Presley named "Elvin Pelvin." In 1960 Gilson appeared as Deputy Sheriff Babe Riker on Cheyenne in the episode titled "Alibi for the Scalped Man."

Gilson married Saundra Edwards (both appear in the film The Crowded Sky, he a passenger and she a flight attendant) in 1961 and they had a son, Tom Jr, but the marriage was stormy and ill-fated, and Edwards left Gilson and moved to her sister's house in Van Nuys, California. After apparent drunken behavior and death threats, Gilson broke into the house, and Edwards shot him dead, fearing for the safety of herself, her son from a previous marriage, and her baby son. Although a coroner's jury later judged the killing as justifiable homicide, Edwards' own career never recovered, and she never appeared in another film or TV program.

== Television ==
Year	Title	Role	Notes
1959	Wanted Dead or Alive	Tooney	season 2 episode 11 (desert seed)
1959	The Lawman	Hoak Barnes	Season 1 episode 28 (The Young Toughs)
1960	Wanted Dead or Alive	Frank	season 3 episode 4 (The looters)
