= Seasons of the Heart (1994 film) =

American 1994 movie

- Genre: Drama
- Written by: Robbyn Burger
- Directed by: Lee Grant
- Starring: Carol Burnett; George Segal; Eric Lloyd; Malcolm McDowell
- Music by: Marvin Hamlisch
- Country of origin: United States
- Original language: English

Production
- Executive producer: Robert Halmi Jr.
- Producer: Joseph Feury
- Cinematography: Douglas Milsome
- Editor: David Ray
- Running time: 92 minutes
- Production companies: RHI Entertainment; Joseph Feury Productions

Original release
- Network: NBC
- Release: May 24, 1994

Seasons of the Heart is a 1994 American made-for-television drama film directed by actress and filmmaker Lee Grant, starring Carol Burnett and George Segal, alongside Eric Lloyd and Malcolm McDowell in supporting roles. Marvin Hamlisch composed the film's score. It was first broadcast on NBC on May 24, 1994.

== Plot ==
Vivian, a newly married book publisher, has her life turned upside down when she and her husband Ezra are unexpectedly tasked with raising her young grandson.

== Cast ==
- Carol Burnett... Vivian Levinson
- George Segal... Ezra Goldstine
- Eric Lloyd... David
- Jill Teed... Ellen
- Malcolm McDowell... Alfred McGuinness
- Scott Marlowe... Mike Santucci

== Reception ==
Variety praised the film for its "stellar performances" and claimed that it was "better than most of the movies of its genre." Its initial broadcast received 17.2 million viewers and was the 21st highest viewed broadcast of its week in the Nielsen ratings. Eric Lloyd was nominated for a Young Artist Award for his performance.
