= BarBara Luna =

American actress (b. 1938)

Barbara Luna
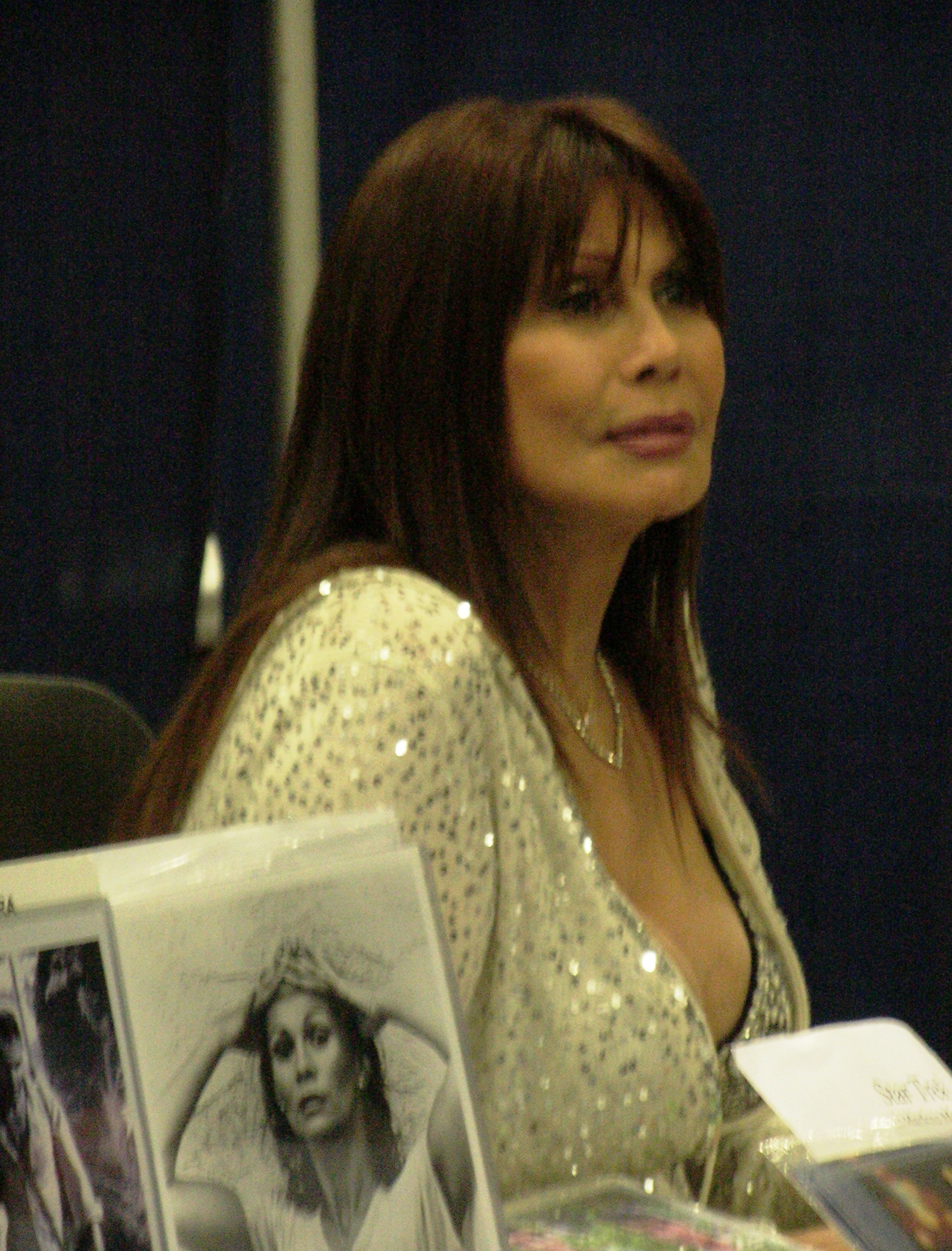
- Luna in New York 2009
- Born: Barbara Ann Luna; 2 March 1938 (age 88); New York City, U.S.
- Occupation: Actress
- Years active: 1949–present
- Known for: Five Weeks in a Balloon; Mirror, Mirror; South Pacific
- Spouses: Sander Mann Salkind (m. 1956; div. 1958); Doug McClure (m. 1961; div. 1964); Steven Hiram Gerber (m. 1993; div. 1998)
- Website: www.barbaraluna.com

Barbara Ann Luna (born 2 March 1938), also stylized as BarBara Luna, is an American actress from film, television and musicals. Notable roles include Makia in Five Weeks in a Balloon and Lt. Marlena Moreau in the classic Star Trek episode "Mirror, Mirror". In 2004 and 2010 she appeared in the first and sixth episodes of Star Trek: New Voyages, a fan-created show distributed over the Internet (retitled Star Trek: Phase II in 2008).

== Life and career ==
BarBara Luna (as spelled on her official site) was born in Manhattan, New York. Her mother was Jewish from Budapest, Hungary and her maternal grandfather was from Italy. Her father was born in Manila, Philippines. With this background, Luna was cast in a variety of ethnic roles.

Luna played Ngana, in the original Broadway production of South Pacific, in which she helped sing the show's opening song, Dites-Moi. She next appeared in The King and I as one of the Siamese children, advancing to the more important role of "Royal Dancer" by the time the show closed on Broadway. Not wishing to drop out of school to go on the road, she auditioned for and won the understudy role of Lotus Blossom in Teahouse of the August Moon. After graduating from high school a few months later, she was given the starring role of Lotus Blossom in Teahouse and toured with the show's company from its launch in December 1954 to its final performance in June 1956.

Director Mervyn LeRoy saw Luna's performance as Lotus Blossom in Los Angeles and cast her to play Camille, the blind girl who was Frank Sinatra's love interest in The Devil at 4 O'Clock three years after she made her film debut in Tank Battalion (1958). This led to roles in other films, including as Meli in Firecreek, as Amparo in Ship of Fools, as Cat in The Concrete Jungle and as Makia in Five Weeks in a Balloon.

Opportunities in television came as well. She appeared on Have Gun - Will Travel S2 E19 "The Monster" as Lupita (1960). One of Luna's better-known roles was as Lt. Marlena Moreau in the "Mirror, Mirror" episode of Star Trek: The Original Series (1967), a role she commemorates as a guest of Star Trek conventions worldwide. She has appeared in some 500 television series, including Walt Disney's Zorro, where she was a recurring character in the "Joaquin" arc as Theresa, the Tamale Peddler; the role of Rikki Stevens in the 1958 Perry Mason episode "The Case of the Sardonic Sergeant"; The Man from U.N.C.L.E. episode "The Man from THRUSH Affair" as Marnya; The Wild Wild West as Gatita; The Big Valley as Miranda (1968); Gunsmoke as Chavela (in "He Learned About Women" Episode 21 Season 7); Overland Trail as Estrelita (in episode "Mission to Mexico"); Bonanza as Cayetena Losaro; The Outer Limits as Gaby Christian; The Invaders as Lisa; Hawaiian Eye in three episodes: "The Koa Man" as Susan Chang, "Sword of the Samurai" as Michiko and "Payoff" as Tia Kuno; Hawaii Five-O in two episodes: "A Thousand Pardons, You're Dead" as Yoko Collins and "A Lion in the Streets" as Elena Kamoku; Buck Rogers in the 25th Century as Koori; Dallas as Carmen Esperanza; Charlie's Angels as Cynthia Weaver; two guest starring roles on the original Mission: Impossible and in the 1980s remake of that series; and roles in the television soap operas Search for Tomorrow and One Life to Live.

Between film commitments, Luna remained active in musicals. She appeared as Anita in five companies of West Side Story, including a revival at Lincoln Center in New York City. Her last Broadway show was A Chorus Line in the role of Diana Morales (in the "New" New York cast in 1976). This performance led to the preparation of a cabaret act for her. Its opening night at Freddie's in New York City drew rave reviews and led to engagements at the Concord Resort Hotel in the Catskills and at clubs in Atlantic City and Los Angeles. A review of her cabaret show in The New York Times found her singing flawed because "her small kittenish voice with its wobbly pitch and wide vibrato was simply not up to the task" of singing songs associated with well-known vocalists.

Actor Doug McClure was Luna's second husband.

== Awards ==
Barbara Luna was given a Lifetime Achievement Award on September 6, 2026 at the 3rd Annual Manila International Film Festival.

== Filmography ==
- Tank Battalion (1958)
- Cry Tough (1959)
- The Blue Angel (1959)
- Elmer Gantry (1960)
- The Devil at 4 O'Clock (1961)
- Five Weeks in a Balloon (1962)
- Dime with a Halo (1963)
- Mail Order Bride (1964)
- Synanon (1965)
- Ship of Fools (1965)
- Winchester '73 (1966, television movie)
- Firecreek (1968)
- Che! (1969)
- The Gatling Gun (originally titled as King Gun) (1971)
- Women in Chains (1972)
- Gentle Savage (1973)
- The Concrete Jungle (1982)
- Fool's Paradise (1997)
- Jay Sebring....Cutting to the Truth (2020)

== Television work ==
- Have Gun – Will Travel Season One Episode 37 "Silver Convoy" played Lupita
- Zorro 4 episodes: "The New Order" (11/13/1958); "An Eye for an Eye" (11/20/1958); "Zorro and the Flag of Truce" (11/27/1958); "Ambush" (12/04/1958);
- Perry Mason episode: "The Case of the Sardonic Sergeant" (1958)
- The Untouchables episode: "Mexican stake-out" (1959)
- Mickey Spillane's Mike Hammer episode: "So That's Who That Was" (1958)
- Bonanza episode: "El Toro Grande" (1960)
- Death Valley Days episode: "Pete Kitchen's Wedding"
- Tales of Wells Fargo episode: "Vasquez" played Rosita (26/5/1960)
- The Untouchables episode: The Death Tree (aired 2/12/1962)
- The Real McCoys "The Love Bug Bites Pepino" (Season 6 Episode 12, 1962)
- Gunsmoke episode: "He Learned About Women" (Season 7 Episode 21 aired 2/24/1962)
- GE True episode: "Five Tickets to Hell" (1963)
- The Outer Limits episode: "It Crawled Out of the Woodwork" (1963)
- Ripcord episode: "A Present for Felipe" (1963)
- Calhoun: County Agent (1964) (unsold pilot)
- The Wild Wild West episode: "The Night of the Deadly Bed" (1965)
- Burke's Law episode: "Nightmare in the Sun" (1965)
- The F.B.I. 4 episodes (1966–1969)
- Mission: Impossible episodes: "Elena" (12/10/1966) and "Time Bomb" (12/21/1969)
- Cimarron Strip episode: "The Legend of Jud Starr" (9/14/67)
- The Invaders episode: "Storm" (1967)
- The Man from U.N.C.L.E. episode: "The Man from THRUSH Affair" (1967)
- Winchester '73 (1967)
- Star Trek: The Original Series episode: "Mirror, Mirror" (1967)
- The High Chaparral episode: "The Firing Wall" (1967)
- Hawaiian Eye 3 episodes: "The Koa Man" (12/30/1959); "Sword of the Samurai" (2/3/1960); "Payoff" (3/28/1962)
- The Big Valley 1968 Episode: Miranda S03, E18. (First Aired: Jan. 15, 1968)
- Hawaii Five-O 2 episodes: "A Thousand Pardons -- You're Dead!" (1969); "A Lion in the Streets" (1979)
- Lancer episode: "Life Line" (1970)
- The Young Lawyers episode: "The Glass Prison" (1970)
- Two Boys (1970) (unsold pilot)
- Love, American Style segment: "Love and the Sweet Sixteen" (1971)
- Women in Chains (1972)
- Cannon episode: "Flight Plan" (1972) and "Lady on the Run" (1975)
- Mannix episode: "Silent Target" (1973)
- The Hanged Man (1974)
- Kung Fu episode: "A Lamb to the Slaughter" (1974)
- Police Story (1973 TV series) episode: "The Man in the Shadows" (2/25/1975)
- They Only Come Out at Night (1975)
- Brenda Starr (1976)
- The Six Million Dollar Man episode: "Vulture of the Andes" (1976)
- Project U.F.O. episode: "The Joshua Flats Incident" (1978)
- Pleasure Cove (1979)
- Buck Rogers in the 25th Century episodes: "Time of the Hawk" (1/15/1981) and "The Guardians" (1/29/81)
- Search for Tomorrow (cast member in 1985)
- T. J. Hooker episode: "Outcall" (1985)
- One Life to Live (cast member from 1986–1987)
- Mission: Impossible episode: "The Fortune" (2/18/1989)
- Lady Against the Odds (1992)
- Sunset Beach (cast member in 1998)
- Noriega: God's Favorite (2000)
- Star Trek: New Voyages episode: "In Harm's Way" (2004), episode: "Enemy: Starfleet" (2010)
