= List of awards and nominations received by James Burrows =

This is a list of awards and nominations received by American television director James Burrows. Burrows has received numerous accolades including 11 Primetime Emmy Awards and five Directors Guild of America Awards. He was honored with the Directors Guild of America Lifetime Achievement Award in 2015 and the NBC special Must See TV: An All-Star Tribute to James Burrows in 2016.

Burrows started his career with The Mary Tyler Moore Show. He since has directed over 50 television pilots and co-created the television series Cheers (1982–1993). He is also known for directing numerous episodes of comedy shows such as The Bob Newhart Show, Taxi, Frasier, Friends, Will & Grace, 3rd Rock from the Sun, and The Big Bang Theory. He executive produced the Emmy Award-winning ABC specials Live in Front of a Studio Audience including Norman Lear's "All in the Family" and "The Jeffersons" in 2019, "All in the Family" and "Good Times" in 2019, and "The Facts of Life" and "Diff'rent Strokes" in 2021. He directed episodes for the revivals of the NBC sitcom Will & Grace (2017–2020) and the Paramount+ Frasier.

== Major associations ==
=== Emmy Awards ===
Year	Category	Nominated work	Result	Ref.
Primetime Emmy Award
1980	Outstanding Directing for a Comedy Series	Taxi: "Louie and the Nice Girl"	Won	
1981	Outstanding Directing for a Comedy Series	Taxi: "Elaine's Strange Triangle"	Won	
1982	Outstanding Directing for a Comedy Series	Taxi: "Jim the Psychic"	Nominated	
1983	Outstanding Comedy Series	Cheers	Won	
1983	Outstanding Directing for a Comedy Series	Cheers: "Showdown, Part 2"	Won	
1984	Outstanding Comedy Series	Cheers	Won	
1984	Outstanding Directing for a Comedy Series	Cheers: "Old Flames"	Nominated	
1985	Outstanding Comedy Series	Cheers	Nominated	
1985	Outstanding Directing for a Comedy Series	Cheers: "Cheerio, Cheers"	Nominated	
1986	Outstanding Comedy Series	Cheers	Nominated	
1986	Outstanding Directing for a Comedy Series	Cheers: "The Triangle"	Nominated	
1987	Outstanding Comedy Series	Cheers	Nominated	
1987	Outstanding Directing for a Comedy Series	Cheers: "Chambers vs. Malone"	Nominated	
1988	Outstanding Comedy Series	Cheers	Nominated	
1988	Outstanding Directing for a Comedy Series	Cheers: "Backseat Becky, Up Front"	Nominated	
1989	Outstanding Comedy Series	Cheers	Won	
1989	Outstanding Directing for a Comedy Series	Cheers: "The Visiting Leecher"	Nominated	
1990	Outstanding Comedy Series	Cheers	Nominated	
1990	Outstanding Directing for a Comedy Series	Cheers: "The Improbable Dream, Part 1"	Nominated	
1991	Outstanding Comedy Series	Cheers	Won	
1991	Outstanding Directing for a Comedy Series	Cheers: "Woody Interruptus"	Won	
1991	Outstanding Informational Series	Cheers: The 200th Anniversary Special	Nominated	
1992	Outstanding Comedy Series	Cheers	Nominated	
1992	Outstanding Directing for a Comedy Series	Cheers: "An Old Fashioned Wedding"	Nominated	
1993	Outstanding Comedy Series	Cheers	Nominated	
1993	Outstanding Directing for a Comedy Series	Cheers: "One for the Road"	Nominated	
1994	Outstanding Directing for a Comedy Series	Frasier: "The Good Son"	Won	
1995	Outstanding Directing for a Comedy Series	Friends: "The One with the Blackout"	Nominated	
1996	Outstanding Directing for a Comedy Series	3rd Rock from the Sun: "Brains and Eggs"	Nominated	
1998	Outstanding Directing for a Comedy Series	Dharma & Greg: "Pilot"	Nominated	
1999	Outstanding Directing for a Comedy Series	Will & Grace: "Pilot"	Nominated	
2000	Outstanding Comedy Series	Will & Grace	Won	
2000	Outstanding Directing for a Comedy Series	Will & Grace: "Homo for the Holidays"	Nominated	
2001	Outstanding Comedy Series	Will & Grace	Nominated	
2001	Outstanding Directing for a Comedy Series	Will & Grace: "Lows in the Mid-Eighties"	Nominated	
2002	Outstanding Comedy Series	Will & Grace	Nominated	
2002	Outstanding Directing for a Comedy Series	Will & Grace: "A Chorus Lie"	Nominated	
2003	Outstanding Comedy Series	Will & Grace	Nominated	
2003	Outstanding Directing for a Comedy Series	Will & Grace: "24"	Nominated	
2004	Outstanding Comedy Series	Will & Grace	Nominated	
2005	Outstanding Comedy Series	Will & Grace	Nominated	
2005	Outstanding Directing for a Comedy Series	Will & Grace: "It's a Dad, Dad, Dad, Dad World"	Nominated	
2019	Outstanding Directing for a Variety Special	Live in Front of a Studio Audience: Norman Lear's "All in the Family" and "The Jeffersons"	Nominated	
2020	Outstanding Directing for a Comedy Series	Will & Grace: "We Love Lucy"	Nominated	
2020	Outstanding Variety Special (Live)	Live in Front of a Studio Audience: "All in the Family" and "Good Times"	Won	
2021	Outstanding Directing for a Comedy Series	B Positive: "Pilot"	Nominated	
2022	Outstanding Variety Special (Live)	Live in Front of a Studio Audience: "The Facts of Life" and "Diff'rent Strokes"	Nominated	
2025	Outstanding Directing for a Comedy Series	Mid-Century Modern: "Here's to You, Mrs. Schneiderman"	Nominated	

=== Directors Guild of America Awards ===
Year	Category	Nominated work	Result	Ref.
1981	Outstanding Directing - Comedy Series	Taxi: "Jim the Psychic"	Nominated	
1982	Outstanding Directing - Comedy Series	Cheers: "Sam at Eleven"	Nominated	
1983	Outstanding Directing - Comedy Series	Cheers: "Showdown, Part 2"	Won	
1984	Outstanding Directing - Comedy Series	Cheers: "I Call Your Name"	Nominated	
1985	Outstanding Directing - Comedy Series	Cheers: "Birth, Death, Love and Rice"	Nominated	
1986	Outstanding Directing - Comedy Series	Cheers: "Tan 'N' Wash"	Nominated	
1987	Outstanding Directing - Comedy Series	Cheers: "Home Is the Sailor"	Nominated	
1989	Outstanding Directing - Comedy Series	Cheers: "Sisterly Love"	Nominated	
1990	Outstanding Directing - Comedy Series	Cheers: "Woody Interruptus"	Won	
1991	Outstanding Directing - Comedy Series	Cheers: "Days of Wine & Neurosis"	Nominated	
1992	Outstanding Directing - Comedy Series	Cheers: "An Old-Fashioned Wedding"	Nominated	
1993	Outstanding Directing - Comedy Series	Frasier: "The Good Son"	Won	
1994	Outstanding Directing - Comedy Series	Frasier: "The Matchmaker"	Won	
1995	Outstanding Directing - Comedy Series	Friends: "The One with the Birth"	Nominated	
1997	Outstanding Directing - Comedy Series	Dharma & Greg: "Pilot"	Nominated	
1998	Outstanding Directing - Comedy Series	Will & Grace: "Pilot"	Nominated	
1999	Outstanding Directing - Comedy Series	Will & Grace: "Yours, Mine or Ours"	Nominated	
2000	Outstanding Directing - Comedy Series	Will & Grace: "Lows in the Mid-Eighties"	Won	
2001	Outstanding Directing - Comedy Series	Will & Grace: "Bed, Bath, and Beyond"	Nominated	
2002	Outstanding Directing - Comedy Series	Will & Grace: "Marry Me a Little"	Nominated	
2003	Outstanding Directing - Comedy Series	Will & Grace: "Last Ex to Brooklyn"	Nominated	
2005	Outstanding Directing - Comedy Series	Will & Grace: "Alive and Schticking"	Nominated	
2014	Directors Guild of America Lifetime Achievement Award – Television		Received	
2020	Outstanding Directing - Variety Specials	Live in Front of a Studio Audience	Won	

=== Producers Guild of America Awards ===
Year	Category	Nominated work	Result	Ref.
2003	Outstanding Producer of Episodic Comedy	Will & Grace	Nominated	
2004	Outstanding Producer of Episodic Comedy	Will & Grace	Nominated	
2005	Outstanding Producer of Episodic Comedy	Will & Grace	Nominated	

== Miscellaneous accolades ==
=== American Comedy Awards ===
- 1996 - Creative Achievement Award - Winner

=== Costume Designers Guild Awards ===
- 2009 - Distinguished Collaborator Award - Winner

=== Television Critics Association ===
- 2014 - Career Achievement Award - Winner

=== Online Film & Television Awards ===
- 2000 - OFTA Hall of Fame - Winner
