= Directors Guild of America Lifetime Achievement Award – Feature Film =

Special award given to film directors

The DGA Lifetime Achievement Award for Distinguished Achievement in Motion Picture Direction is an American film award presented by the Directors Guild of America (DGA) honoring career achievement in feature film direction. Formerly called D.W. Griffith Award, it was first awarded at the 5th Directors Guild of America Awards in 1953. The award is considered the Directors Guild's highest honor and its recipients are selected by the present and past presidents of the DGA.

== History ==
Originally established in honor of D. W. Griffith, the award was called D.W. Griffith Award between 1953 and 1999. In 1999, the DGA national board voted unanimously to remove Griffith's name from the DGA's lifetime achievement award and replace the award. DGA president Jack Shea stated that, although Griffith was an influential and innovative filmmaker, he also "helped foster intolerable racial stereotypes." Particularly Griffith's film The Birth of a Nation is criticized for its heroic portrayal of the Ku Klux Klan and its negative depiction of black people. The guild's decision to change the name of its highest honor caused controversy. While NAACP president Kweisi Mfume called it "the right thing to do" and stated that the award "should have never been given under the name of D. W. Griffith," the National Society of Film Critics criticized the name change in a statement, calling it "a depressing example of political correctness."

== Recipients ==
D.W. Griffith Award (1952–1998)

Year	Recipient(s)	Ref.
1952	Cecil B. DeMille	
1953	John Ford	
1954	No award	
1955	Henry King	
1956	King Vidor	
1957	No award	
1958	Frank Capra	
1959	George Stevens	
1960	Frank Borzage	
1961	No award	
1962	No award	
1963	No award	
1964	No award	
1965	William Wyler	
1966	No award	
1967	Alfred Hitchcock	
1968	No award	
1969	Fred Zinnemann	
1970	No award	
1971	No award	
1972	David Lean and William A. Wellman	
1973	No award	
1974	No award	
1975	No award	
1976	No award	
1977	No award	
1978	No award	
1979	No award	
1980	George Cukor	
1981	Rouben Mamoulian	
1982	John Huston	
1983	Orson Welles	
1984	Billy Wilder	
1985	Joseph L. Mankiewicz	
1986	Elia Kazan	
1987	Robert Wise	
1988	No award	
1989	Ingmar Bergman	
1990	No award	
1991	Akira Kurosawa	
1992	Sidney Lumet	
1993	Robert Altman	
1994	James Ivory	
1995	Woody Allen	
1996	Stanley Kubrick	
1997	Francis Ford Coppola	
1998	No award	

DGA Lifetime Achievement Award for Distinguished Achievement in Motion Picture Direction (1999–present)

Year	Recipient(s)	Ref.
1999	Steven Spielberg	
2000	No award	
2001	No award	
2002	Martin Scorsese	
2003	Mike Nichols	
2004	No award	
2005	Clint Eastwood	
2006	No award	
2007	No award	
2008	No award	
2009	Norman Jewison	
2010	No award	
2011	No award	
2012	Miloš Forman	
2013	No award	
2014	No award	
2015	No award	
2016	Ridley Scott	
2017	No award	
2018	No award	
2019	No award	
2020	No award	
2021	Spike Lee	
2022	No award	
2023	No award	
2024	Ang Lee	
2025	No award	

== See also ==
- Directors Guild of America Lifetime Achievement Award – Television
