= Directors Guild of America Award for Outstanding Directorial Achievement in Musical Variety =

Award for television directing (1971–2012)

- Awarded for: Outstanding Directorial Achievement in Musical Variety
- Country: United States
- Presented by: Directors Guild of America
- First award: 1971
- Final award: 2012
- Website: https://www.dga.org

The Directors Guild of America Award for Outstanding Directorial Achievement in Musical Variety was an annual award given by the Directors Guild of America between 1971 and 2012. In 2013, the guild announced the creation of two new accolades to replace the award: the Award for Outstanding Directorial Achievement in Variety/Talk/News/Sports – Regularly Scheduled Programming and the Award for Outstanding Directorial Achievement in Variety/Talk/News/Sports – Specials.

== Winners and nominees ==
=== 1970s ===
Year	Program	Episode	Winners and nominees	Network	Ref.
1971 (24th)	The Flip Wilson Show	–	Timothy Kiley	NBC	
1971 (24th)	The Dean Martin Show	–	Greg Garrison	NBC	
1971 (24th)	The Sonny & Cher Comedy Hour	–	Arthur Fisher	CBS	
1972 (25th)	Liza with a Z	–	Bob Fosse	NBC	
1972 (25th)	The Julie Andrews Hour	–	Bill Davis	ABC	
1972 (25th)	The Sonny & Cher Comedy Hour	–	Arthur Fisher	CBS	
1973 (26th)	Barbra Streisand and Other Musical Instruments	–	Dwight Hemion	NBC	
1973 (26th)	The Carol Burnett Show	–	Dave Powers	CBS	
1973 (26th)	The Sonny & Cher Comedy Hour	–	Arthur Fisher	CBS	
1974 (27th)	New York Philharmonic Young People's Concerts	"What Makes a Gershwin Tune a Gershwin Tune?"	Roger Englander	CBS	
1974 (27th)	The Perry Como Christmas Show	–	Nick Vanoff	CBS	
1974 (27th)	The Sonny & Cher Comedy Hour	–	Arthur Fisher	CBS	
1975 (28th)	The Lily Tomlin Special	–	Jay Sandrich	ABC	
1975 (28th)	John Denver: Rocky Mountain Christmas	–	Bill Davis	ABC	
1975 (28th)	Steve and Eydie: Our Love Is Here to Stay	–	Dwight Hemion	CBS	
1976 (29th)	Shirley Maclaine: Gypsy in My Soul	–	Tony Charmoli	CBS	
1976 (29th)	The Dorothy Hamill Special	–	Dwight Hemion	ABC	
1976 (29th)	Sills and Burnett at the Met	–	Dave Powers	CBS	
1977 (30th)	Neil Diamond: I'm Glad You're Here with Me Tonight	–	Arthur Fisher	NBC	
1977 (30th)	Mitzi...Zings Into Spring	–	Tony Charmoli	CBS	
1977 (30th)	Sinatra and Friends	–	Bill Davis	ABC	
1978 (31st)	Great Performances: Dance in America	"Choreography by Balanchine: Part 3"	Merrill Brockway	PBS	
1978 (31st)	The Second Barry Manilow Special	–	George Schaefer	ABC	
1978 (31st)	Steve Martin: A Wild and Crazy Guy	–	Gary Weis	NBC	
1979 (32nd)	John Denver and the Muppets: A Christmas Together	–	Tony Charmoli	ABC	
1979 (32nd)	The 3rd Barry Manilow Special	–	Don Mischer	ABC	
1979 (32nd)	In Performance at the White House	"Segovia at the White House"	David Deutsch	PBS	

=== 1980s ===
Year	Program	Episode	Winners and nominees	Network	Ref.
1980 (33rd)	IBM Presents Baryshnikov on Broadway	–	Dwight Hemion	ABC	
1980 (33rd)	Barry Manilow: One Voice	–	George Schaefer	ABC	
1980 (33rd)	Goldie and Liza Together	–	Don Mischer	CBS	
1981 (34th)	Great Performances: Dance in America	"The Spellbound Child"	Emile Ardolino	PBS	
1981 (34th)	Lily: Sold Out	–	Bill Davis and Tony Charmoli	CBS	
1981 (34th)	Sinatra: The Man and His Music	–	Clark Jones	NBC	
1982 (35th)	Shirley MacLaine: Illusions	–	Don Mischer	CBS	
1982 (35th)	Night of 100 Stars	–	Clark Jones	ABC	
1982 (35th)	Second City Television	"The Days Of The Week/Street Beef"	Jim Drake	NBC	
1983 (36th)	Motown 25: Yesterday, Today, Forever	–	Don Mischer	NBC	
1983 (36th)	Eubie Blake: A Century of Music	–	Daniel Feldman	PBS	
1983 (36th)	Live from Lincoln Center	"NYC Ballet Salute to George Balanchine"	Emile Ardolino	PBS	
1984 (37th)	Great Performances: Dance in America	"Baryshnikov By Tharp"	Don Mischer and Twyla Tharp	PBS	
1984 (37th)	Opening Ceremonies: The Olympics	–	Terry Jastrow	ABC	
1984 (37th)	Olympic Gala	–	Tony Charmoli	ABC	
1985 (38th)	Motown Returns to the Apollo	–	Don Mischer	NBC	
1985 (38th)	The 57th Annual Academy Awards	–	Marty Pasetta	ABC	
1985 (38th)	Live Aid	–	Tony Verna, Sandi Fullerton, Louis J. Horvitz, and Wendy Acey	MTV	
1986 (39th)	Liberty Weekend	–	Walter C. Miller	ABC	
1986 (39th)	Great Performances: Dance in America	"Choreography by Jerome Robbins with the New York City Ballet"	Emile Ardolino	PBS	
1986 (39th)	Neil Diamond...Hello Again	–	Dwight Hemion	CBS	
1987 (40th)	Julie Andrews... The Sound Of Christmas	–	Dwight Hemion	ABC	
1987 (40th)	Great Performances: Dance in America	"Made in USA with Mikhail Baryshnikov"	Don Mischer	PBS	
1987 (40th)	Late Night with David Letterman	"5th Anniversary Special"	Hal Gurnee	NBC	
1988 (41st)	Irving Berlin's 100th Birthday Celebration	–	Walter C. Miller	CBS	
1988 (41st)	Late Night with David Letterman	"6th Anniversary Special"	Hal Gurnee	NBC	
1988 (41st)	The Smothers Brothers Comedy Hour: The 20th Reunion	–	David Grossman	CBS	
1989 (42nd)	Great Performances: Dance in America	"Gregory Hines: Tap Dance in America"	Don Mischer	PBS	
1989 (42nd)	Billy Crystal: Midnight Train to Moscow	–	Paul Flaherty	HBO	
1989 (42nd)	Late Night with David Letterman in Chicago	–	Hal Gurnee	NBC	

=== 1990s ===
Year	Program	Episode	Winners and nominees	Network	Ref.
1990 (43rd)	The 62nd Annual Academy Awards	–	Jeff Margolis	ABC	
1990 (43rd)	In Living Color	"Pilot"	Paul Miller	Fox	
1990 (43rd)	Late Night with David Letterman	"8th Anniversary Special"	Hal Gurnee	NBC	
1991 (44th)	The 45th Annual Tony Awards	–	Walter C. Miller	CBS	
1991 (44th)	The 63rd Annual Academy Awards	–	Jeff Margolis	ABC	
1991 (44th)	Late Night with David Letterman	–	Hal Gurnee	NBC	
1992 (45th)	The Tonight Show Starring Johnny Carson	"Robin Williams/Bette Midler"	Bobby Quinn	NBC	
1992 (45th)	The 64th Annual Academy Awards	–	Jeff Margolis	ABC	
1992 (45th)	Late Night with David Letterman	"10th Anniversary Special"	Hal Gurnee	NBC	
1993 (46th)	The 65th Annual Academy Awards	–	Jeff Margolis	ABC	
1993 (46th)	1993 Kennedy Center Honors	–	Louis J. Horvitz	CBS	
1993 (46th)	Late Show with David Letterman	–	Hal Gurnee	CBS	
1993 (46th)	Leonard Bernstein Place	–	Humphrey Burton	A&E	
1993 (46th)	Tracey Ullman Takes on New York	–	Don Scardino	HBO	
1994 (47th)	Barbra Streisand: The Concert	–	Dwight Hemion and Barbra Streisand	HBO	
1994 (47th)	The 66th Annual Academy Awards	–	Jeff Margolis	ABC	
1994 (47th)	Great Performances	"Natalie Cole's Untraditional Traditional Christmas"	Patricia Birch	PBS	
1994 (47th)	Late Show with David Letterman	"#160"	Hal Gurnee	CBS	
1994 (47th)	The Three Tenors in Concert	–	William Cosel	PBS	
1995 (48th)	Great Performances	"Some Enchanted Evening: Celebrating Oscar Hammerstein"	Matthew Diamond	PBS	
1995 (48th)	The 67th Annual Academy Awards	–	Jeff Margolis	ABC	
1995 (48th)	Late Show with David Letterman from London	–	Hal Gurnee	CBS	
1995 (48th)	Sinatra: 80 Years My Way	–	Louis J. Horvitz	ABC	
1995 (48th)	The Tonight Show With Jay Leno from Las Vegas	–	Ellen Brown	NBC	
1996 (49th)	Opening Ceremonies: Atlanta Olympic Games	–	Don Mischer	NBC	
1996 (49th)	The 68th Annual Academy Awards	–	Jeff Margolis	ABC	
1996 (49th)	Sergei Grinkov: Celebration of a Life	–	Robert Fishman	CBS	
1996 (49th)	The Tonight Show With Jay Leno from Chicago	–	Ellen Brown	NBC	
1996 (49th)	Tracey Takes On...	"Romance"	Thomas Schlamme	HBO	
1997 (50th)	1997 Kennedy Center Honors	–	Louis J. Horvitz	CBS	
1997 (50th)	Fleetwood Mac Reunion Special	–	Bruce Gowers	MTV	
1997 (50th)	The Rosie O'Donnell Show	–	Arthur Forrest	Syndicated	
1997 (50th)	Tracey Takes On...	"Vegas"	Don Scardino	HBO	
1997 (50th)	Tracey Takes On...	"1976"	Thomas Schlamme	HBO	
1998 (51st)	The 52nd Annual Tony Awards	–	Paul Miller	CBS	
1998 (51st)	The 70th Annual Academy Awards	–	Louis J. Horvitz	ABC	
1998 (51st)	I'm Telling You for the Last Time	–	Marty Callner	HBO	
1998 (51st)	In Performance at the White House	"Savion Glover – Stomp, Slide & Swing"	Matthew Diamond	PBS	
1998 (51st)	Late Show with David Letterman	"Episode #958"	Jerry Foley	CBS	
1999 (52nd)	Tracey Takes On...	"The End of the World"	Dennie Gordon	HBO	
1999 (52nd)	The 71st Annual Academy Awards	–	Louis J. Horvitz	ABC	
1999 (52nd)	Annie	–	Rob Marshall	ABC	
1999 (52nd)	Late Show with David Letterman	"Episode #1294"	Jerry Foley	CBS	
1999 (52nd)	Saturday Night Live: 25th Anniversary	–	Beth McCarthy-Miller	NBC	

=== 2000s ===
Year	Program	Episode	Winners and nominees	Network	Ref.
2000 (53rd)	Saturday Night Live	"Val Kilmer/U2"	Beth McCarthy-Miller	NBC	
2000 (53rd)	The 72nd Annual Academy Awards	–	Louis J. Horvitz	ABC	
2000 (53rd)	ABC 2000 Today	–	Roger Goodman	ABC	
2000 (53rd)	Late Show with David Letterman	"Episode #1527"	Jerry Foley	CBS	
2000 (53rd)	The Tonight Show with Jay Leno	"Episode #1938"	Ellen Brown	NBC	
2001 (54th)	America: A Tribute to Heroes	–	Joel Gallen and Beth McCarthy-Miller		
2001 (54th)	The 55th Annual Tony Awards	–	Glenn Weiss	CBS	
2001 (54th)	2001 Kennedy Center Honors	–	Louis J. Horvitz	CBS	
2001 (54th)	Barbra Streisand: Timeless	–	Barbra Streisand and Don Mischer	Fox	
2001 (54th)	Late Show with David Letterman	"Episode #1634"	Jerry Foley	CBS	
2002 (55th)	From Broadway: Fosse	–	Matthew Diamond	PBS	
2002 (55th)	The 56th Annual Tony Awards	–	Glenn Weiss	CBS	
2002 (55th)	The 74th Annual Academy Awards	–	Louis J. Horvitz	ABC	
2002 (55th)	Late Show with David Letterman	"Episode #1876"	Jerry Foley	CBS	
2002 (55th)	Robin Williams: Live On Broadway	–	Marty Callner	HBO	
2003 (56th)	Cher: The Farewell Tour	–	David Mallet	NBC	
2003 (56th)	The 75th Annual Academy Awards	–	Louis J. Horvitz	ABC	
2003 (56th)	The Daily Show with Jon Stewart	–	Chuck O'Neil	Comedy Central	
2003 (56th)	Rolling Stones: Licks World Tour Live at Madison Square Garden	–	Marty Callner	HBO	
2003 (56th)	Saturday Night Live	"Christopher Walken/The Foo Fighters"	Beth McCarthy-Miller	NBC	
2004 (57th)	Genius: A Night for Ray Charles	–	Bruce Gowers	CBS	
2004 (57th)	The 76th Annual Academy Awards	–	Louis J. Horvitz	ABC	
2004 (57th)	The Daily Show with Jon Stewart	–	Chuck O'Neil	Comedy Central	
2004 (57th)	Great Performances	"Eric Clapton: Crossroads Guitar Festival"	Ron de Moraes	PBS	
2004 (57th)	Late Show with David Letterman	"Episode #2187"	Jerry Foley	CBS	
2005 (58th)	Great Performances: Dance in America	"Swan Lake with American Ballet Theater"	Matthew Diamond	PBS	
2005 (58th)	The 59th Annual Tony Awards	–	Glenn Weiss	CBS	
2005 (58th)	The 77th Annual Academy Awards	–	Louis J. Horvitz	ABC	
2005 (58th)	The Daily Show with Jon Stewart	–	Chuck O'Neil	Comedy Central	
2005 (58th)	Late Show with David Letterman	"Episode #2452"	Jerry Foley	CBS	
2005 (58th)	Live from Lincoln Center	"Higher Ground Hurricane Relief Benefit"	Alan Skog	PBS	
2006 (59th)	Tony Bennett: An American Classic	–	Rob Marshall	NBC	
2006 (59th)	The 60th Annual Tony Awards	–	Glenn Weiss	CBS	
2006 (59th)	American Idol	"Season 5 Finale: Episode #534/535"	Bruce Gowers	Fox	
2006 (59th)	The Daily Show with Jon Stewart	–	Chuck O'Neil	Comedy Central	
2006 (59th)	Saturday Night Live	"Alec Baldwin/Christina Aguilera"	Don Roy King	NBC	
2007 (60th)	The 61st Annual Tony Awards	–	Glenn Weiss	CBS	
2007 (60th)	The 79th Annual Academy Awards	–	Louis J. Horvitz	ABC	
2007 (60th)	The Colbert Report	"Episode #3052"	Jim Hoskinson	Comedy Central	
2007 (60th)	The Daily Show with Jon Stewart	–	Chuck O'Neil	Comedy Central	
2007 (60th)	Late Show with David Letterman	"Episode #2773"	Jerry Foley	CBS	
2008 (61st)	Opening Ceremony Beijing 2008 Olympic Summer Games	–	Bucky Gunts	NBC	
2008 (61st)	The 62nd Annual Tony Awards	–	Glenn Weiss	CBS	
2008 (61st)	The 80th Annual Academy Awards	–	Louis J. Horvitz	ABC	
2008 (61st)	The Daily Show with Jon Stewart	"Episode #13107"	Chuck O'Neil	Comedy Central	
2008 (61st)	Saturday Night Live	–	Don Roy King	NBC	
2009 (62nd)	We Are One: The Obama Inaugural Celebration at the Lincoln Memorial	–	Don Mischer	HBO	
2009 (62nd)	2009 Kennedy Center Honors	–	Louis J. Horvitz	CBS	
2009 (62nd)	The 25th Anniversary Rock and Roll Hall of Fame Concert	–	Joel Gallen	HBO	
2009 (62nd)	The 81st Annual Academy Awards	–	Roger Goodman	ABC	
2009 (62nd)	Saturday Night Live	"Justin Timberlake/Ciara"	Don Roy King	NBC	

=== 2010s ===
Year	Program	Episode	Winners and nominees	Network	Ref.
2010 (63rd)	The 64th Annual Tony Awards	–	Glenn Weiss	CBS	
2010 (63rd)	Bill Maher ...But I'm Not Wrong	–	John C. Moffit	HBO	
2010 (63rd)	In Performance at The White House	"Paul McCartney: The Library of Congress Gershwin Prize for Popular Song"	Linda Mendoza	PBS	
2010 (63rd)	Rally to Restore Sanity and/or Fear	–	Chuck O'Neil	Comedy Central	
2010 (63rd)	Saturday Night Live	"Betty White/Jay-Z"	Don Roy King	NBC	
2011 (64th)	The 65th Annual Tony Awards	–	Glenn Weiss	CBS	
2011 (64th)	2011 Kennedy Center Honors	–	Louis J. Horvitz	CBS	
2011 (64th)	The 83rd Annual Academy Awards	–	Don Mischer	ABC	
2011 (64th)	The Daily Show with Jon Stewart	"Episode #16070"	Chuck O'Neil	Comedy Central	
2011 (64th)	Saturday Night Live	"Justin Timberlake/Lady Gaga"	Don Roy King	NBC	
2012 (65th)	The 66th Annual Tony Awards	–	Glenn Weiss	CBS	
2012 (65th)	12-12-12: The Concert for Sandy Relief	–	Michael Dempsey		
2012 (65th)	The 84th Annual Academy Awards	–	Don Mischer	ABC	
2012 (65th)	The Daily Show with Jon Stewart	"Episode #17153"	Chuck O'Neil	Comedy Central	
2012 (65th)	Saturday Night Live	"Mick Jagger"	Don Roy King	NBC	

== Individuals with multiple awards ==
7 awards

- Don Mischer

4 awards

- Dwight Hemion
- Glenn Weiss

3 awards

- Walter C. Miller
- Matthew Diamond

2 awards

- Jeff Margolis
- Beth McCarthy-Miller

== Individuals with multiple nominations ==
16 nominations

- Louis J. Horvitz

13 nominations

- Don Mischer

9 nominations

- Hal Gurnee
- Chuck O'Neil
- Glenn Weiss

8 nominations

- Jerry Foley

7 nominations

- Dwight Hemion
- Jeff Margolis

6 nominations

- Don Roy King

5 nominations

- Tony Charmoli
- Arthur Fisher

4 nominations

- Bill Davis
- Matthew Diamond
- Beth McCarthy-Miller

3 nominations

- Emile Ardolino
- Ellen Brown
- Marty Callner
- Bruce Gowers
- Walter C. Miller

2 nominations

- Joel Gallen
- Roger Goodman
- Clark Jones
- Rob Marshall
- Paul Miller
- Dave Powers
- Don Scardino
- George Schaefer
- Thomas Schlamme
- Barbra Streisand

== Total awards by network ==
- CBS – 12
- NBC – 12
- ABC – 7
- PBS – 7
- HBO – 3
