= Frank Capra Achievement Award =

The Frank Capra Achievement Award is an American film award established by the Directors Guild of America (DGA) honoring assistant directors and unit production managers for career achievement and service to the DGA. Named after the American director Frank Capra (1897–1991), it was first awarded at the 32nd Directors Guild of America Awards in 1980.

== Recipients ==
Year	Recipient(s)	Ref.
1979	Emmett Emmerson	
1980	Francisco Day	
1981	David Golden and Wallace Worsley Jr.	
1982	William Beaudine Jr. and William C. Gerrity	
1983	No award	
1984	Jane Schimmel and Abby Singer	
1985	No award	
1986	Henry E. Brill	
1987	Alex Hapsas	
1988	No award	
1989	Stanley Ackerman	
1990	Howard W. Koch	
1991	No award	
1992	Willard H. Sheldon	
1993	No award	
1994	Peter A. Runfulo	
1995	No award	
1996	No award	
1997	Bob Jeffords	
1998	Tom Joyner	
1999	Cheryl R. Downey	
2000	No award	
2001	Burt Bluestein	
2002	Yudi Bennett	
2003	Stephen A. Glanzrock	
2004	Herb Adelman	
2005	Jerry H. Ziesmer	
2006	No award	
2007	Liz Ryan	
2008	Kim Kurumada	
2009	Cleve Landsberg	
2010	No award	
2011	Katy Garretson	
2012	Susan Zwerman	
2013	Lee Blaine	
2014	Phillip M. Goldfarb	
2015	Mary Rae Thewlis	
2016	Marie Cantin	
2017	Dwight Williams	
2018	Kathleen McGill	
2019	Duncan S. Henderson	
2020	Brian E. Frankish	
2021	Joseph P. Reidy	
2022	Mark Hansson	
2023	Janet Knutsen	
2024	Thomas J. Whelan	
2025	Gregory G. McCollum	
