= 32nd Primetime Emmy Awards =

Prime time Emmy Awards of 1980

- Date: September 7, 1980 (Ceremony); September 6, 1980 (Creative Arts Awards)
- Location: Pasadena Civic Auditorium, Pasadena, California
- Presented by: Academy of Television Arts and Sciences
- Hosted by: Steve Allen; Dick Clark

Highlights
- Most awards: Lou Grant (5)
- Most nominations: Lou Grant (14)
- Outstanding Comedy Series: Taxi
- Outstanding Drama Series: Lou Grant
- Outstanding Limited Series: Edward & Mrs. Simpson
- Outstanding Variety or Music Program: Baryshnikov on Broadway

Television/radio coverage
- Network: NBC

The 32nd Primetime Emmy Awards were held on Sunday, September 7, 1980, at the Pasadena Civic Auditorium. The awards show was hosted by Steve Allen and Dick Clark and broadcast on NBC, presenting 25 awards. For the second year in a row, the top series awards went to the same shows, Taxi and Lou Grant. Lou Grant was the most successful show of the night winning five major awards. It also received 14 major nominations, tying the record for most major nominations by a drama series, set by Playhouse 90 in 1959.

The ceremony was held in the midst of a strike by members of the Screen Actors Guild; in a show of support for their union, 51 of the 52 nominated performers boycotted the event. Powers Boothe was the only nominated actor to attend; acknowledging his presence in his acceptance speech, he remarked, "This is either the most courageous moment of my career or the stupidest."

== Winners and nominees ==
=== Programs ===
Programs
Outstanding Comedy Series: Taxi (ABC); Barney Miller (ABC); M*A*S*H (CBS); Soap (ABC); WKRP in Cincinnati (CBS)	Outstanding Drama Series: Lou Grant (CBS); Dallas (CBS); Family (ABC); The Rockford Files (NBC); The White Shadow (CBS)
Outstanding Drama or Comedy Special: The Miracle Worker (NBC); All Quiet on the Western Front (CBS); Amber Waves (ABC); Gideon's Trumpet (CBS); Guyana Tragedy: The Story of Jim Jones (CBS)	Outstanding Limited Series: Edward & Mrs. Simpson (Syndicated); Disraeli: Portrait of a Romantic (PBS); The Duchess of Duke Street (PBS); Moviola (NBC)
Outstanding Variety or Music Program: Baryshnikov on Broadway (ABC); The Benny Hill Show (Syndicated); Goldie and Liza Together (CBS); The Muppet Show (Syndicated); Shirley MacLaine... "Every Little Movement" (CBS)

=== Acting ===
==== Lead performances ====
Acting
Outstanding Lead Actor in a Comedy Series: Richard Mulligan as Burt Campbell in Soap (ABC) (Episode: "Episode 51"); Alan Alda as Hawkeye Pierce in M*A*S*H (CBS); Robert Guillaume as Benson DuBois in Benson (ABC); Judd Hirsch as Alex Reiger in Taxi (ABC); Hal Linden as Capt. Barney Miller in Barney Miller (ABC)	Outstanding Lead Actress in a Comedy Series: Cathryn Damon as Mary Campbell in Soap (ABC); Katherine Helmond as Jessica Tate in Soap (ABC); Polly Holliday as Florence Jean "Flo" Castleberry in Flo (CBS); Sheree North as Dotty Wertz in Archie Bunker's Place (CBS); Isabel Sanford as Louise Jefferson in The Jeffersons (CBS)
Outstanding Lead Actor in a Drama Series: Edward Asner as Lou Grant in Lou Grant (CBS) (Episode: "Lou"); James Garner as Jim Rockford in The Rockford Files (NBC); Larry Hagman as J.R. Ewing in Dallas (CBS); Jack Klugman as Dr. Quincy in Quincy, M.E. (NBC)	Outstanding Lead Actress in a Drama Series: Barbara Bel Geddes as Miss Ellie Ewing in Dallas (CBS) (Episode: "Mastectomy"); Lauren Bacall as Kendall Warren in The Rockford Files (NBC) (Episode: "Lions, Tigers, Monkeys and Dogs"); Mariette Hartley as Althea Morgan in The Rockford Files (NBC) (Episode: "Paradise Cove"); Kristy McNichol as Letitia Lawrence in Family (ABC); Sada Thompson as Kate Lawrence in Family (ABC)
Outstanding Lead Actor in a Limited Series or a Special: Powers Boothe as Jim Jones in Guyana Tragedy: The Story of Jim Jones (CBS); Tony Curtis as David O. Selznick in Moviola (NBC) (Episode: "The Scarlett O'Hara War"); Henry Fonda as Clarence Earl Gideon in Gideon's Trumpet (CBS); Jason Robards as President Franklin D. Roosevelt in F.D.R.: The Last Year (NBC)	Outstanding Lead Actress in a Limited Series or a Special: Patty Duke as Annie Sullivan in The Miracle Worker (NBC); Bette Davis as Adele Malone in White Mama (CBS); Melissa Gilbert as Helen Keller in The Miracle Worker (NBC); Lee Remick as Margaret Sullavan in Haywire (CBS)

==== Supporting performances ====
Outstanding Supporting Actor in a Comedy or Variety or Music Series: Harry Morgan as Sherman T. Potter in M*A*S*H (CBS) (Episode: "Old Soldiers"); Mike Farrell as B. J. Hunnicutt in M*A*S*H (CBS); Max Gail as Det. Stan Wojciehowicz in Barney Miller (ABC); Howard Hesseman as Johnny Caravella in WKRP in Cincinnati (CBS); Steve Landesberg as Sgt. Arthur Dietrich in Barney Miller (ABC)	Outstanding Supporting Actress in a Comedy or Variety or Music Series: Loretta Swit as Margaret Houlihan in M*A*S*H (CBS) (Episode: "Are You Now, Margaret?"); Loni Anderson as Jennifer Marlowe in WKRP in Cincinnati (CBS); Polly Holliday as Florence Jean "Flo" Castleberry in Alice (CBS); Inga Swenson as Gretchen Kraus in Benson (ABC)
Outstanding Supporting Actor in a Drama Series: Stuart Margolin as Evelyn "Angel" Martin in The Rockford Files (NBC); Mason Adams as Charlie Hume in Lou Grant (CBS); Noah Beery, Jr. as Joseph Rockford in The Rockford Files (NBC); Robert Walden as Joe Rossi in Lou Grant (CBS)	Outstanding Supporting Actress in a Drama Series: Nancy Marchand as Margaret Pynchon in Lou Grant (CBS) (Episode: "Dogs"); Nina Foch as Mrs. Polk in Lou Grant (CBS) (Episode: "Hollywood"); Linda Kelsey as Billie Newman in Lou Grant (CBS); Jessica Walter as Melanie Townsend McIntyre in Trapper John, M.D. (CBS)
Outstanding Supporting Actor in a Limited Series or a Special: George Grizzard as Floyd Kincaid in The Oldest Living Graduate (NBC); Ernest Borgnine as Stanislaus Katczinsky in All Quiet on the Western Front (CBS); John Cassavetes as Gus Caputo in Flesh and Blood (CBS); Charles Durning as Commissioner Russell Oswald in Attica (ABC); Harold Gould as Louis B. Mayer in Moviola (NBC) (Episode: "The Scarlett O'Hara War")	Outstanding Supporting Actress in a Limited Series or a Special: Mare Winningham as Marlene Burkhardt in Amber Waves (ABC); Eileen Heckart as Eleanor Roosevelt in F.D.R.: The Last Year (NBC); Patricia Neal as Paul's Mother in All Quiet on the Western Front (CBS); Carrie Nye as Tallulah Bankhead in Moviola (NBC) (Episode: "The Scarlett O'Hara War")

=== Directing ===
Directing
Outstanding Directing in a Comedy Series: Taxi (ABC): "Louie and the Nice Girl" – James Burrows; M*A*S*H (CBS): "Bottle Fatigue" – Burt Metcalfe; M*A*S*H (CBS): "Dreams" – Alan Alda; M*A*S*H (CBS): "Period of Adjustment" – Charles S. Dubin; M*A*S*H (CBS): "Stars and Stripes" – Harry Morgan	Outstanding Directing in a Drama Series: Lou Grant (CBS): "Cop" – Roger Young; Lou Grant (CBS): "Andrew, Part II: Trial" – Peter Levin; Lou Grant (CBS): "Hollywood" – Burt Brinckerhoff; Lou Grant (CBS): "Influence" – Gene Reynolds; Skag (NBC): "Pilot" – Frank Perry
Outstanding Directing in a Variety or Music Program: Baryshnikov on Broadway (ABC) – Dwight Hemion; The Big Show (NBC): "Mariette Hartley and Dean Martin" – Steve Binder; John Denver and the Muppets: A Christmas Together (ABC) – Tony Charmoli; The Muppet Show (Syndicated): "Liza Minnelli" – Peter Harris	Outstanding Directing in a Limited Series or a Special: Attica (ABC) – Marvin J. Chomsky; All Quiet on the Western Front (CBS) – Delbert Mann; Amber Waves (ABC) – Joseph Sargent; Guyana Tragedy: The Story of Jim Jones (CBS) – William A. Graham; Moviola (NBC): "The Scarlett O'Hara War" – John Erman

=== Writing ===
Writing
Outstanding Writing in a Comedy Series: Barney Miller (ABC): "Photographer" – Bob Colleary; The Associates (ABC): "The Censors" – Stan Daniels and Ed. Weinberger; The Associates (ABC): "The First Day" – Story by : Charlie Hauck Teleplay by : Michael Leeson; M*A*S*H (CBS): "Good Bye, Radar Part II" – Ken Levine and David Isaacs; Taxi (ABC): "Honor Thy Father" – Glen Charles and Les Charles	Outstanding Writing in a Drama Series: Lou Grant (CBS): "Cop" – Seth Freeman; Lou Grant (CBS): "Brushfire" – Allan Burns and Gene Reynolds; Lou Grant (CBS): "Lou" – Michele Gallery; Skag (NBC): "Pilot" – Abby Mann; Tenspeed and Brown Shoe (ABC): "Pilot" – Stephen J. Cannell
Outstanding Writing in a Variety or Music Program: Shirley MacLaine... "Every Little Movement" (CBS) – Buz Kohan and Shirley MacLaine; Carol Burnett & Company (ABC): "Sally Field"; Goldie and Liza Together (CBS) – Fred Ebb; The Muppet Show (Syndicated): "Alan Arkin"; Saturday Night Live (NBC): "Teri Garr"	Outstanding Writing in a Limited Series or a Special: Off the Minnesota Strip (ABC) – David Chase; Amber Waves (ABC) – Ken Trevey; Attica (ABC) – James S. Henerson; Gideon's Trumpet (CBS) – David W. Rintels; Moviola (NBC): "This Year's Blonde" – James Lee

== Most major nominations ==
Networks with multiple major nominations (Note: "Major" constitutes the categories listed above: Program, Acting, Directing, and Writing. Does not include the technical categories.)
Network	Number of Nominations
CBS	53
NBC	23
ABC	19

Programs with multiple major nominations
Program	Category	Network	Number of Nominations
Lou Grant	Drama	CBS	14
M*A*S*H	Comedy	CBS	10
The Rockford Files	Drama	NBC	6
Moviola'	Limited	NBC	6
Barney Miller	Comedy	ABC	5
All Quiet on the Western Front	Special	CBS	4
Amber Waves	Special	ABC	4
Soap	Comedy	ABC	4
Taxi	Comedy	ABC	4
Attica	Special	ABC	3
Dallas	Drama	CBS	3
Family	Drama	ABC	3
Gideon's Trumpet	Special	CBS	3
Guyana Tragedy: The Story of Jim Jones	Special	CBS	3
The Miracle Worker	Special	NBC	3
The Muppet Show	Variety	Syndicated	3
WKRP in Cincinnati	Comedy	CBS	3
The Associates	Comedy	ABC	2
Baryshnikov on Broadway	Variety	ABC	2
Benson	Comedy	ABC	2
F.D.R.: The Last Year	Special	NBC	2
Goldie and Liza Together	Variety	CBS	2
Shirley MacLaine... 'Every Little Movement'	Variety	CBS	2
Skag	Drama	NBC	2

== Most major awards ==
Networks with multiple major awards
Network	Number of Awards
ABC	10
CBS	10
NBC	4

Programs with multiple major awards
Program	Category	Network	Number of Awards
Lou Grant	Drama	CBS	5
Baryshnikov on Broadway	Variety	ABC	2
M*A*S*H	Comedy	CBS	2
The Miracle Worker	Special	NBC	2
Soap	Comedy	ABC	2
Taxi	Comedy	ABC	2
