= Directors Guild of America Award for Outstanding Directorial Achievement in Documentary =

Annual award for documentary directing

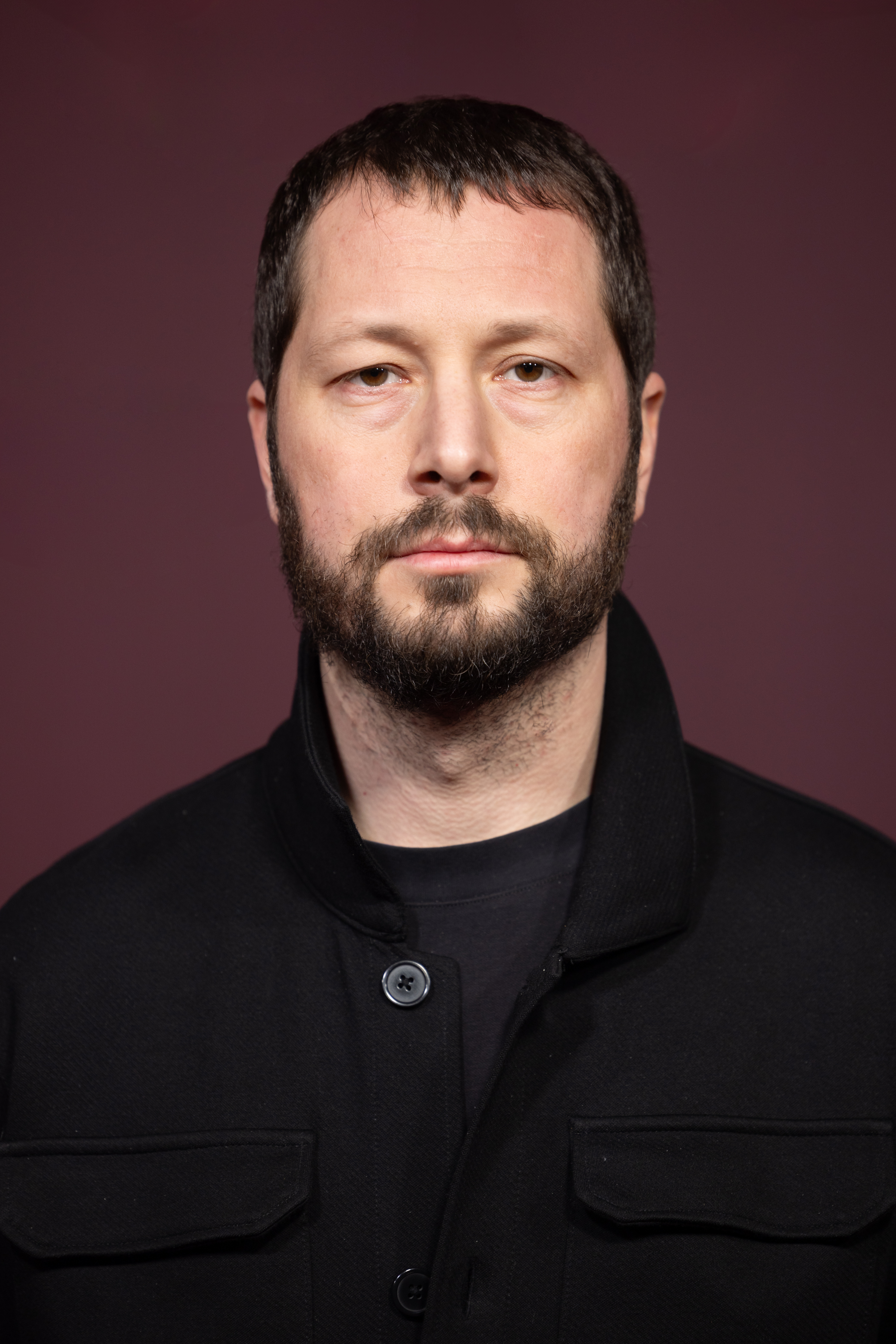
- The 2025 recipients: Mstyslav Chernov
- Awarded for: Outstanding Directorial Achievement in Documentary
- Country: United States
- Presented by: Directors Guild of America
- First award: 1991
- Currently held by: Mstyslav Chernov for 2000 Meters to Andriivka (2025)
- Website: https://www.dga.org

The Directors Guild of America Award for Outstanding Directorial Achievement in Documentary is one of the annual Directors Guild of America Awards given by the Directors Guild of America. It was first awarded at the 44th Directors Guild of America Awards in 1992. The DGA Documentary Awards Committee is currently co-chaired by Yance Ford and Patrick Creadon.

Ari Folman's Waltz with Bashir remains the only animated film to ever won a DGA award.

== Winners and nominees ==
=== 1990s ===
Year	Winners and nominees	Film	Ref.
1991 (44th)	Barbara Kopple	American Dream	
1991 (44th)	Eleanor Coppola, Fax Bahr, and George Hickenlooper	Hearts of Darkness: A Filmmaker's Apocalypse	
1991 (44th)	Albert Maysles, Bob Eisenhardt, Susan Froemke, and Peter Gelb	Soldiers of Music: Rostropovich Returns to Russia	
1991 (44th)	Alan Raymond	Doing Time: Life Inside the Big House	
1992 (45th)	Joe Berlinger and Bruce Sinofsky	Brother's Keeper	
1992 (45th)	Ric Burns	The Donner Party	
1992 (45th)	Mark Stouffer	Braving Alaska	
1993 (46th)	Barbara Kopple	Fallen Champ: The Untold Story of Mike Tyson	
1993 (46th)	Shari Cookson	Skinheads USA: Soldiers of the Race War	
1993 (46th)	Bruce Kuerten and John DiJulio	From Fields of Promise	
1993 (46th)	Susan Raymond	I Am a Promise: The Children of Stanton Elementary School	
1993 (46th)	Susan Steinberg	American Masters for "Paul Simon: Born at the Right Time"	
1994 (47th)	Steve James	Hoop Dreams	
1994 (47th)	Dan Geller and Dayna Goldfine	Frosh: Nine Months in a Freshman Dorm	
1994 (47th)	Jyll Johnstone	Martha & Ethel	
1994 (47th)	Susan Todd and Andrew Young	Lives in Hazard	
1994 (47th)	Bethany Yarrow	Mama Awethu!	
1995 (48th)	Terry Zwigoff	Crumb	
1995 (48th)	Deborah Hoffmann	Complaints of a Dutiful Daughter	
1995 (48th)	Freida Lee Mock	Maya Lin: A Strong Clear Vision	
1995 (48th)	Bill Van Daalen	Indianapolis: Ship of Doom	
1995 (48th)	Helen Whitney	American Masters for "Richard Avedon: Darkness and Light"	
1996 (49th)	Al Pacino	Looking for Richard	
1996 (49th)	Joe Berlinger and Bruce Sinofsky	Paradise Lost: The Child Murders at Robin Hood Hills	
1996 (49th)	Leon Gast	When We Were Kings	
1996 (49th)	Jeanne Jordan and Steven Ascher	Troublesome Creek: A Midwestern	
1996 (49th)	Isaac Mizrahi	The Great War and the Shaping of the 20th Century for "Slaughter"	
1997 (50th)	Michael Uys and Lexy Lovell	Riding the Rails	
1997 (50th)	Ellen Hovde and Muffie Meyer	Liberty! The American Revolution for "Blows Must Decide"	
1997 (50th)	John O'Hagan	Wonderland	
1997 (50th)	Michèle Ohayon	Colors Straight Up	
1997 (50th)	Peter Rosen	First Person Singular: I.M. Pei	
1998 (51st)	Jerry Blumenthal, Peter Gilbert and Gordon Quinn	Vietnam, Long Time Coming	
1998 (51st)	Matthew Diamond	Dancemaker	
1998 (51st)	Susan Lacy	American Masters for "Leonard Bernstein: Reaching for the Note"	
1998 (51st)	Nigel Noble	Great Performances for "Porgy and Bess: An American Voice"	
1998 (51st)	Kyra Thompson	Dying to Tell the Story	
1999 (52nd)	Nanette Burstein and Brett Morgen	On the Ropes	
1999 (52nd)	Barry W. Blaustein	Beyond the Mat	
1999 (52nd)	Marc Levin	Thug Life in D.C.	
1999 (52nd)	Errol Morris	Mr. Death: The Rise and Fall of Fred A. Leuchter, Jr.	
1999 (52nd)	Gary Weimberg	The Double Life of Ernesto Gomez-Gomez	

=== 2000s ===
Year	Winners and nominees	Film	Ref.
2000 (53rd)	Charles Braverman	High School Boot Camp	
2000 (53rd)	Laurie Collyer	Nuyorican Dream	
2000 (53rd)	Mark Lewis	The Natural History of the Chicken	
2000 (53rd)	Michael Mierendorf	Broken Child	
2000 (53rd)	David de Vries	The True Story of the Bridge on the River Kwai	
2001 (54th)	Chris Hegedus and Jehane Noujaim	Startup.com	
2001 (54th)	Charles Braverman	Rocky and Rolanda	
2001 (54th)	Stephen Ives	Amato: A Love Affair with Opera	
2001 (54th)	Frances Reid and Deborah Hoffmann	Long Night's Journey Into Day	
2001 (54th)	Martin J. Spinelli	Life on Jupiter: The Story of Jens Nygaard, Musician	
2002 (55th)	Tasha Oldham	The Smith Family	
2002 (55th)	Charles Braverman	Bottom of the Ninth	
2002 (55th)	Rebecca Cammisa and Rob Fruchtman	Sister Helen	
2002 (55th)	Malcolm Clarke and Stuart Sender	Prisoner of Paradise	
2002 (55th)	Leah Mahan	Sweet Old Song	
2003 (56th)	Nathaniel Kahn	My Architect	
2003 (56th)	Sam Green and Bill Siegel	The Weather Underground	
2003 (56th)	Andrew Jarecki	Capturing the Friedmans	
2003 (56th)	Errol Morris	The Fog of War	
2003 (56th)	José Padilha	Bus 174	
2004 (57th)	Byambasuren Davaa and Luigi Falorni	The Story of the Weeping Camel	
2004 (57th)	Zana Briski and Ross Kauffman	Born into Brothels	
2004 (57th)	Ross McElwee	Bright Leaves	
2004 (57th)	Michael Moore	Fahrenheit 9/11	
2004 (57th)	Jehane Noujaim	Control Room	
2005 (58th)	Werner Herzog	Grizzly Man	
2005 (58th)	Kief Davidson and Richard Ladkani	The Devil's Miner	
2005 (58th)	Sean McAllister	The Liberace of Baghdad	
2005 (58th)	Rupert Murray	Unknown White Male	
2005 (58th)	Brent Renaud and Craig Renaud	Off to War: Welcome to Baghdad	
2006 (59th)	Arūnas Matelis	Before Flying Back to Earth	
2006 (59th)	Amy J. Berg	Deliver Us from Evil	
2006 (59th)	Michael Glawogger	Workingman's Death	
2006 (59th)	James Longley	Iraq in Fragments	
2006 (59th)	Jean-Henri Meunier	Ici Najac, A Vous La Terre	
2007 (60th)	Asger Leth	Ghosts of Cité Soleil	
2007 (60th)	Ken Burns and Lynn Novick	The War	
2007 (60th)	Alex Gibney	Taxi to the Dark Side	
2007 (60th)	Richard E. Robbins	Operation Homecoming: Writing the Wartime Experience	
2007 (60th)	Barbet Schroeder	Terror's Advocate	
2008 (61st)	Ari Folman	Waltz with Bashir	
2008 (61st)	Peter Gilbert and Steve James	At the Death House Door	
2008 (61st)	Elizabeth Farnsworth and Patricio Lanfranco	The Judge and the General	
2008 (61st)	James Marsh	Man on Wire	
2008 (61st)	Gonzalo Arijón	Stranded: I've Come from a Plane that Crashed in the Mountains	
2009 (62nd)	Louie Psihoyos	The Cove	
2009 (62nd)	Sacha Gervasi	Anvil! The Story of Anvil	
2009 (62nd)	Mai Iskander	Garbage Dreams	
2009 (62nd)	Robert Kenner	Food, Inc.	
2009 (62nd)	Geoffrey Smith	The English Surgeon	
2009 (62nd)	Agnès Varda	The Beaches of Agnès	

=== 2010s ===
Year	Winners and nominees	Film	Ref.
2010 (63rd)	Charles Ferguson	Inside Job	
2010 (63rd)	Lixin Fan	Last Train Home	
2010 (63rd)	Alex Gibney	Client 9: The Rise and Fall of Eliot Spitzer	
2010 (63rd)	Davis Guggenheim	Waiting for "Superman"	
2010 (63rd)	Tim Hetherington and Sebastian Junger	Restrepo	
2011 (64th)	James Marsh	Project Nim	
2011 (64th)	Joe Berlinger and Bruce Sinofsky	Paradise Lost 3: Purgatory	
2011 (64th)	Steve James	The Interrupters	
2011 (64th)	Richard Press	Bill Cunningham New York	
2011 (64th)	Martin Scorsese	George Harrison: Living in the Material World	
2012 (65th)	Malik Bendjelloul	Searching for Sugar Man	
2012 (65th)	Kirby Dick	The Invisible War	
2012 (65th)	David France	How to Survive a Plague	
2012 (65th)	Lauren Greenfield	The Queen of Versailles	
2012 (65th)	Alison Klayman	Ai Weiwei: Never Sorry	
2013 (66th)	Jehane Noujaim	The Square	
2013 (66th)	Zachary Heinzerling	Cutie and the Boxer	
2013 (66th)	Joshua Oppenheimer	The Act of Killing	
2013 (66th)	Sarah Polley	Stories We Tell	
2013 (66th)	Lucy Walker	The Crash Reel	
2014 (67th)	Laura Poitras	Citizenfour	
2014 (67th)	Dan Krauss	The Kill Team	
2014 (67th)	John Maloof and Charlie Siskel	Finding Vivian Maier	
2014 (67th)	Jesse Moss	The Overnighters	
2014 (67th)	Orlando von Einsiedel	Virunga	
2015 (68th)	Matthew Heineman	Cartel Land	
2015 (68th)	Jimmy Chin and Elizabeth Chai Vasarhelyi	Meru	
2015 (68th)	Liz Garbus	What Happened, Miss Simone?	
2015 (68th)	Alex Gibney	Going Clear: Scientology and the Prison of Belief	
2015 (68th)	Asif Kapadia	Amy	
2016 (69th)	Ezra Edelman	O.J.: Made in America	
2016 (69th)	Otto Bell	The Eagle Huntress	
2016 (69th)	Josh Kriegman and Elyse Steinberg	Weiner	
2016 (69th)	Raoul Peck	I Am Not Your Negro	
2016 (69th)	Roger Ross Williams	Life, Animated	
2017 (70th)	Matthew Heineman	City of Ghosts	
2017 (70th)	Ken Burns and Lynn Novick	The Vietnam War	
2017 (70th)	Bryan Fogel	Icarus	
2017 (70th)	Steve James	Abacus: Small Enough to Jail	
2017 (70th)	Errol Morris	Wormwood	
2018 (71st)	Tim Wardle	Three Identical Strangers	
2018 (71st)	Morgan Neville	Won't You Be My Neighbor?	
2018 (71st)	RaMell Ross	Hale County This Morning, This Evening	
2018 (71st)	Elizabeth Chai Vasarhelyi and Jimmy Chin	Free Solo	
2018 (71st)	Betsy West and Julie Cohen	RBG	
2019 (72nd)	Steven Bognar and Julia Reichert	American Factory	
2019 (72nd)	Feras Fayyad	The Cave	
2019 (72nd)	Alex Holmes	Maiden	
2019 (72nd)	Ljubomir Stefanov and Tamara Kotevska	Honeyland	
2019 (72nd)	Nanfu Wang and Jialing Zhang	One Child Nation	

=== 2020s ===
Year	Winners and nominees	Film	Ref.
2020 (73rd)	Michael Dweck & Gregory Kershaw	The Truffle Hunters	
2020 (73rd)	Pippa Ehrlich & James Reed	My Octopus Teacher	
2020 (73rd)	David France	Welcome to Chechnya	
2020 (73rd)	Amanda McBaine & Jesse Moss	Boys State	
2020 (73rd)	Benjamin Ree	The Painter and the Thief	
2021 (74th)	Stanley Nelson Jr.	Attica	
2021 (74th)	Jessica Kingdon	Ascension	
2021 (74th)	Raoul Peck	Exterminate All the Brutes	
2021 (74th)	Ahmir "Questlove" Thompson	Summer of Soul (...Or, When the Revolution Could Not Be Televised)	
2021 (74th)	Elizabeth Chai Vasarhelyi and Jimmy Chin	The Rescue	
2022 (75th)	Sara Dosa	Fire of Love	
2022 (75th)	Matthew Heineman	Retrograde	
2022 (75th)	Laura Poitras	All the Beauty and the Bloodshed	
2022 (75th)	Daniel Roher	Navalny	
2022 (75th)	Shaunak Sen	All That Breathes	
2023 (76th)	Mstyslav Chernov	20 Days in Mariupol	
2023 (76th)	Moses Bwayo and Christopher Sharp	Bobi Wine: The People's President	
2023 (76th)	Madeleine Gavin	Beyond Utopia	
2023 (76th)	Davis Guggenheim	Still: A Michael J. Fox Movie	
2023 (76th)	D. Smith	Kokomo City	
2024 (77th)	Brendan Bellomo and Slava Leontyev	Porcelain War	
2024 (77th)	Julian Brave NoiseCat and Emily Kassie	Sugarcane	
2024 (77th)	Johan Grimonprez	Soundtrack to a Coup d'Etat	
2024 (77th)	Ibrahim Nash'at	Hollywoodgate	
2024 (77th)	Natalie Rae and Angela Patton	Daughters	
2025 (78th)	Mstyslav Chernov	2000 Meters to Andriivka	
2025 (78th)	Geeta Gandbhir	The Perfect Neighbor	
2025 (78th)	Sara Khaki and Mohammadreza Eyni	Cutting Through Rocks	
2025 (78th)	Elizabeth Lo	Mistress Dispeller	
2025 (78th)	Laura Poitras and Mark Obenhaus	Cover-Up	

== Multiple wins and nominations ==
Wins	Nominations	Name (Year)
2	3	Matthew Heineman (2015, 2017, 2022)
2	3	Jehane Noujaim (2001, 2004, 2013)
2	2	Mstyslav Chernov (2023, 2025)
2	2	Barbara Kopple (1991, 1993)
1	4	Steve James (1994, 2008, 2011, 2017)
1	3	Joe Berlinger (1992, 2006, 2011)
1	3	Bruce Sinofsky (1992, 2006, 2011)
1	3	Charles Braverman (2000, 2001, 2002)
1	3	Laura Poitras (2014, 2022, 2025)
1	2	Peter Gilbert (1998, 2008)
1	2	James Marsh (2008, 2011)
0	3	Errol Morris (1999, 2003, 2017)
0	3	Alex Gibney (2007, 2010, 2015)
0	3	Jimmy Chin (2015, 2018, 2021)
0	3	Elizabeth Chai Vasarhelyi (2015, 2018, 2021)
0	2	Deborah Hoffmann (1995, 2001)
0	2	Ken Burns (2007, 2017)
0	2	Lynn Novick (2007, 2017)
0	2	Davis Guggenheim (2010, 2023)
0	2	David France (2012, 2020)
0	2	Jesse Moss (2014, 2020)
0	2	Raoul Peck (2016, 2021)

== See also ==
- Academy Award for Best Documentary Feature
