= 37th Directors Guild of America Awards =

- Date: March 9, 1985
- Location: The Beverly Hilton, Los Angeles, California; Plaza Hotel, New York City
- Country: United States
- Presented by: Directors Guild of America

Highlights
- Best Director Feature Film: Amadeus – Miloš Forman
- Website: https://www.dga.org/Awards/History/1980s/1984.aspx?value=1984

The 37th Directors Guild of America Awards, honoring the outstanding directorial achievements in film and television in 1984, were presented on March 9, 1985 at the Beverly Hilton and the Plaza Hotel. The feature film nominees were announced on February 1, 1985, nominees in seven television categories were announced on February 5, 1985, and the commercial nominees were announced on February 12, 1985.

== Winners and nominees ==
=== Film ===
Feature Film

Miloš Forman – Amadeus

- Robert Benton – Places in the Heart
- Norman Jewison – A Soldier's Story
- Roland Joffé – The Killing Fields
- David Lean – A Passage to India

=== Television ===
Drama Series

Thomas Carter – Hill Street Blues for "The Rise and Fall of Paul the Wall"

- David Anspaugh – St. Elsewhere for "Fade to White"
- Mark Tinker – St. Elsewhere for "Sweet Dreams"
Comedy Series

Jay Sandrich – The Cosby Show for "Pilot"

- James Burrows – Cheers for "I Call Your Name"
- Bill Persky – Kate & Allie for "Landlady"
Miniseries or TV Film

Daniel Petrie – The Dollmaker

- Robert Greenwald – The Burning Bed
- Randa Haines – Something About Amelia
Musical Variety

Don Mischer and Twyla Tharp – Great Performances for "Baryshnikov By Tharp"

- Tony Charmoli – Olympic Gala
- Terry Jastrow – 1984 Summer Olympics opening ceremony
Daytime Drama

Joan Darling – ABC Afterschool Special for "Mom's on Strike"

- Robert Chenault – ABC Afterschool Special for "The Hero Who Couldn't Read"
- Joanna Lee – CBS Schoolbreak Special for "Hear Me Cry"
Documentary/Actuality

Alfred R. Kelman – The Body Human: The Journey Within

- Merrill Brockway – Great Performances for "Balanchine (Parts 1 & 2)"
- Howard Enders – Ellis Island: The Odyssey of a Dream
Sports

Sandy Grossman – Super Bowl XVIII

- Larry Kamm, Bob Lanning, and Norman Samet – Gymnastics at the 1984 Summer Olympics
- Doug Wilson – Figure skating at the 1984 Winter Olympics

=== Commercials ===
Commercials

Stuart Hagmann – The Church of Jesus Christ of Latter-day Saints' "Right Moment", IBM's "Skates", and McDonald's' "Stranger in the House"

- William Dear – Budweiser's "3D" and "Window Washers, Frontier's "Concourse of Doom", Honda's "Devo", and Bell Atlantic's "Dragnet"
- Leslie Dektor – Levi's' "Blues", John Player & Sons' "Own the Night", and NutraSweet's "Wait"
- Richard Levine – The Church of Jesus Christ of Latter-day Saints' "Good Samaritans" and Sonecor's "Radio Telescope"
- Michael Ulick – Coca-Cola's "First Job", American Greetings' "Peace", and Kodak's "Statue of Liberty"

=== D.W. Griffith Award ===
- Billy Wilder

=== Frank Capra Achievement Award ===
- Jane Schimel
- Abby Singer

=== Robert B. Aldrich Service Award ===
- Elliot Silverstein

=== Honorary Life Member ===
- Tom Donovan
