= Directors Guild of America Award for Outstanding Directorial Achievement in Children's Programs =

Annual award for television directing

- Awarded for: Outstanding Directorial Achievement in Children's Programs
- Country: United States
- Presented by: Directors Guild of America
- First award: 1996
- Final award: 2024

The Directors Guild of America Award for Outstanding Directorial Achievement in Children's Programs is one of the annual Directors Guild of America Awards given by the Directors Guild of America (DGA). It was first awarded at the 49th Directors Guild of America Awards in 1997. Before 1996, most children's programs competed in the Drama Show Day category before it retired in 1994.

In July 2025, the DGA announced that the Children's Programs category would no longer be presented due to "an increasing decline in submissions", making the 77th Directors Guild of America Awards the final ceremony to feature it.

== Winners and nominees ==
=== 1990s ===
Year	Program	Winners and nominees	Network	Ref.
1996 (49th)	Salt Water Moose	Stuart Margolin	Showtime	
1996 (49th)	ABC Afterschool Special (Episode: "Educating Mom")	Kristoffer Tabori	ABC	
1996 (49th)	Bailey Kipper's P.O.V. (Episode: "Talk Ain't Cheap")	Arthur Albert	CBS	
1996 (49th)	Robin of Locksley	Michael Kennedy	Showtime	
1996 (49th)	Sports Theater with Shaquille O'Neal (Episode: "4 Points")	Brian Robbins	Nickelodeon	
1997 (50th)	Sports Theater with Shaquille O'Neal (Episode: "First Time")	Brian Robbins	Nickelodeon	
1997 (50th)	Goosebumps (Episode: "The Perfect School")	Ron Oliver	Fox	
1997 (50th)	Kenan & Kel (Episode: "Haven't Got Time for the Paint")	Howard Storm	Nickelodeon	
1997 (50th)	The Secret World of Alex Mack (Episode: "Lies and Secrets")	Shawn Levy	Nickelodeon	
1997 (50th)	The Wonderful World of Disney (Episode: "Toothless")	Melanie Mayron	ABC	
1998 (51st)	Bear in the Big Blue House (Episode: "Love is All You Need")	Mitchell Kriegman	Disney Channel	
1998 (51st)	Goosebumps (Episode: "Cry of the Cat")	Ron Oliver	Fox	
1998 (51st)	Honey, I Shrunk the Kids (Episode: "From Honey with Love")	Victoria Hochberg	First-run syndication	
1998 (51st)	The Sweetest Gift	Stuart Margolin	Showtime	
1998 (51st)	The Teen Files (Episode: "Smoking: Truth or Dare")	Allison Grodner	First-run syndication	
1999 (52nd)	Goodnight Moon and Other Sleepy Time Tales	Amy Schatz	HBO	
1999 (52nd)	Bear in the Big Blue House (Episode: "A Berry Merry Christmas")	Mitchell Kriegman	Disney Channel	
1999 (52nd)	CinderElmo	Bruce Leddy	Fox	
1999 (52nd)	Cousin Skeeter (Episode: "Dirty Laundry")	Jonathan Winfrey	Nickelodeon	
1999 (52nd)	The Wonderful World of Disney (Episode: "H-E Double Hockey Sticks")	Randall Miller	ABC	

=== 2000s ===
Year	Program	Winners and nominees	Network	Ref.
2000 (53rd)	Miracle in Lane 2	Greg Beeman	Disney Channel	
2000 (53rd)	Even Stevens (Episode: "Easy Way")	Sean McNamara	Disney Channel	
2000 (53rd)	Even Stevens (Episode: "Take My Sister...Please")	Paul Hoen	Disney Channel	
2000 (53rd)	The Color of Friendship	Kevin Hooks	Disney Channel	
2000 (53rd)	The Wonderful World of Disney (Episode: "Santa Who?")	William Dear	ABC	
2001 (54th)	'Twas the Night: A Holiday Celebration	Amy Schatz	HBO	
2001 (54th)	Even Stevens (Episode: "Very Scary Story")	Sean McNamara	Disney Channel	
2001 (54th)	My Louisiana Sky	Adam Arkin	Showtime	
2001 (54th)	They Call Me Sirr	Robert Munic	Showtime	
2001 (54th)	Walter and Henry	Daniel Petrie	Showtime	
2002 (55th)	Bang Bang You're Dead	Guy Ferland	Showtime	
2002 (55th)	Even Stevens (Episode: "Band on the Roof")	Gregory Hobson	Disney Channel	
2002 (55th)	I Was a Teenage Faust	Thom Eberhardt	Showtime	
2002 (55th)	A Ring of Endless Light	Greg Beeman	Disney Channel	
2002 (55th)	Through a Child's Eyes: September 11, 2001	Amy Schatz	HBO	
2003 (56th)	The Wonderful World of Disney (Episode: "Eloise at Christmastime")	Kevin Lima	ABC	
2003 (56th)	The Cheetah Girls	Oz Scott	Disney Channel	
2003 (56th)	The Even Stevens Movie	Sean McNamara	Disney Channel	
2003 (56th)	The Wonderful World of Disney (Episode: "Sounder")	Kevin Hooks	ABC	
2003 (56th)	A Time for Dancing	Peter Gilbert	Showtime	
2004 (57th)	Going to the Mat	Stuart Gillard	Disney Channel	
2004 (57th)	Crown Heights	Jeremy Kagan	Showtime	
2004 (57th)	Jack	Lee Rose	Showtime	
2004 (57th)	Searching for David's Heart	Paul Hoen	ABC Family	
2004 (57th)	Tiger Cruise	Duwayne Dunham	Disney Channel	
2005 (58th)	Edge of America	Chris Eyre	Showtime	
2005 (58th)	Buffalo Dreams	David Jackson	Disney Channel	
2005 (58th)	Flight 29 Down (Episode: "The Pits")	D. J. MacHale	NBC	
2005 (58th)	I Have Tourette's but Tourette's Doesn't Have Me	Ellen Goosenberg Kent	HBO	
2005 (58th)	Speak	Jessica Sharzer	Showtime	
2006 (59th)	High School Musical	Kenny Ortega	Disney Channel	
2006 (59th)	The Cutting Edge: Going for the Gold	Sean McNamara	ABC Family	
2006 (59th)	Molly: An American Girl on the Home Front	Joyce Chopra	Disney Channel	
2006 (59th)	Phil of the Future (Episode: "Not So Great Great Great Grandpa")	Fred Savage	Disney Channel	
2006 (59th)	The Year Without a Santa Claus	Ron Underwood	NBC	
2007 (60th)	Jump In!	Paul Hoen	Disney Channel	
2007 (60th)	GoingGreen: Every Home an Eco-Home	Judith Vogelsang	PBS	
2007 (60th)	High School Musical 2	Kenny Ortega	Disney Channel	
2007 (60th)	Lincoln Heights (Episode: "That Feeling We Have")	Andy Wolk	ABC Family	
2007 (60th)	Wizards of Waverly Place (Episode: "The Crazy 10-Minute Sale")	Fred Savage	Disney Channel	
2008 (61st)	Classical Baby (Episode: "The Poetry Show")	Amy Schatz	HBO	
2008 (61st)	The American Mall	Shawn Ku	MTV	
2008 (61st)	Camp Rock	Matthew Diamond	Disney Channel	
2008 (61st)	The Cheetah Girls: One World	Paul Hoen	Disney Channel	
2008 (61st)	Minutemen	Lev L. Spiro	Disney Channel	
2009 (62nd)	Princess Protection Program	Allison Liddi-Brown	Disney Channel	
2009 (62nd)	An American Girl: Chrissa Stands Strong	Martha Coolidge	HBO	
2009 (62nd)	Zeke and Luther (Episode: "Pilot")	Fred Savage	Disney XD	
2009 (62nd)	Hard Times for an American Girl: The Great Depression	Amy Schatz	HBO	
2009 (62nd)	Lincoln Heights (Episode: "Time To Let Go")	Andy Wolk	ABC Family	

=== 2010s ===
Year	Program	Winners and nominees	Network	Ref.
2010 (63rd)	The Boy Who Cried Werewolf	Eric Bross	Nickelodeon	
2010 (63rd)	Avalon High	Stuart Gillard	Disney Channel	
2010 (63rd)	Camp Rock 2: The Final Jam	Paul Hoen	Disney Channel	
2010 (63rd)	Secrets of the Mountain	Douglas Barr	NBC	
2010 (63rd)	StarStruck	Michael Grossman	Disney Channel	
2010 (63rd)	Unnatural History (Episode: "Pilot")	Mikael Salomon	Cartoon Network	
2011 (64th)	A Child's Garden of Poetry	Amy Schatz	HBO	
2011 (64th)	Best Player	Damon Santostefano	Nickelodeon	
2011 (64th)	Fred 2: Night of the Living Fred	John Fortenberry	Nickelodeon	
2011 (64th)	Geek Charming	Jeffrey Hornaday	Disney Channel	
2011 (64th)	Lemonade Mouth	Patricia Riggen	Disney Channel	
2011 (64th)	Sharpay's Fabulous Adventure	Michael Lembeck	Disney Channel	
2012 (65th)	Let It Shine	Paul Hoen	Disney Channel	
2012 (65th)	Big Time Movie	Savage Steve Holland	Nickelodeon	
2012 (65th)	Don't Divorce Me! Kids' Rules for Parents on Divorce	Amy Schatz	HBO	
2012 (65th)	Fred 3: Camp Fred	Jonathan Judge	Nickelodeon	
2012 (65th)	Girl vs. Monster	Stuart Gillard	Disney Channel	
2013 (66th)	An Apology to Elephants	Amy Schatz	HBO	
2013 (66th)	A.N.T. Farm (Episode: "influANTces")	Adam Weissman	Disney Channel	
2013 (66th)	Jinxed	Stephen Herek	Nickelodeon	
2013 (66th)	Swindle	Jonathan Judge	Nickelodeon	
2013 (66th)	Teen Beach Movie	Jeffrey Hornaday	Disney Channel	
2014 (67th)	100 Things to Do Before High School (Episode: "Pilot")	Jonathan Judge	Nickelodeon	
2014 (67th)	An American Girl: Isabelle Dances Into the Spotlight	Vince Marcello	Disney Channel	
2014 (67th)	How to Build a Better Boy	Paul Hoen	Disney Channel	
2014 (67th)	Saving My Tomorrow (Episodes: "Part 1" and "Part 2")	Amy Schatz	HBO	
2014 (67th)	Sesame Street (Episode: "4504 Numericon")	Joey Mazzarino	PBS	
2015 (68th)	Descendants	Kenny Ortega	Disney Channel	
2015 (68th)	Gortimer Gibbon's Life on Normal Street (Episode: "Gortimer and the Vengeful Violinist")	Sasie Sealy	Amazon	
2015 (68th)	Invisible Sister	Paul Hoen	Disney Channel	
2015 (68th)	Saving My Tomorrow (Episode: "Part 3")	Amy Schatz	HBO	
2015 (68th)	Sesame Street (Episode: "The Cookie Thief")	Joey Mazzarino	PBS	
2016 (69th)	An American Girl Story – Melody 1963: Love Has to Win	Tina Mabry	Amazon	
2016 (69th)	Adventures in Babysitting	John Schultz	Disney Channel	
2016 (69th)	Gortimer Gibbon's Life on Normal Street (Episode: "Gortimer and the Jacks of All Trades")	Alethea Jones	Amazon	
2016 (69th)	The Kicks (Episode: "Pilot")	Liz Allen	Amazon	
2016 (69th)	A Nutcracker Christmas	Michael Lembeck	Hallmark Channel	
2017 (70th)	Anne with an E (Episode: "Your Will Shall Decide Your Destiny")	Niki Caro	Netflix	
2017 (70th)	15: A Quinceañera Story: Zoey	Matthew O'Neill and Thalia Sodi	HBO	
2017 (70th)	An American Girl Story: Summer Camp, Friends for Life	Alison McDonald	Amazon	
2017 (70th)	Just Add Magic (Episode: "Just Add Meddling")	Lily Mariye	Amazon	
2017 (70th)	The Magical Wand Chase: A Sesame Street Special	Benjamin Lehmann	HBO	
2018 (71st)	When You Wish Upon a Pickle: A Sesame Street Special	Jack Jameson	HBO	
2018 (71st)	The Dangerous Book for Boys (Episode: "How to Walk on the Moon")	Greg Mottola	Amazon	
2018 (71st)	A Series of Unfortunate Events (Episode: "The Ersatz Elevator: Part 1")	Bo Welch	Netflix	
2018 (71st)	A Series of Unfortunate Events (Episode: "The Hostile Hospital: Part 1")	Allan Arkush	Netflix	
2018 (71st)	A Series of Unfortunate Events (Episode: "The Vile Village: Part 1")	Barry Sonnenfeld	Netflix	
2019 (72nd)	Song of Parkland	Amy Schatz	HBO	
2019 (72nd)	Are You Afraid of the Dark? (Episode: "Part One: Submitted for Your Approval")	Dean Israelite	Nickelodeon	
2019 (72nd)	Ghostwriter (Episode: "Ghost in Wonderland: Part 1")	Luke Matheny	Apple TV+	
2019 (72nd)	A Series of Unfortunate Events (Episode: "Penultimate Peril: Part 1")	Barry Sonnenfeld	Netflix	
2019 (72nd)	Sesame Street's 50th Anniversary Special	Jack Jameson	HBO	

=== 2020s ===
Year	Program	Winners and nominees	Network	Ref.
2020 (73rd)	We Are the Dream: The Kids of the Oakland MLK Oratorical Fest	Amy Schatz	HBO	
2020 (73rd)	The Astronauts (Episode: "Countdown")	Dean Israelite	Nickelodeon	
2020 (73rd)	The Healing Powers of Dude (Episode: "Second Step: Homeroom")	Richie Keen	Netflix	
2020 (73rd)	High School Musical: The Musical: The Series (Episode: "Opening Night")	Kabir Akhtar	Disney+	
2020 (73rd)	On Pointe (Episode: "Showtime!")	Larissa Bills	Disney+	
2021 (74th)	Through Our Eyes (Episode: "Shelter")	Smriti Mundhra	HBO Max	
2021 (74th)	Are You Afraid of the Dark? (Episode: "The Tale of the Darkhouse")	Jeff Wadlow	Nickelodeon	
2021 (74th)	Head of the Class (Episode: "Three More Years")	Phill Lewis	HBO Max	
2021 (74th)	The J Team	Michael Lembeck	Paramount+	
2021 (74th)	The Mysterious Benedict Society (Episode: "A Bunch of Smart Orphans")	James Bobin	Disney+	
2022 (75th)	Best Foot Forward (Episode: "Halloween")	Anne Renton	Apple TV+	
2022 (75th)	Amber Brown (Episode: "I, Amber Brown")	Bonnie Hunt	Apple TV+	
2022 (75th)	Are You Afraid of the Dark? (Episode: "The Tale of Room 13")	Dean Israelite	Nickelodeon	
2022 (75th)	Better Nate Than Ever	Tim Federle	Disney+	
2022 (75th)	Snow Day	Michael Lembeck	Paramount+	
2023 (76th)	Stand Up & Shout: Songs from a Philly High School	Amy Schatz	HBO	
2023 (76th)	American Born Chinese (Episode: "A Monkey on a Quest")	Dinh Thai	Disney+	
2023 (76th)	American Born Chinese (Episode: "What Guy Are You")	Destin Daniel Cretton	Disney+	
2023 (76th)	Goosebumps (Episode: "Say Cheese and Die")	Rob Letterman	Disney+	
2023 (76th)	Percy Jackson and the Olympians (Episode: "I Accidentally Vaporize My Pre-Algebra Teacher")	James Bobin	Disney+	
2024 (77th)	Out of My Mind	Amber Sealey	Disney+	
2024 (77th)	Avatar: The Last Airbender (Episode: "Aang")	Michael Goi	Netflix	
2024 (77th)	Descendants: The Rise of Red	Jennifer Phang	Disney+	
2024 (77th)	The Spiderwick Chronicles (Episode: "Welcome to Spiderwick")	Kat Coiro	Roku Channel	
2024 (77th)	Sweet Tooth (Episode: "This Is a Story")	Jim Mickle	Netflix	

== Programs with multiple nominations ==
5 nominations

- The Wonderful World of Disney

4 nominations

- Even Stevens
- A Series of Unfortunate Events

3 nominations

- Are You Afraid of the Dark?

2 nominations

- American Born Chinese
- Bear in the Big Blue House
- Gortimer Gibbon's Life on Normal Street
- Goosebumps
- Lincoln Heights
- Saving My Tomorrow
- Sesame Street
- Sports Theater with Shaquille O'Neal

== Individuals with multiple awards ==
8 awards

- Amy Schatz

2 awards

- Paul Hoen
- Kenny Ortega

== Individuals with multiple nominations ==
13 nominations

- Amy Schatz

8 nominations

- Paul Hoen

4 nominations

- Michael Lembeck
- Sean McNamara

3 nominations

- Stuart Gillard
- Dean Israelite
- Jonathan Judge
- Kenny Ortega
- Fred Savage

2 nominations

- Greg Beeman
- James Bobin
- Kevin Hooks
- Jeffrey Hornaday
- Jack Jameson
- Mitchell Kriegman
- Stuart Margolin
- Joey Mazzarino
- Ron Oliver
- Brian Robbins
- Barry Sonnenfeld
- Andy Wolk

== Total awards by network ==
- HBO – 9
- Disney Channel – 8
- Nickelodeon – 3
- Showtime – 3
- ABC – 1
- Amazon – 1
- Apple TV+ – 1
- Disney+ – 1
- HBO Max – 1
- Netflix – 1
