= 29th Directors Guild of America Awards =

- Date: 1977
- Country: United States
- Presented by: Directors Guild of America

Highlights
- Best Director Feature Film: Rocky – John G. Avildsen
- Website: https://www.dga.org/Awards/History/1970s/1976.aspx?value=1976

The 29th Directors Guild of America Awards, honoring the outstanding directorial achievements in film and television in 1976, were presented in 1977.

== Winners and nominees ==
=== Film ===
Feature Film

John G. Avildsen – Rocky

- Sidney Lumet – Network
- Alan J. Pakula – All the President's Men
- Martin Scorsese – Taxi Driver
- Lina Wertmüller – Seven Beauties

=== Television ===
Drama Series

Glenn Jordan – Family for "Rites of Friendship"

- Bill Bixby – Rich Man, Poor Man Book II for "Chapter III"
- James Cellan Jones – The Adams Chronicles for "Chapter III: John Adams, Diplomat"
Comedy Series

Alan Alda – M*A*S*H for "Dear Sigmund"

- Hal Cooper – Maude for "Vivian's First Funeral"
- Jay Sandrich – Mary Tyler Moore for "Murray Can't Lose"
Musical Variety

Tony Charmoli – Shirley Maclaine: Gypsy in My Soul

- Dwight Hemion – The Dorothy Hamill Special
- David Powers – Sills and Burnett at the Met
Documentary/News

Arthur Bloom – Democratic and Republican National Convention (CBS News)

- Vernon Diamond – In Celebration of U.S. (CBS News)
- Marty Pasetta – 48th Academy Awards
Specials/Movies for TV/Actuality

Daniel Petrie – Eleanor and Franklin

- Thomas Gries – Helter Skelter
- Dwight Hemion – America Salutes Richard Rodgers: The Sound of His Music

=== Honorary Life Member ===
- H. C. Potter
