= 56th Directors Guild of America Awards =

- Date: February 7, 2004
- Location: Hyatt Regency Century Plaza, Los Angeles, California
- Country: United States
- Presented by: Directors Guild of America
- Hosted by: Carl Reiner

Highlights
- Best Director Feature Film: The Lord of the Rings: The Return of the King – Peter Jackson
- Best Director Documentary: My Architect – Nathaniel Kahn
- Website: https://www.dga.org/Awards/History/2000s/2003.aspx?value=2003

The 56th Directors Guild of America Awards, honoring the outstanding directorial achievements in films, documentary and television in 2003, were presented on February 7, 2004, at the Hyatt Regency Century Plaza. The ceremony was hosted by Carl Reiner. The nominees in the feature film category were announced on January 6, 2004 and the other nominations starting on January 8, 2004.

== Winners and nominees ==
=== Film ===
Feature Film

Peter Jackson – The Lord of the Rings: The Return of the King

- Sofia Coppola – Lost in Translation
- Clint Eastwood – Mystic River
- Gary Ross – Seabiscuit
- Peter Weir – Master and Commander: The Far Side of the World
Documentaries

Nathaniel Kahn – My Architect

- Sam Green and Bill Siegel – The Weather Underground
- Andrew Jarecki – Capturing the Friedmans
- Errol Morris – The Fog of War: Eleven Lessons from the Life of Robert S. McNamara
- José Padilha – Ônibus 174

=== Television ===
Drama Series

Christopher Misiano – The West Wing for "Twenty Five"

- Alan Ball – Six Feet Under for "I'm Sorry, I'm Lost"
- Kathy Bates – Six Feet Under for "Twilight"
- Jon Cassar – 24 for "Day 2: 7:00 a.m. – 8:00 a.m."
- Alan Poul – Six Feet Under for "Nobody Sleeps"
Comedy Series

Tim Van Patten – Sex and the City for "Boy, Interrupted"

- James Burrows – Will & Grace for "Last Ex to Brooklyn"
- Michael Engler – Sex and the City for "Hop, Skip, and a Week"
- Michael Patrick King – Sex and the City for "Great Sexpectations"
- James Widdoes – 8 Simple Rules for "Goodbye"
Miniseries or TV Film

Mike Nichols – Angels in America

- Jane Anderson – Normal
- Jeff Bleckner – The Music Man
- Rod Holcomb – The Pentagon Papers
- Richard Loncraine – My House in Umbria
Musical Variety

David Mallet – Cher: The Farewell Tour

- Marty Callner – Rolling Stones: Licks World Tour Live at Madison Square Garden
- Louis J. Horvitz – The 75th Annual Academy Awards
- Beth McCarthy-Miller – Saturday Night Live for "Host: Christopher Walken"
- Chuck O'Neil – The Daily Show with Jon Stewart
Daytime Serials

Larry Carpenter – One Life to Live for "Episode #8849"

- Andrew Lee and Jeff Rabin – Port Charles for "Episode #1561"
- Sally McDonald – The Young and the Restless for "Episode #7784"
- Susan Strickler – Guiding Light for "Episode #14279"
- Angela Tessinari – All My Children for "Episode #8722"
Children's Programs

Kevin Lima – The Wonderful World of Disney for "Eloise at Christmastime"

- Peter Gilbert – A Time for Dancing
- Kevin Hooks – The Wonderful World of Disney for "Sounder"
- Sean McNamara – The Even Stevens Movie
- Oz Scott – The Cheetah Girls

=== Commercials ===
Commercials

David Fincher – Nike's "Gamebreakers" and "Speed Chain", and Xelibri's "Beauty for Sale"

- Lance Acord – Adidas' "Wake Up Call", Nike's "Cross Country Spirit", and Mitsubishi's "Part Car, Part Religion"
- Errol Morris – Miller's "Pager" and "Alternative Fuel", Nike's "Bernard" and "Kathryn", and Cisco's "Meanwhile"
- Noam Murro – Got Milk?'s "Birthday", Saturn's "Beautiful", and Bud Light's "Mr. Way Too Much Cologne Wearer"
- Joe Pytka – Gatorade's "23 vs. 39", IBM's "Prodigy", and Nextel's "Shakespeare"

=== Lifetime Achievement in Feature Film ===
- Mike Nichols

=== Frank Capra Achievement Award ===
- Stephen Glanzrock

=== Robert B. Aldrich Service Award ===
- Jeremy Kagan

=== Franklin J. Schaffner Achievement Award ===
- Peery Forbis

=== Honorary Life Member ===
- Larry Auerbach
