= 58th Directors Guild of America Awards =

- Date: January 28, 2006
- Location: Hyatt Regency Century Plaza, Los Angeles, California
- Country: United States
- Presented by: Directors Guild of America
- Hosted by: Carl Reiner

Highlights
- Best Director Feature Film: Brokeback Mountain – Ang Lee
- Best Director Documentary: Grizzly Man – Werner Herzog
- Website: https://www.dga.org/Awards/History/2000s/2005.aspx?value=2005

The 58th Directors Guild of America Awards, honoring the outstanding directorial achievements in films, documentary and television in 2005, were presented on January 28, 2006, at the Hyatt Regency Century Plaza. The ceremony was hosted by Carl Reiner. The nominees in the feature film category were announced on January 5, 2006 and the other nominations were announced starting on January 9, 2006.

The award for Outstanding Directorial Achievement in Reality Programs was first introduced at this ceremony.

== Winners and nominees ==
=== Film ===
Feature Film

Ang Lee – Brokeback Mountain

- George Clooney – Good Night, and Good Luck.
- Paul Haggis – Crash
- Bennett Miller – Capote
- Steven Spielberg – Munich
Documentaries

Werner Herzog – Grizzly Man

- Kief Davidson and Richard Ladkani – The Devil's Miner
- Sean McAllister – The Liberace of Baghdad
- Rupert Murray – Unknown White Male
- Brent Renaud and Craig Renaud – Off to War: Welcome to Baghdad

=== Television ===
Drama Series

Michael Apted – Rome for "The Stolen Eagle"

- Alan Ball – Six Feet Under for "Everyone's Waiting"
- Paris Barclay – House for "Three Stories"
- Peter Horton – Grey's Anatomy for "A Hard Day's Night"
- Jeff Melman – Grey's Anatomy for "Into You Like a Train"
Comedy Series

Marc Buckland – My Name Is Earl for "Pilot"

- James Burrows – Will & Grace for "Alive and Schticking"
- Larry Charles – Curb Your Enthusiasm for "The End"
- Julian Farino – Entourage for "Exodus"
- Bryan Gordon – Curb Your Enthusiasm for "Korean Bookie"
Miniseries or TV Film

Joseph Sargent – Warm Springs (TIE)
George C. Wolfe – Lackawanna Blues (TIE)

- Darnell Martin – Oprah Winfrey Presents: Their Eyes Were Watching God
- James Steven Sadwith – Elvis
- Fred Schepisi – Empire Falls
Musical Variety

Matthew Diamond – Great Performances: Dance in America for "Swan Lake with American Ballet Theatre"

- Jerry Foley – Late Show with David Letterman for "Show #2452"
- Louis J. Horvitz – The 77th Annual Academy Awards
- Chuck O'Neil – The Daily Show with Jon Stewart
- Alan Skog – Live from Lincoln Center for "Higher Ground Hurricane Relief Benefit"
- Glenn Weiss – The 59th Annual Tony Awards
Daytime Serials

Owen Renfroe – General Hospital for "Episode #10914"

- Larry Carpenter – One Life to Live for "Episode #9385"
- Herbert Stein and Albert Alarr – Days of Our Lives for "Episode #10090"
- Michael Stich – The Bold and the Beautiful for "Episode #4623"
- Ellen Wheeler – Guiding Light for "Episode #14696"
Reality Programs

Tony Croll – Three Wishes for "Pilot" (TIE)
J. Rupert Thompson – Fear Factor for "Heist Fear Factor" (TIE)

- Ross Breitenbach – Brat Camp for "Episode #104"
- Starling Price – Penn & Teller: Bullshit! for "Circumcision"
- Bertram van Munster – The Amazing Race for "Episode #805"
Children's Programs

Chris Eyre – Edge of America

- Ellen Goosenberg Kent – I Have Tourette's but Tourette's Doesn't Have Me
- David Jackson – Buffalo Dreams
- D. J. MacHale – Flight 29 Down for "The Pits"
- Jessica Sharzer – Speak

=== Commercials ===
Commercials

Craig Gillespie – Ameriquest's "Surprise Dinner" and "Mini-Mart", and Altoids's "People of Pain" and "Fable of the Fruit Bat"

- Spike Jonze – Adidas' "Hello Tomorrow", Miller Beer's "Penguin", and Gap's "Pardon Our Dust"
- Rocky Morton – BellSouth's "Kung Fu Clowns" and "Dance Fight Plumbers", Cheese Nips' "Office", and CSI's "Take Me Home"
- Noam Murro – Hummer's "Monsters", Orange's "Black Out", and Nike's "Run Barefoot"
- Rupert Sanders – Adidas' "Made to Perfection" and Xbox's "Joy"

=== Lifetime Achievement in Feature Film ===
- Clint Eastwood

=== Lifetime Achievement in Sports Direction ===
- Joseph R. Aceti

=== Frank Capra Achievement Award ===
- Jerry H. Ziesmer

=== Franklin J. Schaffner Achievement Award ===
- Donald E. Jacob
