= 34th Directors Guild of America Awards =

- Date: March 13, 1982
- Location: The Beverly Hilton, Los Angeles, California; Plaza Hotel, New York City
- Country: United States
- Presented by: Directors Guild of America

Highlights
- Best Director Feature Film: Reds – Warren Beatty
- Website: https://www.dga.org/Awards/History/1980s/1981.aspx?value=1981

The 34th Directors Guild of America Awards, honoring the outstanding directorial achievements in film and television in 1981, were presented on March 13, 1982, at the Beverly Hilton and the Plaza Hotel. The television nominees were announced on February 9, 1982.

== Winners and nominees ==
=== Film ===
Feature Film

Warren Beatty – Reds

- Hugh Hudson – Chariots of Fire
- Louis Malle – Atlantic City
- Mark Rydell – On Golden Pond
- Steven Spielberg – Raiders of the Lost Ark

=== Television ===
Drama Series

Robert Butler – Hill Street Blues for "Hill Street Station"

- David Anspaugh – Hill Street Blues for "The Last White Man on East Ferry"
- Georg Stanford Brown – Hill Street Blues for "Up in Arms"
Comedy Series

Alan Alda – M*A*S*H for "The Life You Save"

- James Burrows – Taxi for "Jim the Psychic"
- Harry Morgan – M*A*S*H for "Blood Brothers"
Musical Variety

Emile Ardolino – Great Performances: Dance in America for "The Spellbound Child"

- Bill Davis and Tony Charmoli – Lily: Sold Out
- Clark Jones – Sinatra: The Man and His Music
Documentary

Robert Guenette – Great Movie Stunts: Raiders of the Lost Ark

- David Heeley – Starring Katharine Hepburn
- Harry Moses – The Mike Wallace Profiles for Jean Seberg
Actuality

Stan Harris – Command Performance at Ford's Theatre: The Stars Meet The President

- Clark Jones – 35th Tony Awards
- Doug Wilson – 1981 U.S. Figure Skating Championships
Specials/Movies for TV/Actuality

Herbert Wise – Skokie

- Emile Ardolino – Great Performances for "Nureyev and the Joffrey Ballet/In Tribute to Nijinsky"
- Anthony Harvey and Anthony Page – The Patricia Neal Story

=== Commercials ===
Commercials

Richard Levine – Pepsi's "First Love" and "Papa", and Kodak's "Summer Colt"

- R. Hagmann – The Church of Jesus Christ of Latter-day Saints' "Julie Through the Looking Glass", and Coca-Cola's "Railway Crossing"
- Tibor Hirsch – SOS's "Anniversary", Partager's "Camargue", United Airlines' "Clem's Story", and GTE's "Santa's Workshop"
- Joe Pytka – Henry Weinhard's' "Alaska", Bud Light's "Football", and Coca-Cola's "Thirsty Workers"
- Melvin Sokolsky – Fisher's "Beam" and Dr Pepper's "Roundy Room" and "Whistling"

=== D.W. Griffith Award ===
- Rouben Mamoulian

=== Frank Capra Achievement Award ===
- David Golden
- Wallace Worsley Jr.
