= 25th Directors Guild of America Awards =

- Date: 1973
- Country: United States
- Presented by: Directors Guild of America

Highlights
- Best Director Feature Film: The Godfather – Francis Ford Coppola
- Website: https://www.dga.org/Awards/History/1970s/1972.aspx?value=1972

The 25th Directors Guild of America Awards, honoring the outstanding directorial achievements in film and television in 1972, were presented in 1973.

== Winners and nominees ==
=== Film ===
Feature Film

Francis Ford Coppola – The Godfather

- John Boorman – Deliverance
- Bob Fosse – Cabaret
- George Roy Hill – Slaughterhouse-Five
- Martin Ritt – Sounder

=== Television ===
Drama Series

Robert Butler – The Waltons for "Dust Bowl Cousins"

- Marc Daniels – Marcus Welby, M.D. for "Love is When They Say They Need You"
- Charles S. Dubin – Hawaii Five-O for "V for Fashion"
Comedy Series

Gene Reynolds – M*A*S*H for "Pilot"

- Bill Hobin – Maude for "Maude's Dilemma"
- John Rich and Bob LaHendro – All in the Family for "The Bunkers and the Swingers"
Movies for Television and Mini-Series

Lamont Johnson – That Certain Summer

- Paul Bogart – The House Without a Christmas Tree
- Tom Gries – The Glass House
Musical Variety

Bob Fosse – Liza with a Z

- Bill Davis – The Julie Andrews Hour
- Arthur Fisher – The Sonny & Cher Comedy Hour
Documentary/News

Aram Boyajian – The American Indian: This Land Was His Land (ABC News special)

- Arthur Bloom – 60 Minutes
- Julian Krainin – Oceans: The Silent Crisis (ABC News special)

=== Outstanding Television Director ===
- Lamont Johnson

=== D.W. Griffith Award ===
- David Lean
- William A. Wellman

=== Honorary Life Member ===
- David Lean
