= 50th Directors Guild of America Awards =

- Date: March 7, 1998
- Location: Hyatt Regency Century Plaza, Los Angeles, California; Windows on the World, New York City
- Country: United States
- Presented by: Directors Guild of America

Highlights
- Best Director Feature Film: Titanic – James Cameron
- Best Director Documentary: Riding the Rails – Michael Uys and Lexy Lovell
- Website: https://www.dga.org/Awards/History/1990s/1997.aspx?value=1997

The 50th Directors Guild of America Awards, honoring the outstanding directorial achievements in films, documentary and television in 1997, were presented on March 7, 1998 at the Hyatt Regency Century Plaza and the Windows on the World. The nominees in the feature film category were announced on January 26, 1998 and the other nominations were announced starting on February 3, 1998.

== Winners and nominees ==
=== Film ===
Feature Film

James Cameron – Titanic

- James L. Brooks – As Good as It Gets
- Curtis Hanson – L.A. Confidential
- Steven Spielberg – Amistad
- Gus Van Sant – Good Will Hunting
Documentaries

Michael Uys and Lexy Lovell – Riding the Rails

- Ellen Hovde and Muffie Meyer – Liberty! The American Revolution for "Blows Must Decide"
- John O'Hagan – Wonderland
- Michèle Ohayon – Colors Straight Up
- Peter Rosen – First Person Singular: I.M. Pei

=== Television ===
Drama Series

Barbara Kopple – Homicide: Life on the Street for "The Documentary"

- Chris Carter – The X-Files for "The Post-Modern Prometheus"
- Christopher Chulack – ER for "Fathers and Sons"
- James Frawley – Ally McBeal for "Pilot"
- Mark Tinker – Brooklyn South for "Pilot"
Comedy Series

Andy Ackerman – Seinfeld for "The Betrayal"

- James Burrows – Dharma & Greg for "Pilot"
- Pamela Fryman – Frasier for "Halloween (Part I)"
- Gordon Hunt – Mad About You for "The Birth"
- Gil Junger – Ellen for "The Puppy Episode"
Miniseries or TV Film

John Herzfeld – Don King: Only in America

- John Frankenheimer – George Wallace
- William Friedkin – 12 Angry Men
- Charles Haid – Buffalo Soldiers
- Joseph Sargent – Miss Evers' Boys
Musical Variety

Louis J. Horvitz – 1997 Kennedy Center Honors

- Arthur Forrest – The Rosie O'Donnell Show
- Bruce Gowers – Fleetwood Mac Reunion Special
- Don Scardino – Tracey Takes On... for "Vegas"
- Thomas Schlamme – Tracey Takes On... for "1976"
Daytime Serials

Scott McKinsey – General Hospital for "Episode #8883"

- Susan Flannery – The Bold and the Beautiful for "Episode #2580"
- Christopher Goutman, Charles C. Dyer, and Maria Wagner – As the World Turns for "Episode #10446"
- Deveney Kelly – The Bold and the Beautiful for "Episode #2681"
- Frank Pacelli – The Young and the Restless for "Episode #6032"
Children's Programs

Brian Robbins – Nickelodeon's Sports Theater with Shaquille O'Neal for "First Time"

- Shawn Levy – The Secret World of Alex Mack for "Lies and Secrets"
- Melanie Mayron – The Wonderful World of Disney for "Toothless"
- Ron Oliver – Goosebumps for "The Perfect School"
- Howard Storm – Kenan and Kel for "Haven't Got Time for the Paint"

=== Commercials ===
Commercials

Bruce Dowad – Isuzu's "Giant", Mercedes-Benz' "Don't Fence Me In", and Coca-Cola's "World Dance"

- Robert Black – Lay's' "Antonio", Rite Aid's "Firefighter", and Southwestern Bell's "Rancher"
- Thom Higgins – Weyerhaeuser's "Love Note", Oreo's "Basketball", and Ford's "Generations"
- Erich Joiner – Smith & Wesson's "Bonus", "Yacht" and "Grandma"
- David Wild – Washington's Lottery's "Born to be Wild", Zima's "Sticky Shoes", and Saturn's "Doc Payne"

=== D.W. Griffith Award ===
- Francis Ford Coppola

=== Lifetime Achievement in Sports Direction ===
- Craig Janoff

=== Lifetime Achievement in News Direction ===
- Robert E. Vitarelli

=== Frank Capra Achievement Award ===
- Bob Jeffords

=== Robert B. Aldrich Service Award ===
- Martha Coolidge

=== Franklin J. Schaffner Achievement Award ===
- C.J. Rapp Pittman

=== Presidents Award ===
- George Sidney
