= Directors Guild of America Lifetime Achievement Award – Television =

Special award given to TV directors

The DGA Lifetime Achievement Award for Distinguished Achievement in Television Direction is an American television award presented by the Directors Guild of America (DGA) honoring career achievement in television direction. Created as a counterpart to the Lifetime Achievement Award for Distinguished Achievement in Motion Picture Direction, it was first awarded at the 67th Directors Guild of America Awards in 2015. Together with the motion picture lifetime achievement award, the award is considered one of the Directors Guild's two highest honors, and its recipients are determined by the present and past presidents of the DGA and a "blue-ribbon committee of prominent television directors".

== Recipients ==
Year	Recipient(s)	Ref.
2014	James Burrows and Robert Butler	
2015	Joe Pytka	
2016	No award	
2017	No award	
2018	Don Mischer	
2019	No award	
2020	No award	
2021	No award	
2022	Robert A. Fishman	
2023	David Nutter	
2024	No award	

== See also ==
- Directors Guild of America Lifetime Achievement Award – Feature Film
