= 60th Directors Guild of America Awards =

- Date: January 26, 2008
- Location: Hyatt Regency Century Plaza, Los Angeles, California
- Country: United States
- Presented by: Directors Guild of America
- Hosted by: Carl Reiner

Highlights
- Best Director Feature Film: No Country for Old Men – Ethan and Joel Coen
- Best Director Documentary: Ghosts of Cité Soleil – Asger Leth
- Website: https://www.dga.org/Awards/History/2000s/2007.aspx?value=2007

The 60th Directors Guild of America Awards, honoring the outstanding directorial achievements in films, documentary and television in 2007, were presented on January 26, 2008, at the Hyatt Regency Century Plaza. The ceremony was hosted by Carl Reiner. The nominees in the feature film category were announced on January 8, 2008, and the nominations for directorial achievement in television, documentaries and commercials were announced on January 10, 2008.

The awards were noted in the media for an incident in which actress Sean Young was ejected from the ceremony by security guards for heckling the stage and other behavior.

== Winners and nominees ==
=== Film ===
Feature Film

Ethan and Joel Coen – No Country for Old Men

- Paul Thomas Anderson – There Will Be Blood
- Tony Gilroy – Michael Clayton
- Sean Penn – Into the Wild
- Julian Schnabel – The Diving Bell and the Butterfly (Le scaphandre et le papillon)
Documentaries

Asger Leth – Ghosts of Cité Soleil

- Ken Burns and Lynn Novick – The War
- Alex Gibney – Taxi to the Dark Side
- Richard E. Robbins – Operation Homecoming: Writing the Wartime Experience
- Barbet Schroeder – Terror's Advocate

=== Television ===
Drama Series

Alan Taylor – Mad Men for "Smoke Gets in Your Eyes"

- Jack Bender – Lost for "Through the Looking Glass"
- David Chase – The Sopranos for "Made in America"
- Eric Laneuville – Lost for "The Brig"
- Tim Van Patten – The Sopranos for "Soprano Home Movies"
Comedy Series

Barry Sonnenfeld – Pushing Daisies for "Pie-lette"

- Michael Engler – 30 Rock for "Rosemary's Baby"
- David Grossman – Desperate Housewives for "Something's Coming"
- Beth McCarthy-Miller – 30 Rock for "Somebody to Love"
- David Nutter – Entourage for "The Resurrection"
Miniseries or TV Film

Yves Simoneau – Bury My Heart at Wounded Knee

- Jon Avnet – The Starter Wife
- Jeremiah Chechik – The Bronx Is Burning
- Lloyd Kramer – Oprah Winfrey Presents: Mitch Albom's For One More Day
- Mikael Salomon – The Company
Musical Variety

Glenn Weiss – The 61st Annual Tony Awards

- Jerry Foley – Late Show with David Letterman for "Show #2773"
- Louis J. Horvitz – The 79th Annual Academy Awards
- Jim Hoskinson – The Colbert Report for "Episode #3052"
- Chuck O'Neil – The Daily Show with Jon Stewart
Daytime Serials

Larry Carpenter – One Life to Live for "Episode #9947"

- Casey Childs – All My Children for "Episode #9669"
- Christopher Goutman – As the World Turns for "Episode #12971"
- Scott McKinsey – General Hospital for "Episode #11228"
- Ellen Wheeler – Guiding Light for "Episode #15221"
Reality Programs

Bertram van Munster – The Amazing Race for "Episode #1110"

- Craig Borders – Who Wants to Be a Superhero? for "Episode #208"
- Tony Croll – Shooting Sizemore for "Episode #101"
- Scott Messick – Pros vs. Joes for "Episode #201"
- Tony Sacco – Project Runway for "Fashion Giant #403"
Children's Programs

Paul Hoen – Jump In!

- Kenny Ortega – High School Musical 2
- Fred Savage – Wizards of Waverly Place for "The Crazy 10-Minute Sale"
- Judith Vogelsang – GoingGreen: Every Home an Eco-Home
- Andy Wolk – Lincoln Heights for "That Feeling We Have"

=== Commercials ===
Commercials

Nicolai Fuglsig – Guinness' "Tipping Point", J. C. Penney's "It's Magic", and Motorola's "Journey"

- Dante Ariola – PlayStation 3' "Grenade", Wrigley's "Flare", and Nike's "Addicted"
- Fredrik Bond – Got Milk?'s "Straw" and J. C. Penney's "Aviator"
- Frank Budgen – Bravia's "Playdoh" and Save Our Selves/Live Earth's "S.O.S."
- Noam Murro – Volkswagens's "Night Drive", Orbit's "Affair", and NBA's "Remember"

=== Frank Capra Achievement Award ===
- Liz Ryan

=== Franklin J. Schaffner Achievement Award ===
- Barbara J. Roche

=== Honorary Life Member ===
- Jay Roth
