= 30th Directors Guild of America Awards =

- Date: 1978
- Country: United States
- Presented by: Directors Guild of America

Highlights
- Best Director Feature Film: Annie Hall – Woody Allen
- Website: https://www.dga.org/Awards/History/1970s/1977.aspx?value=1977

The 30th Directors Guild of America Awards, honoring the outstanding directorial achievements in film and television in 1977, were presented in 1978.

== Winners and nominees ==
=== Film ===
Feature Film

Woody Allen – Annie Hall

- George Lucas – Star Wars
- Herbert Ross – The Turning Point
- Steven Spielberg – Close Encounters of the Third Kind
- Fred Zinnemann – Julia

=== Television ===
Drama Series

John Erman – Roots for "Part II"

- Joseph Hardy – James at 15 for "Friends"
- E. W. Swackhamer – Family for "Acts of Love: Part 1" and "Acts of Love: Part 2"
Comedy Series

Paul Bogart – All in the Family for "Edith's 50th Birthday"

- Alan Alda & Burt Metcalfe – M*A*S*H for "Comrades in Arms"
- Jay Sandrich – Soap for "Episode 7"
Musical Variety

Arthur Fisher – Neil Diamond: I'm Glad You're Here with Me Tonight

- Tony Charmoli – Mitzi Sings into Spring
- Bill Davis – Sinatra and Friends
Documentary

Perry Miller Adato – The Originals-Women in Art for Georgia O'Keeffe

- John Cosgrove – Jill Kinmont: From Tragedy to Triumph
- Jack Haley Jr. – Life Goes to War: Hollywood and the Home Front
Actuality

Raymond Lockhart – A Day with President Carter (NBC News special)

- Marvin Einhorn – The Today Show
- Marty Pasetta – 49th Academy Awards
Specials/Movies for TV/Actuality

Daniel Petrie – Eleanor and Franklin: The White House Years

- David Greene – Roots for "Part I"
- Gary Nelson – Washington: Behind Closed Doors

=== Honorary Life Member ===
- David Butler
