= 26th Directors Guild of America Awards =

- Date: March 16, 1974
- Location: The Beverly Hilton, Los Angeles, California
- Country: United States
- Presented by: Directors Guild of America

Highlights
- Best Director Feature Film: The Sting – George Roy Hill
- Website: https://www.dga.org/Awards/History/1970s/1973.aspx?value=1973

The 26th Directors Guild of America Awards, honoring the outstanding directorial achievements in film and television in 1973, were presented on March 16, 1974, at the Beverly Hilton.

== Winners and nominees ==
=== Film ===
Feature Film

George Roy Hill – The Sting

- Bernardo Bertolucci – Last Tango in Paris
- William Friedkin – The Exorcist
- George Lucas – American Graffiti
- Sidney Lumet – Serpico

=== Television ===
Drama Series

Charles S. Dubin – Kojak for "Knockover"

- Harry Harris – The Waltons for "The Journey"
- Jerry Thorpe – Kung Fu for "Eye for an Eye"
Comedy Series

Gene Reynolds – M*A*S*H for "Deal Me Out"

- Hal Cooper – Maude
- Jay Sandrich – Mary Tyler Moore for "Lou's First Date"
Movies for Television and Mini-Series

Joseph Sargent – The Marcus-Nelson Murders

- Robert Butler – The Blue Knight
- Anthony Harvey – The Glass Menagerie
Musical Variety

Dwight Hemion – Barbra Streisand...and Other Musical Instruments

- Arthur Fisher – The Sonny & Cher Comedy Hour
- Dave Powers – The Carol Burnett Show
Documentary/News

Arthur Bloom – 60 Minutes

- Dennis Azzarella – The Killer Instinct
- Alvin Mifelow – JFK: A Time to Remember

=== Outstanding Television Director ===
- Joseph Sargent

=== Honorary Life Member ===
- Charlie Chaplin
