= 5th Directors Guild of America Awards =

- Date: 1953
- Country: United States
- Presented by: Directors Guild of America

Highlights
- Best Director Feature Film: The Quiet Man – John Ford
- Website: https://www.dga.org/Awards/History/1950s/1952.aspx?value=1952

The 5th Directors Guild of America Awards, honoring the outstanding directorial achievements in film in 1952, were presented in 1953.

== Winners and nominees ==
=== Film ===
Feature Film

John Ford – The Quiet Man

- Charles Crichton – The Lavender Hill Mob
- George Cukor – Pat and Mike
- Michael Curtiz – I'll See You in My Dreams
- Cecil B. DeMille – The Greatest Show on Earth
- Hugo Fregonese – My Six Convicts
- Howard Hawks – The Big Sky
- Elia Kazan – Viva Zapata!
- Gene Kelly and Stanley Donen – Singin' in the Rain
- Henry King – The Snows of Kilimanjaro
- Akira Kurosawa – Rashomon
- Albert Lewin – Pandora and the Flying Dutchman
- Joseph L. Mankiewicz – 5 Fingers
- Vincente Minnelli – The Bad and the Beautiful
- George Sidney – Scaramouche
- Richard Thorpe – Ivanhoe
- Charles Vidor – Hans Christian Andersen
- Fred Zinnemann – High Noon

=== Special awards ===
D.W. Griffith Award

Cecil B. DeMille
