= 71st Directors Guild of America Awards =

- Date: February 2, 2019
- Location: Hollywood and Highland Center, Los Angeles, California
- Country: United States
- Presented by: Directors Guild of America
- Hosted by: Aisha Tyler

Highlights
- Best Director Feature Film: Roma – Alfonso Cuarón
- Best Director Documentary: Three Identical Strangers – Tim Wardle
- Best Director First-Time Feature Film: Eighth Grade – Bo Burnham
- Website: https://www.dga.org/Awards/Annual.aspx

The 71st Directors Guild of America Awards, honoring the outstanding directorial achievement in feature films, documentary, television and commercials of 2018, were presented on February 2, 2019, at the Hollywood and Highland Center, Los Angeles, California. The ceremony was hosted by Aisha Tyler. The nominations for the television and documentary categories were announced on January 7, 2019, while the nominations for the feature film categories were announced on January 8, 2019.

== Winners and nominees ==
=== Film ===
Feature Film

Alfonso Cuarón – Roma

- Bradley Cooper – A Star Is Born
- Peter Farrelly – Green Book
- Spike Lee – BlacKkKlansman
- Adam McKay – Vice
Documentaries

Tim Wardle – Three Identical Strangers

- Morgan Neville – Won't You Be My Neighbor?
- RaMell Ross – Hale County This Morning, This Evening
- Elizabeth Chai Vasarhelyi and Jimmy Chin – Free Solo
- Betsy West and Julie Cohen – RBG
First-Time Feature Film

Bo Burnham – Eighth Grade

- Bradley Cooper – A Star Is Born
- Carlos López Estrada – Blindspotting
- Matthew Heineman – A Private War
- Boots Riley – Sorry to Bother You

=== Television ===
Drama Series

Adam McKay – Succession for "Celebration"

- Jason Bateman – Ozark for "Reparations"
- Lesli Linka Glatter – Homeland for "Paean to the People"
- Chris Long – The Americans for "START"
- Daina Reid – The Handmaid's Tale for "Holly"
Comedy Series

Bill Hader – Barry for "Chapter One: Make Your Mark"

- Donald Glover – Atlanta for "FUBU"
- Hiro Murai – Atlanta for "Teddy Perkins"
- Daniel Palladino – The Marvelous Mrs. Maisel for "We're Going to the Catskills!"
- Amy Sherman-Palladino – The Marvelous Mrs. Maisel for "All Alone"
Movies for Television and Limited Series

Ben Stiller – Escape at Dannemora

- Cary Joji Fukunaga – Maniac
- David Leveaux and Alex Rudzinski – Jesus Christ Superstar Live in Concert
- Barry Levinson – Paterno
- Jean-Marc Vallée – Sharp Objects
Variety/Talk/News/Sports – Regularly Scheduled Programming

Don Roy King – Saturday Night Live for "Host Adam Driver/Musical Guest Kanye West"

- Paul G. Casey – Real Time with Bill Maher for "#1633"
- Sacha Baron Cohen, Nathan Fielder, Daniel Gray Longino, and Dan Mazer – Who Is America? for "Episode 102"
- Jim Hoskinson – The Late Show with Stephen Colbert for "#480"
- Paul Pennolino – Last Week Tonight with John Oliver for "Italian Election"
Variety/Talk/News/Sports – Specials

Louis J. Horvitz – The 60th Annual Grammy Awards

- Tim Mancinelli and Glenn Clements – The Late Late Show Carpool Karaoke Primetime Special 2018
- Beth McCarthy-Miller – Bill Maher: Live from Oklahoma
- Marcus Raboy – Steve Martin and Martin Short: An Evening You Will Forget for the Rest of Your Life
- Glenn Weiss – The 72nd Annual Tony Awards
Reality Programs

Russell Norman – The Final Table for "Japan"

- Neil P. DeGroot – Better Late Than Never for "How Do You Say Roots in German?"
- Eytan Keller – Iron Chef Gauntlet for "Episode 201"
- Patrick McManus – American Ninja Warrior for "Miami City Qualifiers"
- Bertram van Munster – The Amazing Race for "It's Just a Million Dollars, No Pressure"
Children's Programs

Jack Jameson – When You Wish Upon a Pickle: A Sesame Street Special

- Allan Arkush – A Series of Unfortunate Events for "The Hostile Hospital: Part 1"
- Greg Mottola – The Dangerous Book for Boys for "How to Walk on the Moon"
- Barry Sonnenfeld – A Series of Unfortunate Events for "The Vile Village: Part 1"
- Bo Welch – A Series of Unfortunate Events for "The Ersatz Elevator: Part 1"

=== Commercials ===
Commercials

Spike Jonze – Apple's "Welcome Home"

- Steve Ayson – Dollar Shave Club's "Getting Ready" and Speight's' "The Dance"
- Fredrik Bond – Virgin TV's "Harmony", BT Sport's "Take Them All On", and Confused.com's "The Big Win"
- Martin de Thurah – Audi's "Final Breath", Chase Bank's "Mama Said Knock You Out", and Macy's' "Space Station"
- David Shane – Babbel's "Alien" and Cure Alzheimer's Fund's "Mothers & Daughters"

=== Lifetime Achievement in Television ===
- Don Mischer

=== Frank Capra Achievement Award ===
- Kathleen McGill

=== Franklin J. Schaffner Achievement Award ===
- Mimi Deaton

=== Diversity Award ===
- FX Networks
