= Saving My Tomorrow =

- Genre: Documentary
- Country of origin: United States
- Original language: English
- No. of episodes: 6

Production
- Producers: Amy Schatz; Beth Aala
- Running time: 25 minutes
- Production company: HBO Documentary Films

Original release
- Network: HBO
- Release: December 15, 2014 – April 25, 2017

Saving My Tomorrow is a television series that covers environmentalist topics such as environmental destruction, climate change, and extinction. It features interviews and self-written songs from children, and features appearances from celebrities Tina Fey, Liam Neeson and Willie Nelson.

== Episodes ==
No.	Title	Original release date	US viewers (millions)
1	"Saving My Tomorrow Part 1"	December 15, 2014	N/A
2	"Saving My Tomorrow Part 2"	December 15, 2014	N/A
3	"Saving My Tomorrow Part 3"	April 22, 2015	N/A
4	"Saving My Tomorrow Part 4"	June 9, 2015	N/A
5	"Saving My Tomorrow Part 5"	February 25, 2016	N/A
6	"Saving My Tomorrow Part 6"	April 22, 2017	N/A
