= Bill Maher: Live from Oklahoma =

2018 stand-up comedy special by Bill Maher

- Genre: Stand-up comedy
- Written by: Bill Maher
- Directed by: Beth McCarthy-Miller
- Starring: Bill Maher
- Country of origin: United States
- Original language: English

Original release
- Network: HBO
- Release: 2018

Bill Maher: Live from Oklahoma (originally titled "Triggered") is American comedian, political satirist, and television personality Bill Maher's eleventh HBO stand-up comedy special.

The 66-minute special was recorded and broadcast live on HBO on July 7, 2018 from the Brady Theater in Tulsa, Oklahoma.

== Location ==
About the location of the special, Maher noted "I've never made a secret of my preference for performing in the red states. Don't get me wrong, America, I love all of ya, but I do enjoy going to places where I'm not expected to go better, and they seem to be more enthusiastic, possibly because they don't expect someone like me to show up there, or they don't see someone like me as much there, because they (liberals) are a minority. I feel like there's a certain extra sort of bonding that goes on between myself and the audience when I go to a place like Oklahoma.”

== Summary ==
The main focus of the special includes commentary on President Donald Trump and his political constituents, his whiny behavior and his controversial scandal with pornography actress Stormy Daniels. Maher also covers the Me Too movement, cannabis legalization, and the general state of the United States' political landscape in 2018. Maher notes the importance of liberals remaining focused and their frequent inability to delineate between the nuances of various social issues. The special also touches on topics including free speech, political correctness, immigration, religion, Maher's distaste for children, ageing, and sexuality.

Commenting on his own special, Maher notes that "the paradox of my life is, the more horrifying the country under Trump becomes, the more fun we have at my stand-up shows. I guess it's a release. Half of this show is about Trump, but I am determined to make half of it about me - my way of saying, 'Trump, you don't get to win!"

Bill Maher: Live from Oklahoma was directed by Beth McCarthy-Miller. It was produced by Maher and Miller, with help from Marc Gurvitz and Neal Marshall.

== Release ==
The special was released for digital download on streaming platforms on August 6, 2018. The special has not been given a release on either DVD or Blu-Ray.

== Reception ==
The special was not well received with many critics and fans alike. Critics complained that the content was mostly rehashes from his previous comedy specials and that much of it seemed unfocused. There are many direct segments and lines pulled from his past specials as well as material reworked from his current show Real Time with Bill Maher. It was also criticized for Maher's one-minded approach to many political issues that the special covered. Nicholas Martinez of LaughSpin noted that Maher's "unrelenting assault of the right wing and those Maher sees as the enemy can leave many who would naturally agree with his ideas in a defensive mode. Ultimately, Maher wants you to not only agree with him but to convert to his own cult of political personality."
