= 45th Directors Guild of America Awards =

- Date: March 6, 1993
- Location: The Beverly Hilton, Los Angeles, California; New York City
- Country: United States
- Presented by: Directors Guild of America
- Hosted by: Carl Reiner (Los Angeles); Jerry Orbach (New York)

Highlights
- Best Director Feature Film: Unforgiven – Clint Eastwood
- Best Director Documentary: Brother's Keeper – Joe Berlinger and Bruce Sinofsky
- Website: https://www.dga.org/Awards/History/1990s/1992.aspx?value=1992

The 45th Directors Guild of America Awards, honoring the outstanding directorial achievements in films, documentary and television in 1992, were presented on March 6, 1993 at the Beverly Hilton and in New York. The ceremony in Beverly Hills was hosted by Carl Reiner and the ceremony in New York was hosted by Jerry Orbach. The feature film nominees were announced on January 25, 1993 and the other nominations were announced starting on February 22, 1993. Prior to the nominations announcement, finalists were announced for the television categories.

== Winners and nominees ==
=== Film ===
Feature Film

Clint Eastwood – Unforgiven

- Robert Altman – The Player
- James Ivory – Howards End
- Neil Jordan – The Crying Game
- Rob Reiner – A Few Good Men
Documentaries

Joe Berlinger and Bruce Sinofsky – Brother's Keeper

- Ric Burns – The Donner Party
- Mark Stouffer – Braving Alaska

=== Television ===
Drama Series

Rob Thompson – Northern Exposure for "Cicely"

- Roy Campanella II – I'll Fly Away for "The Way Things Are"
- Michael Fresco – Northern Exposure for "Thanksgiving"
Comedy Series

Tom Cherones – Seinfeld for "The Contest"

- Jason Alexander – Seinfeld for "The Good Samaritan"
- James Burrows – Cheers for "An Old-Fashioned Wedding"
Miniseries or TV Film

Ron Lagomarsino – Picket Fences for "Pilot"

- Frank Pierson – Citizen Cohn
- Joseph Sargent – Miss Rose White
Musical Variety

Bobby Quinn – The Tonight Show Starring Johnny Carson for "Robin Williams/Bette Midler"

- Hal Gurnee – Late Night with David Letterman for "10th Anniversary Special"
- Jeff Margolis – The 64th Annual Academy Awards
Daytime Serials

Susan Strickler – Another World for "Episode #7022"

- Kenneth Herman Jr. – Days of Our Lives for "Episode #6888"
- Frank Pacelli – The Young and the Restless for "Episode #4825"
Daytime Drama

Helaine Head – WonderWorks for "You Must Remember This"

- Neema Barnette – CBS Schoolbreak Special for "Different Worlds: A Story of Interracial Love"
- Strath Hamilton – CBS Schoolbreak Special for "Please, God, I'm Only Seventeen"

=== Commercials ===
Commercials

Leslie Dektor – American Express' "Elevator", US West's "Missed the Bus", Bank of America's "Second Generation", and Southern California Edison's "Truth"

- William Patterson – Philips' "DCC Clear Sound"
- Joe Pytka – Nike's "Hare Jordan" and Hallmark Cards' "Old Friend"

=== D.W. Griffith Award ===
- Sidney Lumet

=== Lifetime Achievement in Sports Direction ===
- Harry Coyle

=== Frank Capra Achievement Award ===
- Willard H. Sheldon

=== Robert B. Aldrich Service Award ===
- Gene Reynolds
- John Rich

=== Franklin J. Schaffner Achievement Award ===
- James Woodworth

=== Honorary Life Member ===
- Arthur Hiller
