= 41st Directors Guild of America Awards =

- Date: March 11, 1989
- Location: The Beverly Hilton, Los Angeles, California; Plaza Hotel, New York City
- Country: United States
- Presented by: Directors Guild of America

Highlights
- Best Director Feature Film: Rain Man – Barry Levinson
- Website: https://www.dga.org/Awards/History/1980s/1988.aspx?value=1988

The 41st Directors Guild of America Awards, honoring the outstanding directorial achievements in film and television in 1988, were presented on March 11, 1989, at the Beverly Hilton and the Plaza Hotel. The feature film nominees were announced on January 31, 1989.

== Winners and nominees ==
=== Film ===
Feature Film

Barry Levinson – Rain Man

- Charles Crichton – A Fish Called Wanda
- Mike Nichols – Working Girl
- Alan Parker – Mississippi Burning
- Robert Zemeckis – Who Framed Roger Rabbit

=== Television ===
Drama Series

Marshall Herskovitz – thirtysomething for "Therapy"

- Mark Tinker – St. Elsewhere for "The Last One"
- Edward Zwick – thirtysomething for "Accounts Receivable, Michael's Brother"
Comedy Series

Steve Miner – The Wonder Years for "Pilot"

- Ellen Gittelsohn – Roseanne for "Pilot"
- Barnet Kellman – Murphy Brown for "Pilot"
Miniseries or TV Film

Lamont Johnson – Lincoln

- Dan Curtis – War and Remembrance
- Rod Holcomb – China Beach for "Pilot"
Musical Variety

Walter C. Miller – Irving Berlin's 100th Birthday Celebration

- David Grossman – The Smothers Brothers Comedy Hour: The 20th Reunion
- Hal Gurnee – Late Night with David Letterman for "6th Anniversary Special"
Daytime Drama

Jesus Trevino – CBS Schoolbreak Special for "Gangs"

- Kevin Hooks – CBS Schoolbreak Special for "Home Sweet Homeless"
- Gilbert Moses – ABC Afterschool Specialfor "Daddy Can't Read"
Documentary/Actuality

Merrill Brockway – Great Performances for "On the Move"

- Ellen Hovde and Muffie Meyer – An Empire of Reason
- Lloyd Kramer – No One Dies Alone
Sports

Harry J. Coyle – 1988 World Series

- Robert Fishman – 1988 NCAA Basketball Championship for "Oklahoma vs. Kansas"
- Larry Kamm – Super Bowl XXII
- Don Ohlmeyer and Roger Goodman – 1988 Indianapolis 500

=== Commercials ===
Commercials

James Gartner – The Church of Jesus Christ of Latter-day Saints' "Braces & Glasses", Major League Baseball's "Interesting Friends", and Church World Service's "Journal"

- David Ashwell – Crossland Federal Savings Bank's "Detective", Gallo's "Dinner for Six", Kellogg's' "Hard Days Work", and Pepsi's "Thumbs Up"
- Leslie Dektor – Security Pacific Bank's "Football", Schlage's "School", and Levi's' "Yo Yo Do-Wop"
- Richard Levine – Delta Air Lines' "Company B", Hyundai's "Escape", and Seagram's "Kzev" and "Relationships"
- Robert Lieberman – AT&T's "Celebration", and McDonald's' "County Champ" and "Olympic Hopefuls"

=== Robert B. Aldrich Service Award ===
- Gilbert Cates

=== Honorary Life Member ===
- Sidney Lumet
