= 54th Directors Guild of America Awards =

- Date: March 9, 2002
- Location: Hyatt Regency Century Plaza, Los Angeles, California
- Country: United States
- Presented by: Directors Guild of America
- Hosted by: Carl Reiner

Highlights
- Best Director Feature Film: A Beautiful Mind – Ron Howard
- Best Director Documentary: Startup.com – Chris Hegedus and Jehane Noujaim
- Website: https://www.dga.org/Awards/History/2000s/2001.aspx?value=2001

The 54th Directors Guild of America Awards, honoring the outstanding directorial achievements in films, documentary and television in 2001, were presented on March 9, 2002, at the Hyatt Regency Century Plaza. The ceremony was hosted by Carl Reiner. The nominees in the feature film category were announced on January 22, 2002 and the other nominations were announced starting on February 1, 2002.

== Winners and nominees ==
=== Film ===
Feature Film

Ron Howard – A Beautiful Mind

- Peter Jackson – The Lord of the Rings: The Fellowship of the Ring
- Baz Luhrmann – Moulin Rouge!
- Christopher Nolan – Memento
- Ridley Scott – Black Hawk Down
Documentaries

Chris Hegedus and Jehane Noujaim – Startup.com

- Charles Braverman – Rocky and Rolanda
- Stephen Ives – Amato: A Love Affair with Opera
- Frances Reid and Deborah Hoffmann – Long Night's Journey Into Day
- Martin J. Spinelli – Life on Jupiter: The Story of Jens Nygaard, Musician

=== Television ===
Drama Series

Alan Ball – Six Feet Under for "Pilot"

- Paris Barclay – The West Wing for "The Indians in the Lobby"
- Steve Buscemi – The Sopranos for "Pine Barrens"
- Stephen Hopkins – 24 for "12:00 a.m. – 1:00 a.m."
- Thomas Schlamme – The West Wing for "Two Cathedrals"
Comedy Series

Todd Holland – Malcolm in the Middle for "Bowling"

- James Burrows – Will & Grace for "Bed, Bath, and Beyond"
- Allen Coulter – Sex and the City for "Defining Moments"
- Michael Engler – Sex and the City for "My Motherboard, Myself"
- Michael Patrick King – Sex and the City for "The Real Me"
Miniseries or TV Film

Frank Pierson – Conspiracy

- Robert Allan Ackerman – Life with Judy Garland: Me and My Shadows
- Jon Avnet – Uprising
- Billy Crystal – 61*
- Mark Rydell – James Dean
Musical Variety

Joel Gallen and Beth McCarthy-Miller – America: A Tribute to Heroes

- Jerry Foley – Late Show with David Letterman for "Episode #1634"
- Louis J. Horvitz – 2001 Kennedy Center Honors
- Barbra Streisand and Don Mischer – Barbra Streisand: Timeless
- Glenn Weiss – The 55th Annual Tony Awards
Daytime Serials

William Ludel – General Hospital for "Episode #9801"

- Randy Robbins – Days of Our Lives for "Episode #8991"
- Michael Stich – The Bold and the Beautiful for "Episode #3532"
- Angela Tessinari – All My Children for "Episode #8186"
- Gary Tomlin – One Life to Live for "Episode #8437"
Children's Programs

Amy Schatz – 'Twas the Night: A Holiday Celebration

- Adam Arkin – My Louisiana Sky
- Sean McNamara – Even Stevens for "Very Scary Story"
- Robert Munic – They Call Me Sirr
- Dan Petrie – Walter and Henry

=== Commercials ===
Commercials

Bob Kerstetter – Musco Family Olive's "Worker", "Orphanage", and "Birds"

- Adam Cameron and Simon Cole – Dr Pepper/Seven Up's "Calendar", "Captive Audience" and "Singers", Cingular Wireless's "Touchdown Dance School", Visa's "Baby Talk", and Toyota's "Subtitles"
- Craig Gillespie – Holiday Inn Express' "Kiss Reunion", Citibank's "Delivery Room" and "College Tuition", Ameritech's "Plumber", and SBC's "Welcome Wagon"
- Joe Pytka – NYC Miracle's "The Deli" and "Skating", Disney's "Pillow Talk", and Ad Council's "Ketchup Soup"
- Baker Smith – Lucky Magazine's "Cheryl 'N Me", Fox Sports' "Nail Gun", Toshiba's "Asylum", and Heineken's "Birth of Scratching"

=== Frank Capra Achievement Award ===
- Burton Bluestein

=== Robert B. Aldrich Service Award ===
- Edwin Sherin

=== Franklin J. Schaffner Achievement Award ===
- Anita Cooper-Avrick

=== Honorary Life Member ===
- Delbert Mann
