= Wallace Worsley Jr. =

American film director

- Born: 27 June 1908; Fort Wayne, Indiana, US
- Died: 18 June 1991 (aged 82); Los Angeles County, California, US
- Burial place: Forest Lawn Memorial Park, Glendale
- Occupations: Assistant director, production manager
- Years active: 1936–1986
- Spouse: Sue Dwiggins

Wallace Worsley Jr. (June 27, 1908 – June 18, 1991) was an American production manager and assistant director. The son of stage actor and film director Wallace Worsley, he worked on dozens of films between 1939 and 1986. In 1982, he was awarded the Frank Capra Achievement Award.
