= 43rd Directors Guild of America Awards =

- Date: March 16, 1991
- Location: The Beverly Hilton, Los Angeles, California; Crowne Plaza, New York City
- Country: United States
- Presented by: Directors Guild of America
- Hosted by: Alan Alda (Los Angeles); Paul Sorvino (New York)

Highlights
- Best Director Feature Film: Dances with Wolves – Kevin Costner
- Website: https://www.dga.org/Awards/History/1990s/1990.aspx?value=1990

The 43rd Directors Guild of America Awards, honoring the outstanding directorial achievements in film and television in 1990, were presented on March 16, 1991, at the Beverly Hilton and the Crowne Plaza New York. The ceremony in Beverly Hills was hosted by Alan Alda and the ceremony in New York was hosted by Paul Sorvino. The feature film nominees were announced on January 30, 1991 and nominees in eight television categories were announced on February 4, 1991.

== Winners and nominees ==
=== Film ===
Feature Film

Kevin Costner – Dances with Wolves

- Francis Ford Coppola – The Godfather Part III
- Barry Levinson – Avalon
- Martin Scorsese – Goodfellas
- Giuseppe Tornatore – Cinema Paradiso

=== Television ===
Drama Series

Michael Zinberg – Quantum Leap for "The Leap Home (Part 2)"

- Lesli Linka Glatter – Twin Peaks for "Episode 5"
- Scott Winant – thirtysomething for "The Go-Between"
Comedy Series

James Burrows – Cheers for "Woody Interruptus"

- Peter Baldwin – The Wonder Years for "The Ties That Bind"
- Barnet Kellman – Murphy Brown for "Bob & Murphy & Ted & Avery"
Miniseries or TV Film

Roger Young – Murder in Mississippi

- Gilbert Cates – Call Me Anna
- Peter Werner – Hiroshima: Out of the Ashes
Musical Variety

Jeff Margolis – The 62nd Annual Academy Awards

- Hal Gurnee – Late Night with David Letterman for "8th Anniversary Special"
- Paul Miller – In Living Color for "Pilot"
Daytime Drama

Lynn Hamrick – ABC Afterschool Special for "Testing Dirty"

- Joanna Lee – CBS Schoolbreak Special for "The Fourth Man"
- Mario Van Peebles – CBS Schoolbreak Special for "Malcolm Takes a Shot"
Documentary/Actuality

Elena Mannes – Amazing Grace

- Vincent DeVito – Let Me Be Brave
- Susan Steinberg – American Masters for "Edward R. Murrow: This Reporter (Part 1)"
Sports

Robert Fishman – 1990 American League Championship Series for "Game 4"

- William Webb – 1990 Kentucky Derby
- Doug Wilson – Wide World of Sports for "Brian Boitano & Katerina Witt Skating"

=== Commercials ===
Commercials

Peter Smillie – Jeep Wrangler's "Driving Lesson", United Parcel Service's "Ian Alistair Mackenzie", National Council on Alcoholism's "Little Girl",
and FMC Corporation's "Perfectionist"

- Leslie Dektor – Mercedes-Benz' "Interview", Saturn's "Launch", and Bell Atlantic's "Sundays"
- James Gartner – Pizza Hut's "Driveway" and "The Big Moment", and AT&T's "Why Not"
- Michael Grasso – Hallmark Cards' "100th Birthday" and Centers for Disease Control and Prevention's "HIV Positive"
- Joe Pytka – Nike's "Bo & Bo", FedEx' "New Technology", and Diet Pepsi's "Opera"

=== Frank Capra Achievement Award ===
- Howard W. Koch

=== Preston Sturgess Award ===
- Billy Wilder

=== Robert B. Aldrich Service Award ===
- Larry Auerbach
- Milt Felsen

=== Franklin J. Schaffner Achievement Award ===
- Chester O'Brien
- Mortimer O'Brien

=== Honorary Life Member ===
- Gilbert Cates
