= Larry Auerbach =

American television director

- Born: February 10, 1923; Bronx, New York, US
- Died: December 20, 2014 (aged 91); La Jolla, California, US
- Education: Northwestern University
- Occupation: Television director
- Spouse: Gale Auerbach
- Children: 1

Larry Auerbach (February 10, 1923 – December 20, 2014) was an American television director. He was born in The Bronx, New York.

Auerbach's career as a director coincided with the early years of television and the organization of the fledgling medium's directors during the first years after the Second World War.

A director for half a century, he was a member of the Directors Guild of America and one of its predecessors, the Radio and Television Directors Guild, which merged with the Screen Directors Guild in 1960 to form today's Directors Guild. He was a National Vice President of the Directors Guild and a member of its National Board.

== Directing for television ==
After a brief career in radio and later as a television stage manager for pioneering shows including Studs' Place with Studs Terkel and Kukla, Fran & Ollie, Auerbach became the first director of Mr. Wizard in 1951, following a brief stint on Zoo Parade, a live program from the Lincoln Park Zoo with Marlin Perkins that predated the long-running Wild Kingdom.

=== Directing for soap operas ===
In September 1951, Auerbach was hired to be the first director of the soap opera Love of Life on the CBS network. With Auerbach as the principal director, Love of Life was part of the early careers of actors Frances Sternhagen, Paul Michael Glaser, Christopher Reeve, Roy Scheider, Bonnie Bedelia, Jessica Walter, Nancy Marchand, Ray Wise, Tony Lo Bianco, Jonathan Frakes, Warren Beatty and Peter Falk.

Love of Life ran for 28 years, with Auerbach at the helm for most of the episodes and still directing when the show ended in 1980 (at the time, it was the second-longest running show on television). The series concluded with Auerbach walking from empty set to empty set, turning off the lights, accompanied by Tony Bennett's song, "We'll Be Together Again".

From there, Auerbach went on to direct several other New York-based soap operas, including All My Children, One Life to Live, Another World and As the World Turns. By the time of his retirement from directing in the 1990s, Auerbach had reached iconic status in New York daytime drama circles, with a career that spanned five decades. He was among those interviewed by Dustin Hoffman for the comedy set on a soap opera studio, Tootsie. Given the never-ending production cycle of soap operas (without rerun seasons) and the massive number of minutes produced each week (many soap operas are now daily one-hour shows, as opposed to the early 15-, 30-, or 45-minute episodes), It seems likely that Auerbach has directed more dramatic (i.e., non-news) television than any other American director (approximately 3,000 hours).

== Awards and recognition ==
Auerbach received the Directors Guild of America's Robert B. Aldrich Award in 1991, and was named an Honorary Life Member of the Directors Guild in 2004, joining a small, elite group that includes Charles Chaplin, David Lean, Frank Capra, Walt Disney, Darryl F. Zanuck, Louis B. Mayer, Jack L. Warner, Lew Wasserman, Elia Kazan, Chuck Jones, Joseph L. Mankiewicz and Jack Valenti.

He also received a Daytime Emmy Award for Outstanding Directing in 1984 for his work on ABC's One Life to Live.

His recollections and advice on directing soaps are featured in the books The Box: An Oral History of Television 1920–1961 by Jeff Kisseloff, Take One: Television Directors on Directing by Jack Kuney and Directing for Television: Conversations with American TV Directors by Brian G. Rose. His work on All My Children is featured in an episode of the 1982 PBS series Media Probes. A collection of kinescopes of his early work on Love of Life is archived at The Paley Center for Media in New York.

== Death ==
Complications from brain cancer led to Auerbach's death in La Jolla, California, at age 91.
