= The Liberace of Baghdad =

2005 British documentary film

- Directed by: Sean McAllister
- Produced by: Nick Fraser; Mette Heide; Mette Hoffman Meyer; Mette Hoffman Meyer; Sean McAllister
- Starring: Samir Peter; Sean McAllister
- Cinematography: Sean McAllister
- Edited by: Oliver Huddleston
- Music by: Samir Peter
- Distributed by: BBC
- Release date: 2005
- Running time: 74 minutes
- Country: United Kingdom
- Languages: English; Arabic

The Liberace of Baghdad is a 2005 British documentary film by filmmaker Sean McAllister focusing on the life and music of Iraqi pianist Samir Peter and his family in wartime Baghdad. The film received a 2005 Sundance Film Festival Special Jury award as well as the 2005 British Independent Film Award for Best British Documentary. Samir Peter previously appeared in the 2004 documentary Voices of Iraq.

== See also ==
- Voices of Iraq
