= Merrill Brockway =

- Born: Merrill La Monte Brockway; February 28, 1923; New Carlisle, Indiana, US
- Died: May 2, 2013 (aged 90); Santa Fe, New Mexico, US
- Education: Columbia University (BA, MA)
- Occupation(s): Television producer, director
- Known for: Producing and directing Camera Three and Dance in America
- Awards: Emmy Award (1979, 1984); Directors Guild of America Award (1978, 1988)

Merrill La Monte Brockway (February 28, 1923 – May 2, 2013) was an American television producer known for producing the PBS television series Dance in America.

== Biography ==
Brockway was born on February 28, 1923, in New Carlisle, Indiana. He began playing piano at age seven, and served in the United States Army in Europe during World War II, when he drove for a chaplain and played music for the chaplain's services. After the war, he received his bachelor's and master's degrees from Columbia University. He became interested in dance after a Columbia classmate took him to see Martha Graham. Having graduated from Columbia, he worked as an accompanist for singers, including the soprano Patricia Neway.

In 1953, Brockway joined WCAU and his first job was moving scenery for Action in the Afternoon. Within a year, he was then promoted to director and worked on educational and children's programs for CBS affiliates in Philadelphia and New York City. From 1967 to 1975, he directed and produced Camera Three, a half-hour program devoted to culture aired Sunday mornings on CBS. As producer, he worked with notable artists such as Stella Adler, Eugene Ormandy, Ruby Dee and Merce Cunningham.

He then joined PBS and directed and produced Dance in America, a sub-series of Great Performances, until 1980, when he returned to CBS as executive producer of arts programming for the newly formed CBS Cable cultural channel, which was discontinued two years later. As producer of Dance in America, he introduced the public to famous dancers such as George Balanchine, Martha Graham, Merce Cunningham, Agnes de Mille, Jerome Robbins, and Twyla Tharp. He directed American Masters installments on Stella Adler and Tennessee Williams.

Brockway received two primetime Emmy Awards for his work on Dance in America, in 1979 and 1984. He also won two awards for directorial achievement from the Directors Guild of America.

In the 1990s, Brockway produced independent TV projects as well as the 1993 film version of George Balanchine's The Nutcracker. He retired to Santa Fe, New Mexico, in 1993.

Brockway died on May 2, 2013, in Santa Fe. His archives are stored at National Dance Institute New Mexico.
