= Dwight Hemion =

American television director (1926–2008)

- Born: Dwight Arlington Hemion Jr. March 14, 1926; New Haven, Connecticut, U.S.
- Died: January 28, 2008 (aged 81); Rectortown, Virginia, U.S.
- Occupation: Television director
- Spouses: Joyce Hogue (m. 1953; div. 1970); Katherine Morrissy (m. 1973)
- Children: 2

Dwight Arlington Hemion Jr. (March 14, 1926 – January 28, 2008) was an American television director known mainly for music-themed television programs of the 1960s and 1970s. He held the record for the most Emmy nominations (47), and won 18 times, putting him at the top of his profession throughout the 1960s, 1970s, and well into the 1980s. He also won the Directors Guild of America's top TV award five times, six Ace awards and a Peabody award.

== Career ==
Hemion began working in live television in New York City in the 1950s, particularly for the original Tonight Show starring Steve Allen. In the 1960s, Hemion began concentrating on musical-variety shows, working with producer Gary Smith on a popular series of Kraft Music Hall specials for NBC-TV. Smith-Hemion Productions arguably defined the fast-paced look and glamorous style of the American comedy-variety genre, and influenced scores of later generations working in television.

Hemion had a knack for balancing both visual and musical elements that made him a master of directing concert performance specials. He worked with such major stars as Andy Williams, Frank Sinatra, Bing Crosby, Barbra Streisand, Sammy Davis Jr., Paul McCartney, Bette Midler, Shirley MacLaine, Julie Andrews, Elvis Presley, Burt Bacharach, The Muppets, and Luciano Pavarotti. He also won Emmys for directing the Kennedy Center Honors in 1989 and 1990.

== Productions ==
Among the most memorable specials that Hemion produced and directed were: My Name Is Barbra (1965), Frank Sinatra: A Man and His Music (1965), Peter Pan (a 1976 version with a new score, not to be confused with the musical starring Mary Martin), Baryshnikov on Broadway (1980), and Barbra Streisand: The Concert (1994). Along with producing partner Gary Smith, Hemion later branched out into producing large conventions, including the nomination conventions for the Democratic Party as well as the inaugural ceremonies for Ronald Reagan and Bill Clinton. He is also credited as an executive producer for The Star Wars Holiday Special along with Smith.

== Death ==
Hemion died of kidney failure in Rectortown, Virginia, at the age of 81.
