= Tony Charmoli =

American actor and director (1921–2020)

Tony Charmoli (June 11, 1922 – August 7, 2020) was an American dancer, choreographer, and director. He began dancing on Broadway in such shows as Make Mine Manhattan but soon began choreographing for television with Stop the Music in 1949. Charmoli then choreographed dance sequences for the popular Your Hit Parade, winning his first Emmy Award in 1956. He went on to direct and choreograph for some of the biggest stars including Dinah Shore, Lily Tomlin, Danny Kaye, Julie Andrews, Cyd Charisse, Shirley MacLaine, Mitzi Gaynor, Lucille Ball, and others. On Broadway, Tony choreographed Ankles Aweigh (1955) and Woman of the Year (1981) with Lauren Bacall. Over his career, he was nominated for fifteen Emmy awards and won three.

== Early life ==
Charmoli was born in 1921 in Mountain Iron, Minnesota as the youngest of nine siblings. His parents had immigrated from Italy. When he was 16 years old, he traveled alone by bus to Jacob's Pillow in Becket, Massachusetts in order to intern as a dancer for the summer. The next year, on Valentine's Day, he met Wilford Saunders, who was to become his life partner and business manager.

Charmoli and Saunders each enlisted in the military during World War II. Charmoli was an operations officer in the 43rd Fighter Squadron in the U.S. Air Force in Panama and organized entertainment shows for them, while Saunders was sent to Europe and became a secretary to Gen. Dwight D. Eisenhower.

== Career ==
In 1947, he performed on Broadway for the first time, in the production Dear Judas. He also choreographed Eddie Fisher at the Winter Garden in 1962, as well as Shirley MacLaine's Broadway revue in 1976. In 1948, Charmoli danced in Make Mine Manhattan, but gave the part to Bob Fosse when the show toured nationally. Charmoli found Fosse work as a dancer on the TV shows he was working on when Fosse returned from the tour.

Charmoli worked in 1949 as choreographer on ABC television's Stop the Music. He then joined NBC-TV's Your Hit Parade in 1950, and in 1956 won his first Emmy, for his work on the show. He subsequently moved to Los Angeles to take a position on Dinah Shore's television variety program.

Charmoli continued working as a television director. He directed the 1977 CBS television adaptation of The Nutcracker, starring Mikhail Baryshnikov and Gelsey Kirkland. He directed and choreographed nearly all of Mitzi Gaynor's television specials in the 1970s as well as two of Shirley MacLaine's. He also worked many times with Sid and Marty Krofft, directing all seventeen episodes of Lidsville and The Bugaloos, respectively, as well as their TV special Fol-de-Rol. He directed the first two years of Star Search (1984–85), and several years of Circus of the Stars, as well as John Denver and the Muppets: A Christmas Together (1979), winning the Directors Guild Award.

Charmoli also directed several Bob Hope specials, more than twenty televised beauty pageants, and the short-lived summer replacement series The Keane Brothers Show (1977).

He was the recipient of three Emmy Awards, plus twelve other Emmy nominations. His second win was in 1974 for "Mitzi ... A Tribute to the American Housewife" starring Mitzi Gaynor; the final one was for Shirley McLaine's 1976 show "Gypsy In My Soul" (for which he also won the Directors Guild of America award).

Other performers he collaborated with included Beyoncé, LeAnn Rimes, and Justin Timberlake.

In 2016, he teamed with Paul Manchester to compose his biography called Stars in My Eyes.

Charmoli died in August 2020 at his home in the Hollywood Hills at the age of 98. His partner Saunders died in 1999.

Charmoli is considered one of the top television choreographers in history. He felt the television cameras needed to be just as involved with choreography as the dancers, so he always took time to block those as well.
