= Louis J. Horvitz =

American television director

- Born: Los Angeles, California, U.S.
- Occupation: Television director
- Relatives: Richard Steven Horvitz (brother)

Louis J. Horvitz is an American television director and producer.

He was the director of the telecasts of the 69th Academy Awards, 70th Academy Awards, 71st Academy Awards, 72nd Academy Awards, 73rd Academy Awards, 74th Academy Awards, 75th Academy Awards, 76th Academy Awards, 77th Academy Awards, 78th Academy Awards, 79th Academy Awards and 80th Academy Awards (1997–2008).

== Career ==
He has directed award ceremonies, such as the Academy Awards, Primetime Emmy Awards (winning seven and having twenty-one nominations), Grammy Awards, Golden Globe Awards, AFI Life Achievement Award, and the Kennedy Center Honors. Horvitz is a graduate of the University of California, Los Angeles.
