= Furniture retailer =

Company selling furniture

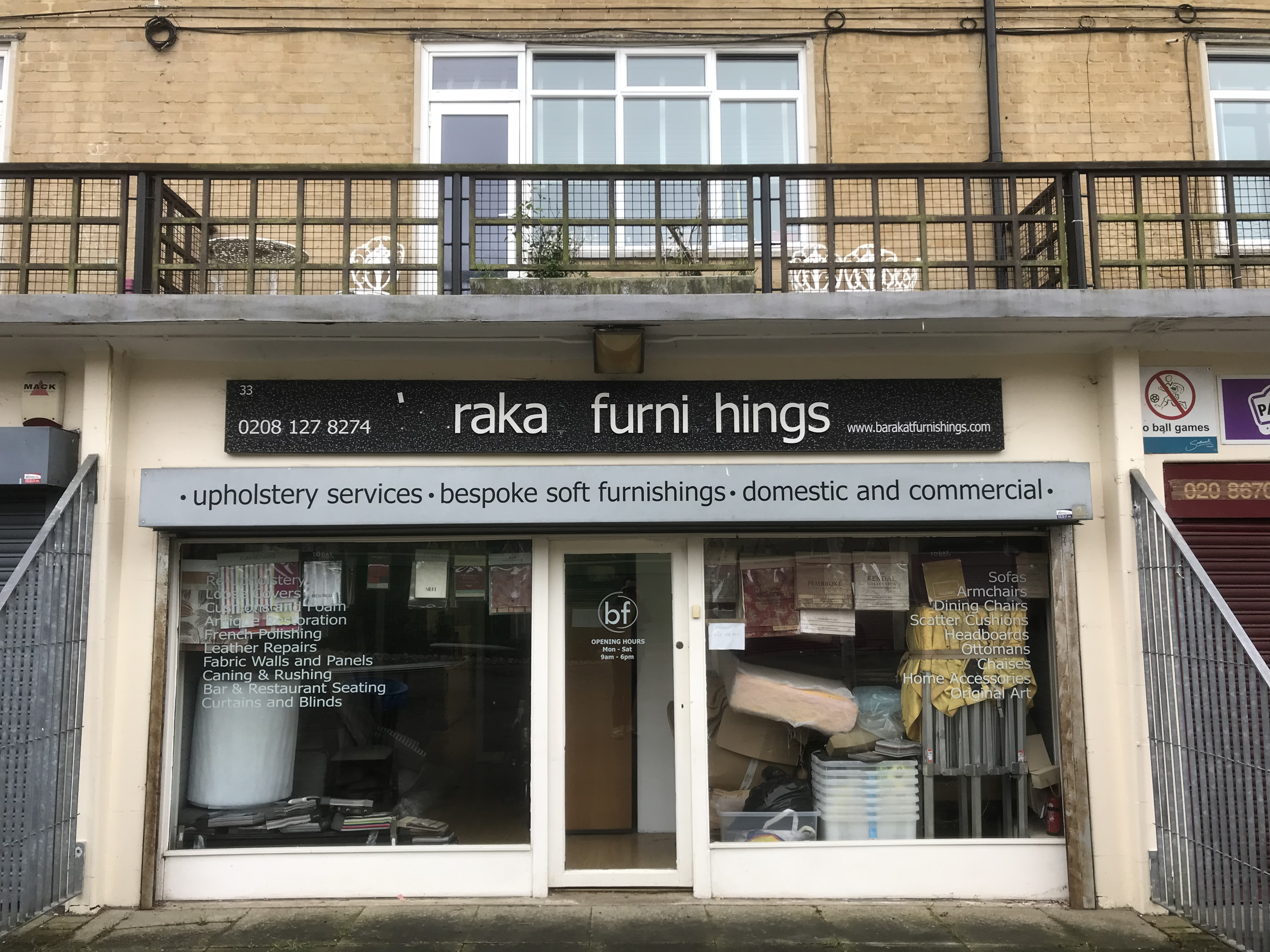
- A furniture shop in Kingswood Estate, London
- Industry: Retail
- Key people: Ingvar Kamprad; Arthur Lasenby Liberty
- Products: Furniture

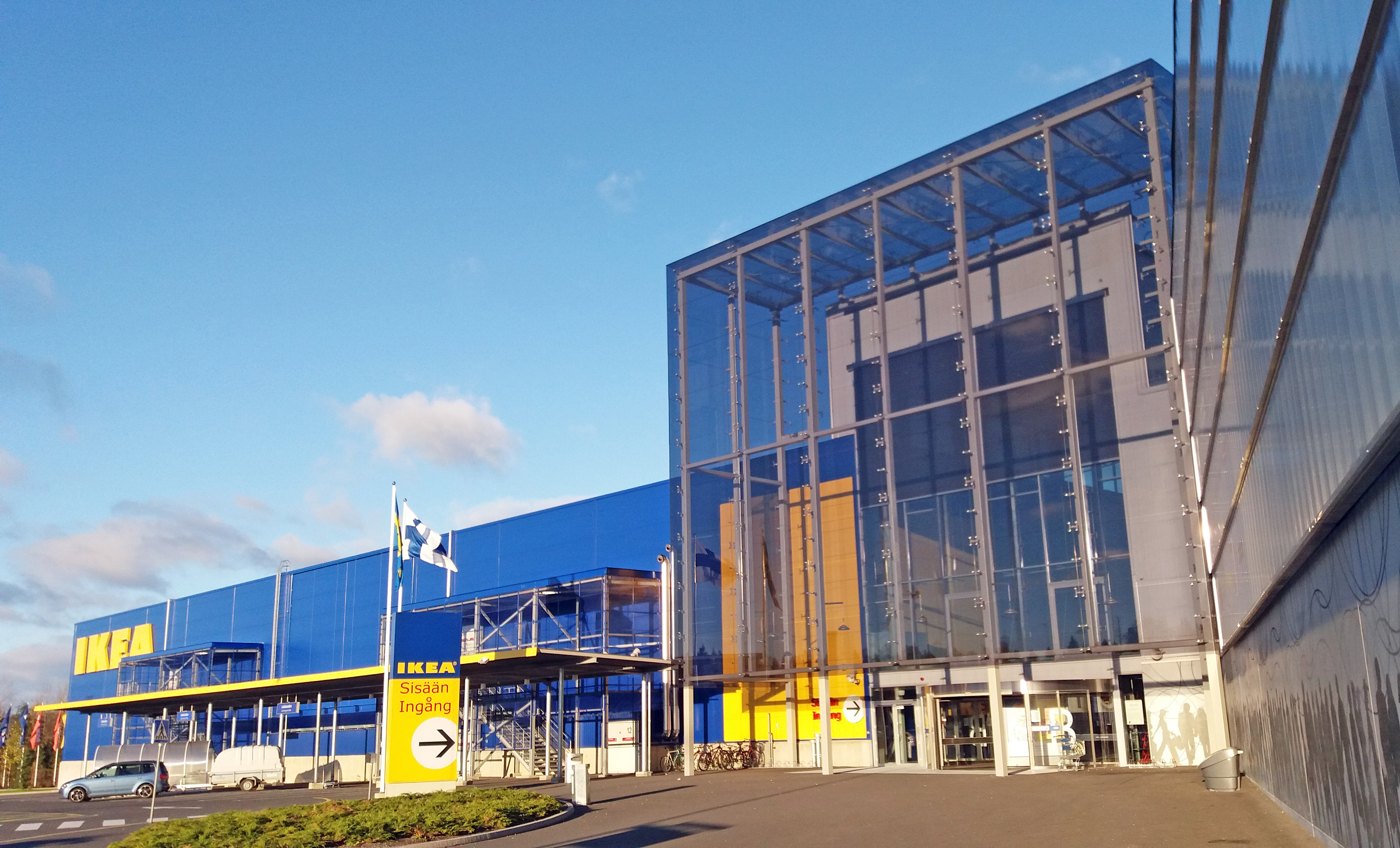
Exterior of IKEA store in Kuopio, Finland

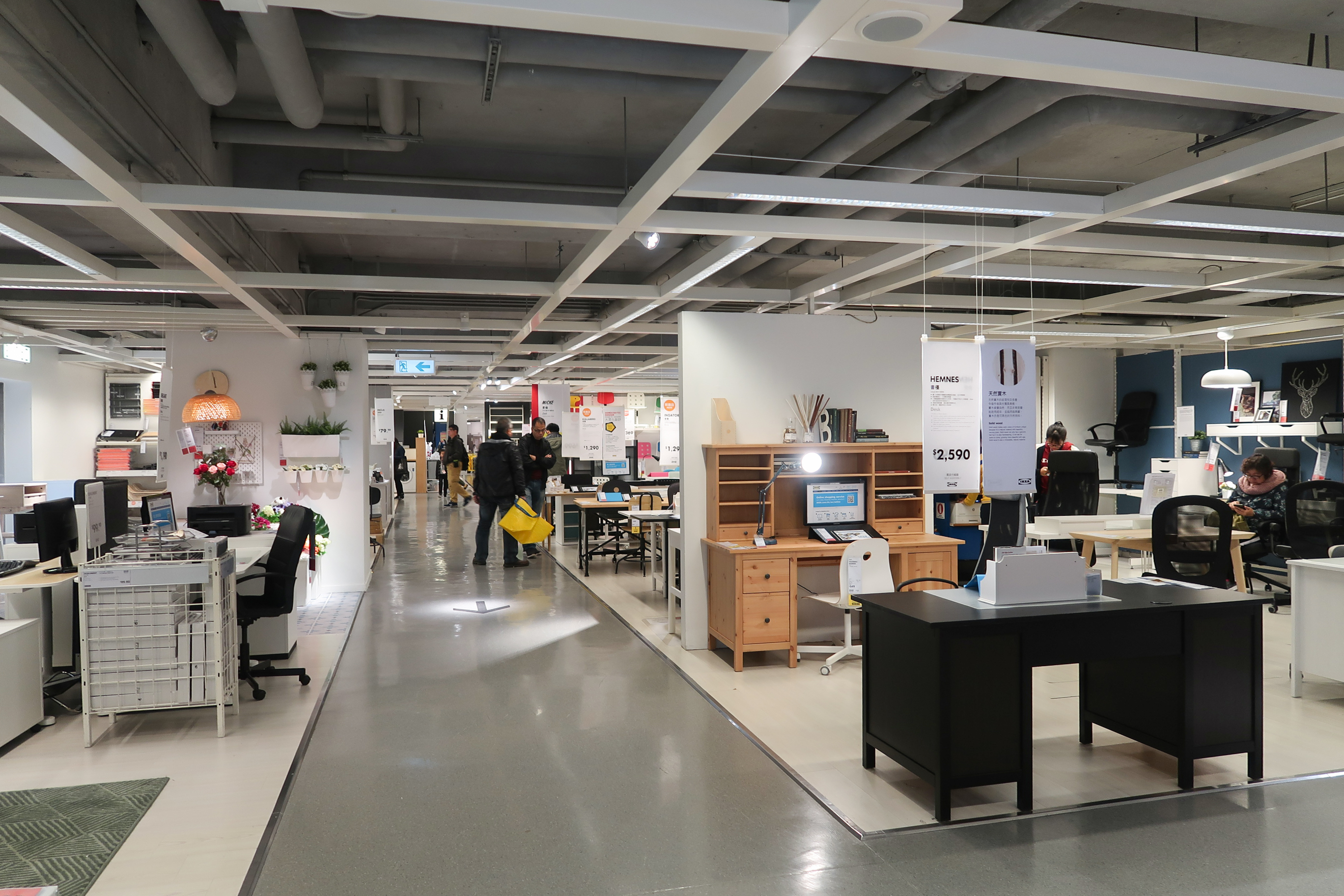
Interior of IKEA store in Hong Kong

A furniture retailer, furniture store or furniture shop is a retail business that sells furniture and related accessories. Furniture retailers usually sell general furniture (like beds, tables, bookcases and wardrobes), seats and upholstered suites (like couches or sofas and chairs), and specialised items produced for a commission. They may sell a range of styles to suit different homes and personal tastes, or specialise in particular styles like retro style furniture.

Many stores also sell outdoor or garden furniture, such as dining tables, coffee tables, seats and couches, which are designed to be waterproof, rust-resistant and weather-proof rather than to follow modern indoor design trends.

Furniture retail sales directly correlate with the state of the economy and housing market. When interest rates are lower and housing sales are higher, like in the United States in the early 1990s, sales of household and garden furniture increases. When business conditions are positive, like in the United States in the late 1990s, sales of furniture for offices, hotels and restaurants increases.

== History ==
The sector dates back the middle of the 19th century, when furniture sellers in North America and Europe began buying furniture from manufacturers at wholesale prices, and selling them to consumers in showrooms at higher prices. Many early showrooms had workshops to build specialty items.

By the early 20th century, most furniture production was concentrated in the United States, with major manufacturing centers in Jamestown, New York, High Point, North Carolina; and Grand Rapids, Michigan. However, hand-crafted items remained in demand and furniture factories remained small.

World War II created a global shortage of wood products, preventing the production of furniture.

The sale of mass-produced furniture in showrooms became more common in the second half of the twentieth century. The introduction of new materials, machinery, adhesives and finishes made it more difficult to distinguish between commercially produced and handcrafted furniture. Many furniture retailers formed exclusive relationships with furniture manufacturers.

== By market ==
=== North America ===
==== United States ====
- Aaron's, Inc.
- American Furniture Warehouse
- American Signature
- Arflex
- Arhaus
- Art Van Furniture
- Artisan Furniture USA
- Ashley HomeStore
- Badcock Home Furniture
- Barker Bros.
- Bassett Furniture
- Bob's Discount Furniture
- Bombay Company
- Cabinets To Go
- ColorTyme
- Conlin's Furniture
- Crate & Barrel
- Curacao
- Darvin Furniture & Mattress
- Dearden's
- El Dorado Furniture
- Ethan Allen
- Florian Papp
- Fradkin Brothers Furniture
- Furnitureland South
- Gardner-White Furniture
- Ginn's Furniture Store
- Grand Home Furnishings
- Gump's
- Havertys
- Heilig-Meyers
- Heritage Home Group
- HomeGoods
- IKEA
- J.B. Van Sciver Co.
- JCPenney
- Jennifer Furniture
- JoAnne's Bed and Back
- Jordan's Furniture
- Kaas Tailored
- Kirkland's
- The Land of Nod
- Levin Furniture
- LoveSac
- McMahan's Furniture
- Move Loot
- Nebraska Furniture Mart
- Norton Furniture
- One Workplace
- The Pace Collection
- Pier 1
- Plush Home
- Pottery Barn
- Raymour & Flanigan
- Relax The Back
- Rent-A-Center
- RH (company)
- Rhodes Furniture
- The Room Store
- Rooms To Go
- Scan Furniture
- Scandinavian Design
- Slumberland Furniture
- Star Furniture
- Storehouse Furniture
- Walter E. Smithe
- Wayfair
- West Elm
- RC Willey Home Furnishings
- Williams-Sonoma, Inc.
- Wolf Furniture
- World Market
- Yogibo
- Z Gallerie

==== Canada ====
- Artemano Canada
- Bouclair
- The Brick
- Cymax Group
- HomeSense
- Leon's
- LOVACO
- LW Stores
- J. Pascal's Hardware and Furniture
- Structube
- United Furniture Warehouse
- Wholesale Furniture Brokers
- XS Cargo

=== Europe ===
- Bene AG
- Beter Bed
- Bohus (retailer)
- Conforama
- Höffner
- IDEmøbler
- IKEA
- ILVA
- Maisons du Monde
- Kika

==== United Kingdom ====
- Arighi Bianchi
- Barker and Stonehouse
- Bensons for Beds
- Betta Living
- Boyes
- Christopher Pratts
- DFS Furniture
- Dreams
- Dwell (retailer)
- Feather & Black
- Furniture Village
- Great Little Trading Co
- Habitat (retailer)
- Harveys Furniture
- HomeForm Group
- House of Hackney
- Land of Leather
- Leekes
- Liberty
- Macy's
- Magnet Kitchens
- Maple & Co.
- MFI
- Multiyork
- Oak Furnitureland
- OKA Direct
- Perfecthome
- Peter Green
- Rosebys
- ScS
- Sharps Bedrooms
- Sofology
- Waring & Gillow

==== Serbia ====
- Forma Ideale
- SIMPO

==== Estonia ====
- Masku

=== Asia ===
- Courts Malaysia
- Courts Singapore
- Nitori
- Stellar Works

==== India ====
- Furlenco
- Godrej Interio
- Nilkamal Plastics
- Pepperfry
- Sarita Handa
- Urban Ladder

=== Oceania ===
- Amart Furniture
- Coco Republic
- Fantastic Furniture
- Freedom Furniture
- Harvey Norman
- Milan Direct
- Nick Scali Furniture
- Target Australia
- Temple & Webster
- Winning Appliances

=== Middle East and Africa ===
- The One
