= Marc Brown =

Marc Brown may refer to:

- Marc Brown (author) (born 1946), American author, creator of the Arthur books and television show
- Marc Brown (basketball) (born 1969), American basketball player and coach
- Marc Brown (ice hockey) (born 1979), Canadian ice hockey player and coach
- Marc Brown (American football) (born 1961), American football wide receiver
- Marc Brown (journalist) (born 1961), American news anchor for KABC-TV
- Marc Brown, spokesperson and owner of Norton Furniture

== See also ==
- Marc Brown Studios, television studio founded by the author Marc Brown
- Mark Brown (disambiguation)
- Mark Browne (disambiguation)
- Marcus Brown (disambiguation)
