= Noa Lindberg =

American actor, writer, producer, director

- נועה לינדברג
- Lindberg, with her book Sneaky Sneakerton - The Sock That Got Away
- Born: Israel
- Occupations: Actor; writer; director
- Website: noalindberg.com

Noa Lindberg (Hebrew: נועה לינדברג; born April 25) is an American actor, writer, producer, director, and author of Israeli and European descent. She acted in the Automated Selfie stick video, produced by Thinkmodo to promote TV Series UnReal Season 2 on Lifetime. The video went viral within hours and immediately reached millions of views and shares.

As a host, she has own interview show for iHeartRadio's Evolution 93.5. Artists she has interviewed include David Guetta, The Chainsmokers, Axwell & Ingrosso, Afrojack, Cheat Codes, Hardwell, Steve Aoki, Cash Cash, Craig David and Kygo.

She directed Tekashi 69's music video Bebe featuring Anuel, as well as Logan Henderson, Madison Beer, and Lovelytheband, at the iHeartRadio's Y100 Miami Jingle Ball 2018.

Lindberg is the author of the book Sneaky Sneakerton - The Sock That Got Away. The book was published at Sumbunny Books, in October 2020.

== Early life ==
Noa Lindberg was born in Israel and raised in Paris, France.

== Filmography ==
=== Film ===
Year	Title	Role
2018	Soils of Evil	Isabel Berkowitz
2018	The Welder	Alma
2018	The Driven	Jacqualine Marquez
2018	Crocodylus	Vanessa
TBA	The Soiree	Alexis
2017	All Alone	Eva
2017	Make Love Great Again	Jane
2017	Side Effects	Becky
2016	Sehnsucht	Anna
2015	Nemesis	Lisa
2015	Entourage	Yacht Girl
2014	Chef	Jogger
2013	Iron Man 3	Michele Cusick
2011	Equal Strength	Eva Williams
2001	Vidocq	Vierge<

=== Television ===
Year	Title	Role	Network
2018	Mi familia perfecta	Recepcionista	Telemundo NBC Universal
2017	20/20 / Killer Clown	Marlene Warren	ABC
2016	UnReal	Barbie aka Automated Selfie Stick Girl – Promo	Lifetime
2017	Selling Yachts	Tia	AWE TV
2018	The Fixer	Polly Di Lucia	TBA<
2017	Dr. Miami	Cindy	WE tv
TBA	Miamigos	Sam	TBA
2015	Gym Brats	Detective Collins	TBA
2013	Magic City	Hooker No. 1	Starz
2009	Tellement Vrai	Audrey	NRJ12
2002	La vie devant nous	Lyceenne	TF1
2014–present	All Access	Host	iHeartMedia
2013	Nutral TV	Host	Nutral TV
2010	DJ Story	Host	TBA
2003	Carte Blanche	Host	MCM

=== Commercials ===
Year	Brand	Role
2017	Tiffany & Co	Jewelry Model
2017	El Dorado Furniture / 50th Anniversary	Living Room Model
2017	El Dorado Furniture	Pool Model
2017	Toyota	Beach Girl in the Rain
2016	UnReal Season 2 on Lifetime	Automated Selfie Stick Girl
2016	Michaels Arts & Crafts	Girlfriend
2016	Aristada	Lisa / Schizophrenic Patient / Bicyclist
2016	State Farm	Chris Paul's Receptionist
2016	Zaxby's / Heart of Dallas Bowl	Young Mom
2015	Florida Lottery / Britto Scratch Off	Romero Britto Fan Wife
2014	Heineken / The Experiment	Star Dancer
2013	Regions Bank / Good With Money	Bridesmaid
2013	Schweppes Limon Dry / Iggy Pop	Rude Stare Woman

=== Music videos ===
Year	Artist	Song	Role
2015	Nick Jonas	Chains	Party Girl
2014	Enrique Iglesias & Pitbull	I'm a Freak	Party Crasher
2014	Armin van Buuren	Save My Night	Star Dancer
2017	Arsi Rey	Texto	Love Interest
2010	Shaggy & Bob Sinclar	I Wanna	Dancer
