= Manny Andruszewski =

English footballer (born 1955)

Personal information
- Full name: Emanuel Franciszek Andruszewski
- Date of birth: 4 October 1955 (age 71)
- Place of birth: Eastleigh, Hampshire, England
- Height: 6 ft 2 in (1.88 m)
- Position: Defender

Youth career
- Holy Cross F.C.
- 1970–1972: Southampton

Senior career*
Years	Team	Apps	(Gls)
1972–1980	Southampton	83	(3)
1979–1981	Tampa Bay Rowdies	30	(1)
1980–1981	Tampa Bay Rowdies (indoor)	13	(2)
1982	Southampton	0	(0)
1982–1983	Aldershot	25	(2)
1983–1984	Andover	?	(?)
1984	Houston Dynamos	?	
1984–1985	Dallas Sidekicks (indoor)	23	(0)
- * Club domestic league appearances and goals

Emanuel Franciszek Andruszewski (born 4 October 1955) is an English former footballer who played for Southampton. He played at full-back and centre-back during the late 1970s.

== Southampton ==
Born in Eastleigh, Hampshire, Andruszewski joined Southampton as an associate schoolboy in November 1970, having played for St. George's School and represented Southampton & Hampshire Schools. Ted Bates and Lawrie McMenemy signed him firstly as an amateur, and then, in October 1973, as a professional. He graduated through the reserves, making his first team debut on 1 February 1975, in a 3–0 victory away to West Bromwich Albion in League Division 2. Andruszewski replaced Steve Mills, who had been seriously injured in a road crash. He retained his place for the rest of the 1974–75 season, in which he made sixteen appearances. The following season, Saints had signed Peter Rodrigues and Andruszewski was to make only a handful of appearances in the first team, and did not figure at all in the squad that went on to win the FA Cup on 1 May 1976.

Over the next few seasons, he was unable to establish himself as a first choice player although he did make two appearances in the quarter-finals of the European Cup Winners' Cup against Anderlecht in March 1977.

He was an uncompromising tackler and was at his best when given a particular opponent to shadow and was often brought in to the side to perform a specific man-marking task. He rarely got forward into attack, but the few goals that he did score were usually fairly special. On 5 March 1977, he scored the winner against Charlton Athletic, when he crashed a shot past the keeper after running on to a return pass from Mick Channon.

In the 1977–78 season, he was selected fairly regularly including appearing in the final 13 games as Saints finished as runners-up (to Bolton Wanderers) to gain promotion back to Division 1.

His finest game for the Saints was against Birmingham City in the Football League Cup on 29 August 1978, when he shackled Trevor Francis so well that Saints were able to notch up a 5–2 victory, which set them on the way to the League Cup final at Wembley against Nottingham Forest on 17 March 1979. Although Andruszewski had featured in several of the earlier games, he did not even make the bench for the final.

== Tampa Bay Rowdies ==
Andruszewski spent most of the summer of 1979 on loan to the Tampa Bay Rowdies of the NASL appearing in 16 games and was a starter in Soccer Bowl '79. Back in England he continued to make occasional appearances over the next season, before being transferred for £150,000 to Tampa Bay in May 1980. His period in the USA was not a great success and was cut short by illness.

He briefly returned to The Dell in 1982, although he made no further first-team appearances. In all he made exactly 100 appearances for Southampton's first team, scoring 3 goals.

== Aldershot ==
In the season 1982–83, he signed for Aldershot, and then returned to the US to join the Houston Dynamos for the summer of 1984, and then the Dallas Sidekicks indoor soccer team from November 1984 to May 1985.

== After football ==
After retiring from football, he worked for Peter Green furniture stores and in 2005 he set up his own gardening business in Eastleigh.
