= BrightHouse (retailer) =

British former rent-to-own retailer

- Company type: Subsidiary
- Industry: Retailer
- Founded: April 1994
- Defunct: 30 March 2020
- Fate: Administration
- Headquarters: Watford, United Kingdom
- Number of locations: 270 stores
- Area served: United Kingdom
- Key people: Alan Gullan (interim CEO)
- Products: Furniture; Consumer electronics Household appliances
- Number of employees: 2,400 (February 2020)
- Parent: Apollo Global Management
- Website: www.brighthouse.co.uk

Caversham Finance Limited, trading as BrightHouse, was the largest rent-to-own company in the United Kingdom, with 270 stores. It was a national chain that provided home electronics, domestic appliances, household furniture, other related products on a hire purchase agreements. Cash loans were offered towards the end of the company's existence.

Caversham Finance Limited was owned by private equity firm Apollo Management.

In October 2017, the company was ordered by the financial regulator, the Financial Conduct Authority, to pay 249,000 customers £14.8m due to the firm not compensating customers who had cancelled agreements after one down payment and to those who signed up to "unaffordable" lending agreements. The FCA said the retailer had not been a "responsible lender" and had treated customers unfairly.

On 30 March 2020, Grant Thornton were appointed as administrators. BrightHouse collapsed as "the company had been struggling after an influx of compensation claims for selling to people who could not repay. Its shops were then shut owing to coronavirus restrictions on retailers."

== History ==
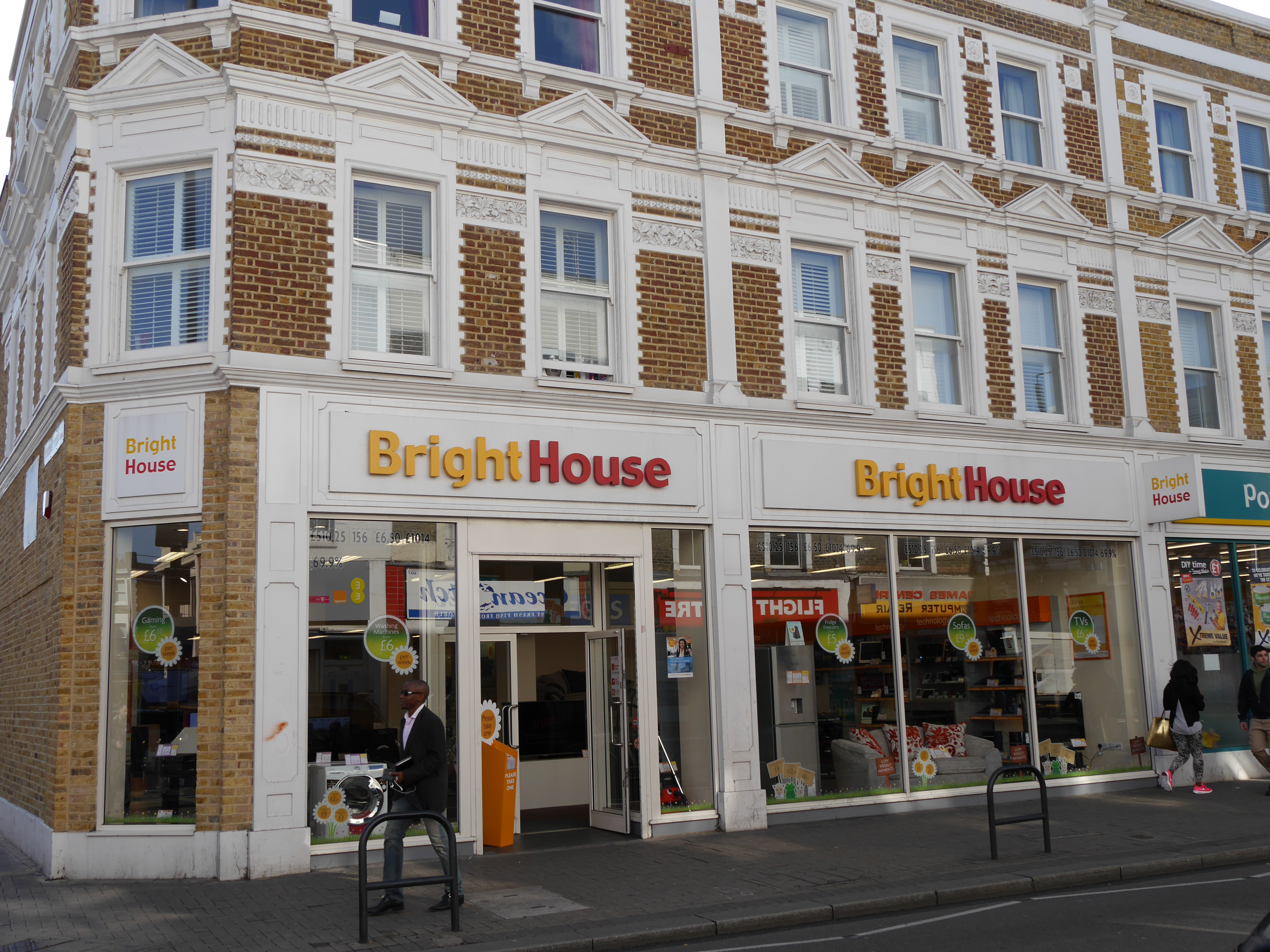
BrightHouse, North End Road, Fulham, London

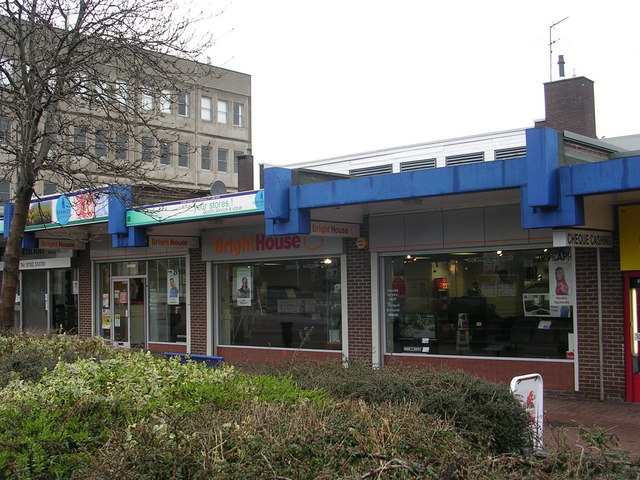
A branch of BrightHouse in Bramley, Leeds

Brighthouse was founded by Thorn EMI in April 1994 as Crazy George, and intended to be a sister company to Radio Rentals.

Crazy George was rebranded as BrightHouse in 2002.

Caversham Finance Limited, having been initially a subsidiary of Thorn Group plc, was taken private in September 1998 in a deal arranged and financed by the Principal Finance Group of Nomura (now reconstructed as Terra Firma Capital Partners). The company was bought by Vision Capital in July 2007. It was later sold to Apollo Management in December 2017.

Brighthouse employed more than 3,000 staff as of 2012. and had 311 stores as of January 2017.

Brighthouse's revenue was £351.7 million for the year ending 31 March 2015, and its pre-tax profits were £19.6 million.

In 2017, Brighthouse submitted a reform plan to its regulator, the Financial Conduct Authority, following criticism of its lending practices, and announced plans to close 28 stores. On 5 February 2019, Brighthouse announced that 30 stores were set to close due to poor trading conditions.

In February 2020, in their quarterly report, the company said it was seeking to move away from rent-to-buy, instead wanting to "shift towards cash loans in due course." In March 2020, shortly after the UK lockdown, the holding firm of BrightHouse, Caversham Finance Limited, called in administrators.

== Product offerings ==
BrightHouse previously stocked brands that included Samsung, Sony, Philips, Acer, LG, Nintendo, Baird, Whirlpool, Beko, BlackBerry, and Nokia. The company charged interest of between 69.9% and 99.9% APR, and also charged for delivery, installation, and compulsory warranties. An investigation by the BBC's Victoria Derbyshire programme in 2016 cited an example of a washing machine costing £358, with a £55 delivery and installation charge and compulsory £136 warranty. The total cost of the appliance was £1,092 at Brighthouse's typical interest rate of 69.9%.

Some sources suggested Brighthouse made it impossible to compare prices, though ex-chief executive Leo McKee (current Hamish Paton) said the retailer benefitted through a "really obsessive" approach to customer service, with "aspirational products at very competitive prices", claiming that though an active comparison is not obvious, it actively compared with other retail competitors; The Co-operative and Amazon.com.

Furniture accounted for about 20 per cent of sales, audio and visual for 30 per cent, domestic appliances for 20 per cent, and technology for 30 per cent.

== Awards ==
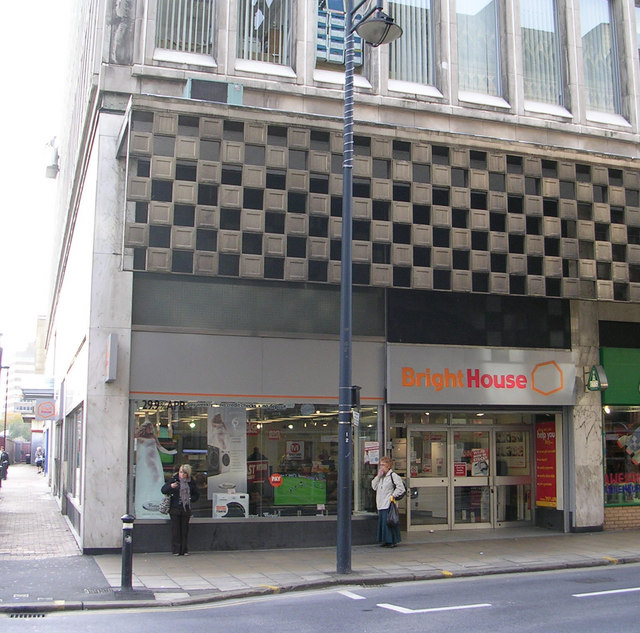
A branch in Bradford.

In 2008, BrightHouse won Best High Street Recycler at the National Recycling Awards. Moreover, the company won a Green Apple Award for Environmental Best Practice.

== Charity and partnerships ==
In October 2007, BrightHouse announced an exclusive agreement with Five to sponsor the Trisha Goddard show.

BrightHouse partnered the NSPCC in 2009. As well as running various fundraising events for the charity, BrightHouse has posters and promotional material in their stores to raise awareness.

== Criticism ==
=== Business practices ===
In May 2009, an investigation by BBC Newsbeat suggested that BrightHouse mistreated customers who missed payments. A former employee told Newsbeat that the company tried to repossess goods without obtaining a court order, saying "We would just lie our way around it. Tell them we had the legal right to be there, and refuse to leave until they gave us the stuff." Commercial director Hamish Paton denied the company mistreated its customers, saying "We would only ever take the goods with the consent of the customer". Chris Tapp, director of charity Credit Action called for the Office of Fair Trading to investigate.

The company's lending practices have been criticised for targeting the "poorest, most desperate families" and operating in the "most deprived areas" of the UK. Other customers end up paying more than twice what they would have paid without BrightHouse's finance charges.

In 2015, BrightHouse, along with its two largest competitors PerfectHome and Buy as You View, were criticised by the All Party Parliamentary Group on Debt and Personal Finance. According to Parliamentary group chair Yvonne Fovargue, "Rent-to-own stores like BrightHouse charge inflated prices to some of the poorest people in the country. Customers are often obliged to take out additional warranties and insurance, as a result paying several times the true value of the goods." BrightHouse chief executive Leo Mckee defended the company, saying that "We are proud to serve our customer base of lower income families. The service we provide gives them access to high-quality products for their homes at competitive prices."

In 2016, former Labour Party leader Ed Miliband joined a campaign against BrightHouse in his Doncaster constituency, begun by South Yorkshire Credit Union and its CEO Murdo Macleod. Miliband accused the company of trying to "fleece" customers with expensive insurance and of harassing people who fall behind on their payments, and urged the public to use a local credit union instead.

An investigation for the BBC's Victoria Derbyshire programme in 2016 found that the company was selling to vulnerable people. The programme cited an example of a man with learning difficulties and mental illness who was paying BrightHouse for five separate items out of his benefit payments. It also featured an autistic man who purchased a PlayStation 4 from BrightHouse despite not understanding the contract, according to his mother who intervened on his behalf to get the contract cancelled.

=== Tax avoidance ===
In January 2015, Private Eye reported that BrightHouse had paid very little UK corporation tax between 2007 and 2014 – less than £6m – after revenues of £1.6bn and operating profits of £191m. According to Private Eye, interest of £76m owed to a Luxembourg-registered subsidiary of BrightHouse's then owners Vision Capital had significantly reduced taxable profits. In addition, records showed BrightHouse's '5 star' insurance to be operated through a sister company based in Malta, where tax on profits would in effect be no more than 5 per cent under Maltese law. BrightHouse told Private Eye it complies with all relevant tax regulations and that all its arrangements were agreed with HMRC.

In 2017, The Guardian disclosed details from the Paradise Papers that Queen Elizabeth II had invested some money in the company over a 12-year period via the Duchy of Lancaster.
