= Grand Home Furnishings =

American regional furniture retailer

- Type: Private
- Industry: Furniture retailers
- Predecessor: Grand Piano Company (1911-1998)
- Founded: 1911
- Headquarters: Roanoke, Virginia
- Number of locations: 18 stores (Virginia, Tennessee, West Virginia)
- Key people: George B. Cartledge, III (President)
- Products: Furniture, Bedding, Mattresses
- Revenue: ▼US$129.4 million (2016)
- Website: www.grandhf.com

Grand Home Furnishings is a regional chain of furniture stores headquartered in Roanoke, Virginia, in the United States. Grand operates eighteen retail stores in Virginia, Tennessee, West Virginia, and Maryland. Grand has a warehouse furniture outlet in Roanoke. Grand's stores and outlets are supplied by four distribution centers in Virginia and one in Tennessee.

== History ==
The chain's first location was opened in downtown Roanoke in 1911 under the name Grand Piano Company and specialized in pianos, other musical instruments and related merchandise. During the 1930s, the company added furniture, radios and phonographs. When purchased in 1945 by the Cartledge family, the name was changed to the Grand Piano and Furniture Company. In the 1950s, the chain began to expand outside of Roanoke into Southwest Virginia, the Shenandoah Valley and, eventually, other states.

Grand eventually stopped selling pianos and assumed its current name, Grand Home Furnishings, in 1998. Many in the Roanoke area still commonly refer to the chain as Grand Piano.

Grand may be best known for offering a cold, eight-ounce bottle of Coca-Cola to customers as they enter the store. The tradition began at a Lynchburg, Virginia, store opening in 1953 and was soon adopted by the entire chain. Grand hands out over one million bottles of Coke per year.

Grand built a free standing location at Valley View Mall in 1991. This new store became the chain's flagship in the Roanoke area after the closure of its landmark downtown Roanoke location in the late 1990s.

Grand has made NASCAR cross promotions a primary focus of its marketing efforts since the 1990s. The company was a sponsor of the Winston Cup Wood Brothers racing team based in Stuart, Virginia, until 2004, and its drivers and cars frequently made promotional appearance at the chain's stores. Grand currently sponsors Kevin Wood's No. 20 Grand Home Furnishings Ford in the NASCAR sanctioned Whelen All-American Series.

In 2017, the industry newspaper Furniture Today ranked Grand Home Furnishings as the 55th largest furniture retailer in the U.S. with annual sales of US$129.4 million.

Distributions centers are located in Virginia, West Virginia and Tennessee.
