= Marcus Brown (disambiguation) =

Marcus Brown (born 1974) is an American retired basketball player.

Marcus Brown may also refer to:

- Marcus Brown (cornerback, born 1986), American football cornerback
- Marcus Brown (cornerback, born 1987), American football cornerback
- Marcus Brown (politician), member of the Connecticut House of Representatives
- Marcus Brown, also known as Nourished by Time, American singer and producer

== See also ==
- Marcus Browne (born 1990), American boxer
- Marcus Browne (footballer) (born 1997), British footballer
- Marc Brown (disambiguation)
