= Mark Browne =

Mark Browne may refer to:

- Mark Browne (footballer) (born 1954), Australian rules footballer
- Mark Browne (politician) (born 1993), Canadian politician
- Mark Browne, member of Clock (American band)
- Mark Browne, character in Agnes Browne
- Mark Browne, 9th Viscount Montagu (1745–1797)

== See also ==
- Mark Brown (disambiguation)
- Marc Brown (disambiguation)
