= Tanglewood Mall =

Coordinates: 37°13′44.4″N 79°58′37.1″W

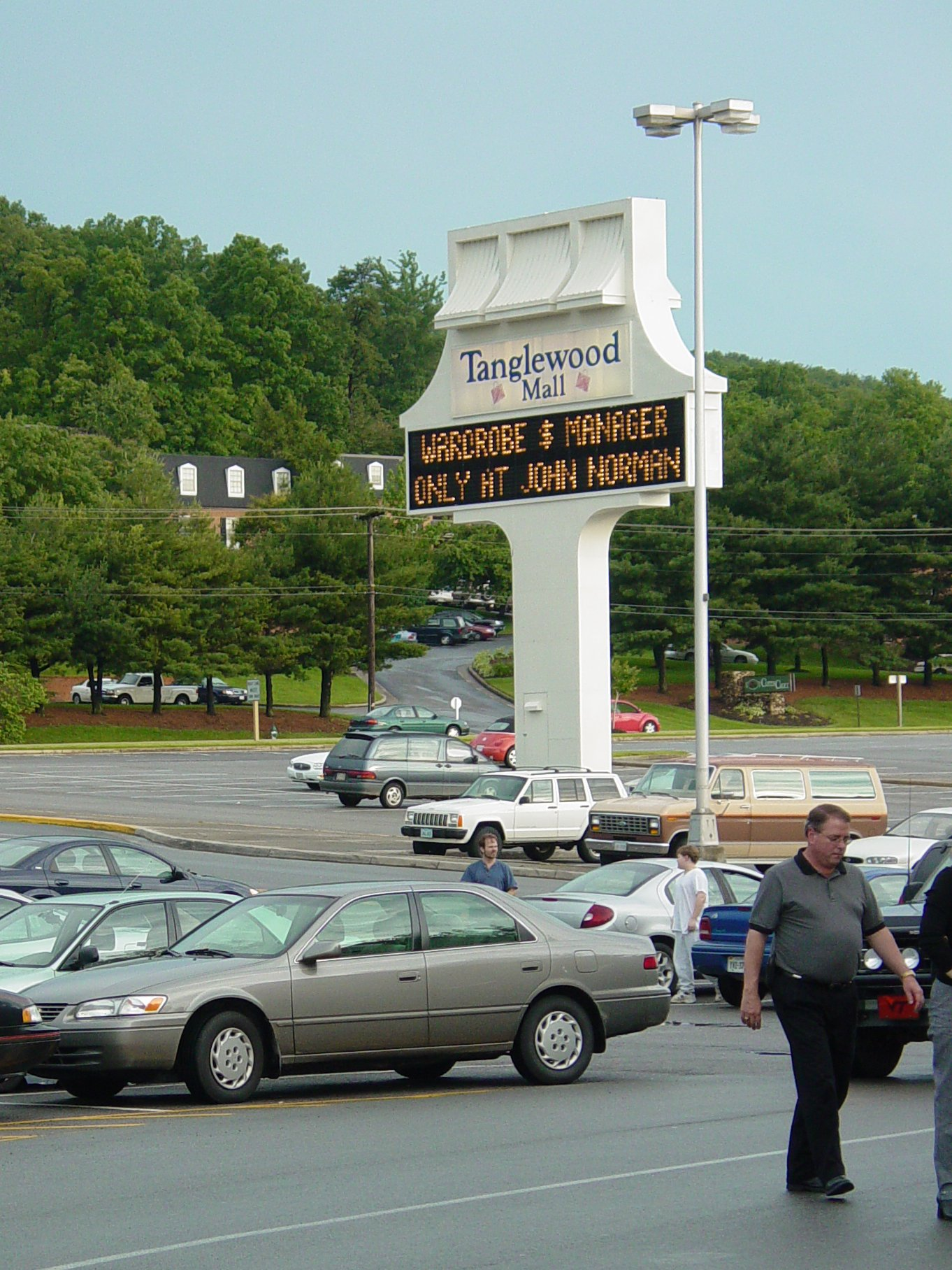
- Tanglewood Mall parking lot and sign, in 2003
- Location: Roanoke, Virginia; United States
- Address: 4420-A Electric Road
- Opened: 1973
- Developer: T.D. Steele
- Owner: Blackwater Resources
- Num. of anchor tenants: 7 (6 open stores, 1 open Hospital)
- Floor area: 788,600 square feet
- Floors: 2 (1 in TJ Maxx, Staples, Michael's & Former Stein Mart)
- Website: http://www.shoptanglewood.com/

Tanglewood Mall is a shopping mall in southwest Roanoke County, Virginia, United States. It originally opened for business March 28, 1973. The mall is currently managed by Hackney Real Estate Partners.

Tanglewood Mall is located at the intersection of US 220 and Route 419. The Roy L. Weber Expressway's southern terminus is the exit with 419.

== History ==
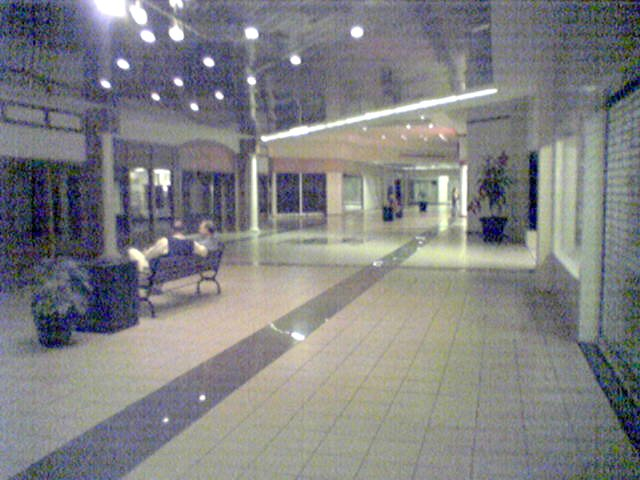
A "dead" wing of Tanglewood Mall, in 2004, before renovations began

Planning for Tanglewood Mall began in 1969, and construction commenced in 1971. When the mall opened in 1973, the original anchor stores were J. C. Penney, Leggett (now Belk), Woolco, Miller & Rhoads, and G.C. Murphy. The mall was, at the time, the largest shopping center west of Richmond, measuring at 658,000 square feet of gross leasable area with 4,000 parking spaces.

The mall's interior contained dark parquetry floors, tinted glass, modern lighting, and three large fountains. Another notable feature of the mall was the French Quarter, which was designed to look like a French village, with boutiques including a gourmet market and restaurant, DJ's Brasserie.

A convenience center opened adjacent to the mall in 1975, featuring Kroger and General Cinema.

G.C. Murphy left Tanglewood Mall in 1979. Following this departure, its upper level was reconfigured into a food court. The lower level became small shop space, with the former Murphy's escalator added to the mall common area.

Woolco closed its Tanglewood location in 1983, and the space was renovated to create a Brendle's catalog showroom, along with T. J. Maxx and additional small shop space.

The interior was renovated in 1985 following the opening of Valley View Mall, which swept away much of the 1970s-style decorative details, replacing them with softer colors and Mediterranean tile, as well as a passenger elevator.

Miller & Rhoads closed in 1989, with its space being subdivided among smaller stores. Goody's Family Clothing was added in 1995 in the former French Quarter space, and Stein Mart joined the same year.

In 1998, a 10-screen outparcel cinema opened. In 2005 the mall added a satellite of a Roanoke Science museum, entitled "Baby Dinosaurs at the Mall".

On March 17, 2017, J. C. Penney announced that they were closing their Tanglewood Mall location. The store closed on July 31, 2017.

Carilion Clinic announced that they were going to lease the J. C. Penney Space on September 26, 2019, Construction started several days later. They said it would be a Carilion Children's Clinic. They opened on October 6.

A.C. Moore opened in February 2006 in a section of previous storefronts, ahead of the proposed construction schedule of Renovations from 2005 to 2007. In March 2019, they announced that they were closing their Tanglewood Mall location. The store closed later in April.

Michaels bought the A.C. Moore space a few days after A.C. Moore closed.

On August 12, 2020, it was announced that Stein Mart would close this location as the chain is closing all locations.

=== Renovations (2005-2007) ===
The mall began renovations and construction in 2005, a process that continued until 2007. According to mall marketing manager Rebecca Spaid, the mall was reconfigured to make space for several new tenants, as well as refreshing the appearance of the mall's interior and exterior.

T. J. Maxx renovated the former Brendle's space and relocated in April. Home Goods Fused with T. J. Maxx in 2018. Nearby in-line space was also converted to two more junior anchors, one of which was Staples. The third "box", the only one that opened into the mall corridor, was vacant until Stein Mart moved in. In 2013, Furniture Warehouse moved into the former original Stein Mart location.

Steve & Barry's opened in October 2006, occupying approximately 48,000 square feet (4,500 m^{2}) on the second level, which includes the second level of the former T.J. Maxx space and the virtually empty food court, as well as several storefronts. The few tenants that had remained in the food court, including Chick-fil-A, have since re-located within the mall. On 18 September 2006, Chick-fil-A held its grand-reopening in a new location on the upper level, after a soft reopening on 16 September.

Kroger, an outparcel, finished renovating its interior and exterior; its new front was meant to "better highlight the company's selection of fresh foods." The renovations were also in anticipation of a Ukrops opening in 2007 a short distance away.

Mall marketing manager Rebecca Spaid commented, "Here We GROW Again is our theme for 2006 as construction gives Tanglewood Mall a facelift. With the addition of new tenants coupled with the relocation of popular tenants, we sport a fresh look and better opportunities to serve our customers." Despite the opening of Cheeburger Cheeburger, Tanglewood still features many vacancies, such as the newly vacated Goody's and Steve & Barry's. Together, the two stores occupied most of the upper level. The Goody's store became a branch of Miller-Motte Technical College in 2010 until 2021.

=== Renovations (2021) ===
On January 15, 2021, a new Kroger gas station opened near Kroger and Firestone garage.

On February 24, 2021 Panda Express, Jersey Mikes, Aspen Dental, Blaze Pizza and Chipotle announced they would be going into the Tanglewood Mall space in front of Carilion Clinic, construction started in March.

On August 25, 2021, they announced that Chili's and Popeyes will also go in the Tanglewood Mall space, They will go in front of T.J. Maxx and Staples and beside Panera Bread. Construction started in 2022. Also, Burlington opened that same year in the former Stein Mart space.
