= Mark Brown =

Mark Brown may refer to:

== Politics ==
- Mark Malloch Brown (born 1953), United Kingdom politician
- Mark Brown (Cook Islands) (born 1963), Cook Islands politician and Cabinet Minister
- Mark P. Brown (born 1956), former political candidate of the U.S. Democratic Party

== Sports ==
- Mark Brown (footballer, born 1981), Scottish football goalkeeper (Motherwell, Inverness, Celtic, Kilmarnock, Hibernian, Ross County)
- Mark Brown (footballer, born 1984), Scottish football player (Alloa Athletic)
- Mark Brown (golfer) (born 1975), New Zealand golfer
- Mark Brown (linebacker, born 1961), American football linebacker for the Miami Dolphins and Detroit Lions
- Mark Brown (linebacker, born 1980), American football linebacker for the New York Jets and Arizona Cardinals
- Mark Brown (cricketer) (born 1958), Welsh cricketer
- Mark Brown (baseball) (born 1959), American former professional baseball pitcher
- Mark Brown (athlete) (born 1962 or 1963), Paralympic athlete from Great Britain and Gibraltar
- Mark Brown (rugby union) (born 1958), Welsh rugby union player

== Other uses ==
- Mark Henry Brown (1911–1941), Canadian fighter ace during World War II
- Mark A. Brown (born 1961), American businessman and gaming industry executive
- Mark E. Brown (born 1960), American businessman
- Mark N. Brown (born 1951), NASA astronaut
- Mark Brown (conductor), British choral conductor, see Pro Cantione Antiqua
- Mark Brown, saxophonist and member of The Horne Section
- Mark Brown, creator of Game Maker's Toolkit and video game journalist
- Brownmark (born 1962), bassist for Prince's band the Revolution

== See also ==
- Marc Brown (disambiguation)
- Mark Browne (disambiguation)
