= Multiyork =

Former British furniture retailer

Multiyork Furniture Ltd
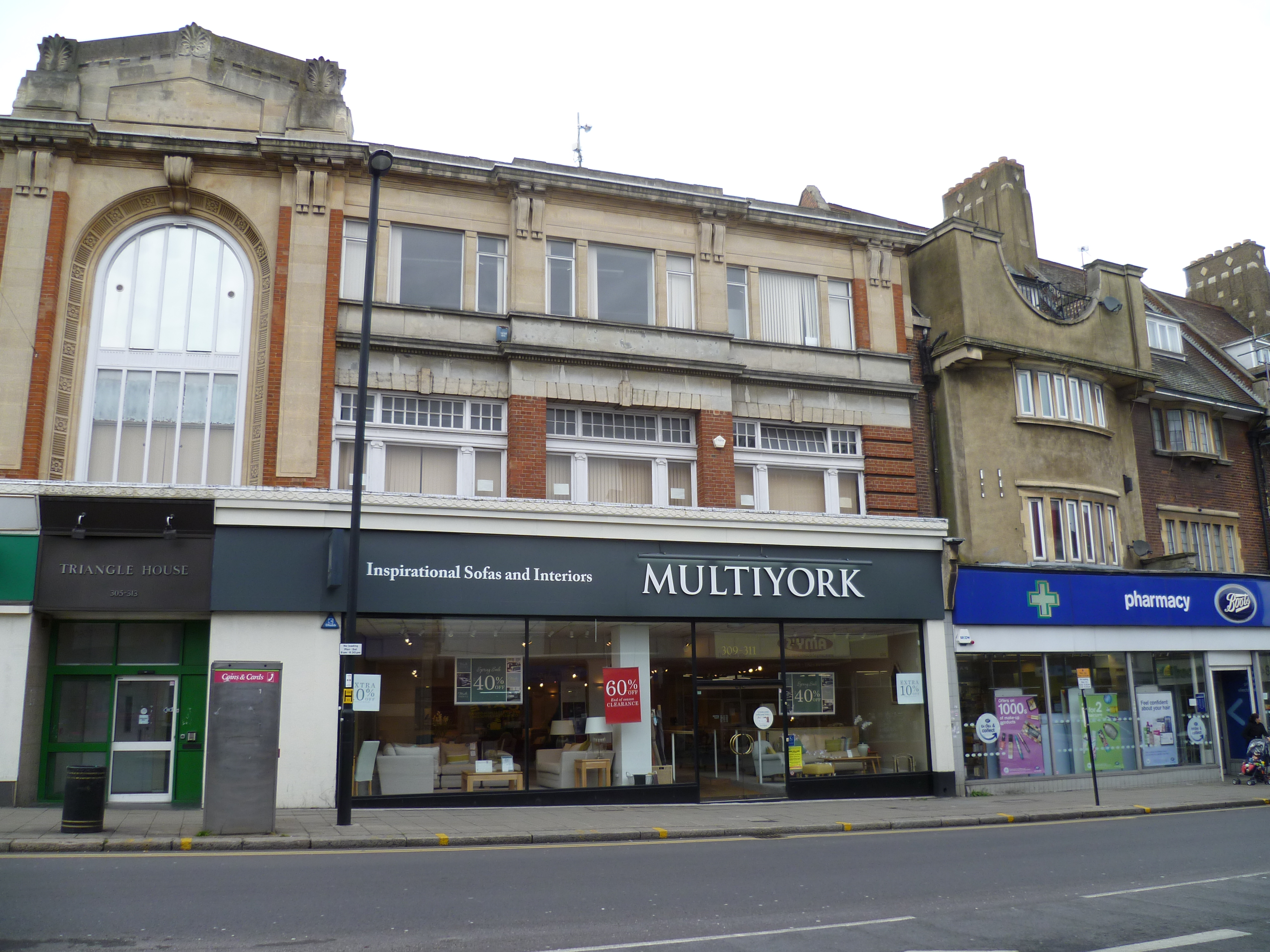
- Multiyork, Palmers Green
- Industry: Retail
- Founded: 1978
- Headquarters: Thetford, United Kingdom
- Number of locations: 50 (January 2017)
- Products: Furniture
- Owner: Charles Wade
- Number of employees: 547
- Website: www.multiyork.co.uk

Multiyork was a privately owned British furniture retailer based in Thetford, Norfolk. The company employed nearly 550 people in its 50 stores across the United Kingdom and its factory and head office in Thetford, where it was a major business. Multiyork was a member of the Worshipful Company of Furniture Makers and carried the Manufacturing Guild Mark.

The company entered administration on 22 November 2017, followed by its sister company Feather & Black on 27 November.

== History ==
Multiyork was founded in 1978 and initially operated in the Old Mill site in Mellis, a small village in Suffolk. Multiyork was purchased out of receivership by the Wade Furniture Group in February 1995. At that time there were 28 stores. The factory and Head Office have been based at Thetford in Norfolk since 1992 and in 2000 Multiyork expanded its site increasing factory capacity to the production of over 1,000 pieces of furniture a week.

Multiyork's 60th store opened in Lakeside Shopping Centre in Thurrock in October 2008 and was the first to follow a new lifestyle led in-store format.

== Administration ==
Multiyork entered administration on 22 November 2017, with around 550 jobs said to be at risk. An administrator cited a fall in consumer confidence.

In December 2017, DFS Furniture (DFS) reached an agreement to purchase the eight store leases, product designs, marketing databases and the Multiyork brand for £1.2 million. The deal also specified that as of 18 February, administrators will stop using the Multiyork brand. Six of the stores will reopen under the Sofa Workshop brand; the remaining two will open as branches of DFS.

== Craftsmanship ==
All Multiyork sofas were made at its Thetford factory. The company employed a team of 60 seamstresses who stitched the upholstery fabrics. Multiyork operated a sewing apprenticeship school to ensure that these skills were passed down from one generation to the next and to preserve the craft within the local region. Not only did Multiyork use their own fabrics but also offered designer fabrics such as Mulberry, Designers Guild, Arthur Sanderson, Romo and Jane Churchill.

== The factory store ==
Multiyork's factory outlet was run out of its original site in Mellis. The 10,000 sq ft (930 m^{2}) store had over 4,000 sq ft (370 m^{2}) dedicated to clearance stock, including ex display and end of line stock, as well as cancelled customer orders and customer returns.

== Fundraising ==
In 2009 Multiyork raised £25,000 for BBC Children in Need. The company's in-house design team created six limited edition Pudsey sofas, five of which toured its stores and travelled a total of 3,000 miles (4,800 km) between them to raise funds.

The sofas, which incorporated Pudsey Bear and the ‘We’re Supporting BBC Children in Need’ banner, were also featured on BBC One on the appeal night programme and were auctioned off through the BBC's Children in Need eBay auction to raise further cash.
