= Betta Living =

Former furniture retailer based in Northern England

- Company type: Private
- Industry: Retail
- Founded: Oldham, United Kingdom (1966)
- Headquarters: Oldham, United Kingdom
- Area served: United Kingdom
- Key people: Noel dean
- Number of employees: 38 (2014)

Betta Living was a home improvement retailer based in Oldham, Greater Manchester with stores in more than 70 towns and cities throughout England and Wales until it went bust in November 2016. Betta Living was owned by Dean House PLC and designs, manufactures and installs fitted kitchens, bedrooms and bathrooms. Betta Living's fittings were manufactured in Lancashire

== History ==
Betta Living was formed in 1966 under the name ‘Betta Bedrooms’ and remained that way until in 2000 it was taken over by current chairman, Noel Dean. Dean merged Better Bedrooms with his own company, the English Kitchen Company which he started in 1984. Noel Dean's credentials also include a period at The Burton Group, where he became the first ever Store Manager for Topman (formerly Mr Burt).

In 2008, Betta Living launched their first partnership, in which they supplied bedrooms to Blackburn-based kitchen firm Interior Contracts.

In 2012 Betta Living started supplying bathrooms following the acquisition of a number of Moben and Dolphin showrooms from HomeForm Group. That same year, Dean House PLC reported record year-end results, selling around 6,000 fitted kitchens per year as well as thousands of bedrooms. Betta Living saw sales across its shops rise by 22%, totalling £29.9 million by 20 November 2012

In 2013, Betta Living partnered with high street retailer Next plc. They sold fifty of their most popular kitchen designs through the brand, both online and in thirteen Next Home and Garden stores across the UK.

In 2014, Dean House PLC reported a 61% increase in year-on-year sales between Boxing Day and the height of the January trading period. This came after year-end results for 2013 showed a 23% increase in turnover, taking Betta Living's sales to £39 million. In April 2014, Betta Living announced the launch of its second partnership, this time with Dobbies Garden Centres.

On Friday 4 November 2016 Betta Living made an application to appoint an administrator. Anthony Collier and Benny Woolrych of FRP Advisory were appointed to handle the case. They completed the sale of Betta Living's order book, customer database and intellectual property for £3 and agreed a licence fee for plant and machinery of £12,000 plus VAT per month to We Fit Any Furniture, a company created by the former management of Betta Living and owned by Noel Dean.

== Philanthropy ==
Betta Living has held fundraising events for Macmillan Cancer Support since 2013. More than twenty of their stores take part in the annual Macmillan Coffee Morning. In June 2014, Betta Living raised £2,437 for Great Ormond Street Hospital whilst exhibiting at the Ideal Home Show. Later that year, Betta Living launched a campaign to raise awareness about Child Safety Week, publishing advisory articles and creating an interactive hazard awareness test for parents.
