= Höffner (furniture retailer) =

German furniture retailer

- Type: Private
- Industry: Furniture retail, home goods
- Founded: 1874
- Founder: Rudolf Höffner
- Headquarters: Schönefeld, Brandenburg, Germany
- Area served: Germany
- Products: Furniture, household goods, home accessories

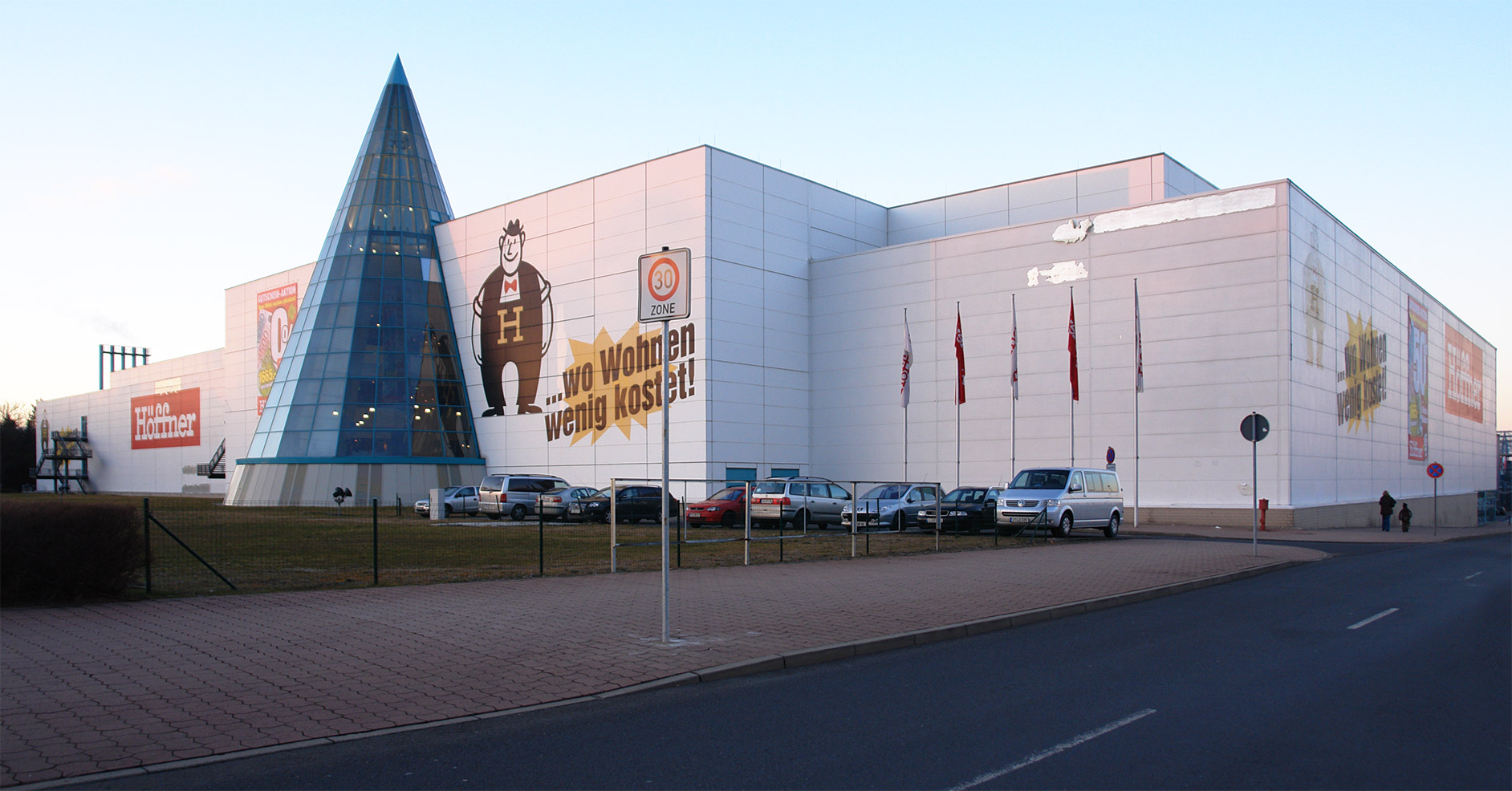
Store in Chemnitz, Germany

Höffner is a furniture retailer in Germany. The company is a full-range supplier in the home and furnishing sector. Its core range comprises around 100,000 products. In addition to furniture in a wide variety of styles, the company also offers household goods and home accessories.

== History ==
A company of that name was founded in 1874 by Rudolf Höffner, and became Berlin's biggest furniture retailer before World War II. Based in the eastern part of Berlin, the company was discontinued after the war. In 1967 Kurt Krieger bought the right to the name "Höffner" and created a new company under that name. This company was initially based in Berlin-Wedding, but the headquarters moved to Schönefeld, Brandenburg after Germany's reunification.

In 2007, the Höffner store in Barsbüttel was prohibited by the Lübeck Regional Court from advertising discounts if a price had previously been raised for a short time and then lowered again immediately afterwards. The background to this was the discovery by a couple looking for a couch set that an unrealistically high price had been advertised for a couch for a short time. Höffner cited price fluctuations on the part of the manufacturer as the reason, but these could not be proven. With the takeover and renaming of the Rösrath furniture center in Rösrath near Cologne in 2010 and the establishment in Duisburg, which was not yet realized in 2013, Höffner is continuing its expansion in western Germany. The strategy here is to enable larger sales areas, in some cases also merging locations as in Magdeburg in 2013. As part of a strategic realignment of Möbel Mahler to the southern German region, its store in Siebenlehn was sold to the Möbel Höffner Group on January 1, 2014, although it continues to operate under the Möbel Mahler brand. As many as two Höffner furniture stores opened or were completely remodeled and reopened in 2016 - in Berlin-Schöneberg and in Rösrath.

At the end of August 2018, it was announced that Höffner would take over the Paderborn-based furniture chain Finke, subject to the approval of the German Federal Cartel Office. The takeover was confirmed in November 2018.

In January 2021, Höffner became the target of numerous protests in Kiel when it became known that compensatory land (land earmarked to compensate for development on green belt land) had been cut down during construction work on the Kiel store in November 2020. The company described the event as an "oversight". In August 2023, the matter was clarified: the specialist horticultural company commissioned by Höffner paid a fine of 50,000 euros; Höffner itself was not affected, but had nevertheless donated 100,000 euros to the city for ecological and social projects in Schreventeich and Hasseldieksdamm in 2021.

Höffner's mascot is a man named Höffi wearing a hat and a red bow tie.
