= The One (company) =

Furniture retail company

THE One Total Home Experience
- Company type: Private
- Genre: Retail
- Founded: 1996; 30 years ago
- Founders: Thomas Lundgren
- Headquarters: Dubai, United Arab Emirates
- Area served: Middle East
- Key people: Thomas Lundgren (CEO)
- Products: Furniture; Accessories; Homeware; Tableware; Music
- Services: Home Styling; Free Delivery and Assembly; Interior Designer Programme
- Number of employees: 500
- Website: www.theone.com

The One Total Home Experience, stylised as THE One, is a furniture retail company founded by Swedish entrepreneur and philanthropist Thomas Lundgren.

== History ==
The One store opened in Abu Dhabi, United Arab Emirates, in 1996. In an interview with Arabian Business magazine, Lundgren says he was inspired by a dream he had in 1993, in which an angel came to him with a mission to save the world from IKEA.

In April 2007, The One was named one of the GCC's 50 Most Admired Companies by Arabian Business magazine.

In 2024, The One launched a new concept store in Dubai Hills Mall focused on the company's home furniture collections.

== Concept ==
According to CEO, Thomas Lundgren, The One's creative concept is to be magical and meaningful and "mass market, but to be prestigious with affordable prices". Lundgren claims to sell feelings rather than commodities and calls The One stores "theatres", where seasonal home fashion shows are staged. Each "theatre" set up by a team of decorators. The larger stores are furniture-driven with accessories complementing it and the smaller stores, or "Boutique Theatres", are accessory-driven with furniture incorporated to enhance the accessories.

Many stores include in-store restaurants.
