= Temple & Webster =

Australian furniture and homeware retailer

- Type: Public
- Traded as: ASX: TPW
- Industry: Online Retail
- Founded: 2011 in Sydney, New South Wales, Australia
- Founders: Mark Coulter, Adam McWhinney, Conrad Yiu, Brian Shanahan
- Headquarters: Sydney, Australia
- Areas served: Australia
- Products: Homewares, Furniture
- Website: templeandwebster.com.au

Temple & Webster is an Australian homewares and furniture retailer. The brand was founded in 2011, and listed on the ASX as Temple & Webster Group (TPW) in December 2015. The float followed the acquisition of two other businesses, the Australian operation of Wayfair and Milan Direct. In 2022, the company launched The Build, an online store for home improvement products.

== History ==
Temple & Webster was founded in 2011 by Mark Coulter, Adam McWhinney, Conrad Yiu and Brian Shanahan. The site was initially a members-only sales site, but became an open retailer in 2016 after merging the Wayfair brand.

In 2015 the company was awarded the Fastest Growing Internet Retailer in the Deloitte Tech Fast 50. Later that year the business released an IPO to raise $61 million, expecting a market capitalisation of $116 million. The IPO was oversubscribed, but shares fell over 30% on opening, taking their market value to $95 million. It was announced that, in 2015, Temple & Webster lost $44.4 million, more than double the $18.5 million loss forecast in its prospectus.

In December 2016 the business merged the Milan Direct ecommerce site into the Temple & Webster brand. Milan Direct continues to operate as a wholesaler and importer, supplying product to the Temple & Webster site.

In October 2019, Temple & Webster's sales rose by 45 per cent, the biggest increase since the company went public in 2015.

In May 2022, the company launched The Build by Temple & Webster, an online store for home improvement products.
