= Barker and Stonehouse =

English Furniture retailer

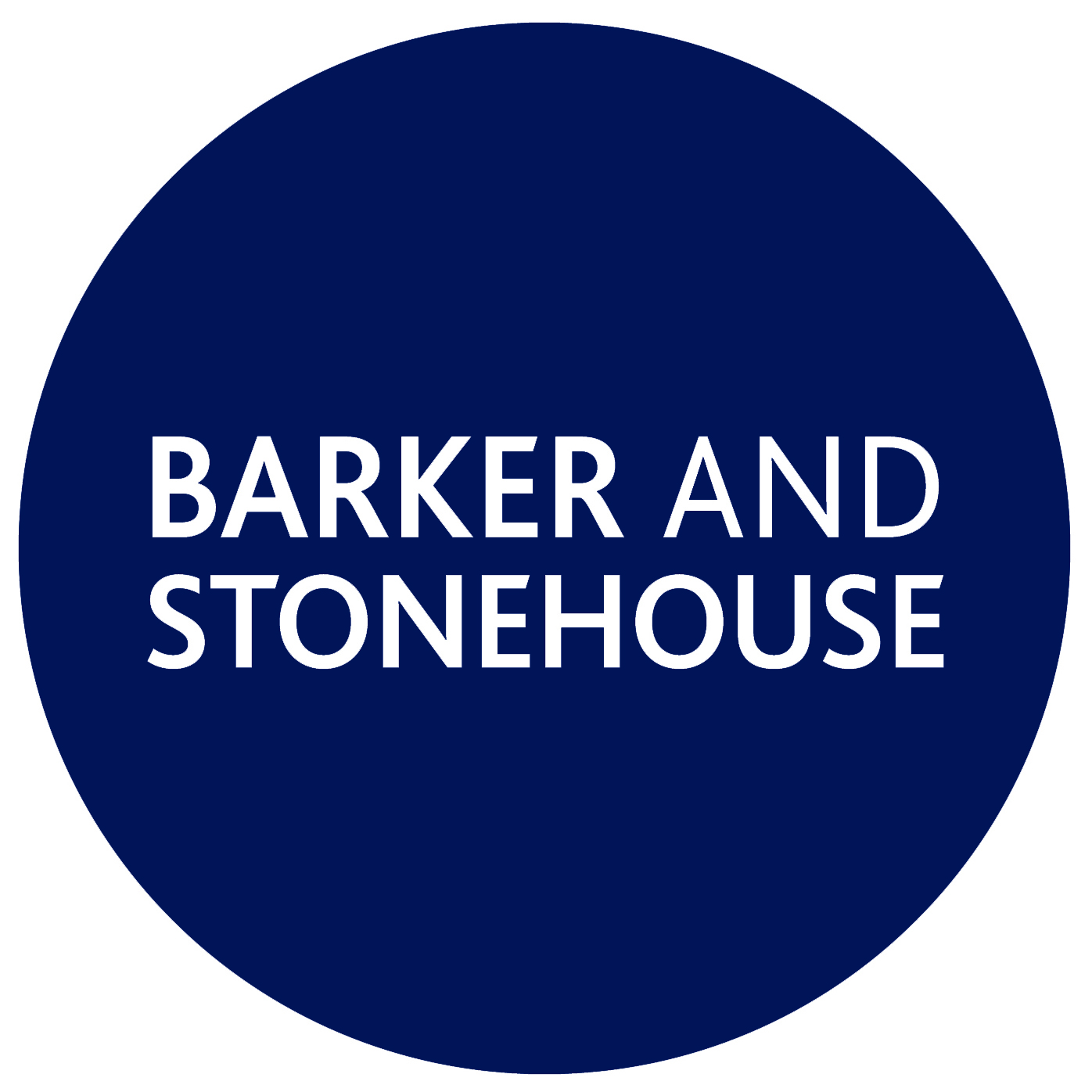
- Industry: Retail
- Founded: 1946; 79 years ago
- Founders: Charles Barker; Alex Stonehouse
- Headquarters: Stockton-on-Tees, UK
- Number of locations: 11
- Area served: England
- Products: Furniture; Sofas; Beds; Dining tables; Chairs; Office furniture; Children's furniture
- Website: www.barkerandstonehouse.co.uk

Barker and Stonehouse is a British independent furniture retailer. It has been a family-run firm since 1946 and was established in Stockton, County Durham.

Barker and Stonehouse stock a range of furniture including sofas, beds, dining room tables, chairs, office furniture, and children's furniture as well as designer brands such as Timothy Oulton, Stressless, Tempur and Ercol.

It has eleven branches, situated in Newcastle upon Tyne, Gateshead, Darlington, Knaresborough, Hull, Leeds, Nottingham, Battersea, and Thornaby; the Hove store opened in April 2017. The newest store in Guildford was opened in December 2017.

== History ==
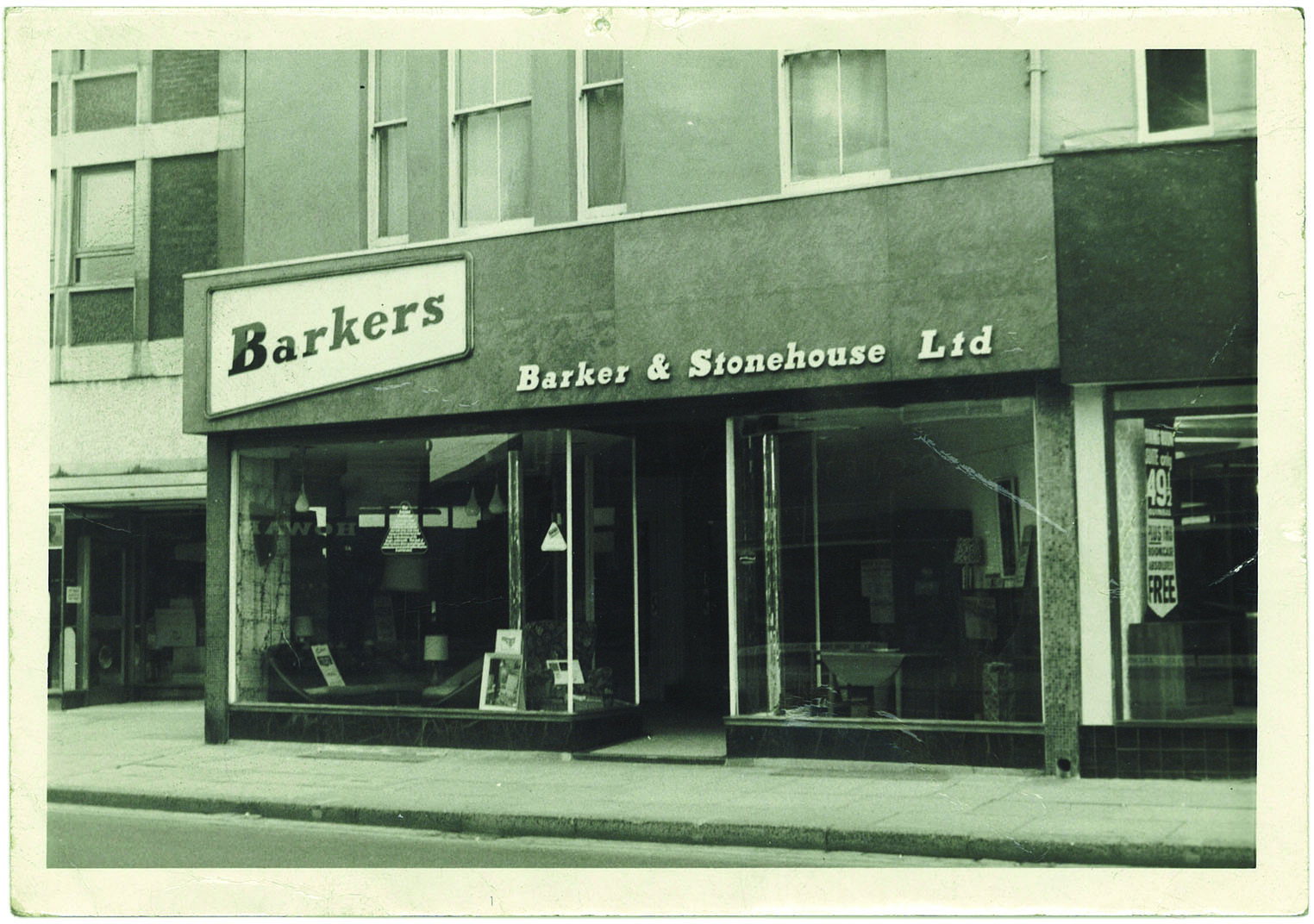
Barker and Stonehouse opened in 1946 in Bishopton Lane, Stockton.

Barker and Stonehouse was founded during the second world war by Charles Barker and Alex Stonehouse. The two RAF men decided to embark on their new business venture when they returned home, opening the first Barker & Stonehouse store in Bishopton Lane, Stockton, in early 1946.

They were joined by Charles’ brother, Frank Barker, in late 1946 when the first Middlesbrough store opened in Newport Road. This was followed by the Darlington store in 1953. In 1960, Charles Barker's son, and current chairman, Richard Barker, joined the company. Richard Barker went on to effect a management buy-out, acquiring Frank Barker's and Alex Stonehouse's shares making him majority shareholder and managing director of the business in 1974. A store in Bishop Auckland was opened in 1979, followed by a store in Newcastle upon Tyne in 1982.

In 1991, Richard's son, James, the current managing director, brought his own ideas to the business when he joined the company. James recognised the power of advertising, and launched the slogan "is your house a Barker & Stonehouse?"

== Charity tournament ==
A charity golf tournament organised by North East independent retailer Barker & Stonehouse raised £12,000 for the charity The Furniture Makers' Company.

== Locations ==
=== Thornaby ===
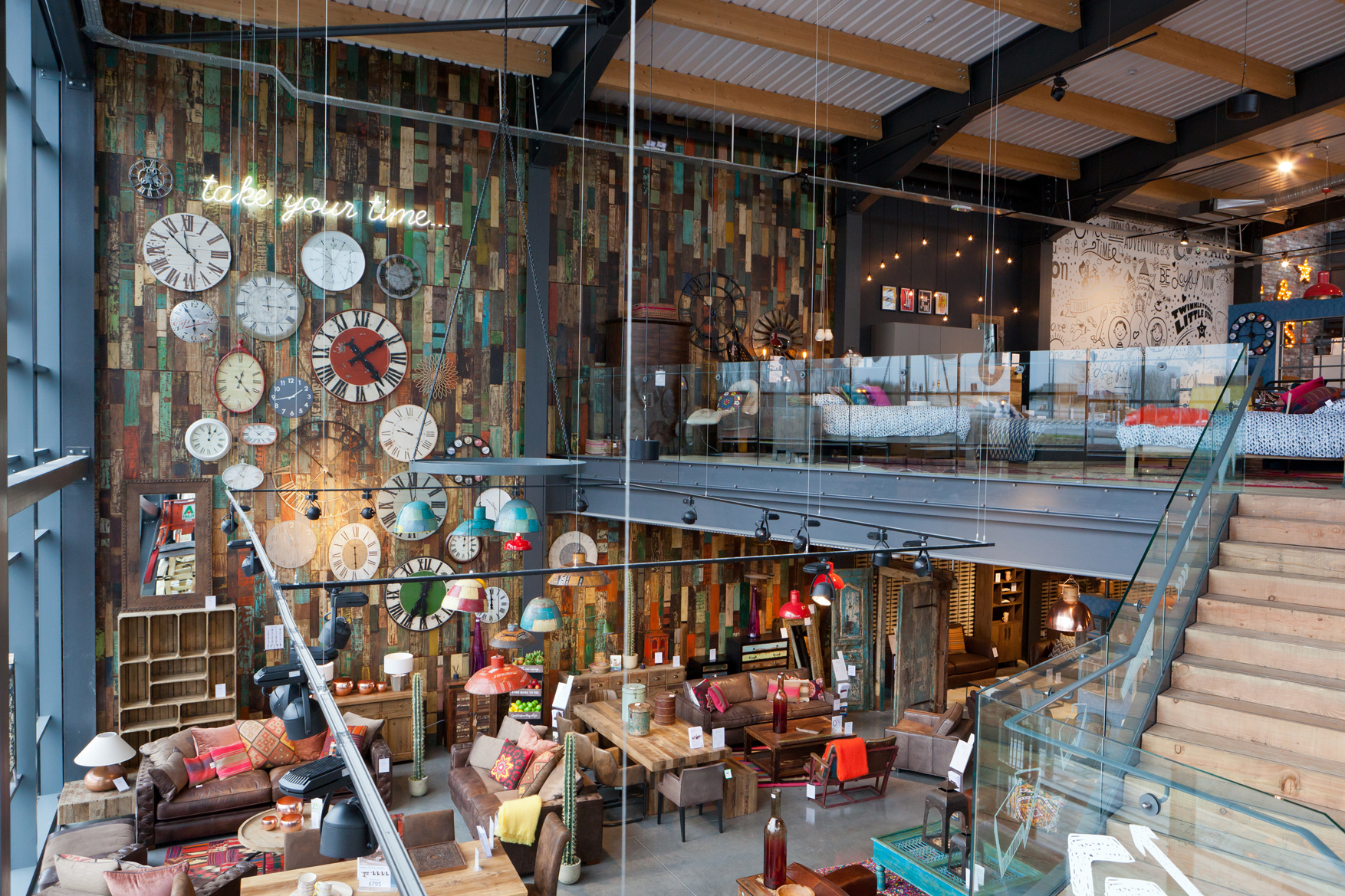
Barker and Stonehouse store in Teesside Park, Thornaby

Barker and Stonehouse's flagship store is located on Haydock Park Road in Teesside Retail Park, Thornaby. Opened in 2015 with special guest Mary Berry, the furniture store has an eco-friendly design, made from reclaimed materials and featuring a living wall with a self-sufficient water irrigation system. In-store café Chadwick & Co is located on the second floor.

=== Knaresborough ===
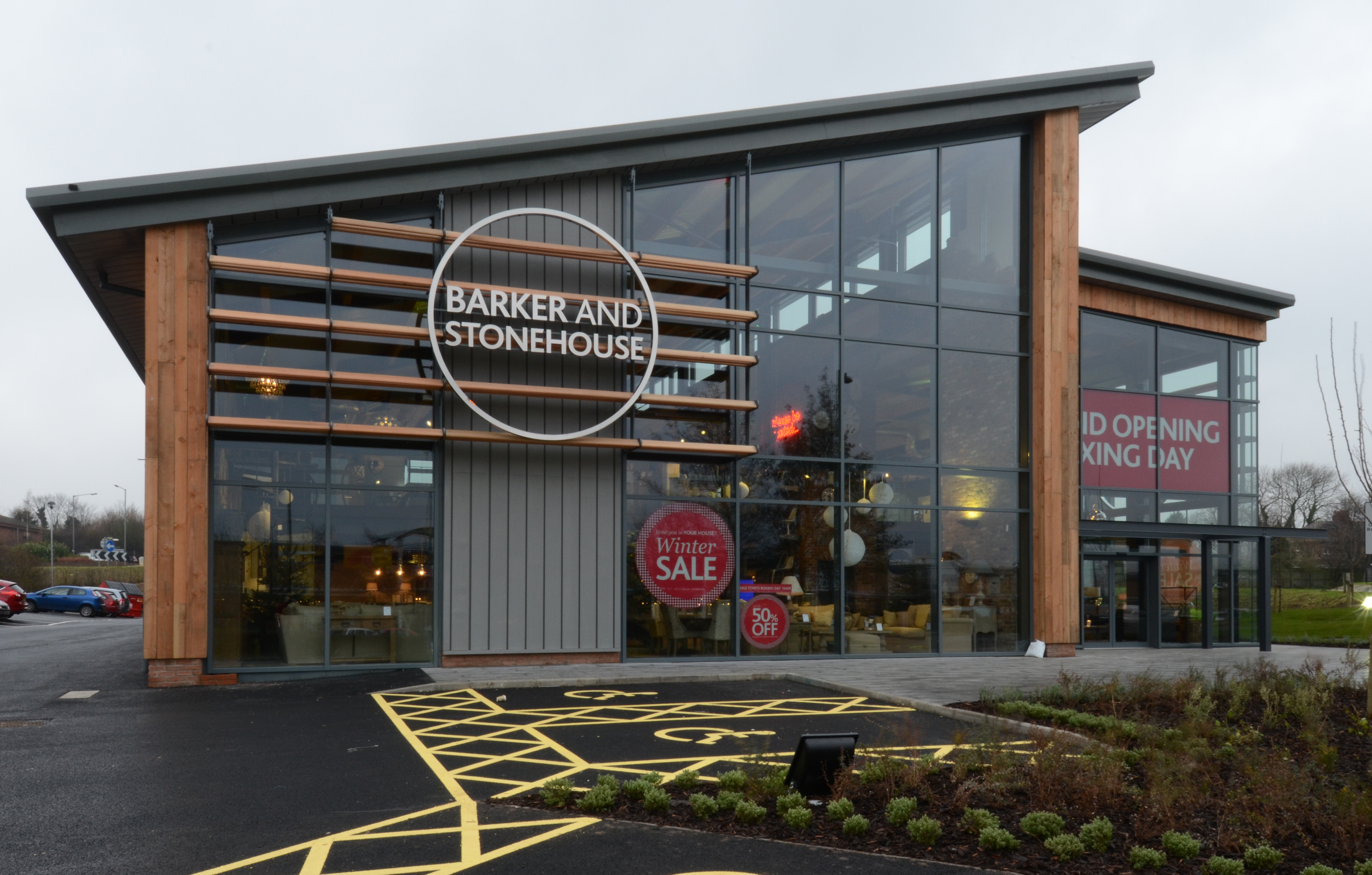
Barker and Stonehouse store in Knaresborough

Barker and Stonehouse Knaresborough opened in 2012. It features low energy heating, an energy-saving lighting system and a living roof garden for wildlife and insects. The store is also home to Stanley's Coffee House & Kitchen.

=== Hove ===
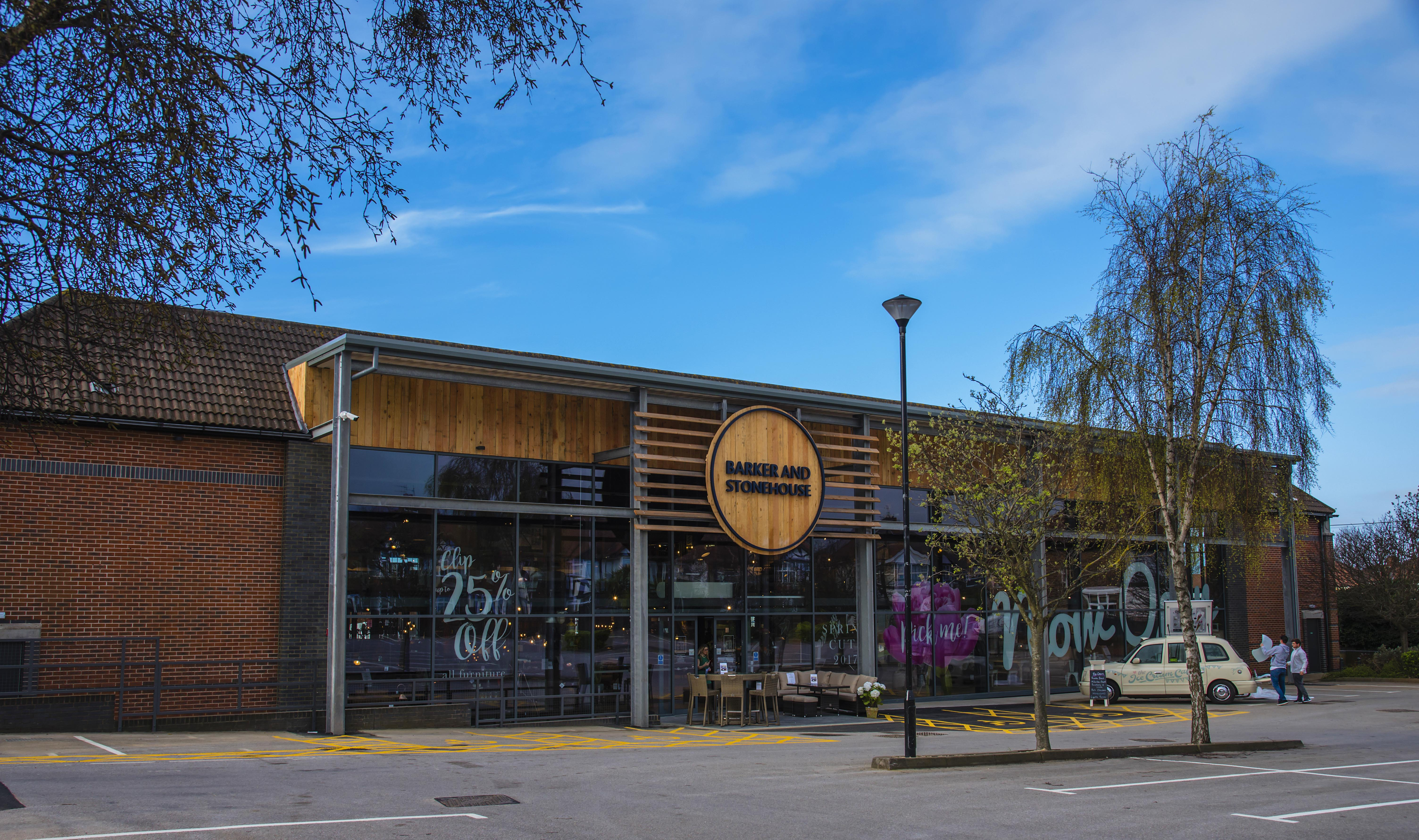
Barker and Stonehouse store in Hove

Located at 184–186 Old Shoreham Road, Barker and Stonehouse Hove opened in 2017 and is the largest furniture store on the south coast with 35,000 sq ft of retail space. The store was officially opened by TV's George Clarke.
