= Cabinets To Go =

American retail store chain

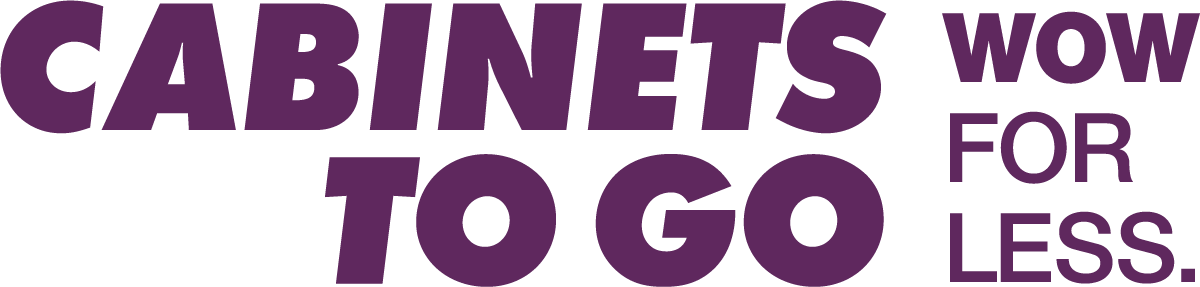
- Type: Private
- Industry: Furniture
- Founded: 2008
- Founder: Tom Sullivan
- Headquarters: Lawrenceburg, Tennessee
- Number of locations: 106 (April 2024)
- Revenue: ▲US$40.5 million (2022)
- Number of employees: 400 (2022)
- Website: cabinetstogo.com

Cabinets To Go is an American specialty cabinet retail store chain, offering cabinets for kitchens, bathrooms, laundry rooms, mudrooms, and garages. Founded in 2008 by Tom Sullivan, also founder of Lumber Liquidators. Cabinets To Go is headquartered in Lawrenceburg, Tennessee. The first store opened in Miami, Florida, and now operate 106 stores.

Over the years, Cabinets To Go has expanded to become a one-stop-shop for a variety of home remodeling products. Their stock includes wood-frame cabinets; quartz, granite, acrylic, Formica, and butcher block countertops; stainless-steel faucets and sinks; kitchen organizers; knobs and pulls; backsplashes; and LVT, and hardwood flooring.

== Appearances and Personalities ==
Cabinets To Go has been featured in a wide variety of television media, including interior design entertainment as well as game shows. Cabinets To Go products can be seen on SpikeTV’s Catch a Contractor (2015-2015), HGTV's Urban Oasis (2012-2013), Dream Home (2014-2020), Smart Home (2018-2019), Fantasy Kitchen (2018-2019), and Design Star; DIY Network’s Blog Cabin (2013-2015) and BATHTastic!; Game Show Network; TLC's Moving Up; and NextGen's (2015-2015) First to the Future Home.

Interior design personalities that are associated with Cabinets To Go include Ty Pennington and Alison Victoria, host of HGTV and DIY Network's Kitchen Crashers. Cabinets To Go also provided cabinetry for home bloggers Cassie Bustamante and Ciera Hudson.

== Charity Work ==
Cabinets To Go works with a number of charity organizations, including the Orange County Buddy Walk, Plan International USA, Best Buddies, Women in the World Foundation, and the Wounded Warrior Project.

in 2017, Cabinets To Go began sponsoring No Barriers USA, a non-profit organization that helps people with injuries and other disabilities overcome the obstacles and challenges in their lives.
