= Sarita Handa =

Indian furniture company

- Company type: Private
- Industry: Home & Furniture
- Founded: 1992
- Headquarters: Delhi, India
- Area served: India
- Key people: Sarita Handa (Founder)
- Products: Furniture, home décor
- Website: Official website

Sarita Handa is an Indian online marketplace for furniture and home décor. The company was founded in 1992 and headquartered in Delhi. The company started with a bank loan of INR 10 lakh from Canara Bank.

== History ==
Sarita Handa was founded by Sarita Handa in February 1992. In 2004, The company opened its first retail store in Delhi. Later, Handa opened 3 retail stores in Mumbai and Chennai.

== Awards ==
Sarita Handa invited to be part of Cannes Lions Festival, 2014, and joint winner of EDIDA's Award 2017 in bedroom category.
