= Scandinavian Design (store) =

Furniture retailer

Scandinavian Design Inc.
- Type: Private
- Industry: Trade
- Founded: 1955
- Headquarters: New York, NY
- Key people: Hans Lindblom Founder, CEO
- Products: Furniture

Scandinavian Design, Inc. was a furniture retailer located in New York City. It was founded in 1955 by Hans Lindblom and his wife Celia, who sold the work of their friend, Swedish designer Bruno Mathsson, under the name Bruno Mathsson Furniture. During the years more and more designs were added, and the store became Scandinavian Design, Inc., representing many designers and manufacturers from Denmark, Finland and Sweden. Original designers that were at times showcased by Scandinavian Design included Alvar Aalto, Arne Jacobsen, Poul Kjaerholm, Borge Mogensen and Hans J. Wegner. In 1987, Scandinavian Design filed for Chapter 11 bankruptcy protection and closed 25 of its 75 stores at the time.

The showroom was first located at East 53 Street in Manhattan. It was later moved to East 59th Street, where it was located until 1998, then moved to 347 Fifth Avenue.

The company closed its showroom in 2014.
