= Scan Furniture =

Defunct retailer of modern Scandinavian furniture

Scan Furniture was a co-operative furniture chain that operated six stores in the metropolitan Baltimore-Washington, D.C. area selling modern Scandinavian furniture.

Unusually, it was founded in 1938 as a grocery store in Greenbelt, Maryland, which became the Greenbelt Cooperative in 1940. The cooperative grew to include a gas station and furniture store. In 1984, the board of directors sold the grocery store and gas operations to concentrate on its Scan division. The grocery store remains a cooperative called the Greenbelt Consumers Cooperative.

In 1978 Scan Furniture was the largest teak importer in the country and imported about $10 million worth of teak every year. It was based in Rockville, Maryland, with a distribution center in Columbia.

On December 19, 2007, Scan filed for Chapter 11 bankruptcy protection, according to a report in the Baltimore Business Journal. Its sales dropped $25 million to $17 million from 2005 to 2007, according to court papers filed in the U.S. Bankruptcy Court in Baltimore. The retailer cited declining revenue and an inability to borrow money as factors in its filing. Scan officials stated that the decreased sales were partly due to "the decline in the housing market and the loss of business as a result of other furniture retailers ceasing operation and liquidating inventories at deep discounts."
