= Storehouse Furniture =

Storehouse Furniture was founded in Atlanta, Georgia, in 1969, and it quickly became an early style leader in well-designed, well-priced contemporary furnishings. In fact, it was Storehouse that brought many of today's best international manufacturers to the United States for the first time. Through company-owned stores and franchises, Storehouse soon spread across the Southeast and Texas, and then into the mid-Atlantic region.

In 1999, the company was acquired by Virginia-based Rowe Companies. In 2002, it was integrated with Rowe's Home Elements brand to create a stronger retail division of over 60 stores in 15 states. Storehouse has won the "Best Furniture Store" ARTS Award twice, and also won "Retailer of the Year" from Home Magazine in 2003.

On September 18, 2006, Rowe filed for Chapter 11 bankruptcy protection, and announced plans to sell Storehouse. Less than a month later, Hudson Capital Partners, was hired to liquidate Storehouse's inventory and then closed all Storehouse stores.

Private investment company Oak Point Partners acquired the remnant assets, consisting of any known and unknown assets that weren't previously administered, from the Storehouse, Inc. Bankruptcy Estate on June 17, 2011.
