= Milan Direct =

Australian furniture company

- Industry: Online Retail
- Founders: Dean Ramler
- Headquarters: Australia
- Areas served: Australia; United Kingdom; Europe
- Products: Housewares
- Owner: Temple & Webster
- Website: Milan Direct

Milan Direct was an Australian-based furniture company that is now sold as a private label under the Temple & Webster brand. The company was founded in 2006 and operates primarily through an online marketplace.

Milan Direct was bought by online retailer Temple & Webster in 2015 for $20 million, and is traded under TPW on the ASX.

== Overview ==
Milan Direct was founded in 2006 by Ruslan Kogan and Dean Ramler. Previously, Kogan had launched an online electronics retail business, and Ramler's family has had a history of furniture design and production. The company sells both modern and retro furniture and uses a direct to consumer distribution method.

By 2010, the company had a revenue of $5.3 million and was named to the BRW Fast Starters list. In 2011, Milan Direct generated $6.7 million in revenue and $12.6 million in 2012.

== Acquisition ==
In November 2015, Temple & Webster acquired Milan Direct ahead of its IPO. In 2016, Milan Direct opened its first brick and mortar retail location in Richmond, Victoria. In December 2016, Temple & Webster absorbed Milan Direct, shut down its website and began selling its products from the Temple & Webster website as a private collection.

== See also ==
- Nick Scali Furniture
