= Wholesale Furniture Brokers =

WFB Wholesale Furniture Brokers Group Inc.
- Company type: Private
- Industry: E-commerce
- Founded: 2002
- Headquarters: Kamloops, Canada
- Key people: Sergei Tashlikowich; CEO & President
- Products: Home Furniture, Bedroom Furniture, Children's Furniture, Dining Room Furniture, Living Room Furniture, Mattresses, Outdoor Furniture, etc.
- Revenue: Over 5 Million Annually
- Number of employees: 14 (2019)
- Website: www.GoWFB.ca www.GoWFB.com; Kamloops.WholesaleFurnitureBrokers.ca; B2B.WholesaleFurnitureBrokers.com

WFB Wholesale Furniture Brokers Group Inc. is a privately held Canadian Corporation which is predominantly an online retailer headquartered in Kamloops, British Columbia, Canada. Wholesale Furniture Brokers is ranked within the top 500 of Canada's fastest-growing companies, ranked by five-year revenue growth as scored by Profit 500 in 2013.

== History ==
Wholesale Furniture Brokers started in July 2000 as a warehouse mattress outlet in Austin, TX under the name Zirnhelt Wholesale. It was named after its founder, Canadian businessman Dave Zirnhelt. After a successful first year, he renamed the business to Wholesale Furniture Brokers to improve its marketability. Upon returning to Kamloops, British Columbia, Canada in June 2002, Zirnhelt recruited Sergei Tashlikowich, a fellow graduate of the Bachelor of Business Administration program at the University College of the Cariboo, now known as Thompson Rivers University. In August 2002, Zirnhelt and Tashlikowich founded a new Canadian company by the same name to operate the online version of Wholesale Furniture Brokers.

When GoWFB.com was launched in 2003, Wholesale Furniture Brokers recruited independently owned furniture stores to become affiliates that would perform fulfillment and share in sales generated by the site. As delivery options improved, Wholesale Furniture Brokers decreased the involvement of local stores in favor of local delivery agents and direct shipping to the customer.

== Timeline ==
The first 300 square foot Kamloops warehouse outlet opened in the Spring of 2004.

In February 2008, Wholesale Furniture Brokers moved their headquarters to their current location at 103 - 1366 Hugh Allan Drive, Kamloops, British Columbia and opened their first factory outlet store.

Wholesale Furniture Brokers became incorporated as WFB Wholesale Furniture Brokers Group Inc. in June 2008.

Wholesale Furniture Brokers became a trademark of Wholesale Furniture Brokers in September 2009. The trademark was registered with the Canadian Intellectual Property Office.

The company discontinued their affiliate program in October 2009. The move was made to simplify the fulfillment process and protect the brand's image.

Wholesale Furniture Brokers hired an outside agency, Convert Marketing to redesign its websites and launched an updated version in January 2010.

Wholesale Furniture Brokers opened their 9,500 square foot Langley, British Columbia distribution centre in August 2012.

In September 2013, Tashlikowich acquired Zirnhelt's shares to become the sole owner of Wholesale Furniture Brokers.

Wholesale Furniture Brokers removed restocking fees from returns and exchanges policy on Canadian website in April, 2014.

== Rankings ==
2013 - Wholesale Furniture Brokers ranked 421 in Profit 500's Top 500 of Canada's fastest-growing companies, ranked by five-year revenue for 2013.

2013 - Wholesale Furniture Brokers ranked 17 of 21 companies in the retail category in Profit 500's Top 500 of Canada's fastest-growing companies, ranked by five-year revenue for 2013.

2013 - Wholesale Furniture Brokers was nominated for the Premier's People's Choice Award for the Small Business BC Awards in 2013.
