= Art Van Furniture =

Defunct American furniture retailer

Art Van Furniture Inc.
- Type: Private
- Industry: Retail
- Genre: Furniture
- Founded: 1959; 67 years ago in Eastpointe, Michigan
- Founder: Archie "Art" Van Elslander
- Defunct: March 5, 2020; 6 years ago
- Fate: Chapter 7 bankruptcy; Liquidation
- Headquarters: Warren, Michigan, U.S.
- Products: Furniture
- Number of employees: 3,700
- Website: www.artvan.com

Art Van Furniture Inc. was an American furniture retail store chain, with stores across the Midwestern United States. Founded in 1959, the company was headquartered in Warren, Michigan, and claimed to be the largest furniture retailer in the Midwest at its peak. In 2020, the company filed for bankruptcy and closed all of its stores.

== History ==
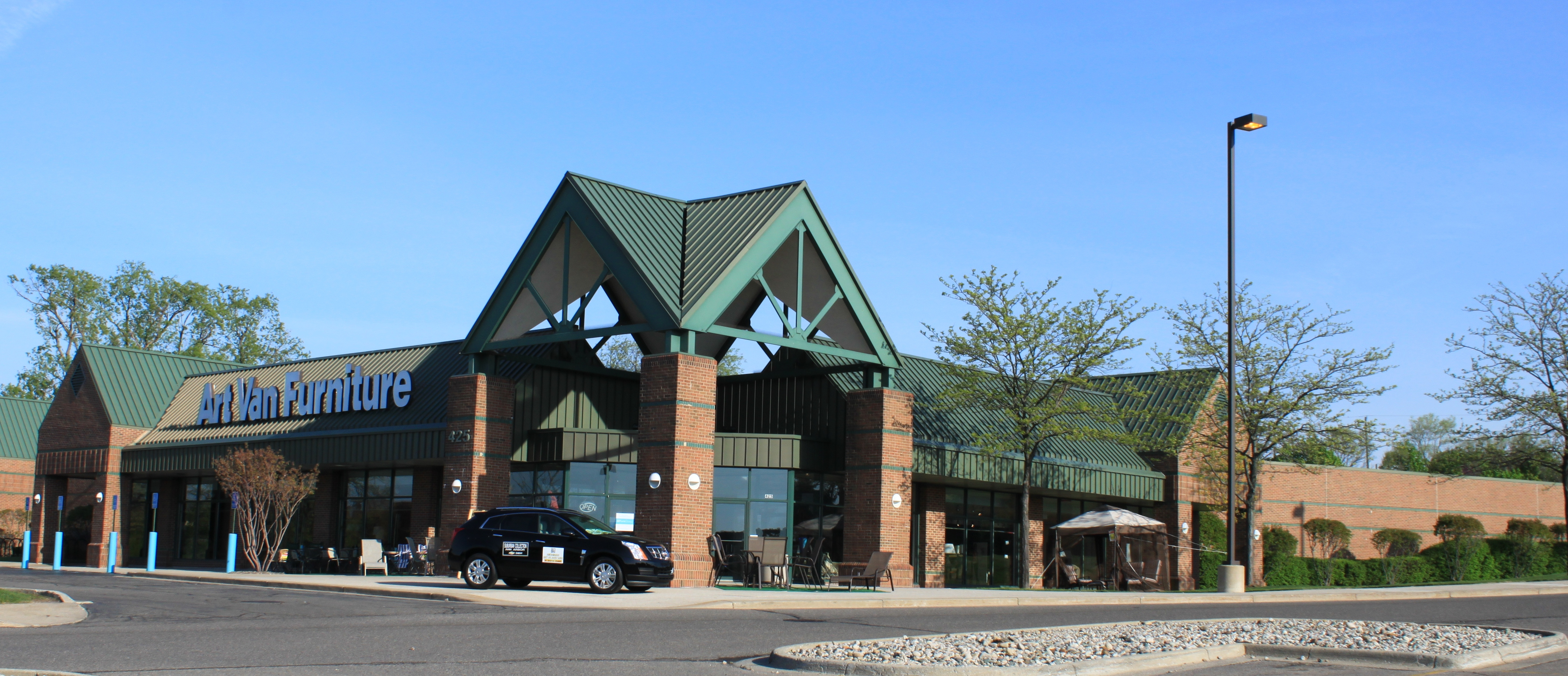
Art Van Furniture store, Ann Arbor, MI, 2010

Archie "Art" Van Elslander founded Art Van in 1959, opening his first store in a 4,000 square-foot space at 10 Mile Road and Gratiot Avenue in East Detroit. He expanded to three stores in that same year, and a fourth store opened in 1960. His first employee was not hired until this time. Art Vans Furniture, as it was then known, opened with mostly modern and Danish-style furniture.

By 1963, Van Elslander owned seven stores and had taken on some partners, including his brother, Bob Van Elslander, Don Fox and Bob McEachin. The following year, three of those stores were sold off, however Van Elslander expanded the chain in the 1970s and in 1973 the company purchased its headquarters in Warren, Michigan. Around that time, the company had fifteen stores in its chain. In the late 1970s, the company opened several warehouses and a corporate training department. In 1977, the company opened stores outside of the Detroit area, in Flint and Lansing, Michigan.

In 1980, the company issued its first credit card, and in 1985 the company opened clearance centers attached to many of their stores, offering overstocked merchandise at a discount.

=== Acquisitions & expansion beyond Michigan ===
In 2009, Art Van introduced PureSleep, a brand of in-store departments and standalone stores offering mattresses. A year later in 2010, the company acquired Brewbaker's Furniture, and converted its two stores in northern Michigan into Art Van locations.

Art Van acquired Howell, Michigan-based Mattress World in 2011, converting many of that chain's locations to PureSleep stores.

Art Van expanded outside Michigan for the first time in July 2013, with a new store in Orland Park, Illinois. Later that year, the chain also entered Ohio, opening a store near Toledo in September.

The company expanded into Iowa in 2016, with franchised stores in Cedar Falls and Coralville.

In March 2017, Art Van was acquired by private equity firm Thomas H. Lee Partners (THL) for $617 million (~$774 million in 2024). Later that year, the company acquired Pennsylvania-based chains Levin Furniture and Wolf Furniture.

Art Van expanded into Missouri in 2018, with four franchised stores in the St. Louis area. These were former locations of Rothman's Furniture, a local chain that went out of business in early 2017.

The chain opened its flagship store in Canton, Michigan on February 1, 2018.

=== Bankruptcy ===
On March 5, 2020, Art Van announced the closure of all of its company-owned stores, and filed for Chapter 11 bankruptcy four days later. During the liquidation sale, a store in Warren, Michigan dealt with massive, unruly crowds, and was ordered by police to close early. The timing of the company's bankruptcy meant liquidation sales were cut short due to the COVID-19 pandemic, and the case was converted to Chapter 7 bankruptcy by April.

Levin Furniture's stores were reacquired by former owner Robert Levin during bankruptcy proceedings, and were reopened under his ownership later in 2020. After the closure, THL initially reneged on its promise of severance pay, which led to former employees taking action and lobbying THL investors to force the company to create a 'Hardship Fund' for former employees.

== Loves Furniture & Mattresses ==
Loves Furniture & Mattresses
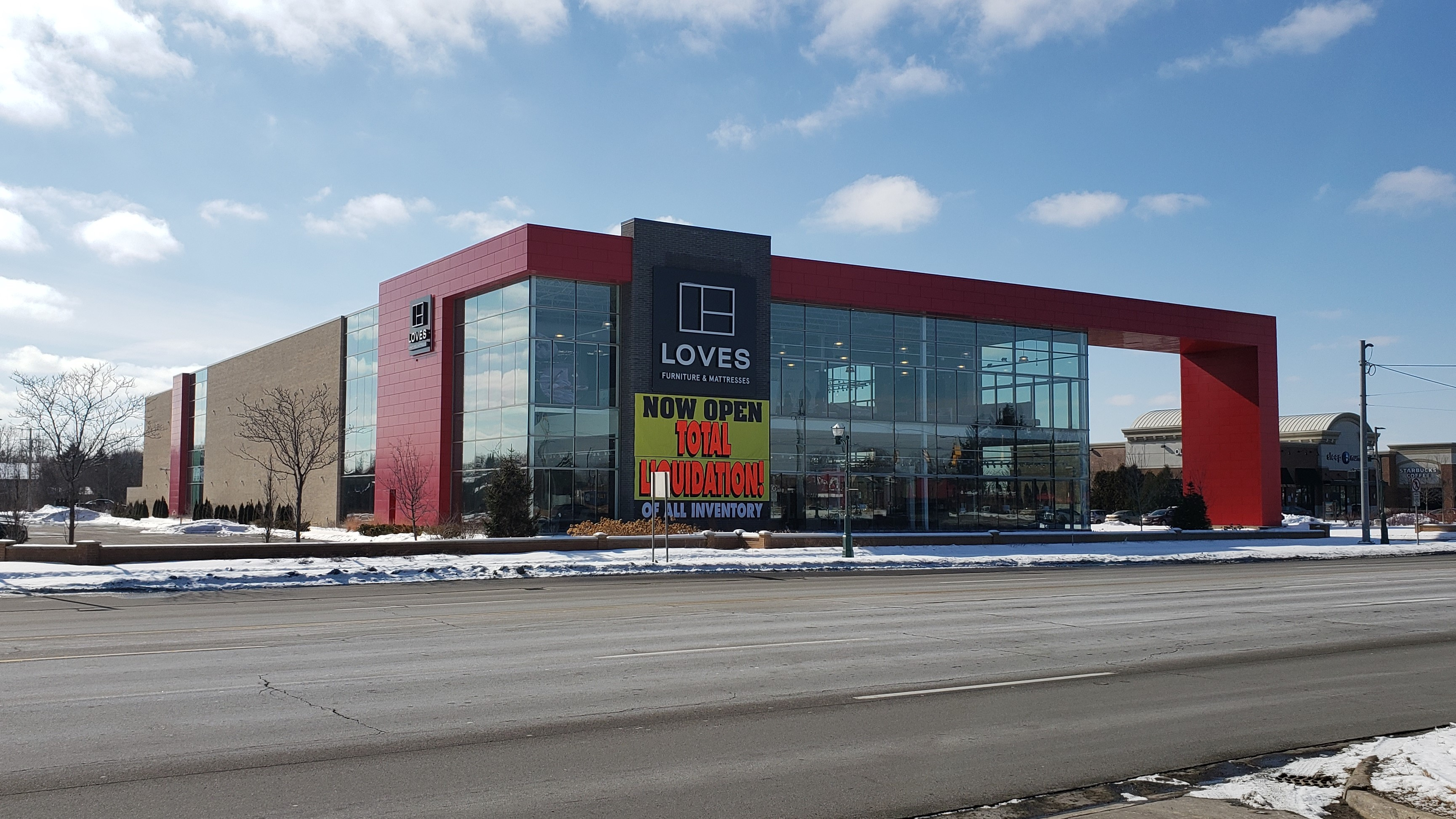
- Loves Furniture flagship store, Canton, Michigan (July 2021)
- Type: Private
- Industry: Furniture retail
- Founded: May 2020; 6 years ago
- Defunct: July 27, 2021; 5 years ago
- Fate: Chapter 11 bankruptcy
- Headquarters: Warren, Michigan, U.S.
- Number of locations: 27 (2020)
- Products: Furniture
- Website: www.artvan.com

In May 2020, 24 Art Van stores and three Wolf stores were acquired by Texas-based private equity firm U.S. Assets, and reopened later that year under the name Loves Furniture & Mattresses, named after U.S. Assets founder and CEO Jeff Love.

In December 2020, Loves announced the closure of 13 locations, and sold three Pennsylvania stores to Levin Furniture. By January 2021, Loves had filed for Chapter 11 bankruptcy, and announced that all of its stores would close permanently. The last Loves stores closed on July 27, 2021.

Most former Art Van and Loves locations are now occupied by other furniture retailers. Gardner-White, the chain's largest competitor in Metro Detroit, acquired Art Van's former headquarters, plus the flagship store in Canton. Many others became Value City Furniture stores, allowing that chain to expand their presence in the Detroit area.

== Stores ==
At its peak, the company operated 141 stores located in Michigan, Ohio, Illinois, Indiana, Iowa, and Missouri and a full service e-commerce website. The company also had franchised stores located in the Midwest. In all, the company had nearly 200 stores. Art Van also produced a mail catalog of its furniture offerings.

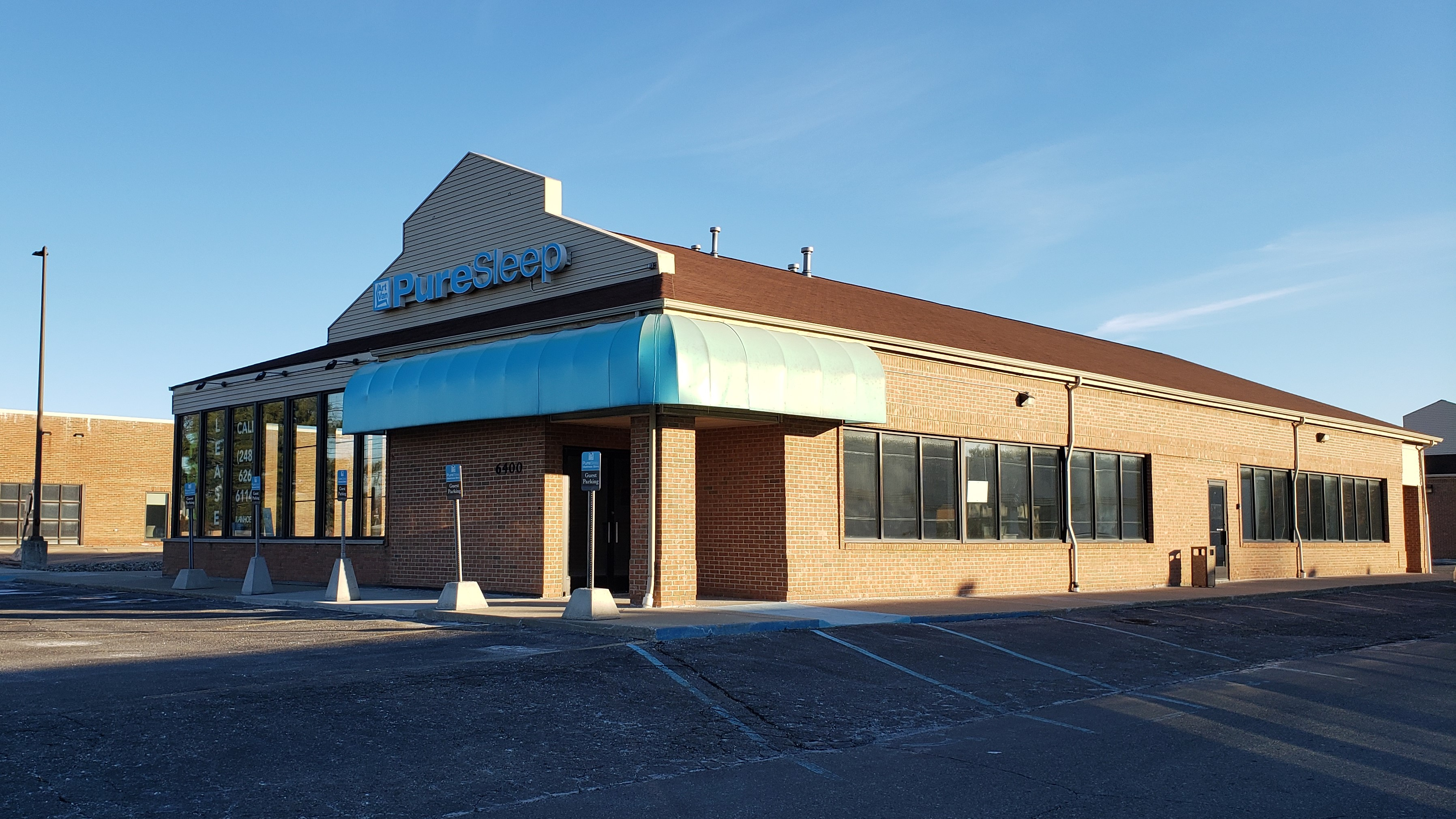
Vacant Art Van PureSleep store, Warren, MI, 2021

=== PureSleep ===
PureSleep was a brand used for the mattress departments in Art Van stores, as well as standalone small-format mattress stores. The first PureSleep store opened in Canton, Michigan in July 2009, and by 2020, there were 60 PureSleep stores, plus a PureSleep department in every full-line Art Van location.

As part of Art Van's bankruptcy filing, all remaining standalone PureSleep locations closed permanently on March 16, 2020.

=== Scott Shuptrine ===
Scott Shuptrine was a small chain of high-end furniture stores located primarily in Metro Detroit, acquired by the Van Elslander family in 1986. The chain had two stores in Metro Detroit, and a third in Petoskey, when it was shut down by Art Van in October 2002.

The brand was brought back in 2010 as Scott Shuptrine Interiors, a store-within-a-store in select Art Van locations. The company also opened one standalone Scott Shuptrine Interiors store, in Grosse Pointe, Michigan, in 2015. All of these closed in 2020.

=== Paul's TV ===
Art Van partnered with California-based electronics retailer Paul's TV in 2010 to open store-within-a-store locations in select Art Van stores. Eighteen locations were opened, however all were closed down by 2015.

== Marketing ==
In 2015, the company paid out $2.5 million (~$3.22 million in 2024) dollars in free furniture to 3000 customers after a promotion that gave away the purchases of customers if it snowed three inches each in the cities of Toledo, Fort Wayne, and Chicago. In 2016, Art Van replaced its regional Super Bowl advertisements in the Detroit and Grand Rapids areas with a thank you message for donors of water to Flint, Michigan, which the company had solicited through its charitable programs.

== See also ==
- Retail apocalypse
- List of retailers affected by the retail apocalypse
