= Great Little Trading Co =

English online children's retailer

Great Little Trading Co.
- Type: Private Limited Company
- Industry: Retail
- Founded: 1997
- Area served: Worldwide
- Key people: Tracy Thomas (Managing Director)
- Products: Toy Storage; Children's Furniture; Beds; Mattresses; Bedding; Room Accessories; Toys; Gifts
- Revenue: £13,000,000
- Number of employees: 13

The Great Little Trading Company (GLTC) is an English online children's retailer that specializes in children's furniture, room accessories, and toys.

== History ==
GLTC was founded in 1997 by two American women living in London and is now owned by Baaj Capital.

GLTC helps parents to create and organize homes for their families and is an online company that delivers to locations all over the world.

== Products ==
Their range of children's toys is designed for children aged 2–10 years old.

== Awards ==
GLTC have won a number of awards for their children's furniture, toys, gifts and customer service.

The Great Little Trading Co has won the Best Children's Retailer at the ECMOD awards for the past three years in 2012, 2013 and 2014. Below is a list of some of the awards they have won:

- 2015 Best Pre-School Toy Category (Silver: Cavendish Kitchen), Prima Baby Awards
- 2014 Best Online Retailer Baby & Me Magazine
- 2014 Best Wooden Toy 3-6yrs (Gold: Tea Trolley), Loved By Parents Awards
- 2013 Best Toy Design (Gold: Carnival Playhouse), Loved By Parents Awards
- 2013 Best Online Gift Retailer (Shortlisted) Junior Magazine Awards
- 2012 Best Children's Bedrooms (Online Shopping Award, Mother & Child Category), Sheerluxe.com
- 2012 Best Children's Retailer (Commendation), Junior Magazine
