= Peter Green Furnishers =

Furniture shop in Hampshire, England

- Type: Private company
- Industry: Retail
- Founded: 1956 in Eastleigh
- Founder: Peter Green and Norah Green
- Defunct: May 24, 2024
- Fate: Insolvent
- Headquarters: Chandler's Ford, Hampshire, United Kingdom
- Area served: South of England
- Key people: Wendy Martin Green (CEO)
- Products: Furniture
- Owner: Green family
- Website: www.petergreen.co.uk

Peter Green Furnishers was a British furniture business that operated from Chandler's Ford in Hampshire and operated three large stores and an online furniture retail operation.

The company was founded by Peter Green and his wife in 1956 in a small shop at 43 Leigh Road. He may have had only £150 capital, but he had years of experience as a sales representative in the furniture trade. The company expanded through the next decades and built a close connection with the local community. When Peter died suddenly in 1980 the firm management moved to his wife Norah. When she died in 2010, the furniture business was passed on to their only daughter Wendy Martin Green who continued to run and expand the business.

Online competition and the recovery from the Covid-19 pandemic in 2020 was difficult for the business. It had been operating for 68 years before it became insolvent and closed in 2024.

== History ==
Peter Green (1916–1980) started his furniture business in Eastleigh with his wife Norah and child in arms when he was forty years old in 1956.

Green had been in the business all his working life apart from a period spent flying during the second world war. His family had been in the furniture trade for generations, his grandfather having dealt in antique furniture a century earlier. Green had grown up in Nuneaton and was proud to be an Old Edwardian having attended King Edward’s Grammar School in Nuneaton.

Green chose Eastleigh because he felt at ease in a railway town, having grown up in Nuneaton, which was also a similar sized town. At first Peter sold beds in the daytime and delivered them in the evening, with his wife Norah acting as secretary and doing all the office work. He then added other furniture to his stock before later opening a small carpet shop at 54 High Street. The business grew steadily from these tiny beginnings until in 1966, with three branches. Green, helped by his brother Reg as sales director, took a corner of huge premises in Southampton Road then occupied by the Fair Oak Dairy Company, and which had formerly been a brush factory. In Green’s first "Walk Around Showrooms" carpets and furniture were crammed into one building, the Mayor of Eastleigh came to open this important new store and the business grew steadily.

=== Southampton Road location ===
The premises had a fascinating history as part of the town. The building had been erected in 1873 by the side of the London to Southampton railway line. At that time Eastleigh had not yet come into existence, amounting to little more than 90 houses, and the building housed the Bishopstoke Brewery. During the course of the two world wars, and by then occupied by the Fair Oak Dairy Company, the building played an important part in supplying dairy produce to military camps and installations over a wide area of Southern Command.

The Bishopstoke Brewery had leased the quarter acre site for 100 years but over the next few years the brewery changed hands several times. After several changes of ownership the premises ceased to be used as a brewery. In 1886 at a cost of £6,000 they were converted into a dog biscuit factory run by Dear & Co, a Millbrook firm. From 1889 however the premises lay empty until another biscuit manufacturer took the premises for a couple more years until 1895 following which the building served as a temporary school house used by the Eastleigh School Board.

In the next few years the premises were also used by a dairy followed by a gear and engineering works.

The longest period of occupation was from 1914 until 1966 after the building passed into the hands of the Fair Oak Dairy Produce Company owned by a London-based wholesale grocery company, managed by Mr. Johnson who also farmed at Foxhole Farm, Allington Lane, Fair Oak from where much of the dairy’s milk came.

=== Expansion ===
Gradually, after 1966, Green’s firm expanded into other parts of the building as they became vacant until, by 1973, the firm owned the entire freehold and was established as a pioneer of huge furniture and carpet showrooms with hundreds of rolls of broadloom carpet and vinyl, dozens of three piece suites, scores of beds, range after range of bedroom and dining room furniture and many pieces of occasional furniture. Later a special shop for curtains and dress fabrics was opened in the High Street.

The whole building covered 20,000 square feet. The hall of 5,000 square feet taken over in 1966 would be used exclusively as a carpet showroom whilst the remaining 15,000 square feet would be used to display a huge collection of furniture in addition to a warehouse and workrooms.

Besides offering a huge selection Peter Green was unusual in that he offered a complete service as well as keen prices. He could afford to give both owing to his low overheads as he owned the freehold and so avoided the high rents which had to be paid by similar stores and passed on to the customer.

From the very start, Peter Green was involved in the life of the town; he did charitable work—a lot of that amongst the elderly, disabled, and those down on their luck. Peter was made the first—and so far only—non-political Freeman of the Borough for his contribution to the business and the charitable life of the community.

In the mid 1970s Peter decided to improve his premises by stages. He began by planning a well designed showroom on the corner facing the town centre. Planning permission for this was granted in 1976 and building was about to commence when the town centre plan was introduced which stopped him from building.

Peter Green was fond of Eastleigh. He saw it as a friendly red-brick town of character. He had created the largest non-food retail enterprise and was keen to see other durable stores come. He was also keen to see Eastleigh preserve its character and remain different from other towns. He had always advanced cautiously without borrowing huge sums and argued that the town should grow in the same way.

When Peter Green died suddenly in 1980 his wife Norah became company chairman and Tim Maguire who joined the firm in 1972 became managing director.

The company came through the recession which followed and by 1982 turnover had increased by a third, a sure sign that customers still liked the selection and trading methods at the company’s unique showrooms. Many changes were made; fitted kitchens and fitted bedrooms became big business and there was a thriving contract department which eventually served customers as far away as the Falkland Islands and Gambia.

From small beginnings Peter Green had become one of the largest independent household furnishers in the South of England. Turnover has risen 40 times since the move to Southampton Road but the old fashioned friendly service had remained unaltered.

=== Chandlers Ford location ===
Plans had been announced in 1976 for an extensive covered shopping centre in Eastleigh. The Peter Green site was demanded by the council for the scheme but it was not viable for such a large business to operate from a shopping centre. At last, after eight years of uncertainty, a suitable building was found for the move. It was situated in School Lane, Chandlers Ford, a short distance from the old site and just off the main Bournemouth Road.

In 1985 came the move from its long established base in Southampton Road and the grand opening of a giant new store in School Lane, Chandlers Ford presided over by chairman, Norah Green and managing director, Tim Maguire. The new premises were formerly owned by W H O’Gorman and were ideal as they offered a total floor area of 33,000 square feet and parking for 100 cars. The newly refurbished premises were easy to reach from all directions. Edge of town trading had many advantages at a time when it was becoming more and more common in Europe and the US to move stores away from town centres. Easy access and parking, lower overheads which lead to lower prices and better service were all things that Peter Green had believed in and built his business on.

A noted feature of the new premises was the "Carousel" – a coffee bar located in the centre of the showroom; like that at the previous store it soon became the meeting place for regular customers.

Over 100 local families came to depend upon the family business for a living. The staff would form a team that grew over the years. They served the whole of Wessex from the Borough of Eastleigh for decades.

Local footballer Manny Andruszewski worked for a time at the Chandler's Ford store.

=== Further expansion ===
The company celebrated its 40 years in business in 1996 with a complete refurbishment of its Chandlers Ford store and also by opening a huge new store in Basingstoke.

In the 2003 a further store was opened in Reading, and the company was the largest independent furniture retailer in the region.

On 8 January 2010, Norah Green died, peacefully at home, bringing the original partnership to a close. In 2011 the 'child in arms' at the opening of the first store, returned to the business and Wendy Martin, sole offspring of Peter and Norah became a Director of Peter Green.

In 2010 a design studio was opened in the Reading store.

In 2016 the Peter Green store commemorated 60 years of trading in Eastleigh. Events included an exhibition in Eastleigh Museum and participation in Borough celebrations.

=== Closure and end ===
After several attempts to sell the business as a going concern, on May 25, 2024, the Peter Green store in Chandler's Ford closed without warning. A notice was posted on the door reading: "Closed until further notice. We apologise for the inconvenience."

== Recognition ==
- Peter Green was given the Freedom of the Borough of Eastleigh in 1977.
- Furniture Retailer of the Year for 2009
