= ILVA =

Danish furniture store chain

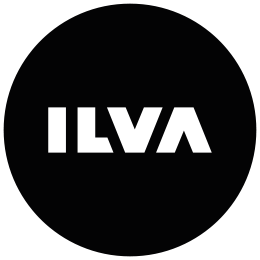
- Type: Private
- Industry: Retail
- Founded: Ishøj, Denmark (1974)
- Area served: Northern Europe
- Products: Furniture
- Owner: IDdesign
- Website: ilva.dk

ILVA is a Danish chain of furniture stores, offering mostly Scandinavian-style bed-, dining- and living room products. The company was founded in 1974, and currently runs eight stores in the Nordic countries. It also had three stores in Britain for about two years, but these were forced to close down during the 2008 financial crisis.

The internationalisation of ILVA reverses the common trend of retail internationalisation offered by literature. ILVA, rather than making acquisitions of other stores, was acquired by Martin Toogood in 2003, with a view to internationalise into the UK. Martin Toogood believed that there was a gap in the UK middle market of furniture retailing.

== History ==
Ilva's old logo

The company started when Jorgen and Inger Linde opened a 10,000 m² warehouse south of Copenhagen in 1974 under the name of JL Møbler og Tæpper A/S . Three years later, it was renamed ILVA.

ILVA opened its first United Kingdom store in 2006. It planned to open stores close to existing IKEA stores in order to boost their customer base.

In July 2007 the Daily Telegraph reported that the company had run up losses of £11.5 million.

The store was sold to the Icelandic retail group Rúmfatalagerinn in August 2007, but losses continued to mount as the company was losing £2.33 for every £1 taken.

In March and April 2008 their Manchester store was attacked by criminals firing ball bearings at the windows. There were two separate attacks which cost the business £10,000 due to the size of the windows which had been attacked.

On 25 June 2008, ILVA placed its UK business into administration. On 18 July 2008 the joint administrators announced that they had been unable to secure a buyer for the business after an interested party withdrew at the last minute and that all three stores would close over the following six to twelve weeks. A closing down sale started immediately to sell as much stock as possible. Recovery specialists Kroll brought the closing date forward as stock reduced. ILVA closed in the UK on Sunday 7 September 2008.

In February 2009 the Danish company IDdesign, who also owns the furniture chain IDEmøbler, bought ILVA with the objective to establish the leading furniture chain in Scandinavia. ILVA and IDEmøbler will continue as individual brands with individual management teams.

In March 2010 ILVA in Denmark opened a fourth furniture house, in Kolding, Jutland. Despite turbulent years, ILVA in Denmark remains a trend setting, major player in Danish furniture retail.

== Operations ==
The company opened its first overseas store in Malmö, Sweden, in 2005, and in 2006 it opened three UK stores (in Manchester, Thurrock and Gateshead). Their first store in Iceland opened on 4 October 2008 in Reykjavík.

Country	Opening year	Number
Denmark	1974	43
Sweden	2005	5
United Kingdom	2006	None as of 2008
Iceland	2008	3

== See also ==
- IDEmøbler
