= Levin Furniture =

American furniture retailer

Levin Furniture Company
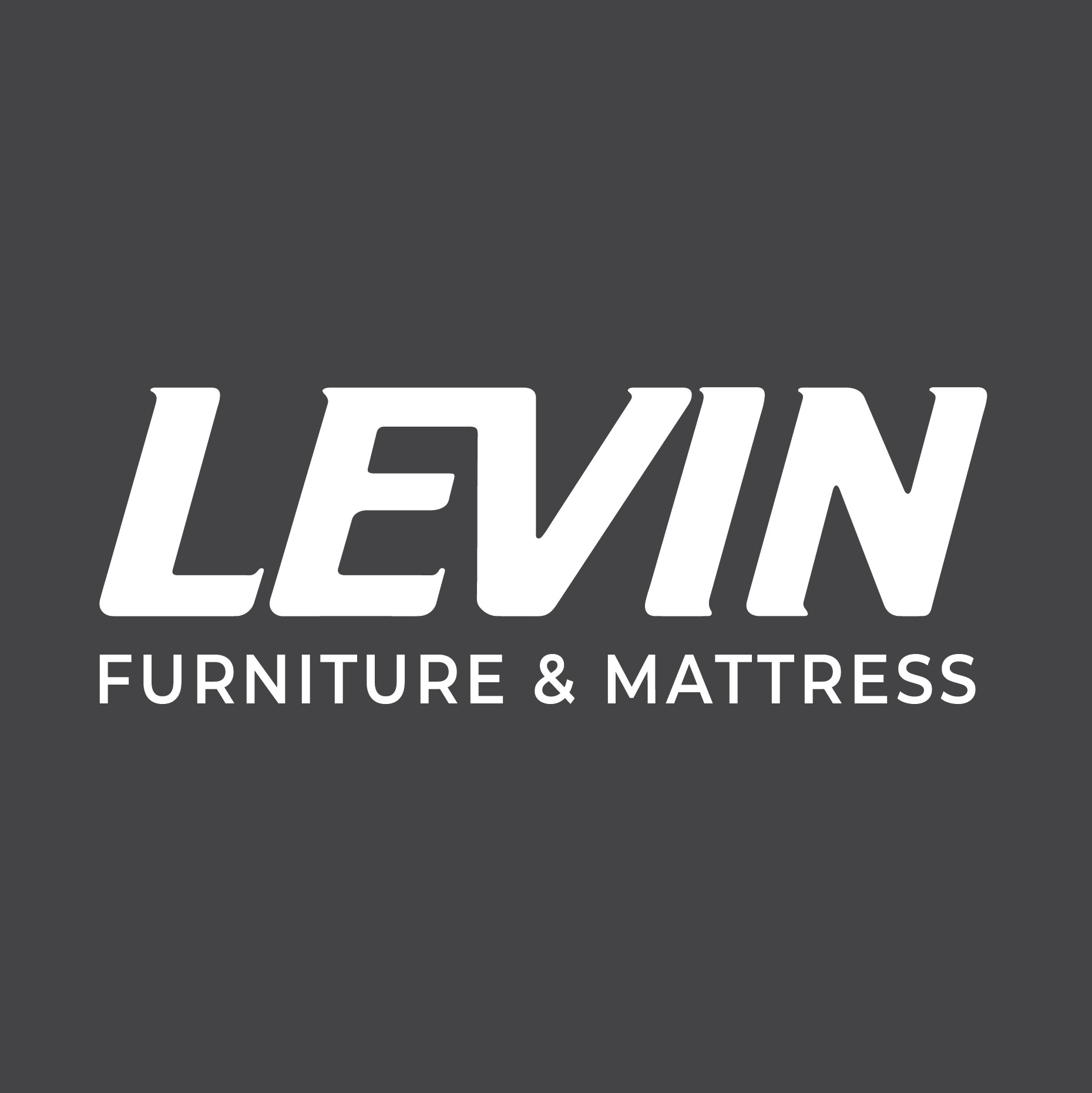
- Trade name: Levin Furniture & Mattress
- Company type: Private
- Industry: Furniture retail
- Founded: 1920; 106 years ago (as Sam Levin Furniture Company)
- Founders: Sam Levin; Jessie Levin
- Headquarters: Mount Pleasant, Pennsylvania
- Number of locations: 28
- Key people: Robert Levin (President)
- Products: Furniture, Mattresses
- Revenue: ▲US$120 million (2021)
- Number of employees: 1,000 (2021)

Levin Furniture is a furniture and mattress retailer with 28 stores in Pennsylvania and Ohio.

== History ==
The company was founded in 1920 by Sam and Jessie Levin in Mount Pleasant, Pennsylvania as a general sales clearance center. In the 1940s, the Levin family phased out other items in order to concentrate on furniture. Leonard Levin, son of Sam and Jessie, joined the company during this time and eventually became president. Between 1978 and 1985, the company added five new stores in the Pittsburgh, Pennsylvania area. In 1989, Howard Levin became president following the death of his father Leonard. In 1992, the company expanded its operations into the Cleveland, Ohio market. Shortly after, Robert Levin became president of the company.

In 2017, Robert Levin retired and Levin Furniture was acquired by Art Van Furniture of Warren, Michigan. In 2020, Art Van Furniture filed for Chapter 11 bankruptcy with plans to liquidate all company-owned stores. After Art Van went into Chapter 7 bankruptcy liquidation in April, former Levin Furniture owner Robert Levin stepped in soon after and signed a deal to buy back the Levin Furniture stores to save them from potential closures in 2020. In addition to buying back his own stores, Levin also acquired two former Wolf Furniture stores in central Pennsylvania that were impacted by the Art Van bankruptcy. This brought the total number of Levin stores to 28.
