= One Workplace =

Commercial office furniture dealership in Northern California

One Workplace is a commercial workplace performance provider on the West Coast. It is headquartered in Santa Clara, California and has regional offices in Oakland, California, San Francisco, California, Sacramento, California, Salinas, California, Seattle, Washington, and Spokane, Washington. One Workplace sells office furniture, audiovisual systems, decor, architectural products, and experiential design. In addition, it offers workplace and culture consulting, hospitality services, and project management services, including moves/add/changes and workspace decommissioning. It is a privately held company.

== History ==
One Workplace opened in 1925 in downtown San Jose, California as a family-owned bookstore. Its original name was Lindsay’s. Soon the company began to sell office supplies. When the Ferrari family purchased partial ownership, its name became Lindsay Ferrari and the company transitioned to selling office furniture. The Ferrari’s acquired complete ownership of Lindsay Ferrari and the company’s name became One Workplace.

One Workplace works with several vertical markets, including education, healthcare, corporate offices, government, bioscience, senior living, and small businesses. In November 2008, the company launched two separate divisions: Synergy 4 Health (today known as One Workplace Healthcare) and Architectural Environments.
