= IDEmøbler =

Danish chain of furniture stores

- Founded: 1969
- Headquarters: Denmark
- Area served: Europe, Middle East
- Website: ide.dk

ILVA logo

IDEmøbler is a Danish chain of furniture stores, founded in 1969. In some countries, it is known by the name of its holding company IDesign. The company runs over 30 stores in Denmark and has subsidiaries and affiliates in the Nordic countries and the Middle East. For a long time, IDEmøbler's parent company was called IDdesign A/S, which in addition to IDEmøbler operated ILVA in Denmark and Sweden, as well as IDdesign in Europe and the Middle East. In 2019, the chain was merged with ILVA.

== See also ==
- ILVA
