= Artemano Canada =

Artemano is a Canadian home furnishing company that was founded in October 2002. They are headquartered in Longueuil, Quebec, where their warehouse & distribution centre is located. Artemano Canada sells its merchandise through its retail branches on Le Corbusier street in Laval, the DIX30 lifestyle centre in Brossard, on St. Joseph Blvd. in Quebec City, in Toronto, Ontario, in Ottawa, Ontario and in Longueuil, Quebec.
