= Move Loot =

Company in California

- Type: Private
- Industry: E-commerce, Furniture, Retail
- Founded: 2013
- Founders: Bill Bobbitt (CEO); Jenny Morrill (CMO); Ryan Smith (CTO) and Shruti Shah (COO)
- Defunct: July 2016
- Headquarters: San Francisco, CA
- Areas served: San Francisco Bay Area; Raleigh-Durham, NC; Charlotte, NC; Atlanta, GA; New York, NY; Los Angeles, CA

Move Loot was a company and online marketplace for the buying and selling of secondhand (used) furniture. Move Loot was headquartered in San Francisco, CA and served the following markets: San Francisco Bay Area, New York, New York, Los Angeles, California, Raleigh, North Carolina, Durham, North Carolina, Charlotte, North Carolina and Atlanta, Georgia.

== History ==
Move Loot was founded by Bill Bobbitt (CEO), Jenny Morrill (CMO), Ryan Smith (CTO), and Shruti Shah (COO) in 2013. By October 2015, the service had 12 partnering retailers, 150 movers, and 100,000 users.

Move Loot was backed by First Round Capital, Index Ventures, Google Ventures, Metamorphic Ventures, and others. As of November 2015, Move Loot had received $21.8 M in funding. It ceased operations in July 2016.

== Process ==
Users submitted photos of their goods online for appraisal, and the company then managed aspects of the selling, shipping and installation process. The company assessed furniture prior to posting it, and had minimum standards for style and quality. Move Loot earned 50% of the selling price when items were sold. Part of the company's business paradigm was for less furniture to be sent to landfills and to increase the length of time furniture was used.

== See also ==
- Bassett Furniture
