= Wolf Furniture =

American furniture retailer

- Company type: Private
- Industry: Furniture retail
- Founded: Altoona, Pennsylvania; 1902; 124 years ago
- Defunct: 2020; 6 years ago
- Fate: Reopened under new ownership 2024; 2 years ago
- Key people: Charles Wolf (Founder)
- Products: Furniture
- Website: www.shopwolffurniture.com

Wolf Furniture was a furniture retailer operating eighteen showrooms throughout Pennsylvania, Maryland, and Virginia under the Wolf Furniture and Gardiner Wolf Furniture store names.

== History ==
The company, originally City Furniture Company, was founded in 1902 by Charles Wolf and John Fox in downtown Altoona, Pennsylvania. In 1915, Wolf bought out Fox's interests, constructed a new five-story building in Altoona, Pennsylvania, and renamed the business Wolf Furniture Company. At that time, it was the largest furniture store between Pittsburgh and Harrisburg, Pennsylvania.

After Wolf's death in 1918, sons George and Herbert opened ten locations in and around Altoona. By 1992, the chain had grown to eighteen stores in Pennsylvania, Maryland and West Virginia. That year, the company decided to sell off fourteen of its stores to Heilig-Meyers Furniture. The Wolf chain, however, would eventually expand again including returning to locations held prior to the Heilig-Meyers sale. In 2000, Doug Wolf became the 8th president of Wolf Furniture Company. By 2003, the company volume exceeded $70,000,000, qualifying Wolf Furniture for a spot in the Top 100 among U.S. home furnishing retailers. The company expanded to include twelve locations in three states. The newest showroom was opened in Leesburg, Virginia in 2012. In 2013, long time Wolf executive Gene Stoltz was promoted to President of Wolf Furniture Company.

In 2014, Paula Deen visited the Hagerstown showroom for a meet and greet with over 1,500 fans in promotion of her Universal Furniture collection, Paula Deen Home Furniture. In 2015, Wolf Furniture purchased the 73-year-old Maryland-based Gardiners Furniture chain and rebranded the stores Gardiner Wolf. This acquisition brought the number of Wolf-owned stores to eighteen. In 2017, Wolf Furniture was acquired by Art Van Furniture. Under the agreement, the Wolf company maintained its name and all current management and staff.

In 2020, Art Van Furniture filed for Chapter 11 bankruptcy with plans to liquidate all company-owned stores. The timing of the company's bankruptcy meant liquidation sales were cut short due to the COVID-19 pandemic, and the case was converted to Chapter 7 bankruptcy by April. Two of the former Wolf stores in central Pennsylvania were acquired by Levin Furniture in 2020 and re-opened under the Levin name in 2021.

In mid 2024, The location in Towson, Maryland reopened under new ownership while retaining the Wolf Furniture name. <ref>https://www.wmar2news.com/aroundtown/wolf-furniture-has-reopened-in-towson </ref>
