= El Dorado Furniture =

El Dorado Furniture is a chain of furniture stores based in South Florida. The company was founded by Manuel Capó in 1967 and is currently owned and operated by the Capó family. There are currently 15 El Dorado Furniture showrooms and 3 outlets throughout South Florida. The company opened the largest showroom in the state of Florida in 2004.

In 1994, El Dorado Furniture opened its first Boulevard showroom, a design concept which would eventually be implemented into all of its stores. The Boulevard is a facade of a main street surrounded by "shops" that serve as dedicated showrooms for different categories of furniture.
