= Perfecthome =

Rent-to-own retailer operating across Great Britain

PerfectHome
- Type: Private
- Industry: Retailer
- Founded: October 2006
- Defunct: 2022
- Headquarters: Birmingham, UK
- Area served: United Kingdom
- Products: Furniture; Consumer electronics Household appliances
- Number of employees: 250
- Parent: Brixworth Investments (UK) Ltd
- Website: PerfectHome

PerfectHome was a rent-to-own retailer operating across Great Britain. It enabled customers to pay weekly for household and electrical goods.

== History ==
The business was established on 30 October 2006, selling furniture, entertainment devices, appliances and technology. Customers who buy products from PerfectHome on a pay weekly basis enter a hire purchase agreement with the company, which charges a representative APR of 69.5% APR to 119.9%.

In 2011, American lease-to-own company Aaron's, Inc. bought a minority stake in PerfectHome, valuing the company at £87m.

In 2016, PerfectHome launched a £4m advertising campaign featuring a talking cat, co-created with Wallace and Gromit creators Aardman Animations.

In early 2018 PerfectHome saw interest from a number of potential buyers, and in June 2018 the business was sold to Brixworth Investments (UK) Ltd., an affiliate of Elliott Advisors (UK) Limited.

As of June 2019, PerfectHome had approximately 250 employees, with a head office in Birmingham.

In March 2022, PerfectHome entered administration.

== Industry regulator ==
In April 2014, the consumer credit industry regulator changed from the Office of Fair Trading (OFT) to the Financial Conduct Authority (FCA). Companies that held an OFT licence and registered for interim permission were allowed to continue carrying out consumer credit activities whilst their applications for FCA authorisation were considered.

As PerfectHome worked towards FCA authorisation, the FCA advised the company that some of its historic practices did not meet the new required standards for consumer credit firms, including processes around theft and accidental damage insurance, cancelled sales and a smaller number of affordability checks. In March 2018, PerfectHome agreed with the FCA on a package of redress totalling over £2.1 million, made up of cash payments and balance write-offs for 37,000 customers.

PerfectHome received FCA authorisation on 14 December 2017.

In April 2019 the FCA introduced a pricing cap for the rent-to-own sector, with a new set of rules about pricing and the total cost of agreements. As an FCA-authorised business, PerfectHome had to adjust its pricing to comply with the new rules.

== ASA rulings ==
On 24 May 2016, PerfectHome broadcast a TV advert which was later challenged by the Advertising Standards Agency (ASA). A viewer argued that the advert didn't give the APR (Annual Percentage Rate) figure adequate prominence, as required. The ASA argued whether the advert, particularly the claim "style up the kitchen with big brand appliances", promoted the purchase of items on high-interest credit in an irresponsible manner. The investigation was upheld, and the ASA confirmed that the advert had breached BCAP Code rule 1.2 (Social responsibility). In turn, the advert was removed from broadcast.

On 25 October 2018, PerfectHome broadcast a TV advert which was later challenged by the ASA. A complaint highlighted that the advert used lyrics from the Fairground Attraction song 'Perfect': "It's got to be perfect, it's got to be worth it. Too many people take second best, but I won't take anything less. It's got to be perfect" while walking around a house that contained a number of high-value items such as an iPad, wireless headphones, an American-style fridge freezer, and a flat screen TV. The ASA argued whether the use of the lyrics combined with luxury items promoted the purchase of items on high-interest credit in an irresponsible manner.
