= Norton Furniture =

Furniture store in Cleveland, Ohio

Coordinates: 41°30′19″N 81°40′36″W

- Type: Furniture store
- Headquarters: Cleveland, Ohio, United States
- Key people: Marc Brown
- Products: Furniture

Norton Furniture is a Cleveland-based furniture store that is known across the Internet for its strange and unusual late night television commercials.

Norton Furniture is owned and operated by Marc Brown, who inherited the business from his father in 1995. The store is located in downtown Cleveland on the corner of Payne Avenue and East 21st Street. The store is now out of business and as of 2023 the building owners were involved in a lawsuit.

== Advertising ==
Norton Furniture is widely known for its unorthodox B-Rate commercials, as they have circulated across the Internet on many viral video sites. The commercials are known for their wacky characters and low production value, as well as the spokesperson for Norton Furniture. Brown sports a gray ponytail and glasses, and has an unmistakable quiet, raspy voice, due to physical damage to his throat when he was a child. The tagline of the commercials is "If you can't get credit in my store, you can't get credit anywhere. My name is Marc, and you can count on it!"

Common elements include local actors as well as mannequins to which he often delivers his spiel, and a comedic skit structure.

The commercials have been featured on MTV's viral video show and several late-night television programs, and were among the local TV programs which were awarded "Best of All Time" (2007) in the Cleveland Free Times.

Brown participated in the 2010 campaign to keep LeBron James in Cleveland, by appearing in the Please Stay LeBron video organized by local comedian Mike Polk.

To announce the quesalupa, Taco Bell featured Marc Brown in a regional Super Bowl 50 commercial.
