= Feather & Black =

Furniture retailer based in Southern England

- Type: Private company
- Industry: Retail
- Founded: 2004
- Founder: Robbie Feather; Adam Black
- Headquarters: Surrey, England, UK
- Number of locations: 8
- Products: Furniture
- Website: www.featherandblack.com

Feather & Black is a British furniture retailer based in High Wycombe, England. It has eight stores throughout the United Kingdom, and also sells online.

== History ==
The company was founded in 2004 by Robbie Feather and Adam Black. Later, it was bought by the Wade Group. In 2017, the Swedish manufacturer Hilding Anders acquired 17 of the 20 Feather & Black stores.

== Awards ==
Feather & Black has won the Gold Standard at the Direct Commerce Awards in the Home including Food & Drink category. It won the House Beautiful Award in Best Furniture Range category. It was featured as the Best Luxury Topper Without The Price Tag by the Evening Standard.
