= Directors Guild of America Award for Outstanding Directorial Achievement in Commercials =

Annual award for commercial directing

- Awarded for: Outstanding Directorial Achievement in Commercials
- Country: United States
- Presented by: Directors Guild of America
- First award: 1979
- Currently held by: Kim Gehrig (2025)
- Website: https://www.dga.org

The Directors Guild of America Award for Outstanding Directorial Achievement in Commercials is one of the annual Directors Guild of America Awards given by the Directors Guild of America. It was first awarded at the 32nd Directors Guild of America Awards in 1980.

== Winners and nominees ==
=== 1970s ===
Year	Winners and nominees	Commercials	Ref.
1979 (32nd)	Robert Lieberman	–	
1979 (32nd)	Bob Giraldi	–	
1979 (32nd)	R. Hagmann	–	
1979 (32nd)	N. Lacy	–	
1979 (32nd)	Richard Loew	–	

=== 1980s ===
Year	Winners and nominees	Commercials	Ref.
1980 (33rd)	George Gomes	A&W Restaurants' "Dancing", Bell System's "Joey Called", and Sara Lee's "Red Dye"	
1980 (33rd)	Allan Dennis	–	
1980 (33rd)	Bob Giraldi	Broadway's "Evita" and Miller Lite's "Pool"	
1980 (33rd)	Richard Loew	Breakstone' "Bedtime" and "Mom", and Beauvalle's "Toulouse"	
1980 (33rd)	Gérard Pirès	–	
1981 (34th)	Richard Levine	Pepsi's "First Love" and "Papa", and Kodak's "Summer Colt"	
1981 (34th)	R. Hagmann	The Church of Jesus Christ of Latter-day Saints' "Julie Through the Looking Glass", and Coca-Cola's "Railway Crossing"	
1981 (34th)	Tibor Hirsch	SOS's "Anniversary", Partager's "Camargue", United Airlines' "Clem's Story", and GTE's "Santa's Workshop"	
1981 (34th)	Joe Pytka	Henry Weinhard's' "Alaska", Bud Light's "Football", and Coca-Cola's "Thirsty Workers"	
1981 (34th)	Melvin Sokolsky	Fisher's "Beam" and Dr Pepper's "Roundy Room" and "Whistling"	
1982 (35th)	Joe Pytka	Bud Light's "Baseball" and "Basketball", and Henry Weinhard's' "Future/Gallup"	
1982 (35th)	William Dear	Budweiser's "Here's To You", KIMN's "Patron" and "Waitresses", and ABC Sports' "Promo"	
1982 (35th)	R. Hagmann	Coca-Cola's "Soccer", and the Church of Jesus Christ of Latter-day Saints' "Video Games"	
1982 (35th)	Richard Loew	The Travelers Companies' "Auto", IBM's "Bakery", American Express' "City Terrace", Fotomat's "Grandmothers", and 7 Up's "Of Course You Do"	
1982 (35th)	Norman Toback	Activision's "River Raid", Straw Hat Pizza's "Tim Conway/Horse", and GTE's "Trip"	
1983 (36th)	Bob Brooks	–	
1983 (36th)	Stuart Hagmann	–	
1983 (36th)	Manny Perez	Dr Pepper's "Detective", "Hunchback", and "Last Meal"	
1983 (36th)	Joe Pytka	Bud Light's "Boxer", "Pairs", and "Rodeo"	
1983 (36th)	Neil Tardio	United States Army's "Father & Son" and Xerox' "Laser Printing"	
1984 (37th)	Stuart Hagmann	The Church of Jesus Christ of Latter-day Saints' "Right Moment", IBM's "Skates", and McDonald's' "Stranger in the House"	
1984 (37th)	William Dear	Budweiser's "3D" and "Window Washers, Frontier's "Concourse of Doom", Honda's "Devo", and Bell Atlantic's "Dragnet"	
1984 (37th)	Leslie Dektor	Levi's' "Blues", John Player & Sons' "Own the Night", and NutraSweet's "Wait"	
1984 (37th)	Richard Levine	The Church of Jesus Christ of Latter-day Saints' "Good Samaritans" and Sonecor's "Radio Telescope"	
1984 (37th)	Michael Ulick	Coca-Cola's "First Job", American Greetings' "Peace", and Kodak's "Statue of Liberty"	
1985 (38th)	Ed Bianchi	Diet Pepsi's "Forward Pass", National Institute on Drug Abuse's "Gauntlet", Bounce's "Jump", and American Express' "Young Lawyers"	
1985 (38th)	Leslie Dektor	Apple's "American Dream" and "Changes", Levi's' "Bluesmen" and "The Gathering", and Coca-Cola's "Havens"	
1985 (38th)	Jim Johnston	United Negro College Fund's "Father and Son", California Cooler's "Matt", and Nike's "The Shooter"	
1985 (38th)	Richard Levine	Pacific Bell's "Boxers" and the Church of Jesus Christ of Latter-day Saints' "The More I See You"	
1985 (38th)	Joe Pytka	Pepsi's "Archeology", Special Olympics' "E.T. Special Olympics", and Henry Weinhard's' "Saloon"	
1986 (39th)	Joe Pytka	John Hancock Financial's "Brothers", Henry Weinhard's' "Chuck Wagon", and Pepsi's "Floats"	
1986 (39th)	Jeremiah S. Chechik	Connecticut Bank's "Clock Tower", Michelob's "Tonight, Tonight", and AT&T's "Wave"	
1986 (39th)	Leslie Dektor	Levi's' "Celebration", Blue Cross' "Gallstones", Home Savings of America's "Harold Arlund", and SecureHorizons' "Harry's Neighborhood"	
1986 (39th)	Richard Levine	Pacific Bell's "Father & Son", Wells Fargo's "Grass Valley", and Gallo's "Weddings"	
1986 (39th)	Sidney Myers	United Way's "American Way", "Family in Crisis" and "Youth in Crisis", and Bell Atlantic's "Beauty Parlor", "Girl Trouble" and "Jazzman"	
1987 (40th)	Richard Levine	Pepsi's "Apartment 10-G", DuPont's "Bill Demby", and Arnott's Biscuits' "Trouble"	
1987 (40th)	Leslie Dektor	Drug Free America Foundation's "Girl & Dealer" and "Tricks of the Trade", and United Airlines' "Pep Talk"	
1987 (40th)	Robert Lieberman	Hallmark Cards' "40th Birthday" and McDonald's' "New Kid"	
1987 (40th)	Jeffrey Lovinger	American Express' "Recital", Little Caesars' "The Wisdom", and Aetna's "World Series"	
1987 (40th)	Joe Pytka	Perrier's "Continents", John Hancock Financial's "40th Birthday", and Apple's "I'm Different"	
1988 (41st)	James Gartner	The Church of Jesus Christ of Latter-day Saints' "Braces & Glasses", Major League Baseball's "Interesting Friends", and Church World Service's "Journal"	
1988 (41st)	David Ashwell	Crossland Federal Savings Bank's "Detective", Gallo's "Dinner for Six", Kellogg's' "Hard Days Work", and Pepsi's "Thumbs Up"	
1988 (41st)	Leslie Dektor	Security Pacific Bank's "Football", Schlage's "School", and Levi's' "Yo Yo Do-Wop"	
1988 (41st)	Richard Levine	Delta Air Lines' "Company B", Hyundai's "Escape", and Seagram's "Kzev" and "Relationships"	
1988 (41st)	Robert Lieberman	AT&T's "Celebration", and McDonald's' "County Champ" and "Olympic Hopefuls"	
1989 (42nd)	David Cornell	AT&T's "Small Town"	
1989 (42nd)	Leslie Dektor	Pepsi's "Glasnost", International Cotton Association's "One Day", and United Airlines' "Speech"	
1989 (42nd)	James Gartner	First City Texas' "Going Back to Work", Pizza Hut's "Right Field", and Barnett Bank's "World Series"	
1989 (42nd)	Michael Grasso	Dr Pepper's "Baseball" and 7-Eleven's "Proposal" and "Small Businessmen"	
1989 (42nd)	Richard Levine	Pepsi's "Missing Link" and "Two Michaels", and Sprint's "Trauma Unit"	

=== 1990s ===
Year	Winners and nominees	Commercials	Ref.
1990 (43rd)	Peter Smillie	Jeep Wrangler's "Driving Lesson", United Parcel Service's "Ian Alistair Mackenzie", National Council on Alcoholism's "Little Girl", and FMC Corporation's "Perfectionist"	
1990 (43rd)	Leslie Dektor	Mercedes-Benz' "Interview", Saturn's "Launch", and Bell Atlantic's "Sundays"	
1990 (43rd)	James Gartner	Pizza Hut's "Driveway" and "The Big Moment", and AT&T's "Why Not"	
1990 (43rd)	Michael Grasso	Hallmark Cards' "100th Birthday" and Centers for Disease Control and Prevention's "HIV Positive"	
1990 (43rd)	Joe Pytka	Nike's "Bo & Bo", FedEx' "New Technology", and Diet Pepsi's "Opera"	
1991 (44th)	Joe Pytka	Hallmark Cards' "Dance Card" and Nike's "The Bo Show"	
1991 (44th)	Leslie Dektor	Bell Atlantic's "Joanne", Saturn's "Petersburg", and Tele-Communications Inc.'s "Taxi Driver"	
1991 (44th)	James Gartner	FedEx' "Adoption" and HBO's "Party"	
1991 (44th)	Stephen Kessler	MasterCard's "Directions", Tony's Pizza's "House", MCI Communications' "Joe College", Giant Eagle's "Romeo & Julie" and "Tea Time", and Jack in the Box' "Trapeze Act"	
1991 (44th)	Domenic Mastrippolito	AIDS Project Los Angeles' "Talk About It"	
1992 (45th)	Leslie Dektor	American Express' "Elevator", US West's "Missed the Bus", Bank of America's "Second Generation", and Southern California Edison's "Truth"	
1992 (45th)	William Patterson	Philips' "DCC Clear Sound"	
1992 (45th)	Joe Pytka	Nike's "Hare Jordan" and Hallmark Cards' "Old Friend"	
1993 (46th)	James Gartner	FedEx' "Applause" and "Golden Package", and AT&T's "Baseball & Piroshki"	
1993 (46th)	Mark Coppos	United Parcel Service's "Drivers" and "The Office", Reebok's "Kick/Farmer-Patrick", MasterCard's "Supermarket", and Infiniti's "Walkaround/Rehearsal"	
1993 (46th)	Daniel Duchovny	Wachovia's "Crown Account", Pine Street Inn's "I'll Be Home For Christmas", Foundation Health's "Otters", and Harvard Community Health Plan's "Scott"	
1993 (46th)	Peter Goldschmidt	Air France's "Speed of Sound"	
1993 (46th)	Joe Pytka	Nike's "Barkley of Seville" and "Kenya", and Pepsi's "Playground"	
1994 (47th)	Michael Bay	California Milk's "Aaron Burr", "Baby and Cat" and "Vending Machine", Miller Lite's "Big Lawyer Round-up", and Nike's "Deion Sanders"	
1994 (47th)	Leslie Dektor	IBM's "French Guys" and "Nuns", American Airlines' "Important", and Buena Vista's "Snow White"	
1994 (47th)	Tony Kaye	Volvo's "Photographer" and "Stuntman", and Dunlop's "Unexpected"	
1994 (47th)	Ray Lawrence	MCI's "Death on the 19th Hole", "E-Mail" and "Martin"	
1994 (47th)	Joe Pytka	Nike's "Season's Song" and "The Wall", and Pepsi's "Summer of Love"	
1995 (48th)	Robert Lieberman	Hallmark Cards' "Jeffrey's Secret" and Merrill Lynch's "Sisters Already Retired"	
1995 (48th)	Steven Chase	Pepsi's "All Sports Basketball", Mountain Dew's "Crooner", Anheuser-Busch's "Fishing" and "Primate", and AT&T's "Paddleball"	
1995 (48th)	Tony Kaye	Guinness' "Men & Women", TAG Heuer's "Mind Games", and Volvo's "Twister"	
1995 (48th)	Joe Pytka	Pepsi's "Diner", "Set Piece" and "Stranded"	
1995 (48th)	Kinka Usher	Timex Corporation's "Angel" and "Dog To Vet", and California Milk's "Full Body Cast", "Interrogation" and "Trix"	
1996 (49th)	Tarsem Singh	Nike's "Good vs. Evil", Levi's' "Poolboy", and Coca-Cola's "Red"	
1996 (49th)	James Gartner	Apple's "Crowd Control" and AT&T's "Amazing Grace"	
1996 (49th)	David Kellogg	Little Caesars' "Training Camp", American Express' "Gas Pump", and Kodak's "Pie Plate"	
1996 (49th)	Peter Nydrle	Coca-Cola's "Savion’s Challenge", Harley-Davidson's "Waiting for the Bus" and "Birds", National Car Rental's "Dolphins", Maxfli's "Tell You Something", and Reebok's "Gods"	
1996 (49th)	Kinka Usher	Nissan's "Dream Garage", "Toys - G.I. Joe" and "Parking Meter", and Polaroid's "Dog & Cat" and "Architect"	
1997 (50th)	Bruce Dowad	Isuzu's "Giant", Mercedes-Benz' "Don't Fence Me In", and Coca-Cola's "World Dance"	
1997 (50th)	Robert Black	Lay's' "Antonio", Rite Aid's "Firefighter", and Southwestern Bell's "Rancher"	
1997 (50th)	Thom Higgins	Weyerhaeuser's "Love Note", Oreo's "Basketball", and Ford's "Generations"	
1997 (50th)	Erich Joiner	Smith & Wesson's "Bonus", "Yacht" and "Grandma"	
1997 (50th)	David Wild	Washington's Lottery's "Born to be Wild", Zima's "Sticky Shoes", and Saturn's "Doc Payne"	
1998 (51st)	Kinka Usher	Sony's "Egg", Mountain Dew's "Michael Johnson's World", Miller Brewing's "Cupid", Nike's "Undercover Ushers", and Hallmark's "Neighbor Lady"	
1998 (51st)	Amy Hill and Chris Riess	Saturn's "Driving Range", Bronson Medical Centers' "Pediatrics", AmSouth's "Life", and Long John Silver's' "London Loves Us"	
1998 (51st)	Peter Darley Miller	360 Communications' "Chase", Slice's "Dissection", Midway Games' "Target Practice", PlayStation's "Scout", and Nike's "The Great Magician"	
1998 (51st)	Rocky Morton	Taco Bell's "Bobbing Head" and "Romeo and Juliet", Fox Sports' "Feet", and PlayStation's "Laundromat"	
1998 (51st)	Tarsem Singh	John Hancock Financial's "Sarajevo", Miller Brewing's "Séance" and "Dances with Dog", and Beck's' "Romance"	
1999 (52nd)	Bryan Buckley	Monster.com's "When I Grow Up", E-Trade's "TriMount Studios" and "Broker", and OnHealth.com's "Friends"	
1999 (52nd)	Adam Cameron and Simon Cole	Frito-Lay's "Sizes", Church's Chicken's "Fire 2", Adidas' "El Duque Dance", Amazon's "Two Minutes", Dreyer's' "Truck Driver", and Snapple's "Sponsor"	
1999 (52nd)	Leslie Dektor	Coca-Cola's "Downhill Racer", e.Score.com's "The Debate", and Allstate's "Anthem"	
1999 (52nd)	Rocky Morton	Lexus' "Fly", Homestead's "Comb" and "Stick", and The Minus Man's "Promo"	
1999 (52nd)	Dewey Nicks	Ameritrade's "Let’s Light this Candle", "I Just Want to be Held" and "Square Dance", and Union Bay's "Rocket Man"	

=== 2000s ===
Year	Winners and nominees	Commercials	Ref.
2000 (53rd)	Leslie Dektor	Idea Exchange's "New Eyes" and "The Run Home", and Pocketcards's "The Check"	
2000 (53rd)	Dante Ariola	Nike's "Elephant" and Hewlett-Packard's "Tickets" and "Taxi"	
2000 (53rd)	Bryan Buckley	FedEx' "Action Figures" and E-Trade's "Monkey", "Wazoo" and "Basketball"	
2000 (53rd)	David Cornell	Visa's "Synchronized Commercialism", "Tattoo" and "I Enjoy Being a Girl", and Charles Schwab's "Ringo" and "Retirement"	
2000 (53rd)	Lenard Dorfman	IBM's "Harlem Fencer" and "Senegal Women's Basketball", and Excite's "Camped"	
2001 (54th)	Bob Kerstetter	Musco Family Olive's "Worker", "Orphanage", and "Birds"	
2001 (54th)	Adam Cameron and Simon Cole	Dr Pepper/Seven Up's "Calendar", "Captive Audience" and "Singers", Cingular Wireless's "Touchdown Dance School", Visa's "Baby Talk", and Toyota's "Subtitles"	
2001 (54th)	Craig Gillespie	Holiday Inn Express' "Kiss Reunion", Citibank's "Delivery Room" and "College Tuition", Ameritech's "Plumber", and SBC's "Welcome Wagon"	
2001 (54th)	Joe Pytka	NYC Miracle's "The Deli" and "Skating", Disney's "Pillow Talk", and Ad Council's "Ketchup Soup"	
2001 (54th)	Baker Smith	Lucky Magazine's "Cheryl 'N Me", Fox Sports' "Nail Gun", Toshiba's "Asylum", and Heineken's "Birth of Scratching"	
2002 (55th)	Baker Smith	Canal+'s "Black Bands" and "Visigoths", Fox Sports' "Lightning" and "Wind", and BMW's "Clown"	
2002 (55th)	Dante Ariola	PlayStation 2's "Signs", Lee's "Cheese", and Bank of America's "Butcher"	
2002 (55th)	Leslie Dektor	American Express' "Crazy Love", America's Second Harvest's "Rent or Food", and Verizon's "Lady Liberty"	
2002 (55th)	Craig Gillespie	Citibank's "Treadmill", Holiday Inn Express' "Snake Bite", Chevrolet's "Cops", SBC's "Coffee Machine", and EDS's "Suki"	
2002 (55th)	Noam Murro	Saturn's "Sheet Metal", eBay's "Do It eBay", and E-Trade's "Pick" and "Pitch"	
2003 (56th)	David Fincher	Nike's "Gamebreakers" and "Speed Chain", and Xelibri's "Beauty for Sale"	
2003 (56th)	Lance Acord	Adidas' "Wake Up Call", Nike's "Cross Country Spirit", and Mitsubishi's "Part Car, Part Religion"	
2003 (56th)	Errol Morris	Miller's "Pager" and "Alternative Fuel", Nike's "Bernard" and "Kathryn", and Cisco's "Meanwhile"	
2003 (56th)	Noam Murro	Got Milk?'s "Birthday", Saturn's "Beautiful", and Bud Light's "Mr. Way Too Much Cologne Wearer"	
2003 (56th)	Joe Pytka	Gatorade's "23 vs. 39", IBM's "Prodigy", and Nextel's "Shakespeare"	
2004 (57th)	Noam Murro	Adidas' "Carry", Starbucks' "Glen", and eBay's "Toy Boat"	
2004 (57th)	Dante Ariola	Stella Artois' "Circus", Levi's' "Urban Legend", and Barclays' "Money Tree"	
2004 (57th)	Fredrik Bond	Three's "Cherry" and "Jelly Fish", and Nike's "The Other Game"	
2004 (57th)	Andrew Douglas	Renault's "Feel It", PricewaterhouseCoopers' "The Air", Barclays' "New Day", and Microsoft's "Hat"	
2004 (57th)	Jim Jenkins	Discovery Channel's "Antlers" and "Milk Truck", Nextel's "Dance Party", and TBS' "Strange Fruit"	
2005 (58th)	Craig Gillespie	Ameriquest's "Surprise Dinner" and "Mini-Mart", and Altoids's "People of Pain" and "Fable of the Fruit Bat"	
2005 (58th)	Spike Jonze	Adidas' "Hello Tomorrow", Miller Beer's "Penguin", and Gap's "Pardon Our Dust"	
2005 (58th)	Rocky Morton	BellSouth's "Kung Fu Clowns" and "Dance Fight Plumbers", Cheese Nips' "Office", and CSI's "Take Me Home"	
2005 (58th)	Noam Murro	Hummer's "Monsters", Orange's "Black Out", and Nike's "Run Barefoot"	
2005 (58th)	Rupert Sanders	Adidas' "Made to Perfection" and Xbox's "Joy"	
2006 (59th)	Dante Ariola	Coca-Cola's "First Taste", Traveler's Insurance's "Snowball", and Johnnie Walker's "Human"	
2006 (59th)	Bryan Buckley	American Express' "Animal" and Burger King's "Manthem" and "More Mayo"	
2006 (59th)	David Gray	Tribeca Film Festival's "Transvestite" and "Mugger", Full Tilt Poker's "Jesus Throws", and eBay's "Born"	
2006 (59th)	Tom Kuntz	Altoids' "Fruit Pants" and Skittles' "Trade", "Beard" and "Leak"	
2006 (59th)	Joe Pytka	Budweiser's "Clydesdales American Dream", Disney's "Preparation", and WTC Memorial's "Where Were You"	
2007 (60th)	Nicolai Fuglsig	Guinness' "Tipping Point", J. C. Penney's "It's Magic", and Motorola's "Journey"	
2007 (60th)	Dante Ariola	PlayStation 3' "Grenade", Wrigley's "Flare", and Nike's "Addicted"	
2007 (60th)	Fredrik Bond	Got Milk?'s "Straw" and J. C. Penney's "Aviator"	
2007 (60th)	Frank Budgen	Bravia's "Playdoh" and Save Our Selves/Live Earth's "S.O.S."	
2007 (60th)	Noam Murro	Volkswagens's "Night Drive", Orbit's "Affair", and NBA's "Remember"	
2008 (61st)	Peter Thwaites	Barclaycard's "Waterslide" and Guinness' "Light Show"	
2008 (61st)	Fredrik Bond	Levi's' "First Time"	
2008 (61st)	David Fincher	Nike's "Fate", Apple's "Hallway", and Stand Up to Cancer's "Stand Up For Something"	
2008 (61st)	Tom Kuntz	FedEx's "Carrier Pigeons", Xbox's "Lips", Skittles' "Pinata", and Got Milk?'s "White Gold Is"	
2008 (61st)	Rupert Sanders	Air Jordan's "Clock Tower"	
2009 (62nd)	Tom Kuntz	Cadbury's "Eyebrows", Old Spice's "Scents For Gents", Skittles' "Tailor", and CareerBuilder's "Tips"	
2009 (62nd)	Joaquin Baca-Asay	CSX's "Breathe", Bank of America's "Doors", LensCrafters' "See What You Love", and Volvo's "Switch"	
2009 (62nd)	Garth Davis	U.S. Cellular's "Shadow Puppets"	
2009 (62nd)	Craig Gillespie	Cars.com's "David Abernathy", Guinness' "Slide", and Orbit's "Dusty"	
2009 (62nd)	Chris Palmer	Budweiser's "Lyric" and J2O's "Riviera Truckstop (Garage Playboy)" and "A Horse Called Cynthia (Cowboy - Mr. Darcy)"	

=== 2010s ===
Year	Winners and nominees	Commercials	Ref.
2010 (63rd)	Stacy Wall	Nike's "Rise" and "Handshake", Microsoft's "Really?", and Adidas' "Slim Chin & D Rose"	
2010 (63rd)	Frank Budgen	Sony Bravia's "World Cup" and "Thunderstruck" and Honda's "RGB"	
2010 (63rd)	Craig Gillespie	Cars.com's "Timothy Richman", Snickers' "Game" and "Road Trip", and CareerBuilder's "Another Language" and "Casual Friday"	
2010 (63rd)	Tim Godsall	DirecTV's "Opulence", Hyundai's "Bull", and HBO's "Eastbound & Mom"	
2010 (63rd)	Tom Kuntz	Old Spice's "The Man Your Man Could Smell Like", "Questions", "Did You Know", and "Boat"	
2011 (64th)	Noam Murro	Heineken's "Handlebar Mustache", DirecTV's "Hot House", Battlefield 3's "Is It Real?", and Volkswagens's "Pinata"	
2011 (64th)	Lance Acord	Nike's "Paint the Town" and "The Chosen", Volkswagen's "The Force", and NBA's "Sweetest Moment"	
2011 (64th)	Dante Ariola	Volkswagen's "Black Betty", Nissan's "Gas Powered Everything", and Jim Beam's "Parallels"	
2011 (64th)	Fredrik Bond	Heineken's "Date" and "The Entrance"	
2011 (64th)	Steven Miller	Cheetos' "Fort", GEICO's "Guinea Pigs" and "Sushi", Ortega's "Parking Lot", and Dos Equis' "Pommel Horse", "Pygmy" and "Speed Dating"	
2012 (65th)	Alejandro González Iñárritu	Procter & Gamble's "Best Job"	
2012 (65th)	Lance Acord	Nike's "Jogger" and "Greatness", Volkswagen's "The Dog Strikes Back", and Levi's' "Thread"	
2012 (65th)	Steve Ayson	Carlton Draught's "Beer Chase"	
2012 (65th)	Fredrik Bond	Puma's "Surfer" and Budweiser's "Eternal Optimism"	
2012 (65th)	Tom Kuntz	Old Spice's "Terry Crews Muscle Music" and DirecTV's "Stray Animals", "Roadside Ditch" and "Platoon"	
2013 (66th)	Martin de Thurah	Hennessy V.S' "The Man Who Couldn't Slow Down" and Acura's "Human Race"	
2013 (66th)	Fredrik Bond	Heineken's "Voyage" and Johnnie Walker's "From The Future"	
2013 (66th)	John X. Carey	Dove's "Real Beauty Sketches"	
2013 (66th)	Noam Murro	Guinness' "Basketball", DirecTV's "Kids", and Volkswagen's "Mask"	
2013 (66th)	Matthijs van Heijningen	PlayStation's "Perfect Day" and Verizon's "#Forty Eight"	
2014 (67th)	Nicolai Fuglsig	Guinness' "Sapeurs" and FEMA's "Waiting"	
2014 (67th)	Lauren Greenfield	Always' "Always #LikeAGirl"	
2014 (67th)	Brendan Malloy and Emmett Malloy	Nike's "The Huddle"	
2014 (67th)	Daniel Mercadante and Katina Hubbard	Dick's Sporting Goods' "Sports Matter" and Facebook's "We Are Not Alone" and "Big Sister"	
2014 (67th)	Noam Murro	Dodge's "Ahead of Their Time" and Guinness' "Empty Chair"	
2015 (68th)	Andreas Nilsson	Comcast's "Emily's Oz", General Electric's "Time Upon a Once", and Old Spice's "Dad Song"	
2015 (68th)	Juan Cabral	IKEA's "Monkeys" and Lurpak's "Freestyle"	
2015 (68th)	Miles Jay	ESPN's "It Can Wait"	
2015 (68th)	Tom Kuntz	Old Spice's "So It Begins", Heineken's "The Chase", and Clash of Clans' "Revenge"	
2015 (68th)	Steve Rogers	Nike Golf's "Ripple" and Nike's "Snow Day"	
2016 (69th)	Derek Cianfrance	Nike Golf's "Chase", Powerade's "Doubts" and "Expectations", and Squarespace's "Manifesto"	
2016 (69th)	Lance Acord	Apple's "Frankie's Holiday" and Kohl's' "Movie Night"	
2016 (69th)	Dante Ariola	SunTrust's "Hold Your Breath", Lyft's "Riding is the New Driving", and Beats' "Tell Me When To Go"	
2016 (69th)	Fredrik Bond	Apple's "Dive", Philips' "Everyday Hero", and LG's "World of Play"	
2016 (69th)	A.G. Rojas	S7 Airlines' "The Best Planet" and Samsung's "The Snail"	
2017 (70th)	Martin de Thurah	StubHub's "Festival" and "Machines", and Wealthsimple's "Mad World"	
2017 (70th)	Alma Har'el	Procter & Gamble's "Love without Bias"	
2017 (70th)	Will Hoffman and Julius Metoyer	KitchenAid's "Anthem" and Ford's "Go Further"	
2017 (70th)	Miles Jay	Bose's "Alive", and Squarespace's "Calling JohnMalkovich.com" and "Who is JohnMalkovich.com?"	
2017 (70th)	Isaiah Seret	Samsung's "Growing Up" and "I Love You", and Kohler's "Never Too Composed"	
2018 (71st)	Spike Jonze	Apple's "Welcome Home"	
2018 (71st)	Steve Ayson	Dollar Shave Club's "Getting Ready" and Speight's' "The Dance"	
2018 (71st)	Fredrik Bond	Virgin TV's "Harmony", BT Sport's "Take Them All On", and Confused.com's "The Big Win"	
2018 (71st)	Martin de Thurah	Audi's "Final Breath", Chase Bank's "Mama Said Knock You Out", and Macy's' "Space Station"	
2018 (71st)	David Shane	Babbel's "Alien" and Cure Alzheimer's Fund's "Mothers & Daughters"	
2019 (72nd)	Spike Jonze	Squarespace's "Dream It" and MedMen's "The New Normal"	
2019 (72nd)	Fredrik Bond	Hewlett-Packard's "Lighter Than Air,", Coca-Cola's "Take it Lightly", and Apple's "Nap"	
2019 (72nd)	Mark Molloy	Apple's "Underdogs"	
2019 (72nd)	Ridley Scott	Hennessy's "The Seven Worlds"	
2019 (72nd)	Dougal Wilson	AT&T's "Train"	

=== 2020s ===
Year	Winners and nominees	Commercials	Ref.
2020 (73rd)	Melina Matsoukas	Beats by Dre's "You Love Me"	
2020 (73rd)	Steve Ayson	Nike's "The Great Chase"	
2020 (73rd)	Nisha Ganatra	Bodyform/Libresse's "#wombstories"	
2020 (73rd)	Niclas Larsson	VW Touareg's "See the Unseen," Volvo XC60's "The Parents"	
2020 (73rd)	Taika Waititi	Coca-Cola's "The Letter"	
2021 (74th)	Bradford Young	Channel 4's "Super. Human."	
2021 (74th)	Steve Ayson	Mattress Firm's "Anthem", and Miller Lite's "Award Speech" and "Networking"	
2021 (74th)	Kathryn Bigelow	Apple's "Hollywood In Your Pocket"	
2021 (74th)	Ian Pons Jewell	Apple's "ECG" and "Sleep", Squarespace's "Time", and Instacart's "Your Mom’s Short Ribs"	
2021 (74th)	Henry-Alex Rubin	Sandy Hook Promise's "Teenage Dream"	
2022 (75th)	Kim Gehrig	Apple's "Accessibility" and "Run Baby Run"	
2022 (75th)	Juan Cabral	John Lewis & Partners' "For All Life's Moments" and Apple's "Share the Joy"	
2022 (75th)	Craig Gillespie	Apple's "Hard Knocks", Jimmy John's' "Problem", and Nissan's "Thrill Driver"	
2022 (75th)	David Shane	Apple's "Detectives", ITVX's "Smile", and Procter & Gamble's "Traffic Stop"	
2022 (75th)	Ivan Zachariáš	Apple's "Data Auction" and Upwork's "This Is How We Work Now"	
2023 (76th)	Kim Gehrig	Apple's "Run This Town" and Expedia's "The Travelers"	
2023 (76th)	Martin de Thurah	Levi's' "Fair Exchange" and "Legends Never Die"	
2023 (76th)	Seb Edwards	Battle of the Baddest's "Rumble"	
2023 (76th)	Craig Gillespie	Apple's "Waiting Room"	
2023 (76th)	Andreas Nilsson	Apple's "R.I.P. Leon" and "Action Mode", Les Mills' "Choose Happy" and Snapchat's "Wait'll You See This"	
2024 (77th)	Andreas Nilsson	Hennessy's "Board Game", Andrex' "First Office Poo", Apple's "One More, Apple", and Virgin Media's "Whizzer"	
2024 (77th)	Lance Acord	Volkswagen's "An American Love Story"	
2024 (77th)	Kim Gehrig	SiriusXM's "A Life in Sound", Nike's "Am I A Bad Person", and Apple's "Find Your Friends"	
2024 (77th)	Tim Heidecker and Eric Wareheim	CeraVe's "Michael CeraVe"	
2024 (77th)	Ivan Zachariáš	Apple's "Flock"	
2025 (78th)	Kim Gehrig (Somesuch)	Nike "You Can't Win. So Win." Apple "I'm Not Remarkable"	
2025 (78th)	Miles Jay (SMUGGLER)	ChatGPT "Dish", "Pull Up", "Trip" Meta "Home for the Holidays", "Secret Santa"	
2025 (78th)	Spike Jonze (MJZ)	Apple AirPods 4 "Someday"	
2025 (78th)	Andreas Nilsson (Biscuit Filmworks)	Andrex "Conquer the First School Poo" Apple iPhone 16 Pro "Garrett", "Big Flex" Virgin Media "Trunk Trucker"	
2025 (78th)	Steve Rogers (Biscuit Filmworks)	Amazon "Bring a Book to Life" Squarespace "A Tale as Old as Websites" Coinbase "Everything is Fine"	

== Individuals with multiple awards ==
3 awards

- Joe Pytka (1982, 1986, 1991)
- Kim Gehrig (2022, 2023, 2025)

2 awards

- Leslie Dektor
- Martin de Thurah
- Nicolai Fuglsig
- James Gartner
- Stuart Hagmann (consecutive)
- Spike Jonze (consecutive)
- Richard Levine
- Robert Lieberman
- Noam Murro
- Andreas Nilsson

== Individuals with multiple nominations ==
15 nominations

- Joe Pytka

13 nominations

- Leslie Dektor

9 nominations

- Fredrik Bond

8 nominations

- Noam Murro

7 nominations

- Dante Ariola
- Craig Gillespie
- Richard Levine

6 nominations

- James Gartner
- Tom Kuntz

5 nominations

- Lance Acord
- Stuart Hagmann

4 nominations

- Steve Ayson
- Kim Gehrig
- Spike Jonze
- Andreas Nilsson
- Martin de Thurah
- Robert Lieberman

3 nominations

- Bryan Buckley
- Miles Jay
- Richard Loew
- Rocky Morton
- Kinka Usher

2 nominations

- Frank Budgen
- Juan Cabral
- Adam Cameron
- Simon Cole
- David Cornell
- William Dear
- David Fincher
- Nicolai Fuglsig
- Bob Giraldi
- Michael Grasso
- Tony Kaye
- Steve Rogers
- Rupert Sanders
- David Shane
- Tarsem Singh
- Baker Smith
- Ivan Zachariáš
