= Kim Gehrig =

Australian director

- Born: Sydney, Australia
- Occupation: Film director
- Children: 2

Kim Gehrig is an Australian director whose body of work spans television shows, commercials, music videos, documentaries, short films and branded entertainment. Gehrig directed "The Woman Who Ate Photographs", an episode of Apple TV+ series, "Roar", starring Nicole Kidman. Her notable commercial works include Run This Town and Stay for Rihanna's Super Bowl LVII Halftime Show, The Greatest for Apple, Viva La Vulva for Libresse, Life Needs Truth for The New York Times, the This Girl Can campaign, and work for many more for brands including Airbnb, Google, Lyft, Nike, IKEA, GAP, and Amnesty International. In music videos, Gehrig has collaborated with artists such as Chaka Khan, Brittany Howard, Wiley, Calvin Harris, and Basement Jaxx. In 2023, Gehrig became the 2nd woman of all time to win the DGA Award for Outstanding Directorial Achievement in Commercials and her films have won a plethora of awards including Cannes Lions, D&AD pencils, BTAA Arrows and UKMVA's.

== Career ==
One of her first major works as a director was the 'You are Powerful' video for Amnesty International, released on the 60th anniversary of the Universal Declaration of Human Rights. For this she won a Silver Lion at Cannes Lions International Festival of Creativity 2010 and a broadcast award by the Young Director Awards.

Gehrig is represented by Somesuch, who were awarded Advertising Age's 2018 Production Company of the Year.

=== Music Videos ===
Gehrig has directed numerous music videos in addition to her advertising work. She won 'Best Urban Music Video' at the 2009 UK Music Video Awards for Wiley 's 'Cash in My Pocket', and was nominated in 2018 for her music video for Chaka Khan's 'Like Suga'.

=== Television ===
Gehrig directed "The Woman Who Ate Photographs", an episode of Apple TV+ series, "Roar", starring Nicole Kidman written by Liz Flahive and Carly Mensch.

=== The Greatest (Apple) ===
Her recent film for Apple, 'The Greatest,' challenged common stereotypes about people with disabilities while highlighting accessibility features available on the iPhone, iPad, Mac, and Apple Watch. The 2-minute film was made with the partnership and feedback of the disability community, both in front of and behind the camera. The lyrics of the film's soundtrack are based on speeches by Muhammad Ali, who became an advocate for disability after developing Parkinson's disease. The Australian group Spinifex Gum sang the song, which was then remixed by Cola Boyy along with improvised piano by Matthew Whitaker. Apple also released an audio-described version of the film to bring awareness to the needs of blind and low-vision audiences.

=== Viva la Vulva (Libresse) ===
Gehrig directed the award-winning 'Viva la Vulva' advert for Libresse, a celebration of the vagina and women body confidence. The video contains many items from normal life which resemble vaginas as well as puppetry and outfits resembling genitalia. It was set to the music of Camille Yarbrough's 'Take Yo' Praise'..

=== This Girl Can (Sport England) ===
Gehrig directed the multi award-winning advert for the This Girl Can campaign by Sport England to encourage more women to take part in sport. The video features personal and unfiltered clips of women exercising as they would be normally. The advert was praised for its bold and empowering message, winning awards including a Glass Lion for Good at Cannes Lions 2015. Sport England estimated that an additional 2.8 million women decided to take up a sport after the advert's release. The first advert was followed by 'Phenomenal Women', showcasing women from all walks of life engaging in sport set to Maya Angelou's recital of Phenomenal Woman. Gehrig stated in 2018 that 'This Girl Can' is the video she is most proud of.

=== Man on The Moon (John Lewis) ===
Later in 2015 Gehrig premiered the first John Lewis Christmas advert to be directed by a woman; 'Man on The Moon'. The advert constituted part of John Lewis' partnership with Age UK to raise awareness of loneliness in the elderly, showing a lonely old man living on the moon being sent a gift by a young girl on earth. The video was set to a cover of Oasis' 'Half the World Away' by Aurora.

=== The Best Men Can Be (Gillette) ===
Gehrig again rose to prominence in 2019 for 'The Best Men Can Be' advertising video by razor company Gillette, which challenges its earlier tagline of "The Best a Man Can Get" and the effects of toxic masculinity. The advert was praised by some for its message against the traditional concepts of how men should be, and how this impacts mental health as well as women. However, the advert was criticised by others for its negative portrayal of men. Multiple commentators, such as Piers Morgan, were incensed by the campaign and vowed to boycott the company. Marketing Week saw the backlash towards the ad as backfiring on Gillette following declining sales metrics for the brand that led to a $8bn writedown on the carrying value of Gillette’s goodwill. Gehrig responded to some of the criticism by saying: "The project had actually been conceived, written and edited by men. But because I'm a female director, it fitted neatly into a troll's narrative."

== Personal life ==
Gehrig was born in Sydney, Australia, and moved to London to study at Central Saint Martins, University of the Arts London. The first eight years of her career were spent as a Creative at advertising agency Mother.

Gehrig has two daughters, and currently lives in the United States.

== Awards ==
- 2008 Thinkbox October award for 'You are Powerful' (Amnesty International).
- 2009 Best Urban Video for Wiley's 'Cash in My Pocket' at the UK Music Video Awards.
- 2010 Broadcast Award by Young Director Awards for 'You are Powerful' (Amnesty International).
- 2010 Silver Lion by Cannes Lions for 'You are Powerful' (Amnesty International)
- 2015 Top director of the year by Campaign.
- 2015 Most creative people of the year by Fast Company.
- 2015 Grand Prix at the Glass Lion for Good Awards Cannes Lions for 'This Girl Can' by Sport England.
- 2015 Twelve total awards, including Gold for Best Direction - Single at Creative Circle for 'This Girl Can' by Sport England.
- 2016 Three silver British Arrows for 'This Girl Can' by Sport England.
- 2016 Graphite and White D&ad Pencils for 'This Girl Can' by Sport England.
- 2016 Two silver and one bronze British Arrow for 'Man on the Moon' by John Lewis.
- 2017 Wood D&ad Pencil for 'This Girl Can: Phenomenal Women' by Sport England.
- 2018 Most creative advertising campaign of the year by Advertising Age for 'Viva la Vulva' by Libresse.
- 2018 Advert of the year by Creative Review for 'Viva la Vulva' by Libresse.
- 2019 Black D&AD Pencil for 'Viva La Vulva' by Libresse.
- 2021 Adage Director of the Year
- 2022 Directors Guild of America Award for Outstanding Directorial Achievement in Commercials for directing Apple's Accessibility and Run Baby Run
- 2024 Directors Guild of America Award for Outstanding Directorial Achievement in Commercials for directing Run This Town, Apple Music – Apple (Client Direct) and The Travelers, Expedia – Wieden & Kennedy
