= 68th Directors Guild of America Awards =

- Date: February 6, 2016
- Location: Hyatt Regency Century Plaza, Los Angeles, California
- Country: United States
- Presented by: Directors Guild of America
- Hosted by: Jane Lynch

Highlights
- Best Director Feature Film: The Revenant – Alejandro G. Iñárritu
- Best Director Documentary: Cartel Land – Matthew Heineman
- Best Director First-Time Feature Film: Ex Machina – Alex Garland
- Website: https://www.dga.org/Awards/History/2010s/2015.aspx?value=2015

The 68th Directors Guild of America Awards, honoring the outstanding directorial achievements in films, documentary and television in 2015, were presented on February 6, 2016, at the Hyatt Regency Century Plaza. Jane Lynch hosted the ceremony for the third time. The nominees for the feature film categories were announced on January 12, 2016. The nominations for directing achievements in television, documentaries and commercials were announced on January 13, 2016.

== Winners and nominees ==
=== Film ===
Feature Film

Alejandro G. Iñárritu – The Revenant

- Tom McCarthy – Spotlight
- Adam McKay – The Big Short
- George Miller – Mad Max: Fury Road
- Ridley Scott – The Martian
Documentaries

Matthew Heineman – Cartel Land

- Jimmy Chin and Elizabeth Chai Vasarhelyi – Meru
- Liz Garbus – What Happened, Miss Simone?
- Alex Gibney – Going Clear: Scientology and the Prison of Belief
- Asif Kapadia – Amy
First-Time Feature Film

Alex Garland – Ex Machina

- Fernando Coimbra – A Wolf at the Door
- Joel Edgerton – The Gift
- Marielle Heller – The Diary of a Teenage Girl
- László Nemes – Son of Saul

=== Television ===
Drama Series

David Nutter – Game of Thrones for "Mother's Mercy"

- Michael Engler – Downton Abbey for "Episode Eight"
- Lesli Linka Glatter – Homeland for "The Tradition of Hospitality"
- Steven Soderbergh – The Knick for "Williams and Walker"
- Matthew Weiner – Mad Men for "Person to Person"
Comedy Series

Chris Addison – Veep for "Election Night"

- Louis C.K. – Louie for "Sleepover"
- Mike Judge – Silicon Valley for "Binding Arbitration"
- Gail Mancuso – Modern Family for "White Christmas"
- Joey Soloway – Transparent for "Kina Hora"
Miniseries or TV Film

Dee Rees – Bessie

- Angela Bassett – Whitney
- Laurie Collyer – The Secret Life of Marilyn Monroe
- Paul Haggis – Show Me a Hero
- Kenny Leon and Matthew Diamond – The Wiz Live!
Variety/Talk/News/Sports – Regularly Scheduled Programming

Dave Diomedi – The Tonight Show Starring Jimmy Fallon for "Episode #325"

- Paul G. Casey – Real Time with Bill Maher for "#1334"
- Ryan McFaul and Amy Schumer – Inside Amy Schumer for "12 Angry Men"
- Chuck O'Neil – The Daily Show with John Stewart for "Episode #20142"
- Don Roy King – Saturday Night Live for "Host Tracy Morgan/Musical Guest Demi Lovato"
Variety/Talk/News/Sports – Specials

Don Roy King – Saturday Night Live 40th Anniversary Special

- Sofia Coppola – A Very Murray Christmas
- Hamish Hamilton – The 87th Annual Academy Awards
- Beth McCarthy-Miller – Adele Live in New York City
- Chris Rock – Amy Schumer: Live at the Apollo
Reality Programs

Adam Vetri – Steve Austin's Broken Skull Challenge for "Gods of War"

- Brady Connell – The Great Christmas Light Fight for "Episode 304"
- Ken Fuchs – Shark Tank for "702"
- Steve Hryniewicz – Cutthroat Kitchen for "Superstar Sabotage Finale: It's Raining Ramen"
- Bertram van Munster – The Amazing Race for "Bring the Fun, Baby!"
Children's Programs

Kenny Ortega – Descendants

- Paul Hoen – Invisible Sister
- Joey Mazzarino – Sesame Street for "The Cookie Thief"
- Amy Schatz – Saving My Tomorrow for "Part 3"
- Sasie Sealy – Gortimer Gibbon's Life on Normal Street for "Gortimer and the Vengeful Violinist"

=== Commercials ===
Commercials

Andreas Nilsson – Comcast's "Emily's Oz", General Electric's "Time Upon a Once", and Old Spice's "Dad Song"

- Juan Cabral – IKEA's "Monkeys" and Lurpak's "Freestyle"
- Miles Jay – ESPN's "It Can Wait"
- Tom Kuntz – Old Spice's "So It Begins", Heineken's "The Chase", and Clash of Clans' "Revenge"
- Steve Rogers – Nike Golf's "Ripple" and Nike's "Snow Day"

=== Lifetime Achievement in Television ===
- Joe Pytka

=== Frank Capra Achievement Award ===
- Mary Rae Thewlis

=== Franklin J. Schaffner Achievement Award ===
- Tom McDermott
