= This Girl Can =

Campaign by Sport England

The This Girl Can campaign was developed by Sport England to promote sport amongst women. The first TV ad was aired on 12 January 2015. It was accompanied by cinema, outdoor, and social media advertising, which included a Twitter campaign using the hashtag #thisgirlcan. The campaign was created by agency FCB Inferno and the first television adverts were directed by Australian director Kim Gehrig and won multiple awards. The campaign celebrated its fifth birthday with a new campaign in January 2020.It was to help women any shape or size to do sport and feel happy .

== Overview ==
The campaign was created as a response to Sport England's Active People Survey, which reported that in 2014 there were two million fewer women participating in sports than men, despite over 75% of women aged 14–40 saying that they would like to exercise more. Based on the responses to the Active People Survey, women's lower level participation was due to fear of judgement.

A 90-second advertisement was constructed to show everyday women of different ages, body types and ability levels enjoying different sports. Airing on TV and online, the seven women who appeared in the ad were chosen after Sport England toured the UK visiting dance classes, football games and boxing clubs, speaking to as many women as possible to select exercise-related stories. These stories were displayed on the campaign's website in order to generate further conversation about women in recreational sports.

The ad used Missy Elliott's "Get Ur Freak On" as a soundtrack. It was the first time Elliot licensed her music for commercial use.

== Reception ==
The ad has faced some criticism stating that the use of the word "girl" can be demeaning to older women, alongside the issue of objectifying female bodies, with critics noting that "the new sexy" remains based on slenderness, merely adding "sweaty." However, the main response to the campaign has been positive. In addition to featuring women of different sizes, the advertisements refrained from the use of PhotoShop.

The hashtag #thisgirlcan was trending at number 3 in the UK on the first day of airing, and the YouTube video of the ad has had over 400,000 views since it was aired on 23 January 2015. This evidence supports the theory that in most cases, progressive portrayals of women create higher engagement levels with the brand, generating high levels of success. In addition, there was a high level of engagement offline in the forms of collaborations with sports clubs taking part in charity events and selling active wear.

== Results ==
Alongside the high engagement levels, the campaign also had measurable effects on the sport habits of women. It was credited with inspiring 148,700 more women aged 16 and over to take part in sport for at least half an hour each week between April and September 2015.

By the end of 2016, the gender gap between men and women who exercise regularly narrowed from 1.78 million to 1.73 million in the UK, a number which was reported to decrease to 1.3 million by January 2017. All together the campaign is stated to have persuaded 1.6 million women to start exercising, while 2.8 million women said that they have become more active as a result of the campaign.

The campaign has been rewarded with numerous awards, including several Cannes Lions.

=== Awards ===
- Women's Sport Trust #BeAGameChanger Awards: 'Inspiring Participation
- Cannes: The 'Glass Lion: The Lion for Change'
- Cannes: Gold Lions Health for Best Integrated Campaign
- Cannes: Gold Lions Health for Best Film
- Cannes: United Nations Foundation Grand Prix for Good
- Campaign Big Awards: Silver in Public Service
- British Arrows: Silver Arrow for Editing
- British Arrows: Silver for Best Use of Recorded Music
- The Drum Creative Out of Home Awards: Digital - Use of Mobile

== This Girl Can: Phenomenal Woman ==
This Girl Can: Phenomenal Woman is the second wave of ads created by the Sport England, building on the theme of the previous This Girl Can campaign. The first TV ad was released on 24 February 2017, with out-of-home and digital activity starting earlier, in January 2017. The ads are set to a soundtrack blended with the 1978 poem, Phenomenal Woman, by Maya Angelou.

The campaign used everyday women to convey its message; however, the target audience expanded to include women of all ages. The campaign also addressed the issue of stopping and then starting exercise, and provided information about circumstances under which exercise might be seen as too difficult, such as during pregnancy. As a response to some of the previous criticism the campaign received regarding the objectification of the female body, the Phenomenal Woman campaign includes a wider display of body "issues" such as cellulite and wrinkles.
