= The Best Men Can Be =

Controversial Gillette advert campaign

- Video thumbnail for the first short film
- Client: Gillette
- Language: English
- Directed by: Kim Gehrig
- Country: International
- Official website: gillette.com

"The Best Men Can Be" was a corporate social responsibility advertising campaign from the safety razor and personal care brand Gillette of Procter & Gamble. The campaign launched on January 13, 2019, with the digital release of a short film entitled We Believe: The Best Men Can Be.

The campaign title is a play upon a notable past Gillette ad slogan "The Best a Man Can Get", which dates back to the 1980s. The Best Men Can Be was a reproach against negative male behavior, including bullying, sexism, sexual misconduct, and toxic masculinity. The campaign includes a three-year commitment by Gillette to make donations to organizations that "[help men] achieve their personal best".

The initial short film was the subject of controversy. While it was praised by many, such as Bernice King, and defended by others, such as Mona Charen, it was received negatively, notably by conservative leaning individuals, becoming one of the most disliked videos on YouTube. The campaign has led to calls to boycott Gillette and Procter & Gamble. A successive campaign, #MyBestSelf, was generally praised for its acknowledgement of the transgender community.

== Synopsis ==
The introductory short film for the campaign, We Believe: The Best Men Can Be, directed by Kim Gehrig, begins by invoking the brand's slogan since 1989, "The Best a Man Can Get", by asking "Is this the best a man can get?" This is followed by scenes demonstrating negative behavior among males, including bullying, sexism, sexual misconduct, and toxic masculinity; acknowledgement of social movements, such as #MeToo; and footage of actor Terry Crews stating during Congressional testimony that "men need to hold other men accountable". The ad continues to explain that "we believe in the best in men: To say the right thing, to act the right way", since "the boys watching today will be the men of tomorrow." As a result, the original slogan is re-worked to reinforce this message, becoming "The Best Men Can Be".

This campaign includes a companion website, and a pledge by Gillette to donate $1 million per-year over the next three years to organizations, such as Boys & Girls Clubs of America, that "[help men] achieve their personal best". In the aforementioned website, Gillette explains the campaign by stating that "as a company that encourages men to be their best, we have a responsibility to make sure we are promoting positive, attainable, inclusive and healthy versions of what it means to be a man."

== Reception ==
Upon its introduction, the advertisement received overwhelming criticism on social media while quickly becoming one of the most disliked videos on YouTube. Gillette was applauded by some for addressing current social issues and promoting positive values among men. Bernice King, daughter of Martin Luther King Jr., described the "We Believe" film as being "pro-humanity" and demonstrating that "character can step up to change conditions". At the same time, the advertisement faced criticism and threats of boycotts from critics who said that it emasculated men, and who disagreed with its message. British journalist and television personality Piers Morgan described the campaign as "a direct consequence of radical feminists" who he said are "driving a war against masculinity".

Regarding their perceived embrace of woke culture and corporate responsibility, Josh Barro of New York magazine compared the ad unfavorably to a recent Nike campaign featuring Colin Kaepernick, arguing that Nike's ad was successful since it was "uplifting rather than accusatory", and consistent with Nike's values as representing "bold action — on and off the field". In regards to Gillette's ad, he said "the viewer is likely to ask: Who is Gillette to tell me this? I just came here for razors. And razors barely even feature in Gillette's new campaign." Barro added that the market for razors was different from that of sporting goods", and that consumers "may be less likely to abandon a product because they feel accused by the brand when their emotional relationship to the brand wasn't the point to begin with."

Writing for the National Review, Mona Charen said that despite criticism to the advertisement coming from other conservatives, and what she described as "undercurrents ... that suggested feminist influence", such as toxic masculinity, she found its imagery to not strike her as "a reproof of masculinity per se but rather as a critique of bullying, boorishness, and sexual misconduct", and argued that "by reflexively rushing to defend men in this context, some conservatives have run smack into an irony. Imagining themselves to be men's champions, they are actually defending behavior, like sexual harassment and bullying, that a generation or two ago conservatives were the ones condemning." Journalist Andrew P. Street expressed a similar argument, considering the negative responses to the ad to be "a living document of how desperately society needs things like the [ad]", and that "if your masculinity is THAT threatened by an ad that says we should be nicer then you're doing masculinity wrong."

Anne Kingston of Maclean's felt that Gillette's parent company Procter & Gamble should have instead focused on addressing gender equality within its board, and pink tax and related gender-based price discrimination, concluding by hoping that "by the time both the boys and girls of today grow up, we'll have exposed and shaved away the pernicious inequities in full display on drugstore shelves. Gillette missed its opportunity. Someone smarter won't." Defending the campaign, Procter & Gamble CEO David S. Taylor stated that "the world would be a better place if my board of directors on down is represented by 50% of the women. We sell our products to more than 50% of the women." The Wall Street Journal cited how the company's board of directors has more than twice as many men as it does women. Marketing Week said the ad backfired on the brand and affected sales metrics. In his video "WOKE BRANDS", YouTuber and cultural critic Harry Brewis argued that the advertisement's intention was in fact to generate controversy as a form of outrage marketing.

A Toluna Highlights survey of 506 respondents revealed that whilst 80% of them liked the ad and 77% felt hopeful about the future after seeing it, only 34% responded that it made them want to purchase Gillette products, suggesting that the positive reception amongst more progressive audience did not necessarily translate into sales.

Critics of the campaign said that the boycott had hurt the company, and this campaign has since been cited as an example of "go woke, go broke".

== #MyBestSelf ==
In May 2019, Gillette released a video on Facebook, as well as Instagram, entitled "First Shave" as part of a follow-up campaign, #MyBestSelf, which features the story of a recently transitioned trans man learning to shave from his father. The ad modified the Gillette slogan, this time by making it inclusive of gender identity. In contrast to "We Believe", the advertisement was generally praised for its acknowledgement of the transgender community.

== See also ==
- Corporate social responsibility
- List of most-disliked YouTube videos
- Streaming media
