= Nicolai Fuglsig =

Danish film director and photojournalist

- Born: 1972 (age 53–54); Elsinore, Denmark
- Education: Danish School of Media and Journalism
- Occupations: Advertisement director, film director

Nicolai Fuglsig (Danish pronunciation: [ˈne̝koˌlɑjˀ ˈfuˀlsi]) is a Danish film director and photojournalist.

== Biography ==
He graduated from the Danish School of Journalism. In 1999, his book on an untold nuclear disaster (Techa River pollution by the Mayak plutonium production site) won the ICP Infinity Award in New York City and the World Press Photo First Prize, as well as the Kodak prize for Best Photographer Under 30.

While on assignment as a photographer in the Kosovo War, Fuglsig learned directing as he recorded footage that eventually became a 15-minute documentary, Return of the Exiled. The film was shown on Danish national television and was screened in Danish cinemas. Today, in addition to his commercial career, Fuglsig has a number of high concept movie projects in various stages of production, backed by major studios and independent financiers.

Fuglsig won the Gold Lion in the Cannes Lions International Festival of Creativity in June 2006, and the Grand Prix at the Midsummer Awards in London in July 2006, for his work on a Sony Bravia commercial featuring 250,000 bouncing balls let loose on the largest hill in San Francisco (Filbert and Leavenworth). He had been involved with the Paramount action film Brass Monkey, but the film was never produced. He finally made his American feature film debut in 2018 with the war film 12 Strong. The film is based on Doug Stanton's non-fiction book Horse Soldiers, which tells the story of U.S. Army Special Forces sent to Afghanistan immediately after the September 11 attacks.
