= Miles Jay =

Canadian filmmaker

Miles Jay is a Canadian filmmaker whose work includes Super Bowl commercials and music videos. He won an Emmy Award in 2018 for his work on a Squarespace advertisement featuring actor John Malkovich and was nominated for a Grammy Award for his work on Leon Bridges' "River" music video. He was nominated for Best Commercial Director at the Directors Guild of America Awards in 2016 and 2018.

== Early life ==
He is the son of television director Michael Robison and his mother, who was a set director. His early aspirations were to become an athlete but while still in high school he began to seriously pursue filmmaking as a career by enrolling in a TV production class and spending his downtime reading Final Cut Pro manuals.

== Education ==
He enrolled in Ryerson University's filmmaking program where he made a short film "BLINK" which won the TIFF Student Showcase. A year later he went on to direct 2012's Carly's Cafe, an interactive film intended to help viewers relate to a young autistic girl's experience, Carly Fleischmann. The film was later used by the President of Poland in a presentation to the United Nations to support the Convention of Rights of People with Disabilities.

Jay went onto make a short film which won the Best Student Film at the Toronto International Film Festival and a music video that was short-listed for the Young Director award in Cannes.

He went onto win numerous other awards, including Best Director & Best Film at the Air Canada Film Festival, the Jury Award at the 2015 Tribeca Film Festival for "The Statistical Analysis of Your Failing Relationship." and a Directors Guild of America nomination for Best Commercial Directors in 2016.

== Professional career ==
His commercial projects include spots for Airbnb, Apple, Bose, Budweiser, ESPN, Facebook, Google, Heineken, Major League Baseball, and Samsung. Two of his commercials for Squarespace, which starred John Malkovich, debuted in 2017 during Super Bowl LI.

In 2015, he signed with production company Smuggler for international representation.

A seven-minute music video for Leon Bridges' "River" was nominated for the best music video Grammy Award, though it lost to Beyonce's "Formation". The music video is mostly a fictional interpretation of scenes Jay witnessed while visiting Baltimore in the aftermath of protests over the death of Freddie Gray. In an interview with The Canadian Press he said, "I was much more interested in what people did when they left the riots."

"River" was shot mostly with a Canadian crew, including cinematographer Chayse Irvin, who also worked on Beyonce's Grammy-nominated music film "Lemonade."

== Awards ==
- 2016 Grammy Award Nominee for Leon Bridges "River" video
- 2016 Directors Guild of America Nominee for AT&T
- 2017 Primetime Emmy Award for Outstanding Commercial for Squarespace
- 2017 South by Southwest Grand Jury Prize for Leon Bridges "River" video
- 2018 Directors Guild of America Nominee for Bose and Squarespace
- 2018 Association of Independent Commercial Producers music video award winner for Leon Bridges "River" video
- 2018 Grand Prix for Entertainment at Cannes Lions for Jay-Z's 'Smile' music video
