= Daytime Emmy Award for Outstanding Special Class Directing =

American TV production award

The Daytime Emmy Award for Outstanding Special Class Directing is an Emmy award given for direction in daytime television. Both series and specials are eligible for this category.

== Winners and Nominees ==
Winners in bold

=== Best Individual Director for a Special Program ===
==== 1970s ====
1974

- **Wes Kenney** - The ABC Afternoon Playbreak ("Miss Kline, We Love You") (ABC)
  - Lela Swift - The ABC Afternoon Playbreak ("The Gift of Terror") (ABC)
  - Burt Brinckerhoff - The ABC Afternoon Playbreak ("The Mask of Love") (ABC)
  - Peter Levin - The ABC Afternoon Playbreak ("The Other Woman") (ABC)

=== Outstanding Individual Director for a Daytime Special Program ===
==== 1970s ====
1975

- **Mort Lachman** - The ABC Afternoon Playbreak ("The Girl Who Couldn't Lose") (ABC)
  - Walter C. Miller - The ABC Afternoon Playbreak ("Can I Save My Children") (ABC)

1976

- **Nick Havinga** - First Ladies Diaries ("Edith Wilson") (NBC)
  - John J. Desmond - First Ladies Diaries ("Martha Washington") (NBC)
  - Ira Cirker - First Ladies Diaries ("Rachel Jackson") (NBC)

=== Special Classification - Individual Achievement ===
==== 1980s ====
1980

- Mike Gargiulo - FYI: For Your Information (ABC)

=== Special Classification of Outstanding Individual Achievement - Directing ===
==== 1980s ====
1981

- Barry Glazer - New American Bandstand 1965 (ABC)
- Mike Gargiulo - FYI: For Your Information (ABC)

1982

- **Alfred R. Kelman** - The Body Human ("The Loving Process - Women") (CBS)
  - Mike Gargiulo - FYI: For Your Information (ABC)
  - Charles A. Bangert and Alfred R. Kelman - The Body Human ("The Loving Process - Men") (CBS)

1983

- Al Rabin - Days of Our Lives (NBC)
- Mike Gargiulo - FYI: For Your Information (ABC)

1984

- Mike Gargiulo - FYI: For Your Information (ABC)

=== Outstanding Achievement in Directing - Special Class ===
==== 1980s ====
1985

- Mike Gargiulo - All-American Thanksgiving Day Parade (CBS)
- Marcia Kuyper Schneider - Christmas at Washington Cathedral (NBC)
- Barry Glazer - New American Bandstand 1965 (ABC)
- Dick Carson - The Merv Griffin Show (SYN)

=== Special Classification of Outstanding Individual Achievement - Directors ===
==== 1980s ====
1986

- Mike Gargiulo - All-American Thanksgiving Day Parade (CBS)
- Randolph Wands - Chagall's Journey (NBC)
- Bruce Minnix - America's Musical Theater ("The Cradle Will Rock") (PBS)
- Richard Gottlieb - The People's Court (SYN)

1987

- **Dick Schneider** - Macy's Thanksgiving Day Parade (NBC)
  - Mike Gargiulo - All-American Thanksgiving Day Parade (CBS)
  - Joel Aronowitz - CBS Cotton Bowl Parade (CBS)
  - Joseph Behar - Superior Court (SYN)
  - Alan Skog - The Damnation of Faust (PBS)

1988

- **Dick Schneider** - Macy's Thanksgiving Day Parade (NBC)
- **Kirk Browning** - Un ballo in maschera (PBS)
  - Arthur Forrest - Tournament of Roses Parade (NBC)
  - Mike Gargiulo - All-American Thanksgiving Day Parade (CBS)
  - Richard Gottlieb - The People's Court (SYN)

=== Special Class Directing ===
==== 1980s ====
1989

- Sandy Smolan - ABC Afterschool Specials ("Taking a Stand") (ABC)
- Ron Underwood, John Clark Matthews - ABC Weekend Specials ("Runaway Ralph") (ABC)
- Jesús Salvador Treviño - CBS Schoolbreak Special ("Gangs") (CBS)
- Michael Gargiulo - All-American Thanksgiving Parade (CBS)
- Joel Aronowitz - CBS Cotton Bowl Parade (CBS)
- Dick Schneider - Macy's Thanksgiving Day Parade (NBC)

=== Outstanding Directing - Special Class ===
==== 1990s ====
1990

- **Victoria Hochberg** - Sweet 15 (PBS)
  - Diane Keaton - CBS Schoolbreak Special ("The Girl with the Crazy Brother") (CBS)
  - Dick Schneider - Macy's Thanksgiving Day Parade (NBC)
  - Helen Whitney - ABC Afterschool Specials ("A Town's Revenge") (ABC)
  - Jerry Evans and Martin Pasetta - Trial by Jury (SYN)

1991

- **Kristoffer Tabori** - ABC Afterschool Specials ("The Perfect Date") (ABC)
  - Piers Haggard - Back Home (Disney Channel)
  - Daniel Taplitz - Lifestories: Families in Crisis ("Gunplay: The Last Day in the Life of Brian Darling") (HBO)
  - Thomas G. Smith and John Clark Matthews - ABC Weekend Specials ("Ralph S. Mouse") (ABC)
  - Al Waxman - CBS Schoolbreak Special ("Maggie's Secret") (CBS)
  - Timothy Regler - The People's Court (SYN)
  - Dick Schneider - Macy's Thanksgiving Day Parade (NBC)
  - Bernie Hargis - Winds of Freedom (ABC)
  - Susan Rohrer - CBS Schoolbreak Special ("The Emancipation of Lizzie Stern") (CBS)

1992

- **Dick Schneider** - Macy's Thanksgiving Day Parade (NBC)
  - Oren Rudavsky - Saying Kaddish (ABC)
  - Kirk Bergstrom and Kit Thomas - Spaceship Earth: Our Global Environment (Disney Channel)
  - Mike Gargiulo - All-American Thanksgiving Day Parade (CBS)

1993

- **Mike Gargiulo** - All-American Thanksgiving Day Parade (CBS)
- **Russell Morash** - The Victory Garden (PBS)
  - Dick Schneider - Macy's Thanksgiving Day Parade (NBC)

1994

- **Bob McKinnon** - Good Morning America (ABC)
  - Dick Schneider - Macy's Thanksgiving Day Parade (NBC)
  - Mike Gargiulo - Tournament of Roses Parade (CBS)

1995

- **Charles Jarrott** - A Promise Kept: The Oksana Baiul Story (CBS)
  - Jay Gleeson, Bob McKinnon, and Dan Glovach - Good Morning America (ABC)
  - Team - Walt Disney World Very Merry Christmas Parade (ABC)
  - Russell Morash - The Victory Garden (PBS)
  - Mike Gargiulo - Tournament of Roses Parade (CBS)
  - Gary Halvorson - Macy's Thanksgiving Day Parade (NBC)

1996

- **Arthur Forrest** - Macy's Thanksgiving Day Parade (NBC)
  - Wes Kenney, Harry Hall, and Jim Eaton - CBS Soap Break (CBS)
  - Russell Morash - The Victory Garden (PBS)
  - Ron de Moraes - Soul Train (SYN)
  - Michael Sergio - Creating The Wizard of Oz on Ice

1997

- **László Pal** - Sailing the World Alone (PBS)
  - Mike Gargiulo - Tournament of Roses Parade (CBS)
  - Joel Aronowitz - Microage Fiesta Bowl Parade (CBS)
  - Russell Morash - The Victory Garden (PBS)
  - Gary Halvorson - Macy's Thanksgiving Day Parade (NBC)

1998

- **Gary Halvorson** and **Alan Carter** - A Magical Walt Disney World Christmas (ABC)
  - Mike Gargiulo - All-American Thanksgiving Day Parade (CBS)
  - Russell Morash - The Victory Garden (PBS)
  - Gary Halvorson - Macy's Thanksgiving Day Parade (NBC)

1999

- **Gary Halvorson** - Macy's Thanksgiving Day Parade (NBC)
  - Arthur Forrest - Tournament of Roses Parade (NBC)
  - Mike Gargiulo - Tournament of Roses Parade (CBS)

=== Outstanding Special Class Directing ===
==== 2000s ====
2000

- **Gary Halvorson** - Macy's Thanksgiving Day Parade (NBC)
  - Mike Gargiulo - Tournament of Roses Parade (CBS)
  - Glenn Weiss - Jerry Lewis MDA Labor Day Telethon (SYN)
  - Jerry Kupcinet - Judge Judy (SYN)
  - Ron de Moraes - Soul Train (ABC)

2001

- **Gary Halvorson** - Macy's Thanksgiving Day Parade (NBC)
  - Tony Gerber - Behind the Screen with John Burke (AMC)
  - Mike Gargiulo - Tournament of Roses Parade (CBS)
  - Debbie Allen - Cool Women (Romance Classics)
  - Arthur Forrest - Tournament of Roses Parade (NBC)

2002

- **Gary Halvorson** - Macy's Thanksgiving Day Parade (NBC)
  - Team - Spyder Games (MTV)
  - Team - Total Request Live (MTV)
  - David Stern - A Prayer for America: Yankee Stadium Memorial (SYN)
  - Mike Gargiulo - Tournament of Roses Parade (CBS)

2003

- **Gary Paben** and **Christopher Lincoln** - Opening Ceremony Salt Lake Paralympic Winter Games (NBC)
  - Joe DeMaio and Liz Patrick - Total Request Live (MTV)
  - Gary Halvorson - Macy's Thanksgiving Day Parade (NBC)
  - Yvonne Gomez - Brian Boitano Skating Spectacular (NBC)
  - Ron de Moraes - Walt Disney World Christmas Day Parade (ABC)

2004

- **Arlene Hazzan Green** - Adoption Stories ("Mackenzie Grace's New Family") (Discovery Channel Health)
  - David Stern - 9/11 Memorial from Ground Zero (SYN)
  - Gary Halvorson - Macy's Thanksgiving Day Parade (NBC)
  - David Stern, Lynn Hermstad, and George Veras - Birth Day Live! (Discovery Channel Health)

2005

- **Gary Halvorson** - Macy's Thanksgiving Day Parade (NBC)
  - David Stern - 9/11 Memorial from Ground Zero (SYN)
  - David Stern, Lynn Hermstad, and Debbie Miller - Birth Day Live! (Discovery Channel Health)
  - Manny Rodriguez - SOAPnet Reveals ABC Soap Secrets (SOAPnet)
  - Ron de Moraes and Jeff Palmer - Walt Disney World Christmas Day Parade (ABC)

2006

- **Gary Halvorson** - Macy's Thanksgiving Day Parade (NBC)
  - David Stern and Annette Jolles - 9/11 Memorial from Ground Zero (SYN)
  - Glenn Weiss - The Thanksgiving Day Parade on CBS (CBS)

2007

- **Gary Halvorson** - Macy's Thanksgiving Day Parade (NBC)
  - Glenn Weiss - The Thanksgiving Day Parade on CBS (CBS)
  - David Stern - 9/11 Memorial from Ground Zero (SYN)

2008

- **Ron de Moraes** - Walt Disney World Christmas Day Parade (ABC)
  - Yvonne Gomez - Brian Boitano Skating Spectacular Starring Barry Manilow (NBC)
  - Beth McCarthy-Miller - Legally Blonde: The Musical (MTV)
  - Gary Halvorson - Macy's Thanksgiving Day Parade (NBC)
  - Glenn Weiss - The Thanksgiving Day Parade on CBS (CBS)

2009

- **Gary Halvorson** - Macy's Thanksgiving Day Parade (NBC)
  - Glenn Weiss - The Thanksgiving Day Parade on CBS (CBS)
  - Connie Simmons and David Dunlop - Landscapes Through Time with David Dunlop (PBS)
  - Ron de Moraes - Walt Disney World Christmas Day Parade (ABC)

==== 2010s ====
2010

- **David McKenzie** - On the Edge: The Poverty Crisis in Africa (FOX Reality)
  - Gary Halvorson - Macy's Thanksgiving Day Parade (NBC)
  - Ron de Moraes - Disney Parks Christmas Day Parade (ABC)
  - Don Mischer - We Are One: The Obama Inaugural Celebration at the Lincoln Memorial (HBO)

2011

- **Ryan Polito** - Disney Parks Christmas Day Parade (ABC)
  - Gary Halvorson - Macy's Thanksgiving Day Parade (NBC)
  - Alan Skog - Live from Lincoln Center ("Baroque Holiday with the Chamber Music Society of Lincoln Center") (PBS)
  - David Vos - New Orleans: Getting Back to Normal (APT)

2012

- **Gary Halvorson** - Macy's Thanksgiving Day Parade (NBC)
  - Ryan Polito - Disney Parks Christmas Day Parade (ABC)
  - Joseph Rosendo - Travelscope (PBS)
  - Kevin Clash - Sesame Street ("All Together Against Hunger") (PBS)

2013

- **Ryan Polito** - Disney Parks Christmas Day Parade (ABC)
  - Gary Halvorson - Macy's Thanksgiving Day Parade (NBC)

2014

- **Anne Fox** - Giada in Paradise (Cooking)
  - Gary Halvorson - Macy's Thanksgiving Day Parade (NBC)
  - Ryan Polito - Disney Parks Christmas Day Parade (ABC)

2015

- **Gary Halvorson** - Macy's Thanksgiving Day Parade (NBC)
  - Alejandra Gonzalez Anaya, Ryan Polito, and Anabel Cantú - Central American Games (ESPN Desportes)
  - Gary Halvorson - Disney Parks Frozen Christmas Celebration (ABC)

2016

- **Bianca Giaever** - Videos 4 U: I Love You (This American Life)
  - Joel Gallen - 30th Independent Spirit Awards (IFC)
  - Team - Baku 2015 European Games Opening Ceremony (Universal Sports)
  - Joseph Rosendo - Digging Into the Future (PBS)
  - Peter DeLuise - R.L. Stine's Monsterville: Cabinet of Souls (Netflix)

2017

- **John Chester** - SuperSoul Shorts ("Maggie the Cow") (OWN)
  - Ron de Moraes - Macy's Thanksgiving Day Parade (NBC)
  - Travis North - Lucky Dog with Brandon McMillan (CBS)
  - Team - The Mind of a Chef ("Potluck Music Special") (YouTube)
  - J.J. Johnson - Odd Squad: The Movie (PBS)

2018

- **Jay Hatcher** - Disney’s Broadway Hits at Royal Albert Hall (Broadway HD)
  - Alison McDonald - An American Girl Story ("Summer Camp, Friends for Life") (Amazon)
  - Katie Elmore Mota and Carlos Reza - East Los High (Hulu)
  - Jonathan Judge - Skyward (Amazon)
  - John Chester - Super Soul Sunday (OWN)

2019

- **Norah Shapiro** - Time for Ilhan (Fuse)
  - Gil Marsden (director) / Brian Scotto (segment director) - The Gymkhana Files (Amazon)
  - Nicolas DeGrazia - Team United - Behind the Scenes: Superheroes (United Airlines/YouTube)
  - Noel Braham - Watchtower (Vimeo)
  - Margarita Jimeno - Working in the Theatre (American Theatre Wing)

==== 2020s ====
2020

- **David McKenzie** - Hate Among Us (Popstar TV)
  - Thomas Backer - Hearts of Heroes (SYN)
  - Lance Acord - A Holiday Reunion
  - Ron de Moraes - Macy's Thanksgiving Day Parade (NBC)
  - Fenton Bailey and Randy Barbato - Stonewall OutLoud (YouTube Originals)
  - John Tomlin - This Old House: 40th Anniversary Special (PBS)
  - Margarita Jimeno - Working in the Theatre (American Theatre Wing)

2021

- **American Music Spotlight** (The Circle)
  - 94th Annual Macy's Thanksgiving Day (NBC)
  - CBS This Morning (CBS)
  - Disney Parks Magical Christmas Day Parade (ABC)
  - Space Launch Live: America Returns to Space (Discovery and Science Channel)
