= 33rd Directors Guild of America Awards =

- Date: March 14, 1981
- Location: The Beverly Hilton, Los Angeles, California
- Country: United States
- Presented by: Directors Guild of America

Highlights
- Best Director Feature Film: Ordinary People – Robert Redford
- Website: https://www.dga.org/Awards/History/1980s/1980.aspx?value=1980

The 33rd Directors Guild of America Awards, honoring the outstanding directorial achievements in film and television in 1980, were presented on March 14, 1981 at the Beverly Hilton. The television nominees were announced on February 10, 1981.

== Winners and nominees ==
=== Film ===
Feature Film

Robert Redford – Ordinary People

- Michael Apted – Coal Miner's Daughter
- David Lynch – The Elephant Man
- Richard Rush – The Stunt Man
- Martin Scorsese – Raging Bull

=== Television ===
Drama Series

Roger Young – Lou Grant for "Lou"

- Irving Moore – Dallas for "House Divided"
- Gene Reynolds – Lou Grant for "Nightside"
Comedy Series

Noam Pitlik – Barney Miller for "Fog"

- Mike Farrell – M*A*S*H for "Death Takes a Holiday"
- Burt Metcalfe – M*A*S*H for "A War of All Seasons"
Musical Variety

Dwight Hemion – IBM Presents Baryshnikov on Broadway

- Don Mischer – Goldie and Liza Together
- George Schaefer – Barry Manilow: One Voice
Documentary

Alfred R. Kelman – The Body Human: The Body Beautiful (Tie)
Perry Miller Adato – Picasso: A Painter's Diary (Tie)

- David Heeley – Fred Astaire: Change Partners and Dance
Actuality

Don Mischer – Kennedy Center Honors

- Marty Pasetta – 52nd Academy Awards
- Brice Weisman – Up Close and Personal
Specials/Movies for TV/Actuality

Jerry London – Shōgun

- Marvin J. Chomsky – Attica
- Robert Collins – Gideon's Trumpet

=== Commercials ===
Commercials

George Gomes – A&W Restaurants' "Dancing", Bell System's "Joey Called", and Sara Lee's "Red Dye"

- Allan Dennis
- Bob Giraldi – Broadway's "Evita" and Miller Lite's "Pool"
- Richard Loew – Breakstone' "Bedtime" and "Mom", and Beauvalle's "Toulouse"
- Gérard Pirès - Dancy vegetables, Findus foods, Samsonite luggage, Wonder batteries

=== D.W. Griffith Award ===
- George Cukor

=== Frank Capra Achievement Award ===
- Francisco Day

=== Honorary Life Member ===
- Joseph L. Mankiewicz
