= America's Thanksgiving Parade =

Annual Thanksgiving parade in Michigan

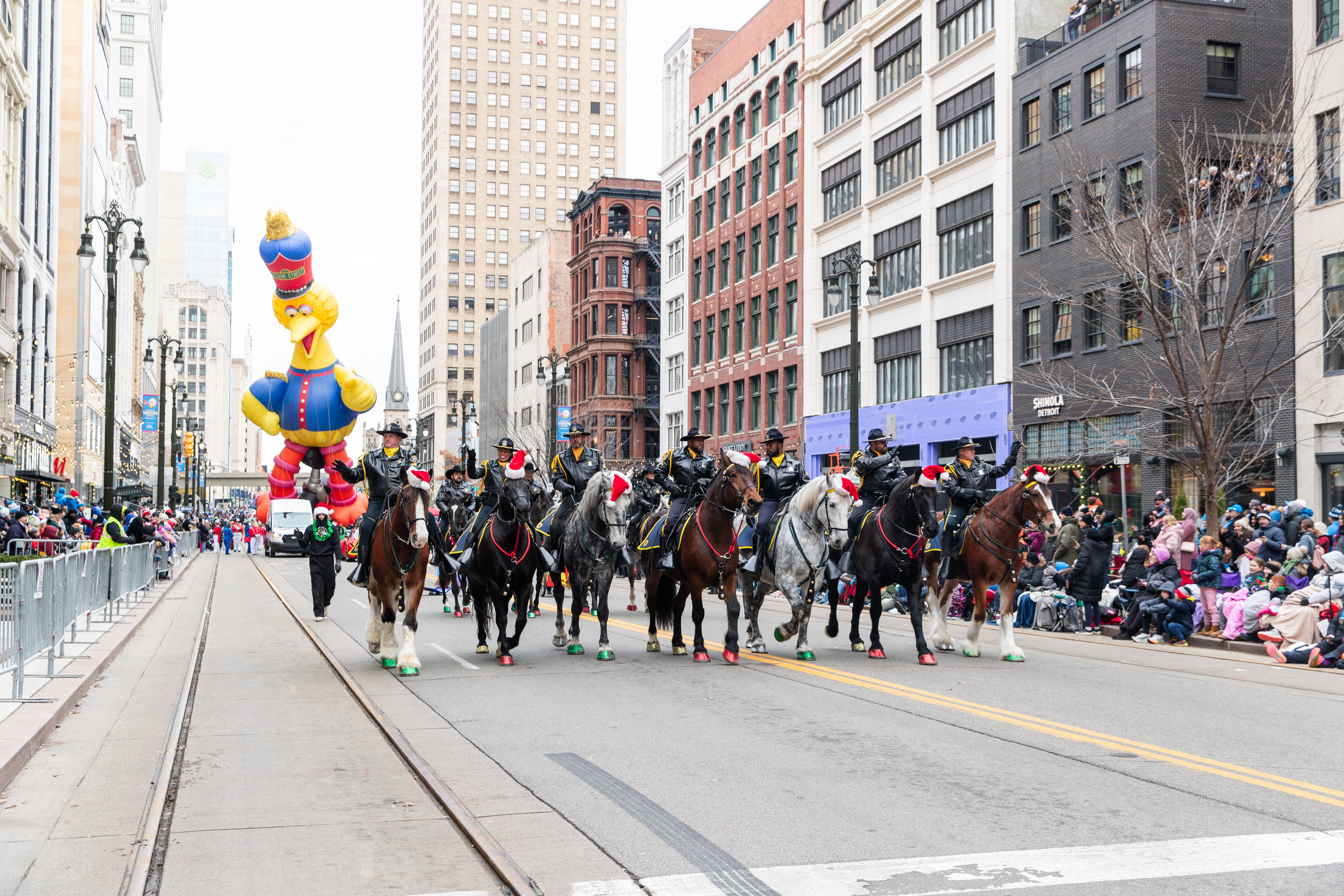
- The 2024 parade
- Genre: Parade
- Date: Thanksgiving Day
- Frequency: Annual
- Locations: Detroit, Michigan, United States
- Years active: 99
- Inaugurated: November 27, 1924
- Most recent: November 27, 2025
- Patron: Michigan Thanksgiving Parade Foundation (since 1982)
- Organiser: The Parade Company
- Website: theparade.org/americas-thanksgiving-parade/parade-info/

America's Thanksgiving Parade (Note: Officially known since 2020 as America's Thanksgiving Parade Presented by Gardner-White, under a sponsorship deal.) is a parade held annually on Thanksgiving in Detroit, Michigan, United States. Started in 1924 by the J. L. Hudson Company, it shares the title for the second-oldest Thanksgiving parade in the United States with the Macy's Thanksgiving Day Parade in New York City, and is four years younger than the 6abc Dunkin' Thanksgiving Day Parade in Philadelphia.

== Overview ==
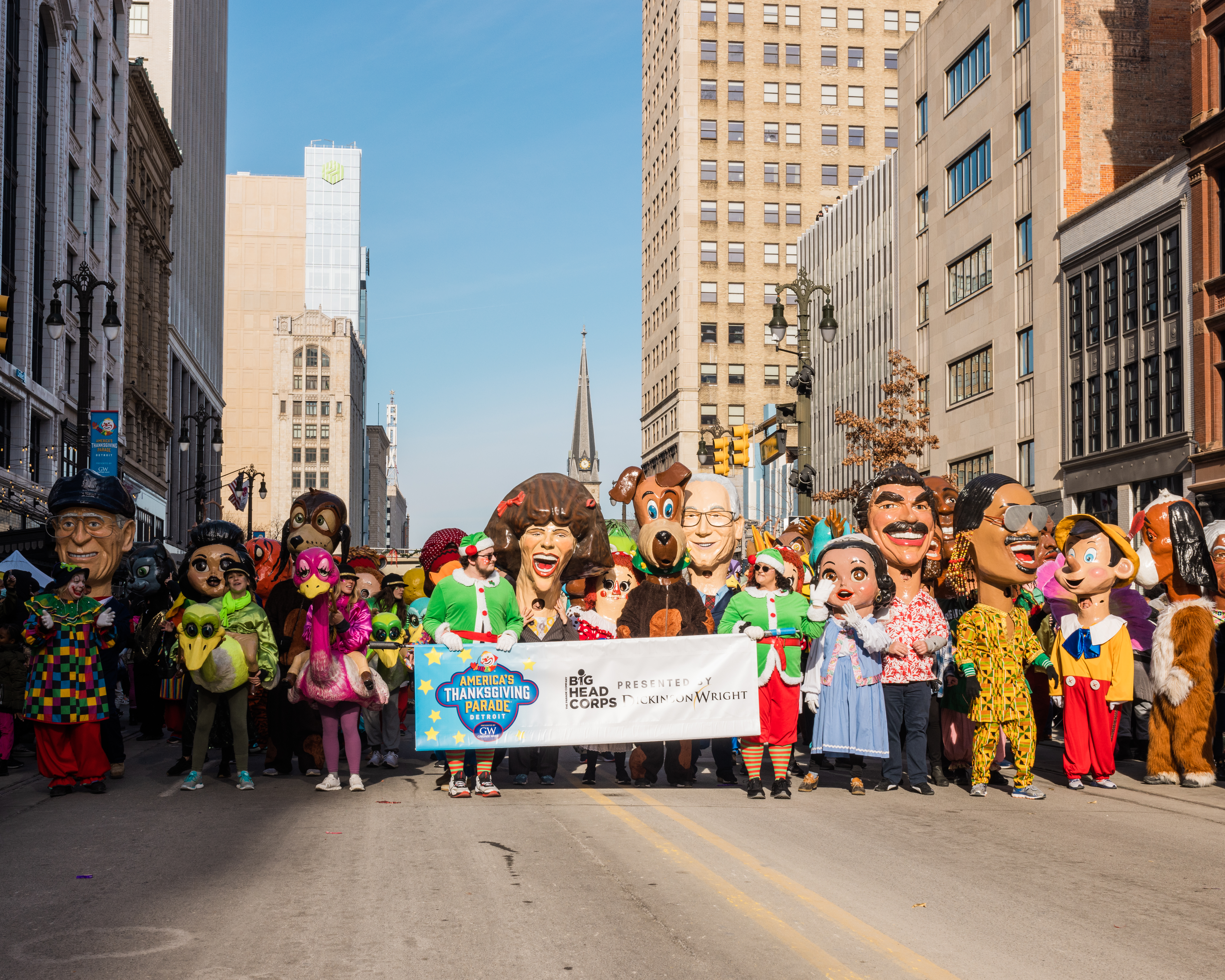
The Big Head Corps in the 2022 parade

America's Thanksgiving Parade features marching bands, large balloons, a variety of floats, celebrity guests, and thousands of marchers. Unique to Detroit's parade are the Big Head Corps, a group of marchers wearing large papier-mâché heads caricaturing well-known figures; and the Distinguished Clown Corps, featuring local corporate executives and community leaders dressed as clowns. More than 4,500 volunteers march in and staff the parade. An actor playing Santa Claus rides in the last float, heralding the arrival of the Christmas season; at the end of the television broadcast, he is traditionally handed the "key to the city" by the mayor of Detroit.

The parade follows Woodward Avenue for its entire length. As of 2025, the parade begins at Kirby Street in Midtown Detroit, and travels southeast to its end at Congress Street in Downtown, a 2.3-mile (3.7 km) route that parade units complete in roughly 90 minutes. The first units step off at 8:45 a.m., and the parade usually ends around noon.

Temporary grandstands are set up along the parade route for paid ticketholders, though the public may watch for free from the sidewalk. As of 2025, the entire parade is televised locally and livestreamed by WDIV, from a broadcast booth near the southern end in downtown Detroit, with the broadcast airing nationally in syndication from 10 to 11 a.m. Radio broadcasts of the parade are carried on WJR and WOMC.

=== Floats ===
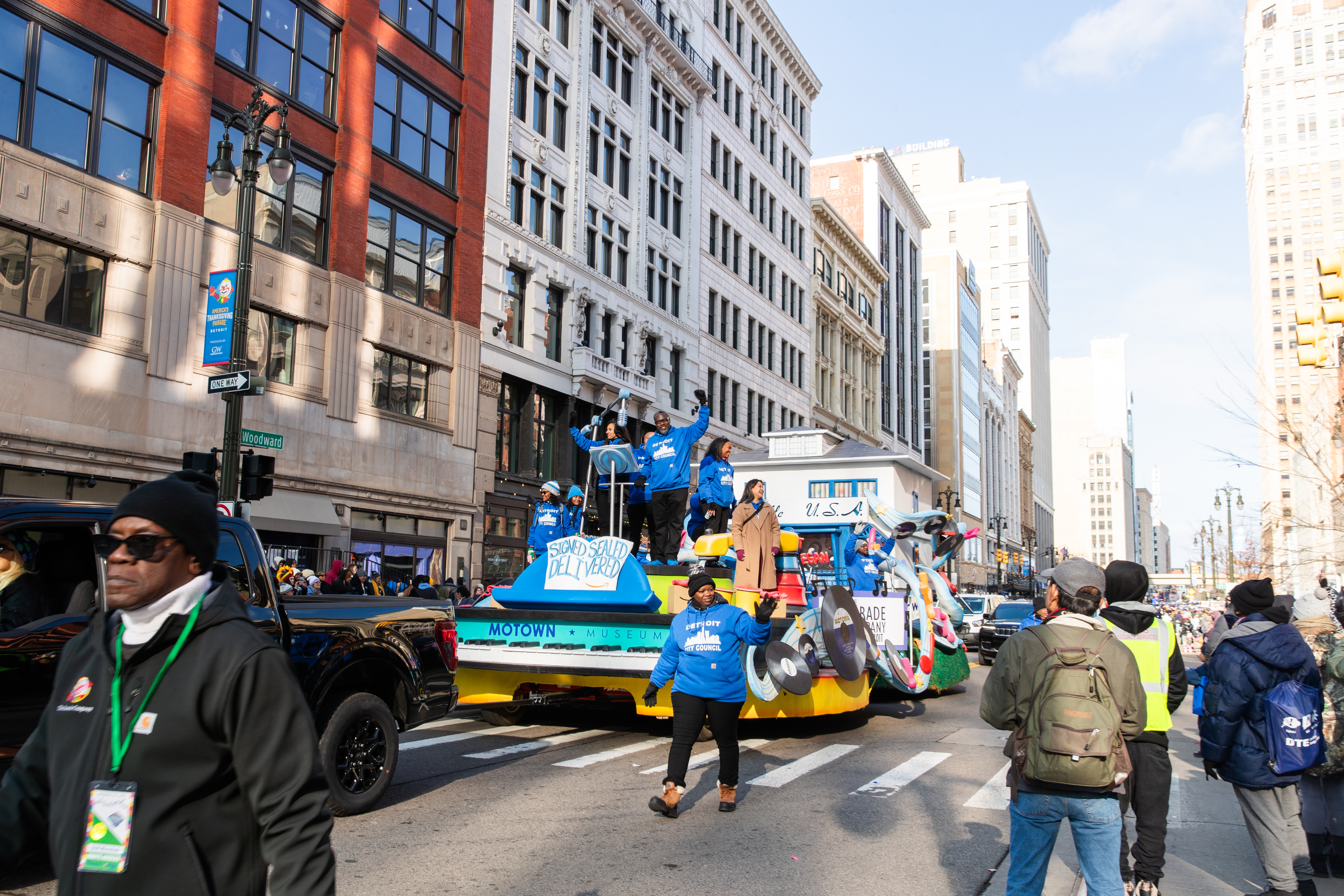
The Detroit City Council float in the 2024 parade, pulled by a Ford F-150

In 2025, the parade included 29 floats, of which 21 returned from prior years' parades; most are commissioned by corporate sponsors or community organizations. All of the floats are hand-built at the Parade Company's studio on the east side of Detroit. Floats taller than 16 feet (4.9 m) are designed to mechanically retract to safely pass under the Detroit People Mover track at Grand Circus Park. As part of the Ford Motor Company's sponsorship of the parade, every float is pulled by a Ford pickup truck, except for the General Motors float, which is pulled by a GMC Sierra.

=== Street closures and setup ===
Woodward Avenue is closed to traffic during the parade, beginning the Wednesday before Thanksgiving to allow for setup. Traffic signals are removed from 20 intersections on Woodward to allow parade floats to pass without colliding. Due to the closure, the QLINE does not operate on Thanksgiving or the preceding Wednesday, and DDOT and SMART bus routes on Woodward are detoured during the parade and setup. Immediately after the parade, crews re-install the signals and sweep the street, allowing Woodward to reopen by 5 p.m. on Thanksgiving Day.

=== Other events ===
Each year, the parade is preceded by the Hob Nobble Gobble, a black-tie fundraiser dinner to support The Parade Company, held on the Friday before Thanksgiving. Since 2010, the annual event has been held at Ford Field. The parade is also preceded by the Turkey Trot, a footrace held prior to the parade on Thanksgiving morning. Following the parade, the Detroit Lions traditionally play an afternoon home game at Ford Field, near the parade's end.

== History ==
Video of the 1924 parade

The parade was originally organized by the Hudson's department store; it was initially proposed in the 1920s by the store's display director, Charles Wendel, after he observed the success of the Eaton's Santa Claus Parade in Toronto. The first edition was held in 1924, and included ten floats and seven marching bands. It also included four marchers wearing large papier-mâché heads, similar to those Wendel observed on a trip to Europe. The following year, the parade grew to include 26 horse-drawn floats, 300 marching Hudson's employees, and a live elephant. By 1939, the parade grew to include over 1,000 marchers.

Following the 1942 parade, many materials used in the floats were recycled for use in the American war effort in World War II; material shortages from the war effort caused the parade to be canceled in 1943 and 1944. Hudson's resumed the event in 1945 and continued sponsorship of the parade until 1979, when the costs became burdensome. It turned the parade over to the Detroit Renaissance Foundation, (Note: Detroit Renaissance Foundation) who produced it for four years. In 1983, Detroit Renaissance transferred control of the parade to the newly created Michigan Thanksgiving Parade Foundation.

In 2013, the naming rights to the parade were purchased by Art Van Furniture, whose founder, Art Van Elslander, had been a longtime financial supporter of the parade. Due to the COVID-19 pandemic, the 2020 parade was held with no crowds. Beginning in 2020, Gardner-White Furniture purchased the naming rights, following Art Van's bankruptcy that year.

The heads are made in Viareggio, Italy, and remain a fixture of the parade to the present.

=== Broadcast history ===
The parade was first broadcast in 1931 on radio station WWJ. In 1959, the parade came to television on local stations WWJ-TV and WXYZ-TV. The WXYZ program was hosted by ventriloquist and puppeteer Shari Lewis and her sock puppet Lamb Chop and carried nationally on the ABC broadcast network. In 1960, the CBS broadcast network began to air portions of the parade and continued to do so for the next 25 parades. After a brief break in the mid-1980s, CBS returned to cover the parade through 2002 as part of its All-American Thanksgiving Day Parade compilation show. Over the years, several other well-known personalities were commentators for the Detroit parades, including John Amos, Ned Beatty, Kathy Garver, Captain Kangaroo host Bob Keeshan, Linda Lavin, Esther Rolle and Andrew Stevens.

After being broadcast on WWJ, later WDIV, for over 20 years, local coverage switched to WXYZ for several years in the 1980s before returning to NBC-affiliate WDIV in the mid-1990s.

=== Route history ===
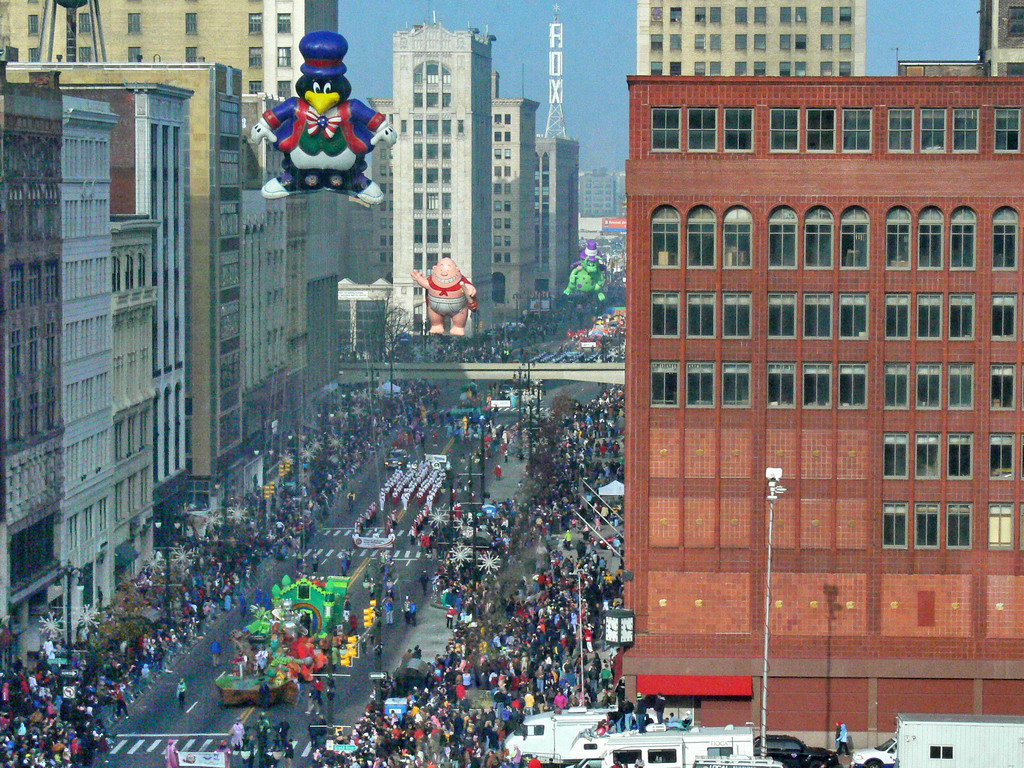
The 2006 parade from near the intersection of Grand River Avenue

The parade has followed its current route since 2013. From 2001 to 2005, it ran from Putnam Street in Midtown to Grand Circus Park downtown. From 2006 to 2012, it followed the original route used in 1924, from Mack Avenue to Congress Street.

For many years, ending with Hudson's withdrawal in 1979, the parade began at Woodward and Putnam near the Detroit Public Library and ended at Hudson's Marquee near Gratiot Avenue, where Santa alighted his sleigh and received the key to the hearts of children of Detroit from the mayor. In 1979, the route was moved several blocks north, beginning at Antoinette Street and ending at Adams Street, near Grand Circus Park. During this period, Santa alighted on the steps of the Detroit Institute of Arts to be welcomed by the mayor, then remounted to travel the remainder of the parade route.

== The Parade Company ==
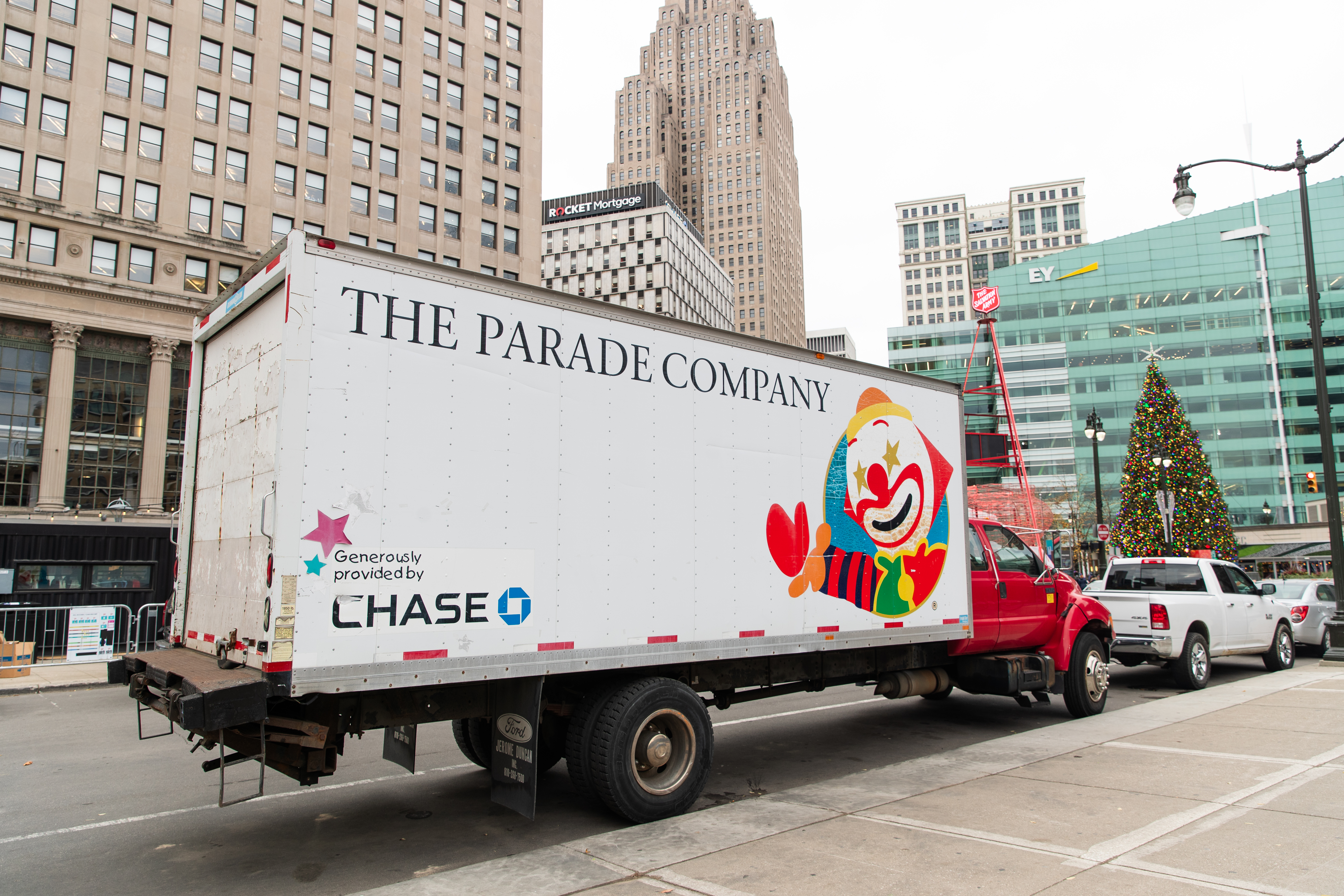
The Parade Company support truck

America's Thanksgiving Parade is produced by The Parade Company, the operating division of the Michigan Thanksgiving Parade Foundation, a 501(c)3 nonprofit organization. The foundation was founded in 1983 to manage, organize and raise funds for the parade; and The Parade Company was formed in 1990 to oversee parade operations. The organization and parade are funded primarily by corporate sponsorships and fundraisers. "America's Thanksgiving Parade" is a registered trademark of the foundation.

In addition to America's Thanksgiving Parade, The Parade Company also programs the Ford Fireworks as part of the annual Windsor-Detroit International Freedom Festival. It also organized victory parades celebrating the Detroit Red Wings' Stanley Cup championships in 1997, 1998, 2002, and 2008, and the Michigan Wolverines' victory in the 1998 Rose Bowl.

== See also ==
- Culture of Detroit
- List of holiday parades
- Macy's Thanksgiving Day Parade
- Toronto Santa Claus Parade
- Adelaide Christmas Pageant
- 6abc Dunkin' Thanksgiving Day Parade
