= Sharon Solomon =

American female ophthalmologist

Sharon D. Solomon is an American professor, retinal surgeon and doctor of ophthalmology. Her work has focused on retinal disease, ophthalmology education, and research, while a practicing physician at Johns Hopkins University School of Medicine's Wilmer Eye Institute. Her discovery of a variance in proteins in the eye tissue between persons with a macular hole and those without, marks the first time in history this had been observed, noted and discussed.

Solomon is a member of the Miller-Coulson Academy of Clinical Excellence at Johns Hopkins.

== Early life and education ==
Solomon was born (March 22, 1970) in Brooklyn, New York to Monica and Edmond Solomon, originally of Grenada (Caribbean Islands). She said she knew she would be a doctor after being intrigued by a television show called "The Body Human".

After graduating from Morristown-Beard high school in New Jersey as valedictorian (1988), she began college as a Harvard University undergrad majoring in Biochemical Sciences. She graduated in 1992. Her medical education began at the University of California, San Francisco, School of Medicine where she obtained her M.D. in 1996 and became a member of Alpha Omega Alpha. After an internship at Stanford, she returned to UCSF for a Residency. Solomon became board certified in Ophthalmology by the American Board of Ophthalmology in 2001. She completed her surgical retina fellowship at the Johns Hopkins University School of Medicine's Wilmer Eye Institute.

== Career ==
Since completing her fellowship, Solomon worked as a faculty member at the Johns Hopkins University School of Medicine, first as an assistant professor and later as a full professor (2018) at the Wilmer Eye Institute and is the first African-American to hold that position. She was awarded citations on the House and Senate floors at the Maryland State House in Annapolis - one from Gov. Larry Hogan and another from the Maryland General Assembly (2021). Senator Shirley Nathan-Pulliam introduced Solomon at the ceremony.

She holds an endowed chair, the Katherine M. Graham Professorship of Ophthalmology. In 2022, she was inducted into the Indispensable Role of Blacks at Johns Hopkins for contributions, given the title of Role Model for Academic Medicine.

Since 2016, Solomon is a contributing editor for the American Academy of Ophthalmology and conducts (medical) journal peer reviews.

== Clinical trials, case studies and discoveries ==
Solomon discovered a variance in proteins in the eye tissue that were upregulated and downregulated between persons with a macular hole and those without. "Such a finding has never before been described in the scientific literature. The DRCR Retina Network, sponsored by the National Eye Institute/National Institute of Health, is interested in exploring the preliminary findings of Solomon and her colleagues." Solomon is protocol chair and National Principal Investigator of this clinical trial. The study,Vitreous Proteomics In Eyes with a Macular Hole, began in 2020 and is slated to end December 2026. This study is the first research project under the umbrella of the Diabetic Retinopathy Clinical Research Network that is not related to diabetes.

Concurrently Solomon is principle investigator in another case study, Randomized Trial Comparing Immediate versus Deferred Surgery for Symptomatic Epiretinal Membranes. More case studies Solomon contributed to can be found on PubMed.

== Awards ==
| Year | Award | Organization |
|---|---|---|
| 2022 | Role Model for Academic Medicine | Johns Hopkins |
| 2023 | Secretariat Award (Co-chair, Task Force on Disparities in Eye Care) | American Academy of Ophthalmology |

== Professional organizations and memberships ==
Solomon is a member of American Academy of Ophthalmology, American Society of Retina Specialists, and Macula Society. Other memberships include National Medical Association, and the Association for Research in Vision and Ophthalmology, and from college, Alpha Omega Alpha.

== Features and published works ==
Solomon was interviewed on CNN (2009) discussing macular degeneration and advanced treatments to slow and prevent blindness in patients.

In a 2023 WebMD article, "An Expert's Perspective: Geographic Atrophy," she discussed geographic atrophy and its symptoms. Solomon also mentions how to help caretakers and family members understand the illness.

=== Podcasts ===
Solomon was a featured guest in a podcast series, "A Woman's Journey" Solomon discussed the aging eye and related eye diseases, and genetic predisposition. In reference to the eye staying the same size from birth to death, "the eye grows just as the body grows," she said.

Separately, in an episode of the Johns Hopkins Patient Guide to Diabetes podcast, Solomon spoke on the science behind diabetes causing blindness; and, the importance of ophthalmology when caring for people with diseases.

=== Journals ===
Solomon has journal articles in the archives at the American Academy of Ophthalmology. The archives show her contributions in the field of retina, macular degeneration and disease-related eye illnesses; however, one of her writings, available free and online, discussed disparities in eye care for minority populations.

According to Johns Hopkins profile on Solomon, she contributed to 50 articles, 10 conferences, 7 chapters, 4 editorials, 4 reviewed articles, 3 letters and 2 debates.
