= The Face of a Genius =

1966 film

- Directed by: Alfred R. Kelman
- Based on: O'Neill by Arthur Gelb and Barbara Gelb
- Produced by: Alfred R. Kelman
- Narrated by: Jason Robards
- Production company: WBZ-TV
- Distributed by: Westinghouse Broadcasting
- Release date: 1966
- Country: United States
- Language: English

The Face of a Genius is a 1966 American documentary film about Eugene O’Neill, produced by Alfred R. Kelman for WBZ-TV Boston. It was nominated for an Academy Award for Best Documentary Feature, the first time that a film originally produced for television was recognized by the Academy as a nominee for Best Documentary Feature.

== See also ==
- List of American films of 1966
