= Gardner-White Furniture =

Detroit-area furniture chain

Gardner-White Furniture Company Inc.

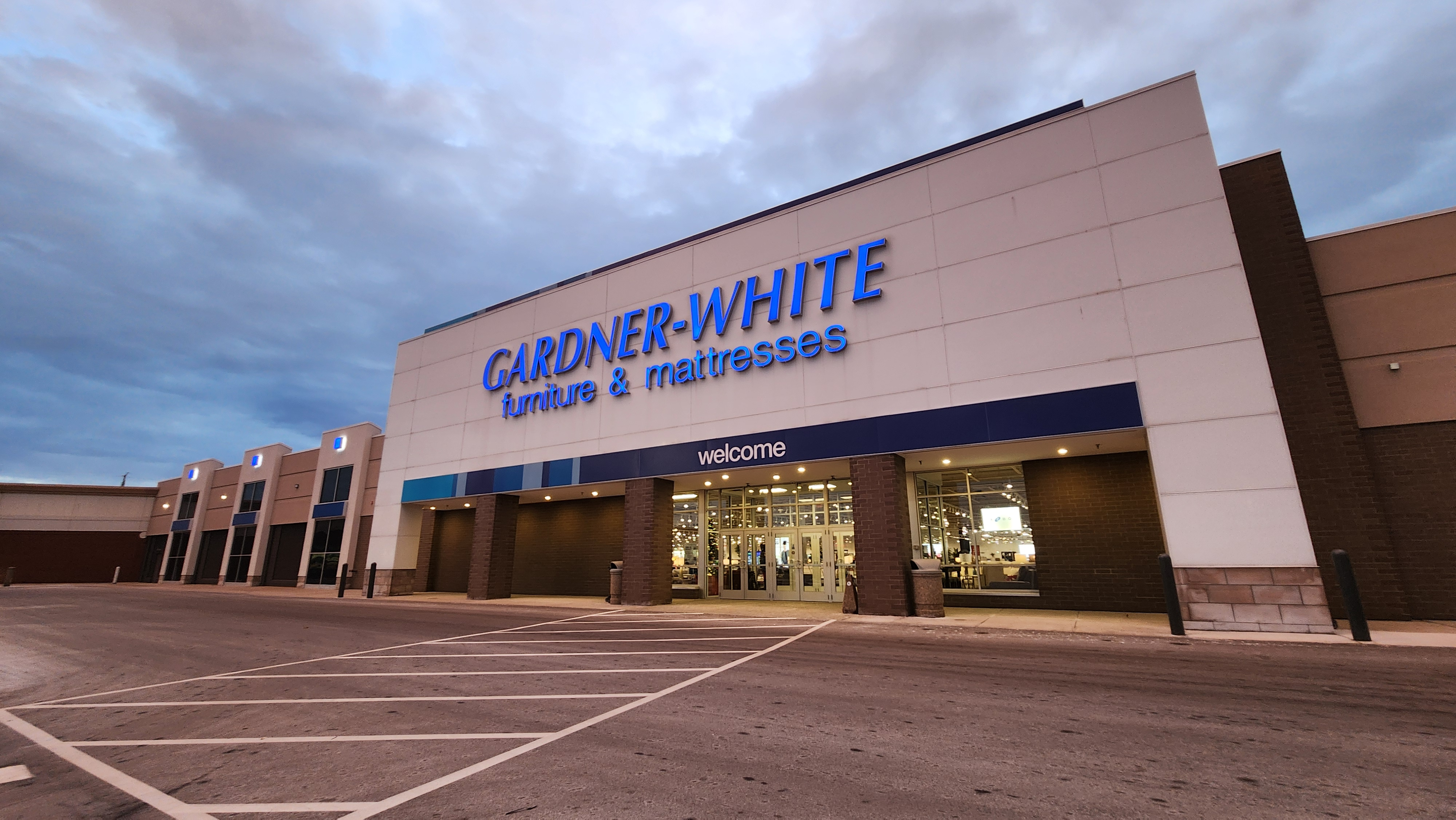
- Type: Private
- Industry: Furniture
- Founded: 1912; 114 years ago
- Founder: John G. Gardner; Eugene Clinton White
- Headquarters: Warren, Michigan, U.S.
- Number of locations: 30 (2026)
- Key people: Steve Tronstein (CEO)
- Revenue: ▲US$15.4 million (2023)
- Number of employees: 800 (2023)
- Website: www.gardner-white.com

Gardner-White Furniture Company Inc. is an American furniture retailer. Founded in 1912, Gardner White Furniture Co. is based in Auburn Hills, Michigan.

== History ==
Gardner-White was founded by Eugene Clinton White and John G. Gardner. Irwin Kahn began working for the family-owned retailer in the mid-1950s and eventually became the second-generation owner and operator.

The company had a single store until 1974 but has since expanded to 11 stores and a warehouse in southeastern Michigan. The company is one of the largest to partner with Best Buy and was the first furniture distributor in Michigan to bundle televisions and furniture together. In 2012, the company moved its corporate office and warehouse from Warren to Auburn Hills, Michigan into what was a Ryder warehouse.

In 2022, Gardner-White moved its headquarters to the former Art Van Furniture headquarters, warehouse and retail complex in Warren, Michigan. The company also maintained its Auburn Hills Distribution Center for same-day delivery services, while using part of the Warren warehouse for additional inventory storage. The move followed a period of expansion in which Gardner-White took over several former Art Van locations.

As of 2026, Gardner-White's store count store count had risen to 30 and its footprint extended into western and northern Michigan, while also establishing a presence in the greater Toledo area.
