= Ron de Moraes =

American television director and producer

- Occupations: Television Director, producer
- Awards: Emmy Award in 2002; Daytime Emmy Award in 2008 and in 2022

Ronald "Ron" de Moraes is an American television director and producer. He has worked on numerous commercials, shows and concerts, and received an Emmy Award for co-directing the 2002 Winter Olympics opening ceremony and 2 Daytime Emmy Awards for his work on the 2007 Disney Parks Christmas Day Parade and for his work on The 95th Annual Macy's Thankgiving Day Parade.

== Career ==
Ron began his career as a boy soprano soloist for the Metropolitan Opera in New York City. After a childhood filled with classical music training as a violinist, pianist and conductor (at the age of fourteen, Ron conducted the Baltimore Symphony Orchestra), he made the transition to television. He began his television career as staff Director/Producer for KGGM Albuquerque, WCPO Cincinnati, WBZ Boston, WNAC Boston, KNBC Los Angeles and the NBC Network. From directing the original Ginsu Knife commercial to the Salt Lake City Winter Olympics Opening Ceremonies, for which he won an Emmy for "Outstanding Directing for a Variety, Music or Comedy Program", Ron's long career in television as a director has been filled with historical, comical and illustrious credits.

=== Television director ===
Ron is perhaps best known for having directed over 5,000 shows of the grounding-breaking entertainment news show Entertainment Tonight for which he was nominated for an Emmy for "Outstanding Individual Achievement, Directing" and the show, twelve times, for "Outstanding Non-Fiction Series, Informational". Though he left "ET" as the director in 1997, he continued as a creative consultant for overall production. Award Shows and Live Events Ron has directed include ABC's Disney Parks Christmas Day Parade for which he won an Emmy for "Outstanding Individual Achievement, Directing"; "Celebrity Apprentice: Live Finales"; "Survivor: The Amazon Finale"; "Screen Actors Guild Awards"; "Academy Awards: Countdown to the Oscars"; "Radio Music Awards"; The Dove Awards; TV Guide Awards; "The Hispanic Heritage Awards"; for which he served as Executive Producer and Director; "Countdown to the Emmys"; "CableACE Awards" and the "Soul Train Music Awards". He also directs many television series include FOX's Million Dollar Money Drop, "Don't Forget The Lyrics!", "The Moment Of Truth" and "Hole In The Wall"; ABC's "Whose Line Is It Anyway?" and "America's Funniest Home Videos"; NBC's "Thank God You're Here"; and the internationally syndicated "Soul Train" for which he was twice nominated for an Emmy for "Outstanding Special-Class Directing".

=== Concerts ===
His extensive resume include Concert Specials: "Eric Clapton Crossroads Festival" for which he was nominated for a Director's Guild Award for "Outstanding Directorial Achievement in Musical Variety"; "In Performance At The White House: A Celebration of Music From The Civil Rights Movement"; Produced and Directed "Woodstock 99"; "Come Together, John Lennon Tribute"; "One Love, Bob Marley Tribute"; "Fashion Rocks"; "Essence Music Festival" and, after 9/11, "Concert for America". Television Concerts include: Celine Dion, Marc Anthony, The Who, Kiss, The Judds, Jewel, Lyle Lovett and The Bay City Rollers. He also started working for the first time directing a Vietnamese concert show called Paris By Night substituting for director Alan Carter. He works on several shows like, "Paris By Night 107: Nguyễn Ngọc Ngạn - 20 Năm Sân Khấu", "Paris By Night 109: 30th Anniversary Celebration", "Paris By Night 110: Phát Lộc Đầu Năm", and "Paris By Night 112: Đong."

== Awards ==
=== Daytime Emmy Awards ===
Ron de Moraes was nominated twice (in 1996 and 2000) for his work on Soul Train. He was also nominated 6 years for his work on the Disney Parks Christmas Day Parade and consequently won the Outstanding Special Class Special Emmy in 2006.

=== Directors Guild of America ===
He was nominated for an Outstanding Directorial Achievement in Musical/Variety DGA award in 2005 for directing the episode of Great Performances about the Crossroads Guitar Festival.

=== Emmy Awards ===
He was nominated in 1989 for directing Entertainment Tonight, in 2010 for In Performance at the White House: A Celebration of Music from the Civil Rights Movement and won the Outstanding Directing for a Variety, Music or Comedy Program award for co-directing the opening ceremony of the 2002 Winter Olympics.

== Notable works ==
=== TV shows ===
- Entertainment Tonight
- Thicke of the Night
- Whose Line Is It Anyway?
- Soul Train
- Don't Forget the Lyrics!
- Match Game (2017 episodes)
- The Bob Hilton Show
- RKO Rock
- Boomtown
- The John Davidson Show

=== Concerts ===
- Woodstock 99
- Great Performances: Crossroads Guitar Festival (2004)
- Fashion Rocks
- Paris By Night

=== Ceremonies ===
- 2002 Salt Lake City Olympics Opening Ceremony
- Disney Parks Christmas Day Parade
- Screen Actors Guild Awards
- Academy Awards: Countdown to the Oscars
- Miss Universe 2004
- Miss America 2010
- Miss America 2011
- Miss USA 2011
- Miss USA 2012
- Miss Universe 2012
- Miss USA 2013
- Miss Universe 2013
- Miss USA 2014
- Macy's Thanksgiving Day Parade
