= Salvage for Victory =

US WWII-era salvage campaign

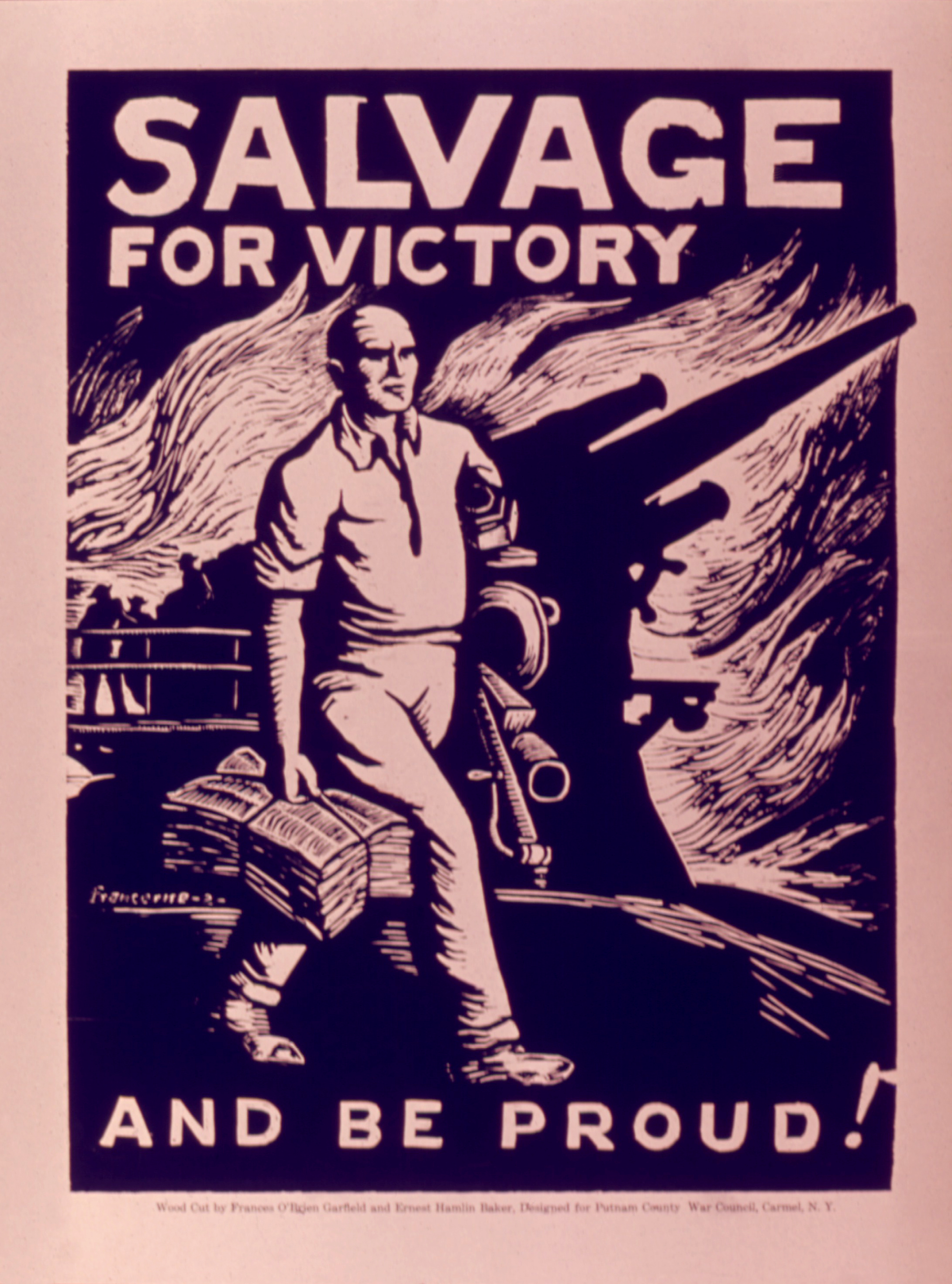
Salvage for Victory program poster by Ernest Hamlin Baker and Frances O'Brien Garfield

The Salvage for Victory campaign was a program launched by the US Federal Government in 1942 to salvage materials for the American war effort in World War II.

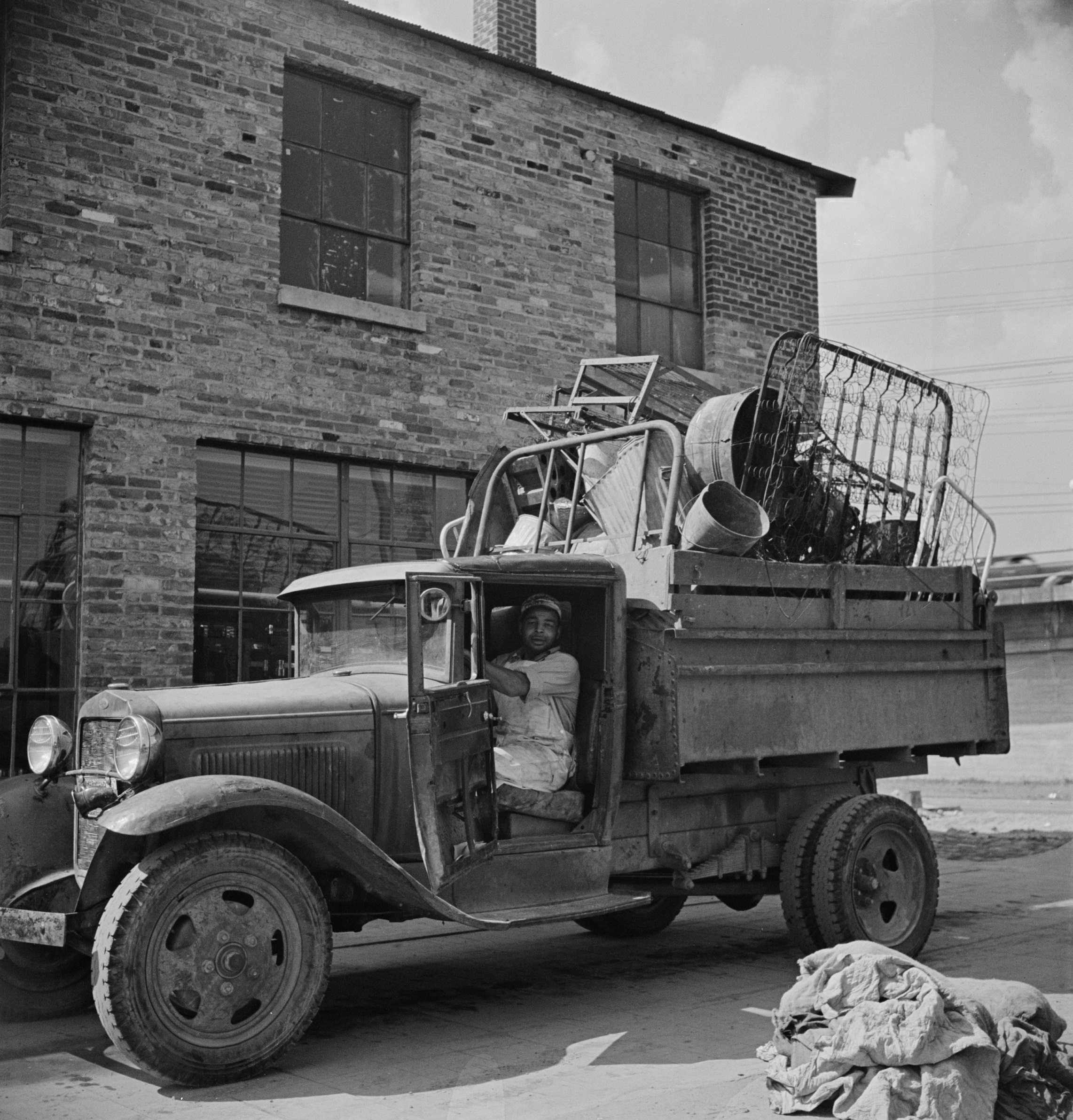
Salvage for Victory campaign. Metal scraps were salvaged for war efforts in WW2

On January 10, 1942, one month after the Japanese attack on Pearl Harbor, the US Office of Production Management sent pledge cards to retail stores asking them to participate in the effort by saving things like waste paper, scrap metal, old rags, and rubber. Later that month, the Bureau of Industrial Conservation of the War Production Board asked all American mayors to salvage the same kinds of materials from municipal dumps and incinerators.

Recycling scrap metal and rubber allowed the government to use those materials to build ships, airplanes, and other needed equipment. This also allowed citizens to contribute to the war effort.

In New York City, the Department of Sanitation began picking up materials collected for the drive outside of homes and apartment buildings at 11:00 am Sunday mornings. The understanding of the process and cooperation of the American people is what will determine the success of this operation to move materials and support war efforts. Later on, these "drives" were later used to showcase the importance of non-economic motivations in politics such as patriotism and a sense of community in wartime. Materials such as metal, wood and rubber were needed for salvage and donated by families nationwide. Rubber, paper, metal, and rags were also collected through salvage drives.

Contributions

"Rationing" the materials was the primary way of conserving war time materials and products. The cooperation by many individuals in the US to the salvage program allowed for a greater available supply in war. Mickey Mouse and Bing Crosby played significant roles in promoting the Salvage for Victory, as they emphasized the importance of the drives and the impact it creates.

Women at home were also able to contribute to some of the programs established to salvage materials. Kitchen fats had just been recognized in 1942 to be useful in making soap. A byproduct during the manufacturing process of filtering/processing fats for soap was glycerine, widely known to make the explosive nitroglycerine. The American Fat Salvage industry actually paid consumers for the fats. Bacon grease, leftover pan juices, gravies, etc. all contributed to the fats being salvaged for their uses in war. 711 million pounds (323,000 tonnes) of fats were collected in a matter of 4 years. The majority coming from civilian homes.

The Salvage for Victory campaign did not end immediately after World War II ended. The need for materials continued as the United States transitioned to a peacetime economy. Government-mandates recycling and salvaging continued until the Office of Paper Control relaxed the Salvage Directorate on March 30, 1950. The campaign was not officially abolished, allowing the core concept of reusing and recycling for government use to continue to be relevant.

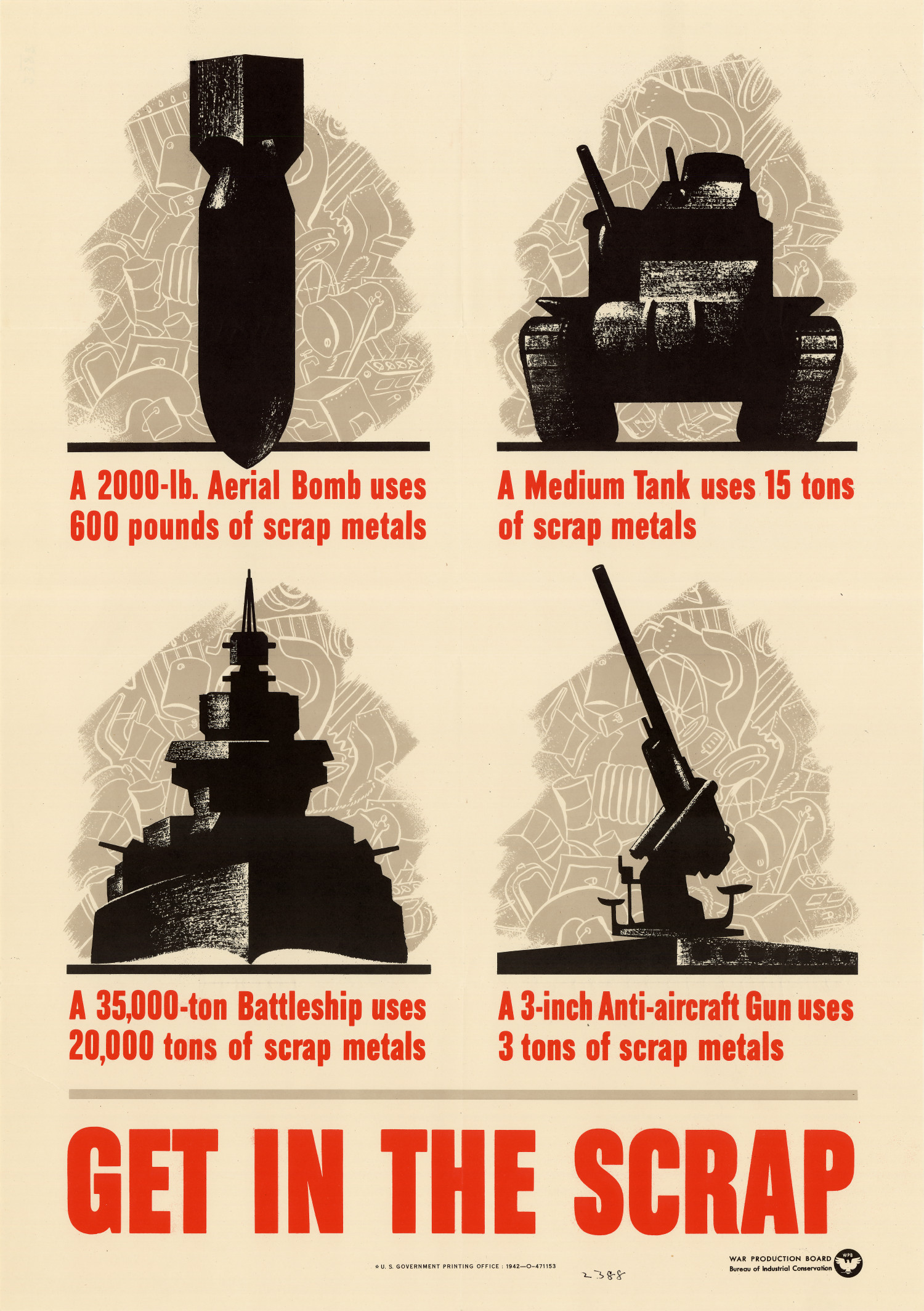
Credit: Collection of the Franklin D. Roosevelt Presidential Library and Museum (MO 2005.13.35.280). “Get In The Scrap.” Poster, Bureau of Industrial Conservation, War Production Board, 1942.

== See also ==
- Scrap
