= Comerica Bank New Year's Parade =

Annual parade in Dallas, Texas, US

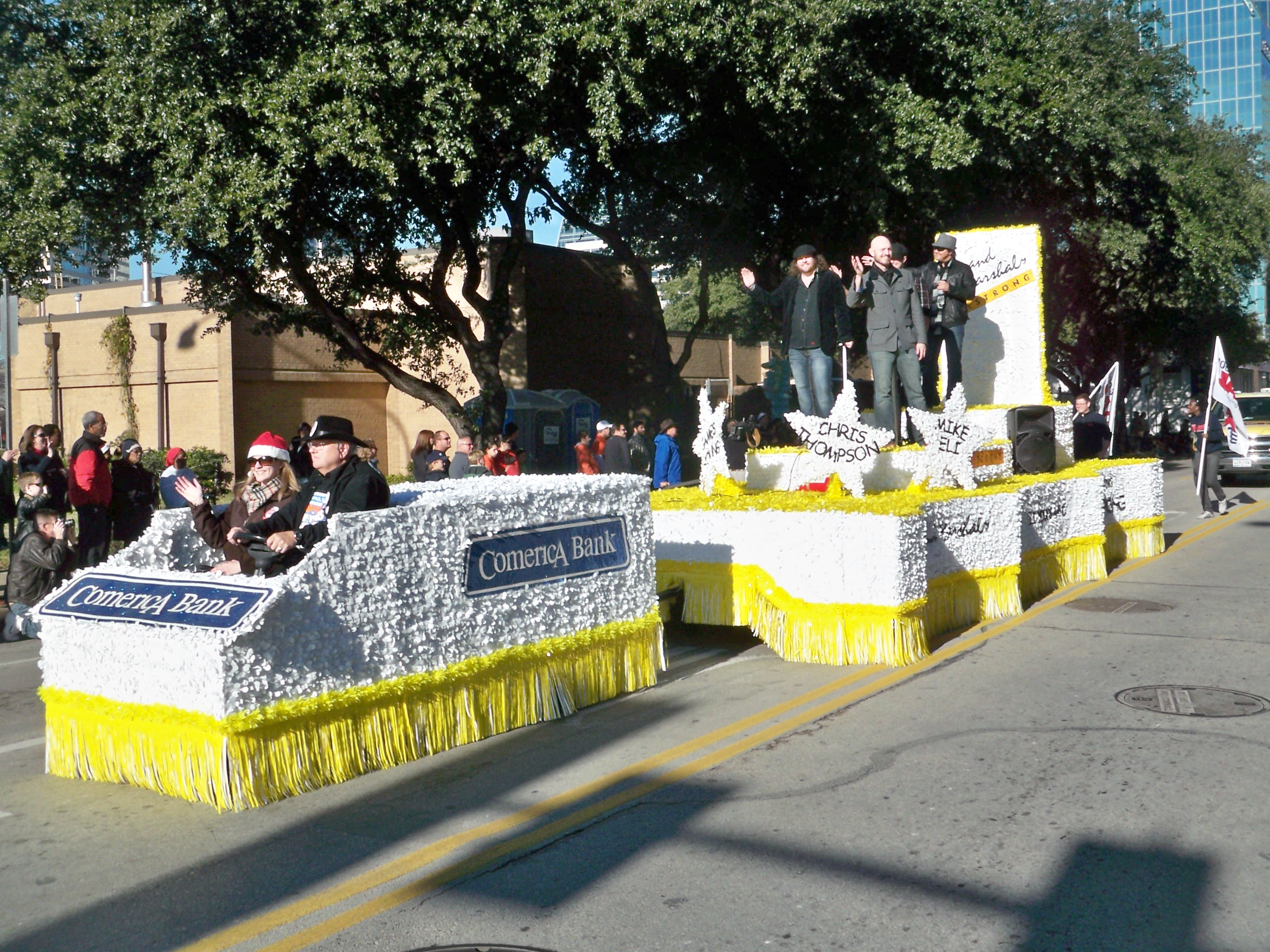
The Eli Young Band was the parade's grand marshal for 2010.

The Comerica Bank New Year's Parade (also known as the Cotton Bowl Parade) was an annual New Year's Day parade held in downtown Dallas, Texas. The parade was sponsored by Comerica Bank, presented by the J. Curtis Sanford Parade Committee, and benefited the Field and Mary Scovell Scholarship Foundation. It was revived in 2007 and was held each year for the AT&T Cotton Bowl Classic. An estimated 100,000 people attended the parade each year. The parade route was 1.5 miles (2.4 km) long, starting in the Dallas Arts District and ending at the American Airlines Center, by Victory Park. It featured about 80 different entries, including about 20 floats and various marching bands, balloons, and other such performances. The parade was followed by pep rallies in the park for each team competing in the Cotton Bowl Classic. Although the game was moved to AT&T Stadium at Arlington, Texas, the 2010 parade was still held in Dallas. The Dallas Convention & Visitors Bureau said that the New Year's Day parade was important to the local economy because it increased the number of people shopping, dining, and staying in hotels during the end of the holiday season.

The 2010 edition of the Comerica Bank New Year's Parade was the final parade to be held. It has not been held since that time, although both the Cotton Bowl Classic and Heart of Dallas Bowl events are still being played, with the Heart of Dallas Bowl at Gerald J. Ford Stadium and the Cotton Bowl at AT&T Stadium.

== History ==
The parade was originally televised on CBS until 1992, when the network decided to stop, and as a result, the event was canceled. The parade was then revived in 2007, when Comerica, which had recently moved its headquarters from Detroit to Dallas, announced its title sponsorship of the event. Originally held on New Year's Eve, the parade started with approximately 60 different entries, but later expanded. All of the parades were organized by the J. Curtis Sanford Parade Committee, a non-profit organization named for J. Curtis Sanford, who founded the Cotton Bowl Classic in 1937 with his own money. In 2008, the "Comerica Bank Vote for the Float" was announced. The program allowed spectators and television viewers to vote for floats designed by middle school students from the Dallas Independent School District in Dallas County. Former Dallas Cowboys running back Emmitt Smith was picked to be the event's first grand marshal in 2007. For the 2010 parade, the Eli Young Band was chosen to be the parade's Grand Marshal. The 2009 Grand Marshal was Betty Sanford, the widow of J. Curtis Sanford. She was chosen because it was the last year the Cotton Bowl Classic would be held in Dallas.
