= Alfred R. Kelman =

American television producer

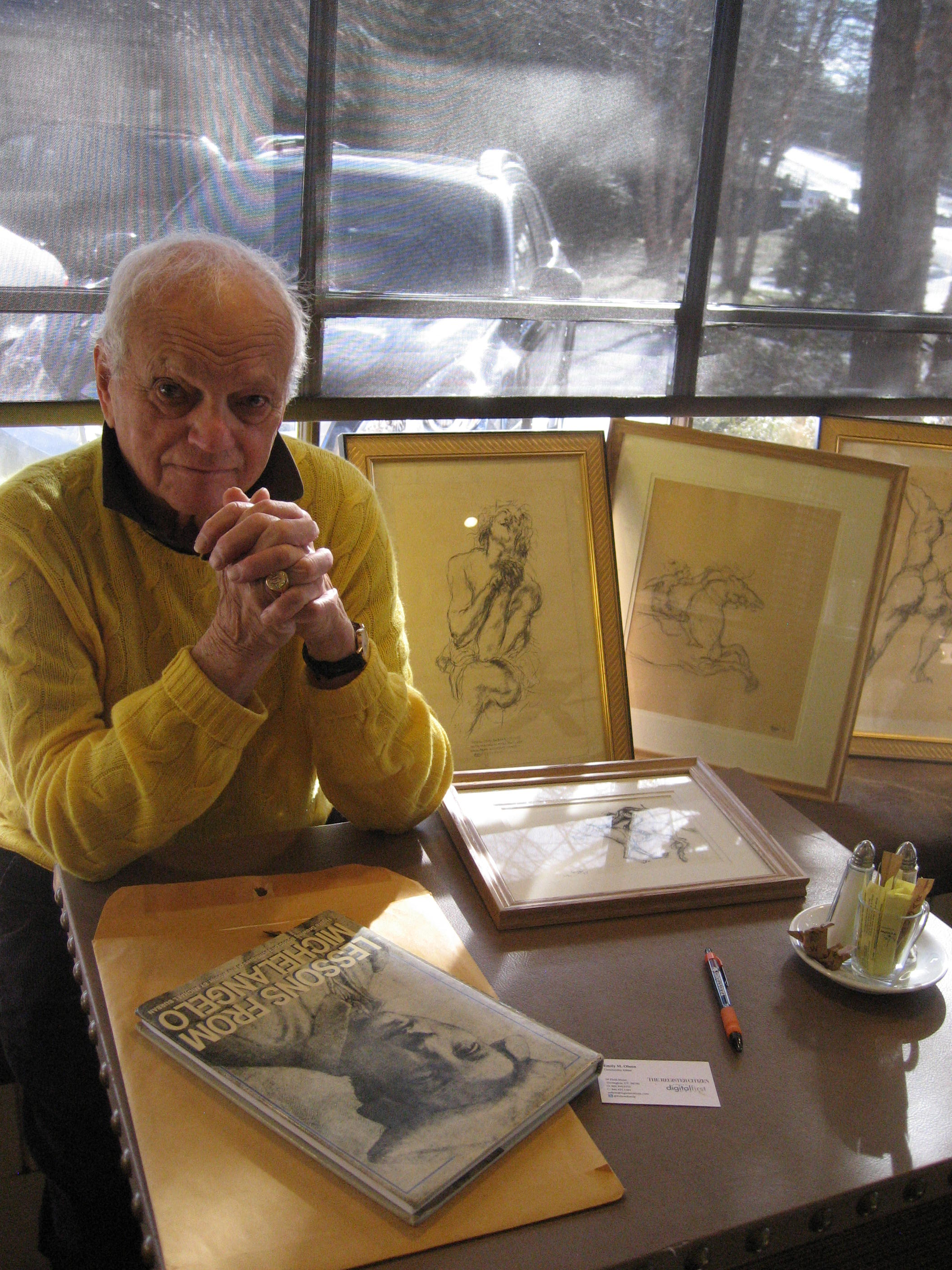
- Kelman in 2016
- Born: May 17, 1936 (age 89); Bronx, New York
- Occupations: Television producer, Television director

Alfred R. Kelman (born May 17, 1936) is an American film and television documentary producer and director, known for his work on The Body Human and the 1984 television adaptation of A Christmas Carol, starring George C. Scott.

Kelman's career commenced in 1962 during the early era of live television as a director for Westinghouse Broadcasting Company, WBZ-TV Boston. In 1966, he received an Academy Award nomination for his documentary The Face of a Genius, a film about the Nobel Prize-winning American playwright Eugene O'Neill. This nomination was historically significant as it was the first time a film originally produced for television was recognized by the Academy of Motion Picture Arts and Sciences in the Best Documentary Feature category.

Kelman is a graduate scholar in mass communications (1959) and studied public opinion at Boston University under the auspices of WGBH, also serving as a senior research fellow at the MIT Center for International Studies. In 1968, he became a principal of Medcom, a publicly traded company pioneering in the dissemination of medical knowledge to physicians and the public. As the producer, director, and co-creator of the groundbreaking CBS documentary series The Body Human (1977), which explored the relationship between biochemistry, medicine, and human behavior, he paved the way for Lifeline, a documentary television series on NBC.

Kelman has won the Directors Guild of America Award for Outstanding Directorial Achievement in Documentary three times and has earned seven Emmy Awards for his work on Lifeline and The Body Human. He is notable for his transition from documentary filmmaking to a 25-year career producing films and miniseries for television.

== Biography ==
A first-generation American born in the Bronx, New York, and raised in Boston, Massachusetts, he is the son of Lawrence and Laura Kelman, Jewish immigrants from Poland. As a teenager in the late 1950s, Kelman was a child of the live television era. Hollywood, as a filmmaking center in the early 1950s, found its audience for movies tilting drastically in the direction of live television drama. Kelman was influenced by the thoughts of comedian Jackie Gleason in a Look magazine article describing the excitement of live television not only as an entertainer, but also the necessity for television directors to emulate the instinctive skills akin to the performance of an athlete. Kelman, though he played high school and college baseball, knew he did not have the makings of a major leaguer, and thus became drawn to a career in live television.

Attending Boston University (1954–1958), he served as the production manager of the college radio station WBUR, a breeding ground for future broadcasters and professional teaching staff in the tradition of famed radio documentary writer and dramatist Norman Corwin. Kelman graduated cum laude and was awarded a graduate scholarship to study communications research for a master's degree. During this time Kelman also began plying his trade at all levels of production in the early days of live black-and-white television, under the guidance of the professionals operating the pioneer educational station WGBH. Kalman's master's thesis, The Role of Television in the 1958 Massachusetts Gubernatorial Campaign, was described by George D. Blackwood, PhD (Boston University Professor of Political Science and Chairman, Citizenship Project), as an innovative contribution to the understanding of the power of this new media to influence public opinion. Kelman continued his study of popular culture and mass communications (1960–1962), holding appointments as a senior research fellow at the MIT Center for International Studies and as an assistant professor at Oregon State University. Kelman served as research director under Title VII of the National Defense Education Act for The Study of New Media authenticating or repudiating the feasibility of statewide televised instruction.

Returning to Boston (1962), Kelman was hired by WBZ-TV Boston as a live television producer-director. As a director of early television, he cut his teeth on Boomtown, a children's show starring authentic cowboy personality Rex Trailer and his sidekick Pancho, played by Richard Kilbride, a multi-talented Boston actor. Boomtown was a two-hour stint every Saturday morning, inclusive of the participation in the studio from dozens of children and guests in attendance of each telecast.

Immediately following the announcement of the assassination of President Kennedy, Kelman spearheaded the national remote coverage of all events emanating from the Kennedy Compound in Hyannis Port, Massachusetts.

After the Selma to Montgomery, Alabama riots (1965) Rev. Dr. Martin Luther King, Jr. (a graduate of Boston University School of Theology) chose Boston for his next rallying cry for racial freedom. In a march stretching over 20 miles through the streets of Greater Boston, crowds estimated in the hundreds of thousands gathered, blacks and whites hand in hand, in racial harmony. Kelman, assigned to produce documentary coverage of this seminal event, was granted a private interview with Dr. King. The Kelman interview formed the heart of the documentary Martin Luther King in Boston.

That year, as a WBZ-TV producer/director as well as head of public affairs programming, Kelman formed a career alliance with a young teaching physician from Harvard Medical School, Robert E. Fuisz, M.D. Fuisz worked closely with Kelman to realize his vision to provide medical information to the public with an early morning series, Medical Knowledge for Man. The format featured Fuisz as a physician, and Kelman produced over 60 half-hour episodes which were distributed across the spectrum of Group W stations.

At that time, Group W, as the U.S. participant in the pioneering documentary series Intertel, selected Kelman to represent the broadcast conglomerate with its partners on an international exchange program between the Canadian Broadcasting Company, Channel 7 Australia and Rediffusion London. There, he was assigned to its historic weekly documentary series, This Week.

While in London, Kelman received word that he had been nominated for the Academy Award for Best Documentary Feature for his production at WBZ-TV Boston (1965), The Face of a Genius, The Life of Eugene O'Neill narrated by Jason Robards. Variety (1966) dubbed it "...a masterful job of welding script, film, stills, and music into a first-rate production."

Upon his return to the United States, Kelman and News Director Edward Fouhy spearheaded Group W's coverage of the 1964 presidential election between Democratic candidate Texas Senator Lyndon Johnson and Republican Senator Barry Goldwater. In association with future Political Scientist Samuel Popkin, then a Ph.D. candidate at the MIT Center for International Studies and the U.S. computer company Control Data Corporation, described in the 1960s as building "...the fastest computers in the world by far," WBZ-TV election coverage was recognized by the industry as a pioneer broadcaster in the earliest use of percentile returns to project winning candidates for public office. Group W then assigned Kelman to work in association with The Brookings Institution and the Operation Government Committee of the US Congress, producing and directing The Government Story, a 40-episode, three-year long project which offered television viewers nationwide an unprecedented behind-the-scenes look at all three branches of the federal government.

And then came the fall during the summer of 1967, NYC. Welcome to the fading world of Scopitone films, a forerunner of music videos. The Scopitone machine, developed in France, all the rage during the early discothèque club era, was basically a 16mm magnetic striped film jukebox projecting images on a big screen adjacent to a dance floor and bar. Kelman directed over 30 titles, one a day for 30 days, produced on location from Coney Island to the Catskills, from Manhattan to Brooklyn, from rooftops to swimming pools, subway stations, bridges, construction sites, penthouses, nightclubs, dance studios... Audio playback synchronization system, hand-held Éclair 16mm, magnetic stripe 16mm stock, e.g., to name a few, The Tokens "The Lion Sleeps At Night," Mamie Van Doren "Lollypop" Lou Monte "Martha, Martha," Billy Daniels "That Old Black Magic," Tommy Edwards "Please Love Me Forever," Ben E. King "There Is A Rose In Spanish Harlem." The project ended in disaster. Films were never released, and therein lies another tale.

Next stop, the burgeoning knowledge industry in 1968 Kelman was a principal in a publicly held corporation (Medcom, Inc.) founded by Robert E Fuisz, M.D., specializing in medical education and allied health personnel training. Kelman's motivational documentaries designed to close the knowledge gap between the practicing physician and the patient remain in circulation: The Hyperactive Child, The Case For Population Control, Ashes to Ashes, Drug of Choice, 3 Times A Day, Aldosterone: Story Of A Hormone, The Transplanters & Christian, Barnard, Schizophrenia. Kelman remained a member of the corporate Board and a key management executive until the sale of Medcom in 1983 to a Fortune 500 company.

In 1976 Fuisz & Kelman partnered with Thomas W. Moore, then President of Tomorrow Entertainment and former president for 12 years during the golden age of ABC-TV, (1958-1970), to form The Tomorrow Entertainment/Medcom Co. Thus was executed, with the blessing of Richard Salant, President of CBS News, the first prime time non-fiction dramatic information series under the aegis of CBS Entertainment, The Body Human. conceived by Thomas W. Moore, Co-Creators Robert E Fuisz, M.D. & Alfred R Kelman, Produced & Directed hand-held R Kelman, and written by Robert E Fuisz, M.D.

Concurrently in 1979, out of experiences from shooting the annual seven-year non-fiction CBS Special The Body Human, grew the beginning of prime time reality television for NBC, Lifeline, 13 hours of real-life medical drama.

In 1982 Fuisz & Kelman partnered with NBC Exec William F Storke, forming Entertainment Partners, and 7 years on in association with Bernard Sofronski CBS Exec in charge of special drama; amounting to a 20-year stretch for Kelman of movies and mini-series for television (see Filmography).

Years later, in 1992/93, Kelman, as an independent producer, became a direct participant in a media-feeding frenzy over the shooting by teenager Amy Fisher of the wife of her adulterous lover. The judge dubbed her "Lethal Lolita" setting bail at $2,000,000. Unable to raise bail, a series of legal entanglements ensued over whether her defense attorney, Eric Naiburg, had the right to sell her story in exchange for bail. Advised by counsel that anyone held on bail had a constitutional right to bail. Kelman and his producing partner of KLM Films, Inc, Philip Levitan of Nashville with the expert assistance of agent Ron Yatter (a former executive with The William Morris Agency) became personal guarantors, and obtained the rights to Amy Fisher's first-hand account of her story, resulting in the NBC movie of the week, Amy Fisher: My Story, the only time in the history of television that all 3 networks, ABC, CBS, NBC aired a motion picture docudrama on the same subject within weeks of one another. The full story of Amy Fisher is excellently depicted as a sociological work by Sheila Weller, author "Amy Fisher: My Story."

Retrospectively, with a career covering over 50 years, the gross budget for Kelman's productions, i.e., money spent above and below the line put on the screen, is estimated in the high range of 8 figures.

During the last few years (2003–09), Kelman was preoccupied with serving in the public sector. A resident of Sagaponack, New York, a 350-year-old hamlet within the municipal jurisdiction of Southampton, New York, at the eastern end of Long Island, found itself under intense pressure from neighboring homeowners to split off a 3-mile stretch of oceanfront to form a privately incorporated village. Kelman, a principal organizer of the successful opposition, was ultimately elected a Trustee under the laws of the State of New York (2005) and dubbed a founding father of the Incorporated Village of Sagaponack, the historic boundaries of the hamlet remaining intact.

Currently, he is at work on a screenplay trilogy based upon autobiographical experiences, "Hayfever, " "At Water's Edge, " and "Swan's Way." Most recently, in March 2013, Kelman's early production "The Face of Genius" Academy Award Nominee Best Documentary Feature in 1965, was honored with a special 35mm screening by the UCLA Festival of Preservation before a live audience at The Billy Wilder Theater Los Angeles including a Q & A session conducted by noted film historian and critic Paul Malcolm. It is now in release as a digitized special edition for students of University Schools of Drama worldwide as well as available for screening at the national Eugene O'Neill Theater Center.

In February 2016, Kelman's pencil drawings were on display, a month-long exhibit at a Washington CT gallery, "A Year of Displaced Energy," culled from 1992/93 while studying at the Art Student League of New York City, under the tutelage of Michael Burban, a Master Teacher of figure drawings and author, "Lessons From The Masters," a classic study of the anatomical beauty of the work of Michelangelo. From November 2016-March 2017, 18 life drawings influenced by and after the Masters of the Renaissance were on exhibit at Lotos, a private New York City club founded in 1870 dedicated to the arts & literature, with Mark Twain among its earliest members.

Recently published 2018 Of Time & The River - Portrait Of A New England Town - Washington Connecticut, a 160-page study in photos and verse delineated by the four seasons.

Kelman was married in 1970 to Janice Marguerite Legg of London, England. Their son, Nic Kelman, is a novelist and screenwriter.

=== Honors ===
- B.S. Boston University, cum laude. WGBH Graduate Scholarship (1958)
- M.S. Boston University, Communications Research (1959)
- Collection for The Study of New Media, American Heritage Center, University of Wyoming (1979)
- Distinguished Alumni Award, School of Public Communication, Boston University (1983)
- Royal Charity Premiere, A Christmas Carol, The Odeon Cinema, Leicester Square, London, in the gracious presence of Her Majesty Queen Elizabeth (1984) - deputy chairman
- Emeritus UK East Sussex & Romney Marsh Foxhounds
- Proclamation of Appreciation, Village of Sagaponack, N.Y. (2009)
- UCLA Festival of Preservation screening of "The Face of Genius" before a live audience
- Billy Wilder Theater, Los Angeles, (2013)
- Gallery Exhibit (2016) Washington Ct, "A Year of Displaced Energy," The Works of Alfred Kelman, Art Student League, NYC, 92/93

== Awards ==
Academy Award Nominee, Best Documentary Feature

The Face of Genius (1966)

Directors Guild of America, Outstanding Directorial Achievement

The Body Human: The Magic Sense (1979) The Body Human: The Body Beautiful (1982) The Body Human: The Journey Within (1984)

Emmy Award

The Body Human, CBS, Outstanding Documentary Achievement The Miracle Months (1977) The Magic Sense (1979) The Body Beautiful (1980) The Bionic Breakthrough (1981) The Loving Process (1983) The Living Code (1983) The Journey Within (1984)

Special Emmy Award

Lifeline NBC (1979)

George Foster Peabody Award

The Body Human: The Red River CBS (1978)

== Producer and Director filmography ==
The Face of Genius (1965) Group W Lifeline NBC 13 episodes (1978–79) The Body Human: CBS The Miracle Months (1977) The Vital Connection (1978) The Red River (1978) The Magic Sense (1979) The Body Beautiful (1980) The Facts for Boys (1980 The Facts for Girls (1980) The Sexes (1979) The Sexes II (1980) Becoming A Woman (1981) Becoming A Man (1981) The Bionic Breakthrough (1981) The Loving Process (1981) The Living Code (1983) The Journey Within (1984)

== Producer filmography ==
To Catch A King (1984 HBO) Robert Wagner and Teri Garr, Directed by Clive Donner ("What's New Pussycat") Written by Roger O Hirson

A Christmas Carol (1984 CBS) George C Scott, Directed by Clive Donner, adapted from the original Charles Dickens story by Broadway Playwright Roger O Hirson ("Pippin")

The Last Days of Patton (1986 CBS) with George C. Scott, Directed by Delbert Mann (Academy Award "Marty")

The Ted Kennedy, Jr. Story (1986 NBC) with Craig T. Nelson and Susan Blakely, Directed by Delbert Mann

A Special Friendship (1987 CBS) with Tracy Pollan and Akosua Busia, Directed by Fielder Cook ("A Big Hand For The Little Lady"1987)

Napoleon & Josephine: A Love Story (1987 ABC) six-hour mini series with Armand Assante and Jacqueline Bisset, Directed by Richard Heffron

The Plot To Kill Hitler (1990 CBS) with Brad Davis Madolyn Smith Ian Richardson, Directed by Lawrence Schiller ("Peter The Great") Director of Photography Freddy Francis (2 time Academy Award winner)

Onassis: The Richest Man In The World (ABC) with Anthony Quinn, Raul Julia, Jane Seymour, Directed by Waris Hussein, Director of Photography Denis Lewiston

Labor of Love: The Arlette Schweitzer Story (1993 CBS) with Ann Jillian, Directed by Jerry London ("Shogun" "Chiefs")

Amy Fisher: My Story (1993 NBC) with Noelle Parker Ed Marinaro, Directed by Bradford May
