= The Body Human =

- Genre: Science
- Country of origin: United States
- Original language: English

Production
- Producers: Robert E. Fuisz; Alfred R. Kelman
- Production company: Tomorrow Entertainment/Medcom Company

Original release
- Network: CBS
- Release: 1977 – 1984

The Body Human is a series of specials produced by Tomorrow Entertainment/Medcom Company and telecast by CBS, between 1977 and 1984. They were produced and directed by Robert E. Fuisz and Alfred R. Kelman, who was nominated for an Academy Award in 1966 for The Face of a Genius. The series concentrated on exploring aspects of the human body, from plastic surgery to sexual function. American actor Alexander Scourby was the narrator. The series was nominated for and won Emmy Awards as well as a Peabody Award.
