= Timeline of the COVID-19 pandemic in Quebec =

Sequence of major events in a virus pandemic

The following is a timeline of the COVID-19 pandemic in the province of Quebec.

== 2020 ==
=== February ===
February 27 – The province of Quebec confirms its first case of COVID-19. The patient is a 41-year-old woman who had returned to Montreal from Iran three days earlier on a flight from Doha, Qatar.

=== March ===
March 3 – Quebec's first COVID-19 patient is transferred to the Jewish General Hospital and released the next day.

March 10 – Montreal declares the city to be in "alert mode." Internal measures to ensure the resilience of services offered to the public are put in place.

March 12 – With 17 cases now confirmed, Premier François Legault announces that the province will ban indoor gatherings of more than 250 people, and that government workers, health care professionals, and teachers returning from international travel will be required to self-isolate for 14 days upon arrival. He also advises residents who are experiencing flu-like symptoms, or who have recently returned from international travel, to self-isolate. Loto-Québec closes the Montreal Casino.

March 13 – Following the announcement of restrictions on public gatherings by Premier Legault, precautionary cancellations of public events and facilities begin to emerge province-wide. Additionally, the Mayor of Montreal, Valérie Plante, announces the closure of 34 public arenas, 45 public libraries, 48 indoor pools, the Montreal Botanical Garden and the Planetarium. François Legault, Premier of Quebec, announces the closure of schools, CEGEPs and universities until March 30.

March 14 – Premier Legault officially declares a public health emergency, lasting at least ten days. This measure grants him powers under the Public Health Act to enforce mitigation measures. He also announces that the province will prohibit visits to hospitals and long-term care facilities. Citizens over the age of 70 should avoid leaving their homes.

March 15 – Premier Legault orders the closure of various recreational and entertainment venues, including, but not limited to, bars, cinemas, gyms, pools, and ski hills. Restaurants were also ordered to reduce their capacity by half and enforce physical distancing. Frustrated by the inaction of the federal government, the public health director and the Mayor of Montreal, Valérie Plante, dispatches employees to Montréal–Trudeau International Airport to advise travellers arriving from international destinations to self-isolate for 14 days.

March 16 – Montreal's Public Health Department dispatches dozens of employees to Montréal-Trudeau Airport to ask travelers to self-isolate for 14 days.

March 19 – Minister of Health and Social Services Danielle McCann suspends orders made by the Court of Quebec that allowed children under the Director of Youth Protection (CDPDJ) to maintain physical contact with their biological parents. On the same day, it was announced that Quebec residents in isolation or quarantine who are not covered by any benefits may apply for $573 per week of financial aid for a maximum of 14 days. The government also announces that it will extend the income tax filing deadline, and inject $2.5 billion into companies suffering liquidity problems due to the pandemic. Quebec citizens are asked not to travel between regions. Physical distancing measures increased residential electricity demand by 2.3% and lowered commercial demand by 3.1% from March 13 to March 19, according to a Hydro-Québec spokesman.

March 20 – The government extends Quebec's public health emergency for at least 10 more days. Indoor gatherings are prohibited and outdoor gatherings are allowed as long as a distance of two metres is kept between participants. The majority of trials at the Municipal Court of Montreal are postponed.

March 21 – The Société des alcools du Québec (SAQ) announces that its stores will begin closing on Sundays.

March 22 – The Quebec government announces the closure of all shopping malls and hair and beauty salons. Grocery stores, pharmacies, and SAQ stores will remain open, as well as stores that are accessible by an exterior entrance. All restaurants must close dining-room service, while take-out service can continue. Schools and daycares are to remain closed until at least May 1.

March 23 – Premier Legault orders the closure of all non-essential businesses beginning at midnight on March 24, until at least April 13. The Service de Police de Montreal (SPVM) declares a state of emergency for an indefinite period of time in order to optimize COVID-19-related interventions.

March 28 – Travel within the province is restricted. Only essential travel into Bas-Saint-Laurent, Abitibi-Témiscamingue, Côte-Nord, Nord-du-Québec, Saguenay-Lac-Saint-Jean, Gaspésie-Îles-de-la-Madeleine, Nunavik, and Terres-Cries-de-la-Baie-James are permitted. Police checkpoints are announced to enforce this measure.

March 29 – The state of emergency is extended.

March 31 – Legault orders all essential businesses (excluding restaurants, gas stations, and dépanneurs) to close on Sundays until further notice in order to provide a day of rest for employees.

=== April ===
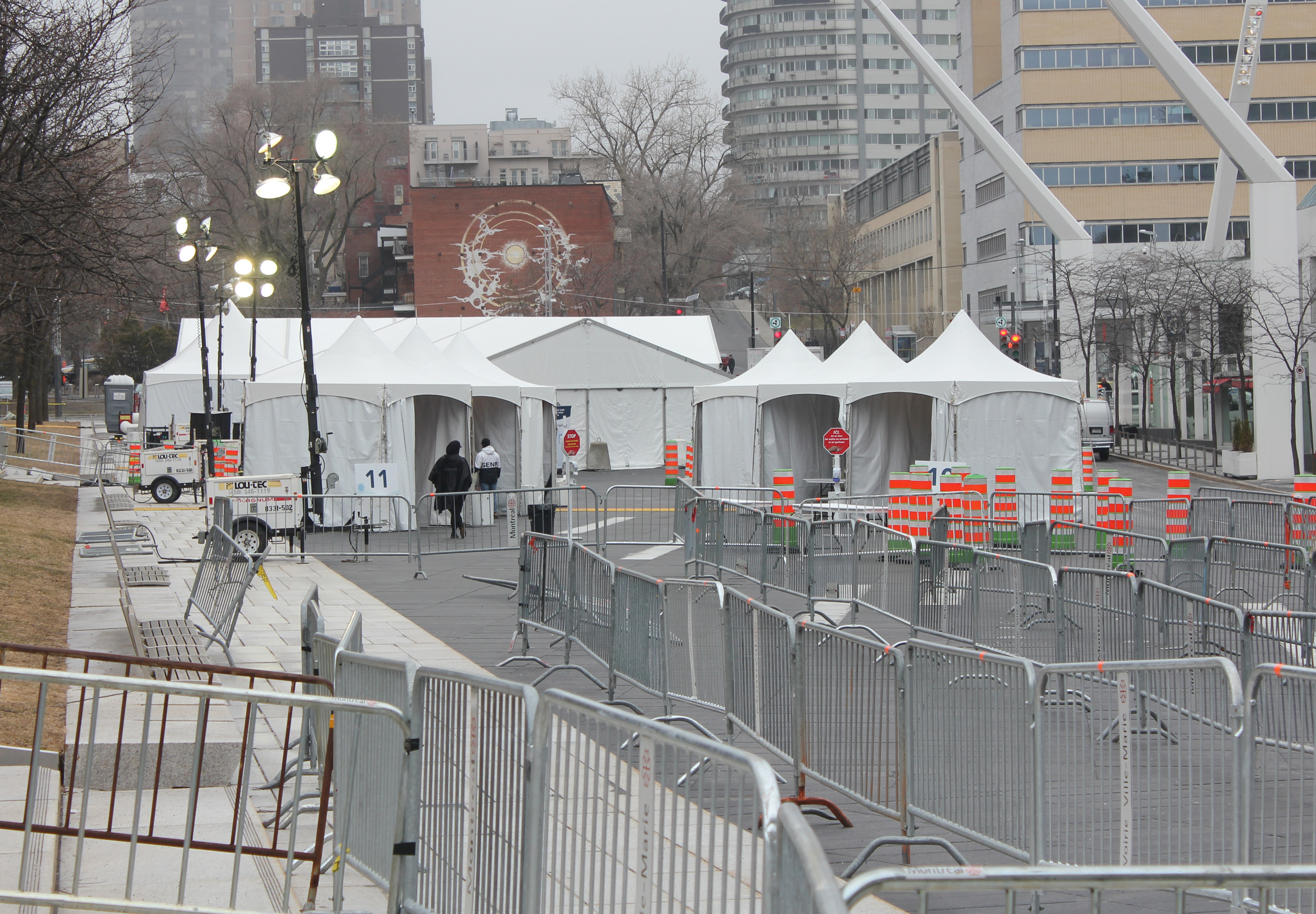
Temporary COVID-19 testing site in Montreal's Quartier des spectacles

April 1 – Intra-provincial travel is further restricted to include non-essential movement in four new regions: Outaouais, the territories and municipalities of Antoine-Labelle and Argenteuil in the Laurentides region, the territories of Autray, Joliette, Matawinie and Montcalm in the Lanaudière region, and l'agglomération de La Tuque in the Mauricie et Centre-du-Québec region.

April 2 – Legault announces that provincial and municipal police officers will enforce emergency measures against individuals and businesses. Individuals and businesses who do not respect the public health directives can be fined $1,000 to $6,000 by the police. Mayor Plante announces a larger police presence in the six major parks of Montreal in order to enforce physical distancing laws. The city also announces the temporary suspension of the annual indexing of it parking meters.

April 4 – The Quebec government grants the national public health director and any health director the authority to order a person to self-isolate for a maximum period of 14 days without a court order if the person does not consent to voluntarily self-isolate.

April 5 – Quebec extends its public health emergency and all associated closures to at least May 4.

April 7 – The state of emergency is extended and the city of Montreal announces the cancellation of all summer festivals and events until July 2. Furthermore, Quebec announces the containment of Notre-Dame-des-Sept-Douleurs in the Bas-Saint-Laurent region, which was then closed off from the rest of the province. No one could leave or enter the region unless they fell within the exception.

Quebec releases a model projecting that the province will see as few as 1,263 to as many as 8,860 deaths from COVID-19 by the end of the month, depending on the epidemic curve.

April 9 – The La Ronde amusement park cancels the 36th edition of its fireworks competition due to the COVID-19 pandemic.

April 10 – The Quebec government announces that all festivals, sporting events and cultural events are cancelled until August 31. During his daily press briefing, François Legault floats the possibility of a return to school before May 4.

April 13 – The province unveils its gradual economic reopening plan. Additionally, Legault announces that residential construction slated for completion by July 31 will be re-classified as an essential service, arguing that the province "[doesn't] want to add a housing crisis on top of the current crisis."

April 15 – The state of emergency is extended until April 24.

April 20 – The lack of unanimity among CAQ MNAs and among the general population forces the government to postpone the initial date of May 4 for a return to class.

April 22 – The state of emergency is extended until April 29. The death rate in Montreal is revealed to be four times higher than that of Toronto.

April 24 – Premier Legault states that "outside of the senior residences, distancing measures are working," and announces plans to unveil strategies for phasing out the province's current restrictions on commerce and reopening schools. He notes that the province will have to ensure that they are able to "restart the economy without restarting the pandemic."

April 27 – The Quebec government announces that preschools and elementary schools outside the Metropolitan Community of Montreal (CMM) can reopen on May 11, preparing a possible return to work for their parents. Meanwhile, secondary schools, CÉGEPS and universities are expected to remain closed until September, i.e. until the start of the next school year.

April 28 – The Quebec government announces that retail stores outside of the Montreal region with exterior operating doors will be allowed to reopen from May 4 onwards. Retail stores within the Montreal region are allowed to reopen a week later on May 11.

April 29 – The Quebec government announces that regional travel restrictions will be lifted on May 4. However, the state of emergency is extended once more.

April 30 – In the two last weeks of April, the Montreal region saw 1,000 weekly deaths from all causes, representing an increase of 196% over the average for previous years. Only Madrid, London and Brussels experienced a larger increase.

=== May ===
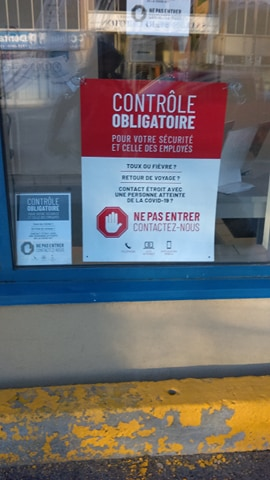
Most grocery stores or pharmacies refused entry to people with COVID-19 symptoms in Montreal

May 3 – As Montrealers experienced two consecutive days of +20 °C (68 °F) weather and began crowding into parks, the city announced the closure of the parking lots at La Fontaine Park, Maisonneuve Park, Jarry Park, Frédéric-Back Park, and the Île de la Visitation nature park, effective May 3, 2020.

May 4 – Premier Legault postpones the reopening of businesses in Montreal to May 11. In an interview with the Téléjournal, Mayor Plante says she has already ordered 50,000 masks for the population. In addition, the STM announces that 6 of their buses will be transformed into mobile testing clinics.

May 5 – Patients with COVID-19 in the Greater Montreal Region begin being transferred to hospitals outside the city in order to relieve some pressure on the Montreal health system. The STM announces that it will start installing plexiglass panels to protect its drivers.

May 6 – The state of emergency is extended until May 13.

May 7 – The Quebec government postpones the reopening of shops, schools and daycare services in the greater Montreal region to May 25. The federal government confirms that 1,020 soldiers of the Canadian Army have been deployed to 20 different long-term care homes, all in the greater Montreal area. The City of Montreal announces a grant of $5 million to help local merchants, cultural enterprises, and social economy businesses.

In their second report on the evolution of the pandemic in Quebec, epidemiologists predict that the current deconfinement plan for the Greater Montreal region could result in 150 deaths per day by July 2020.

May 8 - The STM unveils its deconfinement plan for public transit. According to the STM, a maximum of 150 people per metro train and 15 people per bus would be necessary to enforce social distancing rules. To do this, the transport company would need 8,000 buses and 800 metro trains. The STM currently has 1,425 buses and 97 metro trains.

May 10 – During the week of May 10, 267 statements of offense for non-compliance with distancing measures were submitted by the Montreal police force (SPVM), while 199 had been issued the previous week.

May 13 – The state of emergency is extended until May 20.

May 14 – During his first press conference in Montreal, Premier François Legault announces that Montreal schools will not reopen until September 2020. He also strongly recommends that users of public transport wear masks. Benoit Dorais announces that "face covers" are going to be distributed starting on May 18 in the metro.

May 15 – Premier Legault announces that the Quebec government will donate 1 million masks to Montreal, in addition to financial assistance of $6 million to various public transit organizations in the Greater Montreal region.

May 17 – Protesters against COVID-19 measures gather in Montreal before driving up to the provincial capital, Quebec City, for a larger protest.

May 18 – In a press conference, Premier Legault maintains the reopening date of May 25 for non-essential businesses that have an outdoor entrance.

May 19 – The Quebec government orders that the suspension be lifted with regard to work environments that offer outdoor, recreational or individual sports activities to the public, sports activities to the public, contact-free, conducted outside and in an unstructured manner.

May 20 – The state of emergency is extended until May 27. May 20 – The Minister of Labor, Employment and Social Solidarity, Jean Boulet, allows dentists, massage therapists, optometrists and many others to resume their activities in the Greater Montreal region starting on June 1, 2020. However, hairdressing and beauty salons, as well as gymnasiums and training rooms, would remain closed until further notice.

May 21 – In a press release, the City of Montreal announces the gradual reopening of sports and leisure facilities in Montreal, including community gardens, skateparks, golf courses, tennis courts, and other public spaces.

May 22 – Groups of at most 10 people are permitted to gather outside. It is recommended, but not required, that they be from at most three different households. François Legault, Marc Bergevin and Jonathan Drouin participate in the distribution of masks at the Cadillac metro station.

May 24 – Businesses that had been closed every Sunday by government mandate are able to resume activities on Sundays.

May 25 – Non-essential businesses reopen in the Greater Montreal region. The City of Montreal deploys around sixty inspectors to enforce physical distancing measures.

May 26 – Despite the reopening of businesses, Mayor Plante maintains her decision to not make wearing a mask mandatory in public areas, including in the metro.

May 27 – The reopening of facilities including private health offices, pet grooming services, personal and beauty care, museums, public libraries and camping sites outside of Greater Montreal Area is announced alongside an additional extension to the state of emergency.

May 28 – The City of Montreal urgently opens various municipal building to allow people to cool off, as Montreal experiences its first heat wave of the year, with temperatures regularly exceeding 30 °C (86 °F). The previous day, the second highest temperature in Montreal's entire history was recorded, at 36.6 °C (97.9 °F).

The Quebec government authorizes the purchase and installation of air conditioners in CHSLDs in Montreal, as only a third of rooms had air conditioning as of May 24.

May 30 – The suspension on the activities of municipal outdoor pools, wading pools and playground equipment, including splash pads, is lifted. At the end of May, Montreal's death rate was higher than most American cities, including Chicago and Los Angeles.

=== June ===
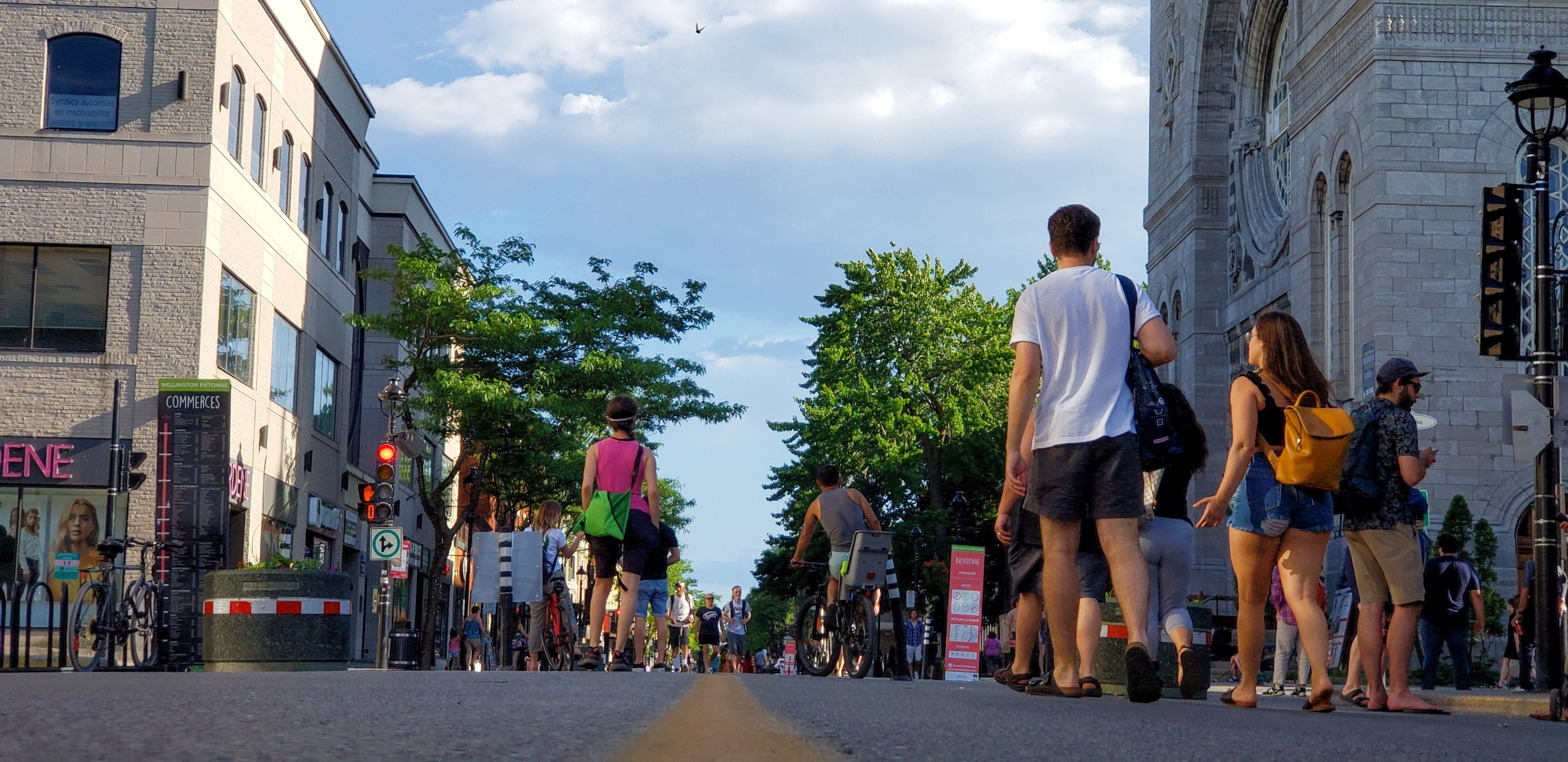
Pedestrianization of Wellington Street in Verdun, Montreal, during the summer in order to allow for social distancing

June 2 – Le Devoir reports that Montreal has only 150 investigators doing contract-tracing, and that 18,000 investigations have been conducted, a number deemed clearly insufficient in the event of a second wave.

June 5 – After having received several complaints, the Montreal ombudsman launches an investigation into the hastily implemented health corridors by the City of Montreal.

June 8 – The government announces that restaurants in Greater Montreal can open on June 22. The same day, Quebec's national public health director, Horacio Arruda, said that the situation in Montreal was "under control." However, a publicist from the amusement chain Six Flags, owner of La Ronde since 2001, confirmed to the 24 Heures newspaper that the Quebec government had not yet authorized La Ronde to open its doors.

In the weekly pandemic survey presented by Léger, 72% of Quebec respondents were of the opinion that there would be a second wave.

June 11 – Horacio Arruda rules out the possibility of a total lockdown in the event of a second wave.

June 12 – The Minister of Economy and Innovation, Pierre Fitzgibbon, announces the reopening of malls in Montreal on June 19.

June 13 – 60 Dollarama employees demonstrate in Montreal to demand better health and safety measures to fight COVID-19.

June 15 – Montreal barbershops and hair salons are able to reopen. The Montreal Botanical Garden also reopens.

The government of Quebec pledges $500,000 to help raise awareness of COVID-19 in Montreal through interventions like the distribution of masks.

June 16 – 35 workplace-related outbreaks are active in Montreal. Between June 6 and June 16, fewer than 100 cases were recorded per day in Montreal.

The government announces that June 19 will be the last day of operation for the five mobile testing centres in Montreal, which have been operational since mid-May 2020.

June 17 – The Journal des Voisins learns that modular units are going to be installed at the end of the summer in the parking lot of the Sacré-Coeur hospital in order to accommodate 100 patients in the event of a second wave of COVID-19.

Horacio Arruda announces that places of worship can hold indoor gatherings of up to 50 people from June 22 onwards.

Amidst a second heat wave in the city, the director of public health, Dr. Mylène Drouin, affirms that they have followed through with their plan to install air-conditioners in CHSLDs.

June 18 – The parking lots of major Montreal parks are permitted to reopen.

June 19 – The government of Quebec authorizes family visits to private seniors' homes (RPAs) that do not have a COVID-19 outbreak, starting on June 26. The day before, a similar measure had been announced for CHSLDs.

June 22 – The following establishments reopen:

- Restaurants in the Greater Montréal area (including food courts in shopping malls);
- Gyms, indoor pools, and arenas
- Public and private beaches
- Houses of worship (with a maximum of 50 congregants)
- Cinema, theatres, concert halls and other indoor venues (with a maximum of 50 people indoors)
- Day camps
- Libraries

For the first time since March 22, no new deaths are recorded in Quebec.

June 24 – Due to relative decreases in the rate of new cases, new health minister Christian Dubé (who assumed the post as part of a cabinet shuffle) announces plans to release new case numbers weekly beginning June 26, rather than daily. The move faced criticism (including from Prime Minister Justin Trudeau, who urged the Premier to continue being "transparent and open" in its data), leading the province to backtrack and continue releasing numbers daily. Quebec's Director of Public Health Horacio Arruda stated that he had misjudged how the public would react to the change, and that he did not mind continuing with daily updates.

June 25 – Horacio Arruda announces the immediate reopening of bars, spas, water parks, casinos and other tourist attractions.

June 26 – Following criticism from the public, the new Minister of Health and Social Services, Christian Dubé, announces via his Twitter account that daily reporting will start again on June 29.

A survey presented by the Canadian Medical Association (CMA) and carried out by L'Observateur reveals that only 42% of Quebecers said that they regularly wear a mask in public. The weekly survey by Léger produced similar results, finding that approximately 55% of Quebecers wear a mask at the grocery store, while only 18% wear a mask on public transit.

=== July ===
July 6 – Mayor Plante announces that masks will become mandatory in all closed public places in Montreal at the end of July.

July 10 – It becomes prohibited for bars in Quebec to serve alcohol after midnight. Additionally, bars must close by 1:00 a.m.

July 12 – Montrealers who have frequented bars in the metropolitan area are implored to get tested for COVID-19. Since July 1, at least eight customers or employees of five bars have tested positive for COVID-19.

July 14 – At least 30 cases from nine different bars are detected in Montreal since July 11. Although the public health agency did not release the names of these bars, some employees or customers posted them on social media.

July 17 – Quebec retroactively changes its methodology for determining recoveries, stating that its previous method, which did not consider non-hospitalized cases to be recoveries unless proof of their recovery was received, had "significantly underestimated" the total count, and was inconsistent with methodologies used in other provinces. This led to a one-time addition of 23,686 recoveries, and the reduction of active cases from 27,603 to 1,556. Premier Legault suggests that the spread of the virus is not linked to bars, but rather to private parties.

The Montreal Regional Directorate of Public Health announces that three new COVID-19 walk-in screening clinics are open.

July 18 – Masks become mandatory in closed public spaces for everyone over the age of 12. Businesses can be fined up to $6,000 if they allow customers to violate the mandate. Quebec becomes the first Canadian province to enact such an order.

July 23 – The Quebec government announces that the number of people who can attend indoor and outdoor gatherings in a public place will increase from 50 to 250 people starting on August 3, 2020. People must sit at least 1.5 meters from each other, unless they are part of the same household, before removing their face coverings. They will have to put their mask back on before moving again.

July 25 – A hundred people demonstrate at the foot of the George-Étienne Cartier Monument on Mount Royal against the obligation to wear a mask.

Towards the end of July, some Montrealers who had been tested for COVID-19 had to wait more than five days to get their result.

July 31 – In order to deal with a possible second wave, Medicom Group, a company established on the island of Montreal, starts manufacturing N95 masks.

=== August ===
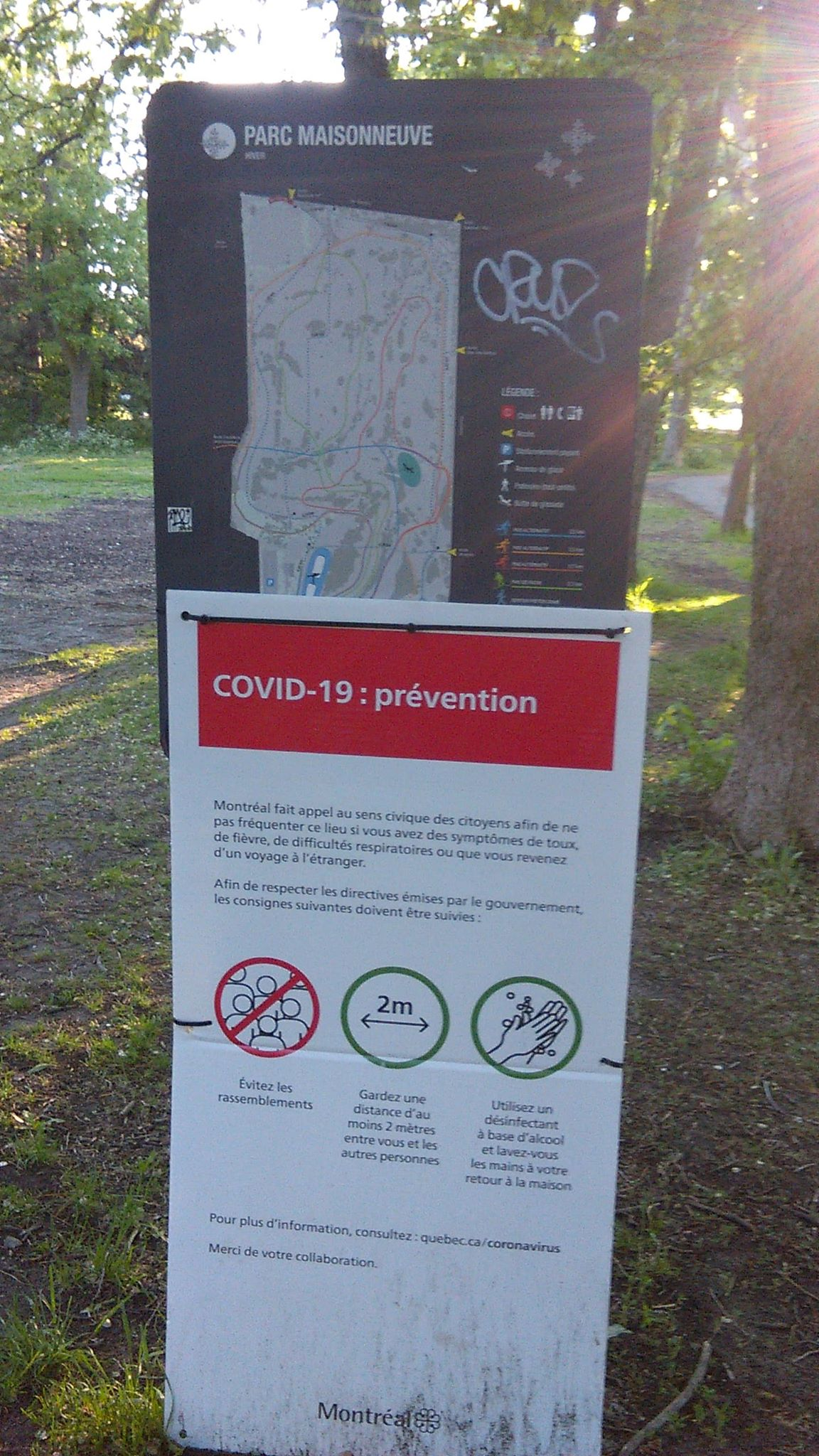
Prevention instructions at Maisonneuve Park

August 5 – A seroprevalence study of blood donors carried out by Héma-Québec shows that 3.05% of Montrealers who participated in the study had contracted COVID-19.

August 7 – Dr. Mylène Drouin, director of public health in Montreal, in a press conference with Dr. Horracio Arruda, declares that they are ready for the worst in the event of a second wave, which could occur at the start of autumn.

August 8 – A march against sanitary measures brings together hundreds of demonstrators.

August 20 – Mayor Plante denounces the August 16 party organized at the foot of Mount Royal where approximately 2,000 people gathered between 4 p.m. and 5 p.m.

August 24 – Montreal Public Health asks that anyone who has participated in Latin dance events, indoors or outdoors, since July 31 get tested for COVID-19; a person who had participated in activities at Lafontaine Park and Verdun Park tested positive for COVID-19.

August 26 – Legault and other officials rule out the adoption of the federal COVID Alert Exposure Notification app in the province for the moment, citing privacy concerns and existing contact tracing capabilities. Legault also expresses an objection to using software primarily developed in Ontario, as Montreal is "one of the best centres in the world" for artificial intelligence development.

=== September ===
September 8 – The Mayor of Longueuil, Sylvie Parent, tests positive for COVID-19.

September 28 – Amid a major spike in cases in Greater Montreal, Quebec City, and Chaudière-Appalaches, Premier Legault announces that restrictions will be reinstated in these areas effective midnight on October 1, including the banning of indoor gatherings and the closure of restaurants, bars, movie theatres, museums and other indoor public spaces. The restrictions will operate under the "red zone" of the new regional alert and intervention system, which uses four colour-coded tiers to prescribe health restrictions for each region.

September 30 – Quebec gives police the legal powers "to enter homes quickly to stop gatherings during COVID-19". Police officers "will be able to obtain warrants faster through a new, virtual system that was established in collaboration with the Crown... Normally the process for obtaining a warrant can take a day or two, but that won't work when police want to break up parties that very same evening," said Premier Legault. Public Security Minister Geneviève Guilbault said "We had to give the police the means to intervene." She said that the right to peaceful protest "without masks cannot be tolerated" and she is not ruling out using force to disperse protests if needed. "Eventually, we will cross that bridge when we get there," she said.

=== October ===
October 1 – Quebec reverses its earlier objections and announces that it plans to join COVID Alert, with Dubé arguing that it would be quicker to adopt a platform that was already available than to commission one from local developers.

October 5 – Quebec officially joins the COVID Alert app. Premier Legault emphasizes that the more people use the app, "the more successful we will be and the faster we can go back to a normal way of life."

The government announces new measures for regions in red zones including the closure of gyms, suspension of team sports, and mandate for high school students to wear masks. The restrictions are meant to be in effect from October 8 to October 28.

October 6 – The province records 1,364 new cases, its largest increase to-date. Dubé emphasizes that residents must reduce social contacts and stay home in order to reduce the spread, stating that "I'm glad that we were ready because of the severity and speed of the second wave, but we cannot control how people react to the measures."

October 15 – Premier Legault announces that trick-or-treating will be permitted in all zones of the province, as long as physical distancing is observed and groups consist only of those living in the same household.

October 26 – Two days before red zone restrictions are meant to expire, the Quebec government extends them for another 4 weeks, until November 23.

=== November ===
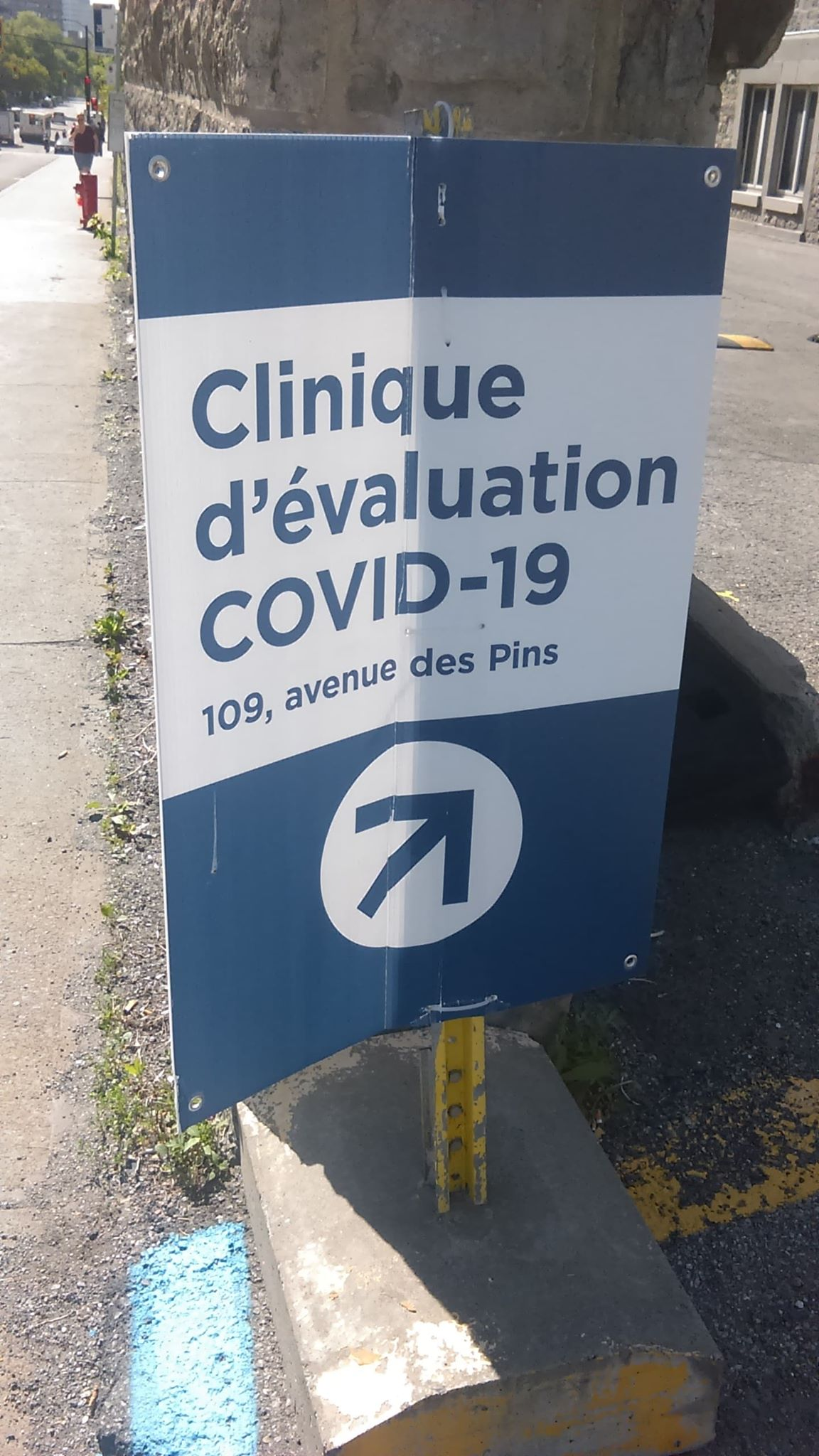
Screening clinic at Hôtel-Dieu hospital

November 19 – Premier Legault announces that restrictions will be loosened for Christmas. Specifically, private gatherings of up to 10 people will be permitted from December 24 to December 27. However, he also announces that restrictions in red zones will be extended to January 11, 2021.

=== December ===
December 3 – The government rolls back their permissions on holiday gatherings in red zones due to a significant rise in cases and hospitalizations at the end of November, deviating from the relative stability of around 1,200 new cases per day that characterized the majority of the month. Consequently, holiday celebrations will be restricted to one's own family "bubble", defined as those who live at the same address. An exception will be made for single-parent households and people who live alone, who are permitted to join one other family's bubble between December 17 and January 10, 2021.

December 10 – Montreal registers a record 648 new cases of COVID-19.

December 13 – Quebec receives its first shipments of Pfizer-BioNTech COVID-19 vaccines.

December 14 – The first person in Quebec and Canada gets vaccinated against COVID-19.

December 15 – In the face of the worsening second wave, the Quebec government orders the closure of non-essential stores from December 25 to January 11, 2021, the date on which other restrictions are also meant to be lifted. The opening of both elementary and high schools is delayed by a week, to January 11.

December 24 – Seniors living in CHSLDs in red zones become allowed to have visits from their regular caregivers. These visits are limited to 1 per 24 hours and caregivers have to book an appointment beforehand. Gift exchanges between people who do not live together are permitted as long as they take place outdoors and the participants wash their hands before and after handling gifts, ensuring to maintain a distance of 2 meters and wear a mask.

December 25 – Quebecers in red zones, including Montreal and Laval, are not able to hold private gatherings for Christmas or New Years, with celebrations being restricted to their own family "bubble", defined as those who live at the same address. However, single-parent households and people who live alone are permitted to join one other family's bubble. In orange zones, gatherings of up to six people may take place, and in yellow zones, gatherings of 10 people are permitted.

December 28 – Montreal reaches a new record of 968 new cases.

December 29 – Two days before New Year's Eve, Quebec registers 2,870 cases, the highest since the beginning of the pandemic. Additionally, the first case of a COVID-19 variant in Quebec is confirmed.

December 31 – By the end of the month, Quebec had opened 21 vaccination centres, including five in Montreal, where over 6,000 Montrealers had been vaccinated, and two in Quebec City.

== 2021 ==
=== January ===
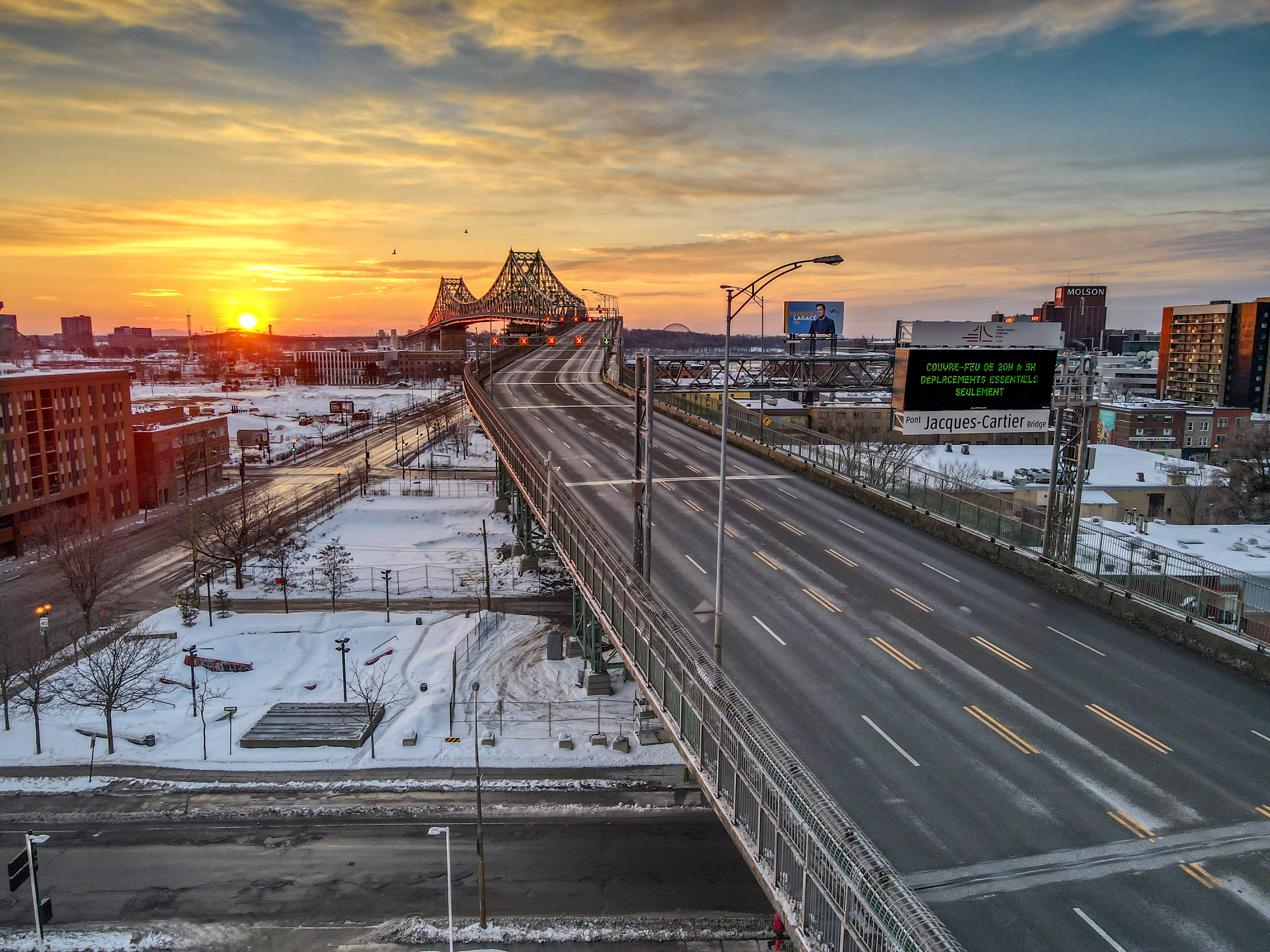
An empty Jacques Cartier Bridge soon after curfew

January 6 – Faced with the ineffectiveness of current measures to curb the spread of the virus, Legault announces that the lockdown will be extended for another four weeks and a curfew from 8:00 p.m to 5:00 a.m will be in effect starting January 9. Essential stores will have to close by 7:30 p.m and those caught contravening the curfew could face fines of up to $6,000, with exceptions made for health emergencies and essential workers travelling for work reasons. People will also be able to walk their dog within a one kilometre radius of their house. Additionally, although elementary schools will open as planned on January 11, high schools will remain closed until January 18. Legault defends the decision by saying that "the situation in our hospitals is critical, especially in Montreal. There are too many visits in homes."

Quebec sets a record number of daily cases at 2,880.

January 9 – A curfew starting at 8:00 p.m and lasting until 5:00 a.m comes into effect in almost the entire province.

January 11 – Elementary schools reopen across the province.

Map of regional alert levels in Quebec during peak of second wave

January 18 – Montreal records less than 500 daily new cases for the first time since December.

January 23 – $55,600 worth of fines are given out to 36 participants of a party in Mirabel, with each fine costing $1,546.

=== February ===
February 2 – Premier Legault announces that in response to the decline in cases, certain restrictions will be lifted starting on February 8. Notably, non-essential stores, hair salons and museums throughout the province will be able to reopen. Universities and CEGEPs will also have the opportunity to gradually return to in-person classes. In orange zones, which currently comprise about 10% of the Quebec population, the curfew will begin at 9:30 p.m instead of 8:00 p.m, and gyms and restaurants will be permitted to reopen.

February 7 – Quebec's total death toll surpasses 10,000.

February 9 – Quebec's first case of the South African variant is confirmed in the region of Abitibi-Témiscamingue.

February 10 – Seven cases of the British variant are confirmed in Montreal, in addition to 2 cases of other variants. 35 suspected cases are under investigation.

February 11 – Minister Dubé reveals that only 8.5% of confirmed COVID-19 cases in Quebec are tested for variants, adding that his government plans to start testing every positive case in Montreal for variants by the end of next week.

February 12 – The Quebec government says it is preparing to accelerate its use of the 2.6 million rapid COVID-19 tests sent by the federal government in October, as less than 1% had been used thus far. The tests will be primarily used in places experiencing outbreaks, such as schools or businesses. The same day, the number of total cases in Montreal surpasses 100,000.

February 16 – In preparation for Quebec's spring break (French: semaine de relâche) Premier Legault announces further deconfinement measures targeted at families with children, including the reopening of movie theatres, indoor pools, and other low-risk indoor sports activities. However, Legault urges caution, as the semaine de relâche of 2020 is considered to have been one of the main exacerbating factors of Quebec's first wave.

February 23 – Premier Legault announces that the next highest vaccination priority group—those who are 80 years of age and older in Montreal and those who are 85 years of age and older in the rest of Quebec—will begin to be vaccinated on March 1. Reservations will become available on February 25 by phone or online.

=== March ===
March 1 – Vaccination of the general population of Quebec begins in Montreal, starting with the 80-year-old and older cohort. The same day, Montrealers in the next priority group (people aged 70 to 79) become able to make reservations to get vaccinated.

March 2 – Minister Dubé confirms that 350 pharmacies in Montreal will begin taking appointments for vaccinations on March 15, adding that the situation in Montreal with respect to the spread of the British variant is concerning. The Director of the Vaccination Campaign Against COVID-19 in Quebec (French: directeur de la campagne de vaccination contre la COVID-19 au Québec), Daniel Paré, reveals that since February 25, there have been over 350,000 vaccination reservations made online.

March 3 – Premier Legault announces that all regions of Quebec, except for the Greater Montreal region, will enter the orange zone on March 8.

March 9 – Quebec confirms its first case of the Brazil variant.

March 10 – Vaccination appointments become available province-wide for Quebecers 70 years of age and older.

March 12 – Minister Isabelle Charest announces that indoor gyms and training facilities in red zones will be able to reopen on March 26. Outdoor group activities will be limited to eight people in red zones and to 12 people in orange zones. Vaccination appointments for Montrealers aged 65 and older become available.

March 16 – Premier Legault announces several relaxations of restrictions, including that:

- On March 17, the curfew in red zones will be pushed to 9:30 p.m.
- On March 22, students in grades 9, 10, and 11 will be able to attend school full-time in-person in orange zones.
- On March 26, the regions of Gaspésie–Îles-de-la-Madeleine, Côte-Nord, and Nord-du-Québec will enter the yellow zone, wherein the curfew will be abolished.
- On March 26, theatres and show venues in red zones can reopen.

He also promises that by June 24, all Quebecers who wish to be vaccinated will have at least their first dose.

March 17 – The curfew in red zones begins at 9:30 p.m. instead of 8:00 p.m.

March 18 – The percentage of the province's population that has received at least one vaccine dose reaches 10%. Quebec surpasses 300,000 total cases of COVID-19.

March 22 – Quebec confirms its first case of the B.1.525 variant originating in Nigeria.

March 26 – Gaspésie–Îles-de-la-Madeleine, Côte-Nord, and Nord-du-Québec enter the yellow zone. Gyms, show venues, and theatres open in red zones. Religious gatherings are increased to up to 250 people in all regions. Meanwhile, the INSPQ releases its most recent COVID-19 modeling, finding that within the next week, the variants will become the dominant strain in Quebec.

March 29 – Minister Dubé declares that Quebec is now in its third wave of the COVID-19 pandemic. Quebec suspends the use of the Oxford–AstraZeneca COVID-19 vaccine in people under 55 years of age as a precautionary measure.

=== April ===
April 1 – Amid a notable rise in cases, the regions of Bas-Saint-Laurent, Capitale-Nationale, Chaudière-Appalaches, and Outaouais re-enter the red zone. Special emergency measures go into effect in Quebec City, Lévis, and Gatineau until April 12, including a curfew at 8:00 p.m. and the closure of schools, gyms, non-essential businesses, cinemas, and dine-in restaurants. More than 140 cases in Quebec City are linked to an outbreak at a gym.

April 4 – Special emergency measures are extended to the regions of Beauce, Bellechasse, and Les Etchemins.

April 8 – The easing of restrictions in red zones is rolled back as a "preventative" measure. Gyms are ordered to close, although other indoor sports facilities, like pools and ice rinks, can remain open. Religious gatherings are limited to 25 people, down from 100. In orange zones, religious gathering are reduced to 100 people from 250 and it becomes obligatory for children in elementary school to wear a mask.

April 11 – The curfew in Montreal and Laval returns to 8:00 p.m., but remains at 9:30 p.m. for other regions in the red zone.

April 12 – High school students in red zones return to a hybrid learning model, attending school in-person every second day. Extracurricular activities are also cancelled.

April 13 – Premier Legault announces that the special emergency measures in place in the regions of Capitale-Nationale, Chaudière-Appalaches, and Outaouais will last an additional week, ending on April 25. In Chaudière-Appalaches and Outaouais, the measures will be extended to encompass the entire territory on April 14, rather than just Lévis and Gatineau. Côte-Nord re-enters the orange zone after an increase in cases. Legault reminds Quebecers that non-essential travel to the regions of Nord-du-Québec, Gaspésie—Îles-de-la-Madeleine, and Côte-Nord is still prohibited.

April 14 – The percentage of the province's population that has received at least one vaccine dose reaches 25%.

April 19 – The border between Ontario and Quebec closes for non-essential travel.

April 20 – Premier Legault extends the special emergency measures in place in the regions of Capitale-Nationale, Chaudière-Appalaches, and Outaouais until May 3.

April 21 – The minimum age limit for the Oxford-AstraZeneca vaccine is lowered to 45. The AstraZeneca vaccine will be made available for those within the age range by appointment or by drop-in. Quebec's first case of the B.1.617 variant originating in India is confirmed in the Mauricie-Centre-du-Québec region.

April 23 – Vaccination opens up for people with a chronic illness or an underlying health condition that increases their risk of COVID-19 complications.

Only two days after opening, drop-in vaccination sites for the Oxford-AstraZeneca vaccine in Montreal are forced to close; all available doses had been administered. Scheduled vaccination appointments, however, continue as before.

April 26 – Vaccination opens up for people with physical or intellectual disabilities, including those on the autism spectrum.

April 27 – Premier Legault announces that elementary schools will reopen in Capitale-Nationale and Chaudière-Appalaches on May 3, except for the areas of Beauce-Etchemin and Bellechasse. Despite signs of improvement, Outaouais, meanwhile, will maintain all of its current restrictions, as its positivity rate is still nearly three times the provincial average of 2.9%. Additionally, the curfew in Montreal and Laval will be pushed to 9:30 p.m. on May 3. In the same press conference, Dr. Horacio Arruda confirms that a woman from the region of Montérégie has died of a thrombosis linked to the AstraZeneca vaccine, a first in Canada.

April 28 – Pregnant women become able to get vaccinated. The same day, the Formula 1 Canadian Grand Prix, held in Montreal at the Circuit Gilles Villeneuve, is cancelled for a second year in a row due to the pandemic.

April 29 – The Quebec government announces its vaccine schedule for adults under 60 years old, revealing that by May 14, everyone over 18 years old in Quebec should be able to book a vaccination appointment.

April 30 – Vaccination opens up to people aged 50 to 59 years old.

=== May ===
May 1 – Special emergency measures are extended to the southern half of Bas-Saint-Laurent, including the areas of Kamouraska, Les Basques, Rimouski-Neigette, Rivière-du-Loup, and Témiscouata. Thousands of people gather at the Olympic Stadium in protest of sanitary measures, with some protesters having travelled to Montreal from other areas of Quebec in order to attend. The protest forces the temporary interruption of vaccinations at the Olympic Stadium, one of the largest vaccination sites in Montreal.

May 3 – Vaccination opens up to people aged 45 to 49 years old. Elementary schools reopen in Capitale-Nationale and Chaudière-Appalaches, except for the areas of Beauce-Etchemin and Bellechasse. The curfew in Montreal and Laval is pushed to 9:30 p.m.

May 4 – Premier Legault announces that as of May 10, special emergency measures will be discontinued in Québec City, meaning that the entire region of Capitale-Nationale will re-enter the red zone. In Chaudière-Appalaches, special emergency measures will be discontinued and the region will re-enter the red zone everywhere except Beauce-Sartigan, Robert-Cliche, and Les Etchemins. In Outaouais, special emergency measures will be discontinued and the region will re-enter the red zone everywhere except Gatineau, Pontiac, and Les Collines-de-l'Outaouais. Even in areas where special emergency measures are in place, elementary students in Chaudière-Appalaches and Outaouais will be able to return to school in-person on May 10. Additionally, Abitibi-Témiscamingue will go from the orange zone to the yellow zone. Meanwhile, a municipality in Estrie, Le Granit, will become subject to special emergency measures starting May 5.

The same day, Minister Dubé announces Quebec's first drive-thru vaccination clinic, located at the Pierre Elliot Trudeau International Airport in Montreal. It is slated for opening on May 17 and will be able to administer 4,000 doses per day once operational.

May 5 – Vaccination opens up to people aged 40 to 44 years old. The area of Le Granit in Estrie becomes subject to special emergency measures.

May 6 – Quebec vaccinates a record 102,700 people. Minister Dubé announces that on May 13, Quebecers will begin receiving digital proof of vaccination in the form of a QR code that is sent by email.

May 7 – Vaccination opens up to people aged 35 to 39 years old. Approximately five people who had ridden a bus from the Chaudière-Appalaches region to Montreal in order to attend the May 1 protest against health measures test positive for COVID-19. Health authorities encourage other bus-goers to get tested.

May 10 – Vaccination opens up to people aged 30 to 34 years old. Marguerite Blais, the Minister Responsible for Seniors, announces that all CHSLD residents who had received a first dose of the vaccine are now fully vaccinated with both doses. Several areas re-enter the red zone, including Capitale-Nationale, most of Chaudières-Appalaches, and parts of Outaouais. Abitibi-Témiscamingue moves to the yellow zone.

May 11 – Premier Legault announces that special emergency measures will no longer apply in Outaouais and Rimouski as of May 17, given the reduction in hospitalizations and cases in these regions. Red zone restrictions will then come into effect.

May 12 – Vaccination opens up to people aged 25 to 29 years old.

May 13 – The Quebec government announces the suspension of the AstraZeneca vaccine for first doses, citing the risk of post-vaccination embolic and thrombotic events in the current context of readily available mRNA vaccines (Pfizer and Moderna), which do not seem to pose the same risk. The move comes after several other provinces, including Ontario and Alberta, announced similar suspensions. Consequently, the 148,000 doses of AstraZeneca expected to arrive in the next week will be used as second doses for those over the age of 45 who have received the AstraZeneca vaccine as their first dose. However, for those under the age of 45, the CIQ recommends giving an mRNA vaccine as the second dose.

Drop-in vaccination opens at the Palais des congrès in Montreal.

May 14 – Vaccination opens up to people aged 18 to 24 years old.

May 17 – Outaouais and Rimouski move into the red zone.

May 18 – Premier Legault unveils Quebec's reopening plan for the summer. Relaxations will begin on May 28, on which date the curfew will end, and by the end of August, it is expected that most health measures will be obsolete, including mask mandates.

Reopening plan
Date	Measures
May 28	The curfew in all regions of Quebec will end.; Restaurant patios can open with a limited number of people per table (in red and orange zones, either two adults and their minor children from different households or one household per table; in yellow zones, residents of two households per table).; Travel between regions of the province will no longer be advised against.; Stadiums and venues that have designated sections can open with a maximum of 2,500 people (250 people per section), as long as physical distancing is enforced.; Outdoor gatherings of either a maximum of 8 people from different households or the entirety of two households will be allowed.
May 31	Most regions in the red zone will switch to the orange zone, as long as the epidemiological situation allows for it.
June 11	Bar patios can open with a limited number of people per table (in red and orange zones, either two adults and their minor children from different households or one household per table; in yellow zones, residents of two households per table).; Outdoor group sports will be allowed with a maximum of 25 people. In red and orange zones, only non-contact sports will be permitted; in yellow zones, sports with brief contact will be permitted.
June 14	Most regions in the orange zone will switch to the yellow zone, as long as the epidemiological situation allows for it.
June 25	People who are fully vaccinated can hold private gatherings without masks nor physical distancing.; Day camps and summer camps can open.; Outdoor events, including festivals and concerts, of up to 2,500 people will be allowed.; Stadiums and venues will no longer have to limit occupancy to 250 people per section, although they will still have to obey a maximum of 2,500 people.
June 28	Most regions in the yellow zone will switch to the green zone, as long as the epidemiological situation allows for it.
End of August	Under the condition that at least 75% of Quebecers over the age of 12 have had at least one dose: Restrictions will be loosened in schools.; CEGEP and university students will be able to return to class in-person.; The regional alert system will end.; Masks will no longer be required in most scenarios.

May 19 – The percentage of the province's population that has received at least one vaccine dose reaches 50%. In light of the cancellation of the 2021 Canadian Grand Prix due to the pandemic, Minister Dubé and Mayor Plante announce the opening of a vaccination clinic at the Circuit Gilles Villeneuve that will welcome both vehicles and cyclists. The clinic is set to open on May 29 and will run every weekend until June 13.

May 21 – Vaccination opens up to people aged 12 to 17 years old.

May 27 – Minister Dubé announces that the interval between the first and second dose of the AstraZeneca vaccine will be shortened to 8 weeks, as opposed to 16 weeks, following new recommendations from the CIQ.

May 28 – After having been in effect for nearly 140 days, the curfew ends in all regions of Quebec. Numerous other reopenings come into effect, including the reopening of restaurant patios, with a limited number of occupants per table, and the reopening of stadiums and venues, with a maximum of 2,500 people (250 people per section). Private outdoor gatherings also become permitted, with either a maximum of 8 people from different households or the entirety of two households.

May 31 – The red-zone regions of Bas-Saint-Laurent, Capitale-Nationale, Chaudière-Appalaches, Estrie, Lanaudière, Laurentides, Montérégie, and Outaouais move into the orange zone. However, certain regions of Bas-Saint-Laurent, Chaudière-Appalaches, and Estrie remain in the red zone. This relaxation leaves Montreal and Laval as the only regions still entirely in the red zone in Quebec.

=== June ===
June 1 – Premier Legault confirms that Montreal and Laval will move into the orange zone on June 7. On that same day, regions currently in yellow zones (Abitibi-Témiscamingue, Côte-Nord, and Nord-du-Québec) will move to the green zone, which will constitute the first time a green zone has appeared on the map since September 2020, when the alert zone system was put in place. Additionally, some regions currently in the orange zone will move to the yellow zone, including Saguenay–Lac-Saint-Jean, Mauricie et Centre-du-Québec, and parts of Bas-Saint-Laurent.

June 2 – A midnight curfew is put in place in the Old Port of Montreal in order to discourage the large and disorderly parties that have been taking place since the end of the curfew.

June 5 – Thousands of people attend a protest in Montreal calling for the end of health restrictions.

June 6 – The percentage of the population over the age of 11 who has received at least one dose of a vaccine reaches 75%. A heat wave forces Montreal to open public facilities, like waterparks, earlier than planned. Additionally, the hours of operation for pools are extended.

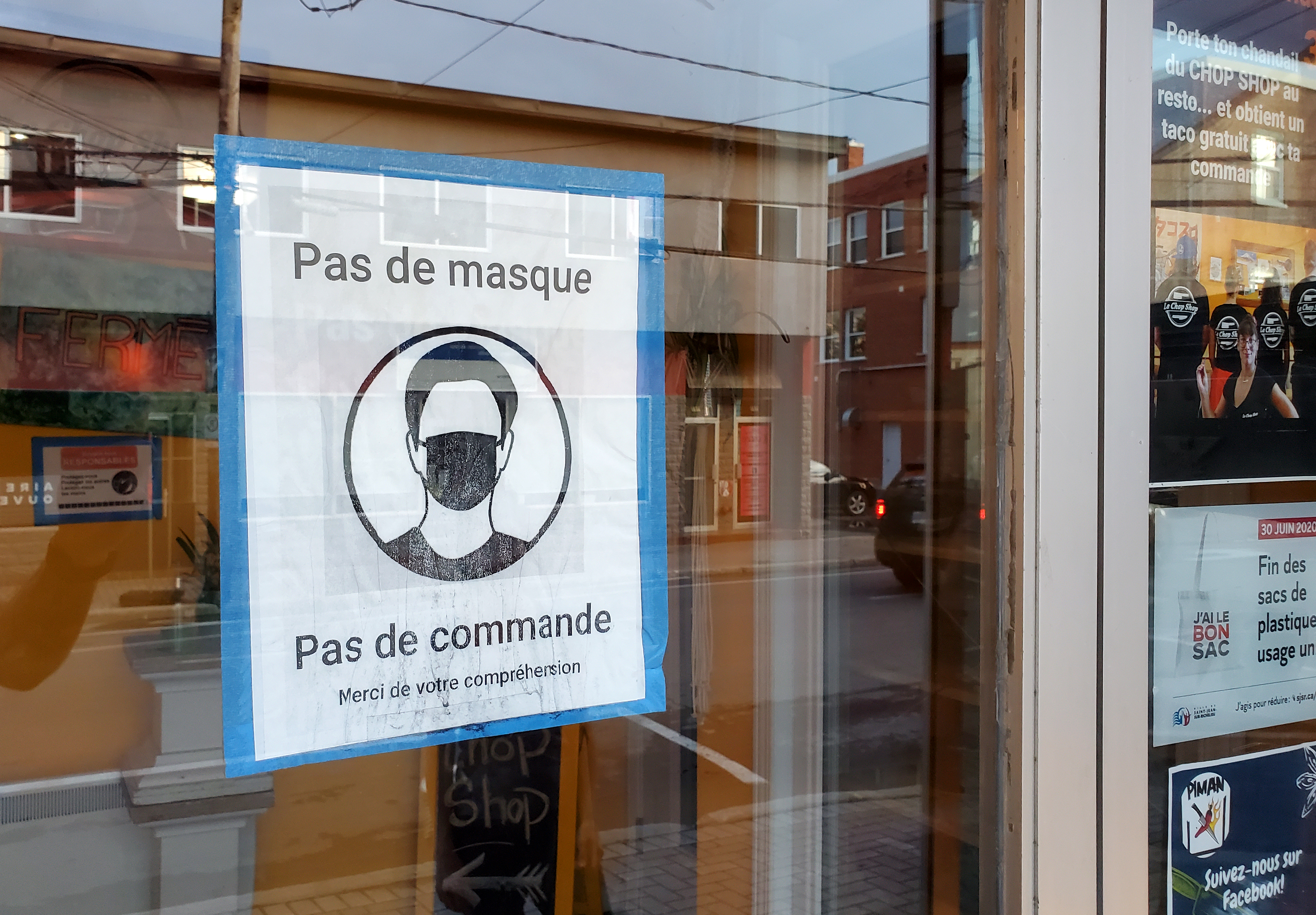
A business in Saint-Jean-sur-Richelieu requiring customers to wear masks when ordering food

June 7 – The two regions remaining in the red zone, Montreal and Laval, move into the orange zone. Notably, this means that indoor dining rooms can re-open for the first time since October 2020 and gyms can re-open for the first time since a brief re-opening in April. Saguenay–Lac-Saint-Jean, Mauricie et Centre-du-Québec, and parts of Bas-Saint-Laurent move into the yellow zone. Abitibi-Témiscamingue, Côte-Nord, and Nord-du-Québec move into the green zone.

The Quebec government announces that in green and yellow zones, employees will no longer have to wear a mask in situations where social distancing is maintained or where there is a physical barrier between employees.

June 8 – Premier Legault announces that proms that are held outdoors will be allowed as of July 8 with a maximum of 250 people. Masks and social distancing will be optional. According to Dr. Horacio Arruda, the risk is very low, as "young people have a better immune reaction than older people. After 14 days or three weeks after the first dose, they will be almost entirely protected, probably more than 90%." Additionally, Legault confirms that other reopenings will proceed as scheduled, including the transferring of orange zones to yellow zones on June 14.

Students no longer have to wear masks in classrooms, although they must continue wearing them in hallways, buses, and other common areas. The move comes after a heat wave hit the province.

June 11 – Bar patios in orange zones re-open.

June 14 – All regions in orange zones, where about 85% of Quebec's population lives, move into the yellow zone. Most notably, this means that bars can fully open, residents from up to two households can gather indoors, and masks can be taken off in workplaces under certain conditions. In green and yellow zones, hours of operation for bars are extended. Bars can now serve alcohol until midnight and close at 2:00 a.m.

June 15 – The Montreal Marathon, which was supposed to take place on September 24–26, is cancelled for the second year in a row.

June 16 – The border between Ontario and Quebec reopens.

June 17 – Some Quebecers experience difficulties advancing their appointment for their second dose due to shipment delays from Pfizer-BioNTech. The maximum number of spectators in venues increases from 2,500 to 3,500.

June 21 – The number of new cases drops below 100 for the first time since the summer of 2020. Three regions in the yellow zone move into the green zone: Bas-Saint-Laurent, Mauricie et le Centre-du-Québec, and Saguenay–Lac-Saint-Jean.

June 25 – People who are fully vaccinated become able to participate in indoor gatherings without a mask or social distancing and the limit on large outdoor events is increased to 3,500 from 2,500.

June 28 – With 70% of Quebecers having received at least one dose of a vaccine, the entire province moves into the green zone. The green zone allows for indoor gatherings of up to 10 people, outdoor gatherings of up to 20 people, sports competitions (50 spectators if held outside, 25 if held inside), and weddings and funerals of up to 250 seated guests.

=== July ===
July 8 – Minister Dubé announces that a vaccine passport in the form of a QR code will be instituted in September 2021. It will only be used in exceptional circumstances, such as an outbreak of COVID-19 in a high-risk setting, and will never be used for essential services.

July 14 – For the first time since the start of the pandemic, a week passes with no new deaths from COVID-19.

July 15 – People in the 12 to 17 year old age group become able to advance their appointment for their second dose by four weeks.

July 16 – In an attempt to entice the remaining 17% of eligible Quebecers to get vaccinated, Minister Dubé announces that people over 18 who have been vaccinated can enter into a cash lottery starting on July 25. There will be four prizes worth $150,000 each and one prize worth $1 million. For those between the ages of 12 and 17, they can enter into a contest for bursaries. There will be eight bursaries worth $10,000 each and 16 worth $20,000. The draws will occur weekly starting on August 6, 2021, and ending on September 3, 2021, on which date the draw for the largest cash prize of $1 million will take place.

July 25 – Registration for the vaccine lottery opens.

=== August ===
August 1 – Green zone restrictions loosen further: the limit on indoor venues and stadiums increases to 500 people per section, for a total of 7,500 people, and bars become able to serve alcohol until 1:00 a.m., one hour later than previously.

August 5 – In response to a rise in cases, Premier Legault confirms that a vaccine passport will soon be implemented for certain non-essential services, so as to avoid another partial lockdown.

August 6 – The first draw of the vaccine lottery takes place. Adults can win one prize of $150,000 and those in the 12-17 year old age group can win one of two bursaries.

August 10 – Minister Dubé announces further details on the vaccine passport system, specifying that it will come into effect on September 1, 2021, and will be used for restaurants, bars, gyms, festivals, and other venues with large numbers of people or close contact between people. Pilot projects will be run at a bar in Quebec City, a bar in Montreal, and a gym in Laval.

August 11 – Education Minister Jean-François Roberge announces that when the school year begins in autumn, kids in primary and secondary school will not have to wear masks in classrooms, although they will still have to wear masks in other common areas, like buses and hallways.

August 15 – The percentage of the population aged 12 and up who is adequately vaccinated reaches 75%. The Quebec government defines an adequately vaccinated person as someone who has received either two doses of a vaccine or one dose if they previously had COVID-19.

August 17 – Premier Legault announces that vaccination will be mandatory for healthcare workers in Quebec, both in the private sector and the public sector. Specifically, the mandate will apply to healthcare workers who spend more than 15 minutes with patients. Legault also announces that masks will be mandatory in CEGEPs and universities, including in classrooms.

August 23 – Montreal ends its municipal state of emergency, which had been in effect since March 27, 2020.

August 24 – Minister Roberge announces that kids in primary and secondary school in nine regions of Quebec (Montreal, Laval, Montérégie, Lanaudière, Laurentides, Centre-du-Québec, Outaouais, Estrie, and Mauricie) will have to wear masks in classrooms. Additionally, in all regions of Quebec vaccine passports will be used for extracurricular indoor sports and sports with a high degree of contact.

August 25 – The vaccine passport app, VaxiCode, becomes available for download on the Apple App Store. VaxiCode will display a QR code containing the name of the person, their date of birth, and their vaccination status. This QR code can be verified by another app, VaxiCode Verif, which is also available for download on the Apple App Store. Both apps, which were developed by a Quebec-based company, Akinox, will soon become available for download on Android.

August 28 – Thousands of people gather at Maisonneuve Park in Montreal to protest the mandatory vaccination of healthcare and education workers.

August 30 – VaxiCode becomes available for download on the Google Play Store. Additionally, the Quebec government announces that it will offer third doses to immunosuppressed people.

=== September ===
September 1 – The vaccine passport comes into effect for certain non-essential services.

September 7 – Minister Dubé confirms that healthcare workers in both the public and private sector will have to be fully vaccinated by October 15, 2021. Those who do not comply will be suspended without pay or reassigned to other duties, if possible.

September 28 – Minister Dubé announces that seniors living in long-term care homes will be able to receive a third dose of a COVID-19 vaccine once 6 months have passed since their second dose.

September 30 – The Quebec government announces that theatres can operate at full capacity starting on October 8, 2021, as long as clients have a valid vaccine passport and keep their masks on at all times (except when eating or drinking).

=== October ===
October 12 – Three days before the vaccine mandate for healthcare workers is meant to come into effect, several provincial medical organizations, including the Order of Nurses, the College of Physicians, and the Order of Pharmacists, announce that members who are still unvaccinated by the deadline will have their licence to practice revoked. However, their license can be reinstated upon full vaccination.

The percentage of the province's population aged 12 and over having received at least one vaccine dose reaches 90%.

October 13 – The deadline for healthcare workers to be fully vaccinated is pushed back by a month to November 15, 2021, due to concerns about staff shortages.

October 27 – The Quebec government announces that there will not be a vaccine mandate for school staff, including teachers. In Quebec's Superior Court, a legal challenge to the vaccine mandate for healthcare workers is heard.

=== November ===
November 2 – Minister Dubé announces further relaxations of restrictions, starting on November 15, including that bars and restaurants will no longer have to keep track of clients, and karaoke and dance will be allowed in bars again. Additionally, students in high school will not have to wear masks in classrooms. The government will also no longer recommend remote work where possible, allowing for a transition back to in-person work.

November 3 – The vaccine mandate for healthcare workers, which was set to come into effect on November 15, is cancelled. However, the requirement for newly hired healthcare workers to be vaccinated will remain.

November 9 – Quebecers aged 70 and older become able to get a third dose of a COVID-19 vaccine, provided it has been at least six months since their second dose.

November 24 – The vaccination campaign expands to children five to eleven years old following Health Canada's approval of the Pfizer-BioNTech vaccine for that age group.

November 29 – It is revealed that the first two confirmed cases of the Omicron variant in Canada passed through the Montréal-Pierre Elliott Trudeau International Airport.

=== December ===
December 7 – Eligibility for third doses is extended to health-care workers, people with chronic illnesses, people from isolated and remote communities, and pregnant women. Minister Dubé announces that as of December 23, the limit on private indoor gatherings will increase from 10 to 20.

December 16 – Due to a new wave of COVID-19 driven by the Omicron variant, Premier Legault announces new health restrictions. Starting on December 20, stores, places of worship, public events, theatres, bars, restaurants, and gyms will have reduced capacity. Additionally, sports tournaments and competitions will be suspended; dancing and karaoke will once again be prohibited in bars; the scope of activities targeted by the vaccine passport will expand to include places of worships, funerals, and weddings, if over 25 people; finally, private gatherings will remain capped at 10 people indoors and 20 people outdoors, reversing an announcement made the previous week. Businesses affected by the new restrictions will receive support from the provincial government, according to the Premier.

December 17 – Quebec sets a new record for daily new cases of COVID-19, at 3,768 cases. The previous record of 2,880 was set during the second wave of the virus, in January 2021.

December 18 – Mayor Plante tests positive for COVID-19.

December 20 – New restrictions come into effect at 5:00 p.m, including the closure of gyms, movie theatres, venues, bars, taverns, and casinos. Restaurants will remain open, but their hours will be restricted to 5 a.m to 10 p.m. Elementary schools and high school classes will be suspended until at least January 10, 2022. Additionally, it becomes mandatory for non-essential workers to work from home, thwarting widespread plans for a gradual return to the office beginning in January 2022.

On the same day, rapid tests become freely available to all Quebecers.

December 21 – The Quebec government submits a request to the federal government for military aid in administering third doses. Additionally, Montreal reinstates its state of emergency after having suspended it in the summer.

December 22 – Quebec records over 10,000 new cases of COVID-19 in one day for the first time since the pandemic began, reaching a total of 500,000 cumulative cases.

December 30 – Premier Legault announces new measures that come into effect on December 31, including the establishment of a 10:00 p.m to 5:00 a.m curfew, the closure of indoor dining rooms, and the prohibition of private gatherings.

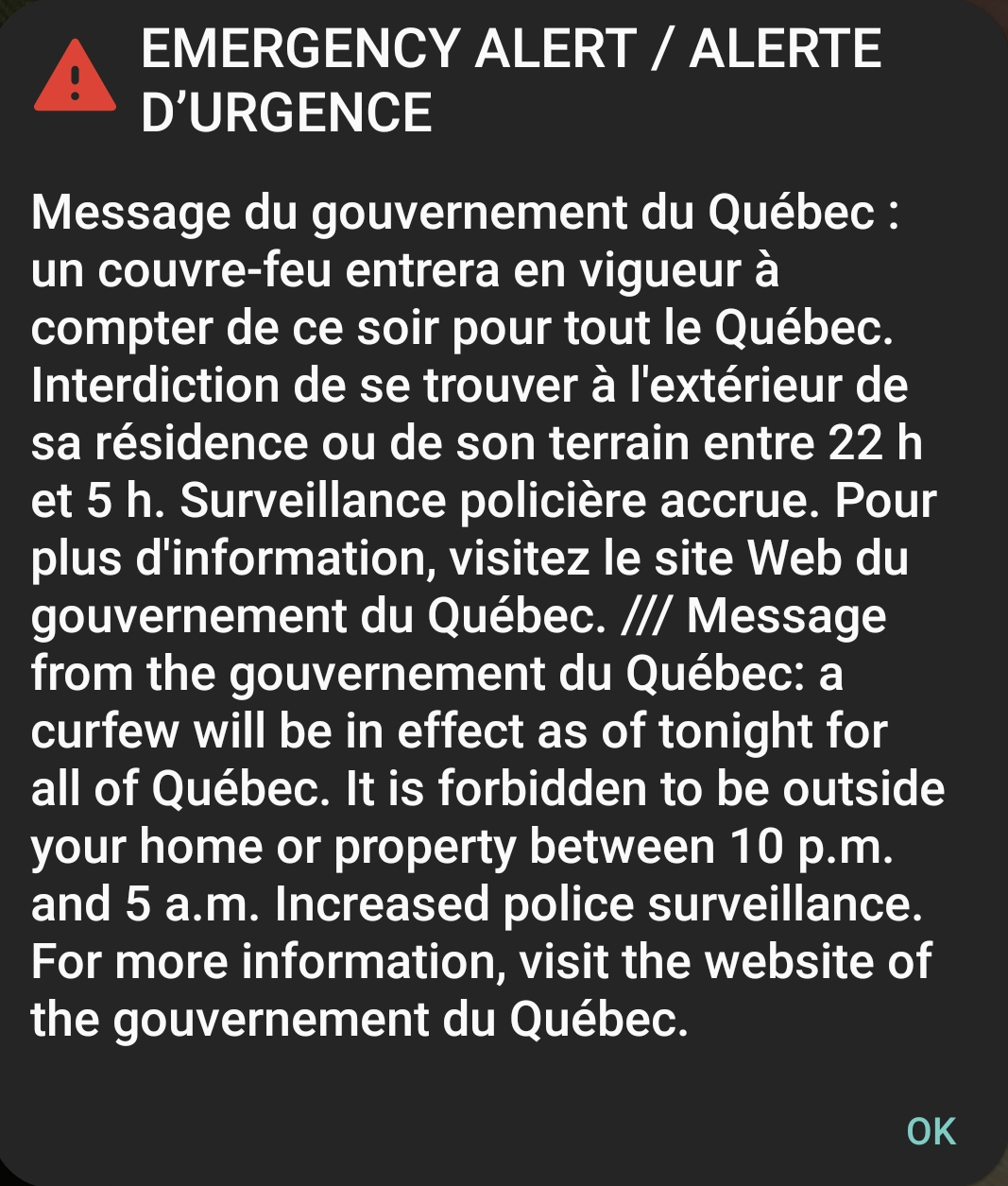
Emergency alert message sent out to all Quebecers on December 31, 2021, notifying them of the curfew

== 2022 ==
=== January ===
January 4 – The mandatory self-isolation period after COVID-19 infection goes down from 10 days to five days for fully vaccinated people. The same day, PCR testing for COVID-19 becomes restricted to only certain high-risk groups, including healthcare workers, patients in hospital, and Indigenous communities.

January 6 – Minister Dubé announces that the vaccine passport will apply to provincial alcohol and cannabis stores, and other non-essential services as of January 18. Additionally, he confirms that once third doses become widely available, the vaccine passport will only be valid for people who have received a third dose.

January 10 – The National Director of Public Health, Dr. Horacio Arruda, resigns after nearly two years of managing the pandemic, and is replaced in the interim by Dr. Luc Boileau.

January 11 – Premier Legault announces plans to require those who have not received at least one vaccine dose to pay an annual contribution santé ("health contribution", also referred to in English-language media as a "health tax").

January 13 – Only two weeks after it came into effect, Premier Legault announces that the curfew will be lifted on January 17, 2022, the same day that primary and secondary schools will reopen for in-person classes with mandatory masking. Additionally, as of January 23, 2022, stores will be able to open again on Sundays. On January 24, the vaccine passport will start applying to big-box stores with a surface area of more than 1,500 m^{2} (16,000 sq. ft.). Addressing the controversy around his proposal to charge unvaccinated residents an annual "tax", the Premier emphasizes that there will be a debate on the proposal in the Assemblée Nationale. Legault also reveals that his government has ordered 70 million rapid tests from a Quebec-based company, some of which will be produced in Montreal, and that they will soon begin distributing them to students.

January 17 – The curfew is lifted in all regions of Quebec, and schools reopen after an extended winter break.

January 24 – The vaccine passport is expanded to big-box stores, excluding pharmacies, gas stations, and stores whose "principal activity" is selling groceries. Customers who are not adequately protected can still access pharmacies that are within stores, but they will have to be accompanied by an employee and they cannot make any other purchases in the store.

January 25 – Premier Legault announces that restrictions will be loosened starting on January 31, 2022, when restaurants can open for indoor dining at 50% capacity, youth sports can restart, and private gatherings of four people (or two households) can take place again. On February 7, theatres, venues, and places of worship can reopen again at 50% capacity, with a maximum of 500 people in cultural spaces and a maximum of 250 people in places of worship.

January 26 – The Quebec government releases a website where Quebecers can declare the results of their rapid test.

January 31 – Private gatherings, limited to four people or two households, become permitted again. Restaurants open at 50% capacity and youth sports restart.

=== February ===
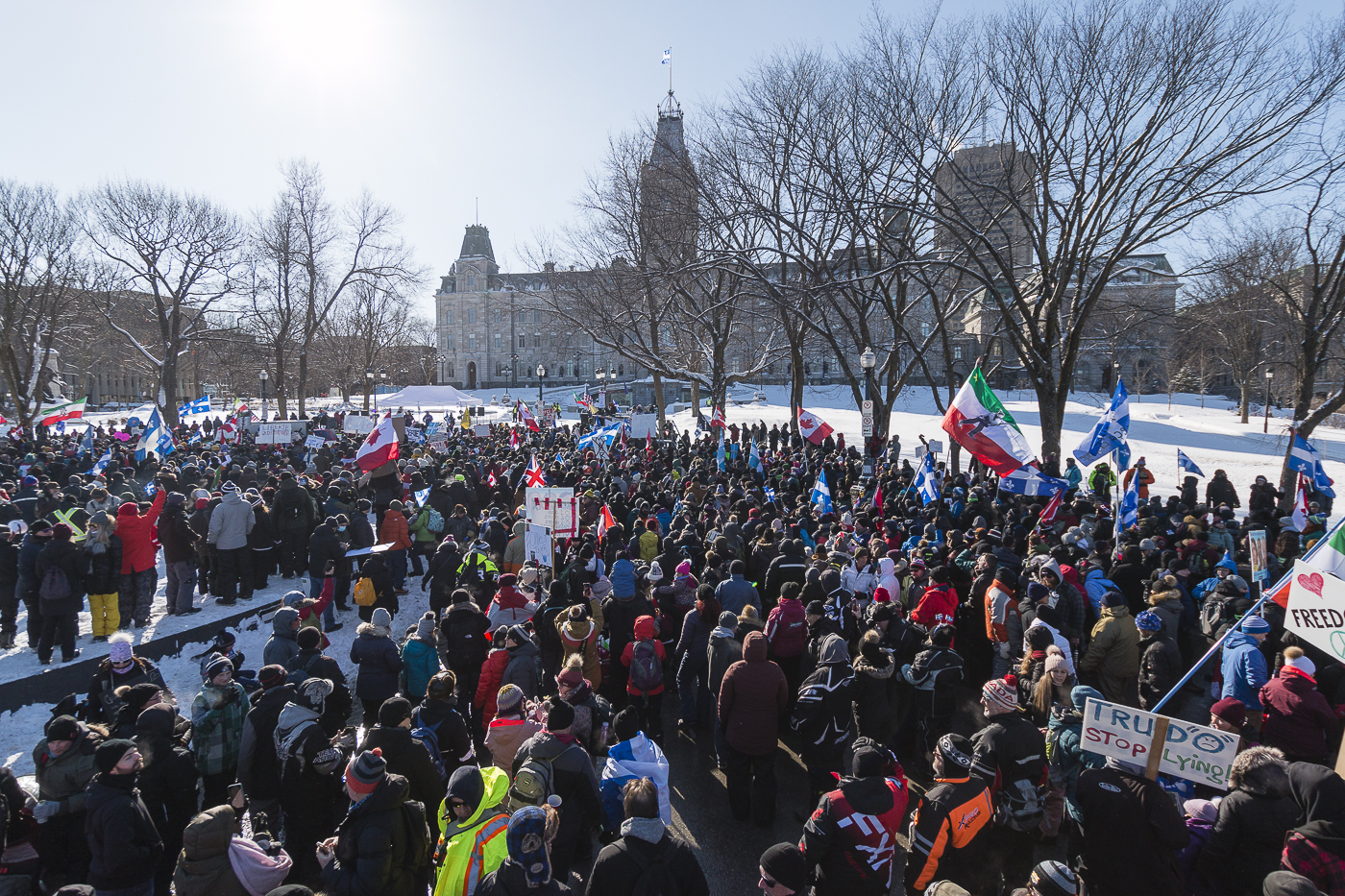
Freedom Convoy protest in front of the National Assembly in Quebec City on February 5

February 1 – Premier Legault backtracks on his proposed "health tax" for unvaccinated people, citing the "social cohesion" of the province. He also announces that gyms can re-open at half capacity and sports can restart on February 14, 2022.

February 5 – A week after the arrival of a convoy of protesters in Ottawa, a similar convoy of thousands of people arrives in Quebec City, demanding the lifting of COVID-19 restrictions.

February 6 – Trucks and cars parked in front of the National Assembly of Quebec in protest of COVID-19 restrictions and vaccine mandates are ordered to leave. Vehicles that do not leave will be fined or towed.

February 7 – Theatres, venues, and places of worship reopen at 50% capacity.

February 8 – Premier Legault announces a timeline for the lifting of most restrictions by March 14, 2022. No dates on the suspension of the vaccine passport or the mask mandate are revealed.

Planned timeline for lifting of restrictions
Date	Measures
February 12	Abolition of the limit on private indoor gatherings, though public health authorities still recommend keeping them to a maximum of 10 people.; Increase on the limit of people allowed per table in restaurants to 10.; Lifting of restrictions on visitors of CHSLDs and RPAs. Anyone with a valid vaccine passport will be able to visit.
February 14	Reopening of gyms and other indoor sports facilities at 50% capacity.; Increase on the limit of outdoor events to 5,000 people.
February 21	All stores can open at 100% capacity.; Removal of the absolute capacity limit (500 people) for indoor venues. Venues will still be restricted to a relative limit of 50%.
February 28	Restarting of sports tournaments and competitions.; Lifting of the remote working mandate, though it will remain recommended.; Increase on the capacity limit in places of worship and indoor venues to 100%, with the exception of the Videotron Centre in Quebec City and the Bell Centre in Montreal.; Reopening of bars and caissos at 50% capacity. No dancing or karaoke allowed. Restaurants and bars must close by 1:00 a.m.
March 14	Lifting of restriction on dance and karaoke in bars.; Increase on the capacity limit in restaurants, bars, and large venues (the Videotron Centre and the Bell Centre) to 100%.

February 12 – Thousands of protesters in Montreal march in protest of COVID-19 vaccine mandates, and in support of the trucker convoy still protesting in Ottawa for the third weekend in a row.

February 14 – Gyms and spas reopen after being closed for two months.

February 15 – Minister Dubé announces a gradual suspension of the vaccine passport, starting with big-box stores, cannabis stores, and liquor stores on February 16. On February 21, it will no longer be required for funeral homes and places of worship, and on March 14, it will be lifted in its entirety.

February 16 – In preparation for the third weekly protest against COVID-19 restrictions, Quebec City indefinitely bans alcohol and barbecues in public parks. The head of Quebec City's police service is also granted unrestricted permission to make any decisions necessary with regard to traffic circulation, parking, and road closures.

February 20 – Over the weekend protest, four arrests were made for assault and acts of indecency, 63 tickets were given out for violating municipal laws, 75 for not respecting road safety, and almost 30 for parking.

February 22 – The Quebec government announces that students in elementary and high school will no longer have to wear a mask in classrooms starting on March 7, 2022.

=== March ===
March 2 – The Quebec government moves up the suspension of the vaccine passport by two days, to March 12. The same day, all public spaces will be able to open at 100% capacity. The province also gives its first estimate as to when the mask mandate will end, suggesting that the mandate could be suspended by mid-April.

March 10 – Dr. Boileau announces that asymptomatic people who have been in close contact with someone who has tested positive for COVID-19 will no longer have to self-isolate as of March 12, the same day that most other remaining COVID-19 restrictions are meant to be lifted.

March 12 – Almost all remaining COVID-19 restrictions are discontinued, including the vaccine passport, capacity limits, the limit on visitors in long-term care homes, and reduced hours for certain establishments. Additionally, indoor high school proms will be allowed to take place for the first time in two years.

March 23 – The Quebec government announces that fourth doses will be given to people considered vulnerable or at-risk, including residents of long-term care homes, people 80 years of age and older, and immunocompromised people. Anyone eligible can book their appointment once at least three months have elapsed since they received their third dose.

March 30 – The INSPQ declares that Quebec is currently undergoing a sixth wave of COVID-19, with the majority of cases resulting from BA.2 infections.

=== April ===
April 1 – The antiviral drug Paxlovid becomes approved for prescription by pharmacists in Quebec. Pharmacists can prescribe the drug only to patients who have tested positive for COVID-19, are currently experiencing symptoms, and are at risk of developing more severe symptoms. However, if a patient's condition worsens after two days on the drug, they must be directed to a doctor or nurse.

April 5 – The mask mandate, which was supposed to end in mid-April, is extended until at least April 30. The province cites rising cases and hospitalizations as their reasoning; all other provinces, with the exception of P.E.I., have lifted the mask mandate, despite experiencing a similar new wave of the virus.

April 10 – Quebec reaches 1 million cumulative cases of COVID-19.

April 21 – The mask mandate is extended to mid-May.

April 29 – Prime Minister Trudeau and Premier Legault announce that a Moderna vaccine production facility, set to be operational by 2024, will be constructed in Montreal.

=== May ===
May 4 – Dr. Boileau announces that as of May 14, masks will no longer be mandatory in indoor spaces, except on public transit and in healthcare settings. The same day, Quebec's Institute of Statistics releases provincial life expectancy data for 2021. While life expectancy declined from 82.9 years to 82.3 years in 2020, it recovered in 2021 and increased to a record 83 years.

May 9 – Héma-Québec releases a seroprevalence study that estimates that over 25% of Quebec's adult population contracted COVID-19 during the first two and a half months of 2022.

May 14 – Nearly two years after it was first instated, the mask mandate for most indoor spaces ends in all of Quebec.

=== June ===
June 1 – The province's state of emergency comes to an end.

June 8 – Minister Dubé announces that masks will no longer be mandatory on public transit starting on June 18. However, it will remain mandatory in healthcare settings.

June 14 – Quebec's Emergency Assistance to Small and Medium-Sized Businesses program and Temporary Concerted Action Program for Businesses program, both of which offered financial aid to businesses affected by the pandemic, come to an end.

June 18 – Masks on public transit become optional.

=== August ===
August 16 – As part of a renewed vaccination campaign, fifth doses become available to those aged 75 and up.

August 22 – Fifth doses become available to those aged 60 and up and to people aged 12 and up who are immunocompromised.

August 29 – Fifth doses become available to all adults in Quebec.

=== November ===
November 13 – Driven by rising cases of respiratory viruses among children, as well as waning immunity to COVID-19, the Collège des médecins du Québec reinstates its recommendation to wear masks in public spaces.

November 16 – Echoing recent suggestions from medical and professional organizations around the country, Minister Dubé recommends to Quebecers to wear masks in crowded public spaces. However, the previous day, Premier Legault ruled out reintroducing the mask mandate, at least in the short-term.

November 24 – The latest data from the INSPQ reveals that the BQ.1.1 subvariant of the Omicron variant now constitutes about a third of new cases of COVID-19 in Quebec.

== 2023 ==
=== January ===
January 18 – The Quebec government limits its recommendation to get booster shots to at-risk groups, including people aged 60 and over, RPA and CHSLD residents, people who are immunocompromised or on dialysis, healthcare workers, pregnant women, and adults who live in isolated regions. Previously, booster shots had been recommended to everyone for whom it had been six months or more since their last dose.

=== February ===
February 1 – Access to prescriptions of the antiviral drug Paxlovid is expanded to include fully vaccinated people who are at risk of complications, or whose last vaccine dose was administered over six months ago.

February 2 – The recommendation to get a booster shot is limited even further, now applying only to those who have never been infected with COVID-19.

=== April ===
April 7 – The Quebec government drops the mask mandate in healthcare settings. However, individual facilities may still choose to require it.

=== May ===
May 15 – Pharmacies stop offering COVID-19 rapid tests for free to Quebecers, excluding immunosuppressed adults, people aged 60 and over, pregnant women, and adults living with a chronic illness. A charge of $20 CAD will now apply.

=== September ===
September 28 – Dr. Luc Boileau announces that a new round of automnal vaccinations for both the flu and COVID-19 will become available on October 2 for those residing in long-term care homes, and on October 10 for everyone else.

=== November ===
November 10 – The Quebec Ministry of Health and Social Services recommends that vulnerable Quebecers get a single dose of the new COVID-19 vaccine adapted for new variants, regardless of how many other vaccine doses they have had or how many times they have contracted COVID-19. However, they still recommend waiting six months since your last COVID-19 infection before getting vaccinated.
