= Jeff Chiba Stearns =

Canadian animator and filmmaker

- Occupations: Animator; Film director; Film producer; Author; Illustrator
- Writing career
- Period: 2001-present
- Genre: Animation
- Notable works: "What Are You Anyway?"; "Yellow Sticky Notes"; "Ode to a Post-it Note"; "One Big Hapa Family"; "Mixed Match"; "On Being Yukiko"
- Website: meditatingbunny.com

Jeff Chiba Stearns is a Canadian independent animation and documentary filmmaker who works in traditional and computer-based techniques.

== Biography ==
Chiba Stearns was born in Kelowna, British Columbia, of European and Japanese heritage. He is a distant cousin of renowned historian Sir Peter Stearns. After graduating from the Emily Carr Institute with a Bachelor of Media Arts majoring in Film animation, he went on to obtain a Bachelor of Education from University of British Columbia.

== Filmmaking ==
In 2001, Chiba Stearns founded Meditating Bunny Studio Inc., now based in Vancouver and formally in Kelowna.

His short animated films, The Horror of Kindergarten (2001) and Kip and Kyle (2000) were screened at film festivals and were bought and aired by the Canadian Broadcasting Corporation (CBC) for their show ZeD. His 2005 autobiographical animated short, What Are You Anyway? was created on a pre-license fee from the CBC and explores issues of growing up half-Japanese and half-Caucasian in a small Canadian town. It has screened at over 40 international film festivals, and won the award for Best Animated Short Subject at the Canadian Awards for the Electronic & Animated Arts.

Chiba Stearns also writes and lectures about Hapa and mixed-race identity, cultural awareness, and the animation process. He coined the term "Hapanimation" to describe his unique blend of North American and Japanese animation styles. In 2011, he co-founded Hapa-palooza, a Vancouver cultural festival celebrating mixed-roots arts and ideas. For the festival, he curates, Mixed Flicks, a showcase of films made by multiethnic filmmakers and panel with mixed-race actors and media makers.

His 2007 animated short film, Yellow Sticky Notes, won the Prix du Public at the Clermont-Ferrand International Short Film Festival and Best Animated Short Film at the Calgary International Film Festival. It was animated with just a black pen on over 2,300 sticky notes, and is a reflection on the filmmaker's tendency to become overwhelmed with "to do" lists made up of yellow sticky notes. The film has screened in over 80 International Film Festivals and won 10 awards. After the film's international premiere at the 2008 Tribeca Film Festival, Yellow Sticky Notes, became one of the first films acquired by YouTube's Screening Room. Yellow Sticky Notes was nominated for a 2012 Emmy® Award for Best Human Interest Feature/Segment after it aired as part of the KCTS program Reel Northwest.

Chiba Stearns's first feature-length documentary and animation hybrid, One Big Hapa Family, released September 2010, explores the lives of children of all ages from interracial marriages and how they perceive their mixed-race identities at a young age. The documentary begins after a realization that Chiba Stearns has at a family reunion which sets him on a journey of self-discovery to find out why everyone in his Japanese-Canadian family married inter-racially after his grandparents’ generation. The film has since gone on to screen at over 20 film festivals and win 6 awards. One Big Hapa Family has also screened at many North American universities including Harvard, Yale, Columbia, and Cornell.

On top of filmmaking, Chiba Stearns's animation studio, Meditating Bunny Studio Inc., has created commercials and viral videos for clients such as 3M, Generali, and Sharpie. In 2010, his short animated film, Ode to a Post-it Note, won the Webby Award for Best Branded Entertainment at the 15th Annual Webby Awards. The film was commissioned by 3M Canada to celebrate the 30th anniversary of the Post-it Note and features Post-it Note inventor, Arthur Fry. Chiba Stearns also directed the Sharpie Pens commercial "The Proposal" in 2010.

As a follow-up to his 2007 animation, Yellow Sticky Notes, Chiba Stearns has assembled 15 influential independent animators from across Canada to participate in a collaborative anijam entitled, Yellow Sticky Notes | Canadian Anijam. To create the film, the animators are asked to utilize what Chiba Stearns has coined "animation meditation" to self reflect by only drawing on 4x6 inch sticky notes. The film has since gone on to screen at over 60 international film festivals including Hot Docs and Ottawa International Animation Festival.

Chiba Stearns' second feature-length documentary, Mixed Match (2016), explores the complexities multiethnic people with rare blood diseases face when trying to find bone marrow donors. The film has screened at over 30 international film festivals and won 5 audience awards as well as the Best of the Northwest Award at the Spokane International Film Festival and the Grand Prix for Best Documentary at the Houston Asian American Pacific Islander Film Festival.

In 2018, Chiba Stearns wrote and illustrated his first children's book, Mixed Critters, an ABC book of hybrid animals. In 2020, he released his second children's book, Nori and His Delicious Dreams, about a mixed Japanese Canadian boy who dreams of sleeping in foods from around the world.

Chiba Stearns collaborated with Sansei artist Lillian Michiko Blakey to co-write and illustrate the graphic novel, On Being Yukiko, released in January 2021. The book features an intergenerational story with themes of Japanese Canadian history and identity.

On September 26, 2026, Chiba Stearns delivered the 36th Annual Mortenson Distinguished Lecture entitled, Animation Meditation: 25 Years of Exploring Mixed-Race Identity and Japanese Canadian History Through Visual Storytelling, at the University of Illinois.

Chiba Stearns was the creative director and directed over 60 episodes of the hit pre-school television series, The Treebees, which has amassed millions of views on YouTube. As an educator, he currently teaches at the Emily Carr University of Art and Design and taught classical animation at the Centre for Arts and Technology.

== Awards ==
On May 1, 2010, Chiba Stearns received the annual Emily Award, honoring outstanding achievements by an Emily Carr University of Art and Design alumni, during the Convocation of Grad 2010 at the Chann Centre (UBC). At Harvard University on March 26, 2011, he was awarded the Cultural Pioneer Award presented by Harvard HAPA.

Through the philanthropy work he has done with his documentary Mixed Match, Chiba Stearns was recognized with the Schilly Award by Canadian Blood Services on September 11, 2017 in Ottawa, Ontario at their Honouring Our Lifeblood awards ceremony. Subsequently, on November 10, 2017 at the annual Be the Match Council Meeting in Minneapolis, Minnesota, Chiba Stearns along with the main subject of Mixed Match and founder of Mixed Marrow, Athena Mari Asklipiadis, were both awarded the Awareness Award for their activism and outreach created through the film.

At the closing ceremony of the 21st Vancouver Asian Film Festival on November 5, 2017, Chiba Stearns was awarded the 2017 Cultural Diversity Award for his vast catalogue of film work exploring multicultural themes and identity.

== Filmography ==
- Mixed Match (2016), Director, Executive Producer
- Cats (2014), Director, Producer
- Yellow Sticky Notes | Canadian Anijam (2013), Director, Producer
- One Big Hapa Family (2010), Director, Executive Producer
- Ode to a Post-it Note (2010), Director, Producer
- Yellow Sticky Notes (2007), Director, Producer
- "What Are You Anyways?" (2005), Director, Producer
- The horror of Kindergarten (2001), Director, Producer
- Kip & Kyle (2000), Director, Producer

== Bibliography ==
=== Graphic novels ===
- On Being Yukiko. Meditating Bunny Studio, 2021
- Tomey: The Unyielding Spirit of Tomekichi Homma. The National Coalition of Canadians Against Anti-Asian Racism, 2025
- Ojiichan's Dragon. Meditating Bunny Studio, 2026

=== Children's books ===
- Mixed Critters. Meditating Bunny Studio, 2018.
- Nori and His Delicious Dreams. Meditating Bunny Studio, 2020.
