= Gran Centenario =

Mexican luxury tequila

Gran Centenario is a Mexican luxury tequila created in 1857 by Lázaro Gallardo. Gallardo was also the distiller, who was founder of the Selección Suave process.

== History ==
The founder of Gran Centenario was Lázaro Gallardo, a tavern owner in Tequila, Jalisco in Mexico. He is credited as a pioneer of tequila-making art because he created a process of blending tequilas that were rested in oak together with tequilas that were aged for much longer to make unique taste profiles. The brand is over 160 years old and is still family-owned. While Gallardo's process of crafting tequila at his tavern started in 1857, it was not until 1895 that Gran Centenario was launched. In the 1920s, Gallardo's son, Luciano, designed the bottle that was inspired by the then popular Art Deco style. This is also when the Angel of Independence was placed on the bottle and the legend of the angel formalized.

== Products and production ==
As of 2026, Gran Centenario offered Plata, Reposado, Extra Añejo, Cristalino tequilas.

== In popular culture ==
In 2023, Gran Centenario partnered with Mexican actor and former footballer Cristo Fernández. The brand is involved in a sponsorship of the Mexico national football team.
