= Yellow Sticky Notes =

- Directed by: Jeff Chiba Stearns
- Written by: Jeff Chiba Stearns
- Produced by: Jeff Chiba Stearns
- Edited by: Jeff Chiba Stearns
- Music by: Genevieve Vincent
- Production company: Meditating Bunny Studio
- Release date: 2007
- Running time: 6 minutes
- Country: Canada
- Language: English

Yellow Sticky Notes is a 2007 animated short film by Canadian artist Jeff Chiba Stearns. The film uses a series of sticky note papers to tell the events that happened to the filmmaker and the rest of the world during nine years.

== Awards ==
- 2009 Prix du Public Labo (Audience Award Lab Competition): 31st Clermont-Ferrand Short Film Festival
- 2009 Golden Pencil Award for Best 2d Animation: 2d or not 2d Animation Festival
- 2009 Best Animated Short Film: Beloit International Film Festival
- 2008 Best Animated Short Film: Calgary International Film Festival
- 2008 Best Animated Short Subject : Canadian Awards for the Electronic & Animated Arts
- 2008 Platinum Remi Award Winner for Best Animated (Classic Cel Animation): 41st WorldFest - Houston Remi Awards
- 2008 Golden Sheaf Award for Best Animation and Nominated for Best Director Fiction: Yorkton Short Film and Video Festival
- 2008 Special Mention for Animated Short: Fantasia Film Festival
- 2007 Animasian Award for Best Animated Film: 11th Toronto Reel Asian International Film Festival
