= Mixed Match =

- Directed by: Jeff Chiba Stearns
- Written by: Jeff Chiba Stearns
- Produced by: Ruth Vincent, Jeff Chiba Stearns
- Cinematography: Jeff Chiba Stearns
- Edited by: Jeff Chiba Stearns
- Music by: Genevieve Vincent
- Production company: Meditating Bunny Studio
- Release date: October 2016 (Vancouver International Film Festival)
- Running time: 96 minutes
- Country: Canada
- Language: English

Mixed Match is a 2016 animated/live-action documentary film directed by Canadian director Jeff Chiba Stearns. The documentary explores the challenges multi-ethnic blood disease patients face when trying to find a bone marrow match for transplant.

== Awards and nominations ==
=== Awards ===
- 2016 Audience Choice Award, Best Overall Feature: 20th Toronto Reel Asian International Film Festival
- 2016 National Bank People's Choice Award, Best Overall Feature: 20th Vancouver Asian Film Festival
- 2016 Runner-up – Audience Award: 17th San Diego Asian Film Festival
- 2017 Best of the Northwest Feature Award: 19th Spokane International Film Festival
- 2017 Audience Award – Documentary: 35th CAAMFest
- 2017 Audience Award – North American Documentary Feature: 33rd Los Angeles Asian Pacific Film Festival
- 2017 Grand Jury Award – Best Documentary Feature Film: 13th Houston Asian American Pacific Islander Film Festival
- 2017 Audience Award – Documentary & Special Jury Mention: 13th 16th Asian American Film Festival of Dallas
- 2017 Audience Award – Documentary Feature: 10th Austin Asian American Film Festival

=== Nominations ===
- 2017 Nominated for Best Feature Length Documentary: Leo Awards 2011
- 2017 Nominated for Best Screenwriting in a Feature Length Documentary: Leo Awards 2017
- 2017 Nominated for Best Picture Editing in a Feature Length Documentary: Leo Awards 2017
- 2017 Nominated for Best Sound in a Feature Length Documentary: Leo Awards 2017
- 2017 Nominated for Best Cinematography in a Feature Length Documentary: Leo Awards 2017
- 2017 Nominated for Best Direction in a Feature Length Documentary: Leo Awards 2017
