= Canadian Plasma Resources =

Canadian bio-pharmaceutical company

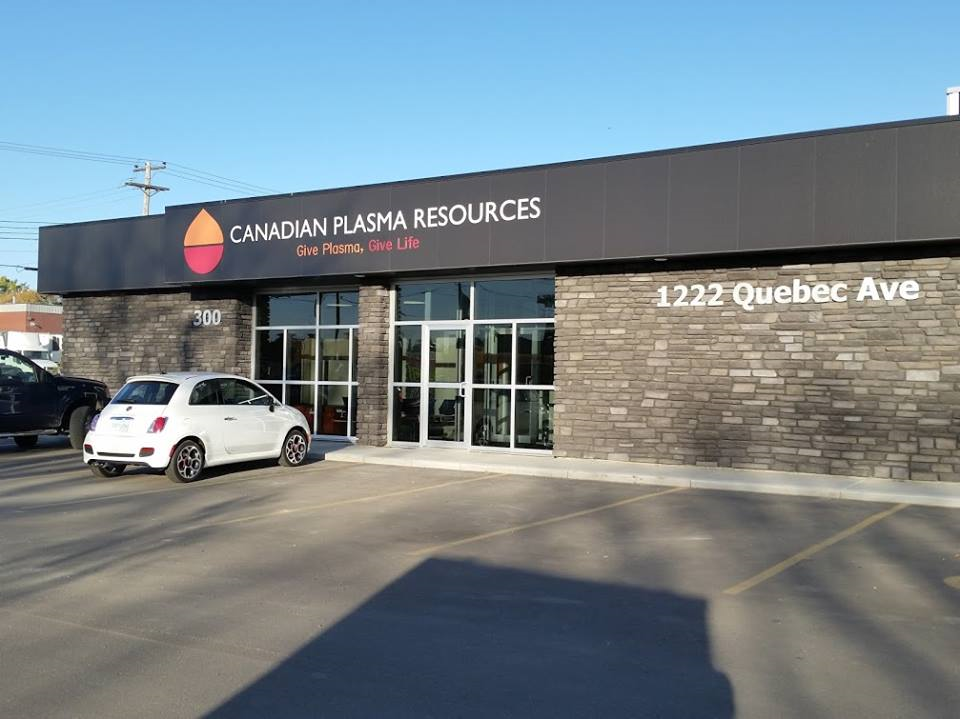
- Canadian Plasma Resources, Saskatoon, Saskatchewan
- Abbreviation: CPR
- Formation: 2012
- Type: Private
- Purpose: bio-pharmaceutical production
- Headquarters: Canada
- Location: Saskatoon, Moncton, Calgary, Edmonton, Winnipeg, Oakville
- Key people: Dr. Barzin Bahardoust, CEO
- Staff: 140
- Website: www.giveplasma.ca
- Remarks: Producer of source plasma and plasma proteins

Canadian Plasma Resources (CPR) is a private, for-profit bio-pharmaceutical company and a licensed blood establishment based in Saskatoon, Saskatchewan, Canada. It was founded in 2012 and specializes in the collection of source plasma for further manufacturing and contract-manufacturing of plasma-based bio-pharmaceuticals with operations in Saskatoon (Saskatchewan), Moncton (New Brunswick), Calgary, Edmonton (Alberta), Winnipeg (Manitoba) and administrative office in Oakville, Ontario. CPR is one of the only four establishments in Canada that are licensed to collect plasma. The others are Canadian Blood Services (CBS), Hema-Quebec and Cangene, now owned by ProMetic Life Sciences Inc.

== History ==
Canadian Plasma Resources is the first private blood establishment company established in Canada for the sole purpose of collecting high quality plasma from healthy donors for further manufacturing. Initially, CPR had planned to base its operation in the Greater Toronto and Hamilton Area. As a result, CPR established two plasma collection centers in Toronto. Both of these centers obtained authorization from the Biologic and Genetic Therapies Directorate of Health Canada and were granted establishment licenses in 2014. Like similar operations in the US and some European countries, CPR provides compensation for the donor's time. This resulted in significant controversy centered around the paid donor model and created a divide in the medical community. At the request of the government of Ontario, Health Canada organized a public consultation and concluded that donor compensation is not a safety concern. Therefore, it will not prohibit donor compensation. In spite of this, in 2014, the government of Ontario introduced legislation specifically to prohibit CPR from operating in Ontario. Several stakeholders including the Canadian Blood Services (CBS) and many patient organizations argued that prohibiting pay-for-plasma would harm patients. However, this did not change the position of the Ontario government. By that time, CPR had already received strong support from several other Canadian provincial governments citing Canada's over-reliance on other countries with paid donor models for procurement of plasma products. In 2015, CPR decided to relocate its operation to Saskatchewan. The company's first facility in Saskatchewan received Health Canada license in early 2016 and was formally opened on February 18, 2016, by Minister Dustin Duncan, Saskatchewan's minister of Health. On July 17, 2017, CPR received Health Canada license for its second facility which opened during the same month in Moncton, New Brunswick. In 2017, Health Canada established an Expert Panel to provide an evidence-based assessment of the sustainability of Canada's immune globulin supply in an increasingly competitive global market, and of the potential impact on the blood supply if private plasma collection expanded significantly in Canada. The final report was published in March 2018. The report concluded that Canada needs to do more to collect plasma and take other steps to enhance self-sufficiency in meeting the needs of its citizens. The panel also found no compelling data to suggest that expansion of source plasma collection – whether with paid or unpaid donors - has negatively impacted the whole blood supply. However, it cautioned that this is an issue which should be further researched, and it requires ongoing oversight and vigilance.

== Operations ==
Canadian Plasma Resources is a source member of the Plasma Protein Therapeutics Association and its facilities are certified through the International Quality Plasma Program. CPR plasma collection facilities are located in Saskatoon and Moncton. Plasma collection is done through automated apheresis. To ensure donor and product safety, each center is operated under the responsibility of a licensed physician, and certain tasks are delegated by the physician to registered nurses. Plasma from these operations can only be used for further manufacturing into therapies such as immunoglobulin, human albumin and blood coagulation factors, which are among the World Health Organization's list of essential medicines. This collected plasma cannot be used for direct transfusion into patients. CPR is licensed by Health Canada for component preparation and testing. Health Canada is considered a leader in blood safety regulations as recognized by the World Health Organization.

== Products ==
- Normal and Hyperimmune Source plasma for further manufacturing (licensed by Health Canada)
- Intravenous Immunoglobulin (not licensed in Canada at the moment)
