= One Big Hapa Family =

- Directed by: Jeff Chiba Stearns
- Written by: Jeff Chiba Stearns
- Produced by: Ruth Vincent
- Cinematography: Jason Woodford, Jeff Chiba Stearns
- Edited by: Jeff Chiba Stearns
- Music by: Genevieve Vincent
- Production company: Meditating Bunny Studio
- Release date: October 2010 (Calgary Film Festival)
- Running time: 85 minutes
- Country: Canada
- Language: English

One Big Hapa Family is a 2010 live-action/animated documentary film directed by Canadian director Jeff Chiba Stearns. The documentary explores aspects that influence most Japanese-Canadians to marry inter-racially and how the mixed Japanese generation perceives its multiracial identity.

== Awards and nominations ==
=== Awards ===
- 2010 NFB Best Canadian Film and Video Award: Toronto Reel Asian International Film Festival
- 2010 Closing Night Film: Vancouver Asian Film Festival
- 2011 Opening Night Film: DisOrient Asian American Film Festival of Oregon
- 2011 Best Documentary Award: Trail Dance Film Festival
- 2011 Opening Night Film: AmérAsia International Film Festival
- 2011 Closing Film: Mixed Roots Film and Literary Festival
- 2011 Rising Star Award – Documentary Competition: Canada Film Festival
- 2011 Edith Lando Peace Prize: Reel 2 Real International Film Festival for Youth
- 2011 Special Jury Award, Documentary: Outstanding Cinematography: Los Angeles Asian Pacific Film Festival
- 2011 Special Jury Award, Documentary: Outstanding Editing: Los Angeles Asian Pacific Film Festival
- 2011 Best Film Featuring a Person with a Mixed Background: Mixed Roots Film and Literary Festival 2011
- 2011 Best Historically Accurate Depiction of the Mixed Experience: Mixed Roots Film and Literary Festival 2011

=== Nominations ===
- 2011 Nominated for Best Multicultural: Yorkton Film Festival
- 2011 Nominated for Best Short Documentary Program: Leo Awards 2011
- 2011 Nominated for Best Screenwriting in a Documentary Program or Series: Leo Awards 2011
- 2011 Nominated for Best Picture Editing in a Documentary Program or Series: Leo Awards 2011
- 2011 Nominated for Best Musical Score in a Documentary Program or Series: Leo Awards 2011
