= In Flight (film) =

American action drama film

- Directed by: Bo Youngblood
- Screenplay by: John Ierardi; Drew McAnany
- Produced by: Bo Youngblood; John Ierardi; Drew McAnany
- Starring: Cristo Fernández; Tiffany Smith; Maria Russell
- Cinematography: Dan Watt
- Music by: Genevieve Vincent
- Production companies: Espectro Mx Films; Showdown Productions; Popternative Pictures; Aero Mock-Ups
- Distributed by: Gravitas Ventures
- Release date: November 8, 2024
- Running time: 91 minutes
- Country: United States
- Language: English

In Flight is a 2024 American thriller film directed and produced by Bo Youngblood in her feature film directorial debut. It is written and produced by John Ierardi and Drew McAnany. It stars Tiffany Smith, Maria Russell and Cristo Fernández, who is also an executive producer.

== Synopsis ==
Claire Reynolds meets Marco, a mysterious stranger, the night before she takes a dream trip to Paris. She then awakes on a plane in flight with no memory of how she got there.

== Cast ==
- Cristo Fernández as Marco
- Tiffany Smith as Claire
- Maria Russell
- Ashley Jones
- Scott Dean
- Alisa Allapach
- Sandi McCree
- Brandon Morales
- Darren Weiss
- Daniel Robaire
- Kelsie McDonald
- Tiagz

== Production ==
The film is produced by Showdown Productions and Espectro Mx Films. John Ierardi and Drew McAnany wrote and produced the project, from Ieraedi's story. Bo Youngblood directed and produced. Cristo Fernández starred and was an executive producer. Principal photography finished in July 2023.

== Release ==
Gravitas Ventures acquired worldwide rights in May 2024.

Releases November 8th, exclusively at LOOK Cinema in Glendale, CA.
