= Genevieve Vincent =

Canadian composer

Genevieve Vincent is a Canadian composer who works in both the Canadian and American film and television industries. She is most noted for her work on the 2024 documentary film The Stand, for which she received a Canadian Screen Award nomination for Best Original Music in a Documentary at the 14th Canadian Screen Awards in 2026.

== Solo work ==
In 2026 Vincent released Soft Sciences, her solo EP, recorded at Greenhouse Studios in Reykjavik, Iceland, and created through improvisation with modular synthesizers, electronic textures, and voice.

== Filmography ==
- Yellow Sticky Notes - 2007
- Kevin's Friend - 2009
- Ode to a Post-It Note - 2010
- One Big Hapa Family - 2010
- The Jew of Malta - 2012
- Yellow Sticky Notes: Canadian Anijam - 2013
- Mixed Match - 2016
- The Love Trials - 2018
- Way of the Hunter - 2018
- Because We Are Girls - 2019
- Now Is the Time - 2019
- In the Key of Love - 2019
- Lady Parts - 2019
- Moving Art - 2019
- A Christmas to Cherish - 2019
- Love in Store - 2020
- Have You Forgotten Me? - 2020
- The Broken Hearts Gallery - 2020
- Holly & Ivy - 2020
- Safer at Home - 2021
- You Had Me at Aloha - 2021
- What Happened, Brittany Murphy? - 2021
- Let's Get Married - 2021
- Fantasy Island - 2021-23
- U-Run - 2022
- Gutsy - 2022
- A Motorcycle Saved My Life - 2022
- The Climate Pledge Presents: Future Forward - 2023
- The Stand - 2024
- Audrey's Children - 2024
- In Flight - 2024
- Have You Heard Judi Singh? - 2025
- Time of Death - 2025
- When the Cold Wind Blows - 2025
- My Knitting Circle - 2026
- Christine Sinclair: Kind of a Big Deal 2026
