= Hapa-palooza =

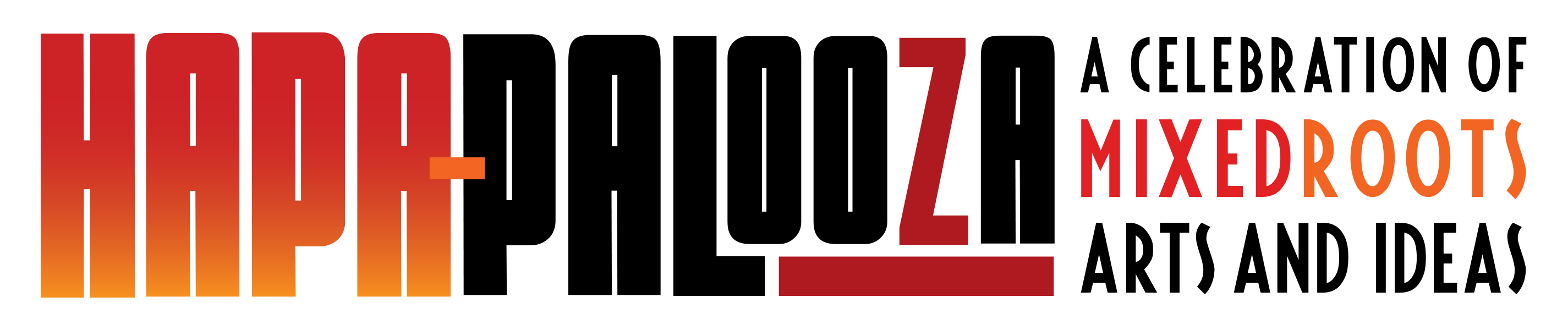
- Frequency: Annually
- Locations: Vancouver, BC
- Years active: 7
- Inaugurated: September 7, 2011; 15 years ago
- Website: hapapalooza.com

Hapa-palooza is an annual cultural arts festival held in Vancouver, British Columbia, Canada. The name of the festival is a reference to the Hawaiian word 'hapa', meaning part or half, which is used as a broad term to describe people of mixed ancestry. It features art exhibitions, performances, panels, films, and a family picnic in the park. The purpose of the festival is to cultivate community and conversation among people identifying as having mixed heritage, to generate public awareness, and to provide positive role models for the next generation.

== History ==
Conceived at the 2010 Gung Haggis Fat Choy dinner in Vancouver, BC, Hapa-palooza was co-founded by author, Anna Ling Kaye, filmmaker, Jeff Chiba Stearns and promoter, Zarah Martz in 2011. The inaugural festival ran from September 7 to 10, 2011. Hapa-palooza, run by the Hybrid Ancestry Public Arts Society, is the first mixed roots festival in Canada and is currently one of the largest festivals celebrating mixed heritage in the world.

== Awards ==
On Sunday, June 4, 2017, Hapa-palooza was presented the exploreASIAN Community Recognition Award at the Vancouver Asian Heritage Month Society's honourASIAN Gala, held at the Museum of Vancouver.

In 2014, the festival began hosting the Hip Hapa Hooray awards night. In 2015, recipients of the award included Lawrence Hill for Lifetime Achievement, Margaret Gallagher for Community Builder, and Tamo Campos for Youth Achievement.

In 2016, they included Minelle Mahtani for Community Builder, Elder Larry Grant for Lifetime Achievement, and Director X for Innovator Award.

In 2017, recipients included Joel Watanabe for the Trailblazer Award, Ann Marie Fleming for the Innovation Award, and Wayde Compton for the Community Builder Award.
