= Cristo Fernández =

Mexican actor and footballer (born 1991)

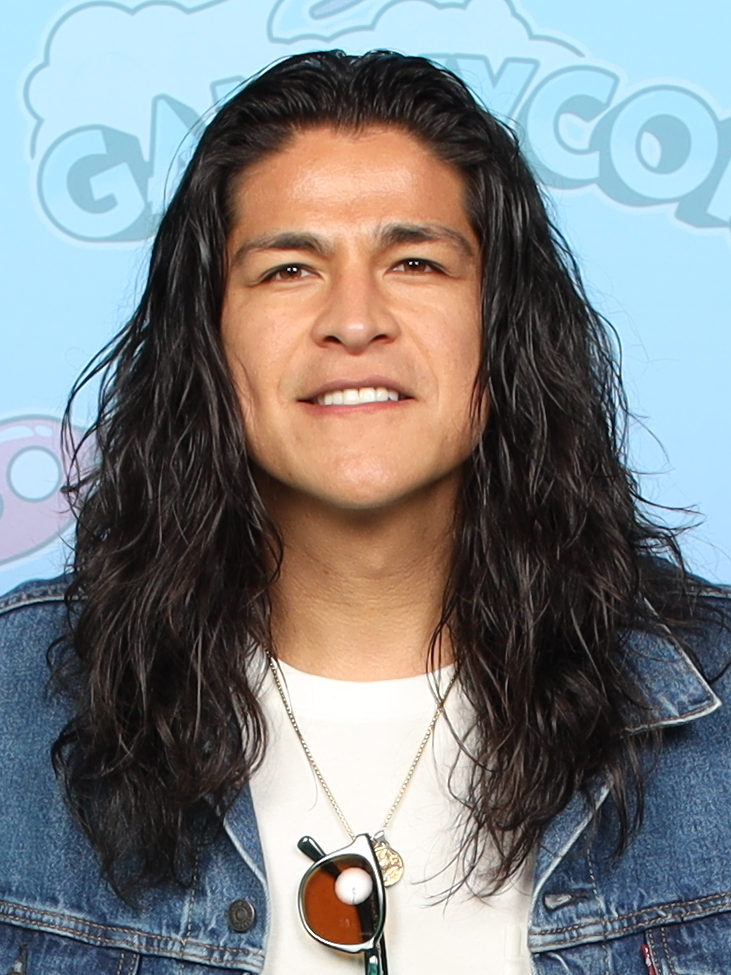
- Fernández at GalaxyCon Richmond in 2024
- Born: Cristóbal Fernández González; 27 January 1991 (age 35); Guadalajara, Jalisco, Mexico
- Education: Universidad del Valle de Atemajac (BA); Guildford School of Acting (MA)
- Occupations: Actor; footballer
- Years active: 2016–present
- Notable work: Ted Lasso
- Height: 1.78 m (5 ft 10 in)
Association football career
- Position: Forward
Team information
- Current team: El Paso Locomotive
- Number: 91
Youth career
- Estudiantes Tecos
Senior career*
Years	Team	Apps	(Gls)
- Corsarios de Valle del Grullo
- Guayama
2026–	El Paso Locomotive	1	(0)
- * Club domestic league appearances and goals as of 3 October 2026

Cristóbal Fernández González (born 27 January 1991) is a Mexican actor and professional footballer who plays as a forward for USL Championship club El Paso Locomotive. He is best known for playing Dani Rojas in the Apple TV+ series Ted Lasso (2020–2023).

Fernández has also played roles in the films Spider-Man: No Way Home (2021), Transformers: Rise of the Beasts (2023), Venom: The Last Dance (2024), and Sonic the Hedgehog 3 (2024).

== Early life ==
Cristóbal Fernández was born on 27 January 1991, in Guadalajara, Jalisco.

== Acting career ==
Fernández fell in love with acting while in college, and further pursued acting after moving to London. Following a stint in several indie films, he was cast in the Apple TV+ comedy series Ted Lasso, in which he played Dani Rojas across the first three seasons.

He is also the co-founder of film production company Espectro MX Films.

Starting in 2024, Fernández has featured in the State Farm commercial "Bundle is Life" alongside Patrick Mahomes.

He also played a small part in Sonic the Hedgehog 3 (2024).

In the German-language Swiss sitcom Unsere kleine Botschaft, Fernandez plays the local embassy staff member Fernando. Fernandez speaks fluent German and is not dubbed.

In 2025, he was featured in the English and Spanish commercial for Old Spice Swagger deodorant "Mantente fresco con Cristo Fernandez", "Underfreshtimated".

== Football career ==
=== Early career ===
Fernández found a love for football at a young age, and joined the youth teams of Guadalajara's Estudiantes Tecos at the age of 15. He later played in the Tercera División for Corsarios de Valle del Grullo, and had a stint with Guayama in Puerto Rico, before a knee injury ultimately ended his professional career. With the encouragement of his parents, Fernández decided to pursue acting as a second career.

=== El Paso Locomotive ===
In early 2026, Fernández pursued a return to professional football. He trained with Chicago Fire II, the reserve side of Major League Soccer club Chicago Fire, before trialing with USL Championship side El Paso Locomotive. He logged approximately 30 minutes for the club in a pre-season friendly against New Mexico United. On 12 May 2026, El Paso signed Fernández to a professional contract. On 11 July 2026, he made his debut for the club against New Mexico in the USL Cup after being subbed in for Rubio Rubin in the 79th minute.

== Personal life ==
Fernández has a younger sister, Paloma Cinco, an actress, model and entrepreneur. She appeared as Maria Rojas, Dani Rojas' sister, in the fourth season of Ted Lasso.

== Career statistics ==
As of match played 3 October 2026

Appearances and goals by club, season and competition
Club	Season	League			U.S. Open Cup		USL Cup		Total	
Club	Season	Division	Apps	Goals	Apps	Goals	Apps	Goals	Apps	Goals
El Paso Locomotive	2026	USL Championship	1	0	0	0	1	0	2	0
Career total			1	0	0	0	1	0	2	0

== Filmography ==
=== Film ===
Year	Title	Role	Notes
2016	Bizet	Son	Short film
2016	Treintona, soltera y fantástica	Mesero	
2017	Fuera De Serie	Guillermo	Short film
2018	New Message Received	Ben	Short film
2018	Intermitente	Erick González (Boxer)	Short film
2019	Distract-MEME	Quirky Man	Short film
2019	The Great Travel Experiment: Brisbane, Australia	Guide Assistant	Short film
2019	Vainilla Por La Noche	Papá (Alcohólico Agresivo)	Short film
2019	Çdo Çast	Shpirti Amë (Native American Spirit)	Short film
2019	TraducLations	Paco	Short film
2019	Puedo Explicarlo	Felipe	Short film
2019	Method in Madness	Hamlet	Short film
2019	El Hada de Las Chelas	Max	TV movie
2020	Smoked	Rico	Short film
2020	Intruso	Eduardo	Short film
2020	Mis Mejores Días	Eric	Short film
2020	Jaguar	Jaguar	Short film
2021	Me Enredas - Xias	Paco	Video short
2021	When You Are Gone	Waiter 1	
2021	Jano	Javier	Short film
2021	Distance	Francisco	Short film
2021	Don't Go to School Tomorrow	Rafa	
2021	Who Speaks Love	Paco	
2021	Creatures	Jorge	
2021	Spider-Man: No Way Home	Bartender	
2023	Transformers: Rise of the Beasts	Wheeljack	
2024	The Casagrandes Movie	Chipiri (voice)	
2024	Corina	Carlos	
2024	Venom: The Last Dance	Bartender (MCU) / (SSU)	
2024	Sonic the Hedgehog 3	Juan / Pablo	Cameos
2025	Alexander and the Terrible, Horrible, No Good, Very Bad Road Trip	Chavo	
TBA	In Flight	Marco	Post-production

=== Television ===
Year	Title	Role	Notes
2020–2023	Ted Lasso	Dani Rojas	(Seasons 1-3)
2024	Zorro	Po-mahn-kwakurr / Zorro	Episodes 1 & 2
2024	Acapulco	Gustavo (Season 3)	Episode 3
2025	Unsere kleine Botschaft	Fernando (Season 1)	
2025	Phineas and Ferb	Himself	Voice, episode "Bend It Like Doof"
2026	Hey A.J.!	Claudio	Voice, episode "Independence Day"

== Awards and nominations ==
Year	Association	Category	Project	Result	Ref.
2021	Imagen Awards	Best Supporting Actor – Television (Comedy)	Ted Lasso	Nominated	
2022	Screen Actors Guild Awards	Outstanding Performance by an Ensemble in a Comedy Series	Ted Lasso	Won	
2023	Hollywood Music in Media Awards	Song – Onscreen Performance (TV Show/Limited Series)	"So Long, Farewell" (from Ted Lasso)	Nominated	
2024	Screen Actors Guild Awards	Outstanding Performance by an Ensemble in a Comedy Series	Ted Lasso	Nominated	
