= Héma-Québec =

Quebecois non-profit organization

- Formation: 1998; 28 years ago
- Type: Non-profit
- Headquarters: 4045, boulevard Côte-Vertu; Saint-Laurent, Quebec; H4R 2W7
- Region served: Quebec
- Official language: French and English
- Key people: Nathalie Fagnan, President and CEO
- Parent organization: Quebec Ministry of Health and Social Services
- Budget: 2024–2025 Annual Revenue: CA$586 million
- Staff: 1900
- Volunteers: Over 200,000 donors of biologic products and thousands of volunteers
- Website: www.hemaquebec.ca/en

Héma-Québec is a non-profit organization that supplies blood and other biological products of human origin to hospitals for the Canadian province of Quebec. The organization's headquarters is located in the Montreal borough of Saint-Laurent, Quebec, and it was created on March 26, 1998, as a successor to the Canadian Red Cross Blood Program and the Canadian Blood Agency on recommendation of the Krever Commission.

As a supplier, Héma-Québec is responsible for recruiting donors and for collecting, testing and processing the blood products, and delivering them to hospitals.

Supplying cell and tissue products to hospitals is also an important component of its mandate. Héma-Québec is responsible for the Stem Cell Donor Registry for Quebec and for the first public cord blood bank operating in Canada. It also collects, processes and distributes human tissues such as corneas, skin, bones, heart valves and tendons, and manages the only public human tissue bank in Quebec.

Héma-Québec also manages the only public mothers' milk bank in Quebec, whose purpose is to meet the needs of very premature newborns. It recruits and screen donors and then processes and tests the milk and distributes it to hospitals.

== Plasmavie - plasma donor lounges ==
In November 2013, the first Plasmavie lounge specialized in collecting plasma opened its doors in Trois-Rivières. Since then, Héma-Québec has opened additional Plasmavie centres in Sherbrooke, Gatineau and Saguenay. The Saguenay and Gatineau centres also have space dedicated to whole blood donations. Plasmavie centres collect plasma by apheresis.

Plasma collected at the centres is processed to manufacture drugs such as immunoglobulins, which are used, for example, in the treatment of patients with immune system deficiencies.

Under the supervision of Héma-Québec, plasma is also fractionated and transformed into medications that are sold to Québec hospitals in the same way as standard blood products.

== Human tissues ==
Héma-Québec works to raise awareness among the public and hospital professionals about the importance of referring deceased donors for the collection of human tissues, including corneas. Héma-Québec also collects the tissues, transforms them and distributes them to hospitals.

== Cord blood bank ==
Héma-Québec manages Québec's only public cord blood bank. The organization recruits cord blood donor mothers, trains teams of midwives and obstetricians, and qualifies, transforms and stores the cord blood.

== Mothers' milk bank ==
Since spring 2014, Héma-Québec has also been providing mothers’ milk to mothers of premature babies who are unable to breastfeed their newborn child.

== Board directors and committees ==
Héma-Québec's board of directors is composed of representatives of blood donation volunteers, hospital transfusion physicians, hospital administrators, the public health system, the research and business communities, and blood product recipients, as well as the organization's president and CEO, Nathalie Fagnan. All members of the Board of Directors—with the exception of the president and CEO—are appointed by the Québec government following consultation with various authorities representing stakeholders in the transfusion chain. The president and CEO is appointed by Héma-Québec's board of directors. The Board receives recommendations from three advisory committees:

- Safety Advisory Committee
- Scientific and Medical Advisory Committee
- Recipient Representatives Advisory Committee

== See also ==
- Blood Donation
- Canadian Plasma Resources
- Canadian Blood Services - a separate organization operates elsewhere in Canada
- List of blood donation agencies
