= Canadian Blood Services =

Canadian health non-profit

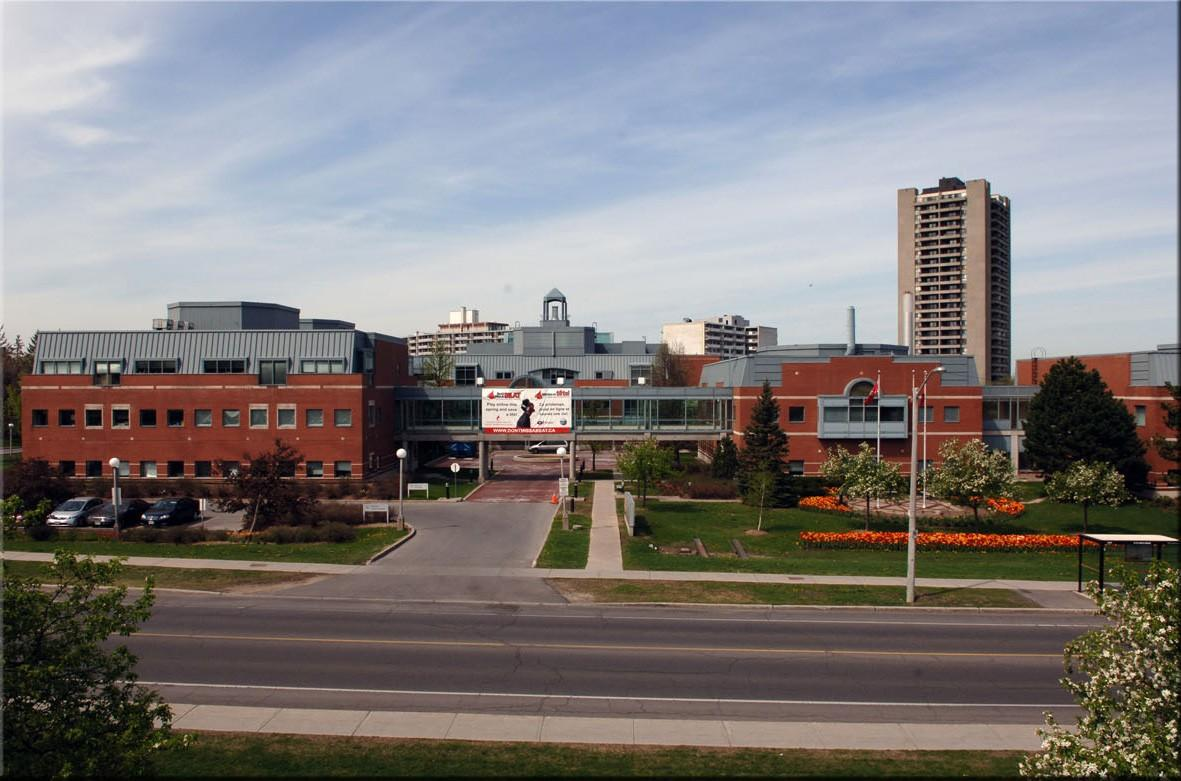
- The Canadian Blood Services head office building in Ottawa, Ontario
- Formation: 1998; 28 years ago
- Type: Non-profit
- Headquarters: Ottawa, Ontario, Canada
- Region served: Canada
- Chief executive officer: Dr. Graham D. Sher
- Revenue: ▲CAD $1.37 billion (2023)
- Expenses: ▲CAD $1.38 billion (2023)
- Staff: ~3,900 (2024–2025)
- Volunteers: 4,180 (2023)
- Website: blood.ca

Canadian Blood Services (French: Société canadienne du sang) is a non-profit charitable organization that is independent from the Canadian government. The Canadian Blood Services was established as Canada's blood authority in all provinces and territories except for Quebec in 1998. The federal, provincial and territorial governments created the Canadian Blood Services through a memorandum of understanding. Canadian Blood Services is funded mainly through the provincial and territorial governments.

Canadian Blood Services is a health-care system that is part of Canada's broader network of systems, and it is currently the only organization that is funded by Canada's provincial and territorial governments for manufacturing biological products. In addition to providing blood and blood products, the organization also provides transfusion and stem cell registry services on behalf of all provincial and territorial governments besides Quebec. All provinces and territories are able to access the national transplant registry for inter-provincial organ sharing and related programs.

It has a unique relationship with Héma-Québec, the provincial blood system operator that provides products to patients and manages Quebec's stem cell donor registry. The two organizations work closely to share blood products in times of need and collaborate regularly to share information, insights and data.

There are several reasons why individuals can be deferred from donating blood, including intravenous drug use, living in the UK for certain periods of time, coming from an HIV-endemic country, and engaging in activities that confer a high risk of HIV.

Canadian Blood Services has been criticized for moving away from an unpaid voluntary donor model towards a commercial model based on monetary incentives for donation.

== Blood testing ==
Canadian Blood Services has a multi-tiered system to measure the safety of their blood supply. Before donating, donors are first screened for their health.

The screening process for prospective donors includes:

- Making sure the donor is healthy by asking if they have the flu, sore throat, fever or infection
- What medications the donor is taking
- If they have had a vaccination within the last three months
- Questions about their medical history
- Questions about their travel history
- Questions about their lifestyle

Once the blood is donated, it must then go through testing for infectious diseases, including but not limited to HIV and hepatitis. Blood is also surveyed to monitor transmittable diseases in blood donors, investigated for possible transfusion-transmitted infections in blood recipients, and scanned for potential emerging pathogens that may pose a risk in the present or future. All these safety measures are done to protect blood recipients.

== Blood donation from men who have had sex with men ==
Policies that banned gay men from donating blood and tissues were first introduced around the world in the mid-1980s. These policies were introduced after the emergence of several reported cases of severe immune deficiency among gay men in the United States at the end of 1981. In June 1982, an increase in the cases of immune deficiency was reported among several groups of gay men in Southern California. This led many to believe that the cause of the immune deficiency was linked to the sexual transmission of infections agents. Furthermore, because many thought that the immune deficiency was only prevalent among gay men, the disease was initially called Gay-Related Immune Deficiency (or GRID). Hence, in the mid-1980s, the predecessor of the Canadian Blood Services—the Canadian Red Cross Blood Transfusion Service—introduced a blood donor restriction on men who have had sex with men (MSM) as of 1977, on the grounds of protecting the blood supply from HIV infection.

In 2006, Canadian Blood Services began conducting a thorough review of the blood donor restrictions on MSM; however, in 2007, the board of directors concluded that the restrictions were to be maintained. Upon this conclusion, Canadian Blood Services was encouraged to continue gathering more information on the subject. In 2010, the Ontario Superior Court—in response to the Charter of Rights and Freedoms challenge which was launched in 2002—ruled that the deferral criteria for MSM were not discriminatory as they were based on health and safety considerations. In 2011, the Canadian Blood Services' board of directors approved plans to remove the permanent deferral for MSM, and instead, agreed towards a defined term of not more than 10 years but less than five years since last sexual contact.

On May 22, 2013, Canadian Blood Services announced that the deferral period as prescribed and enforced by Health Canada for MSM would be decreased from a ban for "even once since 1977" to "five years from last MSM [sexual] activity" by the summer of 2013. The new policy came into effect on July 22, 2013. In June 2016, Canadian Blood services announced that Health Canada had approved its request to shorten the MSM ban from five years to one year, with this policy change to take effect on August 15, 2016. In 2019, Canadian Blood Services amended their policy again, after Health Canada had approved their request to reduce the waiting period for MSM donors from one year to three months. Canadian Blood Services plans to remove the ban by the end of 2021.

In April 2022, the Canadian Blood Services announced that by September 30, 2022, the 3-month deferral period would be scrapped and replaced with a policy inquiring if donors engage in any higher-risk sexual behaviours, regardless of sexuality. Monogamous individuals would be able to donate blood without any waiting period whatsoever. The UK has a similar blood donation rules implemented in 2021.

On September 11, 2022, this new sexual behaviour-based screening was implemented for all donors, regardless of gender or sexual orientation. The previous questions regarding MSM were replaced by two new questions. The first asks whether the donor had a new sexual partner in the last 3 months, and the second, whether they had more than one sexual partner in the same period. If the answer is yes to any of the two questions, then there is a follow-up that asks whether they had anal sex in the same period. If they have, then a 3-month deferral period is required.

=== MSM policy reasoning ===
Canadian Blood Services aims to keep their policies as minimally restrictive while also keeping their blood supply safe. Data from HIV in Canada-Surveillance Report in 2017 stated that MSM adults are the largest portion of new HIV infection in Canada at 46.4%. Eligibility is determined by the most current evidence-based research available. Canadian Blood Services stated that the 3-month waiting period existed because HIV is not detectable shortly after infection with their current testing technologies.

=== MSM policy criticism ===
Many critics say that Canadian Blood Services should be using a screening model that evaluates risky behaviour that may result in HIV, not based on an individual's sexuality. If a gay man is having unprotected anal sex in a committed monogamous relationship, they are less likely to be HIV positive than a man with secondary sex partners. All donations go through HIV testing and the approximate nine-day window where HIV goes undetected is the same for a gay man and a heterosexual man.

=== MSM policy change ===
In September 2022, the Canadian Blood Services renounced their previous policies on MSM, opting instead for a gender and sexual orientation-neutral questionnaire that only asks if the donor had anal sex with new or multiple partners in the previous 3 months. Canadian Blood Services stated that the long period for the implementation of the new sexual behaviour-based screening was due to a strict evidence-gathering process that was later delivered to Health Canada for approval. Canadian Blood Services also justified the new focus on anal sex with new or multiple partners by stating these sexual behaviours statistically increase the chance of HIV transmission per sex act, compared to vaginal and oral sex.

=== MSM Research Grant Program ===
The Canadian Blood Services, in partnership with Héma-Québec, manages the MSM Research Grant Program. This program is funded by contributions from Health Canada, which has made a $3-million investment in the research program. The objective of the MSM Research Grant Program is to generate a body of evidence-based research to help develop and inform alternative screening approaches for blood or plasma donors, thereby helping to ensure a more inclusive donor screening process for the Canadian blood system. The MSM Research Grant program is anticipated to help evolve and inform the current eligibility criteria for MSM, while maintaining and ensuring the safety of the Canadian blood supply. As of November 2018, the MSM Research Grant Program funds a total of 15 research projects.

== Blood donation from trans individuals ==
Previously, there was ambiguity regarding the screening process for trans donors before the national criteria were implemented. On August 15, 2016, Canadian Blood Services' new eligibility criteria for transgender people came into effect. According to these criteria:

- Donors who have had lower gender affirming surgery will be deferred from donating blood for three months after their surgery. They will then be screened in their affirmed gender after three months.
- Donors who have not had lower gender affirming surgery will be asked questions based on their sex assigned at birth and will be eligible to donate or be deferred based on these criteria.

There is currently little research done on the trans population in Canada; however, the Centres for Disease Control and Prevention has summarized information from the U.S. and European countries stating that the prevalence of HIV in trans women in the U.S. and other high-income countries is 22 to 28 percent. Canadian Blood Services' two main risk factors for trans donors include:

- Risk of Transfusion-related acute lung injury (TRALI), particularly from trans men. It is more likely for donors who have had pregnancies in the past to have antibodies present in their blood plasma that can cause TRALI in a recipient, which is rare but potentially fatal. In order to reduce this risk, instead of transfusing plasma protein from donors at risk for TRALI directly to patients, their plasma are used to produce plasma protein products.
- Trans individuals in Canada are not included in a separate risk category in the HIV and AIDS annual reports by the Public Health Agency of Canada. Therefore, trans women donors who have not had lower gender affirming surgery are placed in a higher-risk category if they have had a male sexual partner.

In an effort to receive input from the LGBTQ community regarding the policies put in place for both MSM and trans donors, several consultations with this community have occurred. Two in-person consultations with trans and gender non-binary communities took place: one on Nov. 17, 2016 in Vancouver, and one on Dec. 8, 2016 in Toronto.

== Services offered ==
The Canadian Blood Services provides services in four main areas: blood, plasma, stem cells, and organs and tissues. Collection services vary across Canada, but typical services include: whole blood collection, plasmapheresis, plateletpheresis, and stem cell and bone marrow collection and matching.

Whole blood collection is the shortest process of those listed above and at over 850,000 units collected per year, is the primary blood collection service offered by Canadian Blood Services. About 450 mL (1 United States liquid pint) of blood is collected during a blood donation. For a typical donor this represents about ten percent of their total blood supply.

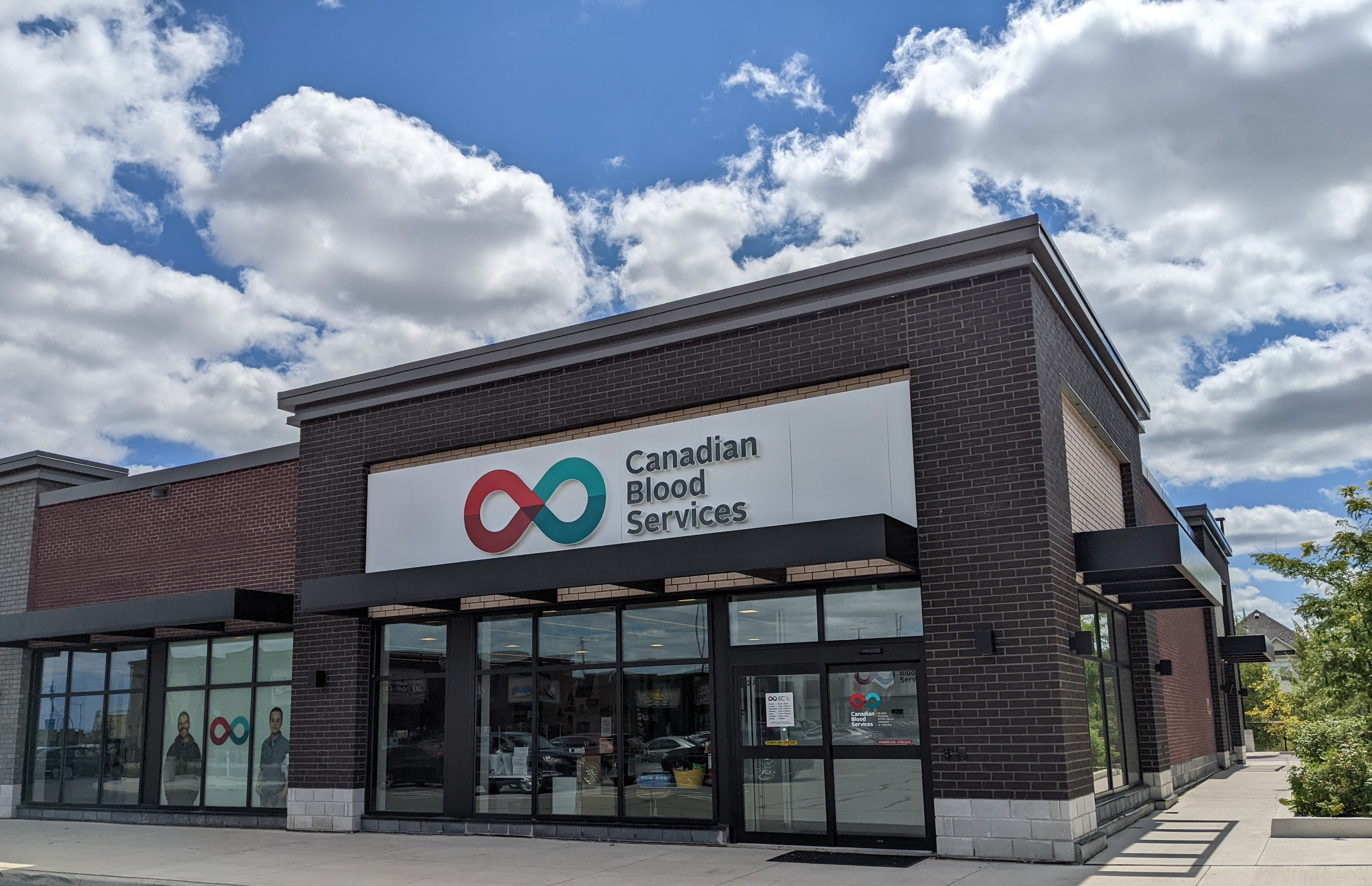
Canadian Blood Services in Brampton, Ontario. This donor centre is dedicated to plasma donation only.

=== Blood ===
The Canadian Blood Services collects, tests, and manufactures blood and blood products. These blood products are distributed to the hospitals which the organization serves in order to meet the clinical needs of individual patients. Canadian Blood Services also work in conjunction with provincial and territorial governments throughout Canada to meet the needs of patients throughout the country.

=== Plasma ===
Canadian Blood Services collects plasma from volunteer, unpaid donors across Canada. A majority of the donated plasma is used for a process called fractionation, where plasma is manufactured into plasma-derived products which are used to treat bleeding disorders, burns, and immune deficiencies. Collected plasma is also used to meet the transfusion needs of Canadian patients. In addition to these activities, one of the responsibilities of the organization is to monitor the amount of human plasma available to meet the needs of patients across Canada.

==== Demand for plasma ====
There is a growing demand for plasma in Canada in order to increase the amount available to manufacture medications which use proteins present in human plasma. As of 2019, there is not enough plasma collected in Canada to meet the demands of the country. The amount of plasma that the Canadian Blood Services collects only meets 13-14% of the demand for immune globulin. Hence, the vast majority of plasma used in Canada are from finished products that the organization purchases using plasma from paid donors in the United States. Approximately 80% of Canada's immune globulin is imported from the United States.

Authority is delegated to the provinces and territories in Canada to decide how they wish to collect plasma in their respective jurisdictions. While some provinces prohibit private clinics and companies from paying their plasma donors, some clinics located in Winnipeg, Manitoba, have been paying their plasma donors for thirty years. In order to provide Canadians with a secure supply of source plasma to address potential shortages or threats to the Canadian system, the Canadian Blood Services, therefore, has identified increasing their plasma donations as an active priority. However, as a not-for-profit organization, the Canadian Blood Services continues to stand by their current policy regarding plasma donors, in that they shall only collect plasma from voluntary, unpaid donors.

As of 2019, the organization has stated that they are currently working to develop a collections model to significantly increase their plasma collections through voluntary donations.

=== Stem cells ===
Canadian Blood Services operates a stem cell program to aid patients who have diseases or disorders that are treatable with stem cell transplants. Manufacturing of stem cells is done through the collection of cord blood, to then be put in the cord blood bank. Canadian Blood Services also operates a national registry of potential adult stem cell donors, which is part of a network of other international donor registries. Human leukocyte antigen typing is also a service provided to assure that the matches between donors and receivers of stem cells are the best as possible.

==== Cord Blood Bank ====
Cord blood is the blood remaining in the umbilical cord and placenta after a baby is delivered. Cord blood contains an abundance of stem cells, and is capable of treating several genetic diseases, blood disorders, and immune deficiencies. It is useful in the treatment of over eighty diseases ad disorders, some of which include leukaemia, lymphoma, and sickle cell disease. After transplantation, donated stem cells that are deemed healthy replace damaged stem cells in a patient's bone marrow and immune system.

In 2015, the Canadian Blood Services launched the Cord Blood Bank. The inception of the Cord Blood Bank came about after provincial and territorial ministries of health across Canada (with the exception of Quebec) committed to the establishment of an ethnically diverse, national, and publicly funded stem cell bank obtained from umbilical cord blood. In order to fulfill this commitment, a $48-million investment was made, of which the Canadian Blood Services pledged to raising $12.5-million in public funding. From this pledge, the Canadian Blood Services underwent its first fundraising campaign For All Canadians, through which they obtained over $12.5 million, exceeding their initial goal. Today, the Canadian Blood Services' Cord Blood Bank exists as a national, public health-care resource offered at four locations across Canada:

- The Ottawa Hospital General Campus, Ottawa, Ontario
- The William Osler Health System's Brampton Civic Hospital, Brampton, Ontario
- The Alberta Health Services' Lois Hole Hospital for Women, Edmonton, Alberta
- The B.C. Women's Hospital & Health Centre, Vancouver, British Columbia

===== Demand for stem cells =====
In Canada, there has been a steadily increasing demand for stem cells. Half of the patients in Canada requiring a stem cell donor, however, are without a match. Furthermore, patients from ethnically diverse backgrounds seeking stem cell donors presents a challenge as oftentimes, a patient's best match is someone of similar ancestry. As of 2019, only thirty-one percent of the roughly 440,000 donors in Canada's stem cell registry are ethnically diverse—a figure that decreases to only three percent when examining those who are of mixed race.

=== Organs and tissues ===
The Canadian Blood Services works closely with the Organ and Tissue Donation & Transplantation community to help facilitate inter-provincial organ sharing, and to improve national system performance in this area. This is done via the provision of professional education resources, the development and sharing of leading practices, increasing public awareness, and through data analysis and reporting. As part of their role, they also manage a national transplant registry for inter-provincial organ sharing, operate the national organ waitlist, and manage related programs for organ donation and transplantation.

Since 2008, the federal, provincial, and territorial governments have invested more than $70-million to support the Canadian Blood Services and their work with the organ and tissue donation and transplantation system. In April, 2019, it was announced by Ginette Petitpas Taylor, Minister of Health, that an additional $3.4-million in funding was to be delegated towards the Canadian Blood Services over the span of two years to help improve the organ and tissue donation and transplantation system in Canada.

==== Kidney paired donation program ====
In Canada, there are currently 23 living kidney donation and transplant donation programs involved with the kidney paired donation program. The kidney paired donation program is operated collaboratively between Canadian Blood Services and Canada's living kidney donation and kidney transplant programs.

Any healthy adult can be assessed to become a potential living kidney donor. Usually, donors wish to donate to a friend or family member if they are compatible, in which case the kidney paired donation program is not used. However, if they do not have a patient in mind to donate to, the kidney paired donation program can be used.

Canadian Blood Services manages the Canadian Transplant Registry to match living kidney donors to those in need of transplants. They also play a role in facilitating the communication between the donor and patient to keep kidney donor chains going as fast as possible. In addition, they collaborate with the Kidney Transplant Advisory Committee to review each donor chain to make sure that high priority cases receive adequate attention and that the chain is progressing.

===== Demand for kidney transplants =====
Currently, waiting times for deceased donor kidney transplants in Canada average about four to five years, with some patients never receiving a transplant. Those who are waiting for a kidney transplant make up approximately 78% of the organ transplant waiting list. In 2017, approximately 3379 Canadians were on the waiting list for a kidney transplant.

== See also ==
- Canadian Plasma Resources
- Héma-Québec
- List of blood donation agencies
- Blood Donation
