= List of awards and nominations received by Ted Lasso =

Awards and nominations received by Ted Lasso
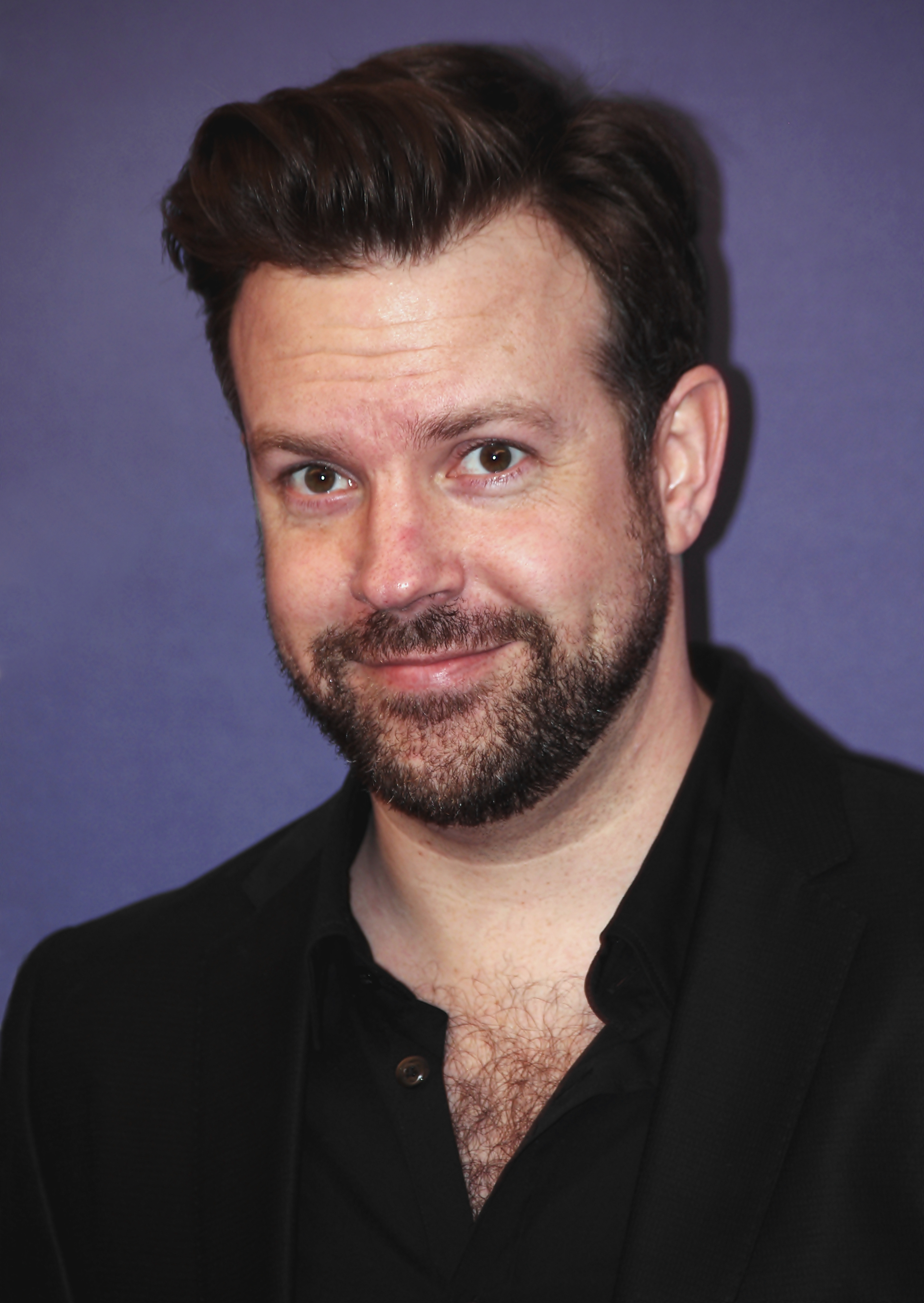
- Jason Sudeikis has received multiple awards for his performance as Ted Lasso.
Awards and nominations
Award	Wins	Nominations
AACTA International Awards	0	2
American Cinema Editors Awards	1	4
American Film Institute Awards	2	2
Annie Awards	0	1
Art Directors Guild Awards	0	1
Cinema Audio Society Awards	0	2
Critics' Choice Television Awards	7	8
Directors Guild of America Awards	0	7
Golden Globe Awards	2	9
Golden Reel Awards	0	4
Golden Trailer Awards	1	4
Hollywood Critics Association TV Awards	4	20
Hollywood Music in Media Awards	0	1
ICG Publicists Awards	1	1
MTV Movie & TV Awards	0	3
NAACP Image Awards	0	2
Peabody Awards	1	1
People's Choice Awards	0	1
Primetime Emmy Awards	11	61
Producers Guild of America Awards	1	3
Satellite Awards	0	1
Screen Actors Guild Awards	3	11
TCA Awards	3	7
Writers Guild of America Awards	2	4

Totals (Note: Certain award groups do not simply award one winner. They acknowledge several different recipients, have runners-up, and have third place. Since this is a specific recognition and is different from losing an award, runner-up mentions are considered wins in this award tally. For simplification and to avoid errors, each award in this list has been presumed to have had a prior nomination.)
- Wins: 39
- Nominations: 138

Ted Lasso is an American sports comedy-drama television series developed by Jason Sudeikis, Bill Lawrence, Brendan Hunt, and Joe Kelly. The series is based on the character played by Sudeikis in a series of NBC Sports promotional videos. The first season, consisting of 10 episodes, was broadcast on Apple TV+ from August 14 to October 2, 2020. The 12-episode second season aired from July 23 to October 8, 2021. Apple renewed the series for a third season in October 2020.

For its first season, Ted Lasso was nominated for 20 Primetime Emmy Awards, winning seven including Outstanding Comedy Series and Outstanding Lead Actor in a Comedy Series for Sudeikis. In total, the show has been nominated for 61 Primetime Emmy Awards in its run. The show has also received a Producers Guild of America Award, three Screen Actors Guild Awards, and two Writers Guild of America Awards, as well as nominations for five Directors Guild of America Awards. From critics' groups, the series has received two Golden Globe Awards, seven Critics' Choice Television Awards, and three TCA Awards.

== Awards and nominations ==
Awards and nominations received by Ted Lasso
Award	Year (Note: The listed year refers to the date of the ceremony, not necessarily the year in which the corresponding season or episode aired.)	Category	Nominee(s)	Result	Ref.
AACTA International Awards	2022	Best Comedy Series	Ted Lasso	Nominated	
AACTA International Awards	2022	Best Actor in a Series	Jason Sudeikis	Nominated	
AARP Movies for Grownups Awards	2021	Best TV Series	Ted Lasso	Nominated	
AARP Movies for Grownups Awards	2022	Best TV Series	Ted Lasso	Won	
American Cinema Editors Awards	2021	Best Edited Comedy Series for Non-Commercial Television	A.J. Catoline (for "The Hope That Kills You")	Nominated	
American Cinema Editors Awards	2021	Best Edited Comedy Series for Non-Commercial Television	Melissa McCoy (for "Make Rebecca Great Again")	Won	
American Cinema Editors Awards	2022	Best Edited Comedy Series for Non-Commercial Television	A.J. Catoline (for "No Weddings and a Funeral")	Nominated	
American Cinema Editors Awards	2022	Best Edited Comedy Series for Non-Commercial Television	Melissa McCoy (for "Rainbow")	Nominated	
American Film Institute Awards	2021	Top 10 Television Programs	Ted Lasso	Won	
American Film Institute Awards	2022	Top 10 Television Programs	Ted Lasso	Won	
Annie Awards	2023	Best Sponsored Production	Ted Lasso Presents: The Missing Christmas Mustache	Nominated	
Art Directors Guild Awards	2022	Excellence in Production Design for a Half Hour Single-Camera Television Series	Paul Cripps (for "Carol of the Bells", "Man City", "Beard After Hours")	Nominated	
Artios Awards	2022	Television Pilot and First Season – Comedy	Theo Park and Olissa Rogers	Won	
Artios Awards	2023	Outstanding Achievement in Casting – Television Comedy Series	Theo Park	Nominated	
Black Reel Awards	2022	Outstanding Writing, Comedy Series	Ashley Nicole Black (for "Do the Right-est Thing")	Nominated	
Black Reel Awards	2022	Outstanding Guest Actor, Comedy Series	Sam Richardson	Nominated	
Celebration of Black Cinema and Television	2021	Breakthrough Actor – Television	Toheeb Jimoh	Won	
Cinema Audio Society Awards	2021	Outstanding Achievement in Sound Mixing for Television Series – Half Hour	David Lascelles, Ryan Kennedy, Sean Byrne, Brent Findley, Marilyn Morris, George Murphy and Jordan McClain (for "The Hope That Kills You")	Nominated	
Cinema Audio Society Awards	2022	Outstanding Achievement in Sound Mixing for Television Series – Half Hour	David Lascelles, Ryan Kennedy, Sean Byrne, Brent Findley, Jamison Rabbe, Arno Stephanian (for "Rainbow")	Nominated	
Critics' Choice Television Awards	2021	Best Comedy Series	Ted Lasso	Won	
Critics' Choice Television Awards	2021	Best Actor in a Comedy Series	Jason Sudeikis	Won	
Critics' Choice Television Awards	2021	Best Supporting Actress in a Comedy Series	Hannah Waddingham	Won	
Critics' Choice Television Awards	2022	Best Comedy Series	Ted Lasso	Won	
Critics' Choice Television Awards	2022	Best Actor in a Comedy Series	Jason Sudeikis	Won	
Critics' Choice Television Awards	2022	Best Supporting Actor in a Comedy Series	Brett Goldstein	Won	
Critics' Choice Television Awards	2022	Best Supporting Actress in a Comedy Series	Hannah Waddingham	Won	
Critics' Choice Television Awards	2024	Best Supporting Actor in a Comedy Series	Phil Dunster	Nominated	
Dorian Awards	2021	Best TV Comedy	Ted Lasso	Nominated	
Dorian Awards	2021	Best TV Performance	Jason Sudeikis	Nominated	
Dorian Awards	2022	Best TV Musical Performance	Hannah Waddingham and cast, "Never Gonna Give You Up"	Nominated	
Directors Guild of America Awards	2021	Outstanding Directorial Achievement in Comedy Series	Zach Braff (for "Biscuits")	Nominated	
Directors Guild of America Awards	2021	Outstanding Directorial Achievement in Comedy Series	MJ Delaney (for "The Hope That Kills You")	Nominated	
Directors Guild of America Awards	2022	Outstanding Directorial Achievement in Comedy Series	MJ Delaney (for "No Weddings and a Funeral")	Nominated	
Directors Guild of America Awards	2022	Outstanding Directorial Achievement in Comedy Series	Erica Dunton (for "Rainbow")	Nominated	
Directors Guild of America Awards	2022	Outstanding Directorial Achievement in Comedy Series	Sam Jones (for "Beard After Hours")	Nominated	
Directors Guild of America Awards	2024	Outstanding Directorial Achievement in Comedy Series	Erica Dunton (for "La Locker Room Aux Folles")	Nominated	
Directors Guild of America Awards	2024	Outstanding Directorial Achievement in Comedy Series	Declan Lowney (for "So Long, Farewell")	Nominated	
Golden Globe Awards	2021	Best Television Series – Musical or Comedy	Ted Lasso	Nominated	
Golden Globe Awards	2021	Best Actor – Television Series Musical or Comedy	Jason Sudeikis	Won	
Golden Globe Awards	2022	Best Television Series – Musical or Comedy	Ted Lasso	Nominated	
Golden Globe Awards	2022	Best Actor in a Television Series – Musical or Comedy	Jason Sudeikis	Won	
Golden Globe Awards	2022	Best Supporting Actor – Series, Miniseries or Television Film	Brett Goldstein	Nominated	
Golden Globe Awards	2022	Best Supporting Actress – Series, Miniseries or Television Film	Hannah Waddingham	Nominated	
Golden Globe Awards	2024	Best Television Series – Musical or Comedy	Ted Lasso	Nominated	
Golden Globe Awards	2024	Best Actor in a Television Series – Musical or Comedy	Jason Sudeikis	Nominated	
Golden Globe Awards	2024	Best Supporting Actress – Series, Miniseries or Television Film	Hannah Waddingham	Nominated	
Golden Reel Awards	2021	Outstanding Achievement in Sound Editing – Live Action Under 35 Minutes	Brent Findley, Kip Smedley, Bernard Weiser, Sharyn Gersh, Richard Brown, Jordan McClain, Sanaa Kelley & Matt Salib (for "The Hope That Kills You")	Nominated	
Golden Reel Awards	2022	Outstanding Achievement in Sound Editing – Series 1 Hour – Comedy or Drama – Dialogue and ADR	Brent Findley, Bernard Weiser, Kip Smedley (for "Rainbow")	Nominated	
Golden Reel Awards	2022	Outstanding Achievement in Sound Editing – Series 1 Hour – Comedy or Drama – Sound Effects and Foley	Brent Findley, Kip Smedley, Mark Cleary, Jordan McClain, Arno Stephanian, Sanaa Kelley, Matt Salib (for "Beard's Night Out")	Nominated	
Golden Reel Awards	2022	Outstanding Achievement in Sound Editing – Series 1 Hour – Comedy or Drama – Music	Richard David Brown, Sharyn Gersh (for "Rainbow")	Nominated	
Golden Trailer Awards	2021	Best Wildposts for a TV/Streaming Series	Ted Lasso	Won	
Golden Trailer Awards	2022	Best Comedy Poster	Ted Lasso: Season 2, Apple TV+, Apple TV+	Nominated	
Golden Trailer Awards	2022	Best Viral Campaign for a TV/Streaming Series	Ted Lasso, Apple Inc., Ignition Creative	Nominated	
Golden Trailer Awards	2022	Best BTS/EPK for a TV/Streaming Series (Over 2 minutes)	Ted Lasso: Season 2 “The Lasso Way”, Apple TV+, Outpost Media	Nominated	
Hollywood Critics Association TV Awards	2021	Best Streaming Series, Comedy	Ted Lasso	Won	
Hollywood Critics Association TV Awards	2021	Best Actor in a Streaming Series, Comedy	Jason Sudeikis	Won	
Hollywood Critics Association TV Awards	2021	Best Supporting Actor in a Streaming Series, Comedy	Brett Goldstein	Won	
Hollywood Critics Association TV Awards	2021	Best Supporting Actor in a Streaming Series, Comedy	Brendan Hunt	Nominated	
Hollywood Critics Association TV Awards	2021	Best Supporting Actor in a Streaming Series, Comedy	Nick Mohammed	Nominated	
Hollywood Critics Association TV Awards	2021	Best Supporting Actor in a Streaming Series, Comedy	Jeremy Swift	Nominated	
Hollywood Critics Association TV Awards	2021	Best Supporting Actress in a Streaming Series, Comedy	Juno Temple	Nominated	
Hollywood Critics Association TV Awards	2021	Best Supporting Actress in a Streaming Series, Comedy	Hannah Waddingham	Won (Note: Tied with Hannah Einbinder for Hacks)	
Hollywood Critics Association TV Awards	2022	Best Streaming Series, Comedy	Ted Lasso	Won	
Hollywood Critics Association TV Awards	2022	Best Actor in a Streaming Series, Comedy	Jason Sudeikis	Nominated	
Hollywood Critics Association TV Awards	2022	Best Supporting Actor in a Streaming Series, Comedy	Brett Goldstein	Won	
Hollywood Critics Association TV Awards	2022	Best Supporting Actor in a Streaming Series, Comedy	Toheeb Jimoh	Nominated	
Hollywood Critics Association TV Awards	2022	Best Supporting Actor in a Streaming Series, Comedy	Nick Mohammed	Nominated	
Hollywood Critics Association TV Awards	2022	Best Supporting Actress in a Streaming Series, Comedy	Juno Temple	Nominated	
Hollywood Critics Association TV Awards	2022	Best Supporting Actress in a Streaming Series, Comedy	Hannah Waddingham	Nominated	
Hollywood Critics Association TV Awards	2022	Best Directing in a Streaming Series, Comedy	MJ Delaney (for "No Weddings and a Funeral")	Nominated	
Hollywood Critics Association TV Awards	2022	Best Directing in a Streaming Series, Comedy	Declan Lowney (for "Inverting the Pyramid of Success")	Nominated	
Hollywood Critics Association TV Awards	2022	Best Writing in a Streaming Series, Comedy	Jane Becker (for "No Weddings and a Funeral")	Nominated	
Hollywood Critics Association TV Awards	2022	Best Writing in a Streaming Series, Comedy	Bill Wrubel (for "Rainbow")	Nominated	
Hollywood Critics Association TV Awards	2022	Best Short Form Animation Series	Ted Lasso Presents: The Missing Christmas Mustache	Nominated	
Hollywood Critics Association TV Awards	2023	Best Streaming Series, Comedy	Ted Lasso	Nominated	
Hollywood Critics Association TV Awards	2023	Best Actor in a Streaming Series, Comedy	Jason Sudeikis	Nominated	
Hollywood Critics Association TV Awards	2023	Best Supporting Actor in a Streaming Series, Comedy	Brendan Hunt	Nominated	
Hollywood Critics Association TV Awards	2023	Best Supporting Actor in a Streaming Series, Comedy	Brett Goldstein	Nominated	
Hollywood Critics Association TV Awards	2023	Best Supporting Actor in a Streaming Series, Comedy	Phil Dunster	Nominated	
Hollywood Critics Association TV Awards	2023	Best Supporting Actress in a Streaming Series, Comedy	Hannah Waddingham	Nominated	
Hollywood Critics Association TV Awards	2023	Best Directing in a Streaming Series, Comedy	Declan Lowney (for "So Long, Farewell")	Nominated	
Hollywood Music in Media Awards	2021 (1)	Best Original Score in a TV Show/Limited Series	Tom Howe & Marcus Mumford	Nominated	
Hollywood Music in Media Awards	2021 (2)	Best Original Score in a TV Show/Limited Series	Tom Howe & Marcus Mumford	Nominated	
Hollywood Music in Media Awards	2021 (2)	Best Music Supervision – Television	Tony Von Pervieux & Christa Miller	Won	
Imagen Awards	2021	Best Supporting Actor – Television (Comedy)	Cristo Fernández	Nominated	
ICG Publicists Awards	2022	Maxwell Weinberg Award for Television Publicity Campaign	Ted Lasso	Won	
MTV Movie & TV Awards	2021	Best Comedic Performance	Jason Sudeikis	Nominated	
MTV Movie & TV Awards	2022	Best Show	Ted Lasso	Nominated	
MTV Movie & TV Awards	2022	Best Comedic Performance	Brett Goldstein	Nominated	
NAACP Image Awards	2022	Outstanding Writing in a Comedy Series	Ashley Nicole Black (for "Do the Right-est Thing")	Nominated	
NAACP Image Awards	2022	Outstanding Writing in a Comedy Series	Leann Bowen (for "Lavender")	Nominated	
Peabody Awards	2021	Entertainment	Ted Lasso	Won	
People's Choice Awards	2021	The Comedy Show of 2021	Ted Lasso	Nominated	
People's Choice Awards	2021	The Male TV Star of 2021	Jason Sudeikis	Nominated	
People's Choice Awards	2021	The Comedy TV Star of 2021	Jason Sudeikis	Nominated	
People's Choice Awards	2021	The Bingeworthy Show of 2021	Ted Lasso	Nominated	
Primetime Emmy Awards	2021	Outstanding Comedy Series	Various (Note: Bill Lawrence, Jason Sudeikis, Jeff Ingold, Bill Wrubel, Liza Katzer, Jane Becker, Jamie Lee, Kip Kroeger, Brendan Hunt, Tina Pawlik and Joe Kelly)	Won	
Primetime Emmy Awards	2021	Outstanding Lead Actor in a Comedy Series	Jason Sudeikis	Won	
Primetime Emmy Awards	2021	Outstanding Supporting Actor in a Comedy Series	Brett Goldstein	Won	
Primetime Emmy Awards	2021	Outstanding Supporting Actor in a Comedy Series	Brendan Hunt	Nominated	
Primetime Emmy Awards	2021	Outstanding Supporting Actor in a Comedy Series	Nick Mohammed	Nominated	
Primetime Emmy Awards	2021	Outstanding Supporting Actor in a Comedy Series	Jeremy Swift	Nominated	
Primetime Emmy Awards	2021	Outstanding Supporting Actress in a Comedy Series	Juno Temple	Nominated	
Primetime Emmy Awards	2021	Outstanding Supporting Actress in a Comedy Series	Hannah Waddingham	Won	
Primetime Emmy Awards	2021	Outstanding Directing for a Comedy Series	Zach Braff (for "Biscuits")	Nominated	
Primetime Emmy Awards	2021	Outstanding Directing for a Comedy Series	MJ Delaney (for "The Hope That Kills You")	Nominated	
Primetime Emmy Awards	2021	Outstanding Directing for a Comedy Series	Declan Lowney (for "Make Rebecca Great Again")	Nominated	
Primetime Emmy Awards	2021	Outstanding Writing for a Comedy Series	Jason Sudeikis, Bill Lawrence, Brendan Hunt and Joe Kelly (for "Pilot")	Nominated	
Primetime Emmy Awards	2021	Outstanding Writing for a Comedy Series	Jason Sudeikis, Brendan Hunt and Joe Kelly (for "Make Rebecca Great Again")	Nominated	
Primetime Emmy Awards	2022	Outstanding Comedy Series	Various (Note: Bill Lawrence, Jason Sudeikis, Brendan Hunt, Joe Kelly, Jeff Ingold, Bill Wrubel, Jane Becker, Jamie Lee, Liza Katzer, Kip Kroeger, Declan Lowney, Leanne Bowen, Ashley Nicole Black and Andrew Warren)	Won	
Primetime Emmy Awards	2022	Outstanding Lead Actor in a Comedy Series	Jason Sudeikis	Won	
Primetime Emmy Awards	2022	Outstanding Supporting Actor in a Comedy Series	Brett Goldstein	Won	
Primetime Emmy Awards	2022	Outstanding Supporting Actor in a Comedy Series	Toheeb Jimoh	Nominated	
Primetime Emmy Awards	2022	Outstanding Supporting Actor in a Comedy Series	Nick Mohammed	Nominated	
Primetime Emmy Awards	2022	Outstanding Supporting Actress in a Comedy Series	Juno Temple	Nominated	
Primetime Emmy Awards	2022	Outstanding Supporting Actress in a Comedy Series	Hannah Waddingham	Nominated	
Primetime Emmy Awards	2022	Outstanding Supporting Actress in a Comedy Series	Sarah Niles	Nominated	
Primetime Emmy Awards	2022	Outstanding Directing for a Comedy Series	MJ Delaney (for "No Weddings and a Funeral")	Won	
Primetime Emmy Awards	2022	Outstanding Writing for a Comedy Series	Jane Becker (for "No Weddings and a Funeral")	Nominated	
Primetime Emmy Awards	2023	Outstanding Comedy Series	Various	Nominated	
Primetime Emmy Awards	2023	Outstanding Lead Actor in a Comedy Series	Jason Sudeikis	Nominated	
Primetime Emmy Awards	2023	Outstanding Supporting Actor in a Comedy Series	Phil Dunster	Nominated	
Primetime Emmy Awards	2023	Outstanding Supporting Actor in a Comedy Series	Brett Goldstein	Nominated	
Primetime Emmy Awards	2023	Outstanding Supporting Actress in a Comedy Series	Juno Temple	Nominated	
Primetime Emmy Awards	2023	Outstanding Supporting Actress in a Comedy Series	Hannah Waddingham	Nominated	
Primetime Emmy Awards	2023	Outstanding Directing for a Comedy Series	Declan Lowney (for "So Long, Farewell")	Nominated	
Primetime Emmy Awards	2023	Outstanding Writing for a Comedy Series	Brendan Hunt, Joe Kelly, and Jason Sudeikis (for "So Long, Farewell")	Nominated	
Primetime Creative Arts Emmy Awards	2021	Outstanding Casting for a Comedy Series	Theo Park	Won	
Primetime Creative Arts Emmy Awards	2021	Outstanding Original Main Title Theme Music	Marcus Mumford and Tom Howe	Nominated	
Primetime Creative Arts Emmy Awards	2021	Outstanding Single-Camera Picture Editing for a Comedy Series	A.J. Catoline (for "The Hope That Kills You")	Won	
Primetime Creative Arts Emmy Awards	2021	Outstanding Single-Camera Picture Editing for a Comedy Series	Melissa McCoy (for "Make Rebecca Great Again")	Nominated	
Primetime Creative Arts Emmy Awards	2021	Outstanding Production Design for a Narrative Program (Half-Hour)	Paul Cripps and Iain White (for "For the Children")	Nominated	
Primetime Creative Arts Emmy Awards	2021	Outstanding Sound Editing for a Comedy or Drama Series (Half-Hour) and Animation	Brent Findley, Bernard Weiser, Kip Smedley, Richard David Brown, Sharyn Gersh, Sanaa Kelley and Matt Salib (for "The Hope That Kills You")	Nominated	
Primetime Creative Arts Emmy Awards	2021	Outstanding Sound Mixing for a Comedy or Drama Series (Half-Hour) and Animation	Ryan Kennedy, Sean Byrne and David Lascelles (for "The Hope That Kills You")	Won	
Primetime Creative Arts Emmy Awards	2022	Outstanding Guest Actor in a Comedy Series	James Lance (for "Inverting the Pyramid of Success")	Nominated	
Primetime Creative Arts Emmy Awards	2022	Outstanding Guest Actor in a Comedy Series	Sam Richardson (for "Midnight Train to Royston")	Nominated	
Primetime Creative Arts Emmy Awards	2022	Outstanding Guest Actress in a Comedy Series	Harriet Walter (for "The Signal")	Nominated	
Primetime Creative Arts Emmy Awards	2022	Outstanding Casting for a Comedy Series	Theo Park	Nominated	
Primetime Creative Arts Emmy Awards	2022	Outstanding Production Design for a Narrative Program (Half-Hour)	Paul Cripps and Stacey Dickinson (for "Beard After Hours")	Nominated	
Primetime Creative Arts Emmy Awards	2022	Outstanding Single-Camera Picture Editing for a Comedy Series	A.J. Catoline (for "No Weddings and a Funeral")	Nominated	
Primetime Creative Arts Emmy Awards	2022	Outstanding Single-Camera Picture Editing for a Comedy Series	Melissa McCoy (for "Rainbow")	Nominated	
Primetime Creative Arts Emmy Awards	2022	Outstanding Contemporary Hairstyling	Nicky Austin and Nicola Springall (for "No Weddings and a Funeral")	Nominated	
Primetime Creative Arts Emmy Awards	2022	Outstanding Sound Editing for a Comedy or Drama Series (Half-Hour) and Animation	Various (Note: Brent Findley, Bernard Weiser, Ashley Harvey, Kip Smedley, Mark Cleary, Jordan McClain, Sharyn Gersh, Richard David Brown, Sanaa Kelley and Matt Salib) (for "Beard After Hours")	Nominated	
Primetime Creative Arts Emmy Awards	2022	Outstanding Sound Mixing for a Comedy or Drama Series (Half-Hour) and Animation	Ryan Kennedy, Sean Byrne, David Lascelles and Arno Stephanian (for "Rainbow")	Nominated	
Primetime Creative Arts Emmy Awards	2023	Outstanding Guest Actor in a Comedy Series	Sam Richardson (for "International Break")	Won	
Primetime Creative Arts Emmy Awards	2023	Outstanding Guest Actress in a Comedy Series	Becky Ann Baker (for "Mom City")	Nominated	
Primetime Creative Arts Emmy Awards	2023	Outstanding Guest Actress in a Comedy Series	Sarah Niles (for "Smells Like Mean Spirit")	Nominated	
Primetime Creative Arts Emmy Awards	2023	Outstanding Guest Actress in a Comedy Series	Harriet Walter (for "So Long, Farewell")	Nominated	
Primetime Creative Arts Emmy Awards	2023	Outstanding Casting for a Comedy Series	Theo Park	Nominated	
Primetime Creative Arts Emmy Awards	2023	Outstanding Production Design for a Narrative Contemporary Program (One Hour or More)	Paul Cripps, Iain White, and Kate Goodman (for "Sunflowers")	Nominated	
Primetime Creative Arts Emmy Awards	2023	Outstanding Single-Camera Picture Editing for a Comedy Series	A.J. Catoline and Alex Szabo (for "Mom City")	Nominated	
Primetime Creative Arts Emmy Awards	2023	Outstanding Single-Camera Picture Editing for a Comedy Series	Melissa McCoy and Francesca Castro (for "So Long, Farewell")	Nominated	
Primetime Creative Arts Emmy Awards	2023	Outstanding Contemporary Hairstyling	Nicky Austin, Nikki Springall, Sophie Roberts, and Nicola Pope (for "So Long, Farewell")	Nominated	
Primetime Creative Arts Emmy Awards	2023	Outstanding Original Music and Lyrics	"Fought & Lost" – Tom Howe, Jamie Hartman, and Sam Ryder (for "Mom City")	Nominated	
Primetime Creative Arts Emmy Awards	2023	Outstanding Original Music and Lyrics	"A Beautiful Game" – Ed Sheeran, Foy Vance, and Max Martin (for "So Long, Farewell")	Won	
Primetime Creative Arts Emmy Awards	2023	Outstanding Music Supervision	Tony Von Pervieux and Christa Miller (for "So Long, Farewell")	Nominated	
Primetime Creative Arts Emmy Awards	2023	Outstanding Special Visual Effects in a Single Episode	James MacLachlan, Bill Parker, Lenny Wilson, Gretchen Bangs, Brian Hobert, Sherry Li, Kenneth Armstrong, Ying Lin, and Neil Taylor (for "Mom City")	Nominated	
Producers Guild of America Awards	2021	Danny Thomas Award for Outstanding Producer of Episodic Television – Comedy	Various	Nominated	
Producers Guild of America Awards	2022	Danny Thomas Award for Outstanding Producer of Episodic Television – Comedy	Various	Won	
Producers Guild of America Awards	2024	Danny Thomas Award for Outstanding Producer of Episodic Television – Comedy	Ted Lasso	Nominated	
Satellite Awards	2021	Best Actor in a Musical or Comedy Series	Jason Sudeikis	Nominated	
Satellite Awards	2022	Television Series, Comedy or Musical	Ted Lasso	Won	
Satellite Awards	2022	Actress in a Series, Comedy or Musical	Hannah Waddingham	Nominated	
Satellite Awards	2022	Actor in a Series, Comedy or Musical	Jason Sudeikis	Won	
Screen Actors Guild Awards	2021	Outstanding Performance by an Ensemble in a Comedy Series	Various (Note: Annette Badland, Phil Dunster, Brett Goldstein, Brendan Hunt, Toheeb Jimoh, James Lance, Nick Mohammed, Jason Sudeikis, Jeremy Swift, Juno Temple & Hannah Waddingham)	Nominated	
Screen Actors Guild Awards	2021	Outstanding Performance by a Male Actor in a Comedy Series	Jason Sudeikis	Won	
Screen Actors Guild Awards	2022	Outstanding Performance by an Ensemble in a Comedy Series	Various (Note: Annette Badland, Kola Bokinni, Phil Dunster, Cristo Fernández, Brett Goldstein, Brendan Hunt, Toheeb Jimoh, Nick Mohammed, Sarah Niles, Jason Sudeikis, Jeremy Swift, Juno Temple, and Hannah Waddingham)	Won	
Screen Actors Guild Awards	2022	Outstanding Performance by a Male Actor in a Comedy Series	Brett Goldstein	Nominated	
Screen Actors Guild Awards	2022	Outstanding Performance by a Male Actor in a Comedy Series	Jason Sudeikis	Won	
Screen Actors Guild Awards	2022	Outstanding Performance by a Female Actor in a Comedy Series	Juno Temple	Nominated	
Screen Actors Guild Awards	2022	Outstanding Performance by a Female Actor in a Comedy Series	Hannah Waddingham	Nominated	
Screen Actors Guild Awards	2024	Outstanding Performance by an Ensemble in a Comedy Series	Various (Note: Annette Badland, Kola Bokinni, Edyta Budnik, Adam Colborne, Phil Dunster, Cristo Fernández, Kevin "KG" Garry, Brett Goldstein, Billy Harris, Anthony Head, Brendan Hunt, Toheeb Jimoh, James Lance, Nick Mohammed, Jason Sudeikis, Jeremy Swift, Juno Temple, Hannah Waddingham, Bronson Webb, and Katy Wix)	Nominated	
Screen Actors Guild Awards	2024	Outstanding Performance by a Male Actor in a Comedy Series	Brett Goldstein	Nominated	
Screen Actors Guild Awards	2024	Outstanding Performance by a Male Actor in a Comedy Series	Jason Sudeikis	Nominated	
Screen Actors Guild Awards	2024	Outstanding Performance by a Female Actor in a Comedy Series	Hannah Waddingham	Nominated	
TCA Awards	2021	Program of the Year	Ted Lasso	Won	
TCA Awards	2021	Outstanding Achievement in Comedy	Ted Lasso	Won	
TCA Awards	2021	Outstanding New Program	Ted Lasso	Won	
TCA Awards	2021	Individual Achievement in Comedy	Jason Sudeikis	Nominated	
TCA Awards	2021	Individual Achievement in Comedy	Hannah Waddingham	Nominated	
TCA Awards	2022	Outstanding Achievement in Comedy	Ted Lasso	Nominated	
TCA Awards	2022	Individual Achievement in Comedy	Jason Sudeikis	Nominated	
Visual Effects Society Awards	2024	Outstanding Supporting Visual Effects in a Photoreal Episode	Gretchen Bangs, Bill Parker, Lenny Wilson (for "Mom City")	Nominated	
Writers Guild of America Awards	2021	Comedy Series	Various (Note: Jane Becker, Leann Bowen, Brett Goldstein, Brendan Hunt, Joe Kelly, Bill Lawrence, Jamie Lee, Jason Sudeikis, Phoebe Walsh and Bill Wrubel)	Won	
Writers Guild of America Awards	2021	New Series	Various	Won	
Writers Guild of America Awards	2021	Episodic Comedy	Jason Sudeikis & Bill Lawrence & Brendan Hunt & Joe Kelly (for "Pilot")	Nominated	
Writers Guild of America Awards	2022	Comedy Series	Various (Note: Jane Becker, Ashley Nicole Black, Leann Bowen, Sasha Garron, Brett Goldstein, Brendan Hunt, Joe Kelly, Bill Lawrence, Jamie Lee, Michael Orton-Toliver, Jason Sudeikis, Phoebe Walsh, Bill Wrubel)	Nominated	
