= Directors Guild of America Award for Outstanding Directorial Achievement in Comedy Series =

Annual award for television directing

- Awarded for: Outstanding Directorial Achievement in Comedy Series
- Country: United States
- Presented by: Directors Guild of America
- First award: 1971
- Currently held by: Seth Rogen and Evan Goldberg for The Studio (2025)
- Website: www.dga.org

The Directors Guild of America Award for Outstanding Directorial Achievement in Comedy Series is one of the annual Directors Guild of America Awards given by the Directors Guild of America. It was first presented at the 24th Directors Guild of America Awards in 1972. The current eligibility period is the calendar year.

== Winners and nominees ==
=== 1970s ===
Year	Program	Episode	Winners and nominees	Network	Ref.
1971 (24th)	All in the Family	"Meet the Bunkers"	John Rich	CBS	
1971 (24th)	Mary Tyler Moore	"Baby Sit-Com"	Jay Sandrich	CBS	
1971 (24th)	The Odd Couple	"Being Divorced is Never Having to Say I Do"	Bruce Bilson	ABC	
1972 (25th)	M*A*S*H	"Pilot"	Gene Reynolds	CBS	
1972 (25th)	All in the Family	"The Bunkers and the Swingers"	John Rich	CBS	
1972 (25th)	Maude	"Maude's Dilemma"	Bill Hobin	CBS	
1973 (26th)	M*A*S*H	"Deal Me Out"	Gene Reynolds	CBS	
1973 (26th)	Mary Tyler Moore	"Lou's First Date"	Jay Sandrich	CBS	
1973 (26th)	Maude		Hal Cooper	CBS	
1974 (27th)	M*A*S*H	"Alcoholics Unanimous"	Hy Averback	CBS	
1974 (27th)	Mary Tyler Moore	"Will Mary Richards Go to Jail?"	Jay Sandrich	CBS	
1974 (27th)	Rhoda	"Rhoda's Wedding"	Robert Moore	CBS	
1975 (28th)	M*A*S*H	"Bombed"	Hy Averback	CBS	
1975 (28th)	Mary Tyler Moore	"Chuckles Bites the Dust"	Joan Darling	CBS	
1975 (28th)	Maude		Hal Cooper	CBS	
1976 (29th)	M*A*S*H	"Dear Sigmund"	Alan Alda	CBS	
1976 (29th)	Mary Tyler Moore	"Murray Can't Lose"	Jay Sandrich	CBS	
1976 (29th)	Maude	"Vivian's First Funeral"	Hal Cooper	CBS	
1977 (30th)	All in the Family	"Edith's 50th Birthday"	Paul Bogart	CBS	
1977 (30th)	M*A*S*H	"Comrades in Arms"	Alan Alda & Burt Metcalfe	CBS	
1977 (30th)	Soap	"Episode 7"	Jay Sandrich	ABC	
1978 (31st)	All in the Family	"California, Here We Are"	Paul Bogart	CBS	
1978 (31st)	M*A*S*H	"Point of View"	Charles S. Dubin	CBS	
1978 (31st)	Soap	"Episode 32"	Jay Sandrich	ABC	
1979 (32nd)	M*A*S*H	"Period of Adjustment"	Charles S. Dubin	CBS	
1979 (32nd)	All in the Family	"Too Good Edith"	Paul Bogart	CBS	
1979 (32nd)	Barney Miller	"The Judge"	Noam Pitlik	ABC	

=== 1980s ===
Year	Program	Episode	Winners and nominees	Network	Ref.
1980 (33rd)	Barney Miller	"Fog"	Noam Pitlik	ABC	
1980 (33rd)	M*A*S*H	"Death Takes a Holiday"	Mike Farrell	CBS	
1980 (33rd)	M*A*S*H	"A War for All Seasons"	Burt Metcalfe	CBS	
1981 (34th)	M*A*S*H	"The Life You Save"	Alan Alda	CBS	
1981 (34th)	M*A*S*H	"Blood Brothers"	Harry Morgan	CBS	
1981 (34th)	Taxi	"Jim the Psychic"	James Burrows	ABC	
1982 (35th)	M*A*S*H	"Where There's a Will, There's a War"	Alan Alda	CBS	
1982 (35th)	Cheers	"Sam at Eleven"	James Burrows	NBC	
1982 (35th)	Taxi	"Jim's Inheritance"	Noam Pitlik	NBC	
1983 (36th)	Cheers	"Showdown" (Part II)	James Burrows	NBC	
1983 (36th)	Buffalo Bill	"Woody Quits"	Jim Drake	NBC	
1983 (36th)	Taxi	"Louie and the Blind Girl"	Noam Pitlik	NBC	
1984 (37th)	The Cosby Show	"Pilot"	Jay Sandrich	NBC	
1984 (37th)	Cheers	"I Call Your Name"	James Burrows	NBC	
1984 (37th)	Kate & Allie	"Landlady"	Bill Persky	CBS	
1985 (38th)	The Golden Girls	"Pilot"	Jay Sandrich	NBC	
1985 (38th)	Cheers	"Birth, Death, Love and Rice"	James Burrows	NBC	
1985 (38th)	Moonlighting	"The Dream Sequence Always Rings Twice"	Peter Werner	ABC	
1986 (39th)	The Golden Girls	"Isn't It Romantic?"	Terry Hughes	NBC	
1986 (39th)	Cheers	"Tan 'N' Wash"	James Burrows	NBC	
1986 (39th)	Moonlighting	"Symphony in Knocked Flat"	Paul Lynch	ABC	
1987 (40th)	Family Ties	"A, My Name is Alex"	Will Mackenzie	NBC	
1987 (40th)	Cheers	"Home Is the Sailor"	James Burrows	NBC	
1987 (40th)	The Golden Girls	"Old Friends"	Terry Hughes	NBC	
1988 (41st)	The Wonder Years	"Pilot"	Steve Miner	ABC	
1988 (41st)	Murphy Brown	"Pilot"	Barnet Kellman	CBS	
1988 (41st)	Roseanne	"Pilot"	Ellen Falcon	ABC	
1989 (42nd)	Murphy Brown	"Brown Like Me"	Barnet Kellman	CBS	
1989 (42nd)	Cheers	"Sisterly Love"	James Burrows	NBC	
1989 (42nd)	Designing Women	"They Shoot Fat Women, Don't They?"	Harry Thomason	CBS	

=== 1990s ===
Year	Program	Episode	Winners and nominees	Network	Ref.
1990 (43rd)	Cheers	"Woody Interruptus"	James Burrows	NBC	
1990 (43rd)	Murphy Brown	"Bob & Murphy & Ted & Avery"	Barnet Kellman	CBS	
1990 (43rd)	The Wonder Years	"The Ties That Bind"	Peter Baldwin	ABC	
1991 (44th)	Murphy Brown	"Uh-Oh: Part 2"	Peter Bonerz	CBS	
1991 (44th)	Cheers	"Days of Wine & Neurosis"	James Burrows	NBC	
1991 (44th)	Seinfeld	"The Tape"	David Steinberg	NBC	
1992 (45th)	Seinfeld	"The Contest"	Tom Cherones	NBC	
1992 (45th)	Cheers	"An Old-Fashioned Wedding"	James Burrows	NBC	
1992 (45th)	Seinfeld	"The Good Samaritan"	Jason Alexander	NBC	
1993 (46th)	Frasier	"The Good Son"	James Burrows	NBC	
1993 (46th)	Dream On	"Silent Night, Holy Cow"	Betty Thomas	HBO	
1993 (46th)	Murphy Brown	"Angst for the Memory"	Peter Bonerz	CBS	
1993 (46th)	Northern Exposure	"Kaddish for Uncle Manny"	Michael Lange	CBS	
1993 (46th)	Seinfeld	"The Mango"	Tom Cherones	NBC	
1994 (47th)	Frasier	"The Matchmaker"	David Lee	NBC	
1994 (47th)	Frasier	"The Unkindest Cut of All"	Rick Beren	NBC	
1994 (47th)	The Larry Sanders Show	"The Mr. Sharon Stone Show"	Todd Holland	HBO	
1994 (47th)	Seinfeld	"The Opposite"	Tom Cherones	NBC	
1994 (47th)	Seinfeld	"The Race"	Andy Ackerman	NBC	
1995 (48th)	Mad About You	"The Alan Brady Show"	Gordon Hunt	NBC	
1995 (48th)	Frasier	"Daphne's Room"	David Lee	NBC	
1995 (48th)	Friends	"The One with the Birth"	James Burrows	NBC	
1995 (48th)	The Larry Sanders Show	"Arthur After Hours"	Todd Holland	HBO	
1995 (48th)	Seinfeld	"The Gum"	Andy Ackerman	NBC	
1996 (49th)	Seinfeld	"The Rye"	Andy Ackerman	NBC	
1996 (49th)	3rd Rock from the Sun	"See Dick Continue to Run"	Robert Berlinger	NBC	
1996 (49th)	The Larry Sanders Show	"Ellen, or Isn't She"	Alan Myerson	HBO	
1996 (49th)	The Larry Sanders Show	"Everybody Loves Larry"	Todd Holland	HBO	
1996 (49th)	Mad About You	"The Finale"	David Steinberg	NBC	
1997 (50th)	Seinfeld	"The Betrayal"	Andy Ackerman	NBC	
1997 (50th)	Dharma & Greg	"Pilot"	James Burrows	ABC	
1997 (50th)	Ellen	"The Puppy Episode"	Gil Junger	ABC	
1997 (50th)	Frasier	"Halloween" (Part I)	Pamela Fryman	NBC	
1997 (50th)	Mad About You	"The Birth"	Gordon Hunt	NBC	
1998 (51st)	Sports Night	"Pilot"	Thomas Schlamme	ABC	
1998 (51st)	Frasier	"Merry Christmas, Mrs. Moskowitz"	Kelsey Grammer	NBC	
1998 (51st)	The Larry Sanders Show	"Flip"	Todd Holland	HBO	
1998 (51st)	Just Shoot Me!	"Two Girls for Every Boy"	Pamela Fryman	NBC	
1998 (51st)	Will & Grace	"Pilot"	James Burrows	NBC	
1999 (52nd)	Sports Night	"Small Town"	Thomas Schlamme	ABC	
1999 (52nd)	Frasier	"Dr. Nora"	Katy Garretson	NBC	
1999 (52nd)	Frasier	"The Fight Before Christmas"	Pamela Fryman	NBC	
1999 (52nd)	Sex and the City	"The Man, the Myth, the Viagra"	Victoria Hochberg	HBO	
1999 (52nd)	Will & Grace	"Yours, Mine or Ours"	James Burrows	NBC	

=== 2000s ===
Year	Program	Episode	Winners and nominees	Network	Ref.
2000 (53rd)	Will & Grace	"Lows in the Mid-Eighties"	James Burrows	NBC	
2000 (53rd)	Ally McBeal	"The Last Virgin"	Bill D'Elia	Fox	
2000 (53rd)	Frasier	"And the Dish Ran Away with the Spoon"	Pamela Fryman	NBC	
2000 (53rd)	Malcolm in the Middle	"Pilot"	Todd Holland	Fox	
2000 (53rd)	Sex and the City	"Cock-a-Doodle-Do"	Allen Coulter	HBO	
2001 (54th)	Malcolm in the Middle	"Bowling"	Todd Holland	Fox	
2001 (54th)	Sex and the City	"Defining Moments"	Allen Coulter	HBO	
2001 (54th)	Sex and the City	"My Motherboard, Myself"	Michael Engler	HBO	
2001 (54th)	Sex and the City	"The Real Me"	Michael Patrick King	HBO	
2001 (54th)	Will & Grace	"Bed, Bath, and Beyond"	James Burrows	NBC	
2002 (55th)	Curb Your Enthusiasm	"The Special Section"	Bryan Gordon	HBO	
2002 (55th)	Curb Your Enthusiasm	"Mary, Joseph, and Larry"	David Steinberg	HBO	
2002 (55th)	Curb Your Enthusiasm	"The Nanny from Hell"	Larry Charles	HBO	
2002 (55th)	Sex and the City	"Plus One is the Loneliest Number"	Michael Patrick King	HBO	
2002 (55th)	Will & Grace	"Marry Me a Little"	James Burrows	NBC	
2003 (56th)	Sex and the City	"Boy, Interrupted"	Tim Van Patten	HBO	
2003 (56th)	8 Simple Rules	"Goodbye"	James Widdoes	ABC	
2003 (56th)	Sex and the City	"Great Sexpectations"	Michael Patrick King	HBO	
2003 (56th)	Sex and the City	"Hop, Skip, and a Week"	Michael Engler	HBO	
2003 (56th)	Will & Grace	"Last Ex to Brooklyn"	James Burrows	NBC	
2004 (57th)	Sex and the City	"An American Girl in Paris: Part Deux"	Tim Van Patten	HBO	
2004 (57th)	Curb Your Enthusiasm	"The 5 Wood"	Bryan Gordon	HBO	
2004 (57th)	Curb Your Enthusiasm	"The Car Pool Lane"	Robert B. Weide	HBO	
2004 (57th)	Desperate Housewives	"Pilot"	Charles McDougall	ABC	
2004 (57th)	Desperate Housewives	"Pretty Little Picture"	Arlene Sanford	ABC	
2005 (58th)	My Name Is Earl	"Pilot"	Marc Buckland	NBC	
2005 (58th)	Curb Your Enthusiasm	"The End"	Larry Charles	HBO	
2005 (58th)	Curb Your Enthusiasm	"Korean Bookie"	Bryan Gordon	HBO	
2005 (58th)	Entourage	"Exodus"	Julian Farino	HBO	
2005 (58th)	Will & Grace	"Alive and Schticking"	James Burrows	NBC	
2006 (59th)	Ugly Betty	"Pilot"	Richard Shepard	ABC	
2006 (59th)	30 Rock	"Pilot"	Adam Bernstein	NBC	
2006 (59th)	Boston Legal	"Breast in Show"	Arlene Sanford	ABC	
2006 (59th)	Entourage	"One Day in the Valley"	Julian Farino	HBO	
2006 (59th)	Grey's Anatomy	"The Name of the Game"	Seith Mann	ABC	
2007 (60th)	Pushing Daisies	"Pie-lette"	Barry Sonnenfeld	ABC	
2007 (60th)	30 Rock	"Rosemary's Baby"	Michael Engler	NBC	
2007 (60th)	30 Rock	"Somebody to Love"	Beth McCarthy-Miller	NBC	
2007 (60th)	Desperate Housewives	"Something's Coming"	David Grossman	ABC	
2007 (60th)	Entourage	"The Resurrection"	David Nutter	HBO	
2008 (61st)	The Office	"Dinner Party"	Paul Feig	NBC	
2008 (61st)	30 Rock	"Do-Over"	Don Scardino	NBC	
2008 (61st)	30 Rock	"Reunion"	Beth McCarthy-Miller	NBC	
2008 (61st)	Entourage	"Tree Trippers"	Julian Farino	HBO	
2008 (61st)	Weeds	"The Three Coolers"	Paris Barclay	Showtime	
2009 (62nd)	Modern Family	"Pilot"	Jason Winer	ABC	
2009 (62nd)	Curb Your Enthusiasm	"Seinfeld"	Jeff Schaffer	HBO	
2009 (62nd)	Curb Your Enthusiasm	"The Table Read"	Larry Charles	HBO	
2009 (62nd)	Glee	"Pilot"	Ryan Murphy	Fox	
2009 (62nd)	Glee	"Wheels"	Paris Barclay	Fox	

=== 2010s ===
Year	Program	Episode	Winners and nominees	Network	Ref.
2010 (63rd)	Modern Family	"Halloween"	Michael Spiller	ABC	
2010 (63rd)	30 Rock	"Live Show"	Beth McCarthy-Miller	NBC	
2010 (63rd)	Entourage	"Lose Yourself"	David Nutter	HBO	
2010 (63rd)	Glee	"The Power of Madonna"	Ryan Murphy	Fox	
2010 (63rd)	Modern Family	"Hawaii"	Steven Levitan	ABC	
2011 (64th)	Curb Your Enthusiasm	"Palestinian Chicken"	Robert B. Weide	HBO	
2011 (64th)	30 Rock	"Double-Edged Sword"	Don Scardino	NBC	
2011 (64th)	Curb Your Enthusiasm	"The Divorce"	David Steinberg	HBO	
2011 (64th)	Modern Family	"After the Fire"	Fred Savage	ABC	
2011 (64th)	Modern Family	"Express Christmas"	Michael Spiller	ABC	
2012 (65th)	Girls	"Pilot"	Lena Dunham	HBO	
2012 (65th)	30 Rock	"Live from Studio 6H"	Beth McCarthy-Miller	NBC	
2012 (65th)	The Big Bang Theory	"The Date Night Variable"	Mark Cendrowski	CBS	
2012 (65th)	Louie	"New Year's Eve"	Louis C.K.	FX	
2012 (65th)	Modern Family	"Election Day"	Bryan Cranston	ABC	
2013 (66th)	30 Rock	"Hogcock!" / "Last Lunch"	Beth McCarthy-Miller	NBC	
2013 (66th)	The Big Bang Theory	"The Hofstadter Insufficiency"	Mark Cendrowski	CBS	
2013 (66th)	The Big Bang Theory	"The Love Spell Potential"	Anthony Rich	CBS	
2013 (66th)	Modern Family	"My Hero"	Gail Mancuso	ABC	
2013 (66th)	Modern Family	"The Old Man & the Tree"	Bryan Cranston	ABC	
2014 (67th)	Transparent	"Best New Girl"	Joey Soloway	Amazon	
2014 (67th)	Louie	"Elevator, Part 6"	Louis C.K.	FX	
2014 (67th)	Modern Family	"Las Vegas"	Gail Mancuso	ABC	
2014 (67th)	Orange Is the New Black	"Thirsty Bird"	Jodie Foster	Netflix	
2014 (67th)	Silicon Valley	"Minimum Viable Product"	Mike Judge	HBO	
2015 (68th)	Veep	"Election Night"	Chris Addison	HBO	
2015 (68th)	Louie	"Sleepover"	Louis C.K.	FX	
2015 (68th)	Modern Family	"White Christmas"	Gail Mancuso	ABC	
2015 (68th)	Silicon Valley	"Binding Arbitration"	Mike Judge	HBO	
2015 (68th)	Transparent	"Kina Hora"	Joey Soloway	Amazon	
2016 (69th)	Veep	"Inauguration"	Becky Martin	HBO	
2016 (69th)	Atlanta	"B.A.N."	Donald Glover	FX	
2016 (69th)	Silicon Valley	"Daily Active Users"	Alec Berg	HBO	
2016 (69th)	Silicon Valley	"Founder Friendly"	Mike Judge	HBO	
2016 (69th)	Veep	"Mother"	Dale Stern	HBO	
2017 (70th)	Veep	"Chicklet"	Beth McCarthy-Miller	HBO	
2017 (70th)	The Marvelous Mrs. Maisel	"Pilot"	Amy Sherman-Palladino	Amazon	
2017 (70th)	Master of None	"Thanksgiving"	Melina Matsoukas	Netflix	
2017 (70th)	Master of None	"The Thief"	Aziz Ansari	Netflix	
2017 (70th)	Silicon Valley	"Server Error"	Mike Judge	HBO	
2018 (71st)	Barry	"Chapter One: Make Your Mark"	Bill Hader	HBO	
2018 (71st)	Atlanta	"FUBU"	Donald Glover	FX	
2018 (71st)	Atlanta	"Teddy Perkins"	Hiro Murai	FX	
2018 (71st)	The Marvelous Mrs. Maisel	"All Alone"	Amy Sherman-Palladino	Amazon	
2018 (71st)	The Marvelous Mrs. Maisel	"We're Going to the Catskills!"	Daniel Palladino	Amazon	
2019 (72nd)	Barry	"ronny/lily"	Bill Hader	HBO	
2019 (72nd)	The Marvelous Mrs. Maisel	"It's Comedy or Cabbage"	Amy Sherman-Palladino	Amazon	
2019 (72nd)	The Marvelous Mrs. Maisel	"It's the Sixties, Man!"	Dan Attias	Amazon	
2019 (72nd)	The Marvelous Mrs. Maisel	"Marvelous Radio"	Daniel Palladino	Amazon	
2019 (72nd)	Veep	"Veep"	David Mandel	HBO	

=== 2020s ===
Year	Program	Episode	Winners and nominees	Network	Ref.
2020 (73rd)	The Flight Attendant	"In Case of Emergency"	Susanna Fogel	HBO Max	
2020 (73rd)	Curb Your Enthusiasm	"The Surprise Party"	Erin O'Malley	HBO	
2020 (73rd)	Curb Your Enthusiasm	"The Spite Store"	Jeff Schaffer	HBO	
2020 (73rd)	Ted Lasso	"Biscuits"	Zach Braff	Apple TV+	
2020 (73rd)	Ted Lasso	"The Hope that Kills You"	MJ Delaney	Apple TV+	
2021 (74th)	Hacks	"There Is No Line"	Lucia Aniello	HBO Max	
2021 (74th)	Ted Lasso	"No Weddings and a Funeral"	MJ Delaney	Apple TV+	
2021 (74th)	Ted Lasso	"Rainbow"	Erica Dunton	Apple TV+	
2021 (74th)	Ted Lasso	"Beard After Hours"	Sam Jones	Apple TV+	
2021 (74th)	The White Lotus	"Mysterious Monkeys"	Mike White	HBO	
2022 (75th)	Barry	"710N"	Bill Hader	HBO	
2022 (75th)	The Bear	"Review"	Christopher Storer	Hulu	
2022 (75th)	The Marvelous Mrs. Maisel	"How Do You Get to Carnegie Hall?"	Amy Sherman-Palladino	Amazon	
2022 (75th)	The White Lotus	"Arrivederci"	Mike White	HBO	
2022 (75th)	Wednesday	"Wednesday's Child is Full of Woe"	Tim Burton	Netflix	
2023 (76th)	The Bear	"Fishes"	Christopher Storer	FX	
2023 (76th)	Barry	"wow"	Bill Hader	HBO	
2023 (76th)	The Bear	"Honeydew"	Ramy Youssef	FX	
2023 (76th)	Ted Lasso	"So Long, Farewell"	Declan Lowney	Apple TV+	
2023 (76th)	Ted Lasso	"La Locker Room Aux Folles"	Erica Dunton	Apple TV+	
2024 (77th)	Hacks	"Bulletproof"	Lucia Aniello	HBO Max	
2024 (77th)	The Bear	"Doors"	Duccio Fabbri	FX	
2024 (77th)	The Bear	"Napkins"	Ayo Edebiri	FX	
2024 (77th)	The Bear	"Tomorrow"	Christopher Storer	FX	
2024 (77th)	Curb Your Enthusiasm	"No Lessons Learned"	Jeff Schaffer	HBO	
2025 (77th)	The Studio	"The Oner"	Seth Rogen and Evan Goldberg	Apple TV	
2025 (77th)	Hacks	"A Slippery Slope"	Lucia Aniello	HBO Max	
2025 (77th)	The Bear	"Worms"	Janicza Bravo	FX	
2025 (77th)	The Bear	"Bears"	Christopher Storer	FX	
2025 (77th)	The White Lotus	"Denials"	Mike White	HBO	

== Programs with multiple wins ==
8 wins

- M*A*S*H (CBS)

3 wins

- All in the Family (CBS)
- Barry (HBO)
- Seinfeld (NBC)
- Veep (HBO)

2 wins

- Cheers (NBC)
- Curb Your Enthusiasm (HBO)
- Frasier (NBC)
- The Golden Girls (NBC)
- Hacks (HBO Max/Max)
- Modern Family (ABC)
- Murphy Brown (CBS)
- Sex and the City (HBO)
- Sports Night (ABC)

== Programs with multiple nominations ==
14 nominations

- Curb Your Enthusiasm (HBO)

13 nominations

- M*A*S*H (CBS)

10 nominations

- Cheers (NBC)
- Modern Family (ABC)
- Sex and the City (HBO)

9 nominations

- 30 Rock (NBC)
- Frasier (NBC)
- Seinfeld (NBC)

8 nominations

- The Bear (FX)

7 nominations

- The Marvelous Mrs. Maisel (Amazon)
- Ted Lasso (Apple TV+)
- Will & Grace (NBC)

5 nominations

- All in the Family (CBS)
- Entourage (HBO)
- The Larry Sanders Show (HBO)
- Mary Tyler Moore (CBS)
- Murphy Brown (CBS)
- Silicon Valley (HBO)
- Veep (HBO)

4 nominations

- Barry (HBO)
- Maude (CBS)

3 nominations

- Atlanta (FX)
- The Big Bang Theory (CBS)
- Desperate Housewives (ABC)
- Glee (Fox)
- The Golden Girls (NBC)
- Hacks (HBO Max)
- Louie (FX)
- Mad About You (NBC)
- Taxi (ABC/NBC)
- The White Lotus (HBO)

2 nominations

- Barney Miller (ABC)
- Malcolm in the Middle (Fox)
- Master of None (Netflix)
- Moonlighting (ABC)
- Soap (ABC)
- Sports Night (ABC)
- Transparent (Amazon)
- The Wonder Years (ABC)

== Individuals with multiple wins ==
4 wins

- James Burrows

3 wins

- Alan Alda (2 consecutive)
- Bill Hader (2 consecutive)

2 wins

- Andy Ackerman (consecutive)
- Lucia Aniello
- Hy Averback (consecutive)
- Paul Bogart (consecutive)
- Beth McCarthy-Miller
- Gene Reynolds (consecutive)
- Jay Sandrich (consecutive)
- Thomas Schlamme (consecutive)
- Tim Van Patten (consecutive)

== Individuals with multiple nominations ==
21 nominations

- James Burrows

8 nominations

- Jay Sandrich

6 nominations

- Todd Holland
- Beth McCarthy-Miller

4 nominations

- Alan Alda
- Andy Ackerman
- Pamela Fryman
- Bill Hader
- Mike Judge
- Noam Pitlik
- Amy Sherman-Palladino
- David Steinberg
- Christopher Storer

3 nominations

- Lucia Aniello
- Paul Bogart
- Larry Charles
- Tom Cherones
- Louis C.K.
- Hal Cooper
- Michael Engler
- Julian Farino
- Bryan Gordon
- Barnet Kellman
- Michael Patrick King
- Gail Mancuso
- Jeff Schaffer
- Mike White

2 nominations

- Hy Averback
- Paris Barclay
- Peter Bonerz
- Mark Cendrowski
- Allen Coulter
- Bryan Cranston
- MJ Delaney
- Charles S. Dubin
- Erica Dunton
- Donald Glover
- Terry Hughes
- Gordon Hunt
- David Lee
- Burt Metcalfe
- Ryan Murphy
- David Nutter
- Daniel Palladino
- Gene Reynolds
- John Rich
- Arlene Sanford
- Don Scardino
- Thomas Schlamme
- Joey Soloway
- Michael Spiller
- Tim Van Patten
- Robert B. Weide

== Total awards by network ==
- NBC – 16
- CBS – 13
- HBO – 11
- ABC – 8
- HBO Max – 3
- Amazon Studios – 1
- Fox – 1
- FX – 1
