= Carol of the Bells (disambiguation) =

"Carol of the Bells" is a Christmas carol.

Carol of the Bells may also refer to:

- Carol of the Bells (film), a 2022 Ukrainian film
- "Carol of the Bells" (Ted Lasso), a 2021 TV episode
- Carol of the Bells, a 2019 film directed by Joey Travolta
- Carol of the Bells, a 2007 EP by Emmy Rossum
