= The Signal (Ted Lasso) =

- Ted Lasso episode
- Episode no.: Season 2 Episode 6
- Directed by: Erica Dunton
- Written by: Brett Goldstein
- Cinematography by: Ryan Kernagham
- Editing by: A.J. Catoline
- Original release date: August 27, 2021
- Running time: 35 minutes

Guest appearances
- Toheeb Jimoh as Sam Obisanya; Cristo Fernández as Dani Rojas; Kola Bokinni as Isaac McAdoo; Harriet Walter as Deborah Welton; Annette Badland as Mae

Episode chronology
← Previous "Rainbow"	Next → "Headspace"

"The Signal" is the sixth episode of the second season of the American sports comedy-drama television series Ted Lasso, based on the character played by Jason Sudeikis in a series of promos for NBC Sports' coverage of England's Premier League. It is the 16th overall episode of the series and was written by main cast member Brett Goldstein and directed by Erica Dunton. It was released on Apple TV+ on August 27, 2021.

The series follows Ted Lasso, an American college football coach, who is unexpectedly recruited to coach a fictional English Premier League soccer team, AFC Richmond, despite having no experience coaching soccer. The team's owner, Rebecca Welton, hires Lasso hoping he will fail as a means of exacting revenge on the team's previous owner, Rupert, her unfaithful ex-husband. The previous season saw Rebecca change her mind on the club's direction and working Ted in saving it, although the club is relegated from the Premier League. In the episode, Richmond prepares to compete for the quarter-finals of the FA Cup. Meanwhile, Rebecca is visited by her mother, who separated from her husband.

The episode received critical acclaim, with critics praising the performances, writing, themes and character development. For her performance in the episode, Harriet Walter was nominated for Outstanding Guest Actress in a Comedy Series at the 74th Primetime Creative Arts Emmy Awards.

== Plot ==
With Roy (Brett Goldstein) joining as a coach, AFC Richmond has now won four games, improving their position. Meanwhile, Rebecca (Hannah Waddingham) has a one-night stand with a man she met on a website, when she is visited by her mother, Deborah (Harriet Walter). Rebecca invites Ted (Jason Sudeikis) to lunch with her and Deborah, which he accepts. At the pub, Deborah announces that she is separating from Rebecca's father, although Rebecca notes that it happens quite often.

Meanwhile, Jamie (Phil Dunster) is angry that Roy refuses to coach him, despite his improved behavior with the club. When questioned by Ted, Roy claims that Jamie has become an average player who will not reach his potential unless he brings out his arrogant and antagonistic side from his first stint at the club - or, as Roy puts it, to "be a prick" - but only when the occasion calls for it. When Jamie asks how will he know when a situation calls for this behaviour, Roy says he'll give Jamie a signal. He refuses to disclose what the signal is but tells Jamie that he'll know it when he sees it.

AFC Richmond now competes with Tottenham Hotspur F.C. to enter the quarter-finals of the FA Cup. As Richmond is struggling, Roy decides it is time for "the signal", and he, Ted, Beard (Brendan Hunt) and Nate (Nick Mohammed) proceed to give Jamie the finger. Understanding the signal, Jamie provokes an opposing player into fouling him and scores the subsequent free kick as the first half finishes. However, Ted has a panic attack, forcing him to leave the game with some minutes left. As Richmond is distracted, the Spurs seize the opportunity to score a goal via a corner kick, tying the score. As Beard and Roy debate what to do, Nate decides to substitute three of the players and be more defensive, which leads to Richmond's victory when Jamie scores another goal on the counter-attack.

Nate is hailed by the media for his role in the victory, earning him respect among the public. Higgins (Jeremy Swift) advises Beard to break up with his girlfriend Jane, as she may not be suitable for him, although Beard still goes out with her. Rebecca tries to find Ted, but he is not in the locker room or the offices. As she returns home, Rebecca finds that her mother left and again has reconciled with her father. While she prepares to meet with the man from the previous night, a message appears from her Bantr match, who is revealed to be Sam. As everyone leaves the stadium, Sharon (Sarah Niles) goes to her office and finds Ted, who asks for an appointment.

== Development ==
=== Production ===
The episode was directed by Erica Dunton and written by main cast member Brett Goldstein. This was Dunton's second directing credit, and Goldstein's second writing credit for the show.

== Critical reviews ==
"The Signal" received critical acclaim. Myles McNutt of The A.V. Club gave the episode an "A-" and wrote, "'The Signal' has lots of great moments sprinkled throughout, but the central juxtaposition between a thrilling victory for AFC Richmond and an A.T.L. for Ted elevates the proceedings, and pushes the show into another gear at the halfway point in the season. And the most effective part of the episode is that although I have some lingering concerns stemming from the choices in last week's episode, I don't really know where things go from here: the team might be on an upward swing, but the show is descending into deeper emotional territory, and unpacking it has the potential to elevate the storytelling further. And sure, it could also mess everything up, but that's how television works, and we'll cross that bridge when we come to it."

Alan Sepinwall of Rolling Stone wrote, "By sprinkling in more conflict — and repeatedly confronting the question of whether Ted's smiling persona is actually doing harm to both himself and the team — 'The Signal' was the season's most satisfying episode yet."

Keith Phipps of Vulture gave the episode a 4 star rating out of 5 and wrote, "I still adore this show and think what it's doing in this second season — experimenting with what can be done with a sitcom without traditional conflicts — has been just as compelling as what it did in the first season." Becca Newton of TV Fanatic gave the episode a 4.5 star rating out of 5 and wrote, "Ted's panic attacks were bound to come up again, and having him suffer one now makes for a nice transition to the second half of the season."

Linda Holmes of NPR wrote, "'The Signal' is a jam-packed episode, plot-wise, moving a bunch of stories forward in important ways. But nothing in it matters as much as Ted and Dr. Sharon." Christopher Orr of The New York Times wrote, "If this week's episode, 'The Signal', seems a bit scattered (and it does), it is in large part because it has returned to the nuts-and-bolts business of moving multiple subplots forward."

=== Awards and accolades ===
For the episode, Harriet Walter was nominated for Primetime Emmy Award for Outstanding Guest Actress in a Comedy Series nomination at the 74th Primetime Creative Arts Emmy Awards. She lost the award to Laurie Metcalf in Hacks.
