= Man City (Ted Lasso) =

- Ted Lasso episode
- Episode no.: Season 2 Episode 8
- Directed by: Matt Lipsey
- Written by: Jamie Lee
- Cinematography by: Vanessa Whyte
- Editing by: A.J. Catoline
- Original release date: September 10, 2021
- Running time: 45 minutes

Guest appearances
- Toheeb Jimoh as Sam Obisanya; Cristo Fernández as Dani Rojas; Kola Bokinni as Isaac McAdoo; Kieran O'Brien as James Tartt; Annette Badland as Mae; Ruth Bradley as Mrs. Bowen; Sofia Barclay as Dr. O'Sullivan

Episode chronology
| ← Previous "Headspace" | Next → "Beard After Hours" |

"Man City" is the eighth episode of the second season of the American sports comedy-drama television series Ted Lasso, based on the character played by Jason Sudeikis in a series of promos for NBC Sports' coverage of England's Premier League. It is the 18th overall episode of the series and was written by co-executive producer Jamie Lee and directed by Matt Lipsey. It was released on Apple TV+ on September 10, 2021.

The series follows Ted Lasso, an American college football coach, who is unexpectedly recruited to coach a fictional English Premier League soccer team, AFC Richmond, despite having no experience coaching soccer/football. The team's owner, Rebecca Welton, hires Lasso hoping he will fail as a means of exacting revenge on the team's previous owner, Rupert, her unfaithful ex-husband. The previous season saw Rebecca change her mind on the club's direction and working Ted in saving it, although the club is relegated from the Premier League. In the episode, AFC Richmond prepares to fend off Manchester City in the FA Cup semi-finals, while Ted helps a recovering Sharon from an incident.

The episode received extremely positive reviews from critics, who praised the performances, character development and emotional tone. However, Sam's and Rebecca's storyline was negatively received.

== Plot ==
While riding her bicycle, Sharon (Sarah Niles) is accidentally hit by a car. She suffers a concussion, and Ted (Jason Sudeikis) goes to the hospital to check on her, leaving Roy (Brett Goldstein), Beard (Brendan Hunt) and Nate (Nick Mohammed) in charge. Roy also has to leave, as he is called to his niece's school.

Sam's father calls to inform him that his actions in opposing Dubai Air and its owner Cerithium Oil caused the company to be expelled from Nigeria and congratulates him, which makes Jamie (Phil Dunster) jealous. Sam also messages his Bantr date, unaware that it is Rebecca (Hannah Waddingham), and asks to meet for dinner, which she accepts.

Pressured by his father for tickets for the FA Cup semi-finals at Wembley Stadium, Jamie asks Higgins (Jeremy Swift) to get him tickets in the least accessible section of the stadium, but Higgins gets his father seats in the VIP section. Meanwhile, Roy is told by Phoebe's teacher that she is emulating his use of swearing. He tells Phoebe to stop doing it, which she agrees to do.

Sharon is discharged from the hospital but is told by the doctor that she cannot leave alone. Ted accompanies her home, finding empty wine and spirit bottles. Later that night, Ted calls Sharon to check on her, and she thanks him for his help. Sam and Rebecca finally meet, surprising each other. Despite Rebecca's initially insisting they should call it off, Sam convinces her to go through with dinner, which they enjoy. When he takes her home, she kisses him, although they both agree that it will not go further than that.

Richmond make their Wembley debut versus Manchester City, Jamie's old club. Before the game starts, Ted admits to the coaching staff that he left their previous game because of a panic attack, which they express support for. Despite their determination, Richmond loses 5–0 while Jamie's father, James (Kieran O'Brien), wearing Jamie's old Manchester City jersey, heckles him from the stands. James comes into the locker room and continues to mock Jamie and the team for their loss. Fed up of James' treatment of him, Jamie punches him in the face, and Beard throws James out. Roy embraces Jamie, who breaks down in tears, while Ted leaves the scene, shaken. He calls Sharon and finally opens up about his past, confessing that his father died by suicide when Ted was 16 years old. As Ted goes back to join the club, Beard decides to leave for the night. After watching Sam's postgame interview, Rebecca texts him. She leaves to meet him, only to find him at her door. They kiss as Rebecca closes the door.

== Development ==
=== Production ===
The episode was directed by Matt Lipsey and written by co-executive producer Jamie Lee. This was Lipsey's second directing credit, and Lee's second writing credit for the show.

== Critical reviews ==
"Man City" received positive reviews from critics. Myles McNutt of The A.V. Club gave the episode a "B" and wrote, "I feel we've reached a point of maturity in the Ted Lasso discourse that I can spend some time detailing how frustrated I am with Sam and Rebecca's storyline in 'Man City' without derailing the great conversations we've been having so far this season. Because while the episode overall does some good work to transition the show into the season’s third act, the resolution of the bantr storyline just didn't work for me on any level."

Alan Sepinwall of Rolling Stone wrote, "Even so, 'Man City' clocks in at 10 minutes longer than the season average — essentially the length of two network sitcom episodes back to back, or that of many modern dramas. But it never feels long, because it earns that relatively epic running time. The installment brings several of this season's arcs to a boil, even as it's a really well-constructed episode of television on its own. All the pieces fit together in a satisfying — if often profoundly sad — way across those 45 minutes, and it advances some longer stories without undermining the experience of this installment. It's fantastic."

Keith Phipps of Vulture gave the episode a 4 star rating out of 5 and wrote, "This loss will have consequences. It's going to take Jamie a long time to recover from a double dose of humiliation, and Beard heads off to do God knows what in the London night. The team's spirit appears to be broken, and though Ted makes it through the night without surrendering to a panic attack, it breaks him down enough that he knows he has to level with Sharon about one source of his troubles: his father's death by suicide." Becca Newton of TV Fanatic gave the episode a perfect 5 star rating out of 5 and wrote, "Ted Lasso isn't a joyous, life-affirming show because it thinks life is nothing but an endless swim in a pool filled with cash and Sour Patch Kids. It's a joyous, life-affirming show because it acknowledges the less rosy sides of life. So even though 'Man City' was the darkest installment of the show to date, it also had some of its warmest, most uplifting moments yet."

Linda Holmes of NPR wrote, "The genuine comedy-drama that unapologetically mixes genuine dramatic elements with silliness, a show like Barry or The Marvelous Mrs. Maisel or Fleabag or GLOW or Insecure, while it isn't entirely new, has found a home in the present streaming landscape that didn't necessarily exist 20 years ago except in rare cases. And that brings us to this week's episode of Ted Lasso." Christopher Orr of The New York Times wrote, "I'm sure there will be a variety of strong opinions about the Rebecca-Sam connection. And I think everyone — myself included! — should wait to see how it proceeds before coming to firm conclusions. But it may be that I exaggerated (ever so slightly?) the degree to which Sam's father raised him to be a gentleman."

=== Awards and accolades ===
TVLine named Phil Dunster as an honorable mention as the "Performer of the Week" for the week of September 11, 2021, for his performance in the episode. The site wrote, "Ted Lasso Season 2 had been, disarmingly so, drama-free when it came to prodigal son Jamie Tartt. But early on this week, when Jamie winced at a text from his Dad, you sensed something was brewing. That dread was confirmed when James and boozy buds showed up for AFC Richmond's semifinal — in opponent Man City's jerseys. What followed was a tense scene between Phil Dunster's Jamie and his pop, who came to the locker room not to just taunt Jamie about losing (badly) to the club he played with for a hot minute, but to dis his current mates as 'amateurs.' Throughout James' harangue, Dunster gave us a stoic, though clearly not unmoved, Jamie. You could hear a fuse hissing. When Jamie eventually clocked his father, watch again and you’ll see a mix of 'Did I just punch my Dad?' sadness and 'Damn straight I did!' resolve. A teary embrace with Roy punctuated Dunster's most nuanced work yet."
