= The Hope That Kills You (Ted Lasso) =

- Ted Lasso episode
- Episode no.: Season 1 Episode 10
- Directed by: MJ Delaney
- Story by: Joe Kelly; Jason Sudeikis
- Teleplay by: Brendan Hunt
- Cinematography by: John Sorapure
- Editing by: A.J. Catoline
- Original release date: October 2, 2020
- Running time: 34 minutes

Guest appearances
- Anthony Head as Rupert Mannion; Toheeb Jimoh as Sam Obisanya; Annette Badland as Mae; James Lance as Trent Crimm

Episode chronology
← Previous "All Apologies"	Next → "Goodbye Earl"

"The Hope That Kills You" is the tenth episode and first-season finale of the American sports comedy-drama television series Ted Lasso, based on the character played by Jason Sudeikis in a series of promos for NBC Sports' coverage of England's Premier League. The episode was written by main cast member Brendan Hunt from a story by Joe Kelly and main cast member Jason Sudeikis, and directed by MJ Delaney. It was released on Apple TV+ on October 2, 2020.

The series follows Ted Lasso, an American college football coach, who is unexpectedly recruited to coach a fictional English Premier League soccer team, A.F.C. Richmond, despite having no experience coaching soccer. The team's owner, Rebecca Welton, hires Lasso hoping he will fail as a means of exacting revenge on the team's previous owner, Rupert, her unfaithful ex-husband. In the episode, Richmond prepares for a decisive match against Manchester City F.C., which will determinate their relegation.

The episode received extremely positive reviews from critics, who praised the performances, writing, directing and closure. For the episode, MJ Delaney was nominated for Outstanding Directing for a Comedy Series at the 73rd Primetime Emmy Awards.

== Plot ==
Nate (Nick Mohammed) arrives to work, only to find that another man has been hired as the new kit man. Ted (Jason Sudeikis) and Rebecca (Hannah Waddingham) reveal to Nate that he has been promoted to assistant coach for their next game against Manchester City F.C. To motivate the team, Nate shows them a video of Jamie (Phil Dunster) trash-talking the club. If the club loses the game, it will result in their relegation to the second-tier Championship League. Inspired by Rebecca's advice to create chaos on the field, Ted and the club come up with trick plays to confuse Manchester City. Jamie decides to visit Keeley (Juno Temple) after seeing a video of Ted's opinion of him, and discovers that she is now in a relationship with Roy.

In the final match of the season, Richmond and Manchester City end the first half in a 0–0 tie. For the second half, Ted decides to put Roy back on the field. Manchester City manages to score a goal through a penalty kick. When Jamie tries to score, Roy prevents him from doing so, although he winds up with a knee injury. The crowd cheers for Roy while he heads back to the locker room. As commentators wonder if this was his last game, Roy is joined by Keeley in the locker room. At the same time, news break that Crystal Palace F.C. won their game with a 6–0 score, meaning that Richmond only needs to tie to avoid relegation.

With three minutes in added time, the club presses for the tie. The team decides to use the "Lasso special" trick play, which has the players taking gridiron football positions, confusing the crowd and Manchester City. With the confusion, Richmond manages to send a pass to Dani (Cristo Fernández), who scores a goal, achieving the tie. However, in the final seconds, Jamie makes an extra pass to a teammate who scores and wins the game for Manchester City, effectively relegating Richmond. When Ted goes to congratulate Jamie, he sees his father berating him for passing the ball and not scoring the goal himself.

Ted then talks with his team, attempting to cheer everyone up with some advice he offered Sam earlier in the season and saying that together they will get through it. Just as Jamie is about to board the bus back to Manchester, Beard (Brendan Hunt) delivers a note from Ted, who congratulates him for the extra pass and gives him a toy soldier to look after him. Ted visits Rebecca to resign, but she declines. They both intend to work hard for the next season to win promotion and then to win the Premier League.

== Development ==
=== Production ===
The character of Ted Lasso first appeared in 2013 as part of NBC Sports promoting their coverage of the Premier League, portrayed by Jason Sudeikis. In October 2019, Apple TV+ gave a series order to a series focused on the character, with Sudeikis reprising his role and co-writing the episode with executive producer Bill Lawrence. Sudeikis and collaborators Brendan Hunt and Joe Kelly started working on a project around 2015, which evolved further when Lawrence joined the series. The episode was directed by MJ Delaney and written by main cast member Brendan Hunt from a story by Joe Kelly and main cast member Jason Sudeikis. This was Delaney's second directing credit, Hunt's fourth writing credit, Kelly's fourth writing credit, and Sudeikis' fourth writing credit for the show.

=== Casting ===
The series announcement confirmed that Jason Sudeikis would reprise his role as the main character. Other actors who are credited as series regulars include Hannah Waddingham, Jeremy Swift, Phil Dunster, Brett Goldstein, Brendan Hunt, Nick Mohammed, and Juno Temple.

== Critical reviews ==
"The Hope That Kills You" received extremely positive reviews from critics. Gissane Sophia of Marvelous Geeks Media wrote, "'The Hope That Kills You' is one of the most hopeful episodes of television I've watched in years, and yet so few things about it are actually happy. It's an episode full of some deeply sad moments, but the community established within this show is the very reason why the aftermath is somehow still so joyous."

Mads Lennon of FanSided wrote, "Episode 10 begins with a promotion: Nate is the newest assistant coach! His days of cleaning cleats are over. Other changes in the team’s power dynamics include Roy trying to hand in his Captain's band. Ted doesn't want to accept it, but if Roy is dead set on letting go, he'll have to at least choose his successor." Daniel Hart of Ready Steady Cut gave the episode a 3.5 star rating out of 5 wrote, "No-one will grumble at a second season; the finale of Ted Lasso season 1 signs off the series in style and emotion as the football club learns their fate."

=== Awards and accolades ===
MJ Delaney was nominated for Outstanding Directing for a Comedy Series at the 73rd Primetime Emmy Awards, losing to Hacks for the episode "There Is No Line". She was also nominated for Directorial Achievement in a Comedy Series at the 73rd Directors Guild of America Awards, losing to The Flight Attendant for the episode "In Case of Emergency".
