= 73rd Directors Guild of America Awards =

- Date: April 10, 2021
- Location: Virtual
- Country: United States
- Presented by: Directors Guild of America

Highlights
- Best Director Feature Film: Nomadland – Chloé Zhao
- Best Director Documentary: The Truffle Hunters – Michael Dweck and Gregory Kershaw
- Best Director First-Time Feature Film: Sound of Metal – Darius Marder
- Website: https://www.dga.org/Awards/Annual.aspx

The 73rd Directors Guild of America Awards, honoring the outstanding directorial achievement in feature films, documentary, television and commercials of 2020, were presented virtually on April 10, 2021. The nominations for the television and documentary categories were announced on March 8, 2021, while the nominations for the feature film categories were announced on March 9, 2021.

== Winners and nominees ==
=== Film ===
Feature Film

Chloé Zhao – Nomadland

- Lee Isaac Chung – Minari
- Emerald Fennell – Promising Young Woman
- David Fincher – Mank
- Aaron Sorkin – The Trial of the Chicago 7
Documentaries

Michael Dweck and Gregory Kershaw – The Truffle Hunters

- Pippa Ehrlich and James Reed – My Octopus Teacher
- David France – Welcome to Chechnya
- Amanda McBaine and Jesse Moss – Boys State
- Benjamin Ree – The Painter and the Thief
First-Time Feature Film

Darius Marder – Sound of Metal

- Radha Blank – The 40-Year-Old Version
- Fernando Frías de la Parra – I'm No Longer Here
- Regina King – One Night in Miami...
- Florian Zeller – The Father

=== Television ===
Drama Series

Lesli Linka Glatter – Homeland for "Prisoners of War"

- Jason Bateman – Ozark for "Wartime"
- Jon Favreau – The Mandalorian for "Chapter 9: The Marshal"
- Vince Gilligan – Better Call Saul for "Bagman"
- Julie Anne Robinson – Bridgerton for "Diamond of the First Water"
Comedy Series

Susanna Fogel – The Flight Attendant for "In Case of Emergency"

- Zach Braff – Ted Lasso for "Biscuits"
- MJ Delaney – Ted Lasso for "The Hope That Kills You"
- Erin O'Malley – Curb Your Enthusiasm for "The Surprise Party"
- Jeff Schaffer – Curb Your Enthusiasm for "The Spite Store"
Movies for Television and Limited Series

Scott Frank – The Queen's Gambit

- Susanne Bier – The Undoing
- Thomas Kail – Hamilton
- Matt Shakman – WandaVision
- Lynn Shelton – Little Fires Everywhere for "Find a Way"
Variety/Talk/News/Sports – Regularly Scheduled Programming

Don Roy King – Saturday Night Live for "Dave Chappelle/Foo Fighters"

- Paul G. Casey – Real Time with Bill Maher for "#1835"
- Jim Hoskinson – The Late Show with Stephen Colbert for "#1025 Live Show Following Capitol Insurrection"
- David Paul Meyer – The Daily Show with Trevor Noah for "President Obama: Inspiring Future Leaders & 'A Promised Land'"
- Christopher Werner – Last Week Tonight with John Oliver for "Trump & Election Results"
Variety/Talk/News/Sports – Specials

Thomas Schlamme – A West Wing Special to Benefit When We All Vote

- Stacey Angeles – The Daily Show with Trevor Noah Presents "Remembering RBG: A Nation Ugly Cried with Desi Lydic"
- Marielle Heller – What the Constitution Means to Me
- Jim Hoskinson – The Late Show with Stephen Colbert for "Stephen Colbert’s Election Night 2020: Democracy's Last Stand: Building Back America Great Again Better 2020"
- Spike Lee – David Byrne's American Utopia
Reality Programs

Joseph Guidry – Full Bloom for "Petal to the Metal"

- David Charles – Eco Challenge for "3, 2, 1...Go!"
- Jon Favreau – The Chef Show for "Tartine"
- Ken Fuchs – Shark Tank for "1211"
- Rich Kim – Lego Masters for "Mega City Block"
Children's Programs

Amy Schatz – We Are the Dream: The Kids of the Oakland MLK Oratorical Fest

- Kabir Akhtar – High School Musical: The Musical: The Series for "Opening Night"
- Larissa Bills – On Pointe for "Showtime!"
- Dean Israelite – The Astronauts for "Countdown"
- Richie Keen – The Healing Powers of Dude for "Second Step: Homeroom"

=== Commercials ===
Commercials

Melina Matsoukas – Beats by Dre's "You Love Me"

- Steve Ayson – Nike's "The Great Chase"
- Nisha Ganatra – Bodyform/Libresse's "#wombstories"
- Niclas Larsson – VW Touareg's "See the Unseen," Volvo XC60's "The Parents"
- Taika Waititi – Coca-Cola's "The Letter"

=== Frank Capra Achievement Award ===
- Brian E. Frankish

=== Franklin J. Schaffner Achievement Award ===
- Joyce Thomas

=== Robert B. Aldrich Service Award ===
- Betty Thomas

=== Honorary Life Member ===
- Paris Barclay
