= Do the Right-est Thing =

- Ted Lasso episode
- Episode no.: Season 2 Episode 3
- Directed by: Ezra Edelman
- Written by: Ashley Nicole Black
- Cinematography by: David Rom
- Editing by: Melissa McCoy; Francesca Castro
- Original release date: August 6, 2021
- Running time: 36 minutes

Guest appearances
- Toheeb Jimoh as Sam Obisanya; Cristo Fernández as Dani Rojas; Kola Bokinni as Isaac McAdoo; Ellie Taylor as Flo "Sassy" Collins; James Lance as Trent Crimm

Episode chronology
← Previous "Lavender"	Next → "Carol of the Bells"

"Do the Right-est Thing" is the third episode of the second season of the American sports comedy-drama television series Ted Lasso, based on the character played by Jason Sudeikis in a series of promos for NBC Sports' coverage of England's Premier League. It is the 13th overall episode of the series and was written by Ashley Nicole Black and directed by Ezra Edelman. It was released on Apple TV+ on August 6, 2021.

The series follows Ted Lasso, an American college football coach, who is unexpectedly recruited to coach a fictional English Premier League soccer team, AFC Richmond, despite having no experience coaching soccer. The team's owner, Rebecca Welton, hires Lasso hoping he will fail as a means of exacting revenge on the team's previous owner, Rupert, her unfaithful ex-husband. The previous season saw Rebecca change her mind on the club's direction and working Ted in saving it, although the club is relegated from the Premier League. In the episode, Sam decides to take a stand when he realizes the team's sponsorship is owned by an oil company that is polluting his country.

The episode received extremely positive reviews from critics, who praised the Sam's character development, performances, themes and writing. For his performance in the episode, Toheeb Jimoh was nominated for Outstanding Supporting Actor in a Comedy Series at the 74th Primetime Emmy Awards.

== Plot ==
AFC Richmond is preparing for a match against Coventry City F.C., hoping to end their streak of draws. The press is also curious whether the return of Jamie (Phil Dunster) to the club will cause any friction among the players, with Sam already expressing his disapproval. Jamie tries to apologize for all his bad behavior with the club, but the club does not accept it.

While texting his father, Sam is informed that the club's sponsor, Dubai Air, is owned by Cerithium Oil, a company responsible for an oil spill in Niger Delta, with his father expressing disappointment that he is going to appear in a Dubai Air ad. Meanwhile, Sassy (Ellie Taylor) brings her daughter Nora (Kiki May) to the office to spend time with Rebecca (Hannah Waddingham), her godmother, while she attends a conference. Rebecca tries to entertain her with childish activities, which Nora has outgrown. They run into Roy (Brett Goldstein) and his niece Phoebe, and the girls spend time together. Roy advises Rebecca that kids want to feel part of the adults' lives, leading her to let Nora spend time with her at the office.

Seeing how the team's hostility to Jamie impedes progress in the field, Ted (Jason Sudeikis) decides to use his persona "Led Tasso", an angry and strict version of himself, to get the club to unite against him instead. Sam decides to withdraw from Dubai Air's ad campaign, a decision that Rebecca supports. However, when Rebecca contacts the Cerithium CEO, Richard Cole (Bill Paterson, uncredited), he tells her to fire Sam for his decision. After consulting with Nora, she informs the company that she won't do it, which appears to be accepted by Cole.

Before their game, Sam decides to cover his uniform's Dubai Air logo with black tape in protest. His reason motivates the rest of the players in the team, including Jamie, to cover their logos as well. This infuriates Cole but wins the public's approval. The game ends in Richmond's first loss of the season. At the post-game press conference, Ted allows Sam to speak and express his disapproval of the company and the Nigerian government's handling of the incident. Sam goes back to the locker room, where the team celebrates ending their streak of draws. Jamie toasts Sam for his courage, and Sam finally accepts Jamie as his teammate.

== Development ==
=== Production ===
The episode was directed by Ezra Edelman and written by Ashley Nicole Black. This was Edelman's first directing credit, and Black's first writing credit for the show.

== Critical reviews ==
"Do the Right-est Thing" received extremely positive reviews from critics. Myles McNutt of The A.V. Club gave the episode an "A–" and wrote, "By introducing more conflict, 'Do The Right-est Thing' is the most substantive episode of the season thus far, in part because newly introduced elements like Dr. Fieldstone and Jamie's re-arrival naturally fit their way into the story. Ted Lasso has a great way of threading stories through episodes: Rebecca running into Roy gets us an update on her dating life which Keeley's promotion of 'bantr' reinforces, while Jamie's attempt to talk to Keeley brings him into Dr. Fieldstone's office as though it's just part of the workplace."

Alan Sepinwall of Rolling Stone wrote, "'Do the Right-est thing' is simultaneously Ted Lasso at its most heartwarming and Ted Lasso at its silliest. It's an episode in which the team has several opportunities to bond through a common, noble cause, and also one where Ted unleashes his ridiculous alter ego, Led Tasso, before trying to explain Chuck E. Cheese to Dr. Sharon. Like Ted with his other personalities, it contains multitudes."

Keith Phipps of Vulture gave the episode a 4 star rating out of 5 and wrote, "You might have thought that, at this point, Ted Lasso had introduced all of the second season’s major characters. But apparently not. 'Do the Right-est Thing' sees the arrival of 'Led Tasso', Ted's evil alter ego. Led's everything Ted is not: callous, demanding, insulting, and unreasonable. He's also a persona Ted turns to only as a last resort." Becca Newton of TV Fanatic gave the episode a 4.2 star rating out of 5 and wrote, "On 'Do the Right-est Thing', the show continues to improve from Ted Lasso Season 1. For a show about a football team, Ted Lasso Season 1 did not pay much attention to the players not named Roy or Jamie. Ted Lasso Season 2 was quick to make changes."

Linda Holmes of NPR wrote, "In a great episode touching on athletes and activism, Sam Obisanya stands up (and Jamie Tartt stands with him) as A.F.C. Richmond continues its battle to end the streak of ties. Meanwhile, Sassy's daughter, Nora, visits Rebecca and inspires her to be her best and bravest self." Christopher Orr of The New York Times wrote, "As I noted early on, the first go-round felt a little more improvisational, a little more like a high-risk, seat-of-the pants experiment. This season already feels more sitcom-polished, carefully constructing 'themes' and 'narratives' rather than simply bouncing a bunch of fascinating characters off one another and seeing what happens."
