= Beard After Hours =

- Ted Lasso episode
- Episode no.: Season 2 Episode 9
- Directed by: Sam Jones
- Written by: Brett Goldstein; Joe Kelly
- Cinematography by: Vanessa Whyte
- Editing by: Melissa McCoy
- Original release date: September 17, 2021
- Running time: 43 minutes

Guest appearances
- Annette Badland as Mae; Kieran O'Brien as James Tartt; Toheeb Jimoh as Sam Obisanya; Cristo Fernández as Dani Rojas; Kola Bokinni as Isaac McAdoo; Charlotte Spencer as Mary (Red Dress)

Episode chronology
← Previous "Man City"	Next → "No Weddings and a Funeral"

"Beard After Hours" is the ninth episode of the second season of the American sports comedy-drama television series Ted Lasso, based on the character played by Jason Sudeikis in a series of promos for NBC Sports' coverage of England's Premier League. It is the 19th overall episode of the series and was written by main cast member Brett Goldstein and executive producer Joe Kelly, and directed by Sam Jones. It was released on Apple TV+ on September 17, 2021.

The series follows Ted Lasso, an American college football coach, who is unexpectedly recruited to coach a fictional English Premier League soccer team, AFC Richmond, despite having no experience coaching soccer. The team's owner, Rebecca Welton, hires Lasso hoping he will fail as a means of exacting revenge on the team's previous owner, Rupert, her unfaithful ex-husband. The previous season saw Rebecca change her mind on the club's direction and working Ted in saving it, although the club is relegated from the Premier League. In the episode, after Richmond's loss, Beard goes back home, deciding to have a night out, which quickly goes out of control.

The episode received polarized reviews from critics; some praised the episode's ambition and compared it to After Hours, others found it self-indulgent while criticizing the runtime and lack of progress in the main storylines.

== Plot ==
After Richmond's loss against Manchester City in the FA Cup, Beard (Brendan Hunt) tells Ted (Jason Sudeikis) he will make his own way home instead of riding together with the team. Ted reminds him to bring coffee in the morning. Arriving at the Wembley Park tube station, he boards a train and arrives at his apartment. He turns on the TV, pops a beer and gets criticized by the soccer commentators Thierry Henry and Gary Lineker.

Distracted by the loss, he decides to go to the pub, where Mae (Annette Badland) criticizes the game planning. He is joined by avid Richmond supporters Baz (Adam Colborne), Jeremy (Bronson Webb) and Paul (Kevin Garry), who take an interest in his conversation. When the pub closes, Beard refuses to go back to his apartment and the four trick their way into (without the much needed membership card) the exclusive, private basement club Bones & Honey. As Baz, Jeremy and Paul have fun in the club, Beard is tormented by imagining Thierry Henry and Gary Lineker mocking him on a pundit show. He stands up abruptly and rips his pants on a nail sticking out from a table. Beard is thrown out from the club when it is discovered that he has no membership card. Outside, he meets Mary, a woman from the club who offers to fix his pants.

Mary takes him to her apartment and gives him a garish, sequin-studded pair of pants to wear while she repairs his. Her boyfriend Darren arrives, furious that she allowed Beard to enter. Beard is forced to escape to the roof without his original pants and jumps from the building into a dumpster. He then jumps onto a double-decker bus, from which he is thrown off when he has no money. After being denied access to a phone in a hotel, he keeps walking into the night. He approaches some strangers for help, only to find that it is James Tartt (Kieran O'Brien) and his friends, who beat him. Their beating is cut short when Darren arrives, scaring them off. Darren tells Beard that he was looking for him to return his phone and wallet. Checking his phone, Beard finds that his girlfriend Jane (Phoebe Walsh) left many angry messages. Just as he is about to contact her his phone's battery dies. Walking the streets, he is found by Baz, Jeremy and Paul, who rented a limo with money they earned playing pool at the club. They take him home, and Beard gives them information about a secret entrance to the club's stadium. After they drive off, Beard's apartment key (which he had repeatedly dropped throughout the episode) breaks in the lock, just as it starts raining. He runs the streets and passes a pink neon cross, (the same that he noticed in one of Jane’s messages just before his phone died). Beard enters the church and prays to God for Jane's forgiveness. Meanwhile, using the secret entrance, Baz, Jeremy and Paul are allowed into the Richmond stadium, where they happily play in the field.

Back at the church, Beard hears noises from a door. Descending into the basement, he finds a very original nightclub party taking place. He joins the crowd on the dance floor and then spots Jane, who hands him a Hula hoop, which he effortlessly spins as he dances. Reconciling, Beard and Jane spend the night dancing in the nightclub. The next day, Beard arrives late at the Richmond office, bringing coffee for Ted, Roy (Brett Goldstein) and Nate (Nick Mohammed), and does not mention anything that happened during the night. While they review the game footage, a sleep-deprived Beard takes a nap, still wearing the spangled pants.

== Development ==
=== Production ===
The episode was directed by Sam Jones and written by main cast member Brett Goldstein and executive producer Joe Kelly. This was Jones' first directing credit, Goldstein's third writing credit, and Kelly's sixth writing credit for the show.

=== Writing ===
This episode, like "Carol of the Bells", was not originally planned for the season. Originally, the season was to consist of 10 episodes, until Apple TV+ expanded it by ordering two more episodes. As the writers had already broken down the season's structure, they opted to add stand-alone episodes. Writer Joe Kelly said that the episode's placement was done "when shit goes down and is about to go down." The writers settled on an episode focused on Beard, with writer Brett Goldstein explaining, "We approached it with the device of 'What would an episode of Ted Lasso be like if it was told from Coach Beard's point of view?' It's why the theme tune and the look, tone and style of it [are different]. It's a whole different vibe. Much darker and stranger. Because Beard's brain isn't as sunny as Ted's."

The writers used After Hours as a starter point for the episode, as it would involve Beard going on a crazy night out and going to work the following morning. The writers didn't intend to reveal much from Beard, with actor Brendan Hunt explaining, "We just showed what we think is a not-atypical night out for him, which is why he just rolled with it." He further added, "The idea was to really run Beard through the mud, but then at the end give him the release of this. It's not necessarily a happy ending, but certainly an opportunity to shake it all off."

== Critical reviews ==
"Beard After Hours" received mixed reviews from critics. Myles McNutt of The A.V. Club gave the episode a "C+" and wrote, "I found 'Beard After Hours' to be almost shockingly dull. Some of this has to do with specific creative choices made within the episode. For one, it's at least ten minutes too long: the idea that we needed as much time to explore Beard's night out as we did to tell the stories in last week's episode is absurd, and I don't really understand how this wasn't trimmed down either in the original script stage or in editing. The pacing is glacial, and there are scenes that are entirely irrelevant to even the minimal plot details supporting this meandering narrative. I realize that the spiraling of the story is meant to be like he's trapped in a never-ending cliche of movie tropes, but the episode lacks the forward momentum to make that feel thrilling instead of a bit of a slog."

Alan Sepinwall of Rolling Stone wrote, "Episodes that deviate from a series' normal POV are often my favorites, as much for how they inform my viewing of later episodes with that character as for the temporary change of pace. 'Beard After Hours' is an entertaining example of that, but one that feels a bit thinner than it could, especially given where it landed within Season Two as a whole. I certainly hope this won't be the last POV shift Ted Lasso tries, but hopefully in the future Apple gives the creative team lots of advance warning about how many episodes they'll be making in a given season, so they can plan accordingly."

Keith Phipps of Vulture gave the episode a 4 star rating out of 5 and wrote, "The big question: Does Beard's story line advance? It's never clear whether or not Jane is good for him. She's clearly not good for him in the traditional sense. All of Higgins's objections ring true by those standards. But Beard also seems a bit lost without her. Is 'Beard After Hours' the story of a welcome reunion, or does its round-and-round, shaggy-dog-story construction reflect the cyclical state of their relationship? The episode doesn't provide an answer if there is one, but it makes it fun to ponder the question." Becca Newton of TV Fanatic gave the episode a perfect 5 star rating out of 5 and wrote, "Before Ted Lasso Season 2 aired, I had a wish list. One of those wishes was for the show to get more experimental - do an installment completely unlike any before. 'Beard After Hours' granted this wish in the best way possible!"

Linda Holmes of NPR wrote, "Like the Christmas episode, it doesn't advance any of the plots that were bubbling at the end of 'Man City'. And yes, that interrupts the narrative momentum that's been building. But the flip side is that it's a chance to play around with tone (if Christmas was sweeter than most Ted episodes, 'Beard After Hours' is more experimental, magical, dreamlike) and to see characters step out of their usual narrative functions. That would probably never have happened absent this scheduling quirk." Christopher Orr of The New York Times wrote, "'Beard After Hours,' by contrast, is frankly bizarre. I love Coach Beard as much as anyone. But his appeal has always been that he is somewhat at the margins, a sardonic observer whose lines tend to be brief but beautifully written and exquisitely underdelivered. An entire episode focused on him, with virtually no participation by the rest of the principal cast is, simply put, a different TV show. Not a bad one, but not remotely the one we have come to expect after 18 episodes."

=== Awards and accolades ===
TVLine named Brendan Hunt as the "Performer of the Week" for the week of September 18, 2021, for his performance in the episode. The site wrote, "Rare are the occasions when we know what Coach Beard is thinking. Even rarer are the occasions when we know what Coach Beard is doing. But Ted Lasso's right-hand man took center stage this week — quite literally at one point, when Beard stumbled upon an underground rave — and Hunt maneuvered an extremely delicate dance with the utmost precision."
