= MJ Delaney =

British director

- Education: Oxford University
- Occupation: Director
- Years active: 2010–present

MJ Delaney is a British director. She is known for her work on Ted Lasso, for which she won a Primetime Emmy Award in 2022.

== Career ==
Delaney was born in London and graduated from Oxford University in 2007. She found early success in 2010 by making a parody of the music video for "Empire State of Mind", with the song rewritten to praise the Welsh town of Newport. The video's viral popularity led to her work directing well-received ads for organizations such as Aldi Süd and Plan International. She also directed an episode of Coming Up. Her feature-film debut, Powder Room, was released in 2013.

Delaney worked with Sharon Horgan and Morgana Robinson on the short programme Morgana Robinson's Summer, which won a BAFTA Award in 2018. She later directed the final two episodes of the first season of Ted Lasso, receiving an Emmy nomination for "The Hope That Kills You". Delaney returned for Ted Lasso's second season and won an Emmy for directing the episode "No Weddings and a Funeral". Delaney was part of the directing team of the Disney+ show Renegade Nell, which premiered on 29 March 2024 on the streaming service.

== Awards and nominations ==
Award	Year	Category	Nominated work	Result	Ref.
Directors Guild of America Awards	2021	Outstanding Directorial Achievement in Comedy Series	Ted Lasso (for "The Hope That Kills You")	Nominated	
Directors Guild of America Awards	2022	Outstanding Directorial Achievement in Comedy Series	Ted Lasso (for "No Weddings and a Funeral")	Nominated	
Hollywood Critics Association TV Awards	2022	Best Directing in a Streaming Series, Comedy	Ted Lasso (for "No Weddings and a Funeral")	Nominated	
Primetime Emmy Awards	2021	Outstanding Directing for a Comedy Series	Ted Lasso (for "The Hope That Kills You")	Nominated	
Primetime Emmy Awards	2022	Outstanding Directing for a Comedy Series	Ted Lasso (for "No Weddings and a Funeral")	Won	
