= Erica Dunton =

British director and screenwriter

- Education: Durham University; National Film and Television School
- Occupations: Director; screenwriter; producer
- Website: ericadunton.com

Erica Dunton is a British director and screenwriter. Her television directing credits include Ted Lasso (2021–2023), The Summer I Turned Pretty (2022), Outer Banks (2024), and You (2025). She has been nominated for two Directors Guild of America Awards.

== Biography ==
Dunton's father, Joe Dunton, was a cinematographer who won the BAFTA Outstanding British Contribution to Cinema Award in 2010. She has two brothers, Lester and Richard. She earned a law degree from Durham University and later studied at the National Film and Television School. Early in her filmmaking career, she also tutored Eve Hewson, whom she cast in her film The 27 Club.

== Filmography ==
=== Film ===
Year	Title	Director	Writer	Producer	Ref.
2005	Lost and Found	Yes	Yes	Yes	
2005	RedMeansGo	Yes	Yes	Yes	
2006	Find Love	Yes	Yes	Yes	
2008	The 27 Club	Yes	Yes	Yes	
2011	to.get.her	Yes	Yes	Yes	
2014	Plastic Jesus	Yes	No	No	
2018	Abigail Falls	Yes	Yes	Yes	
TBA	Pretty Ugly	Yes	Yes	Yes	

=== Television ===
Year	Title	Notes	Ref.
2009	One Tree Hill	Episode: "A Kiss to Build a Dream On"	
2017–2018	The Royals	2 episodes	
2019	Bluff City Law	Episode: "Ave Maria"	
2019	Dolly Parton's Heartstrings	Episode: "Down From Dover"	
2019–2021	Good Trouble	2 episodes	
2020	The Bold Type	2 episodes	
2020	The Baker and the Beauty	Episode: "I Think She's Coming Out"	
2020	Holly & Ivy	Television film	
2021	The Republic of Sarah	2 episodes	
2021–2026	Ted Lasso	6 episodes	
2022	The Summer I Turned Pretty	3 episodes	
2022	Vampire Academy	2 episodes	
2022–2023	Julia	2 episodes	
2024	The Girls on the Bus	2 episodes	
2024	Bad Monkey	2 episodes	
2024	Outer Banks	2 episodes	
2025	You	Episode: "#JoeGoldberg"	
2025-2027	We Were Liars	2 episodes	
2025	The Waterfront	2 episodes	
2026	Off Campus	2 episodes	
2026	Brilliant Minds	Episode: "Doctor, Interrupted"	
2026	Dexter: Resurrection	4 episodes	

== Awards and nominations ==
Award	Year	Category	Nominated work	Result	Ref.
Directors Guild of America Awards	2022	Outstanding Directing – Comedy Series	Ted Lasso (for "Rainbow")	Nominated	
Directors Guild of America Awards	2024	Outstanding Directing – Comedy Series	Ted Lasso (for "La Locker Room Aux Folles")	Nominated	
RiverRun International Film Festival	2011	Altered States: New Directions in American Cinema	to.get.her	Won	
Sundance Film Festival	2011	Best of NEXT Audience Award	to.get.her	Won	
