= Rainbow (Ted Lasso) =

- Ted Lasso episode
- Episode no.: Season 2 Episode 5
- Directed by: Erica Dunton
- Written by: Bill Wrubel
- Cinematography by: Ryan Kernagham
- Editing by: Melissa McCoy
- Original release date: August 20, 2021
- Running time: 38 minutes

Guest appearances
- Toheeb Jimoh as Sam Obisanya; Cristo Fernández as Dani Rojas; Kola Bokinni as Isaac McAdoo

Episode chronology
← Previous "Carol of the Bells"	Next → "The Signal"

"Rainbow" is the fifth episode of the second season of the American sports comedy-drama television series Ted Lasso, based on the character played by Jason Sudeikis in a series of promos for NBC Sports' coverage of England's Premier League. It is the 15th overall episode of the series and was written by executive producer Bill Wrubel and directed by Erica Dunton. It was released on Apple TV+ on August 20, 2021.

The series follows Ted Lasso, an American college football coach, who is unexpectedly recruited to coach a fictional English Premier League soccer team, AFC Richmond, despite having no experience coaching soccer. The team's owner, Rebecca Welton, hires Lasso hoping he will fail as a means of exacting revenge on the team's previous owner, Rupert, her unfaithful ex-husband. The previous season saw Rebecca change her mind on the club's direction and working with Ted to save it, although the club is relegated from the Premier League. In the episode, Isaac's role as leader of the club is questioned, prompting Ted to ask Roy for help. Meanwhile, Nate asks Keeley and Rebecca for help in getting a specific reservation for a restaurant.

The episode received positive reviews, with critics praising the episode's ending and performances. However, some criticized the episode's failure in properly exploring previous storylines. For his performance in the episode, Brett Goldstein won Outstanding Supporting Actor in a Comedy Series at the 74th Primetime Emmy Awards.

== Plot ==
Nate (Nick Mohammed) arrives at his parents' favorite restaurant to reserve a window table for their anniversary, but the hostess tells him they can't reserve that table and instead offers one in the back. He tries to use his connection to Roy (Brett Goldstein) to get it, but fails.

AFC Richmond loses another game, with the club blaming captain Isaac (Kola Bokinni) for his poor leadership. This prompts Ted (Jason Sudeikis) to ask Roy for help. Roy brings Ted and Isaac to a soccer field near his childhood home. He reminds Isaac that football is a game and he must have fun while playing, so Isaac joins in with the local players. Meanwhile, Keeley (Juno Temple) is promoting a dating app called Bantr, which is the club's new sponsor. Rebecca (Hannah Waddingham) uses the app and makes an intriguing contact.

Rebecca and Keeley also advise Nate on his desire for the restaurant window table, encouraging him to be more assertive in making his request. When Nate arrives at the restaurant with his parents, he is once again sent to the table in the back. After talking with himself in the restroom mirror, he confidently tells the hostess that he wants the window table. She gives him the table but declines his request for her number.

Back on the pitch, Isaac's enthusiasm and enjoyment have returned. Ted offers Roy a chance to return to Richmond as a coach, but Roy feels his football days are behind him. The next day, AFC Richmond prepares for another game, with Isaac now believing in himself and his team. While talking on Soccer Saturday, Roy laments how the other commentators judge players without really knowing them or helping them to be better. Acknowledging that he misses being part of the team, he walks off the show and rushes to the stadium, where the crowd cheers his arrival. Roy accepts Ted's coaching offer, although Nate is clearly unhappy with the decision.

== Development ==
=== Production ===
The episode was directed by Erica Dunton and written by executive producer Bill Wrubel. This was Dunton's first directing credit, and Wrubel's first writing credit for the show.

=== Writing ===
According to Brett Goldstein, the writers always intended Roy to coach at AFC Richmond for the season. He also added, "More the discussion was how long we could hold it off, how long could we keep Roy away from Richmond without it being an issue."

== Critical reviews ==
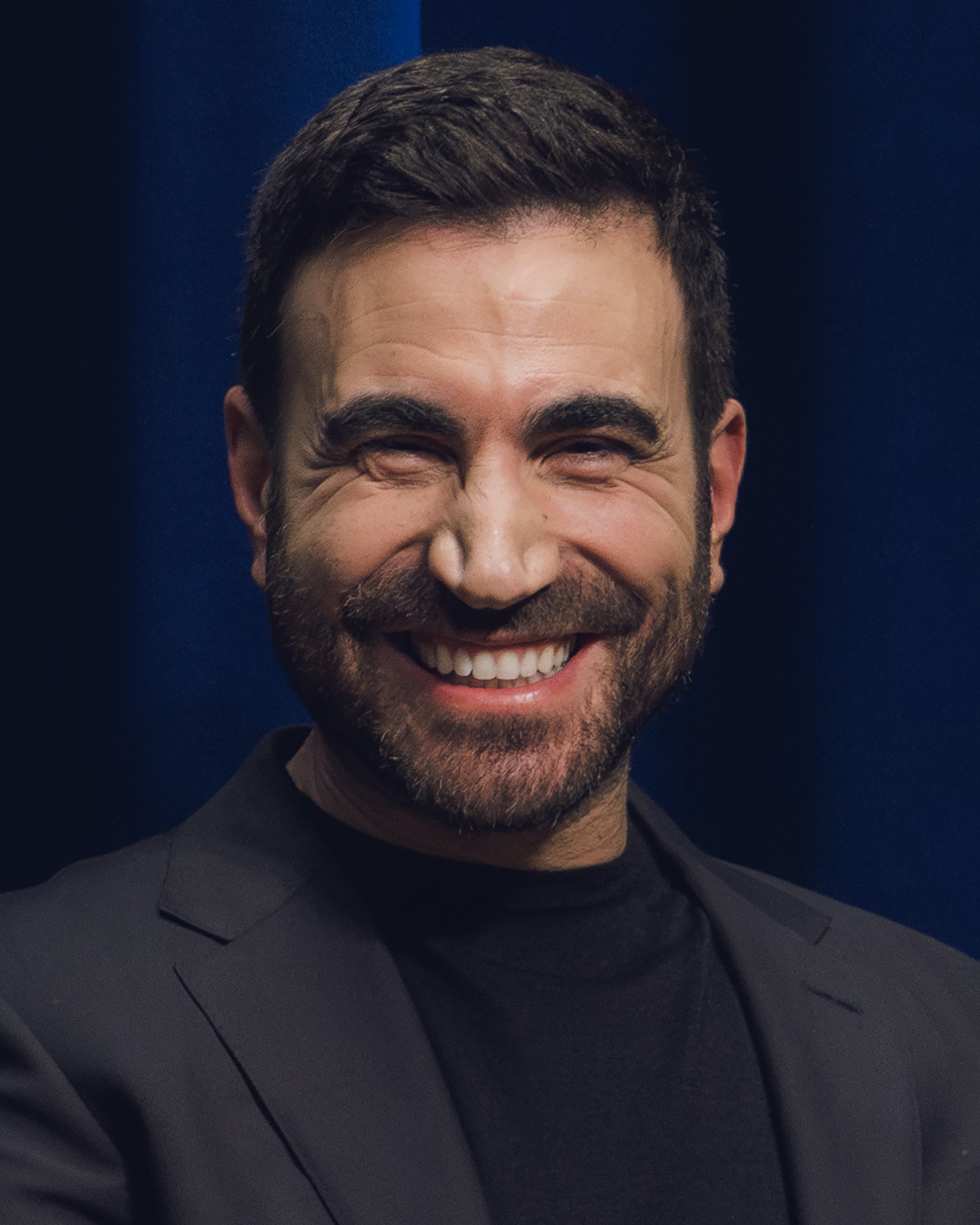
For his performance in the episode, Brett Goldstein won Outstanding Supporting Actor in a Comedy Series at the 74th Primetime Emmy Awards.

"Rainbow" received positive reviews from critics. Myles McNutt of The A.V. Club gave the episode a "B-" and wrote, "I remain charmed by Ted Lasso's micro-level whimsy, whether it's the Sheffield Wednesday repartee or the notion that Roy Kent once dated Gina Gershon, but what 'Rainbow' reinforced is that extending to macro-level whimsy as this RomCom theme did doesn't work as well. Between the lack of fallout from Sam's protest, the missed connections on Nate's behavior, and the cutesiness of the whole affair, it's an episode that I liked better the second time I watched it when I wasn't focused as much on all that and could simply take in the show's base-level pleasures. In other words, it's an example of how writing about this show in this format may in some ways be antithetical to its way of being, even if I do feel like that tension reveals some missed opportunities worth digging into."

Alan Sepinwall of Rolling Stone wrote, "'Rainbow' fumbles a few of this season's ongoing subplots, but it also gets the most important part exactly right. And when you want to spend the rest of your life with a show that makes you happy, you want the rest of your life to start as soon as possible, right?"

Keith Phipps of Vulture gave the episode a perfect 5 star rating out of 5 and wrote, "Is this the second season's best episode? Is it Ted Lasso's best episode? It has to be up there. Just about everyone gets a great moment or a great line (even the otherwise sidelined Jamie makes a fun contribution to the rom-com discussion), it pushes the season-long story in some intriguing new directions, and the final stretch, set to the Higginses favorite song, is spectacular. What more could you ask for?" Becca Newton of TV Fanatic gave the episode a perfect 5 star rating out of 5 and wrote, "Wow! Since Ted Lasso began airing, there have been episodes rated the most passionate, the most pure. 'Rainbow' blew them all away."

Linda Holmes of NPR wrote, "People have tried a lot of ways to describe how Ted Lasso feels: it's like a warm hug, it's like a comfortable blanket, it's a pandemic balm, it's a feel-good chocolate cake in your belly, whatever. But what makes it that way is rarely discussed with specificity: The show is the way it is because it's almost exclusively a nested and interlocked set of well-built love stories." Christopher Orr of The New York Times wrote, "Last week, we had a hyper-meta episode framed around Love Actually. This week, we have a hyper-meta episode framed around romantic comedies more broadly."

=== Awards and accolades ===
TVLine named Nick Mohammed as an honorable mention as the "Performer of the Week" for the week of August 21, 2021, for his performance in the episode. The site wrote, "As Ted Lasso's cowering kit man-turned-assistant coach Nathan Shelley, Nick Mohammed has spent the last season and a half talking under his breath. But during Friday's episode, the actor got to play the character at both his most timid and his most brazen — and he excelled on both fronts."

Brett Goldstein submitted this episode for consideration for his Primetime Emmy Award for Outstanding Supporting Actor in a Comedy Series nomination at the 74th Primetime Emmy Awards. He would win the award, his second Emmy win.
