= Carol of the Bells (Ted Lasso) =

- Ted Lasso episode
- Episode no.: Season 2 Episode 4
- Directed by: Declan Lowney
- Written by: Joe Kelly
- Cinematography by: David Rom
- Editing by: A.J. Catoline
- Original release date: August 13, 2021
- Running time: 30 minutes

Guest appearances
- Toheeb Jimoh as Sam Obisanya; Cristo Fernández as Dani Rojas; Kola Bokinni as Isaac McAdoo; Andrea Anders as Michelle Lasso; Claire Skinner as Dr. Rogers

Episode chronology
← Previous "Do the Right-est Thing"	Next → "Rainbow"

"Carol of the Bells" is the fourth episode of the second season of the American sports comedy-drama television series Ted Lasso, based on the character played by Jason Sudeikis in a series of promos for NBC Sports' coverage of England's Premier League. It is the 14th overall episode of the series and was written by executive producer Joe Kelly and directed by supervising producer Declan Lowney. It was released on Apple TV+ on August 13, 2021.

The series follows Ted Lasso, an American college football coach, who is unexpectedly recruited to coach a fictional English Premier League soccer team, AFC Richmond, despite having no experience coaching soccer. The team's owner, Rebecca Welton, hires Lasso hoping he will fail as a means of exacting revenge on the team's previous owner, Rupert, her unfaithful ex-husband. The previous season saw Rebecca change her mind on the club's direction and working with Ted in saving it, although the club is relegated from the Premier League. In the episode, the characters celebrate Christmas with different experiences.

The episode received critical acclaim, with critics praising the episode's wholesome nature, writing, performances and emotional tone.

== Plot ==
It's Christmas and AFC Richmond is celebrating in different ways.

Roy's (Brett Goldstein) and Keeley's (Juno Temple) plans for "Sexy Christmas" are put on hold when Roy's surgeon sister is called in to perform an emergency procedure and leaves her daughter Phoebe to stay with her uncle Roy. Phoebe is distraught because a classmate mocked her for bad breath, which Roy and Keeley smell and confirm, reassuring Phoebe her breath is so bad something must be wrong medically.

Meanwhile, Higgins (Jeremy Swift) hosts a Christmas party at his house with his family, inviting the players who can't travel home for the holiday, something he does annually. Although their invitation is usually accepted by only a few players, Higgins and family are joined first by Sam (Toheeb Jimoh), then Dani (Cristo Fernández) and most of the other players, all of whom bring traditional foods to the dinner.

Ted (Jason Sudeikis) spends Christmas Day video-calling Henry and Michelle (Andrea Anders), but the expensive drone Ted bought for his son causes Henry to run outside to play with it. Michelle awkwardly wishes him a Merry Christmas and hangs up, making Ted feel he failed. He is preparing to spend Christmas drinking and watching It's a Wonderful Life, when Rebecca (Hannah Waddingham) appears outside his apartment. Aware that this is the first Christmas after his divorce, she invites him to join her in delivering gifts to underprivileged children in Richmond. His spirits lifted, he thanks Rebecca for her help.

Roy and Keeley go door to door through Richmond trying to find a dentist who can help with Phoebe's bad breath. As night falls, they find a woman, Dr. Rogers (Claire Skinner) who can help them. She explains that the bad breath is due to Phoebe's new antihistamine, prescribed because she is allergic to her new cat Dauphine. After receiving a prescription to fix her breath, Phoebe goes to the home of the boy who mocked her and, in a play on a scene from Love Actually, tells him she felt hurt by his comments, that he should know better, but that she forgives him, prompting him to apologize. Later, as Higgins celebrates with the club at his house, they find Ted and Rebecca outside singing "Christmas (Baby Please Come Home)" with a street band. Everyone joins outside the house to sing and dance.

== Development ==
=== Production ===
The episode was directed by supervising producer Declan Lowney and written by executive producer Joe Kelly. This was Lowney's fifth directing credit, and Kelly's fifth writing credit for the show.

=== Writing ===
The episode, like "Beard After Hours", were not originally planned for the season. Originally, the season would consist of 10 episodes, until Apple TV+ expanded it by ordering two more episodes. As the writers already broke down the season's structure, they opted to add stand-alone episodes. Writer Joe Kelly said that the episode's placement was done "when shit goes down and is about to go down."

== Critical reviews ==
"Carol of the Bells" received critical acclaim. Myles McNutt of The A.V. Club gave the episode an "A" and wrote, "'Carol Of The Bells' is undoubtedly crowd-pleasing, if not necessarily an instant Christmas classic. I certainly will never turn down an opportunity to spend quality time with these characters just hanging out, but I left this welcome respite for the holidays a bit anxious to see how the second half of the team's season — and the remaining eight episodes of the show's season — will take the building blocks from the first few episodes and expand on them."

Alan Sepinwall of Rolling Stone wrote, "Season One skipped over Christmas altogether, perhaps because Ted and Rebecca's relationship was still too frosty, and the team still too fractured. Clearly, though, this needs to become an annual tradition, with Ted and company bringing the warmth of the holidays to these brutally hot midsummer days."

Keith Phipps of Vulture gave the episode a perfect 5 star rating out of 5 and wrote, "Done wrong, Christmastime ambition can get the better of a show, making it descend into soppiness. But done right, a Christmas episode can crystalize everything that makes a comedy great. 'Carol of the Bells' does it right, and it does right in an inconspicuous, almost sneaky way. It doesn't feel like it's going to end in a big moment, say one in which much of the cast shares a sing-along in a picturesque snowy street. Yet, when that moment arrives, it feels not just right but inevitable. It's a sweet, funny episode that explores the central Ted Lasso theme of what it means to be a good, generous person without making anyone behave out of character or getting cute about it." Becca Newton of TV Fanatic gave the episode a 4.4 star rating out of 5 and wrote, "Watching the characters sing, have fun, and be silly led to a couple of realizations. Ted Lasso doesn't need heavy plotting to be entertaining, and wouldn't it be great if the show did an episode where the characters don't do much but hang out? Fittingly, the Christmas-themed 'Carol of the Bells' grants this wish."

Linda Holmes of NPR wrote, "The Christmas episode is a standard of television — and especially of British television, which Ted Lasso is not, but which it sometimes, for brief moments, feels like it is. In this particular Christmas episode, even though Ted is feeling blue, the team finds joy in bonding over dinner, while Roy and Keeley try out door-to-door dentistry." Christopher Orr of The New York Times wrote, "Did I enjoy the episode? Absolutely. Does it make me worry for the future of Ted Lasso? Absolutely squared."
