= No Weddings and a Funeral (Ted Lasso) =

- Ted Lasso episode
- Episode no.: Season 2 Episode 10
- Directed by: MJ Delaney
- Written by: Jane Becker
- Cinematography by: David Rom
- Editing by: A.J. Catoline
- Original release date: September 24, 2021
- Running time: 46 minutes

Guest appearances
- Anthony Head as Rupert Mannion; Toheeb Jimoh as Sam Obisanya; Cristo Fernández as Dani Rojas; Kola Bokinni as Isaac McAdoo; Harriet Walter as Deborah Welton; Ellie Taylor as Flo "Sassy" Collins

Episode chronology
← Previous "Beard After Hours"	Next → "Midnight Train to Royston"

"No Weddings and a Funeral" is the tenth episode of the second season of the American sports comedy-drama television series Ted Lasso, based on the character played by Jason Sudeikis in a series of promos for NBC Sports' coverage of England's Premier League. It is the 20th overall episode of the series and was written by co-executive producer Jane Becker and directed by MJ Delaney. It was released on Apple TV+ on September 24, 2021.

The series follows Ted Lasso, an American college football coach, who is unexpectedly recruited to coach a fictional English Premier League soccer team, AFC Richmond, despite having no experience coaching soccer. The team's owner, Rebecca Welton, hires Lasso hoping he will fail as a means of exacting revenge on the team's previous owner, Rupert, her unfaithful ex-husband. The previous season saw Rebecca change her mind on the club's direction and working with Ted to save it, although the club is relegated from the Premier League. In the episode, Rebecca's father dies and while the club attends his funeral, she is struggling in forgiving her father for all the damage he did. Meanwhile, Ted opens up to Sharon about his father's suicide.

The episode received extremely positive reviews from critics, who praised Waddingham's and Sudeikis' acting, therapy scenes and emotional tone. Some, however, criticized the subplot with Keeley and Jamie. For their work in the episode, Jason Sudeikis won Outstanding Lead Actor in a Comedy Series while MJ Delaney won Outstanding Directing for a Comedy Series at the 74th Primetime Emmy Awards. Additionally, Hannah Waddingham was nominated for Outstanding Supporting Actress in a Comedy Series while Jane Becker was nominated for Outstanding Writing for a Comedy Series.

== Plot ==
Rebecca (Hannah Waddingham) and Sam (Toheeb Jimoh) continue dating in secret. One morning, Rebecca's mother, Deborah (Harriet Walter) surprises her at home and informs her that Rebecca's father has died. The club intends to attend the funeral to support her. As he prepares to leave for the funeral, Ted (Jason Sudeikis) has a panic attack. He calls Sharon (Sarah Niles), who comes over to help him.

At the funeral, Rupert (Anthony Head) shows up with his wife Bex, despite not being invited. They also bring their infant daughter, Diane, which infuriates Rebecca. To comfort her, Keeley (Juno Temple) and Sassy (Ellie Taylor) split a bottle of wine with her and express their suspicions that Rebecca is dating someone. When Deborah says she is and Keeley asks if it's Sam, Rebecca confirms it, to their surprise. While the club is arriving at the funeral, Ted has a therapy session with Sharon. He opens up about his father's suicide, saying that he still partly hates him for "quitting" and for rarely being home. He tells her how he was in the house when his father shot himself, and he had to call 911 and his mother. Sharon asks Ted to remember something good about his father and helps him understand that his father was a better father than he realized.

Deborah wants Rebecca to deliver a eulogy, but she refuses. Rebecca says she discovered her father cheating on Deborah when she was a child and that she holds a grudge and still hates him for it. Deborah admits she knew about his infidelity but still loved her husband and tells Rebecca she understands if she hates her as well. Rebecca decides to deliver the eulogy, and Ted arrives just as she begins. She starts to sing "Never Gonna Give You Up", a song that her parents loved. When Rebecca breaks down, Ted picks up the song and is joined by the other attendees.

After the funeral, Rupert offers Rebecca his wife's shares in Richmond, which she accepts, and he briefly talks with Nate (Nick Mohammed) as he is leaving. At the post-funeral gathering, Jamie (Phil Dunster) approaches Keeley and tells her that she is part of why he returned to Richmond and that he loves her, leaving her confused. Then Roy also tells her he loves her. Rebecca tells Sam that they must break up, claiming she needs time, and later joins her mother in looking at photos and home videos of her childhood.

== Development ==
=== Production ===
The episode was directed by MJ Delaney and written by co-executive producer Jane Becker. This was Delaney's third directing credit, and Becker's second writing credit for the show.

=== Music ===
The episode makes use of the song "Never Gonna Give You Up" by Rick Astley. Astley praised Waddingham's acting in the scene, saying "I was just completely blown away with what they did with that song."

== Critical reviews ==
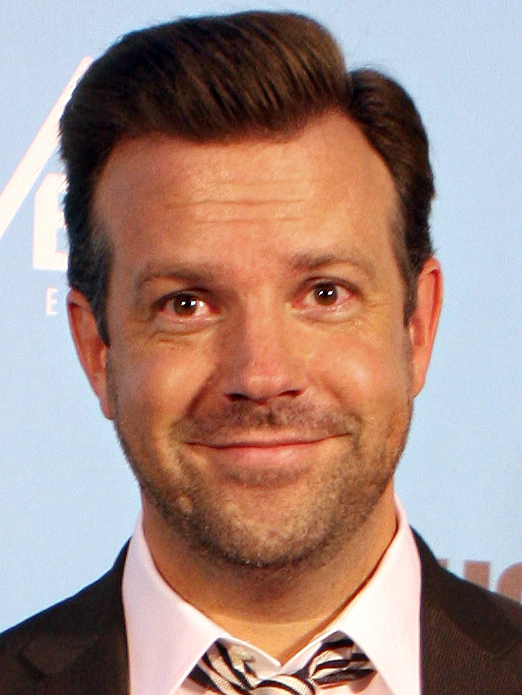
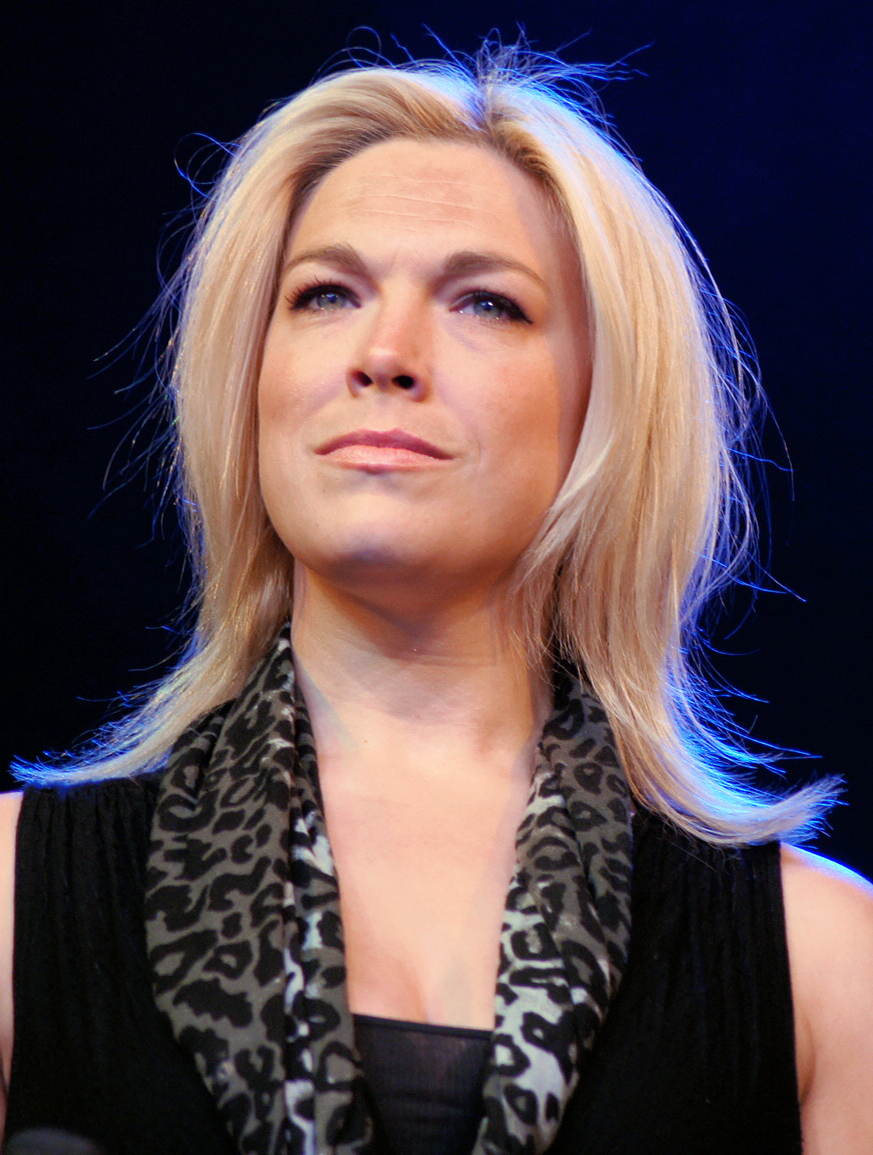
For the episode, Jason Sudeikis (left) and Hannah Waddingham (right) were nominated for Outstanding Lead Actor in a Comedy Series and Outstanding Supporting Actress in a Comedy Series at the 73rd Primetime Emmy Awards, with Sudeikis winning.

"No Weddings and a Funeral" received extremely positive reviews from critics. Myles McNutt of The A.V. Club gave the episode a "B+" and wrote, "With the entirety of the team ditching their trainers for the occasion, and Sassy and Nora returning to the fold, 'No Weddings And A Funeral' uses its longer running time to deliver lots of small moments of joy, in addition to Rebecca's Rickroll eulogy serving as an emotional anchor for the funeral itself. And while I do think that this much time spent away from the pitch reinforces the risks associated with Beard's detour last week, there's enough fuel in those small moments here to generate momentum, and hopefully bring us a step or two closer to pulling the season's various threads together. What's clear here, though, is that the writers may have overreached on how some of these arcs are meant to converge, which is going to create some hurdles to bringing everything full circle by the time Richmond's do-or-die moment comes at season's end."

Alan Sepinwall of Rolling Stone wrote, "If Keeley does wind up seriously considering Jamie, then the Ted writers have not been doing a great job of setting that up so far. But the Rebecca and Ted scenes this week were pretty great, even before they Rickrolled the funeral together."

Keith Phipps of Vulture gave the episode a perfect 5 star rating out of 5 and wrote, "'No Weddings and a Funeral', the tenth episode of Ted Lasso's second season, gets a lot right about loss, including the way seemingly frivolous bits of the past take on new meaning with the passing of time." Becca Newton of TV Fanatic gave the episode a 4.7 star rating out of 5 and wrote, "Death upends everything. In the wake of the sudden passing of Rebecca's father, Ted and Rebecca reckon with the past. It causes Nate, Keeley, and Jamie to rethink their present circumstances, and it could bring down AFC Richmond's future. With Ted Lasso Season 2 coming to a close, we kind of find ourselves in a similar position."

Linda Holmes of NPR wrote, "It's not unusual for densely packed seasons full of stories to look a little like they're careening toward the finish line a little too fast and not entirely in control, and when that happens, they often bring it home just fine. As always, the end of the season can be a nail-biter." Christopher Orr of The New York Times wrote, "'No Weddings and a Funeral' — I won't lie, I think my headline is a better title — is, at 46 minutes, another lengthy episode. It is also the most intense and emotionally revealing episode to date, and perhaps the best of the season."

=== Awards and accolades ===
TVLine named Hannah Waddingham as the "Performer of the Week" for the week of September 25, 2021, for her performance in the episode. The site wrote, "We're not saying Waddingham already has her second Emmy in the bag, but it's hard not to imagine the actress repeating her recent win after watching her triumphant turn in Episode 10 of the Apple TV+ comedy. The outing allowed her to showcase all the different sides to her character as Rebecca navigated a sea of mixed emotions surrounding her secret fling with Sam and the sudden loss of her father."

Jason Sudeikis and Waddingham submitted this episode for consideration for their Primetime Emmy Award for Outstanding Lead Actor in a Comedy Series and Primetime Emmy Award for Outstanding Supporting Actress in a Comedy Series nominations at the 74th Primetime Emmy Awards. Sudeikis won the award while Waddingham lost the award to Sheryl Lee Ralph in Abbott Elementary.

Additionally, MJ Delaney was nominated for Outstanding Directing for a Comedy Series and Jane Becker was nominated for Outstanding Writing for a Comedy Series. Delaney won the award, while Becker lost to Abbott Elementary for "Pilot".
