= Brendan Hunt =

American actor and writer

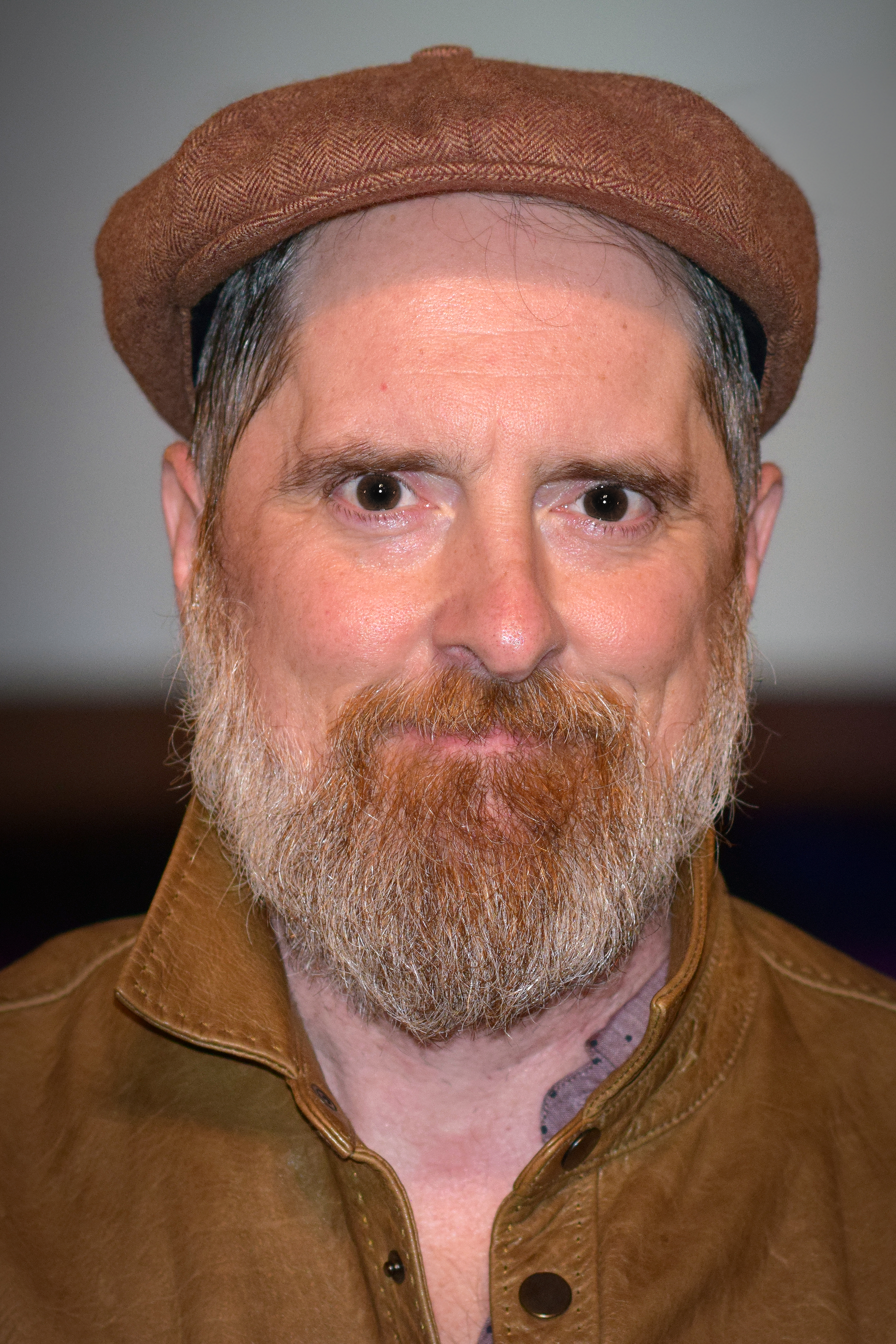
- Hunt in 2026
- Born: Chicago, Illinois, U.S.
- Education: Illinois State University (BFA)
- Occupations: Actor, comedian, screenwriter
- Years active: 1996–present
- Spouse: Shannon Nelson (m. 2025)
- Children: 2

Brendan Hunt is an American actor and writer best known as a writer and a main cast member for the Apple TV series Ted Lasso. He also has played roles in the films We're the Millers (2013) and Horrible Bosses 2 (2014) as well as voicing two characters in the video game Fallout 4 (2015). From 1998 to 2008, he was a writer and performer with the Amsterdam-based comedy and improvisational troupe Boom Chicago.

== Early life and education ==
In 1996, Hunt completed the theater program at Illinois State University. While there, he performed at the Illinois Shakespeare Festival and completed a week-long master class under the guidance of actress Judith Ivey.

== Career ==
After getting his theater degree, Hunt studied with The Second City in Chicago before heading to Amsterdam and joining the Boom Chicago comedy troupe.

=== Boom Chicago ===
From 1998 to 2008, Hunt was a regular writer and performer with the Boom Chicago comedy and improvisational troupe. Hunt was the head writer and featured in the Comedy Central (Netherlands) satirical news program Comedy Central News (CCN) that was produced by Boom Chicago. While with the group, Hunt performed alongside Jason Sudeikis (Horrible Bosses, We're the Millers, Saturday Night Live), Jordan Peele (Key and Peele) and Seth Meyers (Late Night with Seth Meyers, Saturday Night Live).

While Boom Chicago was based in Amsterdam, they embarked on a "comedy exchange" with The Second City performing at their Chicago, Illinois theater in 2003. The Chicago Tribune noted Hunt's performance as soccer star Roy Keane, calling it the "best character of the night."

While with Boom, Hunt co-wrote and co-starred in a pair of two-man shows at Edinburgh Festival Fringe: Iconic Yanks with Meyers and Here Comes the Neighborhood with Peele.

=== Five Years in Amsterdam ===
After returning to the United States, Hunt developed a one-man show based on his time in the Netherlands called Five Years in Amsterdam.

In the performance, Hunt takes a comedic and touching look back at five years living in Europe as an American. Among topics examined are relationships, drug excesses, experiences at a fetish club and his feelings about the Match of the Day anthem and Alan Hansen. He also recounts a rough childhood with "an absent father" and an alcoholic mother.

In its review, The Stage said of the show, "each drop of comedy gold is lovingly extracted in a superbly crafted, unflinchingly honest and enormously enjoyable whole" and called it a "must see" at the Edinburgh Festival Fringe.

Hunt performed the play at the 2007 edition of The Comedy Festival in Aspen, Colorado. and also took the show on the road to The Second City in Chicago, Upright Citizens Brigade in New York City and iO West in Los Angeles.

=== Sacred Fools ===
In 2007, Hunt joined the Sacred Fools Theater Company. Hunt's time at Sacred Fools included a turn as the lead in the musical Savin' Up for Saturday Night that proved to be an Ovation Awards-winning role. Hunt won Lead Actor in a Musical at the 2010 Ovation Awards.

=== Absolutely Filthy ===
In 2013, Hunt wrote and was the lead actor in a dark comedy parody of the Charlie Brown Peanuts comic strip called Absolutely Filthy. The play has won multiple awards in both Los Angeles and New York.

Hunt based his lead character, The Mess, on an older version of the character of Pig-Pen, who is now homeless and trying to cope with his recent breakup from The Bereaved, who is based on the Peanuts character Sally Brown. The setting of the play is a reunion of the old gang during the funeral of The Deceased (a version of Charlie Brown). For legal reasons, the characters were given abstract names in the program of the show, though the characters are referred to by their familiar Peanuts names on stage.

To illustrate his cloud of dust, Hunt keeps a Hula Hoop in constant motion around his body throughout the show.

Hunt came up with the idea of the play while dancing alone during the Burning Man festival with the resulting kick-up of dust in the sunrise reminding him of Pig-Pen. The play was originally created as a series of 10-minute sketches for the Sacred Fools Theater Company as part of its "Serial Killers" late-night series. Hunt was asked to turn the sketches into a single play.

The play has received overwhelmingly favorable reviews, with The New York Observer saying it creates an "endorphin high that accompanies laughing until your eyes water." The LA Weekly gave accolades for Hunt's performance, saying he "steals the show.".

Hunt and the play also won several awards. The 2013 Hollywood Fringe Festival named Absolutely Filthy as "Top of the Fringe" and Best Comedy. At the 2014 FringeNYC, the play won three awards that included an acting award for Hunt as well as prizes for overall play and TheaterMania audience favorite. Hunt was nominated in four categories in the 2014 LA Weekly Theater Awards, winning the top prize in the categories of Best Male Performance and Comedy Ensemble.

=== Film, TV and video game work ===
After roles in episodes of the television series Reno 911!, Parks and Recreation, Community and How I Met Your Mother, Hunt made his major motion picture debut as the "Sketchy Dude" in 2013's We're the Millers, which featured his Boom Chicago castmate Jason Sudeikis.

Hunt had a role in another Sudeikis vehicle, 2014's Horrible Bosses 2, playing a sex addiction group member.

An Emmy Award nomination was among the accomplishments for Hunt as a regular performer on the Comedy Central series Key & Peele. Along with appearing in several sketches, Hunt was nominated at the 67th Primetime Emmy Awards for Outstanding Writing for a Variety Special. The nomination, with Keegan-Michael Key, Jordan Peele and Rich Talarico, was for the Key & Peele Super Bowl Special.

In 2013, Hunt co-wrote a Premier League advertising campaign for NBC Sports featuring himself as an assistant coach to Tottenham Hotspur with Sudeikis. Sudeikis told GQ magazine that the two drew off their years in Amsterdam playing FIFA together before and after shows. The commercials were named as the second-best TV soccer sketch by Paste with the magazine saying, "Brilliant though Sudeikis is, the unsung hero of these sketches is Brendan Hunt." The campaign received a Bronze award at the 2014 Sports Clio Awards.

Hunt was a writer and performer in the 2015 online comedy-documentary series Thank You and Sorry for Google Play. The six-episode series featured a mix of comedy sketches and a real-life look at musician Jack Antonoff and his tours with Bleachers.

In 2015, Hunt was a voice actor as one of the main DJs in the game Fallout 4. Hunt plays DJ Travis of Diamond City Radio, whose monotone voice reflects on the surroundings of the ruins of Boston now known as the Commonwealth. Hunt also plays Detective Perry, who is seen in a holotape.

Starting in 2014, Hunt also made his mark in children and teen television with roles in the Disney Channel series Dog With a Blog and Austin & Ally, as well as Disney XD's Kirby Buckets.

Hunt co-created the series Ted Lasso, launched on Apple TV+ in 2020, and appears as a regular cast member.

He has appeared in several commercials, including ads for GEICO, Skittles, Oscar Mayer, and Volkswagen.

=== Other live performance ===
At the 2016 Hollywood Fringe Festival, Hunt debuted the one-man play Still Got It. In the show, Hunt plays a person reeling from making a bad toast at his friend's wedding. Hunt's performance was honored for top Solo Performance at the 2016 Hollywood Fringe Festival Awards.

In 2023, Hunt began performing his solo show The Movement You Need. In the show, Hunt describes his encounter with Paul McCartney and recounts his life experiences in relation to The Beatles.

In 2026, Hunt made an appearance at the 2026 FIFA World Cup Final Halftime Show. He introduced Justin Bieber as his Ted Lasso character, Coach Beard.

== Filmography ==
=== Film ===
Year	Title	Role	Notes
1999	An Amsterdam Tale	Busker	
2002	Snapshots	Hooligan in red light district	
2003	The American Bickman Burger	Peter Pike	Short
2005	The Adventures of Big Handsome Guy and His Little Friend	Bar Freak	Short
2006	Day is Done	Thin Thug	
2008	Freak Dance Prank		Short
2009	Continuum	The Scientist	Short
2013	We're the Millers	Sketchy Dude	
2013	Snail	Issac	Short
2014	ETXR	Tweaker	
2014	Horrible Bosses 2	Sex Addiction Group Member	
2017	A Happening of Monumental Proportions	Kyle	
2019	Curious George: Royal Monkey	Guard #1, News Anchor, Head Servant	Voice role
2025	Elio	Gunther Melmac	Voice role
2025	Terrestrial	S.J. Purcell	Competed in 29th Fantasia International Film Festival in Cheval Noir.

=== Television ===
Year	Title	Role	Notes
2007	Derek and Simon: The Show	Karaoke DJ	2 episodes
2007	Comedy Central News (CCN)	Recurring Player	Series on Comedy Central (Netherlands)
2009	Reno 911!	Soccer Hooligan	Episode: "Extradition to Thailand"
2010	Parks and Recreation	Man #3	Episode: "Sweetums"
2010	Everyone Counts	Glen	
2010	Svetlana	Professor Winthrop	
2011	Zeke and Luther	Johnnie King	Episode: "Trucky Cheese"
2011	Community	Hitchhiker	Episode: "Studies in Modern Movement"
2012	How I Met Your Mother	Hot Dog Guy	Episode: The Stamp Tramp
2012–2015	Key and Peele	Whittling Pirate/Suspect/The Clown/Creepy Van Guy	4 episodes
2013	The Bridge	Morgue Attendant	Episode: "Pilot"
2014	Dog with a Blog	Bill	Episode: "Stan Runs Away"
2014– 2016	Austin & Ally	Spike Stevens	2 episodes
2015	MOCKpocalypse	EDM	
2015	Thank You and Sorry	Self	Documentary
2015	Animation Domination High-Def	(voice)	Episode: "The Ballad of Ninja Turtles' Shredder"
2015	Kirby Buckets	Lead Clown	Episode: "Send In The Clowns"
2016	Son of Zorn	Eric	Episode: "A Taste of Zephyria"
2017	Girlboss	Frederick	Episode: "Vintage Fashion Forum"
2017	Casual	Rich	Episode: "Fresno"
2017	Adam Ruins Everything	Instructor/Professor Loiacono	2 episodes
2019	Cousins for Life	Miles	Episode: "Trapped for Life"
2019	Bless This Mess	Frank	2 episodes
2020–present	Ted Lasso	Coach Willis Beard	34 episodes
2023	Celebrity Jeopardy!	Himself	2 episodes
2024	After Midnight	Himself	Episode #20
2025	Phineas and Ferb	Dr. Mosley Shamai	Voice role Episode: "Deconstructing Doof"
2026	Yo Gabba Gabbaland	Himself	Episode #

=== Video games ===
Year	Title	Voice	Notes
2004	Call of Duty: Finest Hour	Additional Voices	
2015	Fallout 4	Travis Miles / Francis Perry	
2016	Earthfall	Jonas	
2017	Final Fantasy XV: Comrades	Additional Voices	
2022	FIFA 23	Coach Beard	

=== Online ===
Year	Title	Role	Notes
2012	CollegeHumor CH Originals	Sheriff/Museum Director	2 episodes
2015	Thank You and Sorry	Various	
2016	Toasty Tales	Pancakey	Voice

== Credits ==
Credits in films, television, theater and video game productions
Year	Title	Medium	Role	Notes
2007	Comedy Central News (CCN)	TV series	Head writer	
2015	Key and Peele Super Bowl Special	TV series	Writer	
2015	Thank You and Sorry	Online series	Writer	

== Accolades ==
List of awards and nominations
Year	Award / Film Festival	Category	Nominated work	Result	Ref.
2010	Ovation Awards	Lead Actor in a Musical	Savin' Up for Saturday Night	Won	
2014	LA Weekly Theater Awards	Comedy Ensemble	Absolutely Filthy	Won	
2014	LA Weekly Theater Awards	Leading Male Performance	Absolutely Filthy	Won	
2014	LA Weekly Theater Awards	Male Comedy Performance	Absolutely Filthy	Nominated	
2014	LA Weekly Theater Awards	Playwriting	Absolutely Filthy	Nominated	
2014	FringeNYC Awards	Acting	Absolutely Filthy	Won	
2015	Primetime Emmy Awards	Outstanding Writing for a Variety Special (shared with Keegan-Michael Key, Jordan Peele and Rich Talarico)	Key & Peele Super Bowl Special	Nominated	
2016	Hollywood Fringe Festival Awards	Solo Performance	Still Got It	Won	
2021	Writers Guild of America Awards	Outstanding Writing for a Comedy Series	Ted Lasso	Won	
2021	Writers Guild of America Awards	Outstanding Writing for a New Series	Ted Lasso	Won	
2021	Producers Guild of America Awards	Outstanding Production of Episodic Television, Comedy	Ted Lasso	Nominated	
2021	Screen Actors Guild Awards	Outstanding Ensemble in a Comedy Series	Ted Lasso	Nominated	
2021	Primetime Emmy Awards	Outstanding Comedy Series	Ted Lasso	Won	
2021	Primetime Emmy Awards	Outstanding Supporting Actor in a Comedy Series	Ted Lasso	Nominated	
2021	Primetime Emmy Awards	Outstanding Writing for a Comedy Series	Ted Lasso	Nominated	
2022	Primetime Emmy Awards	Outstanding Comedy Series	Ted Lasso	Won	
2022	Screen Actors Guild Awards	Outstanding Ensemble in a Comedy Series	Ted Lasso	Won	
2023	Primetime Emmy Awards	Outstanding Comedy Series	Ted Lasso	Nominated	
2023	Primetime Emmy Awards	Outstanding Writing for a Comedy Series	Ted Lasso	Nominated	
2023	Screen Actors Guild Awards	Outstanding Ensemble in a Comedy Series	Ted Lasso	Nominated	
2026	Jeff Award	Short Run Production - Performer	The Movement You Need: An Evening with Brendan Hunt	Won	https://jeffawards.org/equity-nominees
