= For the Children (Ted Lasso) =

- Ted Lasso episode
- Episode no.: Season 1 Episode 4
- Directed by: Tom Marshall
- Written by: Jamie Lee
- Cinematography by: David Rom
- Editing by: A.J. Catoline; Melissa McCoy
- Original release date: August 21, 2020
- Running time: 34 minutes

Guest appearances
- Anthony Head as Rupert Mannion; Toheeb Jimoh as Sam Obisanya

Episode chronology
← Previous "Trent Crimm: The Independent"	Next → "Tan Lines"

"For the Children" is the fourth episode of the American sports comedy-drama television series Ted Lasso, based on the character played by Jason Sudeikis in a series of promos for NBC Sports' coverage of England's Premier League. The episode was written by supervising producer Jamie Lee and directed by Tom Marshall. It was released on Apple TV+ on August 21, 2020.

The series follows Ted Lasso, an American college football coach, who is unexpectedly recruited to coach a fictional English Premier League soccer team, AFC Richmond, despite having no experience coaching soccer. The team's owner, Rebecca Welton, hires Lasso hoping he will fail as a means of exacting revenge on the team's previous owner, Rupert, her unfaithful ex-husband. In the episode, the club attends an annual charity ball hosted by Rebecca, where they run into Rupert.

The episode received positive reviews from critics, who praised the emotional tone, character development and performances. For her performance in the episode, Juno Temple was nominated for Outstanding Supporting Actress in a Comedy Series at the 73rd Primetime Emmy Awards.

== Plot ==
AFC Richmond loses 2–0 in a match, which angers Roy (Brett Goldstein). Jamie (Phil Dunster) makes an offensive comment about Sam's (Toheeb Jimoh) mother, which prompts Roy to engage him in a fight. Rebecca (Hannah Waddingham) is preparing for an annual charity ball with the club, feeling nervous as Rupert (Anthony Head) always frequented the events. She is also stressed because Robbie Williams cancelled as a musical guest, so she asks Higgins (Jeremy Swift) to find a replacement.

Ted (Jason Sudeikis) forces Jamie and Roy to share the same table in order to ease tensions, which frustrates Keeley (Juno Temple), who is accompanying Jamie as his date. At the ball, Rupert suddenly appears and takes over the auction, promising guests that they can bid to spend time with the club's players. While talking with Rupert, Ted deduces that he might have been responsible for Williams cancelling, as he personally knows him. Ted finds Rebecca outside, who laments feeling alone despite her position. Ted consoles her and motivates her to go back inside.

Acting on advice from Ted, Roy approaches Jamie with a new suggestion: they will both tell why they hate each other. After doing so, they start bonding together. While talking with Rebecca, Keeley finds that a woman who was bidding for a date with Jamie is a former lover who he hired to make himself look good. This revelation and a heated argument cause her to break up with him. The auction ends with Rupert donating one million pounds to the charity event to show Rebecca up, silently embarrassing her. To save face, Ted and Higgins bring in a street musician named Cam Cole, whom Ted had encountered earlier, to play at the event. Cam gets an enthusiastic reception from the guests. After the event, Keeley joins Rebecca in a rickshaw to get drunk.

== Development ==
=== Production ===
The character of Ted Lasso first appeared in 2013 as part of NBC Sports promoting their coverage of the Premier League, portrayed by Jason Sudeikis. In October 2019, Apple TV+ gave a series order to a series focused on the character, with Sudeikis reprising his role and co-writing the episode with executive producer Bill Lawrence. Sudeikis and collaborators Brendan Hunt and Joe Kelly started working on a project around 2015, which evolved further when Lawrence joined the series. The episode was directed by Tom Marshall and written by supervising producer Jamie Lee. This was Marshall's third directing credit, and Lee's first writing credit for the show.

=== Casting ===
The series announcement confirmed that Jason Sudeikis would reprise his role as the main character. Other actors who are credited as series regulars include Hannah Waddingham, Jeremy Swift, Phil Dunster, Brett Goldstein, Brendan Hunt, Nick Mohammed, and Juno Temple.

== Critical reviews ==
"For the Children" received positive reviews from critics. Gissane Sophia of Marvelous Geeks Media wrote, "'For the Children' allows its characters to be vulnerable enough to admit when they need help. We aren't at the peak of this detail yet, but we are getting there because what we are seeing is just how hard these characters are trying to be better. People like Rupert will always shine in the face of their cruelty, but this episode is a reminder of the fact that the right people will always see you even while the rest of the world does not."

Mads Lennon of FanSided wrote, "One of the best things about Ted Lasso's fourth episode is seeing Rebecca and Keeley bond. It's nice to see both of the female characters get the same amount of depth and development as the males on the show. By the end, Keeley has stolen two bottles of champagne and asks Rebecca to go get drunk with her, to which she heartily agrees." Daniel Hart of Ready Steady Cut gave the episode a 3.5 star rating out of 5 wrote, "'For the Children' sees some characters figure themselves out as friction in the group becomes clearer."

=== Awards and accolades ===
Juno Temple submitted this episode for consideration for her Primetime Emmy Award for Outstanding Supporting Actress in a Comedy Series nomination at the 73rd Primetime Emmy Awards. She lost the award to her co-star, Hannah Waddingham. The episode was also nominated for Outstanding Production Design for a Narrative Program (Half-Hour or Less) at the 73rd Primetime Creative Arts Emmy Awards.
