= Sam Obisanya =

Fictional character in the Ted Lasso television series

- Ted Lasso character
- First appearance: "Pilot"
- Last appearance: "Being Alive"
- Created by: Bill Lawrence; Jason Sudeikis
- Portrayed by: Toheeb Jimoh

In-universe information
- Full name: Samuel Obisanya
- Gender: Male
- Affiliation: A.F.C. Richmond
- Family: Ola Obisanya (father)
- Nationality: Nigerian
- Occupation: Football player
- Position: Midfielder
- Team: Manchester United F.C.

Samuel Obisanya is a fictional character from the television series Ted Lasso performed by Toheeb Jimoh. He is a Nigerian footballer who played as a right-back and midfielder for A.F.C. Richmond and currently plays for Manchester United F.C. He is known for his technical ability, ball control, and attacking play.

Sam was originally written as a Ghanaian. The production later changed his nationality to Nigerian after Jimoh was cast. Jimoh received praise for his portrayal of Obisanya, including a Screen Actors Guild Award (as part of an ensemble) and Celebration of Black Cinema and Television Award. He was also nominated for an Emmy and a Hollywood Critics Association TV Award.

== Character biography ==
=== Backstory ===
Sam Obisanya is a Nigerian footballer born to Ola Obisanya. He began his professional career in Nigeria before moving to England to continue playing. He joined A.F.C. Richmond from a club in the Nigerian Football League.

=== Season one ===
Sam arrived at Richmond just before the beginning of the show's first season. At age 21, he was the youngest player in the squad and initially played as a defender. Under coach Ted Lasso, Sam gradually became more confident and developed a stronger role within the team, this despite him being picked on by teammate Jamie Tartt. In "Biscuits", Ted learned Sam was homesick and arranged a birthday celebration for him before Richmond's match against Crystal Palace; Sam then performed notably well in the match. Jamie, however, continued to pick on Sam, until team captain Roy Kent stepped in.

Sam reappeared in "Two Aces", where he took part in Richmond's attempt to lift a supposed curse surrounding the team's treatment room. In "Tan Lines", Sam was hurt during a match, but Roy encouraged him to carry on. Later in the match, Roy passed the ball to Sam rather than shooting himself, allowing Sam to score the winning goal, the team's first win of the season.

=== Season two ===
Following Richmond's relegation from the Premier League, (Note: Richmond needed to win or tie its final match of the previous season to avoid relegation; however, they lost and were relegated from the Premier League to the Championship, as depicted in the season one episode "The Hope That Kills You".) Sam became more prominent in the squad as Lasso helped him transition from defender to midfielder. Sam's performances improved in this new position as he became more involved in the team's play.

Sam earned his first hat-trick for Richmond during a Championship match. Immediately after, wealthy Ghanaian business man Edwin Akufo offered to buy Sam’s contract for an African team. In the episode "Midnight Train to Royston", Akufo revealed plans to buy Raja Casablanca, a team made up of some of Africa's best footballers. He gave Sam three days to think about this offer, and while Sam was tempted by the proposal, he chose to stay with Richmond.

Sam's relationship with Rebecca Welton was one of season two’s central relationships. Sam and Rebecca started unknowingly communicating with each other on the anonymous dating app Bantr. The two learned they were communicating with each other when they met in person; they went to dinner together, then Sam brought Rebecca home, where they kissed. Later, after losing to Manchester City in the FA Cup semi-final, Rebecca messaged Sam asking if he was free. The two continued messaging, then decided to start a secret relationship.

Sam's relationship with his father, Ola Obisanya, also had a significant influence on him in season two. In "Do the Right-est Thing", Sam was offered the opportunity to appear in an advertising campaign for Dubai Air, one of Richmond's sponsors. However, after learning from his father about the environmental damage in Nigeria caused by Cerithium Oil, Sam withdrew from the campaign and during his next match, he covered the sponsor's logo on his jersey; he also spoke publicly about the relationship between the Nigerian government and Cerithium Oil. The controversy resulted in Dubai Air ending its sponsorship of Richmond, and following this, Sam became more active on issues important to him and his home country.

=== Season three ===
In addition to playing for Richmond, Sam opened a Nigerian restaurant in London named Ola's, after his father. The restaurant became a source of pride and a way for Sam to stay rooted in his heritage. This, however, was tested when Sam became involved in a Twitter feud with UK Home Secretary Brinda Barotover. Sam tweeted that he would rather be a mediocre player than a world-class bigot, and he received backlash in response. The situation escalated when Ola's was trashed by anti-immigration protesters, who defaced the restaurant with Barot's words and messages telling Sam to return to Africa. Sam's teammates later helped Sam at the restaurant.

=== Season four ===
In October 2026, Obisanya made a brief appearance at the final match of AFC Richmond Women's inaugural season, attending alongside several former teammates from the men's first team. During the match, Obisanya was seen speaking with Roy Kent, confirming that he had completed a transfer to Manchester United.

== Development and portrayal ==
Sam was originally written as Ghanaian. The production later changed his nationality to Nigerian after Toheeb Jimoh was cast. Jimoh auditioned for the role using the birthday cake scene, in which Sam rejects a toy soldier because of its association with imperialism. After Jimoh was cast, casting director Theo Park said the production was looking for an actor who could give Sam warmth and positive energy, and that about a dozen actors were considered for the role.

Jimoh's background informed his portrayal of Sam. Born in London to Nigerian parents, Jimoh moved to Nigeria as a toddler, then moved back to London at age seven. According to Jimoh, this experience helped him relate to Sam's experience as a young Nigerian living abroad. Jimoh also stated that Sam's relationship with his father, specifically Sam's father's influence as a role model who shaped his values, confidence, and understanding of masculinity, was informed by his relationship with his father.

Jimoh played football while growing up and said that playing a Nigerian character and a footballer had been ambitions of his, making this role particularly appealing to him. Jimoh’s portrayal of Sam was also influenced by his knowledge of Nigerian culture.

Jimoh's portrayal developed alongside Sam's growing prominence in the series. In the first season, Sam is reserved, adjusting to life in England while trying to find his place at Richmond, while in the second season, Sam became one of the team's leaders. Jimoh described the change as maturing from a homesick player into someone confident enough to stand by his convictions and challenge others. Of particular note was the storyline involving Sam and club sponsor Dubai Air; writer Ashley Nicole Black said this storyline was developed around the question of how young athletes can use their public platform to speak about issues they believe in.

== Reception ==
=== Critical reception ===
On the culture website Africa Is a Country, Harvard University lecturer Lilly Havstad highlighted Sam's Nigerian identity and his storylines concerning race, football, and Africa's place within the fictional professional game; she also noted that relatively little critical discussion had focused on him compared with the show's other major characters. Salon, however, was more critical of Sam's development, arguing that although he was portrayed as thoughtful, gentle, and emotionally intelligent, little about his inner life, motivations, or personal development beyond his relationships and interests were revealed.

In a review of the second season, Lucy Mangan of The Guardian highlighted Sam's storylines involving the Black Lives Matter movement and the controversy surrounding Richmond's sponsor, describing them as being handled movingly and unforced. Mangan also wrote that the series gave its supporting characters, including Sam, greater depth in the second season. Josh Spiegel of What's on TV similarly singled out Sam as one of the strongest parts of the second season, describing him as the show's "secret best part." British GQ later described Sam as the "moral beating heart" of the series, citing his kindness and development as a midfielder, and after the show's third season, Collider wrote that Sam was the only character worthy of a spin-off.

Sam's storyline in the second-season episode "Do the Right-est Thing", in which he opposes Richmond's sponsor Dubai Air, was particularly well received, with critics praising the character's development, the handling of the subject matter, and Jimoh's restrained performance. The storyline, however, also drew criticism: writing for Winnipeg Free Press, reviewer Alison Gillmor argued that while Sam's confrontation with the sponsor raised the issue of economic imperialism in Nigeria, the conflict was resolved too easily.

Sam's relationship with Rebecca received a more mixed review. In an opinion piece for The Washington Post, Alyssa Rosenberg described Sam as "endearing and seductive" but also questioned aspects of his relationship with Rebecca, including their age difference and Rebecca's position as the one who signs Sam's paychecks.

==== Race portrayal ====
Scholar Rukmini Pande, writing in the Journal of Popular Television in 2024, analyzed Sam's story in relation to race and English football. Pande wrote that the show Ted Lasso dealt with racism by focusing on what individuals do rather than looking at bigger problems in institutions. She pointed out that Sam's inner life received less attention than those of white characters on the show, and also that Sam's good portrayal can become a form of tokenism and a "post-racial" view of race.

=== Accolades ===
Awards and nominations received by Toheeb Jimoh
Award	Year	Category	Result	Ref.
Celebration of Black Cinema and Television	2021	Breakthrough Actor – Television	Won	
Hollywood Critics Association TV Awards	2022	Best Supporting Actor in a Streaming Series, Comedy	Nominated	
Primetime Emmy Awards	2022	Outstanding Supporting Actor in a Comedy Series	Nominated	
Screen Actors Guild Awards	2021	Outstanding Performance by an Ensemble in a Comedy Series	Nominated	
Screen Actors Guild Awards	2022	Outstanding Performance by an Ensemble in a Comedy Series	Won	
Screen Actors Guild Awards	2024	Outstanding Performance by an Ensemble in a Comedy Series	Nominated	

== In other media ==
Sam Obinsaya appeared in the 2023 video game FIFA 23 by EA Sports as a playable character for A.F.C. Richmond.
