= Obisanya =

Obisanya is a surname. Notable people and fictional characters with the surname include:

- Bolatito Obisanya or BMH (born 1999), Nigerian musician
- Sam Obisanya, fictional Nigerian footballer
