= All Apologies (Ted Lasso) =

- Ted Lasso episode
- Episode no.: Season 1 Episode 9
- Directed by: MJ Delaney
- Written by: Phoebe Walsh
- Cinematography by: John Sorapure
- Editing by: Melissa McCoy
- Original air date: September 25, 2020
- Running time: 31 minutes

Guest appearances
- Anthony Head as Rupert Mannion; Toheeb Jimoh as Sam Obisanya; James Lance as Trent Crimm; Annette Badland as Mae

Episode chronology
← Previous "The Diamond Dogs"	Next → "The Hope That Kills You"

"All Apologies" is the ninth episode of the American sports comedy-drama television series Ted Lasso, based on the character played by Jason Sudeikis in a series of promos for NBC Sports' coverage of England's Premier League. The episode was written by Phoebe Walsh and directed by MJ Delaney. It was released on Apple TV+ on September 25, 2020.

The series follows Ted Lasso, an American college football coach, who is unexpectedly recruited to coach a fictional English Premier League soccer team, AFC Richmond, despite having no experience coaching soccer. The team's owner, Rebecca Welton, hires Lasso hoping he will fail as a means of exacting revenge on the team's previous owner, Rupert, her unfaithful ex-husband. In the episode, Ted faces a dilemma as Roy's age is showing during training, which could jeopardize the club's performance. Meanwhile, Rebecca is pressured by Keeley to reveal the truth to Ted.

The episode received extremely positive reviews from critics, who praised the performances, emotional tone, character development and set-up for the finale. For their performances in the episode, Brett Goldstein and Hannah Waddingham won Outstanding Supporting Actor in a Comedy Series and Outstanding Supporting Actress in a Comedy Series at the 73rd Primetime Emmy Awards.

== Plot ==
Roy (Brett Goldstein) has felt pressure in the latest matches, where commentators note that his age is showing despite the club's improvement. Rebecca (Hannah Waddingham) is also pressured by Keeley (Juno Temple) to tell Ted (Jason Sudeikis) about her role in the paparazzo's photographs.

Beard (Brendan Hunt) and Nate (Nick Mohammed) suggest that Roy must be benched for their final game against Manchester City F.C., but Ted refuses to do it, causing them to stop talking to him. Ted is called to Rebecca's office, but she can't bring herself to reveal the truth. Suddenly, Rupert (Anthony Head) shows up to inform Rebecca that he is having a baby with Bex, despite having told Rebecca that he never wanted children. This prompts her to head to Ted's office and confess her plan to ruin the club to get back at Rupert – including hiring the paparazzo and having Jamie transferred back to Man City. To her surprise, Ted forgives her, explaining that divorce can negatively affect a person. His forgiveness prompts her to visit Higgins (Jeremy Swift) to apologize for everything, which he accepts.

Ted meets with Roy to discuss benching him, which Roy angrily refuses. Roy confides in Keeley that he has always defined himself by his career and is concerned that it might be ending. Keeley then has his niece, Phoebe, motivate him, and tells him that she admires him for always believing in himself. Ted meets with Beard at the pub, telling him he intends to keep Roy in the line-up, as he does not mind losing. Beard finally snaps, angrily telling him that winning is important for the club, as it is in danger of relegation. He tells him that he should not be more concerned with Roy's feelings than the club's results and storms out. A drunk Ted brings Roy to his apartment, telling him he will bench him, which Roy agrees to. To save his reputation, they agree to claim the benching due to an injury. The next day, Roy shows up for training donning a second team bib, accepting his role on the bench. As the team heads out to the pitch, Roy follows and reaches up to touch the "Believe" sign above the office door.

== Development ==
=== Production ===
The character of Ted Lasso first appeared in 2013 as part of NBC Sports promoting their coverage of the Premier League, portrayed by Jason Sudeikis. In October 2019, Apple TV+ gave a series order to a series focused on the character, with Sudeikis reprising his role and co-writing the episode with executive producer Bill Lawrence. Sudeikis and collaborators Brendan Hunt and Joe Kelly started working on a project around 2015, which evolved further when Lawrence joined the series. The episode was directed by MJ Delaney and written by Phoebe Walsh. This was Delaney's first directing credit, and Walsh's first writing credit for the show.

=== Casting ===
The series announcement confirmed that Jason Sudeikis would reprise his role as the main character. Other actors who are credited as series regulars include Hannah Waddingham, Jeremy Swift, Phil Dunster, Brett Goldstein, Brendan Hunt, Nick Mohammed, and Juno Temple.

== Critical reviews ==
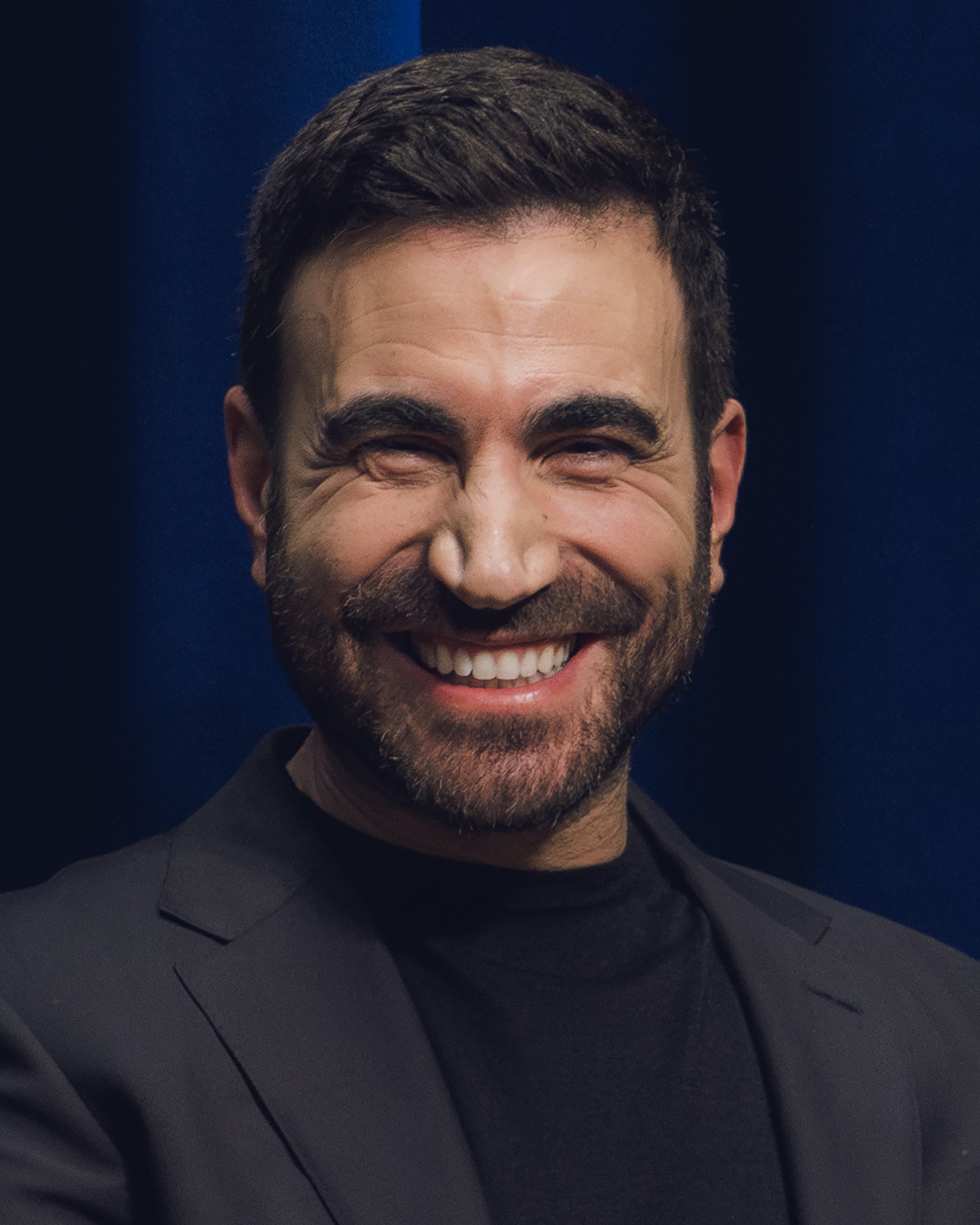
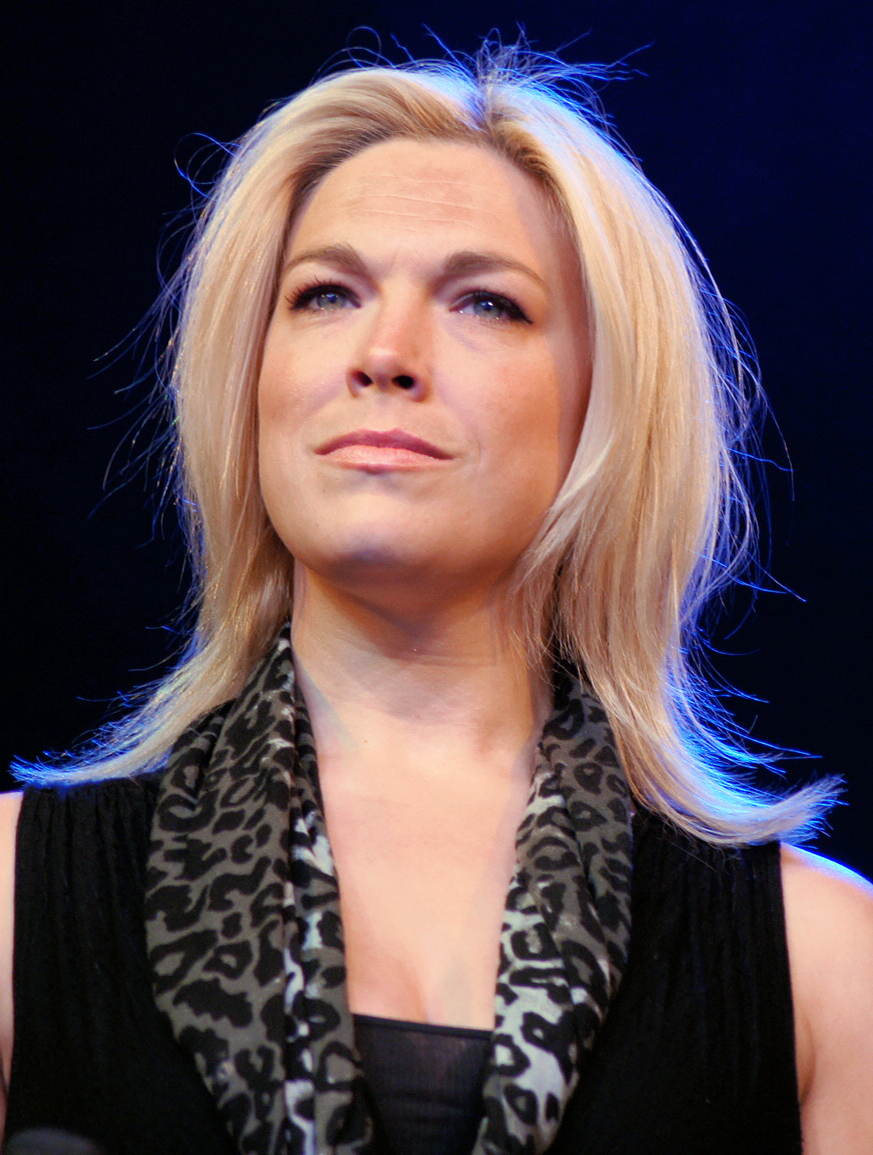
For the episode, Brett Goldstein (left) and Hannah Waddingham (right) won Outstanding Supporting Actor in a Comedy Series and Outstanding Supporting Actress in a Comedy Series at the 73rd Primetime Emmy Awards.

"All Apologies" received extremely positive reviews from critics. Gissane Sophia of Marvelous Geeks Media wrote, "'All Apologies' is the kind of episode that not only changes the trajectory of the character journeys, but it cements the thematic importance of belief that Ted Lasso is grounded in. It tells its audience that the person we choose to be, when taking frightening routes is what matters most and it reiterates the importance of an apology, which we've been seeing from the start."

Mads Lennon of FanSided wrote, "Ultimately, Ted wants Roy to attend the next practice and game, but it'll be up to him to decide. Thankfully, the next day at work is a happy one. Higgins is back, and Roy shows up to practice to support his team as a good captain should." Daniel Hart of Ready Steady Cut gave the episode a 4 star rating out of 5 wrote, "The penultimate episode is all about compassion and kindness as Ted has a big decision to make."

=== Awards and accolades ===
Brett Goldstein and Hannah Waddingham submitted this episode for consideration for their Primetime Emmy Award for Outstanding Supporting Actor in a Comedy Series and Primetime Emmy Award for Outstanding Supporting Actress in a Comedy Series nominations at the 73rd Primetime Emmy Awards. They would win their respective awards, their first Emmy wins.
