= Two Aces =

- Ted Lasso episode
- Episode no.: Season 1 Episode 6
- Directed by: Elliot Hegarty
- Written by: Bill Wrubel
- Cinematography by: John Sorapure
- Editing by: A.J. Catoline
- Original release date: September 4, 2020
- Running time: 32 minutes

Guest appearances
- Toheeb Jimoh as Sam Obisanya; Annette Badland as Mae; James Lance as Trent Crimm

Episode chronology
← Previous "Tan Lines"	Next → "Make Rebecca Great Again"

"Two Aces" is the sixth episode of the American sports comedy-drama television series Ted Lasso, based on the character played by Jason Sudeikis in a series of promos for NBC Sports' coverage of England's Premier League. The episode was written by executive producer Bill Wrubel and directed by Elliot Hegarty. It was released on Apple TV+ on September 4, 2020.

The series follows Ted Lasso, an American college football coach, who is unexpectedly recruited to coach a fictional English Premier League soccer team, A.F.C. Richmond, despite having no experience coaching soccer. The team's owner, Rebecca Welton, hires Lasso hoping he will fail as a means of exacting revenge on the team's previous owner, Rupert, her unfaithful ex-husband. In the episode, Ted tries to get Jamie to cooperate more with the club, while the club becomes convinced that there is a curse on the treatment room.

The episode received positive reviews from critics, who praised the humor, performances, tone and character development. For his performance in the episode, Brendan Hunt was nominated for Outstanding Supporting Actor in a Comedy Series at the 73rd Primetime Emmy Awards.

== Plot ==
Ted (Jason Sudeikis) returns to coaching, despite feeling distracted by the end of his marriage. During a press conference, he states that Jamie (Phil Dunster) will only compete if he adheres to his strategies. Rebecca (Hannah Waddingham) informs him that Jamie is going to return to Manchester City F.C. by the end of the season, as he is on loan to Richmond. If Jamie remains benched, Manchester City would want him back. Jamie is also refusing to train with Richmond, claiming that he is hurt.

A.F.C. Richmond welcomes Dani Rojas (Cristo Fernández), a Mexican forward, to replace Jamie's position. Dani's enthusiasm and field skills impress the team, causing Jamie to feel jealous. During training, Dani gets injured and blames the treatment room, which the whole club believes is cursed. The story is that young men were invited to come to the Richmond pitch in 1914 to tryout for the team, but actually they were recruited to join the troops fighting World War I, and 400 enlisted, few of whom returned. Their physicals were given in the Richmond treatment room, which the players believe to be haunted by their spirits. To ease fears, Ted has team members each sacrifice a special item in the treatment room to lift the curse. Jamie is not interested in participating but is convinced after talking with Keeley (Juno Temple).

Rebecca discovers that Rupert now has a new girlfriend, also named Rebecca. The media has now labeled her as "Old Rebecca", which annoys her. Sam invites her to join the team in sacrificing something in the treatment room. At the ceremony, Roy brings a blanket, Sam brings a photo of the Nigeria national football team that played at the 1994 FIFA World Cup, Nate brings sunglasses, Rebecca brings that day's newspaper, and Higgins (Jeremy Swift) brings his cat's collar. Jamie also appears, tossing in the shoes that his mother gave him to motivate him to play football. The items are burned out on the pitch, and the next morning, the club's spirits are lifted. However, Ted finds that Jamie has been recalled to Manchester City, and he is furious with Rebecca for allowing the transfer. Cheered up by Dani's claim that "football is life", Ted retires Jamie's jersey from the locker room.

== Development ==
=== Production ===
The character of Ted Lasso first appeared in 2013 as part of NBC Sports promoting their coverage of the Premier League, portrayed by Jason Sudeikis. In October 2019, Apple TV+ gave a series order to a series focused on the character, with Sudeikis reprising his role and co-writing the episode with executive producer Bill Lawrence. Sudeikis and collaborators Brendan Hunt and Joe Kelly started working on a project around 2015, which evolved further when Lawrence joined the series. The episode was directed by Elliot Hegarty and written by executive producer Bill Wrubel. This was Hegarty's second directing credit, and Wrubel's first writing credit for the show.

=== Casting ===
The series announcement confirmed that Jason Sudeikis would reprise his role as the main character. Other actors who are credited as series regulars include Hannah Waddingham, Jeremy Swift, Phil Dunster, Brett Goldstein, Brendan Hunt, Nick Mohammed, and Juno Temple.

== Critical reviews ==
"Two Aces" received positive reviews from critics. Gissane Sophia of Marvelous Geeks Media wrote, "At the end of the day, this team and this showcase is all for tangible growth and change. 'Two Aces' reminds the audience of the fact that softness is a strength, and that teamwork really makes the dream work. On any other show, I'd scream enough with the metaphors, but on Ted Lasso, it works. It always works."

Mads Lennon of FanSided wrote, "New team member Dani Rojas joins AFC Richmond in the episode. Dani turns out to be an incredible soccer player, which is fantastic for Ted since he's still struggling to get Jamie to cooperate with the team. He refuses to attend practice, triggering a rare blow-up from the usually genial coach. If it sounded familiar to you, it's because the series was cleverly parodying the infamous Allen Iverson rant." Daniel Hart of Ready Steady Cut gave the episode a 3.5 star rating out of 5 wrote, "'Two Aces' sees Ted go to great lengths to help raise team spirit."

=== Awards and accolades ===
Brendan Hunt submitted this episode for consideration for his Primetime Emmy Award for Outstanding Supporting Actor in a Comedy Series nomination at the 73rd Primetime Emmy Awards. He lost the award to his co-star, Brett Goldstein.
