= Diamond Dogs (disambiguation) =

Diamond Dogs is an album by David Bowie.

Diamond Dogs may also refer to:

- Diamond Dogs (band), a Swedish rock band
- "Diamond Dogs" (song), a single by David Bowie, title track for the album of the same name
- Diamond Dogs (film), a 2007 action thriller starring Dolph Lundgren
- "Diamond Dogs" (Law & Order: Criminal Intent), an episode of Law & Order: Criminal Intent
- "The Diamond Dogs" (Ted Lasso), an episode of Ted Lasso
- Diamond Dogs (novella), a novella by Alastair Reynolds included in Diamond Dogs, Turquoise Days
- Diamond Dogs, 37th episode of 1st season of 101 Dalmatian Street
- Albany-Colonie Diamond Dogs, a defunct minor league baseball team
- Diamond Dogs, an organization in Metal Gear Solid V: The Phantom Pain
- The antagonists in "A Dog and Pony Show" episode 19 of My Little Pony: Friendship Is Magic (season 1)
- A group of performer-prostitute characters in the 2001 film Moulin Rouge!
