= Lavender (Ted Lasso) =

- Ted Lasso episode
- Episode no.: Season 2 Episode 2
- Directed by: Declan Lowney
- Written by: Leann Bowen
- Cinematography by: John Sorapure
- Editing by: A.J. Catoline
- Original release date: July 30, 2021
- Running time: 33 minutes

Guest appearances
- Toheeb Jimoh as Sam Obisanya; Cristo Fernández as Dani Rojas; Kola Bokinni as Isaac McAdoo; Annette Badland as Mae; Ruth Bradley as Mrs. Bowen

Episode chronology
← Previous "Goodbye Earl"	Next → "Do the Right-est Thing"

"Lavender" is the second episode of the second season of the American sports comedy-drama television series Ted Lasso, based on the character played by Jason Sudeikis in a series of promos for NBC Sports' coverage of England's Premier League. It is the 12th overall episode of the series and was written by producer Leann Bowen and directed by supervising producer Declan Lowney. It was released on Apple TV+ on July 30, 2021.

The series follows Ted Lasso, an American college football coach, who is unexpectedly recruited to coach a fictional English Premier League soccer team, AFC Richmond, despite having no experience coaching soccer. The team's owner, Rebecca Welton, hires Lasso hoping he will fail as a means of exacting revenge on the team's previous owner, Rupert, her unfaithful ex-husband. The previous season saw Rebecca change her mind on the club's direction and working Ted in saving it, although the club is relegated from the Premier League. In the episode, Ted faces a dilemma as the club's performance is struggling, considering if he should bring back Jamie to the club.

The episode received extremely positive reviews from critics, who praised the character development, writing, humor and performances.

== Plot ==
After being voted out from Lust Conquers All, Jamie (Phil Dunster) is shocked to discover that Manchester City F.C. is not interested in him returning to the club after he left the club for Lust Conquers All. He is also considered "a liability" by other teams due to his arrogant nature with the club and on the camera.

With Higgins (Jeremy Swift) hiring Sharon (Sarah Niles) for the season, Ted (Jason Sudeikis) tries to befriend her, although she is more interested in seeing his coaching methods. Meanwhile, Roy (Brett Goldstein) is disheartened when the girls' team he is coaching loses a championship. Returning to the apartment, he finds Keeley (Juno Temple) masturbating to his emotional retirement announcement, which upsets him. She finally convinces him to accept a part-time job as a Sky Sports commentator.

Jamie meets with Ted at the pub, hoping to get back with AFC Richmond. When questioned by Ted, Jamie reveals that he left Manchester City because he wanted to annoy his demanding father. Even though Ted understands his situation, he says he cannot let him re-join the team, which Jamie accepts. Their encounter is photographed and posted by some fans, making the team believe that Ted was bringing Jamie back. During training, Sam (Toheeb Jimoh) refuses to properly train, believing that Jamie will return despite his bullying. Ted tells him that Jamie is not returning to the club. Still, he talks with Higgins, Beard (Brendan Hunt) and Nate (Nick Mohammed) about bringing Jamie back, feeling he deserves a second chance. Higgins supports the decision, but Beard and Nate oppose his return.

During his first day at Sky Sports, Roy causes problems with his use of heavy cursing on live television. In contrast, the audience is far more positive about his honesty. This motivates the network to ask him to return, with Roy admitting that he enjoyed the job. At night, Ted talks with Sharon, who notes that their eight-tie streak should be a concern for Ted and he must consider what is the best choice for the club. The next day, to the club's surprise, Jamie shows up for training, having been accepted by Ted.

== Development ==
=== Title ===
The episode's title is a reference to rock band Marillion's classic 1985 song "Lavender".

=== Production ===
The episode was directed by supervising producer Declan Lowney and written by producer Leann Bowen. This was Lowney's fourth directing credit, and Bowen's second writing credit for the show.

== Critical reviews ==
"Lavender" received extremely positive reviews from critics. Myles McNutt of The A.V. Club gave the episode an "A–" and wrote, "Regardless, the idea of how, when, and for what/whom we take responsibility feels especially prudent in the wake of Jamie's return, and will be a critical question to Ted to ask himself and his friends until the point at which he decides that he might need to talk to Dr. Fieldstone about it instead."

Alan Sepinwall of Rolling Stone wrote, "Is Ted Lasso a good coach, or just a good person? Are the two mutually exclusive? This was occasionally a source of conflict a year ago, when Coach Beard or Nate would point out all the aspects of soccer football that Ted still didn't understand, or suggest that the team's good vibes wouldn't matter if they didn't win. But for the most part, Season One was on Ted's side in the belief that making everyone associated with AFC Richmond feel better would eventually make the team play better. Two episodes into this new season, that idea is already being challenged."

Keith Phipps of Vulture gave the episode a 4 star rating out of 5 and wrote, "What makes Ted Lasso work? We could probably spend hours trying to crack that nut, and it might make the show less fun if we succeeded. But here's one element contributing a lot to its success: Ted Lasso works because it's concerned with what makes Ted Lasso work. It would be easy for Jason Sudeikis to make Ted into a smiling Guru of the Great Plains who always has all the answers and the right words to turn those answers into pithy phrases. And often Ted does play that role, and well. But Ted's not right all the time. He's gambled, for instance, on niceness being the answer to all of AFC Richmond's problems when it might only be an answer to some of the team's problems. And he's not always honest with himself about his limitations, including his ability to generate goodwill with humor and charm." Becca Newton of TV Fanatic gave the episode a 4.2 star rating out of 5 and wrote, "What makes Ted Lasso stand out in the sea of television is its refusal to treat its characters like jokes. Ted Lasso characters say and do funny things, but they aren't jokes. Not even Jamie Tartt."

Linda Holmes of NPR wrote, "Jamie Tartt has hit bottom, but is it too late for him to return to AFC Richmond? Maybe not, but the team is not warm to the idea. Elsewhere, Roy Kent finally finds something to do when coaching season is over." Christopher Orr of The New York Times wrote, "So here we are: Jamie is back, for now, taking the field to Queen's 'Tear It Up.' Time will tell if that's what he does — in a bad way or a good one — to the harmonious but still underachieving AFC Richmond."
