= Goodbye Earl (Ted Lasso) =

- Ted Lasso episode
- Episode no.: Season 2 Episode 1
- Directed by: Declan Lowney
- Written by: Brendan Hunt
- Cinematography by: John Sorapure
- Editing by: Melissa McCoy
- Original release date: July 23, 2021
- Running time: 34 minutes

Guest appearances
- Toheeb Jimoh as Sam Obisanya; Cristo Fernández as Dani Rojas; Kola Bokinni as Isaac McAdoo; Annette Badland as Mae; James Lance as Trent Crimm; Ruth Bradley as Mrs. Bowen; Patrick Baladi as John Wingsnight

Episode chronology
← Previous "The Hope That Kills You"	Next → "Lavender"

"Goodbye Earl" is the first episode of the second season of the American sports comedy-drama television series Ted Lasso, based on the character played by Jason Sudeikis in a series of promos for NBC Sports' coverage of England's Premier League. It is the 11th overall episode of the series and was written by main cast member Brendan Hunt and directed by supervising producer Declan Lowney. It was released on Apple TV+ on July 23, 2021.

The series follows Ted Lasso, an American college football coach, who is unexpectedly recruited to coach a fictional English Premier League soccer team, AFC Richmond, despite having no experience coaching soccer. The team's owner, Rebecca Welton, hires Lasso hoping he will fail as a means of exacting revenge on the team's previous owner, Rupert, her unfaithful ex-husband. The previous season saw Rebecca change her mind on the club's direction and working Ted in saving it, although the club is relegated from the Premier League. In the episode, Dani's enthusiasm for soccer dies when he accidentally kills the club's mascot during a game, forcing Ted to hire a psychiatrist for help.

The episode received positive reviews from critics, who praised the performances, new storylines, directing and humor.

== Plot ==
AFC Richmond is now midseason in the EFL Championship, hoping to eventually earn a promotion to the Premier League, having tied every game of the season. During a match against Nottingham Forest F.C., Dani (Cristo Fernández) is about to try to score via a penalty kick to win the game. However, Richmond's mascot Earl Greyhound jumps onto the field to attack a bird just as Dani kicks the ball, accidentally hitting and killing Earl.

The incident causes Dani to feel guilt-ridden and lose confidence in his skills, having nightmares and being unable to score a single goal during training. This scares Ted and Beard (Brendan Hunt), who are convinced that Dani has the "yips". Meanwhile, Roy (Brett Goldstein) has retired and is now coaching his niece's Under 9 Girls Football team. Keeley (Juno Temple) tries to convince him to take a job as a Sky Sports commentator, but Roy flatly refuses to do it. That night, they go on a double date with Rebecca (Hannah Waddingham) and her new boyfriend, John (Patrick Baladi). After the date is over, Roy tells Rebecca that John is just an average and boring person and that she deserves someone better. The next morning, Rebecca breaks up with John.

Deciding that they need a psychologist to help Dani, Richmond hires Dr. Sharon Fieldstone (Sarah Niles). She takes the office previously occupied by Higgins (Jeremy Swift), but her direct and disciplined attitude clashes with Ted. After talking with Sharon, Dani returns to the field with his customary enthusiasm for training and scores a goal via a corner kick. Questioned by Ted, Dani explains that she helped him understand that besides life and death, "football is football too". The success of Dani's therapy prompts other players to ask Sharon for sessions. That night, Roy joins his yoga group for a watch party of Lust Conquers All (a Love Island-style reality show). One of the contestants turns out to be Jamie (Phil Dunster), whom the yoga group adores, much to Roy's chagrin.

== Development ==
=== Production ===
The episode was directed by supervising producer Declan Lowney and written by main cast member Brendan Hunt. This was Lowney's third directing credit, and Hunt's fifth writing credit for the show.

== Critical reviews ==
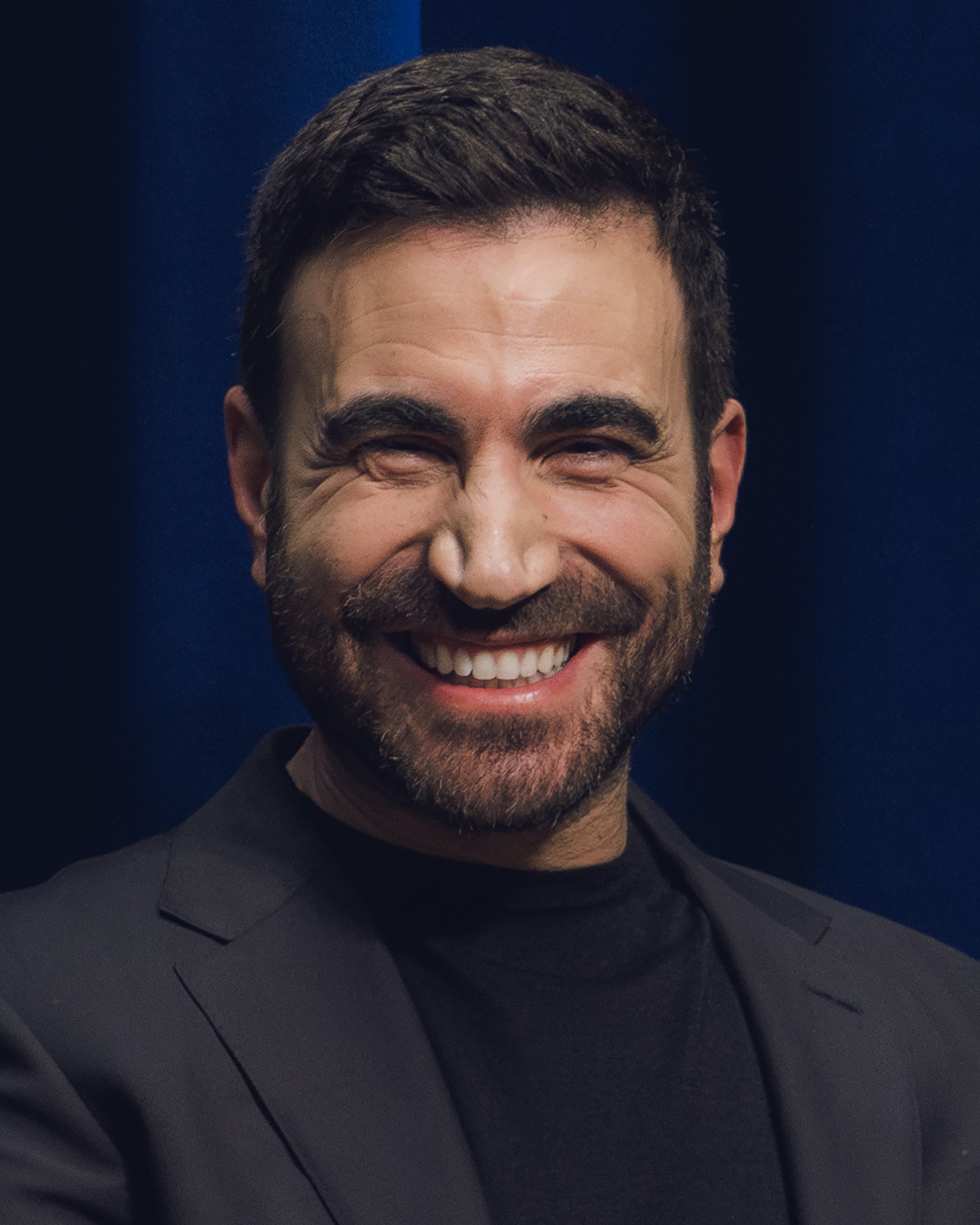
Brett Goldstein's performance in the episode was praised by critics.

"Goodbye Earl" received positive reviews from critics. Myles McNutt of The A.V. Club gave the episode a "B+" and wrote, "And in this way, 'Goodbye Earl' is meant to disarm us: we're presented with an overly cheery version of AFC Richmond's status quo, where everyone is happy even when the team is no closer to escaping relegation, and where none of the characters have resolved any of the inner struggles that were revealed over the course of last season. And so while Dr. Fieldstone's arrival is positioned to solve those and other struggles, her sudden arrival disrupts the honeymoon vibe the show entered by the end of last season, and creates a foundation on which the show will hopefully build a new journey for these characters worthy of their journey thus far."

Alan Sepinwall of Rolling Stone wrote, "For a while, 'Goodbye, Earl' seems to be presupposing that a comedy might not need ongoing tension. When we catch up with all our pals, Richmond is playing through the final minutes of their eighth game in the lower Championship league. They have no wins under their belt so far; but the Greyhounds also have no losses. There's a maxim attributed to various hardass American football coaches that 'a tie is like kissing your sister.' But Ted Lasso is anything but a hardass. In many ways a tie is his platonic ideal for how every game should end: Nobody has to go home completely sad about the outcome."

Keith Phipps of Vulture gave the episode a 4 star rating out of 5 and wrote, "Something about Ted Lasso struck a chord of the sort last sounded by The Good Place. It was funny, charming, and quotable, but it also had a lot on its mind beyond making easy jokes about an unassuming Yank football coach trying to figure out how to coach an English soccer team despite having no experience with the sport. Ted Lasso humbly asked some big questions and strived to be a show about what it means to be a good person. It did so without resorting to easy lessons or simple moralizing, and in Ted it found an avatar of goodness who was both unmistakably, goofily human and a man of unexpected complexity." Becca Newton of TV Fanatic gave the episode a 4 star rating out of 5 and wrote, "Ted Lasso is back, but is it better than ever? The answer is yes - thousand times yes. 'Goodbye Earl' wastes no time getting the audience back into the action and improving on what came before."

Linda Holmes of NPR wrote, "In a strong season premiere, Ted Lasso survives a risky opening scene and opens a new line of inquiry: What about the problems a miracle coach doesn't know how to fix?" Christopher Orr of The New York Times wrote, "Last season was loaded with foils for Ted: Rebecca, of course, but also Jamie, and in their different ways, Roy, Higgins and Nate. By now, Ted has won all of them over — except Jamie, about whom I again promise more shortly — and the show needs a new source of friction. Will Ted find a way to make Sharon appreciate him? History suggests it's only a matter of time."

=== Awards and accolades ===
TVLine named Brett Goldstein as an honorable mention as the "Performer of the Week" for the week of July 24, 2021, for his performance in the episode. The site wrote, "There's something magical — nay, poetic — about the way Brett Goldstein delivers Roy Kent's filthiest lines on Ted Lasso. More specifically, the way he manages to imbue every cuss word that comes out of the former footballer's mouth with a sense of what he's feeling. Take, for instance, when he angrily conveyed to girlfriend Keeley that he didn't want to accept a job as a 'f–king football pundit' for Sky Sports ('I'd rather s–t out my own f–king mouth than do that f–king s–t!'), or when he tried his damndest to communicate to Rebecca that she deserves to be with someone who makes her feel like she's been 'struck by f–king lightning.' Roy doesn't like to wear his heart on his sleeve, but he does so unwittingly — and Goldstein is a f–king riot every time."
