= Tan Lines (Ted Lasso) =

- Ted Lasso episode
- Episode no.: Season 1 Episode 5
- Directed by: Elliot Hegarty
- Written by: Brett Goldstein
- Cinematography by: John Sorapure
- Editing by: Melissa McCoy
- Original release date: August 28, 2020
- Running time: 31 minutes

Guest appearances
- Toheeb Jimoh as Sam Obisanya; Annette Badland as Mae; Andrea Anders as Michelle Lasso

Episode chronology
← Previous "For the Children"	Next → "Two Aces"

"Tan Lines" is the fifth episode of the American sports comedy-drama television series Ted Lasso, based on the character played by Jason Sudeikis in a series of promos for NBC Sports' coverage of England's Premier League. The episode was written by main cast member Brett Goldstein and directed by Elliot Hegarty. It was released on Apple TV+ on August 28, 2020.

The series follows Ted Lasso, an American college football coach, who is unexpectedly recruited to coach a fictional English Premier League soccer team, AFC Richmond, despite having no experience coaching soccer. The team's owner, Rebecca Welton, hires Lasso hoping he will fail as a means of exacting revenge on the team's previous owner, Rupert, her unfaithful ex-husband. In the episode, Ted's wife and son visit him, with Ted hoping to rekindle his relationship with his wife. Meanwhile, Roy and Rebecca worry that Keeley is still going out with Jamie.

The episode received very positive reviews from critics, who praised Sudeikis' performance, character development, emotional tone and directing.

== Plot ==
Ted (Jason Sudeikis) is nervous as his wife, Michelle (Andrea Anders), and son Henry are visiting him. He hopes to reconnect with his wife, who recently asked for some time off in their relationship. Meanwhile, despite breaking up with Jamie (Phil Dunster), Keeley (Juno Temple) is still working with him for a promotion shoot she had organized, even though Roy (Brett Goldstein) and Rebecca (Hannah Waddingham) do not think it is a good idea.

Ted spends the day with Michelle and Henry. While alone with her, Ted sees Michelle crying. She claims that she is struggling to continue despite her worry that she might not love him anymore but wants to keep trying. Meanwhile, Jamie's attitude and his refusing to follow Ted's strategies are not helping the team. During a match, Jamie scores a goal but shows a lack of empathy when Sam gets injured, which gets him into a fight with Roy, with both receiving yellow cards.

Jamie manages to score another goal during a free kick to tie the game, and swaggers to the crowd. To teach him a lesson, Ted controversially benches Jamie for the second half, angering the public. Following a new strategy, Sam scores a goal, which ends the game with Richmond winning 3–2. The first victory of the season sends the fans into a joyful frenzy. In the aftermath, as Michelle and Henry prepare to go back to the United States, Ted tells her that he does not want her to keep trying to repair their relationship. He bids farewell to Michelle and Henry as they leave for the airport and is joined by Beard (Brendan Hunt) who brings him a beer.

== Development ==
=== Production ===
The character of Ted Lasso first appeared in 2013 as part of NBC Sports promoting their coverage of the Premier League, portrayed by Jason Sudeikis. In October 2019, Apple TV+ gave a series order to a series focused on the character, with Sudeikis reprising his role and co-writing the episode with executive producer Bill Lawrence. Sudeikis and collaborators Brendan Hunt and Joe Kelly started working on a project around 2015, which evolved further when Lawrence joined the series. The episode was directed by Elliot Hegarty and written by main cast member Brett Goldstein. This was Hegarty's first directing credit, and Goldstein's first writing credit for the show.

=== Casting ===
The series announcement confirmed that Jason Sudeikis would reprise his role as the main character. Other actors who are credited as series regulars include Hannah Waddingham, Jeremy Swift, Phil Dunster, Brett Goldstein, Brendan Hunt, Nick Mohammed, and Juno Temple.

== Critical reviews ==
"Tan Lines" received very positive reviews from critics. Gissane Sophia of Marvelous Geeks Media wrote, "In 'Tan Lines', the right person works in favor of vulnerability because the right people will never judge your moments of darkness, but the right person will understand and make the challenging moments easier to bear with. And that's what this team is. It's what this show focuses on when it gives us these metaphors to remind us of the detail that even though this is a statement about marriage, it's also a general statement about life."

Mads Lennon of FanSided wrote, "Ted's family travels over 4,000 miles to the U.K. to spend time with him in this touching episode. Ted Lasso Episode 5 is really about Ted stepping up to the plate in both his career and at home. He makes at least two monumental changes, one that drastically affects AFC Richmond, and one that will alter his home life forever." Daniel Hart of Ready Steady Cut gave the episode a 4 star rating out of 5 wrote, "The episode brings closure for the Ted who had a cloud over his head in an emotional chapter."

Christine Persaud of Collider wrote, "The fifth episode of the first season further solidifies that Ted uses his upbeat attitude to mask his sadness. Things have not improved with his wife, and they have decided to end things. It's also the first time Ted shows how he channels his feelings into work, benching Jamie to prove to the team that they are good enough to do it on their own as well."
