= Make Rebecca Great Again =

- Ted Lasso episode
- Episode no.: Season 1 Episode 7
- Directed by: Declan Lowney
- Story by: Joe Kelly; Brendan Hunt
- Teleplay by: Jason Sudeikis
- Cinematography by: David Rom
- Editing by: Melissa McCoy
- Original release date: September 11, 2020
- Running time: 32 minutes

Guest appearances
- Toheeb Jimoh as Sam Obisanya; Andrea Anders as Michelle Lasso; Ellie Taylor as Flo "Sassy" Collins

Episode chronology
← Previous "Two Aces"	Next → "The Diamond Dogs"

"Make Rebecca Great Again" is the seventh episode of the American sports comedy-drama television series Ted Lasso, based on the character played by Jason Sudeikis in a series of promos for NBC Sports' coverage of England's Premier League. The episode was written by main cast member Jason Sudeikis from a story by consulting producer Joe Kelly and main cast member Brendan Hunt, and directed by Declan Lowney. It was released on Apple TV+ on September 11, 2020.

The series follows Ted Lasso, an American college football coach, who is unexpectedly recruited to coach a fictional English Premier League soccer team, AFC Richmond, despite having no experience coaching soccer. The team's owner, Rebecca Welton, hires Lasso hoping he will fail as a means of exacting revenge on the team's previous owner, Rupert, her unfaithful ex-husband. In the episode, Richmond heads to Liverpool for a match against Everton F.C., although Ted's personal life distracts him.

The episode received extremely positive reviews from critics, who praised Jason Sudeikis' performance, mature tone, character development and writing. For his performance in the episode, Nick Mohammed was nominated for Outstanding Supporting Actor in a Comedy Series at the 73rd Primetime Emmy Awards. Additionally, the episode was nominated for Outstanding Writing for a Comedy Series and Outstanding Directing for a Comedy Series.

== Plot ==
AFC Richmond is preparing to leave for Liverpool for a match against Everton F.C., a team they have not been able to defeat in 60 years. Meanwhile, Rebecca (Hannah Waddingham) is distracted by the anniversary of her marriage, so she decides to take Keeley (Juno Temple) with her on a private jet to Liverpool.

As the team stays at the hotel, Rebecca and Keeley spend time together. They are joined by Rebecca's old friend, Flo "Sassy" Collins (Ellie Taylor), and all three go drinking. Sassy meets Ted (Jason Sudeikis) at the reception desk and takes a liking to him. Ted is anxious and distracted because he has been sent divorce papers to sign. When he finds Nate (Nick Mohammed) slipping suggestions for the team under his hotel room door, he snaps at Nate. The next morning, he apologizes to Nate, agreeing to go with his suggestions. However, he asks Nate to deliver a motivating speech to the club before the game. Nate's speech includes insulting the players, which the team actually finds funny, and motivates them to step up their performance. Richmond wins the game 1-0 thanks to a goal by Roy (Brett Goldstein), his first goal in a long time.

To celebrate, the team goes out to a karaoke bar. Rebecca sings "Let It Go", impressing the crowd. During her performance, Ted suffers a panic attack and stumbles out of the bar. Rebecca finds and consoles him, offering to take him back to the hotel, but Ted reassures her he can go alone. As the celebration ends, Roy accompanies Keeley to her hotel room, where he kisses her and then leaves. At his room, Ted finally signs the papers. He then opens the door to find Sassy, who enters his room.

== Development ==
=== Production ===
The character of Ted Lasso first appeared in 2013 as part of NBC Sports promoting their coverage of the Premier League, portrayed by Jason Sudeikis. In October 2019, Apple TV+ gave a series order to a series focused on the character, with Sudeikis reprising his role and co-writing the episode with executive producer Bill Lawrence. Sudeikis and collaborators Brendan Hunt and Joe Kelly started working on a project around 2015, which evolved further when Lawrence joined the series. The episode was directed by Declan Lowney and written by main cast member Jason Sudeikis from a story by consulting producer Joe Kelly and main cast member Brendan Hunt. This was Lowney's first directing credit, Sudeikis' third writing credit, Kelly's third writing credit, and Hunt's third writing credit for the show.

Disney initially denied permission to license "Let it Go" from the 2013 film Frozen for Rebecca's karaoke scene. However, the writers were adamant in using the song, and filmed the scene with it with the hopes of using the finished product to change Disney's minds. They did record an alternate scene of Rebecca singing Gloria Gaynor's "I Will Survive" in case the strategy did not work. After being presented the filmed scene, Disney reversed its denial and licensed the song for the episode.

=== Casting ===
The series announcement confirmed that Jason Sudeikis would reprise his role as the main character. Other actors who are credited as series regulars include Hannah Waddingham, Jeremy Swift, Phil Dunster, Brett Goldstein, Brendan Hunt, Nick Mohammed, and Juno Temple.

== Critical reviews ==
"Make Rebecca Great Again" received extremely positive reviews from critics. Gissane Sophia of Marvelous Geeks Media wrote, "Accountability matters. Kindness matters. Embracing the good, the bad, and the ugly matters. And sharing our pain matters. Ted Lasso's 'Make Rebecca Great Again' makes it clear that there's no darkness these characters can't come out of, and it's beautiful in more ways than I have words for."

Mads Lennon of FanSided wrote, "As a big fan of the Keeley/Rebecca relationship, I loved seeing them together in this episode, especially as Keeley made it obvious she has a legitimate crush on Rebecca. Watching her joke with Rebecca about wanting to have 'wicked sex' with her as she dips her toe “back in the lady pool” was hilarious. It might not be genuine confirmation, but I'm taking it as Keeley being bisexual." Daniel Hart of Ready Steady Cut gave the episode a 4 star rating out of 5 wrote, "Ted Lasso continues to impress and 'Make Rebecca Great Again' is surprisingly emotionally moving as characters come to terms with their losses."

=== Awards and accolades ===
TVLine named Jason Sudeikis the "Performer of the Week" for the week of September 12, 2020, for his performance in the episode. The site wrote, "Simmering beneath it all was Ted, nudged by many a reminder, coming to terms with his divorce. Because as good a game face as he previously put on when agreeing to 'let go' of Michelle, this week Sudeikis made it clear to us that it was in fact hurting the optimist so, so much."

Nick Mohammed submitted this episode for consideration for his Primetime Emmy Award for Outstanding Supporting Actor in a Comedy Series nomination at the 73rd Primetime Emmy Awards. He lost the award to his co-star, Brett Goldstein. The episode was also nominated for Outstanding Writing for a Comedy Series and Outstanding Directing for a Comedy Series, losing both awards to Hacks for the episode "There Is No Line".
