= Gifted Program (Abbott Elementary) =

- Abbott Elementary episode
- Episode no.: Season 1 Episode 6
- Directed by: Matt Sohn
- Written by: Jordan Temple
- Production code: T12.17156
- Original air date: February 1, 2022

Guest appearances
- William Stanford Davis as Mr. Johnson; Bruno Amato as Gary; Richard Brooks as Gerald Howard

Episode chronology
← Previous "Student Transfer"	Next → "Art Teacher"
- Abbott Elementary (season 1)

"Gifted Program" is the sixth episode of the American sitcom television series Abbott Elementary. It was written by Jordan Temple, and was directed by Matt Sohn, and the first of which not to be directed by Randall Einhorn. It premiered on the American Broadcasting Company (ABC) in the United States on February 1, 2022.

== Plot ==
After noticing that a smart new student has transferred to Abbott, Janine (Quinta Brunson) is inspired to start a "gifted program" at their school full of academically excelling students. Janine asks Jacob (Chris Perfetti) to teach. However, many of the other students not in the gifted program start to feel left out. This causes Janine to try to replicate the gifted program's lessons in her own class, only to end up accidentally releasing snakes in the school. With advice from Gregory (Tyler James Williams), Janine dismantles the gifted program in favor of creating a rotational enrichment program for all the students of the school. Meanwhile, Barbara (Sheryl Lee Ralph) encourages a stubborn Melissa (Lisa Ann Walter) into going out with the vending machine owner, Gary, who resupplies snacks in the teacher's breakroom.

== Reception ==
Upon its initial broadcast on ABC, "Gifted Program" was viewed by 2.77 million viewers, slightly less than the previous episode. This rating earned the episode a 0.58 in the 18-49 rating demographics on the Nielsen ratings scale.

The episode airs following its midseason entry in the 2021–22 television season. Filming for the sixth episode took place between August 16, and November 5, 2021, in Los Angeles, California. Like other episodes, interior scenes are filmed at Warner Bros. Studios, Burbank in Burbank, California, with exterior shots of the series being filmed in front of Vermont Elementary School in Los Angeles.
