= Student Transfer (Abbott Elementary) =

- Abbott Elementary episode
- Episode no.: Season 1 Episode 5
- Directed by: Randall Einhorn
- Written by: Brittani Nichols
- Production code: T12.17155
- Original air date: January 25, 2022

Guest appearances
- William Stanford Davis as Mr. Johnson; Lela Hoffmeister as Courtney

Episode chronology
← Previous "New Tech"	Next → "Gifted Program"
- Abbott Elementary (season 1)

"Student Transfer" is the fifth episode of the American sitcom television series Abbott Elementary. It was written by Brittani Nichols, and was directed by Randall Einhorn. It premiered on the American Broadcasting Company (ABC) in the United States on January 25, 2022. In the episode, Janine deals with a troublesome transfer student from Melissa's classroom.

== Plot ==
Janine (Quinta Brunson) grows to become upset when Melissa (Lisa Ann Walter) teases her over a review that claims she is an inexperienced teacher. A disruptive student named Courtney is transferred from Melissa's class to Janine's. In the teacher’s lounge, Janine goes to Ava (Janelle James) to ask for Courtney’s file. There she discovers that Ava and Barbara (Sheryl Lee Ralph) have an ongoing bet on her success with the Courtney situation. Janine reads Courtney’s file and finds that it had substantial information written in by Melissa. Janine is slightly miffed that Melissa didn’t give her a heads up. She attempts to use her to prove her competence but eventually consults Melissa for help when Courtney becomes disruptive to her classroom. Ultimately, the two come to the conclusion that Courtney is not challenged enough and needs to move up a grade. Meanwhile, Jacob (Chris Perfetti) has difficulty with some of his students who are "roasting" him, and seeks help from Gregory (Tyler James Williams). However, later he gets the idea to incorporate it into his lessons.

== Reception ==
Upon its initial broadcast on ABC, "Student Transfer" was viewed by 3.02 million viewers, slightly more than the previous episode. This rating earned the episode a 0.58 in the 18-49 rating demographics on the Nielson ratings scale.

The episode airs following its midseason entry in the 2021–22 television season. Filming for the fifth episode took place between August 16, and November 5, 2021, in Los Angeles, California. Like other episodes, interior scenes are filmed at Warner Bros. Studios, Burbank in Burbank, California, with exterior shots of the series being filmed in front of Vermont Elementary School in Los Angeles.
