= Art Teacher (Abbott Elementary) =

- Abbott Elementary episode
- Episode no.: Season 1 Episode 7
- Directed by: Jennifer Celotta
- Written by: Kate Peterman
- Production code: T12.17157
- Original air date: February 8, 2022

Guest appearances
- Mitra Jouhari as Sahar; Reggie Conquest as Devin

Episode chronology
← Previous "Gifted Program"	Next → "Work Family"
- Abbott Elementary (season 1)

"Art Teacher" is the seventh episode of the American sitcom television series Abbott Elementary. It was written by Kate Peterman, who also performs in the series as Tina Schwartz, and was directed by Jennifer Celotta. It premiered on the American Broadcasting Company (ABC) in the United States on February 8, 2022.

== Plot ==
When the original art teacher for Abbott retires, Janine's (Quinta Brunson) college friend Sahar steps in and is hired as the school's new volunteer art teacher. Sahar and Melissa (Lisa Ann Walter) disagree over the latter's Peter Rabbit project, and though Janine agrees with Melissa, she finds it hard to turn down Sahar's ideas, as she looked up to her during their college days. When Sahar makes an impressive art piece using the books Melissa bought, Janine finally stands up to her and defends Melissa. Disappointed in the lack of vegetables in the school lunches, Jacob (Chris Perfetti) convinces a reluctant Barbara (Sheryl Lee Ralph) that they should start a school garden despite having little experience doing so. The cafeteria workers ultimately tell them that they cannot service food that was not prepared in the school kitchen. Experienced in landscaping, a frustrated Gregory (Tyler James Williams) secretly tends to their garden to make sure it can thrive.

== Reception ==
Upon its initial broadcast on ABC, "Art Teacher" was viewed by 2.61 million viewers, slightly less than the previous episode. This rating earned the episode a 0.6 in the 18-49 rating demographics on the Nielson ratings scale.

The episode airs following its midseason entry in the 2021–22 television season. Filming for the seventh episode took place between August 16, and November 5, 2021, in Los Angeles, California. Like other episodes, interior scenes are filmed at Warner Bros. Studios, Burbank in Burbank, California, with exterior shots of the series being filmed in front of Vermont Elementary School in Los Angeles.
