= Mae Rides the Bus =

- Ted Lasso episode
- Episode no.: Season 4 Episode 9
- Directed by: Matt Lipsey
- Written by: Jack Burditt; Julia Lindon
- Cinematography by: Vanessa Whyte
- Editing by: A.J. Catoline; Melissa McCoy; Alex Szabo; Francesca Castro
- Original release date: September 30, 2026
- Running time: 43 minutes

Guest appearances
- Annette Badland as Mae Green; Shannon Hayes as Shannon; Annelise Heywood as Mady Song; Mercedes Assad as Margy El Sharif; Tracey Ullman as Zelda Southport; Grant Feely as Henry Lasso; Adam Colborne as Basil "Baz" Primrose; Kevin Garry as Paul La Fleur; Bronson Webb as Jeremy Blumenthal

Episode chronology
← Previous "Follow the Anger"	Next → "Being Alive"

"Mae Rides the Bus" is the ninth episode of the fourth season of the American sports comedy-drama television series Ted Lasso, based on the character played by Jason Sudeikis in a series of promos for NBC Sports' coverage of England's Premier League. It is the 43rd overall episode of the series and was written by showrunner Jack Burditt and Julia Lindon, and directed by Matt Lipsey. It was released on Apple TV on September 30, 2026.

The series follows Ted Lasso, an American college football coach who is unexpectedly recruited to coach a fictional English Premier League soccer team, A.F.C. Richmond, despite having no experience coaching soccer. After helping the team reach second place in the Premier League, Ted returns home to be with his young son. In the episode, Richmond is nearing the end of the season and must win against Bristol in order to get closer to the Super League, while Keeley receives shocking news.

The episode received mixed reviews from critics; while the football storyline was praised, criticism was aimed at Roy and Keeley's storyline.

== Plot ==
A few weeks later, Richmond loses against Southampton. With two games left, Richmond must win their next match in order to guarantee their chances of entering the Super League. For their next game against Bristol, Ted invites Mae to accompany them.

While doing a medical check-up, Keeley is informed that she is pregnant. She takes more tests that confirm it, but still does not inform Roy about it. She relies the information to Rebecca, but feels Roy might not want to raise the child with her. Before the match, Mae gives the team a motivating speech. During the first half, the team struggles to keep up with Bristol, losing 0-2, with Boots also hurting her hands. During break, Beard convinces Boots to use gloves, for the sake of the team.

Richmond recovers to tie the game. Shannon seals Richmond's promotion in her debut for the club with a goal. Roy surprises Keeley at her home, hoping to distract her from the game. When she demands to watch it, he decides to re-enact the game with her make-up items. Eventually, she reveals the test, and he happily celebrates with her.

The investigation into the sales of Richmond shares reveals that Zelda is responsible, and is working with her lackey Hugo to obtain a majority stake in the club. As the team celebrates, a grieving Rebecca informs Ted that Mae passed away from a heart attack during the match.

== Development ==
=== Production ===
The episode was written by showrunner Jack Burditt and Julia Lindon, and directed by Matt Lipsey. This marked Burditt's first writing credit, Lindon's first writing credit, and Lipsey's seventh directing credit.

=== Writing ===
The episode featured the death of Mae, a prominent character seen since the first season. Annette Badland reflected, "That's what happens. You're involved with folks, and they disappear. They go, and she loved her life. She made the very best of her life and really relished it. So she went, I suppose, for her, in the very best way." She further added, "although she was effervescent and loudmouthed, she was also a lioness. It took a lot to win her trust and affection, but once you did, she would protect you. So that that was noticed and appreciated. There was a connection. She wasn't simply another person on the journey. It was very specific. So Annette is very pleased that he felt that was correct."

== Critical response ==
"Mae Rides the Bus" received mixed reviews from critics. Saloni Gajjar of The A.V. Club gave the episode a "C+" and wrote, "Once again, the show resorts to its weird tendency to forego depicting major developments on screen, leaving us to fill the gaps and wish we had actually witnessed intricate moments of interaction instead of only hearing about them. When “Mae Rides The Bus” begins, roughly two-ish months have already passed since Roy and Keeley got back together. But the audience is robbed of seeing them after suffering through all the poorly executed miscommunication storylines. Instead, bam, we’re dumped straight into a curveball. Keeley, who has peed on multiple tests to confirm it, is pregnant for real. If Ted Lasso hadn’t messed up its pace as badly as it has, this would’ve been an exciting update for the pair. But as it stands now, this Big Moment lands with a thud."

Keith Phipps of Vulture gave the episode a 3 star rating out of 5 and wrote, "The fourth season's penultimate episode features a pregnancy revelation, the unmasking of a secret villain, and, in its final moments, an unexpected loss that lends an extra layer of poignancy to the episode's title. It's a major episode narratively, one filled with satisfying moments related to the journeys Ted Lasso's characters have been on all season. But it's also an uneven one, thanks largely to a cutesy bit that underscores one of this comeback season's key weaknesses." Kevin Dolak of The Hollywood Reporter wrote, "The penultimate episode of Ted Lasso's comeback season, which nearly didn't happen until its star's about-face, is a lesson in how to move a plot along, and quickly. All of the action takes place after a six-week time jump. That was a wise choice, as was foregrounding Alice and keeping Tracey Ullman's Zelda to a scenery-chewing minimum, and it deftly sets up a suitable finale for this wobbly but course-corrected season."

Eric Francisco of Esquire wrote, "The newest episode, “Mae Rides the Bus,” isn't free from more Lasso-isms, but the sudden exit of one of its longest supporting characters is disarmingly graceful and restrained. Maybe this is the Stockholm syndrome talking — I've had to tune in every week and muster enough energy to write about it since June — but Ted Lasso finally, really got me this time." Evan Davis of Decider wrote, "“Mae Rides the Bus” is as bathetic as it gets. What possible conclusions could the season come to in the finale I daren't speculate, but rest assured that no matter how bad things get, they can be wiped away with a twitch of Ted's mustache."

Christopher Orr of The New York Times wrote, "Which is all a way of saying that having Keeley be unexpectedly pregnant in the penultimate episode of a season that has never quite found its footing is such a perfect example of the Cousin Oliver Effect, it almost seems like an inside joke, a meta-commentary on the invariability of sitcom arcs over time. Like much of what's happened between and around Keeley and Roy this season, the awkward timing of this huge revelation is due partly to the show's failure to really engage with its star-crossed lovers' story line until midway through the season." Maggie Herriman of TV Fanatic gave the episode a 4.2 star rating out of 5 and wrote, "I can't decide if I'm feeling excited, vindicated, or heartbroken after Ted Lasso Season 4's penultimate episode."
