= The Diamond Dogs (Ted Lasso) =

- Ted Lasso episode
- Episode no.: Season 1 Episode 8
- Directed by: Declan Lowney
- Written by: Leann Bowen
- Cinematography by: David Rom
- Editing by: A.J. Catoline
- Original release date: September 18, 2020
- Running time: 30 minutes

Guest appearances
- Anthony Head as Rupert Mannion; Toheeb Jimoh as Sam Obisanya; Ellie Taylor as Flo "Sassy" Collins; Annette Badland as Mae

Episode chronology
← Previous "Make Rebecca Great Again"	Next → "All Apologies"

"The Diamond Dogs" is the eighth episode of the American sports comedy-drama television series Ted Lasso, based on the character played by Jason Sudeikis in a series of promos for NBC Sports' coverage of England's Premier League. The episode was written by Leann Bowen and directed by Declan Lowney. It was released on Apple TV+ on September 18, 2020.

The series follows Ted Lasso, an American college football coach, who is unexpectedly recruited to coach a fictional English Premier League soccer team, AFC Richmond, despite having no experience coaching soccer. The team's owner, Rebecca Welton, hires Lasso hoping he will fail as a means of exacting revenge on the team's previous owner, Rupert, her unfaithful ex-husband. In the episode, Ted seeks guidance after his divorce is finalized, while Keeley is unsure if Roy is really interested in a relationship.

The episode received extremely positive reviews from critics, who praised the performances, character development, writing and tone.

== Plot ==
AFC Richmond returns home after their victory, hungover from their celebration, including Ted (Jason Sudeikis) after his one-night stand with Sassy (Ellie Taylor). He expresses his concerns to Beard (Brendan Hunt), Nate (Nick Mohammed) and Higgins (Jeremy Swift).

Keeley (Juno Temple) questions Roy (Brett Goldstein) about the kiss, but he brushes it off. When Jamie (Phil Dunster) visits her, she has sex with him, which upsets Roy. Roy asks Ted about the situation, so Ted calls the "Diamond Dogs" – Beard, Nate and Higgins – for advice. They note that, as Roy was never in a relationship with Keeley, he must act mature. This prompts Roy to open up to Keeley, telling her he is interested in a date with her. As they walk to dine, a paparazzo photographs them kissing, so Roy steals his memory card.

Ted accompanies Rebecca (Hannah Waddingham) to a pub for a meeting with two minority club owners. There, they run into Rupert (Anthony Head), who reveals he just got engaged to his new girlfriend, Bex. Rupert also reveals that Bex has bought the shares of the other club co-owners, which will allow Rupert to reclaim ownership when they get married. Ted makes a bet with Rupert over a game of darts: if Rupert wins, he can control the line-ups for two games, and if Ted wins, Rupert cannot approach the owners' box. Ted easily wins the game, checking out with a big fish, sharing a story about how people have always underestimated him, indirectly criticizing Rupert for his arrogance.

Back at the office, Higgins tells Rebecca that there are 10,000 unsold seats for the last game of the season, which could be occupied by the rival team's supporters, but Rebecca is still intent in ruining the club to punish Rupert. Fed up, he quits and storms out. Then Keeley enters and tells Rebecca that – thanks to the memory card – she and Roy know that Rebecca hired the paparazzo who photographed her encounter with Ted. She tells Rebecca to tell Ted, or she will.

== Development ==
=== Production ===
The character of Ted Lasso first appeared in 2013 as part of NBC Sports promoting their coverage of the Premier League, portrayed by Jason Sudeikis. In October 2019, Apple TV+ gave a series order to a series focused on the character, with Sudeikis reprising his role and co-writing the episode with executive producer Bill Lawrence. Sudeikis and collaborators Brendan Hunt and Joe Kelly started working on a project around 2015, which evolved further when Lawrence joined the series. The episode was directed by Declan Lowney and written by Leann Bowen. This was Lowney's second directing credit, and Bowen's first writing credit for the show.

=== Casting ===
The series announcement confirmed that Jason Sudeikis would reprise his role as the main character. Other actors who are credited as series regulars include Hannah Waddingham, Jeremy Swift, Phil Dunster, Brett Goldstein, Brendan Hunt, Nick Mohammed, and Juno Temple.

== Critical reviews ==
"The Diamond Dogs" received extremely positive reviews from critics. Gissane Sophia of Marvelous Geeks Media wrote, "'The Diamond Dogs' is everything that a solid A+ episode should be, and it's the best kind of surprise this show has to offer. Its thematic focus on curiosity and conversation brings such exquisite weight to this show — it's why it's so special."

Mads Lennon of FanSided wrote, "The episode picks up in the aftermath of the Liverpool away game and all-night celebrations, everyone is nursing a hangover or dealing with the consequences of their actions. Ted struggles to figure out how he feels after his one-night stand with Sassy, Rebecca kicks the hot waiter out of her bedroom and Nate sleeps inside the bus to ensure he doesn't miss it." Daniel Hart of Ready Steady Cut gave the episode a 4 star rating out of 5 wrote, "The episode continues the good run of chapters as Ted has a stand-out moment in defence of Rebecca."
