= Work Family (Abbott Elementary) =

- Abbott Elementary episode
- Episode no.: Season 1 Episode 9
- Directed by: Jay Karas
- Written by: Justin Tan
- Production code: T12.17158
- Original air date: February 15, 2022

Guest appearances
- William Stanford Davis as Mr. Johnson; Zack Fox as Tariq Temple; Orlando Jones as Martin Eddie

Episode chronology
← Previous "Art Teacher"	Next → "Step Class"
- Abbott Elementary (season 1)

"Work Family" is the eighth episode of the American sitcom television series Abbott Elementary. It was written by Justin Tan, and was directed by Jay Karas. It premiered on the American Broadcasting Company (ABC) in the United States on February 15, 2022.

Tyler James Williams submitted this episode for his consideration due to his nomination for the Primetime Emmy Award for Outstanding Supporting Actor in a Comedy Series at the 74th Primetime Emmy Awards.

== Plot ==
Upset that Jacob (Chris Perfetti) thinks of her as just a "work friend", Janine (Quinta Brunson) tries to build better relationships with her co-workers, specifically with Jacob. Janine learns that he has a boyfriend named Zack, that she has never met. Barbara (Sheryl Lee Ralph) and Melissa (Lisa Ann Walter) help Gregory (Tyler James Williams) with his teaching methods after his class is found to be underperforming, and they loosen him up and help him appeal to the kids more effectively. Janine enlists Tariq to perform at an anti-drug program at the school. While Gregory receives a phone call from his dad, Martin, who advises Gregory that he should move on from his substitute teaching at Abbott. However, Gregory stays insistent on staying at Abbott.

== Reception ==
Upon its initial broadcast on ABC, "Work Family" was viewed by 2.31 million viewers, slightly less than the previous episode. This rating earned the episode a 0.6 in the 18-49 rating demographics on the Nielson ratings scale.

The episode airs following its midseason entry in the 2021–22 television season. Filming for the eighth episode took place between August 16, and November 5, 2021, in Los Angeles, California. Like other episodes, interior scenes are filmed at Warner Bros. Studios, Burbank in Burbank, California, with exterior shots of the series being filmed in front of Vermont Elementary School in Los Angeles.

For the episode, guest star Orlando Jones won the Outstanding Guest Actor, Comedy Series award at the Black Reel Awards of 2022.
