= Primetime Emmy Award for Outstanding Supporting Actor in a Comedy Series =

Award for supporting actor in a television comedy series

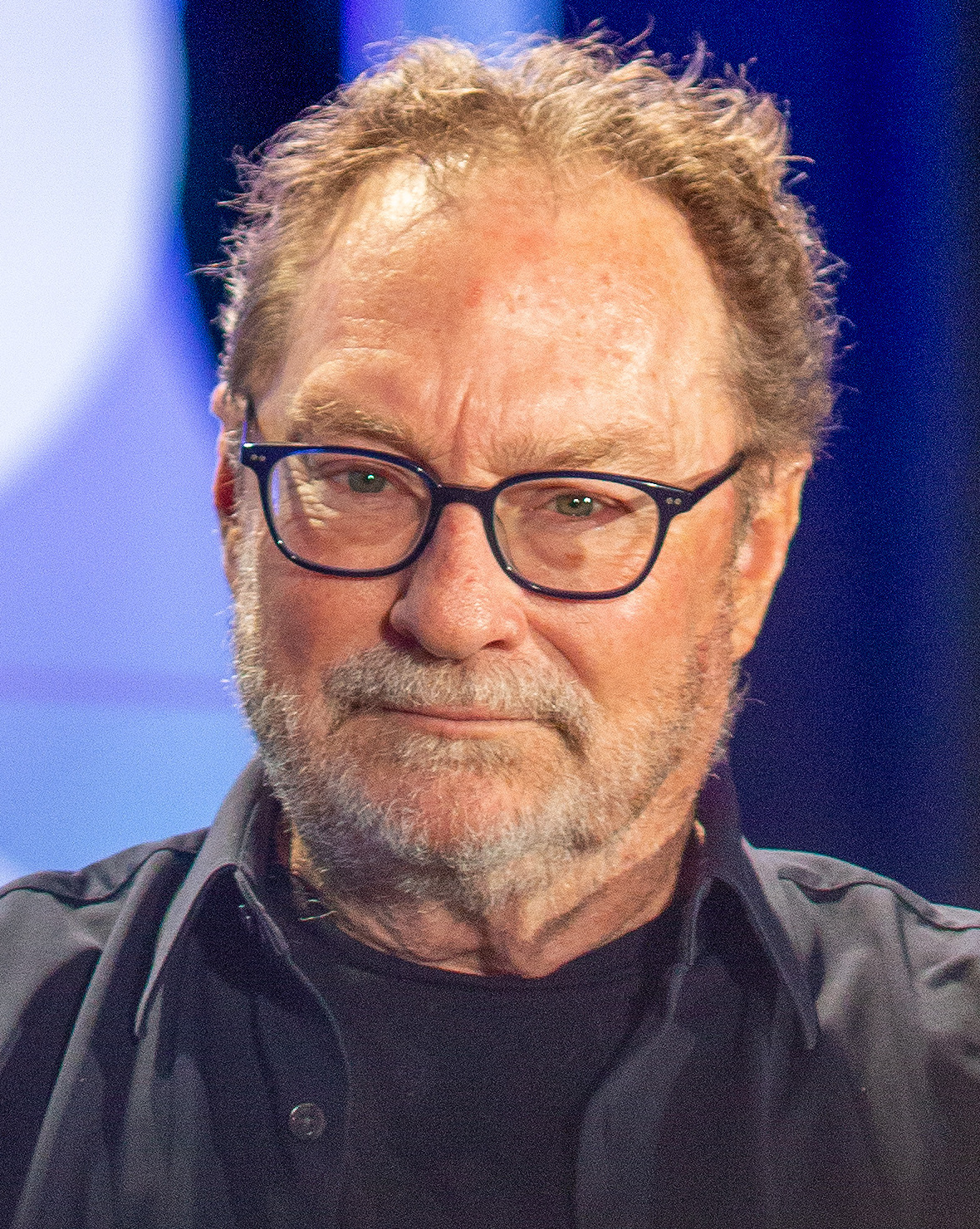
- The 2026 recipient: Stephen Root
- Awarded for: Outstanding Supporting Actor in a Comedy Series
- Country: United States
- Presented by: Academy of Television Arts & Sciences
- First award: 1954
- Currently held by: Stephen Root, Widow's Bay (2026)
- Website: emmys.com

This is a list of winners and nominees of the Primetime Emmy Award for Outstanding Supporting Actor in a Comedy Series. In early Primetime Emmy Award ceremonies, the supporting categories were not always genre, or even gender, specific. Beginning with 1970, supporting actors in comedy have competed alone. However, these comedic performances often included actors from miniseries, telefilms, and guest performers competing against main cast competitors. Such instances are marked below:

- # – Indicates a performance in a Miniseries or Television film, prior to the category's creation
- § – Indicates a performance as a guest performer, prior to the category's creation

== Winners and nominations ==
=== 1950s ===
Year	Actor	Role	Program	Network
Best Series Supporting Actor
1954 (6th) (Note: Early Emmy ceremonies did not have genre specific acting categories)
1954 (6th)	Art Carney	Various characters	The Jackie Gleason Show	CBS
1954 (6th)	Ben Alexander	Officer Frank Smith	Dragnet	NBC
1954 (6th)	William Frawley	Fred Mertz	I Love Lucy	CBS
1954 (6th)	Tony Randall	Harvey Weskitt	Mister Peepers	NBC
1954 (6th)	Carl Reiner	Various characters	Your Show of Shows	NBC
Best Supporting Actor in a Regular Series
1955 (7th)
1955 (7th)	Art Carney	Various characters	The Jackie Gleason Show	CBS
1955 (7th)	Ben Alexander	Officer Frank Smith	Dragnet	NBC
1955 (7th)	Don DeFore	Thorny	The Adventures of Ozzie & Harriet	ABC
1955 (7th)	William Frawley	Fred Mertz	I Love Lucy	CBS
1955 (7th)	Gale Gordon	Osgood Conklin	Our Miss Brooks	CBS
Best Actor in a Supporting Role
1956 (8th)
1956 (8th)	Art Carney	Ed Norton	The Honeymooners	CBS
1956 (8th)	Ed Begley #	Andy Sloane	Patterns	NBC
1956 (8th)	William Frawley	Fred Mertz	I Love Lucy	CBS
1956 (8th)	Carl Reiner	Various characters	Caesar's Hour	NBC
1956 (8th)	Cyril Ritchard #	Mr. Darling / Captain Hook	Peter Pan	NBC
Best Supporting Performance by an Actor
1957 (9th)
1957 (9th)	Carl Reiner	Various characters	Caesar's Hour	NBC
1957 (9th)	Art Carney	Various characters	The Jackie Gleason Show	CBS
1957 (9th)	Paul Ford	Col. John T. Hall	The Phil Silvers Show	CBS
1957 (9th)	William Frawley	Fred Mertz	I Love Lucy	CBS
1957 (9th)	Ed Wynn #	Army	Requiem for a Heavyweight	CBS
Best Continuing Supporting Performance by an Actor in a Dramatic or Comedy Series
1958 (10th)
1958 (10th)	Carl Reiner	Various characters	Caesar's Hour	NBC
1958 (10th)	Paul Ford	Col. John T. Hall	The Phil Silvers Show	CBS
1958 (10th)	William Frawley	Fred Mertz	I Love Lucy	CBS
1958 (10th)	Louis Nye	Various characters	The Steve Allen Show	NBC
1958 (10th)	Dennis Weaver	Chester Goode	Gunsmoke	CBS
Best Supporting Actor (Continuing Character) in a Comedy Series
1959 (11th)
1959 (11th)	Tom Poston	Various characters	The Steve Allen Show	NBC
1959 (11th)	Richard Crenna	Luke McCoy	The Real McCoys	ABC
1959 (11th)	Paul Ford	Col. John T. Hall	The Phil Silvers Show	CBS
1959 (11th)	Maurice Gosfield	Pvt. Duane Doberman	The Phil Silvers Show	CBS
1959 (11th)	Billy Gray	Bud Anderson	Father Knows Best	CBS & NBC
1959 (11th)	Harry Morgan	Pete Porter	December Bride	CBS

=== 1960s ===
Year	Actor	Role	Program	Network
Outstanding Performance by an Actor in a Series (Lead or Support)
1960 (12th)
1960 (12th)	Robert Stack	Eliot Ness	The Untouchables	ABC
1960 (12th)	Richard Boone	Paladin	Have Gun – Will Travel	CBS
1960 (12th)	Raymond Burr	Perry Mason	Perry Mason	CBS
Outstanding Performance in a Supporting Role by an Actor or Actress in a Series
1961 (13th)
1961 (13th)	Don Knotts	Barney Fife	The Andy Griffith Show	CBS
1961 (13th)	Abby Dalton	Lt. Martha Hale	Hennesey	CBS
1961 (13th)	Barbara Hale	Della Street	Perry Mason	CBS
Outstanding Performance in a Supporting Role by an Actor
1962 (14th)
1962 (14th)	Don Knotts	Barney Fife	The Andy Griffith Show	CBS
1962 (14th)	Sam Jaffe	Dr. David Zorba	Ben Casey	ABC
1962 (14th)	Barry Jones #	The Dean	Hallmark Hall of Fame	NBC
1962 (14th)	Horace McMahon	Lt. Mike Parker	Naked City	ABC
1962 (14th)	George C. Scott §	Dr. Karl Anders	Ben Casey	ABC
1963 (15th)
1963 (15th)	Don Knotts	Barney Fife	The Andy Griffith Show	CBS
1963 (15th)	Tim Conway	Ens. Charles Parker	McHale's Navy	ABC
1963 (15th)	Paul Ford #	Col. Wainwright Purdy III	Hallmark Hall of Fame	NBC
1963 (15th)	Hurd Hatfield #	Lionel de Rothschild	Hallmark Hall of Fame	NBC
1963 (15th)	Robert Redford #	George Laurents	Premiere, Presented by Fred Astaire	ABC
1964 (16th)
1964 (16th)	Albert Paulsen #	Lt. Volkoval	Bob Hope Presents the Chrysler Theatre	NBC
1964 (16th)	Sorrell Booke §	Julius Orloff	Dr. Kildare	NBC
1964 (16th)	Conlan Carter	Doc	Combat!	ABC
1964 (16th)	Carl Lee §	Lonnie Hill	The Nurses	CBS
Outstanding Individual Achievements in Entertainment - Actors and Performers
1965 (17th)
1965 (17th)	Leonard Bernstein	Conductor	New York Philharmonic Young People's Concerts with Leonard Bernstein	CBS
1965 (17th)	Lynn Fontanne	Fanny Bowditch Holmes	Hallmark Hall of Fame: "The Magnificent Yankee"	NBC
1965 (17th)	Alfred Lunt	Oliver Wendell Holmes	Hallmark Hall of Fame: "The Magnificent Yankee"	NBC
1965 (17th)	Barbra Streisand	Herself	My Name Is Barbra	CBS
1965 (17th)	Dick Van Dyke	Rob Petrie	The Dick Van Dyke Show	CBS
1965 (17th)	Julie Andrews	Herself	The Andy Williams Show	NBC
1965 (17th)	Johnny Carson	Himself	The Tonight Show Starring Johnny Carson	NBC
1965 (17th)	Gladys Cooper	Margaret St. Clair	The Rogues	NBC
1965 (17th)	Robert Coote	Timmy St. Clair	The Rogues	NBC
1965 (17th)	Richard Crenna	James Slattery	Slattery's People	CBS
1965 (17th)	Julie Harris	Florence Nightingale	Hallmark Hall of Fame: "The Holy Terror"	NBC
1965 (17th)	Bob Hope	Himself	Chrysler Presents A Bob Hope Comedy Special	NBC
1965 (17th)	Dean Jagger	Principal Albert Vane	Mr. Novak	NBC
1965 (17th)	Danny Kaye	Himself	The Danny Kaye Show	CBS
1965 (17th)	David McCallum	Illya Kuryakin	The Man from U.N.C.L.E.	NBC
1965 (17th)	Red Skelton	Himself	The Red Skelton Hour	CBS
Outstanding Performance by an Actor in a Supporting Role in a Comedy Series
1966 (18th)
1966 (18th)	Don Knotts §	Barney Fife	The Andy Griffith Show	CBS
1966 (18th)	Morey Amsterdam	Buddy Sorrell	The Dick Van Dyke Show	CBS
1966 (18th)	Frank Gorshin	Riddler	Batman	ABC
1966 (18th)	Werner Klemperer	Col. Wilhelm Klink	Hogan's Heroes	CBS
1967 (19th)
1967 (19th)	Don Knotts §	Barney Fife	The Andy Griffith Show	CBS
1967 (19th)	Gale Gordon	Mr. Theodore J. Mooney	The Lucy Show	CBS
1967 (19th)	Werner Klemperer	Col. Wilhelm Klink	Hogan's Heroes	CBS
1968 (20th)
1968 (20th)	Werner Klemperer	Col. Wilhelm Klink	Hogan's Heroes	CBS
1968 (20th)	Jack Cassidy	Oscar North	He & She	CBS
1968 (20th)	William Demarest	Uncle Charley O'Casey	My Three Sons	CBS
1968 (20th)	Gale Gordon	Mr. Theodore J. Mooney	The Lucy Show	CBS
Outstanding Continued Performance by an Actor in a Supporting Role in a Series
1969 (21st)
1969 (21st)	Werner Klemperer	Col. Wilhelm Klink	Hogan's Heroes	CBS
1969 (21st)	Greg Morris	Barney Collier	Mission: Impossible	CBS
1969 (21st)	Leonard Nimoy	Spock	Star Trek	NBC

=== 1970s ===
Year	Actor	Role	Program	Network
Outstanding Performance by an Actor in a Supporting Role in Comedy
1970 (22nd)
1970 (22nd)	Michael Constantine	Principal Seymour Kaufman	Room 222	ABC
1970 (22nd)	Werner Klemperer	Col. Wilhelm Klink	Hogan's Heroes	CBS
1970 (22nd)	Charles Nelson Reilly	Claymore Gregg	The Ghost & Mrs. Muir	ABC
1971 (23rd)
1971 (23rd)	Ed Asner	Lou Grant	The Mary Tyler Moore Show	CBS
1971 (23rd)	Michael Constantine	Principal Seymour Kaufman	Room 222	ABC
1971 (23rd)	Gale Gordon	Harrison "Uncle Harry" Carter	Here's Lucy	CBS
1972 (24th)
1972 (24th)	Ed Asner	Lou Grant	The Mary Tyler Moore Show	CBS
1972 (24th)	Ted Knight	Ted Baxter	The Mary Tyler Moore Show	CBS
1972 (24th)	Rob Reiner	Michael Stivic	All in the Family	CBS
1973 (25th)
1973 (25th)	Ted Knight	Ted Baxter	The Mary Tyler Moore Show	CBS
1973 (25th)	Ed Asner	Lou Grant	The Mary Tyler Moore Show	CBS
1973 (25th)	Gary Burghoff	Corp. "Radar" O'Reilly	M*A*S*H	CBS
1973 (25th)	Rob Reiner	Michael Stivic	All in the Family	CBS
1973 (25th)	McLean Stevenson	Lt. Col. Henry Blake	M*A*S*H	CBS
Best Supporting Actor in Comedy
1974 (26th)
1974 (26th)	Rob Reiner	Michael Stivic	All in the Family	CBS
1974 (26th)	Ed Asner	Lou Grant	The Mary Tyler Moore Show	CBS
1974 (26th)	Gary Burghoff	Corp. "Radar" O'Reilly	M*A*S*H	CBS
1974 (26th)	Ted Knight	Ted Baxter	The Mary Tyler Moore Show	CBS
1974 (26th)	McLean Stevenson	Lt. Col. Henry Blake	M*A*S*H	CBS
Outstanding Continuing Performance by a Supporting Actor in a Comedy Series
1975 (27th)
1975 (27th)	Ed Asner	Lou Grant	The Mary Tyler Moore Show	CBS
1975 (27th)	Gary Burghoff	Corp. "Radar" O'Reilly	M*A*S*H	CBS
1975 (27th)	Ted Knight	Ted Baxter	The Mary Tyler Moore Show	CBS
1975 (27th)	Rob Reiner	Michael Stivic	All in the Family	CBS
1975 (27th)	McLean Stevenson	Lt. Col. Henry Blake	M*A*S*H	CBS
1976 (28th)
1976 (28th)	Ted Knight	Ted Baxter	The Mary Tyler Moore Show	CBS
1976 (28th)	Ed Asner	Lou Grant	The Mary Tyler Moore Show	CBS
1976 (28th)	Gary Burghoff	Corp. "Radar" O'Reilly	M*A*S*H	CBS
1976 (28th)	Harry Morgan	Col. Sherman Potter	M*A*S*H	CBS
1976 (28th)	Abe Vigoda	Sgt. Philip K. Fish	Barney Miller	ABC
1977 (29th)
1977 (29th)	Gary Burghoff	Corp. "Radar" O'Reilly	M*A*S*H	CBS
1977 (29th)	Ed Asner	Lou Grant	The Mary Tyler Moore Show	CBS
1977 (29th)	Ted Knight	Ted Baxter	The Mary Tyler Moore Show	CBS
1977 (29th)	Harry Morgan	Col. Sherman Potter	M*A*S*H	CBS
1977 (29th)	Abe Vigoda	Sgt. Philip K. Fish	Barney Miller	ABC
1978 (30th)
1978 (30th)	Rob Reiner	Michael Stivic	All in the Family	CBS
1978 (30th)	Tom Bosley	Howard Cunningham	Happy Days	ABC
1978 (30th)	Gary Burghoff	Corp. "Radar" O'Reilly	M*A*S*H	CBS
1978 (30th)	Harry Morgan	Col. Sherman Potter	M*A*S*H	CBS
1978 (30th)	Vic Tayback	Mel Sharples	Alice	CBS
Outstanding Supporting Actor in a Comedy or Comedy-Variety or Music Series
1979 (31st)
1979 (31st)	Robert Guillaume	Benson DuBois	Soap	ABC
1979 (31st)	Gary Burghoff	Corp. "Radar" O'Reilly	M*A*S*H	CBS
1979 (31st)	Danny DeVito	Louie De Palma	Taxi	ABC
1979 (31st)	Max Gail	Det. Stan "Wojo" Wojciehowicz	Barney Miller	ABC
1979 (31st)	Harry Morgan	Col. Sherman Potter	M*A*S*H	CBS

=== 1980s ===
Year	Actor	Role	Program	Network
Outstanding Supporting Actor in a Comedy or Variety or Music Series
1980 (32nd)
1980 (32nd)	Harry Morgan	Col. Sherman Potter	M*A*S*H	CBS
1980 (32nd)	Mike Farrell	Cap. BJ Hunnicutt	M*A*S*H	CBS
1980 (32nd)	Max Gail	Det. Stan "Wojo" Wojciehowicz	Barney Miller	ABC
1980 (32nd)	Howard Hesseman	Dr. Johnny Fever	WKRP in Cincinnati	CBS
1980 (32nd)	Steve Landesberg	Arthur P. Deitrich	Barney Miller	ABC
1981 (33rd)
1981 (33rd)	Danny DeVito	Louie De Palma	Taxi	ABC
1981 (33rd)	Howard Hesseman	Dr. Johnny Fever	WKRP in Cincinnati	CBS
1981 (33rd)	Steve Landesberg	Arthur P. Deitrich	Barney Miller	ABC
1981 (33rd)	Harry Morgan	Col. Sherman Potter	M*A*S*H	CBS
1981 (33rd)	David Ogden Stiers	Maj. Charles Emerson Winchester III	M*A*S*H	CBS
1982 (34th)
1982 (34th)	Christopher Lloyd	Reverend Jim Ignatowski	Taxi	ABC
1982 (34th)	Danny DeVito	Louie De Palma	Taxi	ABC
1982 (34th)	Ron Glass	Det. Ron Harris	Barney Miller	ABC
1982 (34th)	Steve Landesberg	Arthur P. Deitrich	Barney Miller	ABC
1982 (34th)	Harry Morgan	Col. Sherman Potter	M*A*S*H	CBS
1982 (34th)	David Ogden Stiers	Maj. Charles Emerson Winchester III	M*A*S*H	CBS
Outstanding Supporting Actor in a Comedy, Variety or Music Series
1983 (35th)
1983 (35th)	Christopher Lloyd	Reverend Jim Ignatowski	Taxi	NBC
1983 (35th)	Nicholas Colasanto	Coach Ernie Pantusso	Cheers	NBC
1983 (35th)	Danny DeVito	Louie De Palma	Taxi	NBC
1983 (35th)	Harry Morgan	Col. Sherman Potter	M*A*S*H	CBS
1983 (35th)	Eddie Murphy	Various characters	Saturday Night Live	NBC
Outstanding Supporting Actor in a Comedy Series
1984 (36th)
1984 (36th)	Pat Harrington Jr.	Dwayne Schneider	One Day at a Time	CBS
1984 (36th)	René Auberjonois	Clayton Endicott III	Benson	ABC
1984 (36th)	Nicholas Colasanto	Coach Ernie Pantusso	Cheers	NBC
1984 (36th)	Tom Poston	George Utley	Newhart	CBS
1984 (36th)	George Wendt	Norm Peterson	Cheers	NBC
1985 (37th)
1985 (37th)	John Larroquette	Dan Fielding	Night Court	NBC
1985 (37th)	Nicholas Colasanto (posthumously)	Coach Ernie Pantusso	Cheers	NBC
1985 (37th)	Michael J. Fox	Alex P. Keaton	Family Ties	NBC
1985 (37th)	John Ratzenberger	Cliff Clavin	Cheers	NBC
1985 (37th)	George Wendt	Norm Peterson	Cheers	NBC
1986 (38th)
1986 (38th)	John Larroquette	Dan Fielding	Night Court	NBC
1986 (38th)	Tom Poston	George Utley	Newhart	CBS
1986 (38th)	John Ratzenberger	Cliff Clavin	Cheers	NBC
1986 (38th)	Malcolm-Jamal Warner	Theo Huxtable	The Cosby Show	NBC
1986 (38th)	George Wendt	Norm Peterson	Cheers	NBC
1987 (39th)
1987 (39th)	John Larroquette	Dan Fielding	Night Court	NBC
1987 (39th)	Woody Harrelson	Woody Boyd	Cheers	NBC
1987 (39th)	Tom Poston	George Utley	Newhart	CBS
1987 (39th)	Peter Scolari	Michael Harris	Newhart	CBS
1987 (39th)	George Wendt	Norm Peterson	Cheers	NBC
1988 (40th)
1988 (40th)	John Larroquette	Dan Fielding	Night Court	NBC
1988 (40th)	Kelsey Grammer	Frasier Crane	Cheers	NBC
1988 (40th)	Woody Harrelson	Woody Boyd	Cheers	NBC
1988 (40th)	Peter Scolari	Michael Harris	Newhart	CBS
1988 (40th)	George Wendt	Norm Peterson	Cheers	NBC
1989 (41st)
1989 (41st)	Woody Harrelson	Woody Boyd	Cheers	NBC
1989 (41st)	Joe Regalbuto	Frank Fontana	Murphy Brown	CBS
1989 (41st)	Peter Scolari	Michael Harris	Newhart	CBS
1989 (41st)	Meshach Taylor	Anthony Bouvier	Designing Women	CBS
1989 (41st)	George Wendt	Norm Peterson	Cheers	NBC

=== 1990s ===
Year	Actor	Role	Program	Episode Submissions	Network
1990 (42nd)
1990 (42nd)	Alex Rocco	Al Floss	The Famous Teddy Z	"Pilot" + "Teddy Sells the House" + "Agent of the Year"	CBS
1990 (42nd)	Woody Harrelson	Woody Boyd	Cheers	"Woody or Won’t He" + "Fifty-Fifty Carla" + "Lover Boyd"	NBC
1990 (42nd)	Kelsey Grammer	Frasier Crane	Cheers	"The Stork Brings a Crane" + "Severe Crane Damage" + "The Ghost and Mrs. Lebec"	NBC
1990 (42nd)	Charles Kimbrough	Jim Dial	Murphy Brown	"Anchors Away" + "Roasted" + "On the Road Again"	CBS
1990 (42nd)	Jerry Van Dyke	Luther Van Dam	Coach	"If Coach Falls in the Woods" + "Coaches Conference" + "Homewreckers"	ABC
1991 (43rd)
1991 (43rd)	Jonathan Winters	Gunny Davis	Davis Rules	"Rules of the Game" + "Mission: Improbable"	CBS
1991 (43rd)	Woody Harrelson	Woody Boyd	Cheers	"Veggie Boyd" + "Woody Interrupts"	NBC
1991 (43rd)	Charles Durning	Harlan Eldridge	Evening Shade	"The Baby Show" + "Whatever Happened to Clutch Newton?"	CBS
1991 (43rd)	Michael Jeter	Herman Stiles	Evening Shade	"Sex Education" + "Chip off the Old Brick"	CBS
1991 (43rd)	Jerry Van Dyke	Luther Van Dam	Coach	"A Father and Son Reunion" + "Cabin Fever"	ABC
1992 (44th)
1992 (44th)	Michael Jeter	Herman Stiles	Evening Shade	"Herman in Charge" + "Hasta La Vista, Baby"	CBS
1992 (44th)	Jason Alexander	George Costanza	Seinfeld	"The Tape" + "The Note"	NBC
1992 (44th)	Charles Durning	Harlan Eldridge	Evening Shade	"Three Naked Men (Parts 1 & 2)	CBS
1992 (44th)	Harvey Fierstein §	Mark Newberger	Cheers	"Rebecca’s Lover…Not"	NBC
1992 (44th)	Jay Thomas §	Jerry Gold	Murphy Brown	"Uh-Oh (Parts 2 & 3)"	CBS
1992 (44th)	Jerry Van Dyke	Luther Van Dam	Coach	"Last of the Red-Hot Luthers" + "I Think I Can’t, I Think I Can’t"	ABC
1993 (45th)
1993 (45th)	Michael Richards	Cosmo Kramer	Seinfeld	"The Junior Mint" + "The Watch"	NBC
1993 (45th)	Jason Alexander	George Costanza	Seinfeld	"The Contest" + "The Outing"	NBC
1993 (45th)	Michael Jeter	Herman Stiles	Evening Shade	"Harlan Deals a Meal" + "The Really Odd Couple"	CBS
1993 (45th)	Jeffrey Tambor	Hank Kingsley	The Larry Sanders Show	"Hank’s Contract" + "Guest Host"	HBO
1993 (45th)	Rip Torn	Artie	The Larry Sanders Show	"The New Producer" + "The Spider Episode"	HBO
1994 (46th)
1994 (46th)	Michael Richards	Cosmo Kramer	Seinfeld	"The Sniffing Accountant" + "The Opposite"	NBC
1994 (46th)	Jason Alexander	George Costanza	Seinfeld	"The Opposite" + "The Hamptons"	NBC
1994 (46th)	David Hyde Pierce	Niles Crane	Frasier	"A Midwinter Night’s Dream" + "Author, Author"	NBC
1994 (46th)	Rip Torn	Artie	The Larry Sanders Show	"Larry’s Birthday" + "The List"	HBO
1994 (46th)	Jerry Van Dyke	Luther Van Dam	Coach	"Coach for a Day (Part 2)" + "Piece o’ Cake"	ABC
1995 (47th)
1995 (47th)	David Hyde Pierce	Niles Crane	Frasier	"Flour Child" + "An Affair to Forget"	NBC
1995 (47th)	Jason Alexander	George Costanza	Seinfeld	"The Race" + "The Gymnast"	NBC
1995 (47th)	Michael Richards	Cosmo Kramer	Seinfeld	"The Jimmy" + "The Fusilli Jerry"	NBC
1995 (47th)	David Schwimmer	Ross Geller	Friends	"The One with the Blackout" + "The One with the Sonogram at the End"	NBC
1995 (47th)	Rip Torn	Artie	The Larry Sanders Show	"Arthur’s Crisis" + "Like No Business, I Know"	HBO
1996 (48th)
1996 (48th)	Rip Torn	Artie	The Larry Sanders Show	"Arthur After Hours" + "The P.A."	HBO
1996 (48th)	Jason Alexander	George Costanza	Seinfeld	"The Pool Guy" + "The Invitations"	NBC
1996 (48th)	Michael Richards	Cosmo Kramer	Seinfeld	"The Pool Guy" + "The Wait-Out"	NBC
1996 (48th)	David Hyde Pierce	Niles Crane	Frasier	"The Last Time I Saw Maris" + "Moon Dance"	NBC
1996 (48th)	Jeffrey Tambor	Hank Kingsley	The Larry Sanders Show	"Hank’s New Assistant" + "Nothing Personal"	HBO
1997 (49th)
1997 (49th)	Michael Richards	Cosmo Kramer	Seinfeld	"The Chicken Roaster"	NBC
1997 (49th)	Jason Alexander	George Costanza	Seinfeld	"The Comeback"	NBC
1997 (49th)	David Hyde Pierce	Niles Crane	Frasier	"Mixed Doubles" + "Daphne Hates Sherry"	NBC
1997 (49th)	Jeffrey Tambor	Hank Kingsley	The Larry Sanders Show	—N/a	HBO
1997 (49th)	Rip Torn	Artie	The Larry Sanders Show	—N/a	HBO
1998 (50th)
1998 (50th)	David Hyde Pierce	Niles Crane	Frasier	"The Maris Counselor" + "First Date"	NBC
1998 (50th)	Jason Alexander	George Costanza	Seinfeld	"The Strike"	NBC
1998 (50th)	Phil Hartman (posthumously)	Bill McNeal	NewsRadio	—N/a	NBC
1998 (50th)	Jeffrey Tambor	Hank Kingsley	The Larry Sanders Show	—N/a	HBO
1998 (50th)	Rip Torn	Artie	The Larry Sanders Show	—N/a	HBO
1999 (51st)
1999 (51st)	David Hyde Pierce	Niles Crane	Frasier	"Merry Christmas, Mrs. Moskowitz" + "Three Valentines"	NBC
1999 (51st)	Peter Boyle	Frank Barone	Everybody Loves Raymond	"Driving Frank" + "Ping Pong"	CBS
1999 (51st)	Peter MacNicol	John Cage	Ally McBeal	—N/a	FOX
1999 (51st)	John Mahoney	Martin Crane	Frasier	"Merry Christmas, Mrs. Moskowitz" + "Our Parents, Ourselves"	NBC
1999 (51st)	David Spade	Dennis Finch	Just Shoot Me!	"Slow Donnie" + "Two Girls for Every Boy"	NBC

=== 2000s ===
Year	Actor	Role	Program	Episode Submissions	Network
2000 (52nd)
2000 (52nd)	Sean Hayes	Jack McFarland	Will & Grace	"Homo for the Holidays" + "Acting Out"	NBC
2000 (52nd)	Peter Boyle	Frank Barone	Everybody Loves Raymond	"Prodigal Son" + "Debra Makes Something Good"	CBS
2000 (52nd)	Brad Garrett	Robert Barone	Everybody Loves Raymond	"Someone’s Cranky" + "Confronting the Attacker"	CBS
2000 (52nd)	Peter MacNicol	John Cage	Ally McBeal	—N/a	Fox
2000 (52nd)	David Hyde Pierce	Niles Crane	Frasier	"Rivals" + "A Tsar is Born"	NBC
2001 (53rd)
2001 (53rd)	Peter MacNicol	John Cage	Ally McBeal	"In Search of Barry White" + "Reasons to Believe"	Fox
2001 (53rd)	Peter Boyle	Frank Barone	Everybody Loves Raymond	"Frank Paints the House" + "Wallpaper"	CBS
2001 (53rd)	Robert Downey Jr.	Larry Paul	Ally McBeal	"Sex, Lies and Second Thoughts" + "The Obstacle Course"	Fox
2001 (53rd)	Sean Hayes	Jack McFarland	Will & Grace	"Gypsies, Tramp and Weed" + "Grace 0, Jack 2000"	NBC
2001 (53rd)	David Hyde Pierce	Niles Crane	Frasier	"Daphne Returns" + "Hooping Cranes"	NBC
2002 (54th)
2002 (54th)	Brad Garrett	Robert Barone	Everybody Loves Raymond	"Raybert" + "Lucky Suit"	CBS
2002 (54th)	Peter Boyle	Frank Barone	Everybody Loves Raymond	"Frank Goes Downstairs" + "The Kicker"	CBS
2002 (54th)	Bryan Cranston	Hal	Malcolm in the Middle	"Poker" + "Monkey"	Fox
2002 (54th)	Sean Hayes	Jack McFarland	Will & Grace	"A Chorus Lie" + "Went to a Garden Potty"	NBC
2002 (54th)	David Hyde Pierce	Niles Crane	Frasier	"Room Full of Heroes" + "Deathtrap"	NBC
2003 (55th)
2003 (55th)	Brad Garrett	Robert Barone	Everybody Loves Raymond	"Just a Formality" + "Robert’s Wedding"	CBS
2003 (55th)	Peter Boyle	Frank Barone	Everybody Loves Raymond	"Grandpa Steals" + "Meeting the Parents"	CBS
2003 (55th)	Bryan Cranston	Hal	Malcolm in the Middle	"Malcolm Holds His Tongue" + "Daycare"	Fox
2003 (55th)	Sean Hayes	Jack McFarland	Will & Grace	"Bacon & Eggs" + "Sex, Losers, and Videotape"	NBC
2003 (55th)	John Mahoney	Martin Crane	Frasier	"The Devil and Dr. Phil" + "Fathers and Sons"	NBC
2003 (55th)	David Hyde Pierce	Niles Crane	Frasier	"Roe to Perdition" + "Fraternal Schwins"	NBC
2004 (56th)
2004 (56th)	David Hyde Pierce	Niles Crane	Frasier	"No Sex Please We’re Skittish" + "Goodnight, Seattle"	NBC
2004 (56th)	Peter Boyle	Frank Barone	Everybody Loves Raymond	"Jazz Records" + "The Mentor"	CBS
2004 (56th)	Brad Garrett	Robert Barone	Everybody Loves Raymond	"The Model" + "Golf for It"	CBS
2004 (56th)	Sean Hayes	Jack McFarland	Will & Grace	"Me & Mr. Jones" + "I Never Cheered for my Father"	NBC
2004 (56th)	Jeffrey Tambor	George Bluth, Sr. and Oscar Bluth	Arrested Development	"Visiting Ours" + "Not Without My Daughter"	Fox
2005 (57th)
2005 (57th)	Brad Garrett	Robert Barone	Everybody Loves Raymond	"A Job for Robert" + "Pat’s Secret"	CBS
2005 (57th)	Peter Boyle	Frank Barone	Everybody Loves Raymond	"Boys Therapy" + "Tasteless Frank"	CBS
2005 (57th)	Sean Hayes	Jack McFarland	Will & Grace	"Queens for a Day" + "It’s a Dad, Dad, Dad, Dad World"	NBC
2005 (57th)	Jeremy Piven	Ari Gold	Entourage	"The Review" + "Busey and the Beach"	HBO
2005 (57th)	Jeffrey Tambor	George Bluth, Sr. and Oscar Bluth	Arrested Development	"Burning Love" + "Righteous Brothers"	Fox
2006 (58th)
2006 (58th)	Jeremy Piven	Ari Gold	Entourage	"The Bat Mitzvah" + "Exodus"	HBO
2006 (58th)	Will Arnett	Gob Bluth	Arrested Development	"Making a Stand" + "S.O.B.s"	Fox
2006 (58th)	Bryan Cranston	Hal	Malcolm in the Middle	"Hal Grieves" + "College Recruiters"	Fox
2006 (58th)	Jon Cryer	Alan Harper	Two and a Half Men	"Ergo, the Booty Call" + "Weekend in Bangkok"	CBS
2006 (58th)	Sean Hayes	Jack McFarland	Will & Grace	"Alive and Schticking" + "I Love L. Gay"	NBC
2007 (59th)
2007 (59th)	Jeremy Piven	Ari Gold	Entourage	"Manic Monday"	HBO
2007 (59th)	Jon Cryer	Alan Harper	Two and a Half Men	"Repeated Blows to His Unformed Head"	CBS
2007 (59th)	Kevin Dillon	Johnny "Drama" Chase	Entourage	"The Resurrection"	HBO
2007 (59th)	Neil Patrick Harris	Barney Stinson	How I Met Your Mother	"Showdown"	CBS
2007 (59th)	Rainn Wilson	Dwight Schrute	The Office	"The Coup"	NBC
2008 (60th)
2008 (60th)	Jeremy Piven	Ari Gold	Entourage	"The Day Fuckers"	HBO
2008 (60th)	Jon Cryer	Alan Harper	Two and a Half Men	"Meander to Your Dander"	CBS
2008 (60th)	Kevin Dillon	Johnny "Drama" Chase	Entourage	"The Dream Team"	HBO
2008 (60th)	Neil Patrick Harris	Barney Stinson	How I Met Your Mother	"The Goat"	CBS
2008 (60th)	Rainn Wilson	Dwight Schrute	The Office	"Money"	NBC
2009 (61st)
2009 (61st)	Jon Cryer	Alan Harper	Two and a Half Men	"Sir Lancelot’s Litterbox"	CBS
2009 (61st)	Kevin Dillon	Johnny "Drama" Chase	Entourage	"Tree Trippers"	HBO
2009 (61st)	Neil Patrick Harris	Barney Stinson	How I Met Your Mother	"Benefits"	CBS
2009 (61st)	Jack McBrayer	Kenneth Parcell	30 Rock	"The Bubble"	NBC
2009 (61st)	Tracy Morgan	Tracy Jordan	30 Rock	"The Funcooker"	NBC
2009 (61st)	Rainn Wilson	Dwight Schrute	The Office	"Heavy Competition"	NBC

=== 2010s ===
Year	Actor	Role	Program	Episode Submissions	Network
2010 (62nd)
2010 (62nd)	Eric Stonestreet	Cameron Tucker	Modern Family	"Fizbo"	ABC
2010 (62nd)	Ty Burrell	Phil Dunphy	Modern Family	"Up All Night"	ABC
2010 (62nd)	Chris Colfer	Kurt Hummel	Glee	"Laryngitis"	Fox
2010 (62nd)	Jon Cryer	Alan Harper	Two and a Half Men	"Captain Terry's Spray-On Hair"	CBS
2010 (62nd)	Jesse Tyler Ferguson	Mitchell Pritchett	Modern Family	"Family Portrait"	ABC
2010 (62nd)	Neil Patrick Harris	Barney Stinson	How I Met Your Mother	"Girls Versus Suits"	CBS
2011 (63rd)
2011 (63rd)	Ty Burrell	Phil Dunphy	Modern Family	"Good Cop Bad Dog"	ABC
2011 (63rd)	Chris Colfer	Kurt Hummel	Glee	"Grilled Cheesus"	Fox
2011 (63rd)	Jon Cryer	Alan Harper	Two and a Half Men	"The Immortal Mr. Billy Joel"	CBS
2011 (63rd)	Jesse Tyler Ferguson	Mitchell Pritchett	Modern Family	"Halloween"	ABC
2011 (63rd)	Ed O'Neill	Jay Pritchett	Modern Family	"The Kiss"	ABC
2011 (63rd)	Eric Stonestreet	Cameron Tucker	Modern Family	"Mother's Day"	ABC
2012 (64th)
2012 (64th)	Eric Stonestreet	Cameron Tucker	Modern Family	"Treehouse"	ABC
2012 (64th)	Ty Burrell	Phil Dunphy	Modern Family	"Lifetime Supply"	ABC
2012 (64th)	Jesse Tyler Ferguson	Mitchell Pritchett	Modern Family	"Leap Day"	ABC
2012 (64th)	Max Greenfield	Schmidt	New Girl	"Control"	Fox
2012 (64th)	Bill Hader	Various characters	Saturday Night Live	"Host: Katy Perry"	NBC
2012 (64th)	Ed O'Neill	Jay Pritchett	Modern Family	"Baby on Board"	ABC
2013 (65th)
2013 (65th)	Tony Hale	Gary Walsh	Veep	"Running"	HBO
2013 (65th)	Ty Burrell	Phil Dunphy	Modern Family	"Mistery Date"	ABC
2013 (65th)	Adam Driver	Adam Sackler	Girls	"It's Back"	HBO
2013 (65th)	Jesse Tyler Ferguson	Mitchell Pritchett	Modern Family	"The Wow Factor"	ABC
2013 (65th)	Bill Hader	Various characters	Saturday Night Live	"Host: Seth MacFarlane"	NBC
2013 (65th)	Ed O'Neill	Jay Pritchett	Modern Family	"Bringing Up Baby"	ABC
2014 (66th)
2014 (66th)	Ty Burrell	Phil Dunphy	Modern Family	"Spring-a-Ding-Fling"	ABC
2014 (66th)	Fred Armisen	Various characters	Portlandia	"Pull-Out King"	IFC
2014 (66th)	Andre Braugher	Captain Ray Holt	Brooklyn Nine-Nine	"Christmas"	Fox
2014 (66th)	Adam Driver	Adam Sackler	Girls	"Two Plane Rides"	HBO
2014 (66th)	Jesse Tyler Ferguson	Mitchell Pritchett	Modern Family	"Message Received"	ABC
2014 (66th)	Tony Hale	Gary Walsh	Veep	"Crate"	HBO
2015 (67th)
2015 (67th)	Tony Hale	Gary Walsh	Veep	"East Wing"	HBO
2015 (67th)	Andre Braugher	Captain Ray Holt	Brooklyn Nine-Nine	"The Mole"	Fox
2015 (67th)	Tituss Burgess	Titus Andromedon	Unbreakable Kimmy Schmidt	"Kimmy Goes to School!"	Netflix
2015 (67th)	Ty Burrell	Phil Dunphy	Modern Family	"Crying Out Loud"	ABC
2015 (67th)	Adam Driver	Adam Sackler	Girls	"Close-Up"	HBO
2015 (67th)	Keegan-Michael Key	Various characters	Key & Peele	"Sex Detective"	Comedy Central
2016 (68th)
2016 (68th)	Louie Anderson	Christine Baskets	Baskets	"Easter in Bakersfield"	FX
2016 (68th)	Andre Braugher	Captain Ray Holt	Brooklyn Nine-Nine	"The Oolong Slayer"	Fox
2016 (68th)	Tituss Burgess	Titus Andromedon	Unbreakable Kimmy Schmidt	"Kimmy Gives Up!"	Netflix
2016 (68th)	Ty Burrell	Phil Dunphy	Modern Family	"The Party"	ABC
2016 (68th)	Tony Hale	Gary Walsh	Veep	"Inauguration"	HBO
2016 (68th)	Keegan-Michael Key	Various characters	Key & Peele	"Y'all Ready for This?"	Comedy Central
2016 (68th)	Matt Walsh	Mike McLintock	Veep	"Kissing Your Sister"	HBO
2017 (69th)
2017 (69th)	Alec Baldwin	Donald Trump	Saturday Night Live	"Host: Melissa McCarthy"	NBC
2017 (69th)	Louie Anderson	Christine Baskets	Baskets	"Denver"	FX
2017 (69th)	Tituss Burgess	Titus Andromedon	Unbreakable Kimmy Schmidt	"Kimmy's Roommate Lemonades!"	Netflix
2017 (69th)	Ty Burrell	Phil Dunphy	Modern Family	"Grab It"	ABC
2017 (69th)	Tony Hale	Gary Walsh	Veep	"Judge"	HBO
2017 (69th)	Matt Walsh	Mike McLintock	Veep	"Chicklet"	HBO
2018 (70th)
2018 (70th)	Henry Winkler	Gene Cousineau	Barry	"Chapter Four: Commit... to YOU"	HBO
2018 (70th)	Louie Anderson	Christine Baskets	Baskets	"Thanksgiving"	FX
2018 (70th)	Alec Baldwin	Donald Trump	Saturday Night Live	"Host: Donald Glover"	NBC
2018 (70th)	Tituss Burgess	Titus Andromedon	Unbreakable Kimmy Schmidt	"Kimmy and the Beest!"	Netflix
2018 (70th)	Brian Tyree Henry	Alfred "Paper Boi" Miles	Atlanta	"Woods"	FX
2018 (70th)	Tony Shalhoub	Abe Weissman	The Marvelous Mrs. Maisel	"Thank You and Good Night"	Amazon
2018 (70th)	Kenan Thompson	Various characters	Saturday Night Live	"Host: John Mulaney"	NBC
2019 (71st)
2019 (71st)	Tony Shalhoub	Abe Weissman	The Marvelous Mrs. Maisel	"We're Going to the Catskills!"	Amazon
2019 (71st)	Alan Arkin	Norman Newlander	The Kominsky Method	"Chapter Two: An Agent Grieves"	Netflix
2019 (71st)	Anthony Carrigan	NoHo Hank	Barry	"Past = Present x Future Over Yesterday"	HBO
2019 (71st)	Tony Hale	Gary Walsh	Veep	"Veep"	HBO
2019 (71st)	Stephen Root	Monroe Fuches	Barry	"berkman > block"	HBO
2019 (71st)	Henry Winkler	Gene Cousineau	Barry	"What?!"	HBO

=== 2020s ===
Year	Actor	Role	Program	Episode Submissions	Network
2020 (72nd)
2020 (72nd)	Dan Levy	David Rose	Schitt's Creek	"Happy Ending"	Pop TV
2020 (72nd)	Mahershala Ali	Sheikh Ali Malik	Ramy	"Little Omar"	Hulu
2020 (72nd)	Alan Arkin	Norman Newlander	The Kominsky Method	"Chapter 14. A Secret Leaks, a Teacher Speaks"	Netflix
2020 (72nd)	Andre Braugher	Captain Ray Holt	Brooklyn Nine-Nine	"Ransom"	NBC
2020 (72nd)	Sterling K. Brown	Reggie	The Marvelous Mrs. Maisel	"Panty Pose"	Amazon
2020 (72nd)	William Jackson Harper	Chidi Anagonye	The Good Place	"Whenever You're Ready"	NBC
2020 (72nd)	Tony Shalhoub	Abe Weissman	The Marvelous Mrs. Maisel	"Marvelous Radio"	Amazon
2020 (72nd)	Kenan Thompson	Various characters	Saturday Night Live	"At Home #2"	NBC
2021 (73rd)
2021 (73rd)	Brett Goldstein	Roy Kent	Ted Lasso	"All Apologies"	Apple TV+
2021 (73rd)	Carl Clemons-Hopkins	Marcus Vaughn	Hacks	"New Eyes"	HBO Max
2021 (73rd)	Brendan Hunt	Coach Beard	Ted Lasso	"Two Aces"	Apple TV+
2021 (73rd)	Nick Mohammed	Nathan Shelley	Ted Lasso	"Make Rebecca Great Again"	Apple TV+
2021 (73rd)	Paul Reiser	Martin Schneider	The Kominsky Method	"Chapter 18. You only give me your funny paper"	Netflix
2021 (73rd)	Jeremy Swift	Leslie Higgins	Ted Lasso	"Biscuits"	Apple TV+
2021 (73rd)	Kenan Thompson	Various characters	Saturday Night Live	"Host: Dave Chappelle"	NBC
2021 (73rd)	Bowen Yang	Various characters	Saturday Night Live	"Host: Carey Mulligan"	NBC
2022 (74th)
2022 (74th)	Brett Goldstein	Roy Kent	Ted Lasso	"Rainbow"	Apple TV+
2022 (74th)	Anthony Carrigan	NoHo Hank	Barry	"forgiving jeff"	HBO
2022 (74th)	Toheeb Jimoh	Sam Obisanya	Ted Lasso	"Do the Right-est Thing"	Apple TV+
2022 (74th)	Nick Mohammed	Nathan Shelley	Ted Lasso	"Inverting the Pyramid of Success"	Apple TV+
2022 (74th)	Tony Shalhoub	Abe Weissman	The Marvelous Mrs. Maisel	"Everything Is Bellmore"	Prime Video
2022 (74th)	Tyler James Williams	Gregory Eddie	Abbott Elementary	"Work Family"	ABC
2022 (74th)	Henry Winkler	Gene Cousineau	Barry	"starting now"	HBO
2022 (74th)	Bowen Yang	Various characters	Saturday Night Live	"Host: Rami Malek"	NBC
2023 (75th)
2023 (75th)	Ebon Moss-Bachrach	Richard "Richie" Jerimovich	The Bear	"Ceres"	FX
2023 (75th)	Anthony Carrigan	NoHo Hank	Barry	"it takes a psycho"	HBO
2023 (75th)	Phil Dunster	Jamie Tartt	Ted Lasso	"Mom City"	Apple TV+
2023 (75th)	Brett Goldstein	Roy Kent	Ted Lasso	"La Locker Room Aux Folles"	Apple TV+
2023 (75th)	James Marsden	Himself	Jury Duty	"Ineffective Assistance"	Amazon Freevee
2023 (75th)	Tyler James Williams	Gregory Eddie	Abbott Elementary	"Educator of the Year"	ABC
2023 (75th)	Henry Winkler	Gene Cousineau	Barry	"bestest place on the earth"	HBO
2024 (76th)
2024 (76th)	Ebon Moss-Bachrach	Richard "Richie" Jerimovich	The Bear	"Forks"	FX
2024 (76th)	Lionel Boyce	Marcus Brooks	The Bear	"Honeydew"	FX
2024 (76th)	Paul W. Downs	Jimmy LuSaque, Jr.	Hacks	"Bulletproof"	Max
2024 (76th)	Paul Rudd	Ben Glenroy	Only Murders in the Building	"Thirty"	Hulu
2024 (76th)	Tyler James Williams	Gregory Eddie	Abbott Elementary	"Double Date"	ABC
2024 (76th)	Bowen Yang	Various characters	Saturday Night Live	"Host: Emma Stone"	NBC
2025 (77th)
2025 (77th)	Jeff Hiller	Joel	Somebody Somewhere	"As Much as I Like Not Feeling"	HBO
2025 (77th)	Ike Barinholtz	Sal Saperstein	The Studio	"The War"	Apple TV+
2025 (77th)	Colman Domingo	Danny	The Four Seasons	"Eco Resort"	Netflix
2025 (77th)	Harrison Ford	Dr. Paul Rhoades	Shrinking	"The Last Thanksgiving"	Apple TV+
2025 (77th)	Ebon Moss-Bachrach	Richard "Richie" Jerimovich	The Bear	"Doors"	FX
2025 (77th)	Michael Urie	Brian Lorenzo	Shrinking	"Full Grown Dude Face"	Apple TV+
2025 (77th)	Bowen Yang	Various characters	Saturday Night Live	"Host: Jean Smart"	NBC
2026 (78th)
2026 (78th)	Stephen Root	Wyck Crawford	Widow's Bay	"Seasickness"	Apple TV
2026 (78th)	Colman Domingo	Danny	The Four Seasons	"Big Thanksgiving"	Netflix
2026 (78th)	Paul W. Downs	Jimmy LuSaque, Jr.	Hacks	"QuikScribbl"	HBO Max
2026 (78th)	Harrison Ford	Dr. Paul Rhoades	Shrinking	"And That's Our Time"	Apple TV
2026 (78th)	Nick Offerman	James "Jinx" Millet	Margo's Got Money Troubles	"Lariat Takedown"	Apple TV
2026 (78th)	Michael Urie	Brian Lorenzo	Shrinking	"D-Day"	Apple TV
2026 (78th)	Tyler James Williams	Gregory Eddie	Abbott Elementary	"Trip"	ABC

== Superlatives ==
Superlative	Outstanding Supporting Actor in a Comedy Series
Actor with most awards	Don Knotts (5)
Actor with most nominations	David Hyde Pierce (11)
Actor with most nominations without ever winning	Jason Alexander, Peter Boyle (7)
Television program with most wins	The Andy Griffith Show, The Mary Tyler Moore Show (5)
Television program with most nominations	M*A*S*H (21)

== Programs with multiple wins ==
5 wins

- The Andy Griffith Show (3 consecutive), (2 consecutive)
- The Mary Tyler Moore Show (3 consecutive), (2 consecutive)

4 wins

- Frasier (2 consecutive)
- Modern Family (3 consecutive)
- Night Court (consecutive)

3 wins

- Entourage (consecutive)
- Everybody Loves Raymond (2 consecutive)
- Taxi (consecutive)
- Seinfeld (2 consecutive)

2 wins

- All in the Family
- The Bear (consecutive)
- Caesar's Hour (consecutive)
- Hogan's Heroes (consecutive)
- The Jackie Gleason Show (consecutive)
- M*A*S*H
- Ted Lasso (consecutive)
- Veep

== Programs with multiple nominations ==
21 nominations

- M*A*S*H

19 nominations

- Cheers
- Modern Family

13 nominations

- Frasier
- The Mary Tyler Moore Show

12 nominations

- Everybody Loves Raymond
- Saturday Night Live
- Seinfeld

10 nominations

- The Larry Sanders Show

9 nominations

- Ted Lasso

8 nominations

- Barney Miller
- Barry
- Veep

7 nominations

- Entourage
- Will & Grace

6 nominations

- Newhart
- Taxi
- Two and a Half Men

5 nominations

- The Andy Griffith Show
- All in the Family
- Evening Shade
- Hogan's Heroes
- I Love Lucy
- The Marvelous Mrs. Maisel

4 nominations

- Abbott Elementary
- Ally McBeal
- The Bear
- Brooklyn Nine-Nine
- Coach
- How I Met Your Mother
- Night Court
- The Phil Silvers Show
- Shrinking
- Unbreakable Kimmy Schmidt

3 nominations

- Arrested Development
- Baskets
- Caesar's Hour
- Girls
- Hacks
- The Jackie Gleason Show
- The Kominsky Method
- Malcolm in the Middle
- Murphy Brown
- The Office

2 nominations

- 30 Rock
- Ben Casey
- Dragnet
- The Four Seasons
- Glee
- Key & Peele
- The Lucy Show
- Room 222
- The Steve Allen Show
- WKRP in Cincinnati

== Performers with multiple wins ==
5 wins

- Don Knotts (3 consecutive, then 2 consecutive)

4 wins

- John Larroquette (consecutive)
- David Hyde Pierce (2 consecutive)

3 wins

- Ed Asner (2 consecutive)
- Art Carney (consecutive)
- Brad Garrett (2 consecutive)
- Jeremy Piven (consecutive)
- Michael Richards (2 consecutive)

2 wins

- Ty Burrell
- Brett Goldstein (consecutive)
- Tony Hale
- Werner Klemperer (consecutive)
- Ted Knight
- Christopher Lloyd (consecutive)
- Ebon Moss-Bachrach (consecutive)
- Carl Reiner (consecutive)
- Rob Reiner
- Eric Stonestreet

== Performers with multiple nominations ==
11 nominations

- David Hyde Pierce

9 nominations

- Harry Morgan

8 nominations

- Ty Burrell

7 nominations

- Jason Alexander
- Ed Asner
- Peter Boyle
- Gary Burghoff
- Sean Hayes

6 nominations

- Jon Cryer
- Tony Hale
- Ted Knight
- Jeffrey Tambor
- Rip Torn
- George Wendt

5 nominations

- Jesse Tyler Ferguson
- William Frawley
- Brad Garrett
- Woody Harrelson
- Werner Klemperer
- Don Knotts
- Rob Reiner
- Michael Richards

4 nominations

- Andre Braugher
- Tituss Burgess
- Art Carney
- Danny DeVito
- Paul Ford
- Gale Gordon
- Neil Patrick Harris
- John Larroquette
- Jeremy Piven
- Tom Poston
- Carl Reiner
- Tony Shalhoub
- Jerry Van Dyke
- Tyler James Williams
- Henry Winkler
- Bowen Yang

3 nominations

- Louie Anderson
- Anthony Carrigan
- Nicholas Colasanto
- Bryan Cranston
- Kevin Dillon
- Adam Driver
- Brett Goldstein
- Michael Jeter
- Steve Landesberg
- Peter MacNicol
- Ebon Moss-Bachrach
- Ed O'Neill
- Peter Scolari
- McLean Stevenson
- Eric Stonestreet
- Kenan Thompson
- Rainn Wilson

2 nominations

- Alan Arkin
- Alec Baldwin
- Chris Colfer
- Michael Constantine
- Colman Domingo
- Paul W. Downs
- Charles Durning
- Harrison Ford
- Max Gail
- Kelsey Grammer
- Bill Hader
- Howard Hesseman
- Keegan-Michael Key
- Christopher Lloyd
- John Mahoney
- Nick Mohammed
- John Ratzenberger
- Stephen Root
- David Ogden Stiers
- Michael Urie
- Abe Vigoda
- Matt Walsh

== See also ==
- Primetime Emmy Award for Outstanding Lead Actor in a Comedy Series
- Primetime Emmy Award for Outstanding Lead Actress in a Comedy Series
- Primetime Emmy Award for Outstanding Supporting Actress in a Comedy Series
- Primetime Emmy Award for Outstanding Lead Actor in a Drama Series
- Primetime Emmy Award for Outstanding Lead Actress in a Drama Series
- Primetime Emmy Award for Outstanding Supporting Actor in a Drama Series
- Primetime Emmy Award for Outstanding Supporting Actress in a Drama Series
- Primetime Emmy Award for Outstanding Lead Actor in a Limited or Anthology Series or Movie
- Primetime Emmy Award for Outstanding Lead Actress in a Limited or Anthology Series or Movie
- Primetime Emmy Award for Outstanding Supporting Actor in a Limited or Anthology Series or Movie
- Primetime Emmy Award for Outstanding Supporting Actress in a Limited or Anthology Series or Movie
- Golden Globe Award for Best Supporting Actor – Series, Miniseries or Television Film
