= Being Alive (Ted Lasso) =

- Ted Lasso episode
- Episode no.: Season 4 Episode 10
- Directed by: Matt Lipsey
- Written by: Brendan Hunt; Jason Sudeikis
- Cinematography by: Vanessa Whyte
- Editing by: Melissa McCoy
- Original release date: October 7, 2026
- Running time: 55 minutes

Guest appearances
- Annette Badland as Mae Green; Tracey Ullman as Zelda Southport; Mercedes Assad as Margy El Sharif; Annelise Heywood as Mady Song; Shannon Hayes as Shannon; Matteo van der Grijn as Matthijs; Andrea Anders as Michelle Keller; Grant Feely as Henry Lasso; Phoebe Walsh as Jane Payne; Adam Colborne as Basil "Baz" Primrose; Kevin Garry as Paul La Fleur; Bronson Webb as Jeremy Blumenthal; Katy Wix as Barbara

Episode chronology
← Previous "Mae Rides the Bus"	Next → —

"Being Alive" is the tenth episode and season finale of the fourth season of the American sports comedy-drama television series Ted Lasso, based on the character played by Jason Sudeikis in a series of promos for NBC Sports' coverage of England's Premier League. It is the 44th overall episode of the series and was written by co-creators and main cast members Brendan Hunt and Jason Sudeikis, and directed by Matt Lipsey. It was released on Apple TV on October 7, 2026.

The series follows Ted Lasso, an American college football coach who is unexpectedly recruited to coach a fictional English Premier League soccer team, A.F.C. Richmond, despite having no experience coaching soccer. After helping the team reach second place in the Premier League, Ted returns home to be with his young son. In the episode, the team prepares for the last game of the season, while Rebecca discovers Zelda's real plan.

The episode received mixed reviews from critics; while critics praised the emotional tone and performances, some were divided over the writing, characterization and pacing.

== Plot ==
At the Crown and Anchor, the team and patrons mourn Mae. After the team sings along to pay tribute, Henry leaves the bar. He confides in Ted that he is very affected by her death, and asks about Ted's father's death. Ted does not disclose it. During this, Roy is approached over becoming the new head coach of Chelsea F.C., causing him to vomit. He consults with Ted, Beard and Higgins over his parental fears, with Beard affirming that his feelings are actually very common for other parents.

The women's team prepares for their final game of the season, after winning promotion to the Women's Super League. The Lady Greyhounds play in front of a sell-out crowd at Nelson Road, including Nate, Sam and Dani. Subsequently, at the Richmond Bi-Annual Shareholders' Meeting, Zelda informs Rebecca and Higgins that she bought out all other shareholders and now controls the club. Zelda reveals her lackey Hugo met with every single shareholder to buy their stake. She states that while the female team won't be affected, she wants to gain access to the male club owners by making her way to the Premier League. However, Rebecca and Higgins were already aware of this, and Hugo conspired with them to get 49% of the shares. Rebecca also reveals that Mae bequeathed her 2% in her will to Rebecca, making her the majority owner. The will also reveals that she left the pub to Baz, Jeremy, and Paul, who are ecstatic. Despite her betrayal, Rebecca forgives her and looks forward to seeing her in the next meeting.

After talking with Beard, Ted finally decides to tell Henry the truth about his father's death. Roy informs Rebecca and Ted that he has accepted the Chelsea offer, and both congratulate him. Inspired by recent events, Rebecca asks Matthijs to marry her, which he accepts. Ted also informs Alice that he is stepping down to become assistant coach, promoting her to head coach, which will help him spend more time with Henry.

== Development ==
=== Production ===
The episode was written by co-creators and main cast members Brendan Hunt and Jason Sudeikis, and directed by Matt Lipsey. This marked Hunt's ninth writing credit, Sudeikis' ninth writing credit, and Lipsey's eighth directing credit.

=== Writing ===
Brendan Hunt explained Ted's decision to promote Alice to coach, "I don't think Ted's elevation of Alice is based at all on any failings on his part. He just sees her readiness. He sees that she has grown, and because she has put work into growing and she's been willing to grow, he is ready to find a way to have more time in his life to connect with his son and with himself, really. The timing is right." He further added, "I'm certainly interested in finding out like, is this a bit pie in the sky for Ted to think he can just shift down to backseat and have someone telling him what to do and where to be and making demands of him? We'll see how how he adjusted that. It might not be as easy as he thinks." According to Hunt, Jason Sudeikis himself pitched the ending, deeming it "just kind of fundamental to what the season was going to be."

Hunt also said that Roy's closure to his storyline is due in case of cast availability, "so this does allow us to potentially have our cake and eat it too, or particularly Brett to have his cake and eat it too." He also said, "So to the degree that Roy is here as part of Keeley's life, his job is kind of immaterial to what that is. And despite what we make it look like in Episode 8, Chelsea is not that far away as long as you plan well. So have a car that isn't stupid. There's no reason to think that he's gone forever."

=== Music ===
The episode featured a cover of the show's theme song by Brandi Carlile, the second time the show has used an alternative version after Jeff Tweedy's cover in the season two episode "Beard After Hours". The theme was co-written and is usually performed by Marcus Mumford. Hunt explained that the choice to use Carlile's version fit thematically with the progression of the season, stating that, "we knew that to come out of Mae’s wake or whatever you want to call it there and go straight into [Mumford's version] would’ve been a bit abrupt," and that they had originally decided to use Tweedy's version again. Carlile and Sudekis are friends, and Hunt advised that Sudekis reached out to ask her to record a cover of the song to be used in the episode. Hunt also teased that the change may be permanent should the show be picked up for a fifth season, explaining that, "Jason has talked about for a while, that at some point the theme song should be presenting the change and what the show is now, from the men’s team to the women’s team, and we should have it being sung by a woman’s voice, but he wanted the handover to be to be graceful in some way and not just suddenly do it. I think he just saw this opportunity here and went to and went to Brandi for it." He expressed that when Sudekis invited him and his wife over to hear Carlile's rendition for the first time, he "bawled" and described it as "really, really powerful".

== Critical response ==
"Being Alive" received mixed reviews from critics. Saloni Gajjar of The A.V. Club gave the episode a "C–" and wrote, "There are a few touching moments in “Being Alive,” like Roy opening up Ted's gift of the little green statue or Alice earning her promotion while Ted voluntarily takes a demotion to assistant coach so he has more time to spend time with Henry. At the same time, Ted Lasso is no longer a coherent TV dramedy; it's a string of very few commendable moments begging for a reaction. And most often during season four, that reaction was a shrug."

Keith Phipps of Vulture gave the episode a 4 star rating out of 5 and wrote, "By season's end, it feels like Alice, Ted, and Beard, along with the team they coach, have become a winning unit in every sense — and one worth following in future seasons." Kevin Dolak of The Hollywood Reporter wrote, "Betrayal, turnabout, an inevitable departure, genuine surprises, a spot-on Roy Kent impression and cryptic clues about what's next for the Ted Lasso gang all abound in the season four finale of Apple's hit sports dramedy. Each character's fate gets either a satisfying-enough conclusion or a suitable lead-in to a yet-to-be-announced season five at AFC Richmond."

Eric Francisco of Esquire wrote, "Remember when this show was exciting? Remember when it was funny? Remember when this show had some real drama and stakes and a feeling that the floor could open up at any moment and a delicate house of cards could come crashing down? (Remember when Rebecca was the villain?) I remember when Ted Lasso was many good things. These days, I doubt I'll have a clue what show I'm tuning in to when season 5 eventually comes around." Evan Davis of Decider wrote, "The season concludes as so much of Ted Lasso concludes: back at the beginning of an ever-repeating cycle, while selling you hard on the idea that it has continued to push forward. All we can hope is that the raucous, sold-out stadium in Richmond's final match will be the team's new normal. Alice and the players deserve to be respected."

Christopher Orr of The New York Times wrote, "After the Season 3 finale, Ted Lasso felt complete. Three seasons had been the explicit plan from the start, after all. One consequence of extending the show for the fourth season is that it now feels incomplete again. A drawback? An opportunity? Time will tell." Maggie Herriman of TV Fanatic gave the episode a 4 star rating out of 5 and wrote, "Some aspects of Ted Lasso's original magic were always going to be incredibly hard to recapture, but I believe the writers achieved their goal of bridging the familiar with the new, creating an original story that stands on its own."
