= Toheeb Jimoh =

British actor

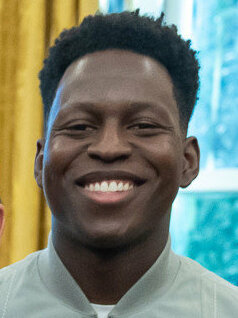
- Jimoh in 2023
- Born: Brixton, London, England
- Education: Guildhall School of Music and Drama (BA)
- Occupation: Actor
- Years active: 2015–present
- Notable work: Ted Lasso; The Power; Industry

Toheeb Jimoh is a British actor. He earned a Primetime Emmy Award nomination and won both a Screen Actors Guild Award and a Critic's Choice Breakthrough Award for his performance as Sam Obisanya in the Apple TV+ series Ted Lasso (2020–2023).

== Early life and education ==
Toheeb Jimoh was born in Brixton, London, South London, to parents of Nigerian descent. He moved to Nigeria as a toddler and returned to London when he was seven.

He attended The Norwood School before going on to train at the Guildhall School of Music and Drama, graduating in 2018.

== Career ==
Jimoh, in 2020, played Anthony Walker, the victim of a 2005 racist attack, in BBC One's Anthony, which imagines Walker's life if he had not been killed. His portrayal was called "utterly magnetic". He then portrayed Marcus in the Amazon series The Feed.

Jimoh was in a stage production of A Midsummer Night's Dream at the Sheffield Crucible and in 2020, was one of six performers in the Almeida Theatre's Christmas Play Nine Lessons and Carols, the theatre's first production post London's COVID-19 lockdown.

When Jimoh auditioned for Ted Lasso, the character of Sam Obisanya was written as Ghanaian, but his background was changed to Nigerian to match Jimoh's own. His performance has received praise, with his character called the "heartbeat" of the show.

Jimoh portrays another Nigerian character, journalist Tunde, in the Amazon thriller series The Power, based on Naomi Alderman's novel of the same name. He also has a small part in the Wes Anderson film The French Dispatch.

Jimoh played Romeo in a summer 2023 production of Romeo and Juliet at the Almeida Theatre in London.

In 2024, Jimoh played Hal in Player Kings, an adaption of Shakespeare's Henry IV part 1 and 2 by Robert Icke which also co-stars Ian McKellen and Richard Coyle.

== Filmography ==
=== Film ===
| Year | Title | Role | Notes |
|---|---|---|---|
| 2021 | The French Dispatch | Cadet 1 | |
| 2026 | Clarissa | Young Peter | |
| 2026 | Prima Facie | Johnny | |

=== Television ===
| Year | Title | Role | Notes |
|---|---|---|---|
| 2019 | London Kills | Leshae Hobbs | Episode: "The Dark" |
| 2019 | The Feed | Marcus | Recurring role, 7 episodes |
| 2020 | Anthony | Anthony Walker | BBC TV movie |
| 2020–2026 | Ted Lasso | Sam Obisanya | Recurring (S1 & 2), Main (S3), Guest (S4) |
| 2023 | The Power | Tunde Ojo | Main role |
| 2026 | Industry | Kwabena Bannerman | Recurring role |
| 2027 | Open Water | Marcus | Main role |

=== Theatre ===
| Year | Title | Role | Notes |
|---|---|---|---|
| 2023 | Romeo and Juliet | Romeo | Almeida Theatre, West End |
| 2024 | Player Kings | Hal | Manchester Opera House, Manchester. |

== Awards and nominations ==
| Year | Association | Category | Project | Result | Ref. |
|---|---|---|---|---|---|
| 2021 | Critics' Choice Television Awards | Breakthrough Award | Ted Lasso | Won | |
| 2021 | Screen Actors Guild Awards | Outstanding Performance by an Ensemble in a Comedy Series | Ted Lasso | Nominated | |
| 2022 | Primetime Emmy Awards | Outstanding Supporting Actor in a Comedy Series | Ted Lasso | Nominated | |
| 2022 | Screen Actors Guild Awards | Outstanding Performance by an Ensemble in a Comedy Series | Ted Lasso | Won | |
| 2023 | Black Reel Awards | Outstanding Supporting Performance in a Comedy Series | Ted Lasso | Nominated | |
| 2023 | Hollywood Music in Media Awards | Song – Onscreen Performance (TV Show/Limited Series) | "So Long, Farewell" (from Ted Lasso) | Nominated | |
| 2024 | Screen Actors Guild Awards | Outstanding Performance by an Ensemble in a Comedy Series | Ted Lasso | Nominated | |
| 2024 | Ian Charleson Awards | | Romeo and Juliet | 2nd | |
