= List of awards and nominations received by David Byrne =

David Byrne awards and nominations
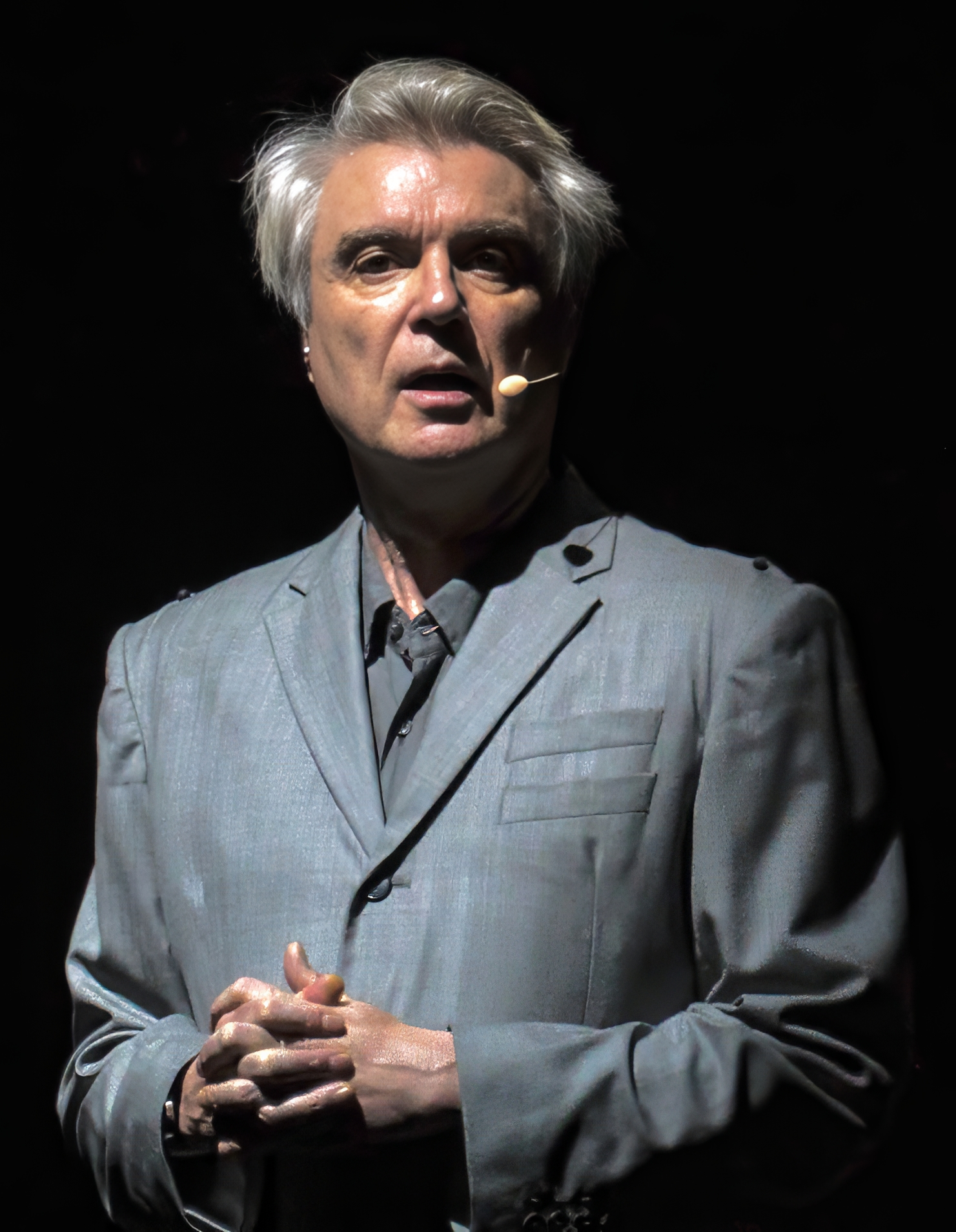
Byrne in 2018
Awards and nominations
| Award | Wins | Nominations |
Totals
| Academy Awards | 1 | 2 |
| BMI Film & TV Awards | 1 | 1 |
| British Academy Film Awards | 0 | 1 |
| Cinema Eye Honors | 1 | 1 |
| David di Donatello | 2 | 2 |
| Denver Film Critics Society | 0 | 1 |
| Drama Desk Awards | 1 | 1 |
| Golden Globe Awards | 1 | 1 |
| Grammy Awards | 1 | 7 |
| Guild of Music Supervisors Awards | 1 | 1 |
| Hollywood Music in Media Awards | 0 | 1 |
| Independent Spirit Awards | 0 | 1 |
| Los Angeles Film Critics Association | 1 | 1 |
| MTV Video Music Awards | 0 | 2 |
| North Carolina Film Critics Association | 0 | 1 |
| Primetime Emmy Awards | 0 | 1 |
| Tony Awards | 1 | 2 |
| Wins | 11 |
| Nominations | 26 |

David Byrne is an American singer, songwriter, musician, record producer, actor, writer, music theorist, visual artist, and filmmaker.

He has received an Academy Award, a Golden Globe Award, a Grammy Award, and a Special Tony Award, and he was also inducted into the Rock and Roll Hall of Fame (as part of Talking Heads).

In 2020, an honoree of the Great Immigrants Award named by Carnegie Corporation of New York

== Major awards ==
=== Academy Awards ===
| Year | Category | Nominated work | Result | Ref. |
|---|---|---|---|---|
| 1987 | Best Original Score | The Last Emperor | Won | |
| 2022 | Best Original Song | "This Is a Life" (from Everything Everywhere All at Once) | Nominated | |

=== British Academy Film Awards ===
| Year | Category | Nominated work | Result | Ref. |
|---|---|---|---|---|
| 1988 | Best Score for a Film | The Last Emperor | Nominated | |

=== Golden Globe Awards ===
| Year | Category | Nominated work | Result | Ref. |
|---|---|---|---|---|
| 1987 | Best Original Score | The Last Emperor | Won | |

=== Grammy Awards ===
| Year | Category | Nominated work | Result | Ref. |
|---|---|---|---|---|
| 1983 | Best Rock Performance by a Duo or Group with Vocal | "Burning Down the House" | Nominated | |
| 1988 | Best Album of Original Instrumental Background Score Written for a Motion Picture or Television | The Last Emperor | Won | |
| 1988 | Best Concept Music Video | Storytelling Giant | Nominated | |
| 2009 | Best Alternative Music Album | Everything That Happens Will Happen Today | Nominated | |
| 2018 | Best Alternative Music Album | American Utopia | Nominated | |
| 2020 | Best Musical Theater Album | American Utopia on Broadway | Nominated | |
| 2021 | Best Music Film | David Byrne's American Utopia | Nominated | |

=== Primetime Emmy Awards ===
| Year | Category | Work | Result | Ref. |
|---|---|---|---|---|
| 2021 | Outstanding Variety Special (Pre-Recorded) | David Byrne's American Utopia | Nominated | |

=== Tony Awards ===
| Year | Category | Nominated work | Result | Ref. |
|---|---|---|---|---|
| 2021 | Special Tony Award | David Byrne's American Utopia | Won | |
| 2024 | Best Original Score | Here Lies Love | Nominated | |

== Miscellaneous awards ==
=== BMI Film & TV Awards ===
| Year | Category | Nominated work | Result | Ref. |
|---|---|---|---|---|
| 2007 | BMI Cable Award | Big Love | Won | |

=== Cinema Eye Honors ===
| Year | Category | Nominated work | Result | Ref. |
|---|---|---|---|---|
| 2016 | Outstanding Achievement in Original Music Score | Contemporary Color | Won | |

=== Clio Awards ===
| Year | Category | Nominated work | Result | Ref. |
|---|---|---|---|---|
| 2026 | Who Is the Sky? | Design - Mixed Campaign | Silver | |
| 2026 | Who Is the Sky? - Deluxe LP | Design - Packaging | Gold | |

=== David di Donatello Awards ===
| Year | Category | Nominated work | Result | Ref. |
|---|---|---|---|---|
| 2012 | Best Musician | This Must Be the Place | Won | |
| 2012 | Best Original Song | "If It Falls, It Falls" (from This Must Be the Place) | Won | |

=== Denver Film Critics Society Awards ===
| Year | Category | Nominated work | Result | Ref. |
|---|---|---|---|---|
| 2022 | Best Original Song | "This Is a Life" (from Everything Everywhere All at Once) | Nominated | |

=== Drama Desk Awards ===
| Year | Category | Nominated work | Result | Ref. |
|---|---|---|---|---|
| 2013 | Outstanding Music | Here Lies Love | Won | |

=== Guild of Music Supervisors Awards ===
| Year | Category | Nominated work | Result | Ref. |
|---|---|---|---|---|
| 2022 | Best Song Written and/or Recorded for a Film | "This Is a Life" (from Everything Everywhere All at Once) | Won | |

=== Hawaii Film Critics Society Awards ===
| Year | Category | Nominated work | Result | Ref. |
|---|---|---|---|---|
| 2022 | Best Song | "This Is a Life" (from Everything Everywhere All at Once) | Nominated | |

=== Hollywood Music in Media Awards ===
| Year | Category | Nominated work | Result | Ref. |
|---|---|---|---|---|
| 2022 | Best Original Song – Independent Film | "This Is a Life" (from Everything Everywhere All at Once) | Nominated | |

=== Independent Spirit Awards ===
| Year | Category | Nominated work | Result | Ref. |
|---|---|---|---|---|
| 1986 | Best First Feature | True Stories | Nominated | |

=== Los Angeles Film Critics Association Awards ===
| Year | Category | Nominated work | Result | Ref. |
|---|---|---|---|---|
| 1987 | Best Music Score | The Last Emperor | Won | |

=== MTV Video Music Awards ===
| Year | Category | Nominated work | Result | Ref. |
|---|---|---|---|---|
| 1985 | Video Vanguard Award | —N/a | Won | |
| 1992 | Breakthrough Video | "She's Mad" | Nominated | |
| 1992 | Best Special Effects | "She's Mad" | Nominated | |

=== North Carolina Film Critics Association Awards ===
| Year | Category | Nominated work | Result | Ref. |
|---|---|---|---|---|
| 2022 | Best Original Song | "This Is a Life" (from Everything Everywhere All at Once) | Nominated | |

=== Online Film Critics Society Awards ===
| Year | Honor | Result | Ref. |
|---|---|---|---|
| 2020 | Lifetime Achievement Award | Won | |

=== Webby Awards ===
| Year | Honor | Result | Ref. |
|---|---|---|---|
| 2008 | Webby Lifetime Achievement | Won | |

== Special honors ==
=== Rock and Roll Hall of Fame ===
| Year | Honor | Result | Ref. |
|---|---|---|---|
| 2002 | Rock and Roll Hall of Fame | Inducted (Note: As part of Talking Heads.) | |
