= Biscuits (Ted Lasso) =

- Ted Lasso episode
- Episode no.: Season 1 Episode 2
- Directed by: Zach Braff
- Story by: Brendan Hunt; Jason Sudeikis
- Teleplay by: Joe Kelly
- Cinematography by: John Sorapure
- Editing by: A.J. Catoline
- Original release date: August 14, 2020
- Running time: 30 minutes

Guest appearances
- Toheeb Jimoh as Sam Obisanya; Annette Badland as Mae; James Lance as Trent Crimm

Episode chronology
← Previous "Pilot"	Next → "Trent Crimm: The Independent"

"Biscuits" is the second episode of the American sports comedy-drama television series Ted Lasso, based on the character played by Jason Sudeikis in a series of promos for NBC Sports' coverage of England's Premier League. The episode was written by Joe Kelly from a story by Brendan Hunt and Jason Sudeikis, and directed by Zach Braff. It was released on Apple TV+ on August 14, 2020, alongside "Pilot" and "Trent Crimm: The Independent".

The series follows Ted Lasso, an American college football coach, who is unexpectedly recruited to coach a fictional English Premier League soccer team, AFC Richmond, despite having no experience coaching soccer. The team's owner, Rebecca Welton, hires Lasso hoping he will fail as a means of exacting revenge on the team's previous owner, her unfaithful ex-husband. In the episode, Ted's first days with the club prove to be far more difficult than it appeared, so he hopes to raise the club's esteem.

The episode received positive reviews from critics, who praised Braff's directing, performances and character development. For his performance in the episode, Jeremy Swift was nominated for Outstanding Supporting Actor in a Comedy Series at the 73rd Primetime Emmy Awards. Additionally, Zach Braff received an Outstanding Directing for a Comedy Series nomination.

== Plot ==
Before starting his first day as coach, Ted brings shortbread cookies – which the British call biscuits – to Rebecca, intending to bring her biscuits every day. Although she claims to not be interested in the biscuits, she soon becomes obsessed with them. During training, Jamie constantly bullies Sam, forcing Roy to intervene to avoid conflict.

Ted's lack of concern for the club's low stats annoys Roy and Jamie. Noticing that Sam is depressed, Ted and Beard deduce that he is homesick for his birthplace, Nigeria. Wanting to cheer him up, they decide to throw him a birthday party with the players donating some money and gifts. Ted notices that Jamie is not taking the club seriously, and visits with Keeley during a photo shoot to learn more about Jamie, discovering that he likes to be praised. A paparazzo takes pictures of them close together. Meanwhile, Rebecca is taken aback when she discovers that Rupert is dating a younger woman with whom he cheated during their marriage.

After a game against Crystal Palace F.C., the club throws a birthday party for Sam, which elates him. Although Ted's first match ended in a 4-1 loss for Richmond, Roy is delighted when he finds that Ted had the inadequate water pressure in the showers fixed. Guided by Keeley's advice, Ted compliments Jamie on his role in the field but tells him his overconfidence may keep him from acknowledging his teammates. When questioned by Trent Crimm, a reporter from The Independent, Jamie recognizes his team's efforts. However, he changes his mind, and criticizes Ted's role as the coach. A phone call from Higgins to Rebecca reveals that she sent the paparazzo to photograph Ted and Keeley. As she tries to find where Ted buys his biscuits, Ted is seen making the biscuits at his apartment.

== Development ==
=== Production ===
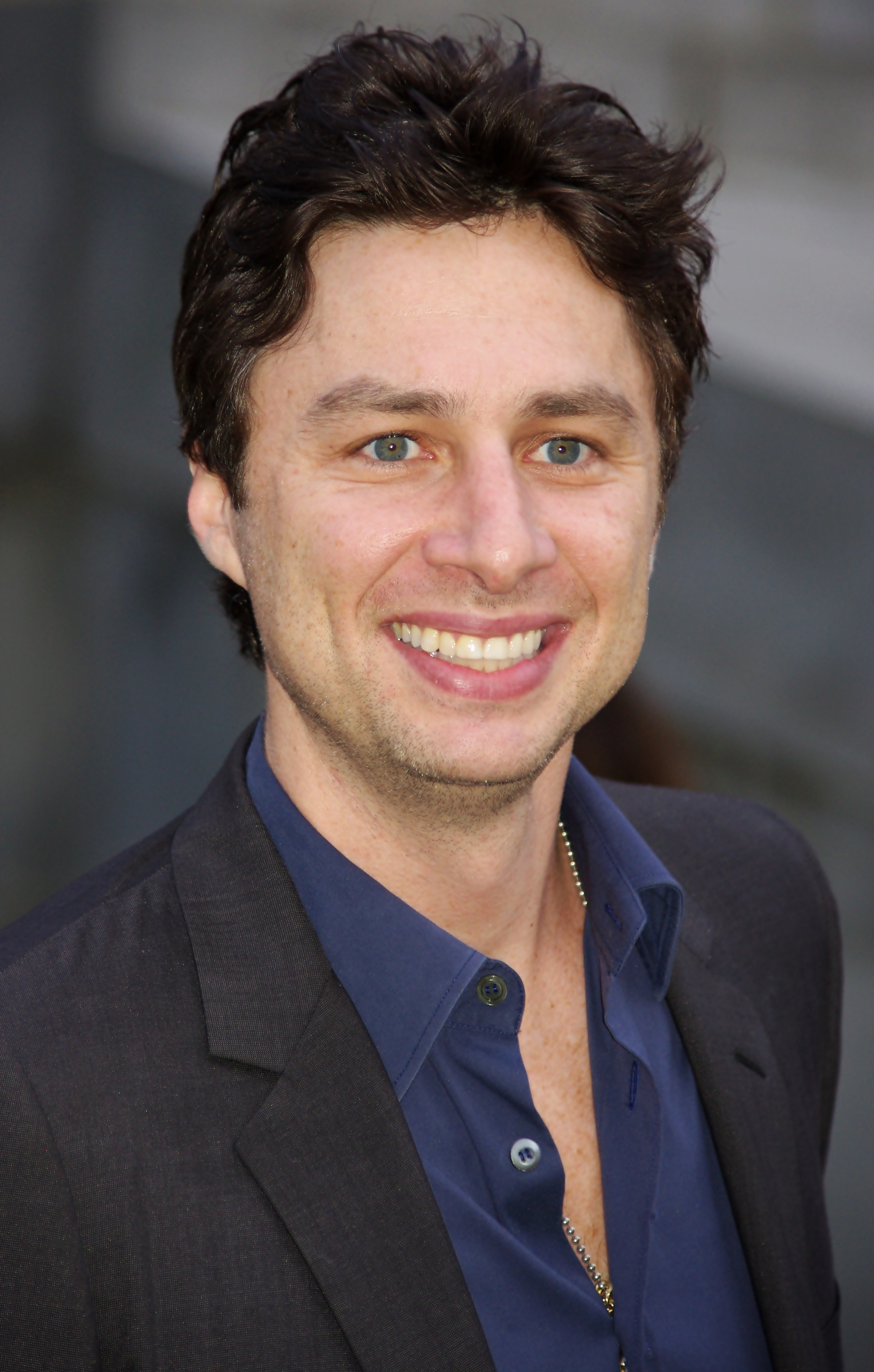
Zach Braff, who previously worked with Bill Lawrence on Scrubs, directed the episode.

The character of Ted Lasso first appeared in 2013 as part of NBC Sports promoting their coverage of the Premier League, portrayed by Jason Sudeikis. In October 2019, Apple TV+ gave a series order to a series focused on the character, with Sudeikis reprising his role and co-writing the episode with executive producer Bill Lawrence. Sudeikis and collaborators Brendan Hunt and Joe Kelly started working on a project around 2015, which evolved further when Lawrence joined the series. The episode was directed by Zach Braff and written by Joe Kelly from a story by main cast actors Brendan Hunt and Jason Sudeikis. This was Braff's first directing credit, Kelly's second writing, Hunt's second writing credit, and Sudeikis' second writing credit for the show.

=== Filming ===
Zach Braff previously worked with Bill Lawrence on Scrubs, where he also directed episodes. He accepted the offer to direct the episode, describing it as "my first time coming aboard something that I had nothing to do with previously." Braff was advised by director Alexander Payne before filming the episode, who told him that when filming, he should think "what does it mean to you if I tell you to tousle its hair?" Many of the scenes were filmed but Braff was convinced by the crew to remove them as they were "upstaging the moment."

== Critical reviews ==
"Biscuits" received positive reviews from critics. Gissane Sophia of Marvelous Geeks Media wrote, "Ted Lasso's 'Biscuits' does an exquisite job of projecting the kind of warmth that sitting at home (or in your favorite space, wherever that may be) brings forth. In its attentiveness to show character struggles and the longing they are engulfed with, it shows its audience that a small ounce of kindness could help people find the very warmth they've lost. 'Biscuits' is a metaphor for home, and this show feels just like it too."

Mads Lennon of FanSided wrote, "The second episode of Ted Lasso Season 1 begins with Ted getting started on an offbeat sort of day. His shredded wheat is not shredded, and he almost gets hit by a car, although Coach Beard stops that from happening." Daniel Hart of Ready Steady Cut gave the episode a 3.5 star rating out of 5 wrote, "Episode 2 shows Rebecca going to great lengths to undermine the football club in another funny chapter."

=== Awards and accolades ===
Jeremy Swift submitted this episode for consideration for his Primetime Emmy Award for Outstanding Supporting Actor in a Comedy Series nomination at the 73rd Primetime Emmy Awards. He lost the award to his co-star, Brett Goldstein.

Zach Braff was nominated for Outstanding Directing for a Comedy Series at the 73rd Primetime Emmy Awards, losing to Hacks for the episode "There Is No Line". He was also nominated for Directorial Achievement in a Comedy Series at the 73rd Directors Guild of America Awards, losing to The Flight Attendant for the episode "In Case of Emergency".
