= 2008 Webby Awards =

US internet awards ceremony

The 12th annual 2008 Webby Awards were held on June 10, 2008 and emceed by SNL head writer Seth Meyers and held at Cipriani, a massive banquet hall in Manhattan's financial district. The Webby Film and Video Awards were held on June 9 at Skirball Center for the Performing Arts and were hosted by Judah Friedlander. The awards were judged by the International Academy of Digital Arts and Sciences, and winners were selected from over 10,000 entries. Lorne Michaels was honored with a lifetime achievement award.

== Nominees and winners ==
(from http://www.webbyawards.com/winners/2008)

Category	Webby Award winner	People's Voice winner	Other nominees
Activism	Loveisrespect, National Teen Dating Abuse Helpline (Archived 11 June 2008 via Wayback); RF Interactive	Invisible Children - Displace Me (Archived 10 June 2008 via Wayback); Digitaria	Eyes on Darfur (Archived 10 June 2008 via Wayback); Citizen
Activism	Loveisrespect, National Teen Dating Abuse Helpline (Archived 11 June 2008 via Wayback); RF Interactive	Invisible Children - Displace Me (Archived 10 June 2008 via Wayback); Digitaria	H&M - Fashion Against AIDS (Archived 28 June 2011 via Wayback); Great Works
Activism	Loveisrespect, National Teen Dating Abuse Helpline (Archived 11 June 2008 via Wayback); RF Interactive	Invisible Children - Displace Me (Archived 10 June 2008 via Wayback); Digitaria	Make It Right (Archived 16 May 2008 via Wayback); MGX LAB
Online Film & Video - Experimental	Crimeface (Archived 5 July 2008 via Wayback); Bellyfeel Limited		Atmosphere (Series) (Archived 20 August 2008 via Wayback); National Geographic Digital Media
Online Film & Video - Experimental	Crimeface (Archived 5 July 2008 via Wayback); Bellyfeel Limited		Close to paradise - prologue (Archived 17 June 2008 via Wayback); Bluesponge
Online Film & Video - Experimental	Crimeface (Archived 5 July 2008 via Wayback); Bellyfeel Limited		Rabbit (Archived 18 June 2008 via Wayback); MTV Networks / Atom Films
Online Film & Video - Experimental	Crimeface (Archived 5 July 2008 via Wayback); Bellyfeel Limited		The Encyclopedia of Life (Archived 3 June 2008 via Wayback); Avenue A | Razorfish
Online Film & Video - Variety	Tom Green's House Tonight TomGreen.com	The Totally Rad Show K/F Communications	Epic Fu Smashface Productions, LLC
Online Film & Video - Variety	Tom Green's House Tonight TomGreen.com	The Totally Rad Show K/F Communications	Screen Test The New York Times/T Magazine
Online Film & Video - Variety	Tom Green's House Tonight TomGreen.com	The Totally Rad Show K/F Communications	What's the Big Idea? with Danny DeVito GOOD
Games	Kongregate (Archived 10 June 2008 via Wayback); Kongregate		ElectroCity (Archived 13 June 2008 via Wayback); Rivet
Games	Kongregate (Archived 10 June 2008 via Wayback); Kongregate		Launchball (Archived 10 June 2008 via Wayback); Preloaded
Games	Kongregate (Archived 10 June 2008 via Wayback); Kongregate		Sharkrunners (Archived 8 June 2008 via Wayback); Discovery Communications, Inc.
Games	Kongregate (Archived 10 June 2008 via Wayback); Kongregate		World Without Oil (Archived 11 June 2008 via Wayback); Writerguy LLC
Games-Related	The Escapist (Archived 9 June 2008 via Wayback); Themis Group Inc		Gamasutra.com (Archived 10 June 2008 via Wayback); Think Services
Games-Related	The Escapist (Archived 9 June 2008 via Wayback); Themis Group Inc		GameLife Blog on Wired.com (Archived 9 May 2008 via Wayback) wired media
Games-Related	The Escapist (Archived 9 June 2008 via Wayback); Themis Group Inc		Gamezebo (Archived 11 June 2008 via Wayback) gamezebo
Games-Related	The Escapist (Archived 9 June 2008 via Wayback); Themis Group Inc		ROCK BAND.com (Archived 9 May 2008 via Wayback); Harmonix Music Systems/MTV Games/Mekanism
Mobile & Apps - Gaming	Nike 10R - Tone Mastering (Archived 7 April 2008 via Wayback); Mantra	Dr. Pepper iPhone Game - Matchcaps (Archived 21 December 2007 via Wayback); Imaginuity Interactive, Inc.	Cellufun http://wap.cellufun.com Cellufun, Inc.
Mobile & Apps - Gaming	Nike 10R - Tone Mastering (Archived 7 April 2008 via Wayback); Mantra	Dr. Pepper iPhone Game - Matchcaps (Archived 21 December 2007 via Wayback); Imaginuity Interactive, Inc.	DHL Stack 'Em http://www.wwpl.net/webbys2008/dhl/stackit.html Ogilvy & Mather, NY
Mobile & Apps - Gaming	Nike 10R - Tone Mastering (Archived 7 April 2008 via Wayback); Mantra	Dr. Pepper iPhone Game - Matchcaps (Archived 21 December 2007 via Wayback); Imaginuity Interactive, Inc.	Nickelodeon Mobile (Archived 5 July 2008 via Wayback); MTV Networks
Interactive Advertising - Game or Application	Coca-Cola Happiness Factory - metaverse (Archived 12 June 2008 via Wayback); Rivers Run Red		AXE Dirty Rolling Game (Archived 1 June 2008 via Wayback); BBH New York
Interactive Advertising - Game or Application	Coca-Cola Happiness Factory - metaverse (Archived 12 June 2008 via Wayback); Rivers Run Red		NBC's Bionic Woman - Bionic Assessment Test (Archived 15 June 2008 via Wayback); Fanscape
Interactive Advertising - Game or Application	Coca-Cola Happiness Factory - metaverse (Archived 12 June 2008 via Wayback); Rivers Run Red		Nike Plus Miles (Archived 7 June 2008 via Wayback); Tribal DDB GmbH, member of DDB Germany
Interactive Advertising - Game or Application	Coca-Cola Happiness Factory - metaverse (Archived 12 June 2008 via Wayback); Rivers Run Red		Orange 'Spot The Bull' (Archived 12 October 2012 via Wayback); POKE
Consumer Electronics	It's D Hakuhodo I-studio	Seduction by Light; DDB Worldwide	Motorola - Motofone "RETHINK FONE"; Draftfcb
Consumer Electronics	It's D Hakuhodo I-studio	Seduction by Light; DDB Worldwide	Sony Alpha - Next Level; HMX Media
Consumer Electronics	It's D Hakuhodo I-studio	Seduction by Light; DDB Worldwide	Sony Vaio; Dare
This table is not complete, please help to complete it from material on this page.
