= Trent Crimm: The Independent =

- Ted Lasso episode
- Episode no.: Season 1 Episode 3
- Directed by: Tom Marshall
- Written by: Jane Becker
- Cinematography by: David Rom
- Editing by: Melissa McCoy
- Original release date: August 14, 2020
- Running time: 31 minutes

Guest appearances
- Toheeb Jimoh as Sam Obisanya; James Lance as Trent Crimm

Episode chronology
| ← Previous "Biscuits" | Next → "For the Children" |

"Trent Crimm: The Independent" is the third episode of the American sports comedy-drama television series Ted Lasso, based on the character played by Jason Sudeikis in a series of promos for NBC Sports' coverage of England's Premier League. The episode was written by supervising producer Jane Becker and directed by Tom Marshall. It was released on Apple TV+ on August 14, 2020, alongside the previous two episodes.

The series follows Ted Lasso, an American college football coach, who is unexpectedly recruited to coach a fictional English Premier League soccer team, AFC Richmond, despite having no experience coaching soccer. The team's owner, Rebecca Welton, hires Lasso hoping he will fail as a means of exacting revenge on the team's previous owner, her unfaithful ex-husband. In the episode, Ted must spend a day with Trent Crimm, a reporter for The Independent who questions his leadership, as a favor to Rebecca preventing a photograph from being published.

The episode received positive reviews from critics, who praised the character development, tone and performances, particularly Jason Sudeikis and Brett Goldstein.

== Plot ==
Rebecca is annoyed when she discovers that The Sun has not published the incriminating photos of Ted and Keeley. Ted and Beard are struggling to develop a strategy for the club. They decide to use a strategy proposed by Nate, who is delighted.

Keeley tells Ted that a contact informed her about the photographs but can only prevent them from going public for one day. They talk with Rebecca, who states she will use her influence over The Sun to prevent the photographs from being published. After they leave, she worries that they will trace the photos back to her. Meanwhile, noticing Jamie and other players bullying Nate, Roy asks Ted if he plans to do anything about it. To his surprise, Ted says he won't intervene because that could cause the bullying to escalate. Roy decides to confront Jamie himself, threatening him to stop bullying Nate. To his face, Jamie agrees, but then tells the players to continue doing so.

Rebecca tells Ted that, in exchange for stopping the publication of the photos, Ted will be interviewed by The Independent reporter, Trent Crimm. Crimm is taken aback when he finds that Ted's strategy was conceived by Nate and that Ted is not concerned about winning or losing. He accompanies Ted and Roy to a local school event, where Roy wins over the children by playing soccer with them. Ted and Crimm then go to an Indian restaurant, owned by the driver who picked up Ted at the airport. Ted eats the food despite its highly spicy nature. He tells Crimm that his lack of concern about losses is about believing in his team and in everyone to feel confident. Crimm leaves, with everything he needs to know.

Guided by the book A Wrinkle in Time that Ted gave him, Roy decides to take matters in his own hands and tells Jamie and his friends to stop bullying Nate. At night, Higgins reads Crimm's article to Rebecca. Crimm wrote that, even though Ted's nature and methods will not be well received and that he believes the club's relegation is inevitable, he will be supporting the "Lasso Way", leaving Rebecca furious.

== Production ==
The character of Ted Lasso first appeared in 2013 as part of NBC Sports promoting their coverage of the Premier League, portrayed by Jason Sudeikis. In October 2019, Apple TV+ gave a series order to a series focused on the character, with Sudeikis reprising his role and co-writing the episode with executive producer Bill Lawrence. Sudeikis and collaborators Brendan Hunt and Joe Kelly started working on a project around 2015, which evolved further when Lawrence joined the series. The episode was directed by Tom Marshall and written by supervising producer Jane Becker. This was Marshall's second directing credit, and Becker's first writing credit for the show.

== Critical reviews ==
"Trent Crimm: The Independent" received positive reviews from critics. Gissane Sophia of Marvelous Geeks Media wrote, "'Trent Crimm, The Independent' continues Ted Lasso's streak of superb episodes by setting up what essentially becomes this show's spirit. It's the show and characters you can't help but root for. And while the first two episodes do a solid job of selling the show's appeal, this is the episode that nails it shut. You're in now. You're invested. There's no going back."

Mads Lennon of FanSided wrote, "The third episode of Ted Lasso Season 1 sees the somewhat curmudgeonly reporter from The Independent, Trent Crimm, return in full-force for a personal profile of the coach himself. Much to Rebecca's chagrin, the profile doesn't wind up being as negative as she'd have hoped." Daniel Hart of Ready Steady Cut gave the episode a 3.5 star rating out of 5 wrote, "Episode 3 reveals Ted's coaching skills trying to shine through as he has an entire town to prove."

Daniela Gama of Collider named the episode among the 10 most heartwarming of the series, writing, "Episode 3 is quite comforting as it adds a pleasant twist on how Ted is perceived by the public eye. Thanks to James Lance's character Trent, who spends an entire day with Lasso and publishes his article on him at night, everyone who was skeptical about Richmond's new coach eventually realizes just how much of a humble and simple guy he is. Peak example of 'don't judge a book by its cover'."
