= Pilot (Ted Lasso) =

- Ted Lasso episode
- Episode no.: Season 1 Episode 1
- Directed by: Tom Marshall
- Story by: Jason Sudeikis; Bill Lawrence; Brendan Hunt; Joe Kelly
- Teleplay by: Jason Sudeikis; Bill Lawrence
- Cinematography by: David Rom
- Editing by: Melissa McCoy
- Original release date: August 14, 2020
- Running time: 31 minutes

Guest appearances
- Toheeb Jimoh as Sam Obisanya; James Lance as Trent Crimm

Episode chronology
← Previous —	Next → "Biscuits"

"Pilot" is the series premiere of the American sports comedy-drama television series Ted Lasso, based on the character played by Jason Sudeikis in a series of promos for NBC Sports' coverage of England's Premier League. The episode was written by Sudeikis and Bill Lawrence from a story by Sudeikis, Lawrence, Brendan Hunt and Joe Kelly, and directed by Tom Marshall. It was released on Apple TV+ on August 14, 2020, alongside the two follow-up episodes.

The series follows Ted Lasso, an American college football coach, who is unexpectedly recruited to coach a fictional English Premier League soccer team, AFC Richmond, despite having no experience coaching soccer. The team's owner, Rebecca Welton (Hannah Waddingham), hires Lasso hoping he will fail as a means of exacting revenge on the team's previous owner, her unfaithful ex-husband. The episode serves to introduce all the characters and establish their story arcs.

The series premiere received generally positive reviews from critics, who praised Sudeikis' performance, humor, and uplifting tone. For his performance in the episode, Jason Sudeikis won Outstanding Lead Actor in a Comedy Series at the 73rd Primetime Emmy Awards. Additionally, the episode received a nomination for Outstanding Writing for a Comedy Series.

== Plot ==
Rebecca Welton has been given ownership of the English Premier League soccer team, AFC Richmond, after a divorce settlement with her ex-husband, Rupert Mannion. Due to Rupert's constantly cheating on her, she plans to ruin the club, which was one of Rupert's most beloved assets. She fires the current coach and appoints American Ted Lasso as the new coach.

Ted is an American football coach that found success at the college level, having led the Wichita State Shockers football team to a championship, but lacks any kind of experience with soccer. Arriving at Richmond, London, he is accompanied by his assistant, Beard. They meet kit man Nathan Shelley, who introduces them to Rebecca. During a press conference, Ted makes a poor impression to the journalists and the public by displaying his lack of knowledge of soccer. Ted is also introduced to some of the players: hot-headed box-to-box midfielder Roy Kent, arrogant striker Jamie Tartt, and right-back Sam Obisanya.

None of the club's players have confidence in Ted, with Roy referring to him as "Ronald McDonald". Alone in the locker room, Ted meets Jamie's girlfriend, Keeley Jones, who helps him in putting up a "Believe" sign. As Ted leaves at night, Rebecca confides in her Director of Football Operations, Leslie Higgins, about her intentions to sabotage the team, also reminding him that he enabled Rupert to cheat on her. Arriving at his apartment, Ted talks with his son over the phone. He then talks with his wife, with the conversation revealing that she asked for space due to their strained relationship. The conversation (and the fact that he was unable to sleep on the plane on the way over) makes him lose sleep for the night.

== Development ==
=== Production ===
The character of Ted Lasso first appeared in 2013 as part of NBC Sports promoting their coverage of the Premier League, portrayed by Jason Sudeikis. In October 2019, Apple TV+ gave a series order to a series focused on the character, with Sudeikis reprising his role and co-writing the episode with executive producer Bill Lawrence. Sudeikis and collaborators Brendan Hunt and Joe Kelly started working on a project around 2015, which evolved further when Lawrence joined the series. The episode was directed by executive producer Tom Marshall and written by series creators Jason Sudeikis and Bill Lawrence from a story by Sudeikis, Lawrence, Brendan Hunt and Joe Kelly.

== Critical reviews ==
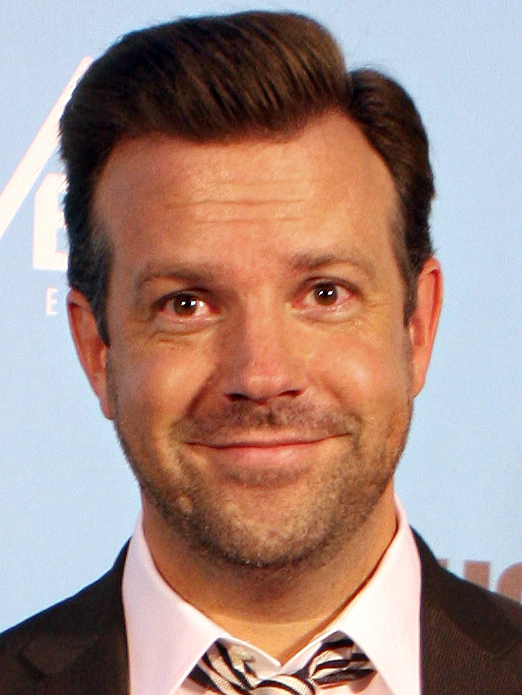
Jason Sudeikis's performance in the episode received critical acclaim. Sudeikis would win the Primetime Emmy Award for Outstanding Lead Actor in a Comedy Series for this episode.

The premiere received positive reviews from critics. Gissane Sophia of Marvelous Geeks Media wrote, "Right from the start we are shown just how much divorce has weighed on Rebecca, and we are shown how much this space from his wife is wounding Ted. We are shown that Roy Kent harbors a lot more than he lets on, and we are shown that there is a lot of potential no one has allowed Nate to explore. And as a Pilot, it promises that this is only the beginning of possibilities."

=== Awards and accolades ===
Jason Sudeikis submitted this episode for consideration for his Primetime Emmy Award for Outstanding Lead Actor in a Comedy Series nomination at the 73rd Primetime Emmy Awards. He would later win the award, earning his first Emmy win.

Sudeikis was also nominated alongside Bill Lawrence, Brendan Hunt and Joe Kelly for Outstanding Writing for a Comedy Series, losing to Hacks for the episode "There Is No Line". They were also nominated for Episodic Comedy at the 73rd Writers Guild of America Awards, losing to The Great for the episode The Great.
