= Call of the Pharaoh =

2008 video game

- Developer(s): Cellufun
- Publisher(s): Cellufun
- Platform(s): Mobile phone
- Release: WW: 2008
- Genre(s): Social game
- Mode(s): Single player, multiplayer

Call of the Pharaoh is a 2008 community-based mobile game developed and published by Cellufun.

== Gameplay ==
In the game, players within Cellufun's mobile community compete to build the biggest pyramids. Players must cooperate with others to get the building materials and manpower they need to further advance their pyramid.

== Awards ==
Call of the Pharaoh was awarded a joint win in the "Best Mobile Game" category at the Global Mobile Awards 2008.
