= 73rd Primetime Emmy Awards =

2021 American television programming awards

- Promotional poster
- Date: September 19, 2021 (Ceremony); September 11–12, 2021 (Creative Arts Emmys)
- Location: The Event Deck at L.A. Live; Los Angeles, California
- Presented by: Academy of Television Arts & Sciences
- Hosted by: Cedric the Entertainer

Highlights
- Most awards: Major: The Crown (7); All: The Crown / The Queen's Gambit (11)
- Most nominations: Major: Ted Lasso (13); All: The Crown / The Mandalorian (24)
- Comedy Series: Ted Lasso
- Drama Series: The Crown
- Limited or Anthology Series: The Queen's Gambit

Television/radio coverage
- Network: CBS; Paramount+
- Runtime: 3 hours, 15 minutes
- Viewership: 7.83 million
- Produced by: Done and Dusted; Hudlin Entertainment
- Directed by: Hamish Hamilton

The 73rd Primetime Emmy Awards honored the best in American prime time television programming from June 1, 2020, until May 31, 2021, as chosen by the Academy of Television Arts & Sciences. The award ceremony was held live on September 19, 2021, at the Event Deck at L.A. Live in Downtown Los Angeles, California, and was preceded by the 73rd Primetime Creative Arts Emmy Awards on September 11 and 12. During the ceremony, Emmy Awards were handed out in 27 different categories. The ceremony was produced by Reginald Hudlin and Ian Stewart, directed by Hamish Hamilton, and broadcast in the United States by CBS and Paramount+. Cedric the Entertainer served as host for the event.

At the main ceremony, The Crown became the first drama series to sweep all the major categories, winning all seven awards including Outstanding Drama Series. Ted Lasso led all comedies with four wins, including Outstanding Comedy Series, while Hacks won three awards. Mare of Easttown also won three awards, leading all limited series, but Outstanding Limited or Anthology Series went to The Queen's Gambit. Other winning programs include Halston, Hamilton, I May Destroy You, Last Week Tonight with John Oliver, RuPaul's Drag Race, Saturday Night Live, and Stephen Colbert's Election Night 2020. Including Creative Arts Emmys, The Crown and The Queen's Gambit led all programs with 11 wins each; Netflix led all networks and platforms with 44 total wins.

== Winners and nominees ==
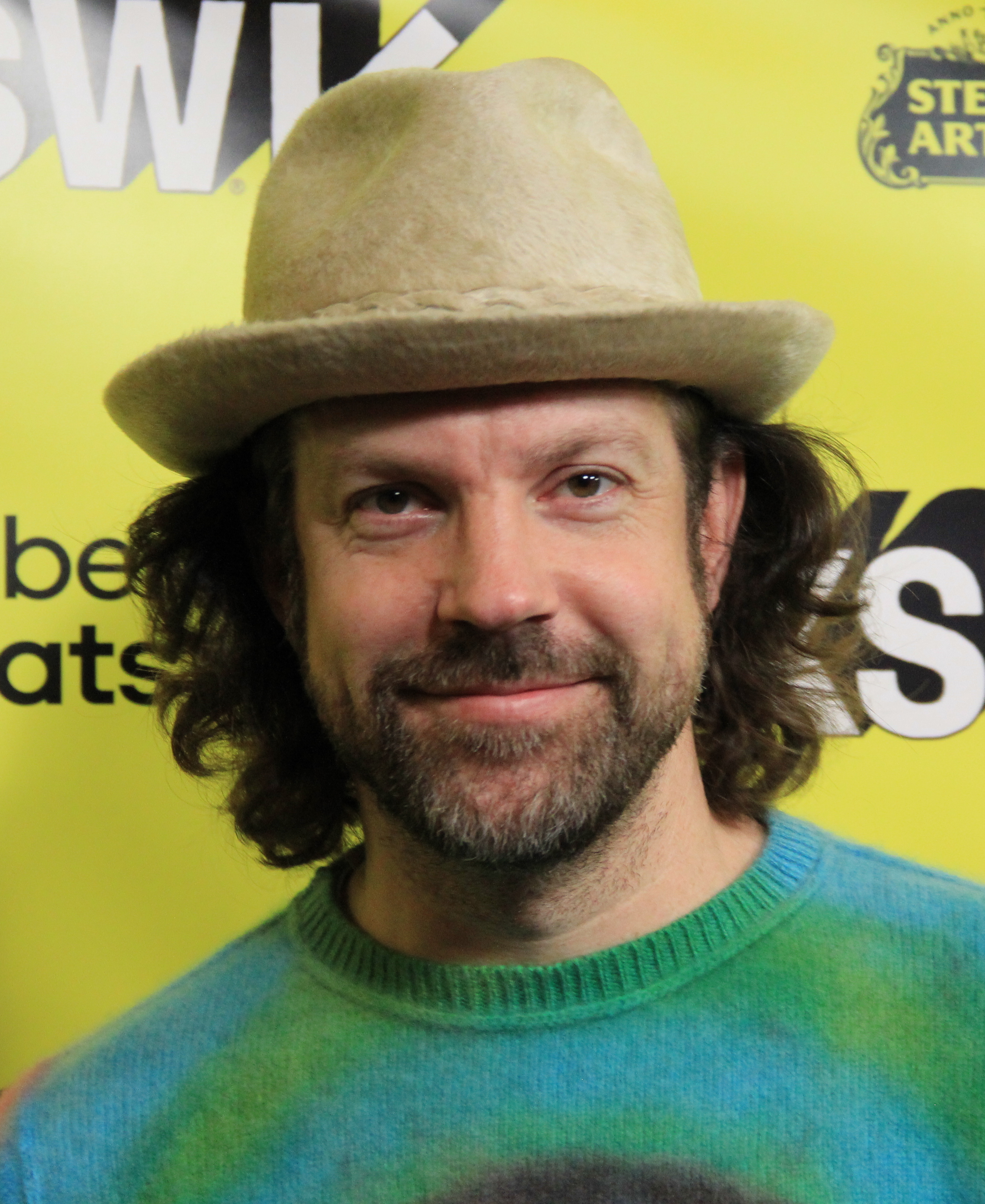
Jason Sudeikis, Outstanding Lead Actor in a Comedy Series winner

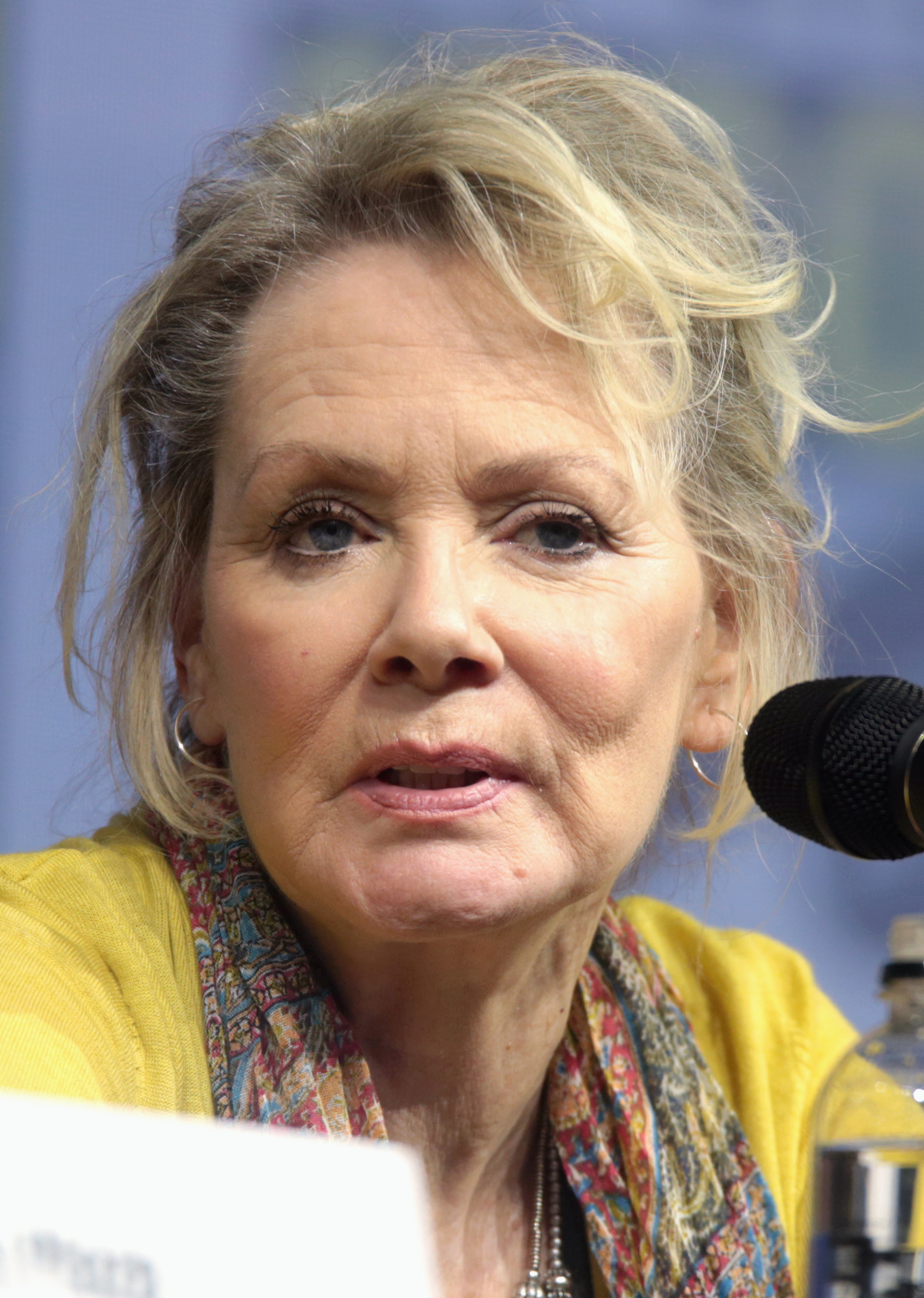
Jean Smart, Outstanding Lead Actress in a Comedy Series winner

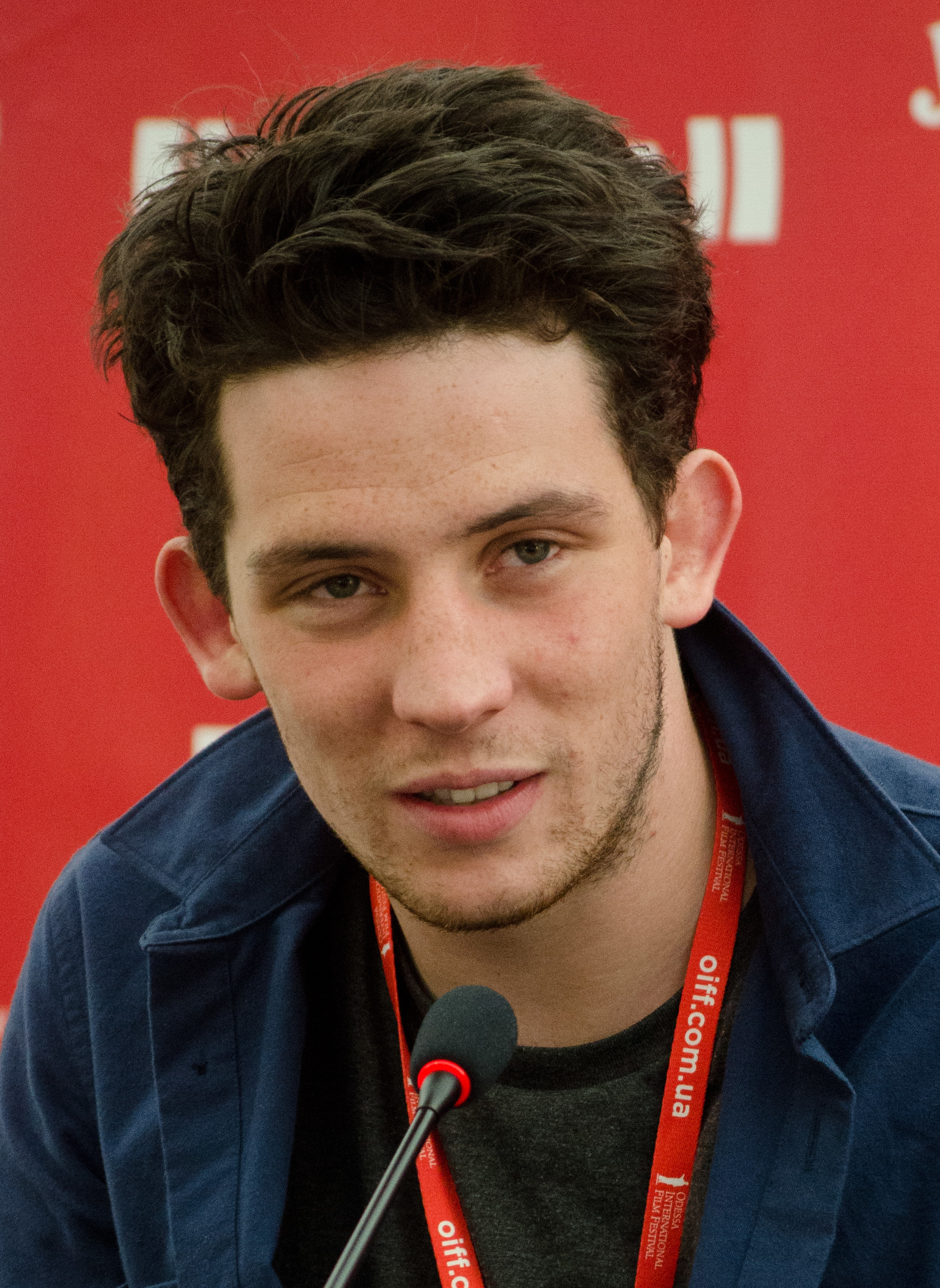
Josh O'Connor, Outstanding Lead Actor in a Drama Series winner

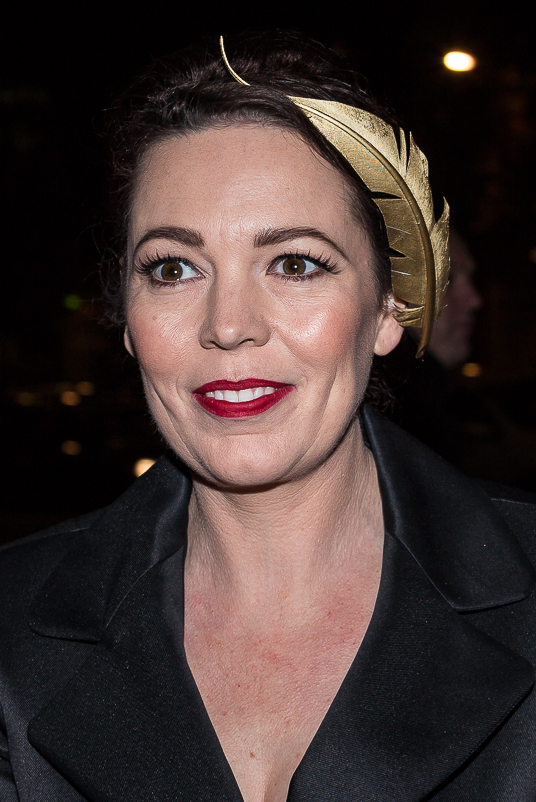
Olivia Colman, Outstanding Lead Actress in a Drama Series winner

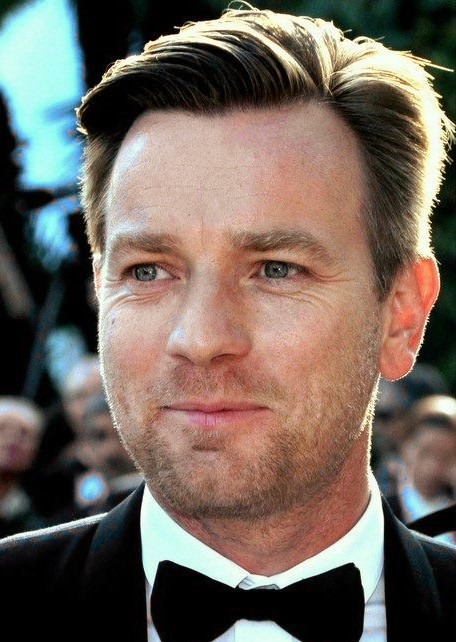
Ewan McGregor, Outstanding Lead Actor in a Limited or Anthology Series or Movie winner

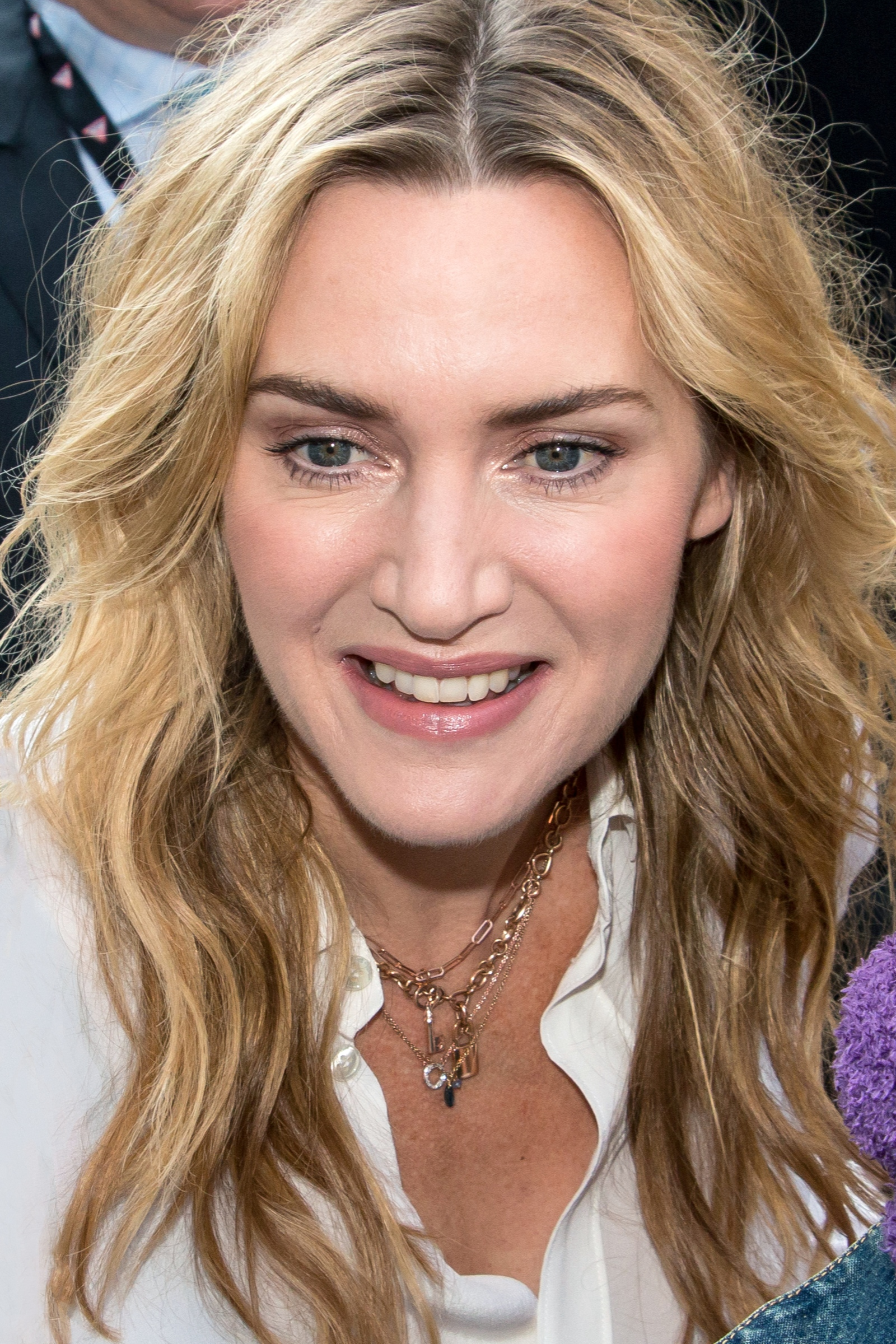
Kate Winslet, Outstanding Lead Actress in a Limited or Anthology Series or Movie winner

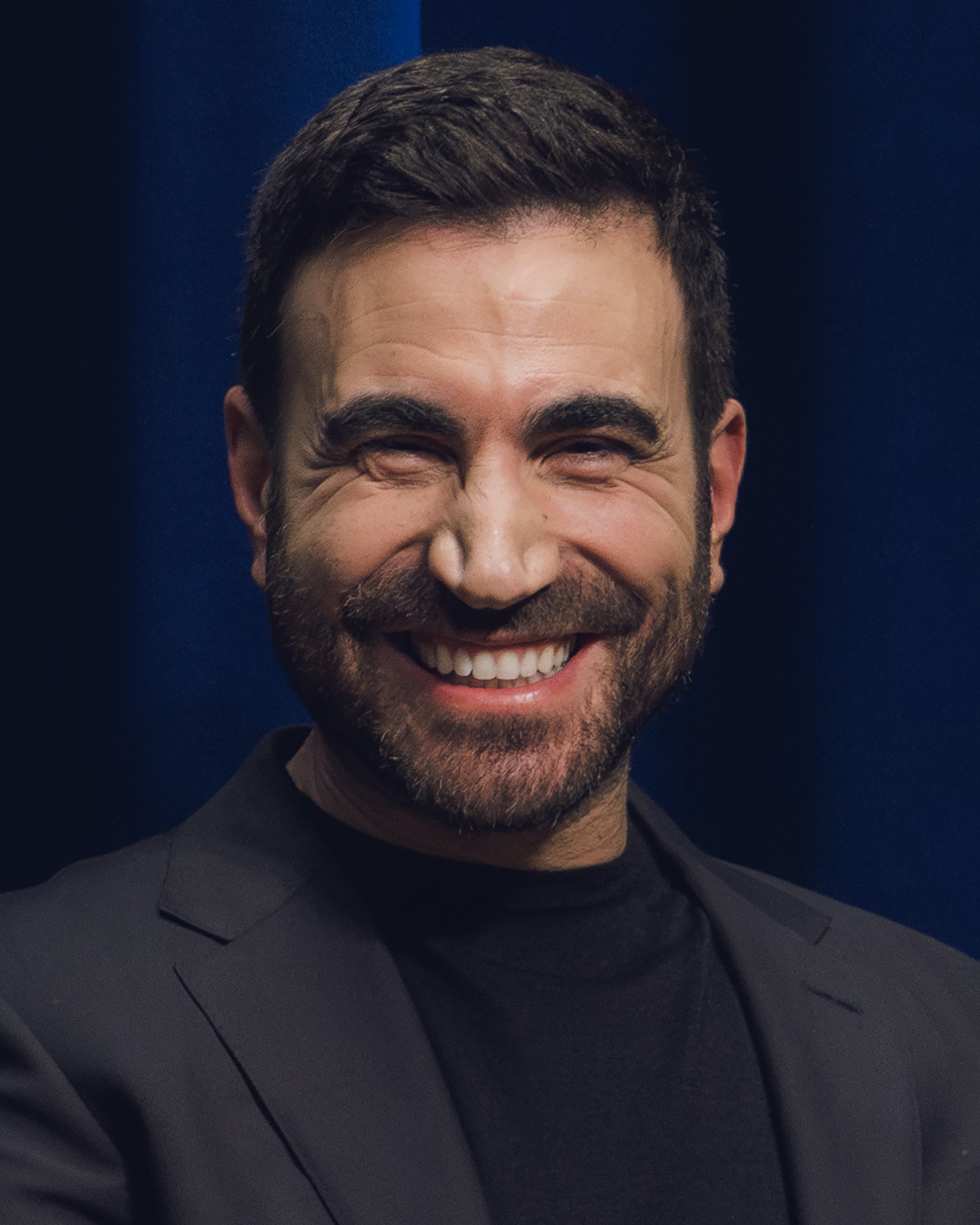
Brett Goldstein, Outstanding Supporting Actor in a Comedy Series winner

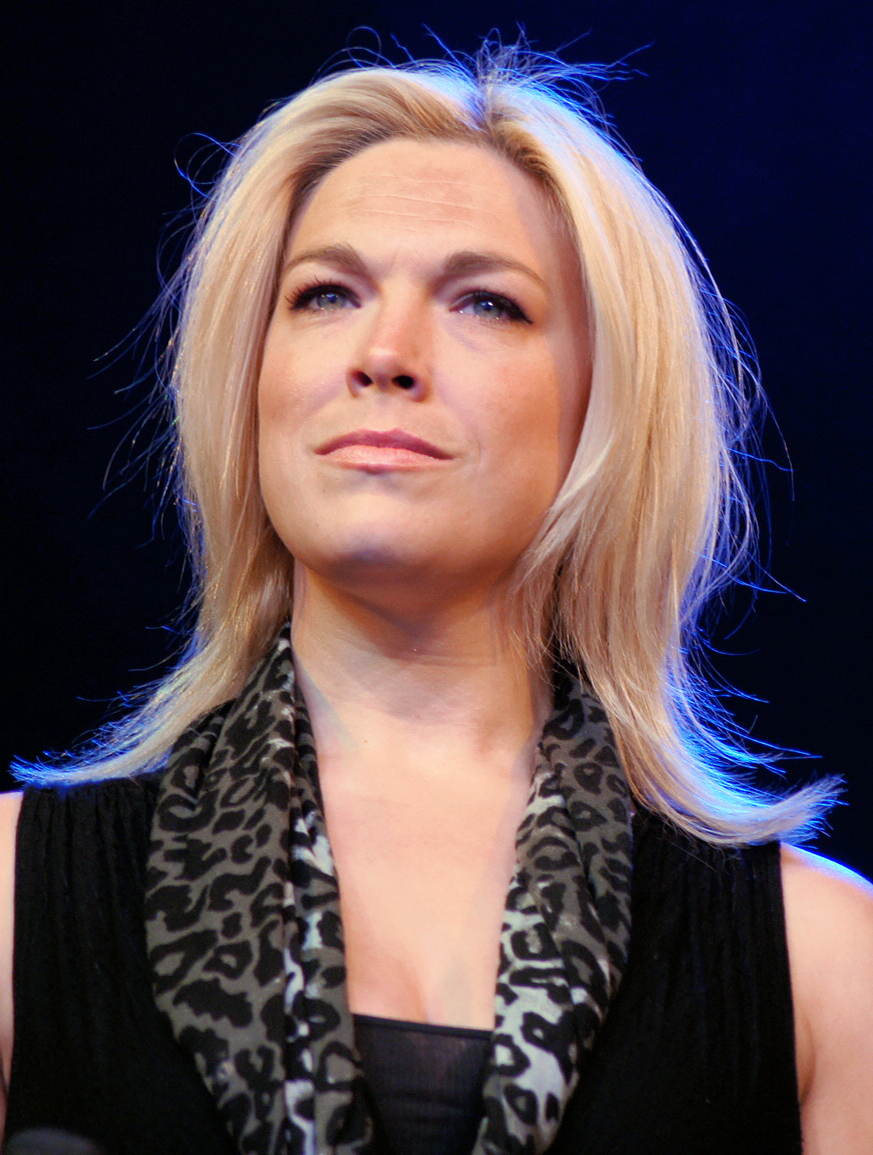
Hannah Waddingham, Outstanding Supporting Actress in a Comedy Series winner

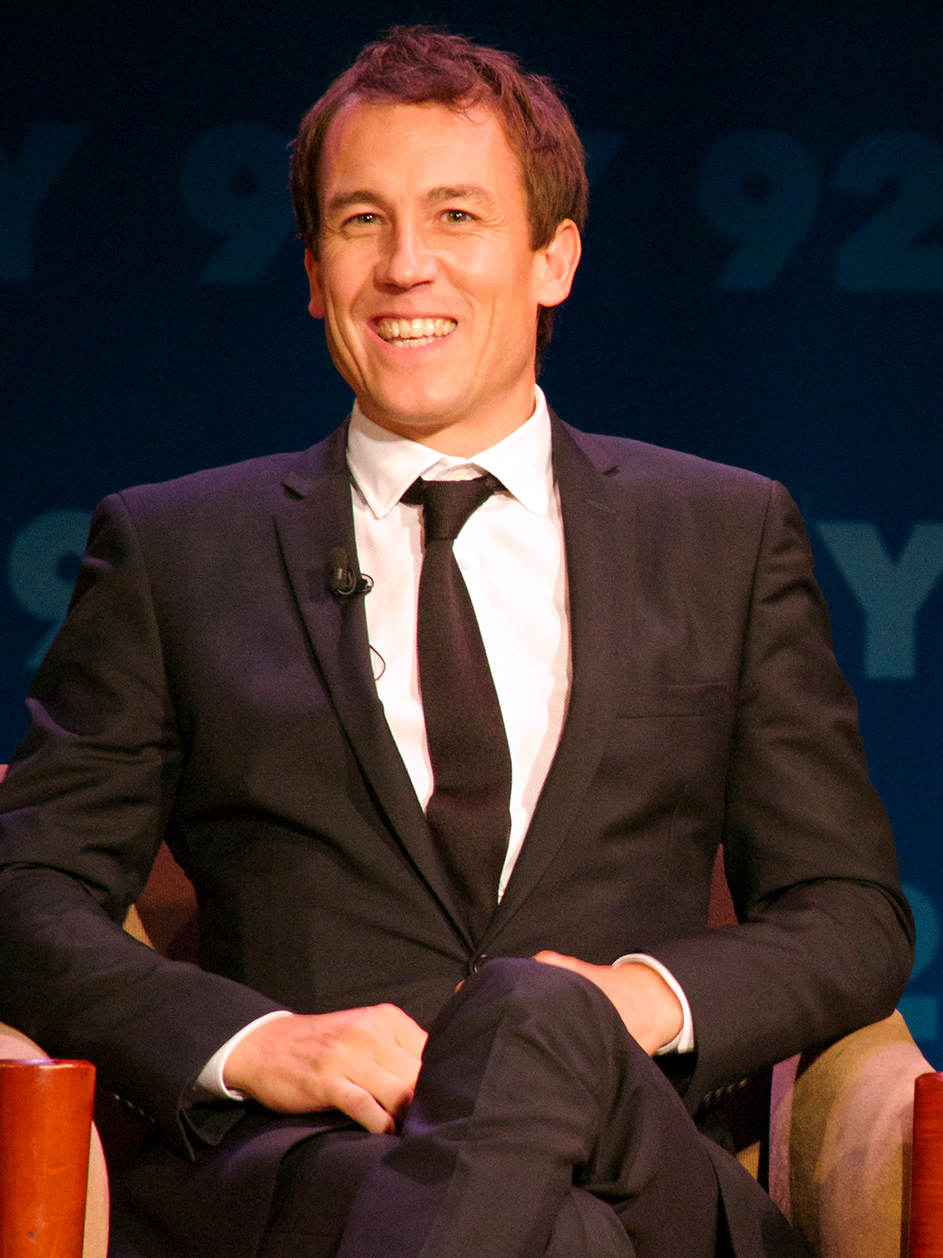
Tobias Menzies, Outstanding Supporting Actor in a Drama Series winner

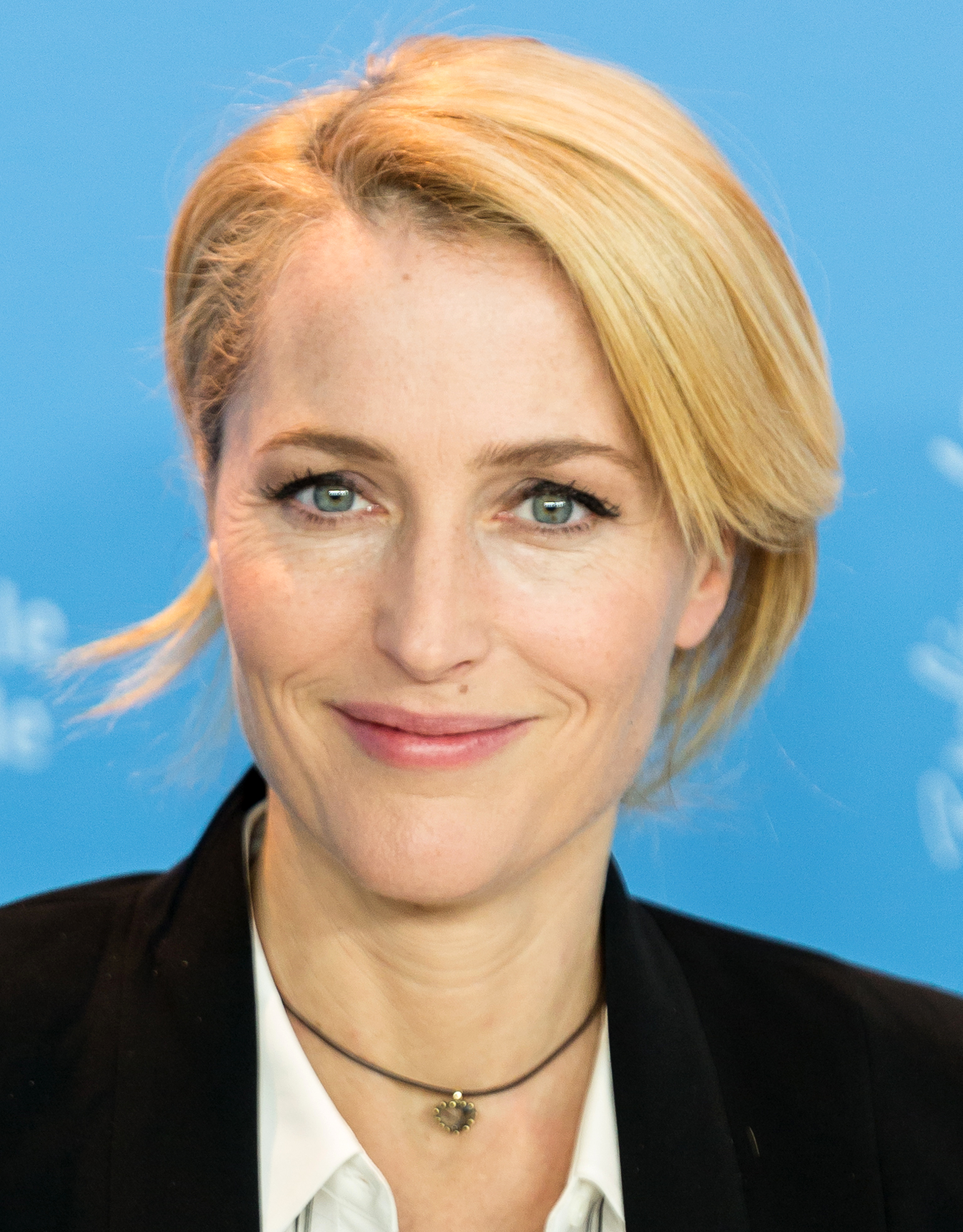
Gillian Anderson, Outstanding Supporting Actress in a Drama Series winner

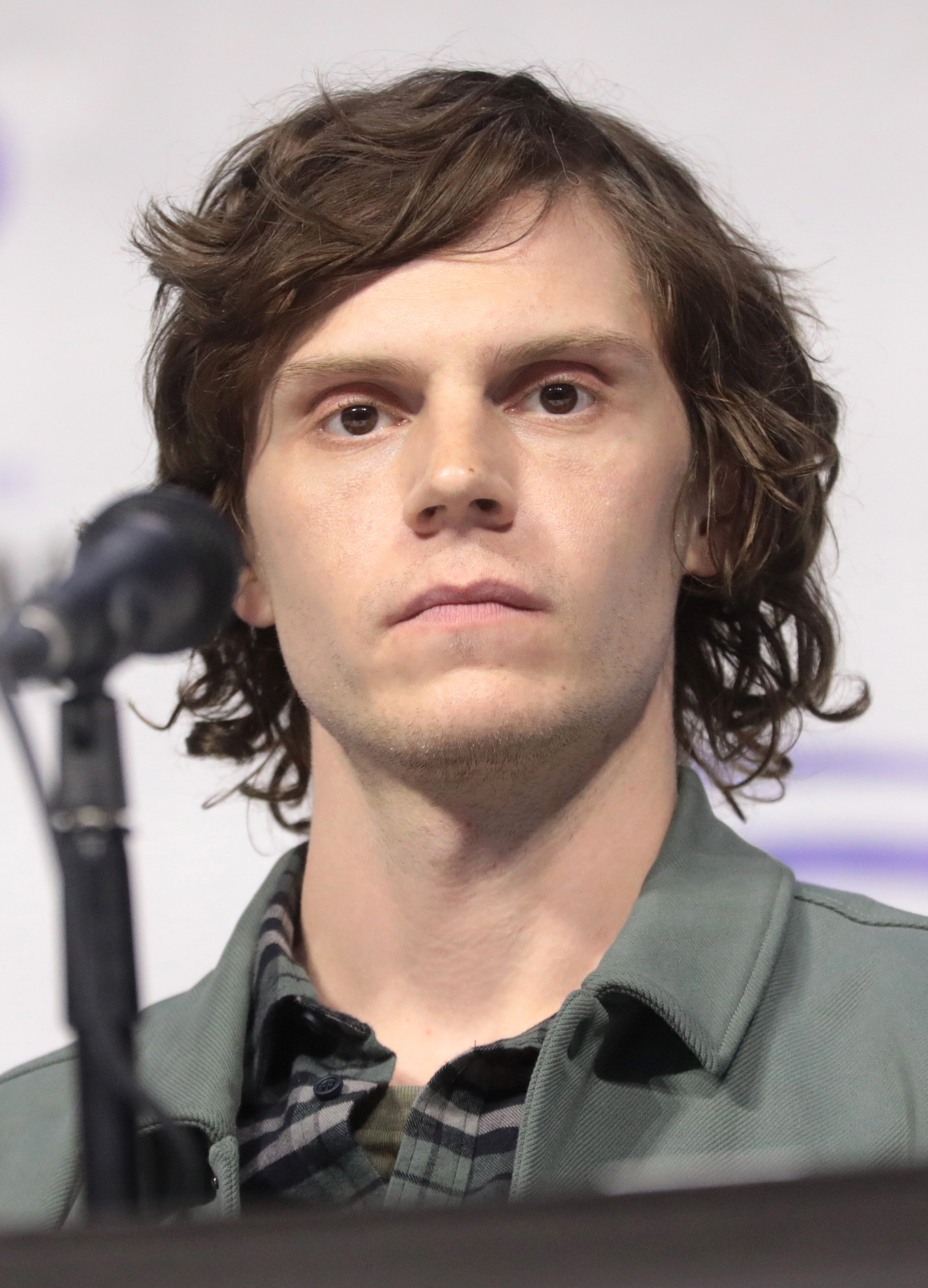
Evan Peters, Outstanding Supporting Actor in a Limited or Anthology Series or Movie winner

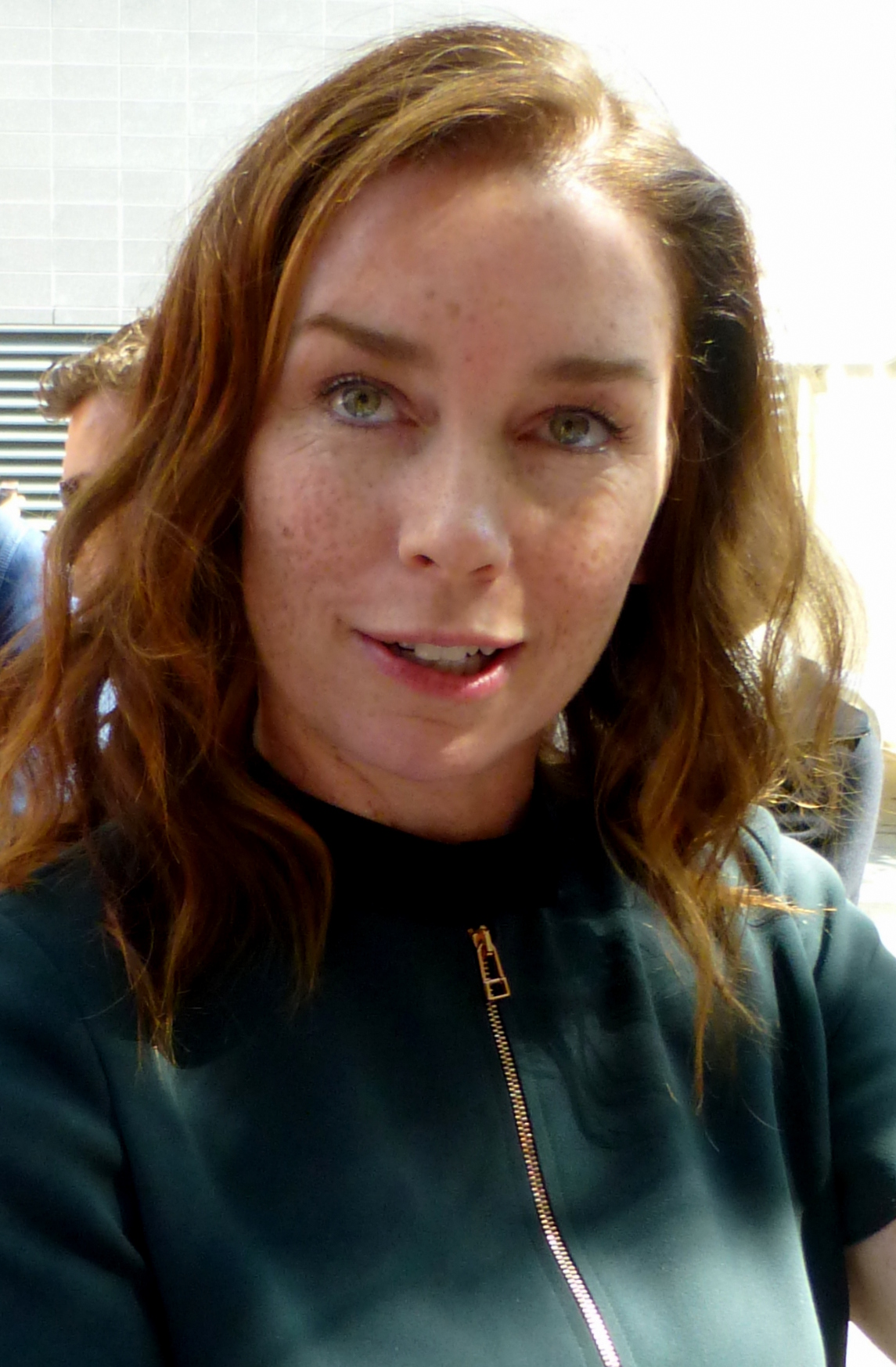
Julianne Nicholson, Outstanding Supporting Actress in a Limited or Anthology Series or Movie winner

The nominations for the 73rd Primetime Emmy Awards were announced on July 13, 2021, by Ron and Jasmine Cephas Jones via a virtual event. Including nominations at the 73rd Primetime Creative Arts Emmy Awards, The Crown and The Mandalorian tied for the most nominations, with 24 each. HBO and HBO Max received a combined 130 nominations, making them the most-nominated network, ahead of Netflix by only one nomination. Ted Lasso became the most-nominated first-year comedy series in the awards' history with 20 nominations; the Apple TV+ sports comedy surpassed the record held by the Fox musical comedy-drama Glee, which received 19 nominations in 2010. Michaela Jaé Rodriguez of the series Pose became the first transgender person to be nominated for a major acting Emmy Award. Additionally, 43 non-White actors received nominations for acting, besting the previous record of 36.

The winners were announced on September 19, following the Creative Arts Emmys on September 11 and 12. The Crown and The Queen's Gambit led all series with 11 wins each. The two shows gave Netflix its first series wins after 30 previous nominations for comedy, drama, and limited series dating back to 2013. The Crown won all seven drama categories at the main ceremony, becoming the first show to sweep the major drama categories. It also became just the third show to complete a sweep of the major categories, following Angels in America as a limited series in 2004 and Schitt's Creek as a comedy in 2020. The Queen's Gambit became the first web series to win Outstanding Limited or Anthology Series. Netflix led all platforms with 44 wins, marking the first time it won more awards than any other network or platform and tying the record set by CBS in 1974 for the most wins by a network in a year. The fourth season of The Handmaid's Tale was nominated for 21 awards but did not win any, breaking Mad Men's record of 17 nomination losses in 2012 for the largest "shutout" in Emmys history.

For individual achievements, RuPaul became the most-awarded black individual in Emmys history with his win as a producer of RuPaul's Drag Race for Outstanding Competition Program. Michaela Coel became the first black woman to win for limited series writing for I May Destroy You. Jean Smart became the second woman to win Emmys for lead, supporting, and guest acting in comedies, after Betty White. Directing wins for Lucia Aniello and Jessica Hobbs marked the first time women won Emmys for comedy and drama directing in the same year.

While a record was set for diverse nominations and the ceremony featured many presenters of color, white individuals won all 12 major acting trophies. This led to the hashtag #EmmysSoWhite trending on Twitter, echoing #OscarsSoWhite from the 87th Academy Awards in 2015. For comparison, the previous year saw four black winners in the acting categories. In total, only three individuals of color spoke when accepting awards – RuPaul, Coel, and Debbie Allen – though there were other winners of color on producing and writing teams. The Creative Arts Emmys were more diverse, with three of the four guest acting winners being black and many people of color winning in technical categories, though those awards are considered less notable.

Winners are listed first, highlighted in boldface, and indicated with a double dagger (‡). (Note: The outlets listed for each program are the U.S. broadcasters or streaming services identified in the nominations, which for some international productions are different than the broadcaster(s) that originally commissioned the program.) For simplicity, producers who received nominations for program awards, as well as nominated writers for Outstanding Writing for a Variety Series, have been omitted.

=== Programs ===
Programs
**Outstanding Comedy Series**: **Ted Lasso (Apple TV+)**‡; Black-ish (ABC); Cobra Kai (Netflix); Emily in Paris (Netflix); The Flight Attendant (HBO Max); Hacks (HBO Max); The Kominsky Method (Netflix); PEN15 (Hulu)	**Outstanding Drama Series**: **The Crown (Netflix)**‡; The Boys (Prime Video); Bridgerton (Netflix); The Handmaid's Tale (Hulu); Lovecraft Country (HBO); The Mandalorian (Disney+); Pose (FX); This Is Us (NBC)
**Outstanding Limited or Anthology Series**: **The Queen's Gambit (Netflix)**‡; I May Destroy You (HBO); Mare of Easttown (HBO); The Underground Railroad (Prime Video); WandaVision (Disney+)	**Outstanding Competition Program**: **RuPaul's Drag Race (VH1)**‡; The Amazing Race (CBS); Nailed It! (Netflix); Top Chef (Bravo); The Voice (NBC)
**Outstanding Variety Talk Series**: **Last Week Tonight with John Oliver (HBO)**‡; Conan (TBS); The Daily Show with Trevor Noah (Comedy Central); Jimmy Kimmel Live! (ABC); The Late Show with Stephen Colbert (CBS)	**Outstanding Variety Sketch Series**: **Saturday Night Live (NBC)**‡; A Black Lady Sketch Show (HBO)
**Outstanding Variety Special (Live)**: **Stephen Colbert's Election Night 2020: Democracy's Last Stand Building Back America Great Again Better 2020 (Showtime)**‡; Celebrating America – An Inauguration Night Special (Multiple Platforms); The 63rd Annual Grammy Awards (CBS); The Oscars (ABC); The Pepsi Super Bowl LV Halftime Show Starring The Weeknd (CBS)	**Outstanding Variety Special (Pre-Recorded)**: **Hamilton (Disney+)**‡; Bo Burnham: Inside (Netflix); David Byrne's American Utopia (HBO); 8:46 – Dave Chappelle (Netflix); Friends: The Reunion (HBO Max); A West Wing Special to Benefit When We All Vote (HBO Max)

=== Acting ===
==== Lead performances ====
Lead performances
**Outstanding Lead Actor in a Comedy Series**: **Jason Sudeikis – Ted Lasso as Ted Lasso (Apple TV+)**‡; Anthony Anderson – Black-ish as Andre "Dre" Johnson (ABC); Michael Douglas – The Kominsky Method as Sandy Kominsky (Netflix); William H. Macy – Shameless as Frank Gallagher (Showtime); Kenan Thompson – Kenan as Kenan Williams (NBC)	**Outstanding Lead Actress in a Comedy Series**: **Jean Smart – Hacks as Deborah Vance (HBO Max)**‡; Aidy Bryant – Shrill as Annie Easton (Hulu); Kaley Cuoco – The Flight Attendant as Cassie Bowden (HBO Max); Allison Janney – Mom as Bonnie Plunkett (CBS); Tracee Ellis Ross – Black-ish as Rainbow Johnson (ABC)
**Outstanding Lead Actor in a Drama Series**: **Josh O'Connor – The Crown as Prince Charles (Netflix)**‡; Sterling K. Brown – This Is Us as Randall Pearson (NBC); Jonathan Majors – Lovecraft Country as Atticus Freeman (HBO); Regé-Jean Page – Bridgerton as Simon Basset (Netflix); Billy Porter – Pose as Pray Tell (FX); Matthew Rhys – Perry Mason as Perry Mason (HBO)	**Outstanding Lead Actress in a Drama Series**: **Olivia Colman – The Crown as Queen Elizabeth II (Netflix)**‡; Uzo Aduba – In Treatment as Dr. Brooke Taylor (HBO); Emma Corrin – The Crown as Princess Diana (Netflix); Elisabeth Moss – The Handmaid's Tale as June / Offred (Hulu); Michaela Jaé Rodriguez – Pose as Blanca Rodriguez (FX); Jurnee Smollett – Lovecraft Country as Letitia "Leti" Lewis (HBO)
**Outstanding Lead Actor in a Limited or Anthology Series or Movie**: **Ewan McGregor – Halston as Halston (Netflix)**‡; Paul Bettany – WandaVision as The Vision (Disney+); Hugh Grant – The Undoing as Jonathan Fraser (HBO); Lin-Manuel Miranda – Hamilton as Alexander Hamilton (Disney+); Leslie Odom Jr. – Hamilton as Aaron Burr (Disney+)	**Outstanding Lead Actress in a Limited or Anthology Series or Movie**: **Kate Winslet – Mare of Easttown as Mare Sheehan (HBO)**‡; Michaela Coel – I May Destroy You as Arabella (HBO); Cynthia Erivo – Genius: Aretha as Aretha Franklin (National Geographic); Elizabeth Olsen – WandaVision as Wanda Maximoff / Scarlet Witch (Disney+); Anya Taylor-Joy – The Queen's Gambit as Beth Harmon (Netflix)

==== Supporting performances ====
Supporting performances
**Outstanding Supporting Actor in a Comedy Series**: **Brett Goldstein – Ted Lasso as Roy Kent (Apple TV+)**‡; Carl Clemons-Hopkins – Hacks as Marcus Vaughan (HBO Max); Brendan Hunt – Ted Lasso as Coach Beard (Apple TV+); Nick Mohammed – Ted Lasso as Nathan Shelley (Apple TV+); Paul Reiser – The Kominsky Method as Martin (Netflix); Jeremy Swift – Ted Lasso as Higgins (Apple TV+); Kenan Thompson – Saturday Night Live as various characters (NBC); Bowen Yang – Saturday Night Live as various characters (NBC)	**Outstanding Supporting Actress in a Comedy Series**: **Hannah Waddingham – Ted Lasso as Rebecca Welton (Apple TV+)**‡; Aidy Bryant – Saturday Night Live as various characters (NBC); Hannah Einbinder – Hacks as Ava Daniels (HBO Max); Kate McKinnon – Saturday Night Live as various characters (NBC); Rosie Perez – The Flight Attendant as Megan Briscoe (HBO Max); Cecily Strong – Saturday Night Live as various characters (NBC); Juno Temple – Ted Lasso as Keeley Jones (Apple TV+)
**Outstanding Supporting Actor in a Drama Series**: **Tobias Menzies – The Crown as Prince Philip, Duke of Edinburgh (Netflix)**‡; Giancarlo Esposito – The Mandalorian as Moff Gideon (Disney+); O-T Fagbenle – The Handmaid's Tale as Luke (Hulu); John Lithgow – Perry Mason as E.B. Jonathan (HBO); Max Minghella – The Handmaid's Tale as Commander Nick Blaine (Hulu); Chris Sullivan – This Is Us as Toby Damon (NBC); Bradley Whitford – The Handmaid's Tale as Commander Joseph Lawrence (Hulu); Michael K. Williams – Lovecraft Country as Montrose Freeman (HBO) (posthumous) (Note: Williams died between the end of Emmy voting and the ceremony.)	**Outstanding Supporting Actress in a Drama Series**: **Gillian Anderson – The Crown as Margaret Thatcher (Netflix)**‡; Helena Bonham Carter – The Crown as Princess Margaret (Netflix); Madeline Brewer – The Handmaid's Tale as Janine (Hulu); Ann Dowd – The Handmaid's Tale as Aunt Lydia (Hulu); Aunjanue Ellis – Lovecraft Country as Hippolyta Freeman (HBO); Emerald Fennell – The Crown as Camilla Parker Bowles (Netflix); Yvonne Strahovski – The Handmaid's Tale as Serena Joy Waterford (Hulu); Samira Wiley – The Handmaid's Tale as Moira (Hulu)
**Outstanding Supporting Actor in a Limited or Anthology Series or Movie**: **Evan Peters – Mare of Easttown as Det. Colin Zabel (HBO)**‡; Thomas Brodie-Sangster – The Queen's Gambit as Benny Watts (Netflix); Daveed Diggs – Hamilton as Marquis de Lafayette / Thomas Jefferson (Disney+); Paapa Essiedu – I May Destroy You as Kwame (HBO); Jonathan Groff – Hamilton as King George (Disney+); Anthony Ramos – Hamilton as John Laurens / Philip Hamilton (Disney+)	**Outstanding Supporting Actress in a Limited or Anthology Series or Movie**: **Julianne Nicholson – Mare of Easttown as Lori Ross (HBO)**‡; Renée Elise Goldsberry – Hamilton as Angelica Schuyler (Disney+); Kathryn Hahn – WandaVision as Agatha Harkness / Agnes the Nosy Neighbor (Disney+); Moses Ingram – The Queen's Gambit as Jolene (Netflix); Jean Smart – Mare of Easttown as Helen (HBO); Phillipa Soo – Hamilton as Eliza Hamilton (Disney+)

=== Directing ===
Directing
**Outstanding Directing for a Comedy Series**: **Hacks: "There Is No Line" – Lucia Aniello (HBO Max)**‡; B Positive: "Pilot" – James Burrows (CBS); The Flight Attendant: "In Case of Emergency" – Susanna Fogel (HBO Max); Mom: "Scooby-Doo Checks and Salisbury Steak" – James Widdoes (CBS); Ted Lasso: "Biscuits" – Zach Braff (Apple TV+); Ted Lasso: "The Hope That Kills You" – MJ Delaney (Apple TV+); Ted Lasso: "Make Rebecca Great Again" – Declan Lowney (Apple TV+)	**Outstanding Directing for a Drama Series**: **The Crown: "War" – Jessica Hobbs (Netflix)**‡; Bridgerton: "Diamond of the First Water" – Julie Anne Robinson (Netflix); The Crown: "Fairytale" – Benjamin Caron (Netflix); The Handmaid's Tale: "The Wilderness" – Liz Garbus (Hulu); The Mandalorian: "Chapter 9: The Marshal" – Jon Favreau (Disney+); Pose: "Series Finale" – Steven Canals (FX)
**Outstanding Directing for a Limited or Anthology Series or Movie**: **The Queen's Gambit – Scott Frank (Netflix)**‡; Hamilton – Thomas Kail (Disney+); I May Destroy You: "Ego Death" – Sam Miller and Michaela Coel (HBO); I May Destroy You: "Eyes Eyes Eyes Eyes" – Sam Miller (HBO); Mare of Easttown – Craig Zobel (HBO); The Underground Railroad – Barry Jenkins (Prime Video); WandaVision – Matt Shakman (Disney+)

=== Writing ===
Writing
**Outstanding Writing for a Comedy Series**: **Hacks: "There Is No Line" – Lucia Aniello, Paul W. Downs, and Jen Statsky (HBO Max)**‡; The Flight Attendant: "In Case of Emergency" – Steve Yockey (HBO Max); Girls5eva: "Pilot" – Meredith Scardino (Peacock); PEN15: "Play" – Maya Erskine (Hulu); Ted Lasso: "Make Rebecca Great Again" – Jason Sudeikis, Brendan Hunt, and Joe Kelly (Apple TV+); Ted Lasso: "Pilot" – Jason Sudeikis, Bill Lawrence, Brendan Hunt, and Joe Kelly (Apple TV+)	**Outstanding Writing for a Drama Series**: **The Crown: "War" – Peter Morgan (Netflix)**‡; The Boys: "What I Know" – Rebecca Sonnenshine (Prime Video); The Handmaid's Tale: "Home" – Yahlin Chang (Hulu); Lovecraft Country: "Sundown" – Misha Green (HBO); The Mandalorian: "Chapter 13: The Jedi" – Dave Filoni (Disney+); The Mandalorian: "Chapter 16: The Rescue" – Jon Favreau (Disney+); Pose: "Series Finale" – Ryan Murphy, Brad Falchuk, Steven Canals, Janet Mock, and Our Lady J (FX)
**Outstanding Writing for a Limited or Anthology Series or Movie**: **I May Destroy You – Michaela Coel (HBO)**‡; Mare of Easttown – Brad Ingelsby (HBO); The Queen's Gambit – Scott Frank (Netflix); WandaVision: "All-New Halloween Spooktacular!" – Chuck Hayward and Peter Cameron (Disney+); WandaVision: "Filmed Before a Live Studio Audience" – Jac Schaeffer (Disney+); WandaVision: "Previously On" – Laura Donney (Disney+)	**Outstanding Writing for a Variety Series**: **Last Week Tonight with John Oliver (HBO)**‡; The Amber Ruffin Show (Peacock); A Black Lady Sketch Show (HBO); The Late Show with Stephen Colbert (CBS); Saturday Night Live (NBC)

=== Governors Award ===
The Governors Award was presented to Debbie Allen "in recognition of her numerous contributions to the television medium through multiple creative forms and her philanthropic endeavors around the world".

=== Nominations and wins by program ===
For the purposes of the lists below, "major" constitutes the categories listed above (program, acting, directing, and writing), while "total" includes the categories presented at the Creative Arts Emmy Awards.

Shows with multiple major nominations
Nominations	Show	Network
13	Ted Lasso	Apple TV+
11	The Crown	Netflix
11	The Handmaid's Tale	Hulu
9	Hamilton	Disney+
8	WandaVision	Disney+
7	Mare of Easttown	HBO
7	Saturday Night Live	NBC
6	Hacks	HBO Max
6	I May Destroy You	HBO
6	Lovecraft Country	HBO
6	The Queen's Gambit	Netflix
5	The Flight Attendant	HBO Max
5	The Mandalorian	Disney+
5	Pose	FX
3	Black-ish	ABC
3	Bridgerton	Netflix
3	The Kominsky Method	Netflix
3	This Is Us	NBC
2	A Black Lady Sketch Show	HBO
2	The Boys	Prime Video
2	Last Week Tonight with John Oliver	HBO
2	The Late Show with Stephen Colbert	CBS
2	Mom	CBS
2	PEN15	Hulu
2	Perry Mason	HBO
2	The Underground Railroad	Prime Video

Shows with five or more total nominations
Nominations	Show	Network
24	The Crown	Netflix
24	The Mandalorian	Disney+
23	WandaVision	Disney+
21	The Handmaid's Tale	Hulu
21	Saturday Night Live	NBC
20	Ted Lasso	Apple TV+
18	Lovecraft Country	HBO
18	The Queen's Gambit	Netflix
16	Mare of Easttown	HBO
15	Hacks	HBO Max
12	Bridgerton	Netflix
12	Hamilton	Disney+
9	The Flight Attendant	HBO Max
9	I May Destroy You	HBO
9	Pose	FX
9	RuPaul's Drag Race	VH1
7	Allen v. Farrow	HBO
7	Last Week Tonight with John Oliver	HBO
7	The Social Dilemma	Netflix
7	The Underground Railroad	Prime Video
7	The Voice	NBC
6	The Bee Gees: How Can You Mend a Broken Heart	HBO
6	Bo Burnham: Inside	Netflix
6	David Byrne's American Utopia	HBO
6	The Kominsky Method	Netflix
6	Queer Eye	Netflix
6	This Is Us	NBC
5	A Black Lady Sketch Show	HBO
5	Black-ish	ABC
5	The Boys	Prime Video
5	Dancing with the Stars	ABC
5	David Attenborough: A Life on Our Planet	Netflix
5	The Falcon and the Winter Soldier	Disney+
5	Halston	Netflix
5	The Late Show with Stephen Colbert	CBS
5	Top Chef	Bravo
5	Zoey's Extraordinary Playlist	NBC

Shows with multiple major wins
Wins	Show	Network
7	The Crown	Netflix
4	Ted Lasso	Apple TV+
3	Hacks	HBO Max
3	Mare of Easttown	HBO
2	Last Week Tonight with John Oliver	HBO
2	The Queen's Gambit	Netflix

Shows with multiple total wins
Wins	Show	Network
11	The Crown	Netflix
11	The Queen's Gambit	Netflix
8	Saturday Night Live	NBC
7	Ted Lasso	Apple TV+
7	The Mandalorian	Disney+
6	Love, Death & Robots	Netflix
5	RuPaul's Drag Race	VH1
4	Mare of Easttown	HBO
3	Bo Burnham: Inside	Netflix
3	David Attenborough: A Life on Our Planet	Netflix
3	Hacks	HBO Max
3	Last Week Tonight with John Oliver	HBO
3	Pose	FX
3	WandaVision	Disney+
2	David Byrne's American Utopia	HBO
2	Dolly Parton's Christmas on the Square	Netflix
2	Genndy Tartakovsky's Primal	Adult Swim
2	Hamilton	Disney+
2	I May Destroy You	HBO
2	Life Below Zero	National Geographic
2	Lovecraft Country	HBO
2	The Social Dilemma	Netflix

=== Nominations and wins by network ===
Networks with multiple major nominations
Nominations	Network
41	HBO / HBO Max (Note: Parent company WarnerMedia combined HBO and HBO Max as a single platform for the purposes of counting nominations.)
29	Netflix
22	Disney+
14	Hulu
13	Apple TV+
12	NBC
8	CBS
5	ABC
5	FX
4	Prime Video
2	Peacock
2	Showtime

Networks with five or more total nominations
Nominations	Network
130	HBO / HBO Max
129	Netflix
71	Disney+
46	NBC
35	Apple TV+
26	CBS
25	Hulu
23	ABC
19	Prime Video
16	FX
11	VH1
10	National Geographic
8	Quibi
7	Fox
6	Paramount+
6	Showtime
5	YouTube

Networks with multiple major wins
Wins	Network
10	Netflix
9	HBO / HBO Max
4	Apple TV+

Networks with multiple total wins
Wins	Network
44	Netflix
19	HBO / HBO Max
14	Disney+
10	Apple TV+
8	NBC
6	VH1
3	ABC
3	FX
2	Adult Swim
2	CNN
2	Fox
2	National Geographic
2	Showtime

== Presenters ==
The awards were presented by the following people:

Presenters at the ceremony
Name(s)	Role
Seth Rogen	Presented the award for Outstanding Supporting Actress in a Comedy Series
Yara Shahidi	Presented the award for Outstanding Supporting Actor in a Comedy Series
Billy Porter; Michaela Jaé Rodriguez	Presented the award for Outstanding Supporting Actress in a Limited or Anthology Series or Movie
Vanessa Lachey; Wilmer Valderrama	Presented the award for Outstanding Supporting Actor in a Limited or Anthology Series or Movie
Mindy Kaling	Presented the award for Outstanding Writing for a Drama Series
America Ferrera	Presented the award for Outstanding Directing for a Drama Series
Stephen Colbert	Presented the award for Outstanding Supporting Actress in a Drama Series
Kerry Washington	Presented the award for Outstanding Supporting Actor in a Drama Series
Sophia Bush; Daniel Dae Kim	Presented the award for Outstanding Writing for a Variety Series
Kaley Cuoco	Presented the award for Outstanding Variety Talk Series
Ken Jeong	Presented the award for Outstanding Variety Sketch Series
Dan Levy; Eugene Levy; Annie Murphy; Catherine O'Hara	Presented the awards for Outstanding Writing for a Comedy Series and Outstanding Directing for a Comedy Series
Bowen Yang	Presented the award for Outstanding Lead Actress in a Comedy Series
Jennifer Coolidge	Presented the award for Outstanding Lead Actor in a Comedy Series
Allyson Felix; Jessica Long	Presented the award for Outstanding Competition Program
Michael Douglas; Ava DuVernay; Ellen Pompeo; Jada Pinkett Smith	Presented the Governors Award to Debbie Allen
Paulina Alexis; Lane Factor; Sterlin Harjo; Devery Jacobs; D'Pharaoh Woon-A-Tai	Presented the award for Outstanding Directing for a Limited or Anthology Series or Movie
Patrick Stewart	Presented the award for Outstanding Writing for a Limited or Anthology Series or Movie
Beanie Feldstein; Sarah Paulson	Presented the award for Outstanding Lead Actress in a Limited or Anthology Series or Movie
Taraji P. Henson	Presented the award for Outstanding Lead Actor in a Limited or Anthology Series or Movie
Anthony Anderson; Tracee Ellis Ross	Presented the award for Outstanding Lead Actress in a Drama Series
Catherine Zeta-Jones	Presented the award for Outstanding Lead Actor in a Drama Series
Aidy Bryant	Presented the award for Outstanding Variety Special (Live)
Amy Poehler	Presented the award for Outstanding Variety Special (Pre-Recorded)
Uzo Aduba	Presented the In Memoriam segment
Awkwafina	Presented the award for Outstanding Comedy Series
Adrien Brody	Presented the award for Outstanding Drama Series
Angela Bassett	Presented the award for Outstanding Limited or Anthology Series

== Ceremony information ==
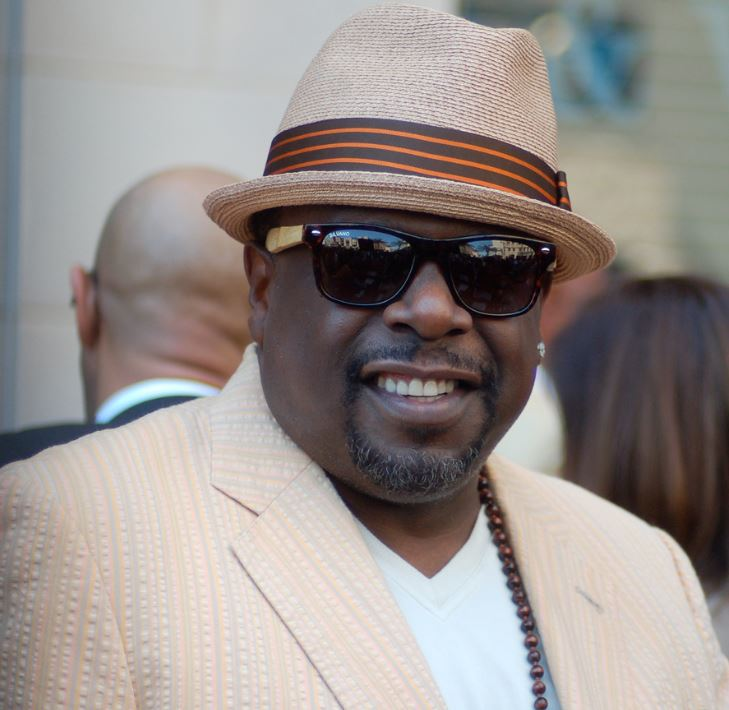
Cedric the Entertainer served as host for the ceremony

On March 2, 2021, the Academy of Television Arts & Sciences, also known as the Television Academy, announced that the 73rd Primetime Emmy Awards would be held on September 19. CBS broadcast the ceremony as part of a rotating deal among the "Big Four" networks (ABC, CBS, Fox, and NBC) signed in 2018. Additionally, it was announced that the ceremony would be available live and on-demand via ViacomCBS's streaming service Paramount+. Executive producers Reginald Hudlin and Ian Stewart returned after working on the previous year's ceremony, with Done and Dusted and Hudlin Entertainment producing. Hamish Hamilton also returned as director from the previous year. On July 12, Cedric the Entertainer, star of the CBS sitcom The Neighborhood, was announced as the ceremony's host. Reggie Watts served as the DJ for the ceremony, and MC Lyte was the show's announcer.

In an interview with Variety, Hudlin and Stewart explained that they aimed to make the ceremony a "celebration" after the events of the previous year. They also sought to create a "party environment" for the audience and viewers at home. Cedric voiced similar thoughts, remarking that "television got us through this last year" and seeking to honor that. The usual theater seating was not included; instead, nominees were seated at tables with food and drink available. According to Hudlin, he and Stewart had wanted to try such a setup for a while, and the ceremony offered a great opportunity for them to try it. For nominees who could not attend in person for logistical reasons or due to health concerns, remote sites were set up; for instance, the cast and crew members of The Crown attended together from a remote site in London.

=== Effects of COVID-19 pandemic ===
Due to the COVID-19 pandemic, the previous ceremony had been held as a virtual event with no in-person festivities. Jimmy Kimmel hosted the ceremony from Staples Center with no audience, while all nominees appeared remotely via video link. Initially, the Television Academy planned to return to a modified in-person ceremony at the Microsoft Theater. However, due to concerns over SARS-CoV-2 Delta variant and increasing infections in California, it was announced on August 10 that the Primetime Emmy Awards and Primetime Creative Arts Emmy Awards would be relocated to another L.A. Live venue, the indoor-outdoor Event Deck, and have a further reduction in attendance. The Event Deck had been used before as the site for the ceremony's Governors Ball afterparty, which was cancelled due to COVID-19 concerns. Attendees were asked to wear masks when not on camera and during commercial breaks.

When announcing the move to the Event Deck, the Television Academy explained that the change would allow the ceremony to "utilize an indoor/outdoor setting and more socially-distanced audience seating". However, presenter Seth Rogen criticized the tent-based setup during the ceremony, remarking, "What are we doing? They said this was outdoors. It is not. They lied to us". The comments, which were delivered off-script and partially tongue-in-cheek, led to criticism of the event on social media and reportedly frustrated producers Stewart and Hudlin. Cedric and Watts explained later in the ceremony the procedures that had been put in place to ensure a safe event. The Los Angeles County Department of Public Health also clarified that the ceremony was fully compliant with COVID-19 regulations for film, television, and music productions, which included proof of vaccination and a negative COVID-19 test within 48 hours of the event.

=== Category and rule changes ===
In December 2020, the Television Academy announced several rule changes for the 2021 ceremony, including merging the Outstanding Variety Talk Series and Outstanding Variety Sketch Series categories after previously splitting them in 2015. However, this decision was reversed in February 2021. Another rule change clarified that anthology series would compete in the limited series categories, which were renamed accordingly. In June, it was announced that acting nominees and winners could request that the gender-neutral term "performer" be used instead of "actor" or "actress" on their certificates and statuettes.

After trimming the number of categories at the main ceremony from 27 in 2019 to 23 in 2020, the Television Academy announced in July that the awards for Outstanding Writing for a Variety Series and Outstanding Variety Special (Pre-Recorded) would be moved to the main ceremony. In August, the awards for Outstanding Variety Sketch Series and Outstanding Variety Special (Live) were also added to the main ceremony. Other categories that had been presented at the main ceremony in previous years, such as Outstanding Television Movie and Outstanding Directing for a Variety Series, were kept at the Creative Arts ceremony.

=== Critical reviews and viewership ===
The broadcast generally received mixed to negative reviews. Mike Hale of The New York Times remarked that the ceremony had "a certain level of spirit in the room — you got the feeling people were having a good time... But it was an insular jollity, one that didn't really come through the screen". He also criticized the scripted portions and noted that the best parts were "more off the cuff". IndieWire's Ben Travers noted that the awards were "a traditional telecast" befitting CBS's light, safe programming and found that it lacked a "special sauce ... to distinguish it for anything good". He praised the stars of the evening but found the comedy and presentation poor, and he found the lack of diversity among the winners disappointing. Entertainment Weekly's Kristen Baldwin found that most of the jokes "didn't just fall flat — they cratered", while Rob Sheffield from Rolling Stone called it "one long coffin flop" that "decided to remind everyone what sucked about [award ceremonies]".

Some critics reviewed the broadcast more positively. Sonia Saraiya of Vanity Fair remarked that she generally enjoyed the ceremony and called it "a suave, sleek event", though she added that the lack of diversity among winners despite the diverse nominees and attendees "suggested that the Television Academy wants to be something different, but is still figuring out how". Robert Lloyd from the Los Angeles Times found the ceremony "fun, if nerve-racking" given the apparent disregard for COVID-19 protocols, singling out the pacing and energy for praise; he also applauded the diversity of the presenters. Several moments also received praise even from negative reviews, such as Michaela Coel's acceptance speech and Conan O'Brien "injecting a little anarchy into the proceedings" from the audience.

The ceremony was viewed by 7.83 million people in the United States, representing a 23% increase over the previous year's ceremony, which was the least-viewed in Emmys history at the time. It also achieved a 1.81 rating among adults ages 18–49, up from the previous year's 1.3 rating. The ratings figures only include those who watched the telecast on CBS, and not those who streamed it on Paramount+. Viewership numbers were the best since the 70th Primetime Emmy Awards in 2018, and the ceremony snapped a six-year streak of record-low viewership. Several publications remarked that the improved ratings were likely due to strong NFL broadcasts leading into the program.

== In Memoriam ==
The annual In Memoriam segment was presented by Uzo Aduba, and featured Leon Bridges and Jon Batiste performing Bridges' song "River".

- Larry King – TV host
- David L. Lander – actor
- Christopher Plummer – actor
- Willard Scott – weather presenter
- Dawn Wells – actor
- George Segal – actor
- William Link – writer
- Anne Beatts – writer
- Charlie Robinson – actor
- Ned Beatty – actor
- Billie Hayes – actor
- Michael Apted – director
- David Rodriguez – director
- Walter C. Miller – director
- Markie Post – actor
- Jamie Tarses – TV executive
- Herbert S. Schlosser – TV executive
- Lynn Stalmaster – casting director
- Roy Christopher – production designer
- Alex Trebek – game show host
- Yaphet Kotto – actor
- Hal Holbrook – actor
- Gavin MacLeod – actor
- Chuck Fries – producer
- William Blinn – writer
- Charlie Hauck – writer
- Jeremy Stevens – writer
- Richard Gilliland – actor
- Dustin Diamond – actor
- Sonny Fox – TV executive
- Dorothea G. Petrie – producer
- Allan Burns – writer
- John Sacret Young – writer
- Marc Wilmore – writer
- Norm Crosby – comedian
- Helen McCrory – actor
- Jackie Mason – comedian
- Charles Grodin – actor
- Conchata Ferrell – actor
- Olympia Dukakis – actor
- Jessica Walter – actor
- Cicely Tyson – actor
- Clarence Williams III – actor
- Ed Asner – actor
- Cloris Leachman – actor
- Paul Mooney – comedian
- Biz Markie – rapper
- Norm Macdonald – comedian
- Michael K. Williams – actor

In addition to the In Memoriam segment, several individuals were recognized elsewhere during the ceremony. Cedric the Entertainer opened the ceremony with a tribute to Markie with a television-themed version of the song "Just a Friend". Michael K. Williams, who had been considered a frontrunner for Outstanding Supporting Actor in a Drama Series, was recognized by presenter Kerry Washington when she presented the category. Jean Smart recognized her husband Gilliland during her acceptance speech, while Lorne Michaels and John Oliver paid tribute to Macdonald during their speeches.
