= Cellufun =

Social gaming community

- Cellufun Logo

- Cellufun Screenshot
- Website type: Mobile game, Mobile social network
- Available in: English, Chinese, Portuguese, Spanish, Italian, German, Russian
- Creators: Cary Torkelson; Arthur Goikhman; Stephen Dacek
- Website: cellufun.com

Cellufun, also known as Tylted, is a social gaming community available on mobile devices. Users can create avatars to represent themselves. It blends chat and a large catalog of social games.

Cellufun partners with mobile operators, mobile device makers, and media companies such as AT&T Mobility, Verizon Wireless, MetroPCS, Virgin Mobile, RIM, AOL, and USA Today to deliver branded entertainment and marketing.

== History ==
In February 2013, six years after the company's original venture financing round the Cellufun website and the Cellufun and Tylted brands were reacquired by two of its founders, Steve Dacek and Arthur Goikhman, who are operating the website under the Cellufun brand.

Based on Wall Street in New York City, the company was founded in 2005 by Cary Torkelson, Arthur Goikhman and Stephen Dacek. For several years, the company relied on advertising as its sole source of revenue. In mid-2009, Tylted added a new revenue stream by introducing a premium virtual currency called "FunCoins" to complement the existing "earned" point system called Cellupoints. Cellufun's community, as of July 2009, consisted of over 2 million registered users.

Cellufun hosts casino games, board games, and traditional social titles. Some of the chat sections are used for other things such as role-play.

Its Gulf Rescue game, designed to raise awareness about the Deepwater Horizon oil spill, donated a percentage of all virtual goods revenues to the Greater New Orleans Foundation.

== Awards ==
On February 14, Cellufun scored at the highest level of the Mobile Industry by being awarded a joint win in the "Best Mobile Game" category at the Global Mobile Awards 2008, held at the Mobile World Congress in Barcelona. Cellufun won for the multiplayer WAP game, Call of the Pharaoh, where players must work together to build a pyramid.
