= Launchball =

British physics-based online game

Launchball is a physics-based online game produced by the Science Museum in London, to coincide with the reopening in 2007 of their hands-on gallery 'Launchpad'.

The aim of the game is to get a ball from a starting position to a 'goal' by placing additional blocks onto the grid-based screen. Blocks include springs, slopes, magnets, lights, mirrors and so on.

Originally produced in Adobe Flash, the game was re-released in 2016 as a native HTML5 game, with support for touch and mobile devices.

The game has won numerous awards, including at SXSW 2008, where in the Interactive awards in won in the 'Games' category and the 'Best in Show' award. It has also won the Innovative and Overall award at the 2008 Museums and the Web awards, and was nominated for a 2008 Webby Award.
