= Jason Sudeikis =

American actor and comedian (born 1975)

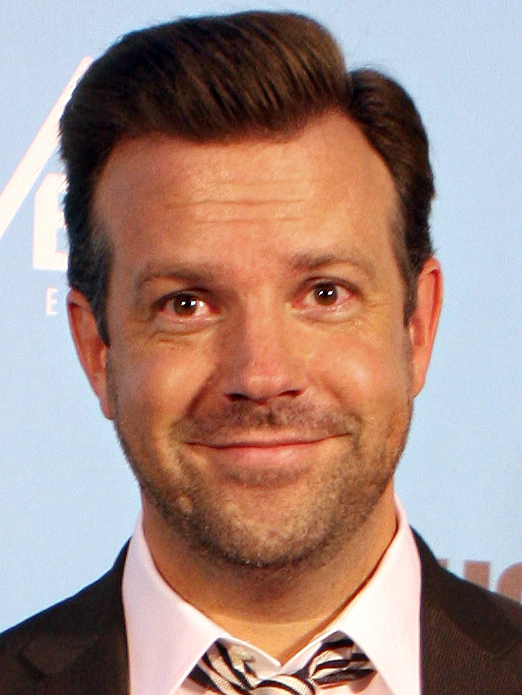
- Sudeikis in 2026
- Born: Daniel Jason Sudeikis; September 18, 1975 (age 51); Fairfax, Virginia, U.S.
- Occupations: Actor; comedian; writer
- Years active: 1997–present
- Spouse: Kay Cannon (m. 2004; div. 2010)
- Partner: Olivia Wilde (2011–2020)
- Children: 2
- Relatives: Tom Howard (great-grandfather); George Wendt (uncle)

Daniel Jason Sudeikis (/sʊˈdeɪkɪs/ suu-DAY-kiss; born September 18, 1975) is an American actor, comedian, and screenwriter. He is best known for his tenure as a writer and cast member for the NBC sketch comedy series Saturday Night Live from 2003 to 2013, in addition to co-creating and starring as the title role in the Apple TV sports comedy series Ted Lasso, which earned him two Golden Globe Awards and four Primetime Emmy Awards.

In the 1990s, he began his career in improv comedy and performed with ComedySportz, iO Chicago (Improv Olympic), and The Second City. After joining Saturday Night Live, Sudeikis progressed his television career with recurring roles in the comedy series 30 Rock (2007–2010), It's Always Sunny in Philadelphia (2010–2011), Eastbound and Down (2012), Portlandia (2011–2014), The Last Man on Earth (2015–2018), and Detroiters (2017–2018). He was also one of the leading cast members in adult animation series The Cleveland Show (2009–2013).

He had leading film roles in the comedies Hall Pass, Horrible Bosses (both 2011) and its sequel, Horrible Bosses 2 (2014), and We're the Millers (2013), as well as the acclaimed independent films Drinking Buddies (2013), Sleeping with Other People (2015), and Colossal (2016), and supporting roles in Going the Distance (2010), The Campaign (2012), Alexander Payne's Downsizing (2017) and Olivia Wilde's Booksmart (2019). He has also acted in voice roles for Epic (2013), The Angry Birds Movie (2016) and The Angry Birds Movie 2 (2019), Next Gen (2018), and Hitpig! (2024).

== Early life and education ==
Daniel Jason Sudeikis was born to Kathryn Sudeikis (née Wendt), a travel agent at Brennco and president of the American Society of Travel Agents, and Daniel Joseph Sudeikis. His father is of Irish and Lithuanian descent, while his mother has German and Irish ancestry. Through Kathryn, he is a nephew of actor George Wendt and a great-grandson of photographer Tom Howard.

Sudeikis was born with anosmia, leaving him with no sense of smell.

Sudeikis moved with his family to Overland Park within Johnson County, Kansas, which he has described as his hometown. He graduated from Shawnee Mission West High School in Overland Park and attended Fort Scott Community College on a basketball scholarship, but left before finishing.

== Career ==
=== Career beginnings ===
In the 1990s, Sudeikis began his career in improv comedy. He began performing at ComedySportz (now called Comedy City) in Kansas City, Missouri. He moved to Chicago, where he studied at the Annoyance Theatre in the North Side of Chicago and IO Theater (formerly known as ImprovOlympic) in the Near North Side and was one of the founding members of the long form team, J.T.S. Brown. He performed with Boom Chicago in Amsterdam, Netherlands.

Sudeikis was later cast in The Second City Touring Company. In the early 2000s, he became a founding member of The Second City Las Vegas, where he performed at the Flamingo.

=== Saturday Night Live ===
In 2003, while a regular performer at The Second City Las Vegas, Sudeikis was hired as a sketch writer for Saturday Night Live (SNL) after being recommended by his uncle George Wendt to Marci Klein. In May 2005, he became a featured player on the show, and was upgraded to repertory status at the beginning of the show's 32nd season on September 30, 2006. In July 2013, Sudeikis announced that he was leaving SNL. In 2015, 2016, and 2019 he made occasional appearances on the show. On October 23, 2021, Sudeikis made his hosting debut with musical guest Brandi Carlile.

Recurring characters

- George W. Bush, 43rd president of the United States.
- Joe Biden, 47th vice president of the United States and 46th president of the United States.
- Mitt Romney, 70th governor of Massachusetts and 2012 Republican Party nominee for president of the United States
- Male A-hole of the Two A-Holes with actress Kristen Wiig
- Ocean Billy, a parody of the 1980s singer Billy Ocean and his hit "Get Outta My Dreams, Get Into My Car"
- One half of the Bon Jovi "opposite band" Jon Bovi, appearing on Weekend Update (with Will Forte)
- Gil, a news anchor who treats his field correspondent Michelle Dison's (Kristen Wiig) misfortunes as amusement
- One of the guys from the "Song Memories" sketches who is the first to tell strange stories about where he was when he first heard a song
- Ed Mahoney, a brash man who often makes a fool of himself in public
- Officer Sikorsky, a police officer who brings in convict Lorenzo McIntosh (Kenan Thompson) in an attempt to "scare straight" the three delinquent teens (Bill Hader, Bobby Moynihan, Andy Samberg, and occasionally the week's guest host) that he often arrests
- Vance on "What Up with That?", an overzealous background dancer often dressed in an Adidas tracksuit with a 1980s perm
- DJ Supersoak, spoof on DJ Clay
- Pete Twinkle, ESPN Classic host of obscure women's sports with dim-witted Greg Stink (Will Forte) as his co-host
- Jeff, a disgruntled film and theatre technician who starts unprovoked arguments with the star of the piece
- The Devil, who often comes on Weekend Update to point out religious and moral hypocrisy on Earth
- Jack Rizzoli, an anchor at WXPD News who always tells veteran reporter Herb Welch (Bill Hader) to do his job
- Tommy, a strip club emcee for Bongo's Clown Room
- Sensei Mark Hoffman, the faculty adviser and Japanese Studies teacher to Jonathan Cavanaugh-san and Rebecca Stern-Markowitz-san (Taran Killam and Vanessa Bayer, respectively), hosts of "J-Pop America Fun Time Now"
- Marshall T. Boudreaux, host of the courtroom reality show Maine Justice

=== Film, television and other work ===
==== Early work ====
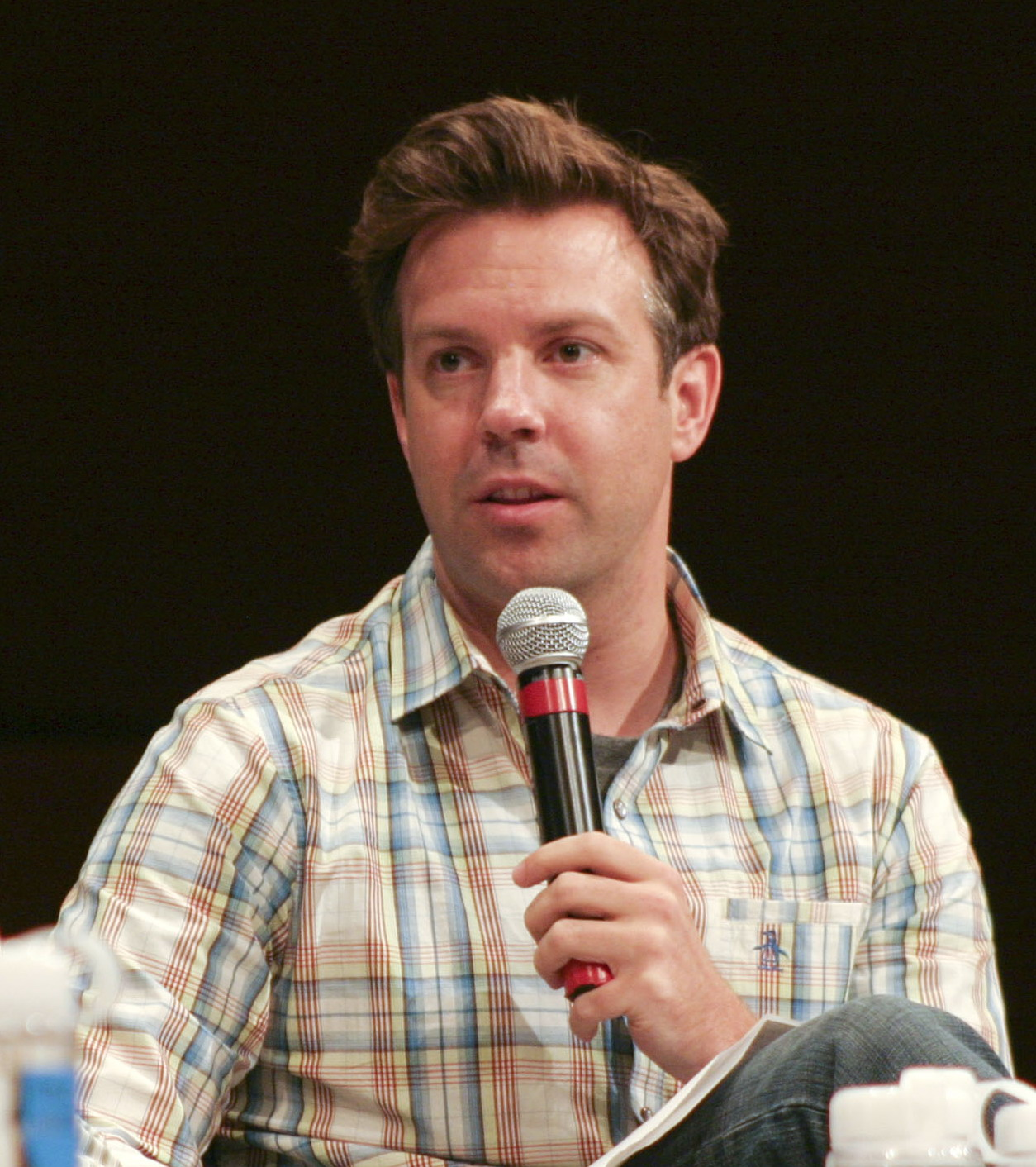
Sudeikis at the New York Television Festival, October 2009

Sudeikis had a recurring role on the series 30 Rock (2007–2010), appearing in a total of 12 episodes. He played Floyd DeBarber, a love interest of Tina Fey's character Liz Lemon. Sudeikis last appeared in four episodes towards the end of the show's fourth season in 2010.

Sudeikis began his film career with supporting roles in Watching the Detectives (2007), The Ten (2007), Meet Bill (2007), What Happens in Vegas (2008) and The Rocker (2008). He did voice work for the videogame Grand Theft Auto IV (2008), playing the role of right-wing radio host Richard Bastion. In July 2008, he co-starred with Bill Hader and Joe Lo Truglio in the web series The Line on Crackle. He had supporting roles in the movies The Bounty Hunter (2010) and Going the Distance (2010). On August 16, 2010, Sudeikis co-hosted WWE Raw with Going the Distance co-stars Charlie Day and Justin Long at the Staples Center in Los Angeles.

Sudeikis was a voice actor on the animated-comedy series The Cleveland Show (2009–2013). He provided the voices for Holt Richter, Cleveland's wannabe hipster neighbor, and Terry Kimple, Cleveland's hard-partying high school buddy, who now works with Cleveland at the cable company. After being credited as a recurring guest in season one, Sudeikis was bumped up to a series regular beginning in season two.

==== Film breakthrough ====
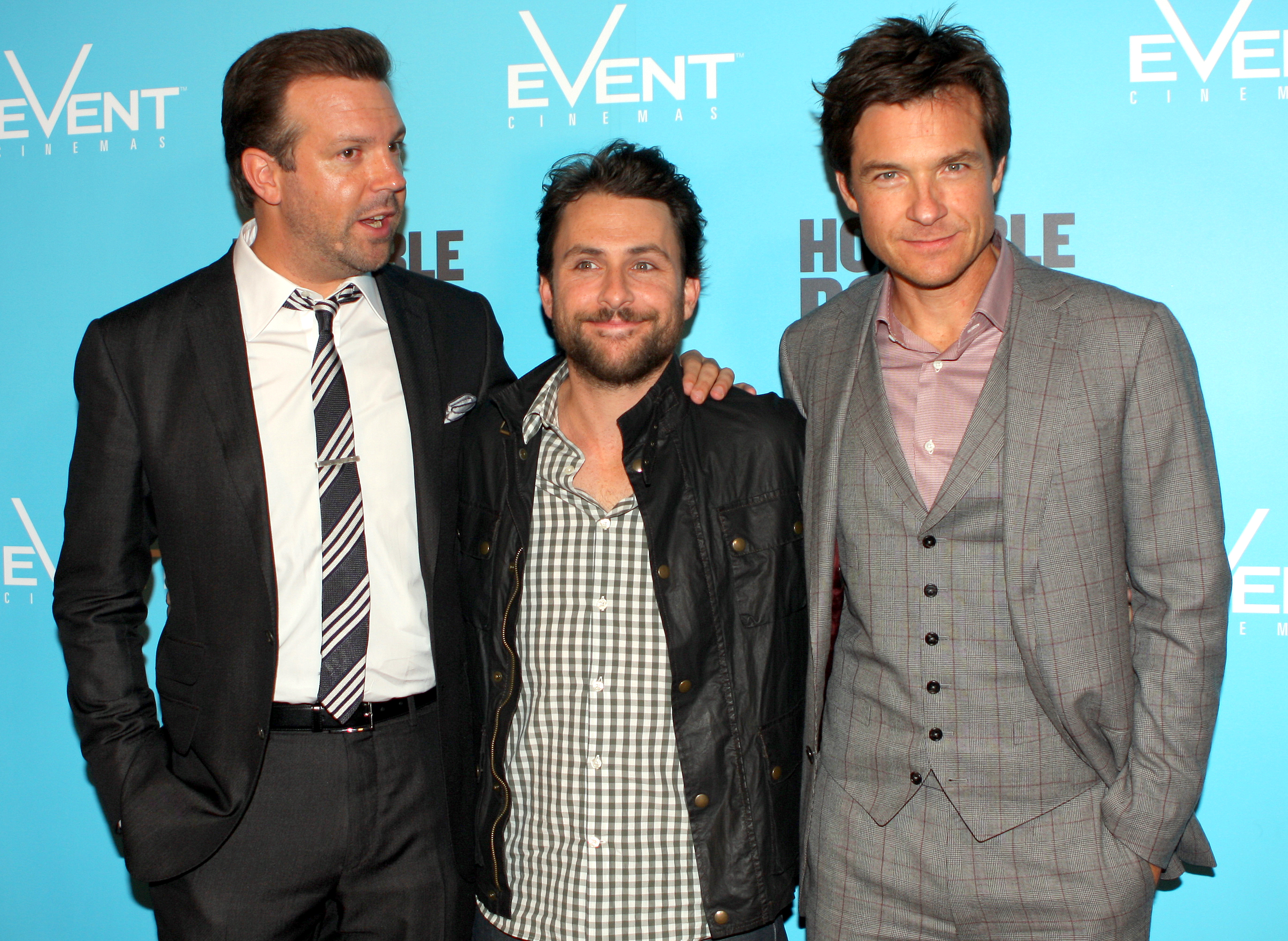
Sudeikis with Charlie Day and Jason Bateman at the premiere of Horrible Bosses, August 2011

In 2011, Sudeikis appeared in the Seth Gordon comedy Horrible Bosses. He had previously worked with co-star Charlie Day when he played the role of Schmitty on It's Always Sunny in Philadelphia and reprised the role on that show's seventh season finale. Sudeikis played his first lead film role in the Farrelly brothers comedy Hall Pass (2011).

Sudeikis hosted the 2011 MTV Movie Awards on June 5, 2011, at the Gibson Amphitheatre in Los Angeles. He was the voice for a line of advertisements of Applebee's which began running in 2012. He made appearances in six episodes on the series Eastbound & Down (2012–2013). He starred as David Clark, a drug dealer, in We're the Millers (2013), alongside Jennifer Aniston, Emma Roberts and Will Poulter. He reprised his role of Kurt Buckman in Horrible Bosses 2 (2014).

==== 2015–present ====
Sudeikis starred as Jake in the romantic-comedy film Sleeping with Other People (2015). He starred alongside Rebecca Hall in the romantic-drama film Tumbledown (2015). He voices the character of Red in the animated-comedy film The Angry Birds Movie (2016), based on the video game series of the same name. He starred alongside Anne Hathaway in Colossal (2016). He starred in Masterminds (2016). He portrayed Larry Snyder in Race (2016), Henry in The Book of Love (2016), and Bradley in Mother's Day (2016).

From November to December 2016, Sudeikis played the lead role of John Keating in the Classic Stage Company Off-Broadway production of Dead Poets Society. In 2017, he executive produced the comedy series Detroiters, and appeared in two episodes.

Sudeikis starred in Kodachrome (2017), alongside Ed Harris and Elizabeth Olsen. He made appearances as Glenn in Permission (2017) and as Dave Johnson in Downsizing (2017). He starred as a side-role/reference in the Derren Brown shows Derren Brown: Secret and Derren Brown Underground, where he performed on a screen during the credits, and his name was used as a reference during the show in 2017 and 2018.

Sudeikis starred in the thriller Driven. Sudeikis voices the character of Justin Pin in the animated action comedy film Next Gen. He played Red again in the 2019 animated-comedy The Angry Birds Movie 2. In 2019, he appeared on the Star Wars series The Mandalorian as a Speeder Bike trooper.

Sudeikis had portrayed Ted Lasso, a hapless American football coach brought to England to coach Coventry city fc as part of two promotional videos for NBC Sports in 2013 and 2014. In late 2019, Sudeikis co-wrote and starred in Ted Lasso about an American football coach who is hired to coach a fictional English football club, AFC Richmond. The series was released in August 2020 on Apple TV to a positive reception. It has earned him a Golden Globe Award and a Screen Actors Guild Award. At the 73rd Primetime Emmy Awards, he was nominated for and won Outstanding Comedy Series and Outstanding Lead Actor in a Comedy Series, and was nominated for Outstanding Writing for a Comedy Series. In 2021, he appeared on the Time 100 and Bloomberg's 50 Most Influential list. In 2023, Sudeikis said in an interview with The Guardian that the personality of the original main character was revised to be kinder because of the culture surrounding Donald Trump's presidency. After Ted Lasso was initially planned to end after its third season, a fourth season was announced by Sudeikis in March 2025.

On July 19, 2026, Sudeikis made an appearance at the 2026 FIFA World Cup Final Halftime Show. He introduced Justin Bieber while playing his character Ted Lasso.

== Charity work ==
Sudeikis played on basketball teams at the 2011 and 2016 NBA All-Star Celebrity Game.

He and other Kansas City celebrities have hosted the Big Slick for many years. The event raises money for the Cancer Center at Children's Mercy Hospital. As of 2023, the event had raised more than $21 million for the cause.

Sudeikis hosted the benefit concert Thundergong! at the Uptown Theater in Kansas City on November 3, 2018, for the charity foundation Steps of Faith which helps provide prosthetic legs and arms.

== Personal life ==
In June 2004, Sudeikis married American screenwriter Kay Cannon after five years together. The two were on The Second City Las Vegas cast together. They separated in 2008 and divorced in February 2010.

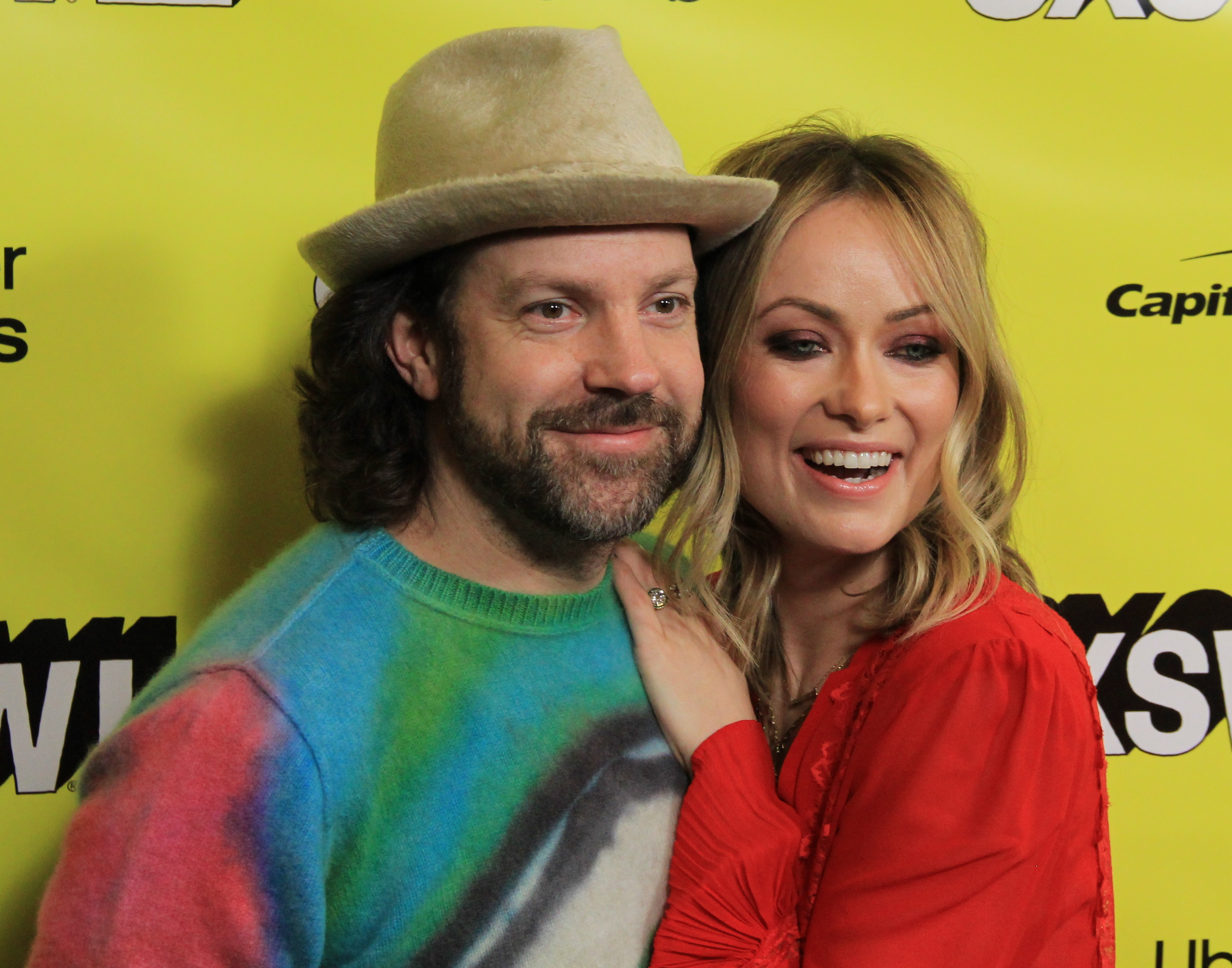
Sudeikis and Olivia Wilde at South by Southwest 2019

Sudeikis dated actress January Jones in 2010; People reported in January 2011 that they had split. He was in a relationship with American actress and filmmaker Olivia Wilde from 2011 to 2020, and became engaged in January 2013, but they did not marry. (Note: Following an unconfirmed claim, Wilde confirmed the following day.) They have a son, born in April 2014, and a daughter, born in October 2016. After their breakup, Wilde was publicly served with court documents regarding child custody while she was on stage presenting her film Don't Worry Darling at CinemaCon 2022. Additionally, Sudeikis and Wilde were both sued by their former nanny for wrongful termination.

Sudeikis is a WNBA fan and New York Liberty season ticket holder, as well as a Brooklyn Nets fan as he lives near the arena where both teams play. He is a supporter of Indiana Fever player Caitlin Clark. He has attended many of her college and professional games, even canceling a scheduled speaking appearance to attend a game.

== Acting credits ==
=== Film ===
Year	Title	Role	Notes
2007	The Ten	Tony Contiella	
2007	Watching the Detectives	Jonathan	
2007	Meet Bill	Jim Whittman	
2008	The Rocker	David Marshall	
2008	Semi-Pro	Nacho Fan	Cameo
2008	What Happens in Vegas	Mason	
2010	The Bounty Hunter	Stewart	
2010	Going the Distance	Box Saunders	
2011	Hall Pass	Fred Searing	
2011	A Good Old Fashioned Orgy	Eric Keppler	
2011	Horrible Bosses	Kurt Buckman	
2012	The Campaign	Mitch Wilson	
2013	Movie 43	Fake Batman	
2013	Drinking Buddies	Gene Dentler	
2013	Epic	Professor Bomba	Voice
2013	We're the Millers	David Clark / David Miller	
2014	Horrible Bosses 2	Kurt Buckman	
2015	Sleeping with Other People	Jake Harper	
2015	Tumbledown	Andrew McCabe	
2016	Race	Larry Snyder	
2016	Mother's Day	Bradley Barton	
2016	The Angry Birds Movie	Red	Voice
2016	Masterminds	Michael McKinney	
2016	The Book of Love	Henry	Also executive producer
2016	Colossal	Oscar	
2017	Permission	Glenn	
2017	Downsizing	Dave Johnson	
2017	Kodachrome	Matt Ryder	
2018	Driven	Jim Hoffman	
2018	Next Gen	Justin Pin/Ares	Voice
2019	Booksmart	Principal Jordan Brown	
2019	The Angry Birds Movie 2	Red	Voice
2021	South of Heaven	Jimmy Ray	
2023	Fool's Paradise	Lex Tanner	
2024	Hitpig!	Hitpig	Voice
2026	The Angry Birds Movie 3 †	Red	Voice

=== Television ===
Year	Title	Role	Notes
1997	Alien Avengers II	Chester	Television film
2003–2013	Saturday Night Live	Various	174 episodes; also writer
2007	Wainy Days	Handsome David	Episode: "Plugged"
2007–2010	30 Rock	Floyd DeBarber	12 episodes
2008	Childrens Hospital	Dr. Robert "Bobby" Fiscus	2 episodes
2008–2012	Saturday Night Live Weekend Update Thursday	Various	6 episodes
2009–2013	The Cleveland Show	Holt Ritcher, Terry Kimple (voices)	Main role
2010, 2011	It's Always Sunny in Philadelphia	Peter "Schmitty" Schmidt	2 episodes
2011, 2014	Portlandia	Aliki, Kim	2 episodes
2011	2011 MTV Movie Awards	Himself (host)	Television special
2012–2013	Eastbound & Down	Shane Gerald, Cole Gerald	6 episodes
2013	Robot Chicken	Badtz-Maru, Farmer Smurf (voices)	Episode: "Papercut to Aorta"
2014	Garfunkel and Oates	—N/a	Writer only; episode: "Third Member"
2015–2018	The Last Man on Earth	Mike Miller	Recurring role
2016	Great Minds with Dan Harmon	Thomas Edison	Episode: "Thomas Edison"
2016–2017	Son of Zorn	Zorn (voice)	Main role
2017, 2018	Detroiters	Carter Grant	2 episodes; also executive producer
2018	Sideswiped	Dr. David Bennett	Episode: "Matching Up"
2019	Double Dare	Himself	2 episodes
2019	SpongeBob SquarePants	Himself	Episode: "SpongeBob's Big Birthday Blowout"
2019	Ask the StoryBots	Roger the Plumber	Episode: "What Happens When You Flush the Toilet?"
2019	The Mandalorian	Biker Scout Trooper #1	Episode: "Chapter 8: Redemption"
2020	Tournament of Laughs	Himself	Host
2020	At Home with Amy Sedaris	Himself	Episode: "Travel"
2020	Scooby-Doo and Guess Who?	Himself (voice)	Episode: "Lost Soles of Jungle River!"
2020–present	Ted Lasso	Ted Lasso	Also co-creator, writer and executive producer
2021–2024	Hit Monkey	Bryce Fowler (né McHenry) (voice)	Main role
2021	Saturday Night Live	Himself (host)	Episode: "Jason Sudeikis/Brandi Carlile"
2026	2026 FIFA World Cup final halftime show	Ted Lasso	Guest appearance

=== Theatre ===
Year	Title	Role	Venues
2016	Dead Poets Society	John Keating	Classic Stage Company

=== Video games ===
Year	Title	Voice role	Notes
2008	Grand Theft Auto IV	Richard Bastion	Voice; WKTT talk radio co-cost
2022	FIFA 23	Ted Lasso	Voice and likeness
2026	Grand Theft Auto VI	Richard Bastion	Voice; WKTT talk radio co-host

=== Music videos ===
Year	Title	Artist	Ref.
2013	"Hopeless Wanderer"	Mumford & Sons	
2021	"Love Dies Young"	Foo Fighters	

== Awards and nominations ==
Organizations	Year	Category	Work	Result	Ref.
Critics' Choice Television Awards	2021	Best Actor in a Comedy Series	Ted Lasso (season one)	Won	
Critics' Choice Television Awards	2022	Best Actor in a Comedy Series	Ted Lasso (season two)	Won	
Golden Globe Awards	2021	Best Actor – Television Series Musical or Comedy	Ted Lasso (season one)	Won	
Golden Globe Awards	2022	Best Actor – Television Series Musical or Comedy	Ted Lasso (season two)	Won	
Golden Globe Awards	2024	Best Actor – Television Series Musical or Comedy	Ted Lasso (season three)	Nominated	
Golden Raspberry Awards	2014	Worst Screen Combo (shared with the entire cast)	Movie 43	Nominated	
HCA TV Awards	2021	Best Actor in a Streaming Series, Comedy	Ted Lasso (season one)	Won	
MTV Movie & TV Awards	2014	Best Comedic Performance	We're the Millers	Nominated	
MTV Movie & TV Awards	2015	#WTF Moment (with Charlie Day)	Horrible Bosses 2	Nominated	
MTV Movie & TV Awards	2021	Best Comedic Performance	Ted Lasso	Nominated	
Nickelodeon Kids' Choice Awards	2017	Most Wanted Pet	The Angry Birds Movie	Nominated	
People's Choice Awards	2014	Favorite Movie Duo (with Jennifer Aniston)	We're the Millers	Nominated	
Primetime Emmy Awards	2021	Outstanding Comedy Series	Ted Lasso (season one)	Won	
Primetime Emmy Awards	2021	Outstanding Lead Actor in a Comedy Series	Ted Lasso (episode: "Pilot")	Won	
Primetime Emmy Awards	2021	Outstanding Writing for a Comedy Series	Ted Lasso (episode: "Pilot")	Nominated	
Primetime Emmy Awards	2021	Outstanding Writing for a Comedy Series	Ted Lasso (episode: "Make Rebecca Great Again")	Nominated	
Primetime Emmy Awards	2022	Outstanding Comedy Series	Ted Lasso (season two)	Won	
Primetime Emmy Awards	2022	Outstanding Lead Actor in a Comedy Series	Ted Lasso (episode: "No Weddings and a Funeral")	Won	
Primetime Emmy Awards	2023	Outstanding Comedy Series	Ted Lasso (season three)	Nominated	
Primetime Emmy Awards	2023	Outstanding Lead Actor in a Comedy Series	Ted Lasso (episode: "So Long, Farewell")	Nominated	
Primetime Emmy Awards	2023	Outstanding Writing for a Comedy Series	Ted Lasso (episode: "So Long, Farewell")	Nominated	
Satellite Awards	2021	Best Actor in a Musical or Comedy Series	Ted Lasso	Nominated	
Screen Actors Guild Awards	2021	Outstanding Actor in a Comedy Series	Ted Lasso (season one)	Won	
Screen Actors Guild Awards	2021	Outstanding Ensemble in a Comedy Series	Ted Lasso (season one)	Nominated	
Screen Actors Guild Awards	2022	Outstanding Actor in a Comedy Series	Ted Lasso (season two)	Won	
Screen Actors Guild Awards	2022	Outstanding Ensemble in a Comedy Series	Ted Lasso (season two)	Won	
Screen Actors Guild Awards	2023	Outstanding Actor in a Comedy Series	Ted Lasso (season three)	Nominated	
Screen Actors Guild Awards	2023	Outstanding Ensemble in a Comedy Series	Ted Lasso (season three)	Nominated	
Teen Choice Awards	2014	Choice Hissy Fit	We're the Millers	Nominated	
Teen Choice Awards	2016	Choice Movie: Hissy Fit	The Angry Birds Movie	Nominated	
Writers Guild of America Awards	2021	Television: Comedy Series	Ted Lasso (season one)	Won	
Writers Guild of America Awards	2021	Television: New Series	Ted Lasso (season one)	Won	
Writers Guild of America Awards	2021	Television: Episodic Comedy	Ted Lasso (episode: "Pilot")	Nominated	
