= Open House (Abbott Elementary) =

- Abbott Elementary episode
- Episode no.: Season 1 Episode 10
- Directed by: Jennifer Celotta
- Written by: Brian Rubenstein
- Production code: T12.17160
- Original air date: March 22, 2022

Guest appearances
- William Stanford Davis as Mr. Johnson; Iyana Halley as Taylor Howard; Reggie Hayes as Denzel Collins

Episode chronology
← Previous "Step Class"	Next → "Desking"
- Abbott Elementary (season 1)

"Open House" is the tenth episode of the American sitcom television series Abbott Elementary. It was written by Brian Rubenstein and directed by Jennifer Celotta. It premiered on the American Broadcasting Company (ABC) in the United States on March 22, 2022. In the episode, Janine prepares to meet a student's mother during the school's open house, while the rest of the faculty relaxes. Gregory is surprised to learn how Ava got the principal job, and Barbara's daughter visits.

== Plot ==
While waiting for a student's mother at the school's open house, Janine (Quinta Brunson) becomes envious about Barbara's (Sheryl Lee Ralph) relationship with her daughter, Taylor. However, Barbara and Taylor argue over Taylor's career. Jacob (Chris Perfetti) secretly reveals he knows how to play poker during a game with Melissa (Lisa Ann Walter) and Mr. Johnson. Gregory (Tyler James Williams) goes into a slump after finding out Ava (Janelle James) was hired as principal instead of him, despite being unqualified, leading him to bond with Taylor. When Superintendent Collins visits the school, he reveals that he divorced his wife and married his mistress, eliminating Ava's leverage against him and putting her job at risk.

== Reception ==
Upon its initial broadcast on ABC, "Open House" was viewed by 2.64 million viewers, slightly less than previous episodes. This rating earned the episode a 0.8 in the 18-49 rating demographics on the Nielsen ratings scale. The episode achieved a total of 3.76 million viewers.

The episode aired following its mid-season entry in the 2021–22 television season. Filming for the tenth episode took place between August 16 and November 5, 2021, in Los Angeles, California, along with the rest of the season. Like other episodes, interior scenes were filmed at Warner Bros. Studios in Burbank, California. Exterior shots of the series were inspired by Vermont Elementary School in Los Angeles.
