= Abbott Elementary season 4 =

Season of television series

Abbott Elementary
- Season 4
- Promotional poster
- Showrunners: Justin Halpern; Patrick Schumacker
- Starring: Quinta Brunson; Tyler James Williams; Janelle James; Lisa Ann Walter; Chris Perfetti; William Stanford Davis; Sheryl Lee Ralph
- No. of episodes: 22

Release
- Original network: ABC
- Original release: October 9, 2024 – April 16, 2025

Season chronology
- ← Previous; Season 3 Next → Season 5

The fourth season of the American television comedy Abbott Elementary premiered on ABC on October 9, 2024, and concluded on April 16, 2025. The season consists of 22 episodes. Like the previous seasons, the season stars Quinta Brunson, Tyler James Williams, Janelle James, Lisa Ann Walter, Chris Perfetti, William Stanford Davis and Sheryl Lee Ralph.

Abbott Elementary is presented in a mockumentary format similar to one of The Office and Modern Family, and follows a documentary crew recording the lives of teachers working in underfunded schools including the fictional Willard R. Abbott Elementary School, a predominantly Black Philadelphia public school.

== Cast and characters ==
=== Main ===
- Quinta Brunson as Janine Teagues, a second-grade teacher at Abbott and hopes to improve the lives of her students by making the best of the poor situation the school district makes teachers work in. She currently dates Gregory.
- Tyler James Williams as Gregory Eddie, a first-grade teacher who was initially hired as a substitute replacement, and who is dating Janine.
- Janelle James as Ava Coleman, the school's tone-deaf principal who consistently bullies Janine and gives the staff reasons to believe she is poor at her job; a job in which she received after blackmailing the superintendent.
- Lisa Ann Walter as Melissa Schemmenti, a second-grade teacher at Abbott who has questionable connections with the Philly locals, but uses them to help the school.
- Chris Perfetti as Jacob Hill, an eighth-grade history teacher who tries his best to help Janine with her plans to improve Abbott.
- William Stanford Davis as Mr. Johnson, the school's janitor who is seen as lazy, but consistent with his job.
- Sheryl Lee Ralph as Barbara Howard, a religious kindergarten teacher, adamant about keeping with tradition, and a mother-figure whom Janine looks up to.

=== Recurring ===
- Matt Oberg as Miles Nathaniel, a PGA lawyer.
- Jerry Minor as Joseph Morton, a colleague of Jacob whom he shares a complicated relationship with.
- Zack Fox as Tariq Temple, Janine's ex-boyfriend who is now the president of the PTA.
- Raven Goodwin as Krystal, the parent of a former student in Barbara's class who is on the PTA.
- Matthew Law as O'Shon, an IT representative who arrives to Abbott
- Cree Summer as Rosalyn Inez, a librarian hired for Janine's library program who now works at the school.
- Pam Trotter as Dia, an admissions office worker at Abbott who is annoyed by Ava.
- Josh Segarra as Manny, the leader of a group of school district representatives for Philadelphia.
- Keith David as Frank Coleman, Ava's father.
- Mike O'Malley as Captain Robinson, the captain of the Philadelphia fire department who dates Melissa
- Taylor Garron as Tasha Hoffman, a teacher who dislikes Janine.
- Logan Carter as R.J. McCann, a student in Jacob's class who is disinterested with most of what the school has to offer
- Tatyana Ali as Crystal, a former sorority sister of Ava who is now the principal of another school.

=== Guest ===
- Ben Onyx Dowdy as Warren, an HR Employee who works at the district, and who dislikes Janine.
- Nikea Gamby-Turner as Chanae, a cafeteria custodian who works at the school.
- Langston Kerman as Darnell, the parent of a student in Gregory's class who grows jealous of Gregory's relationship with his son.
- Orlando Jones as Martin Eddie, Gregory's father.
- X Mayo as Lisa, Darnell's wife.
- Tyler Perez as Caleb Hill, Jacob's little brother
- Lauren Weedman as Kristen Marie Schemmenti, Melissa's sister
- Richard Brooks as Gerald, Barbara's husband
- Talia Shire as Teresa Schemmenti, Melissa and Kristen Marie's mother
- Eric André as Cedric, a new custodian sent to replace Mr. Johnson at Abbott.
- Shirley Jordan as Delisha Sloss, a member of Barbara's church.
- Sabrina Wu as Mx. Cassidy Geoffrey, a substitute teacher for Janine's class.
- Brandon Kyle Goodman as Richard Tyler Williams, a coworker of Crystal.
- Bruno Amato as Gary, Melissa's ex-boyfriend.
- Benjamin Norris as Simon, a school district employee who is dating Erika.
- Courtney Taylor as Erika, a friend of Janine who attempts to improve her social circle.
- Larry Owens as Zach, Jacob's ex-boyfriend.
- Matteo Lane as Wyatt, Zach's new boyfriend.
- Jaboukie Young-White as Elijah, a guy Jacob flirts with.
- Wayne Wilderson as Rick, an auditor from the district.
- Jim Rash as Thomas, a district auditor alongside Rick.
- Naté Jones as Amber, a parent of a student who previously dated Gregory.
- Jill Scott as herself, a singer whose godmother attends Barbara's church.
- June Diane Raphael as Elizabeth Washington, Chief Education Officer for the Philadelphia Board of Education.

Additionally, Charlie Day, Glenn Howerton, Rob McElhenney, Kaitlin Olson and Danny DeVito reprise their respective roles from It's Always Sunny in Philadelphia as Charlie Kelly, Dennis Reynolds, Ronald "Mac" McDonald, Dee Reynolds and Frank Reynolds in the ninth episode.

== Episodes ==
No. overall	No. in season	Title	Directed by	Written by	Original release date	Prod. code	U.S. viewers (millions)
50	1	"Back to School"	Randall Einhorn	Quinta Brunson	October 9, 2024	T12.19401	2.13
When construction of a nearby golf course causes issues and brings unprecedented new arrivals to the school, the teachers rally together to find out what they can do to improve the conditions they have been put in. Ava invites a Human Resources employee to the school when it becomes apparent that Janine and Gregory have been dating over the summer. However, Janine becomes resistant in telling everyone when they are put on the spot. Unbeknownst to them, everyone at the school, including students, have taken on the knowledge that the two of them are together.
51	2	"Ringworm"	Randall Einhorn	Brian Rubenstein	October 16, 2024	T12.19402	2.00
When Jacob discovers that a student in his class has ringworm, the other teachers isolate him and the entire second floor in fear of catching it. Gregory, who had previously made plans with Janine for that night, becomes weary and extremely anxious about the looming infection. This conflict causes brief strain in their relationship.
52	3	"Class Pet"	Matt Sohn	Jordan Temple	October 23, 2024	T12.19403	1.91
When the district gives the school money for class pets, each teacher receives a pet that they were able to specifically request, except for Melissa. Stuck with a Guinea Pig, Melissa is reluctant to having the pet but eventually comes around to it, even stealing it from the school. Meanwhile, an IT representative visits Abbott, who Barbara and Jacob find attractive. Ava, not fazed, is questioned by the rep when he realizes that the school is using computers that were not approved by the district.
53	4	"Costume Contest"	Randall Einhorn	Brittani Nichols	October 30, 2024	T12.19404	1.89
As Halloween arrives at Abbott, the faculty and students begin preparing for their annual costume contest. Gregory and Janine become frustrated when nobody understands their Jurassic Park themed couples-costume. Meanwhile, Barbara is forced to abandon her tradition of having the students bob for apples when parents and some students begin complaining that the event is unsanitary.
54	5	"Dad Fight"	Justin Tan	Ava Coleman	November 6, 2024	T12.19405	2.04
When the parent of a student in Gregory's class becomes jealous of his relationship with his son, he challenges Gregory to a fight. This worries Gregory, as he does not want to fight the dad, and instead wants to be the better man and call a truce for the sake of the student. Meanwhile, Melissa suffers a fall and is stubborn about going to the hospital, and Janine frets about Barbara not paying her back five dollars after letting her borrow the money.
55	6	"The Deli"	Patrick Schumacker	Kate Peterman	November 13, 2024	T12.19406	2.21
When Jacob learns that the deli across the street will be turned into a smoothie shop, he rallies the community in protest, but the other teachers aren't as on board. Elsewhere, Manny tells Ava she has been chosen to present advice to other principals, and Mr. Johnson mentors a student.
56	7	"Winter Show"	Randall Einhorn	Justin Tan	December 4, 2024	T12.19407	2.91
Barbara plans a Christmas show for the school, but decides to change the theme to include all of her students, much to the chagrin of the other teachers. Jacob's brother visits for the first time in three years, causing Jacob to feel insecure, and Melissa plans for her family dinner. Gregory meets Ava's father.
57	8	"Winter Break"	Randall Einhorn	Joya McCrory	December 4, 2024	T12.19408	2.59
Melissa hosts Christmas Eve dinner with her family, Jacob, and Barbara, and will not let anything get in her way of an excellent meal, even when there's a dead body upstairs. Elsewhere, Janine and Gregory settle in for their first Christmas Eve together, only for Ava to show up unannounced.
58	9	"Volunteers"	Randall Einhorn	Garrett Werner	January 8, 2025	T12.19409	3.76
The district sends a group of volunteers which turns out to be the "Paddy's Pub" gang. While at Abbott, Mac becomes Ava's assistant principal, and Dee helps in Janine's classroom and attempts to seduce Gregory. Jacob, Barbara and Melissa notice Charlie's illiteracy and Barbara teaches him how to read, and Frank helps with the garden. Note: This episode begins a crossover event that concludes on It's Always Sunny in Philadelphia season 17 episode 1.
59	10	"Testing"	Randall Keenan Winston	Morgan Murphy	January 15, 2025	T12.19410	2.85
Janine and Melissa issue a practice test for their students, and Janine's classroom underperforms. Jacob struggles to engage a disinterested student, attempting to fit him into multiple different clubs. The district sends a new custodian (Eric André) to train under Mr. Johnson. Meanwhile, the teachers fret about a potential bus strike in Philadelphia.
60	11	"Strike"	Jennifer Celotta	Riley Dufurrena	January 22, 2025	T12.19411	2.91
Due to the bus strike, many of the students are unable to make it to school, leading to the teachers switching to hybrid learning. Janine, eager for the bus strike to end so her students can learn the Solar System, tries to find ways to get her kids back in the classroom.
61	12	"Girard Creek"	Randall Einhorn	Chad Morton	January 29, 2025	T12.19412	2.63
The students and faculty are invited to attend a pre-grand opening of the Girard Creek Golf Club. After arriving and being swayed by their fancy leisure, the teachers soon uncover that the club is using them for clout, as a way of getting back at them for being blackmailed. Meanwhile, Barbara helps Gregory adapt to new eating habits, and Jacob continues to find ways to engage R.J., a disinterested student.
62	13	"The Science Fair"	Tyler James Williams	Brian Rubenstein	February 5, 2025	T12.19413	2.72
As the students work on their Science Fair projects, Janine, Melissa and Ava each mentor a student and get competitive trying to win. Jacob and Barbara are forced to be the judges alongside Mr. Morton and they each have very different standards. Ava is displeased when her father Frank's barbershop is revealed to be one of the Science Fair sponsors.
63	14	"District Budget Meeting"	Richie Edelson	Rebekka Pesqueira	February 12, 2025	T12.19414	2.72
At the annual budget meeting, with Abbott mostly set from blackmailing the golf course, and Manny telling Ava the School Board has set aside a significant amount due to her speech, the teachers prepare to ask her for extras. Jacob gets the idea for a counselor to come three days a week and directly asks the board for this. After seeing her rival Crystal and other schools get turned down, Ava publicly asks for the rest of Abbott's money to be split between the other schools. Crystal is thankful but also suspicious as Jacob mentioned Abbott doesn't need material things like the other schools. Manny later warns Ava the Board is furious and will be looking at Abbott closely. Meanwhile, a voice-note from Gregory leads to him telling Janine he loves her.
64	15	"100th Day of School"	Randall Einhorn	Lizzy Darrell	February 26, 2025	T12.19415	2.33
On the 100th day of school, the students put on a celebration and dress up as centenarians. Between them calling the teachers old, and Barbara's daughter announcing she's pregnant, Barbara stresses about getting older. Meanwhile, Jacob loses Melissa's guinea pig Sweet Cheeks, and they team up with Mr. Johnson to find him before the step team performance.
65	16	"Books"	Dime Davis	Jordan Temple	March 5, 2025	T12.19416	2.42
When a parent complains about a book in the library, it leads to a divide between the teachers and parents, forcing the library to be shut down. Elsewhere, Melissa finds out her ex-boyfriend Gary is getting married and must confront her feelings towards Captain Robinson, and Gregory looks for a second job.
66	17	"Karaoke"	Matthew Pexa	Brittani Nichols	March 12, 2025	T12.19417	2.52
Some of the teachers party at a karaoke bar after school. While there, Jacob runs into Zach, who is dating someone new. Gregory is forced to work his second job, leaving Janine by herself. Elsewhere, Ava and O'Shon have their first date, which tests their compatibility.
67	18	"Audit"	Jaime Eliezer Karas	Ava Coleman	March 19, 2025	T12.19418	2.46
Two auditors from the school district arrive when word gets out from Crystal that Abbott has been taking bribes from the golf course. Ava and the teachers band together to hide all of the contraband, only for them to get caught. Ava puts the blame on herself, forcing the district to relieve her of her duties as principal. Meanwhile, Barbara is asked to be the school's music teacher, which she decides to do permanently.
68	19	"Music Class"	Brittani Nichols	Kate Peterman	March 26, 2025	T12.19419	2.28
Barbara settles into her new role as Abbott's music teacher, but struggles to teach the way she intended. Jacob sits in on her classes, and helps her connect with the students. Gregory takes on the role of interim-principal. Meanwhile, Janine sets up an opportunity for Ava to regain her position as principal, however her successes with public speaking events prompts Ava to question her future.
69	20	"Ava Fest: Tokyo Drift"	Randall Einhorn	Justin Tan	April 2, 2025	T12.19420	2.33
With Abbott low on funds, the teachers put together a car wash to raise money for the school. However, after Janine insists that they only take donations, and Barbara refuses to take dirty money, Ava steps in and quickly puts together a festival for the school. Meanwhile, Dia believes that Gregory cannot handle the questions and concerns of parents during the open house, and his efforts to prove her wrong get complicated when he runs into familiar faces.
70	21	"Rally"	Claire Scanlon	Joya McCrory	April 9, 2025	T12.19421	2.48
Janine, Barbara, Melissa and Jacob go to the district to get Ava's job back by admitting they took the bribes from the golf course. The four teachers are suspended for a week and Ava remains fired. Gregory handles getting multiple substitutes for the week and convinces Miles the golf course lawyer that the student's golf club should be kept open for a tax break. The students find out what happened and plan a peaceful walkout in support of the teachers and Ava. The board arrives and is unmoved by the students and faculty. However, the combined support of Tariq, Krystal and the PTA, the local community, Frank and other business owners, Crystal and other principals, and even Miles, convince them to rescind the suspensions and reinstate Ava.
71	22	"Please Touch Museum"	Randall Einhorn	Riley Dufurrena & Garrett Werner	April 16, 2025	T12.19422	2.19
This year's field trip is to the Please Touch Museum. Gregory is nervous as his father Martin has agreed to be a chaperone and this is his first time meeting Janine. At first she tries to mimic his strict personality but her playful side comes out. Martin engages with the children, shocking Gregory. Martin explains Janine reminds him of Gregory's mother. O'Shon gives Ava some earrings she finds ugly but not wanting to hurt his feelings she pretends she likes them. She eventually admits it and O'Shon shows her some cheaper ones he almost bought that Ava likes. Jacob's eighth graders find the Museum boring and are disappointed this is their last field trip, until they are able to put on a play having the teachers imitate each other, scripted by the students.

== Production ==
=== Development ===
The series was renewed for a fourth season on February 10, 2024, three days after the third-season premiere. During the 2024 San Diego Comic-Con panel for the series, creator Quinta Brunson confirmed that the series would return to its 22-episode format following a brief break during the third season due to the 2023 Writers Guild of America strike. Additionally, it was confirmed that the series would feature a crossover episode with another series, with the series later confirmed to be It's Always Sunny in Philadelphia.

On January 8, 2025, it was announced that Abbott Elementary would suspend production due to the wildfires in the Southern California region, where the show is filmed; production resumed on January 13.

== Reception ==
=== Ratings ===
The season premiered on October 9, 2024, following The Golden Bachelorette. The series moved to its new time slot of Wednesday nights at 9:30 p.m. ET/PT.

Viewership and ratings per episode of Abbott Elementary season 4
No.	Title	Air date	Timeslot (ET)	Rating/share (18–49)	Viewers (millions)	DVR (18–49)	DVR viewers (millions)	Total (18–49)	Total viewers (millions)	Ref.
1	"Back to School"	October 9, 2024	Wednesday 9:30 p.m.	0.37/4	2.13	—N/a	—N/a	—N/a	—N/a	
2	"Ringworm"	October 16, 2024	Wednesday 9:30 p.m.	0.29/4	2.00	0.30	1.29	0.58	3.29	
3	"Class Pet"	October 23, 2024	Wednesday 9:30 p.m.	0.28/3	1.91	0.23	1.11	0.50	3.02	
4	"Costume Contest"	October 30, 2024	Wednesday 9:30 p.m.	0.26/3	1.89	0.24	1.12	0.50	3.01	
5	"Dad Fight"	November 6, 2024	Wednesday 9:30 p.m.	0.28/3	2.04	0.25	1.21	0.53	3.24	
6	"The Deli"	November 13, 2024	Wednesday 9:30 p.m.	0.34/4	2.21	0.23	1.13	0.57	3.34	
7	"Winter Show"	December 4, 2024	Wednesday 8:00 p.m.	0.41/6	2.91	0.22	0.92	0.64	3.84	
8	"Winter Break"	December 4, 2024	Wednesday 8:30 p.m.	0.39/5	2.59	0.21	0.95	0.60	3.55	
9	"Volunteers"	January 8, 2025	Wednesday 8:30 p.m.	0.68/8	3.76	0.16	0.80	0.83	4.57	
10	"Testing"	January 15, 2025	Wednesday 8:50 p.m.	0.34/4	2.85	0.26	1.18	0.60	4.03	
11	"Strike"	January 22, 2025	Wednesday 8:30 p.m.	0.41/5	2.91	0.28	1.18	0.69	3.99	
12	"Girard Creek"	January 29, 2025	Wednesday 8:30 p.m.	0.34/5	2.63	0.20	0.96	0.56	3.62	
13	"The Science Fair"	February 5, 2025	Wednesday 8:30 p.m.	0.38/5	2.72	0.26	1.09	0.64	3.81	
14	"District Budget Meeting"	February 12, 2025	Wednesday 8:30 p.m.	0.35/4	2.72	0.24	1.00	0.58	3.71	
15	"100th Day of School"	February 26, 2025	Wednesday 8:30 p.m.	0.32/4	2.33	0.24	1.19	0.57	3.53	
16	"Books"	March 5, 2025	Wednesday 8:30 p.m.	0.33/4	2.42	0.29	1.15	0.62	3.57	
17	"Karaoke"	March 12, 2025	Wednesday 8:30 p.m.	0.31/4	2.52	0.27	1.10	0.57	3.63	
18	"Audit"	March 19, 2025	Wednesday 8:30 p.m.	0.34/5	2.46	0.22	0.99	0.56	3.46	
19	"Music Class"	March 26, 2025	Wednesday 8:30 p.m.	0.34/5	2.28	0.23	1.00	0.57	3.28	
20	"Ava Fest: Tokyo Drift"	April 2, 2025	Wednesday 8:30 p.m.	0.36/5	2.33	0.20	1.06	0.57	3.39	
21	"Rally"	April 9, 2025	Wednesday 8:30 p.m.	0.37/5	2.48	0.21	0.99	0.58	3.49	
22	"Please Touch Museum"	April 16, 2025	Wednesday 8:30 p.m.	0.30/4	2.19	0.20	0.95	0.51	3.15	
