= Fire (Abbott Elementary) =

- Abbott Elementary episode
- Episode no.: Season 2 Episode 15
- Directed by: Jennifer Celotta
- Written by: Ava Coleman
- Production code: T11.10144
- Original air date: February 15, 2023

Guest appearances
- Mike O'Malley as Captain Robinson; Shalita Grant as Miss Janet

Episode chronology
← Previous "Valentine's Day"	Next → "Teacher Conference"
- Abbott Elementary (season 2)

"Fire" is the fifteenth episode of the second season and the twenty-eighth episode overall of the American sitcom television series Abbott Elementary. It was written by Ava Coleman (Note: A writer coincidentally of the same name as the show's fictional character Ava Coleman, not the fictional character herself.), and was directed by Jennifer Celotta. It premiered on the American Broadcasting Company (ABC) in the United States on February 15, 2023.

Sheryl Lee Ralph submitted this episode for her consideration due to her nomination for the Primetime Emmy Award for Outstanding Supporting Actress in a Comedy Series at the 75th Primetime Emmy Awards.

== Plot ==
When a small fire breaks out in the teachers lounge, school principal Ava Coleman (Janelle James) rushes out of the school in a panic, abandoning everyone there. First grade teacher Gregory Eddie (Tyler James Williams) steps in as acting-principal and invites a district therapist to speak with the students and teachers. After speaking with every teacher, the therapist suggests to Gregory that Barbara Howard (Sheryl Lee Ralph) is struggling to process the fire, as she's the one who accidentally started it with her candle.

Later, when a fire marshal arrives, he instructs a fire safety meeting, to which he bans open flames on school grounds after the teachers refuse to take him seriously. Barbara takes offense to the demand and goes off on the marshal, noting all of the careless things other teachers at the school have done without consequences. After being reconciled by Melissa Schemmenti (Lisa Ann Walter), Barbara reveals that her husband Gerald had a health scare not long before the fire; and while he is currently fine, the fire struck a nerve and caused Barbara to break. The therapist advises Barbara see a therapist and take a day off from work.

Elsewhere, Melissa lives out her childhood dream as a firefighter, much to the boredom of her students and annoyance of the fire crew. Jacob Hill (Chris Perfetti) brings carrot cookies to school, however no one eats them as they are visually unappealing. Melissa later eats one out of curiosity away from Jacob, and finds out they are delicious.

== Reception ==
Upon its initial broadcast on ABC, "Fire" was viewed by a total of 2.76 million viewers, and 0.5 rating share among households 18–49. The episode premiered on February 15, 2023. A teaser for the episode was released onto the series’ social media accounts the day prior to the premiere. Filming for the episode took place after July 18, 2022, and before February 2023. Like the other episodes, the interior scenes of the series are filmed at Warner Bros. Studios, Burbank in Burbank, California, with exterior shots of the series being filmed in front of Vermont Elementary School in Los Angeles.

Ralph was an honorable mention for "TVLine Performer of the Week" for the episode, with the authors giving praise to her performance and stating, "This week’s Abbott Elementary gave Emmy Award winner Sheryl Lee Ralph another chance to show off her impressive comedy chops. - Ralph brought the typically composed teacher to the brink, delivering increasingly hilarious and ridiculous declarations with determined energy ("I never listen to Chaka Khan's 'Through the Fire' when it comes up on my Pandora. I'm every woman, not a pyromaniac")."
