= Abbott Elementary season 2 =

Season of television series

Abbott Elementary
- Season 2
- DVD cover
- Showrunners: Patrick Schumacker; Justin Halpern
- Starring: Quinta Brunson; Tyler James Williams; Janelle James; Lisa Ann Walter; Chris Perfetti; William Stanford Davis; Sheryl Lee Ralph
- No. of episodes: 22

Release
- Original network: ABC
- Original release: September 21, 2022 – April 19, 2023

Season chronology
- ← Previous; Season 1 Next → Season 3

The second season of the American television comedy Abbott Elementary created by Quinta Brunson premiered in the United States on ABC on September 21, 2022, and concluded on April 19, 2023. The season consists of twenty-two episodes. Like the first, the season stars Brunson, Tyler James Williams, Janelle James, Lisa Ann Walter, Chris Perfetti, and Sheryl Lee Ralph. William Stanford Davis is upped to a series regular this season joining the main cast.

Abbott Elementary is presented in a mockumentary format similar to one of The Office and Parks and Recreation, and follows a documentary crew recording the lives of teachers working at the fictional Willard R. Abbott Elementary School, an underfunded, predominantly Black Philadelphia public school.

Like the first season, the season was widely praised by critics and audiences alike with universal acclaim. The season currently holds a 100% approval rating on Rotten Tomatoes. The success of the series led to a renewal by ABC for a third season in January 2023.

== Cast and characters ==
=== Main ===
- Quinta Brunson as Janine Teagues, a second-grade teacher at Abbott and hopes to improve the lives of her students by making the best of the poor situation the school district makes teachers work in.
- Tyler James Williams as Gregory Eddie, a substitute for a recently fired first-grade teacher who quickly harbors a crush on Janine.
- Janelle James as Ava Coleman, the school's tone-deaf principal who consistently bullies Janine and gives the staff reasons to believe she is poor at her job; a job in which she received after blackmailing the superintendent.
- Lisa Ann Walter as Melissa Schemmenti, a second-grade teacher at Abbott who has questionable connections with the Philly locals, but uses them to help the school.
- Chris Perfetti as Jacob Hill, an eighth-grade history teacher who tries his best to help Janine with her plans to improve Abbott.
- William Stanford Davis as Mr. Johnson, the school's janitor who is seen as lazy, but consistent with his job.
- Sheryl Lee Ralph as Barbara Howard, a religious kindergarten teacher, adamant about keeping with tradition, and a mother-figure whom Janine looks up to.

=== Recurring ===
- Zack Fox as Tariq Temple, Janine's now ex-boyfriend who moves to New York in hopes of making a name for himself.
- Kate Peterman as Tina Schwartz, a teacher formerly employed by Abbott who now works at Addington Elementary, a charter school who rivals Abbott.
- Nikea Gamby-Turner as Chanae, a cafeteria custodian for the school.
- Lauren Weedman as Kristen Marie Schemmenti, Melissa's emotionally distant sister who works at Addington.
- Keyla Monterroso Mejia as Ashley Garcia, a teachers aide hired by the district for Melissa.
- Zakai Biagas Bey as Clarence, a student of Jacob.
- Courtney Taylor as Erika, a friend of Janine who attempts to improve her social circle, and also becomes one of the first to know of Gregory's crush.
- Naté Jones as Amber, a parent of a student in Gregory's class who dates him for a brief period.
- Jerry Minor as Mr. Morton, a colleague of Jacob whom he shares a complicated relationship with.
- Vince Staples as Maurice, a friend of Gregory who dates Janine after meeting her at a hookah bar

=== Guest ===
- Gritty as himself, the mascot of the Philadelphia Flyers who Janine hired for a mixer.
- Lela Hoffmeister as Courtney Pierce, a student at Abbott who is favorited by Ava.
- Leslie Odom Jr. as Draemond Winding, the owner of Legendary Charters who plans to turn Abbott into a charter school.
- Raven Goodwin as Krystal, the parent of a student in Barbara's class.
- Taylor Garron as Tasha Hoffman, a teacher who dislikes Janine.
- Larry Owens as Zach, Jacob's boyfriend.
- Andre Iguodala as himself, a professional basketball player and Ava's boyfriend.
- Blaiz Bahsi Baker as Mya Okafor, a student of Melissa who struggles to read.
- Orlando Jones as Martin Eddie, Gregory's father.
- Shirley Jordan as Delisha Sloss, a member of Barbara's church.
- Ayo Edebiri as Ayesha Teagues, Janine's distant sister.
- Mike O'Malley as Captain Robinson, the captain of the Philadelphia fire department who visits Abbott.
- Shalita Grant as Miss Janet, a counselor sent to Abbott after a small fire breaks out.
- Shwayze as Gabe, a representative from the Philadelphia Mural Arts.
- June Diane Raphael as Elizabeth Washington, Chief Education Officer for the Philadelphia Board of Education, who visits Abbott to document an award ceremony.
- Brandi Denise as Cassandra O'Neil, the parent of a difficult student in Janine's class.
- Taraji P. Henson as Vanetta Teagues, Janine and Ayesha's troubled mother.
- Hillary Anne Matthews as Docent, a tour guide at the Franklin Institute.

Additionally, Reggie Conquest appears as Devon, Ambrit Millhouse reprises her season one role as Alley Williams, Zach Evans, Maise Klompos and James III appear as Tyrone, Megan and Harold, Bella-Rose Love appears as Trinity, Kingston Covington appears as Raheem, Chinedu Unaka appears as Tristan, Bruno Amato reprises his season one role as Gary, Carolyn Gilroy appears as Summer, Maggie Carney appears as Dawn Nichols, Darryl Lee-Canyon appears as Darrell, Nicole Dele appears as Ms. Pinkey, and Christian Crosby appears as himself.

== Episodes ==
No. overall	No. in season	Title	Directed by	Written by	Original release date	Prod. code	U.S. viewers (millions)
14	1	"Development Day"	Randall Einhorn	Quinta Brunson	September 21, 2022	T12.17551	2.92
While preparing for the new school year, Janine arranges an assortment of activities but her plans go awry. At the same time, she is facing danger of eviction and debt as a result of her break-up with Tariq. Meanwhile, Barbara helps Gregory plan his class for the school year, while she awaits a new student who uses a wheelchair. When classes get combined due to a teacher shortage, Melissa receives ten third-grade students in her second-grade class.
15	2	"Wrong Delivery"	Randall Einhorn	Brian Rubenstein	September 28, 2022	T12.17552	2.54
After a box full of new books is mistakenly delivered to Abbott, the teachers return it to Addington Elementary, a charter school that boasts a high-tech facility. Envious, Janine hopes to secure the remaining grant money to buy a computer for the school. Ava hosts a Shark Tank-style pitch meeting where the staff can propose what the school should do with the grant money from the school board, to which Janine wins. However, following a mice infestation, the grant money is instead spent on an exterminator service. Gregory contemplates how to break his relationship with Taylor off without hurting her or Barbara.
16	3	"Story Samurai"	Jay Karas	Jordan Temple	October 5, 2022	T12.17553	2.63
The Story Samurai, an improv group, is performing at Abbott Elementary, but the staff and students find them corny. Jacob, who used to be in the group, is invited to perform with them, but Janine attempts to convince him otherwise, fearing he will be mocked. Elsewhere, Melissa is struggling to handle her combined class of second and third graders. Adamant she has control over the situation, she later admits she needs help and Ava gets her an aide.
17	4	"Principal's Office"	Shahrzad Davani	Brittani Nichols	October 12, 2022	T12.17554	2.63
Gregory takes Jacob's advice to send a disruptive student to Ava, but he learns that Ava does not discipline the child and must find a way to regain control of the class on his own. After Melissa offers to help her learn how to cook, Janine attempts to mend her relationship with her sister.
18	5	"Juice"	Jay Karas	Ava Coleman	October 19, 2022	T12.17555	2.54
Janine convinces the school cafeteria to replace their juice with a healthier option despite Barbara's disapproval, but it causes the students to use the bathroom often. Frequent bathroom use causes the plumbing system to break down, and Barbara gets angry when Janine and Gregory attempt to have their students use her classroom's private bathroom. Melissa clashes with her new aide, Ashley, who brings more disruption than help to the classroom.
19	6	"Candy Zombies"	Shahrzad Davani	Kate Peterman	October 26, 2022	T12.17556	2.88
During a thunderstorm, Abbott celebrates Halloween. Ashley fails to watch over the candy and a student dressed as Thanos takes every bag and distributes it to the entire school. In the chaos of students high on sugar, the staff work together to find the student. Janine is invited to a Halloween party by Erika, an old friend, and reveals to Barbara and Melissa that she has no outside-of-work friends following her break-up with Tariq. Gregory is asked out by Amber, and he accepts. A student dresses up as Mr. Johnson, while he himself messes with Jacob, who believes the ghost of the old school janitor lives in the basement.
20	7	"Attack Ad"	Matt Sohn	Justin Tan	November 2, 2022	T12.17557	2.66
An ad created by a charter school puts Abbott and the teachers in a negative light, leading to students transferring. The person behind the ad turns out to be Draemond Winding, who previously attended Abbott, as a student of Barbara from the first year she taught. Elsewhere, Janine packs up Tariq's remaining items in her apartment, and she considers the future of their relationship.
21	8	"Egg Drop"	Randall Einhorn	Joya McCrory	November 16, 2022	T12.17558	2.66
A teacher for an eighth grade class conducts an egg drop to demonstrate physics, and Janine wants her second graders to be involved. When her kids get upset about the eggs cracking, Gregory helps Janine figure out a different way to include the students. Elsewhere, Barbara is disturbed by a parent's revealing outfits and realizes her judgements after a chat with Ava.
22	9	"Sick Day"	Randall Einhorn	Riley Dufurrena	November 30, 2022	T12.17559	2.56
When Janine calls in sick for having food poisoning, Ava steps in for her classroom; which proves difficult when she refuses to follow her lesson plan. Elsewhere, Melissa and Barbara invite a teacher who typically avoids Janine to lunch, while Jacob is offended how the other teachers do not respect Janine.
23	10	"Holiday Hookah"	Randall Einhorn	Brian Rubenstein	December 7, 2022	T12.17560	2.63
On the last day before winter break, Janine is invited to a hookah club by Erika and unexpectedly runs into Gregory and Ava. After dancing with one another in the club, Gregory and Janine almost share a kiss before being interrupted by Amber and Janine eventually talks with Maurice (Vince Staples), a friend of Gregory. Elsewhere, Barbara and Melissa enjoy their annual dinner in the teachers lounge, until a Christmas-skeptical Jacob crashes. Mr. Johnson helps Jacob realize his burden and in the process helps him realize the true meaning of Christmas.
24	11	"Read-A-Thon"	Dime Davis	Garrett Werner	January 4, 2023	T12.17561	3.12
Melissa and Janine's classes compete at a read-a-thon hosted by a local pizza shop. Melissa learns that one of her students is struggling with reading; but when she attempts to talk to her parents about testing the student, they rebuff her and tell her she is a fine reader. Melissa ultimately wins the competition by using a loophole to second and third grade class scores together. Meanwhile, Jacob starts a podcasting club with Gregory, which ultimately goes awry when he turns the podcast into his own and refuses to take the club members seriously. Both students return, however, and interview Janine; who must be a guest on the podcast due to losing the bet with Melissa. They ask her about her experience at the hookah bar and Gregory learns that she spoke with Maurice.
25	12	"Fight"	Melissa Kosar	Jordan Temple	January 11, 2023	T12.17562	2.94
When two of Janine's students bicker with one another, Janine attempts to salvage their relationship by pairing them together; which ultimately worsens the problem and both get their older sisters involved. After speaking with Barbara, Janine decides to let them figure out their problems amongst themselves, which works. Ava and Melissa argue with Mr. Johnson about the latter's failed fantasy football draft. Meanwhile, Gregory attempts to impress his father Martin (Orlando Jones), who wants him to leave Abbott and join his landscaping business. In the process, Gregory reveals to Jacob and Barbara that he has been tending to their garden; much to their surprise. The fight between the students' sisters prompts Janine to call her own sister and ask to visit, to which she is left on voicemail.
26	13	"Fundraiser"	Randall Einhorn	Brittani Nichols	January 18, 2023	T12.17563	3.05
Barbara leads a fundraiser to help the school visit the Franklin Institute Science Museum by selling candy; but when her selling tactics fail to achieve the goals set out, Ava intervenes. Barbara learns that Ava told the students to overcharge for the candy, which angers her as she disagrees with her selling tactics. However, Barbara learns that Ava had to lie when she was younger and decides to invite one of her selling students, Henry, to help out at a church event and keep a percentage of the earnings. Ava in turn concedes to be upfront with Barbara about her project intentions going forward. Janine is asked out by Maurice, who contributes a donation to the fundraiser. Gregory grows jealous, and attempts to one-up Maurice by purchasing candy, leading to Jacob questioning his feelings for Janine. Meanwhile, Mr. Johnson and Jacob conflict with one another over a cat that found its way into the storage room. They ultimately learn that the cat is owned by a student.
27	14	"Valentine's Day"	Justin Tan	Justin Tan	February 8, 2023	T12.17565	3.22
On Valentine's Day, Janine asks Melissa for help regarding a student of hers who has a crush on her. Their conversation is misinterpreted by Jacob, who accidentally tells Janine that Gregory has a crush on her. Janine denies his claim and asks the staff what they think, to which they tell her that his crush is blatantly obvious. Amber and Maurice visit Abbott to see Janine and Gregory. Meanwhile, Ava sits in on Jacob's black history class after receiving a complaint from a parent but ends up enjoying his lessons, deciding to return to school and take night courses. Zach romantically surprises Jacob during his free period. Barbara struggles to make dinner reservations for her and her husband, while Melissa worries that her boyfriend Gary has yet to make plans. Gary ultimately surprises her just as her hopes are given up.
28	15	"Fire"	Jennifer Celotta	Ava Coleman	February 15, 2023	T12.17564	2.76
When a small fire breaks out in the teachers lounge, Ava rushes out of the school in a panic, abandoning everyone there. A district counselor visits the school after being invited by Gregory, who is stepping in as acting-principal in Ava's absence. The counselor suggests that Barbara is struggling to process the fire, as she's the one who accidentally started it with her candle. When Fire Captain Robinson arrives, he instructs a fire safety meeting, to which he bans open flames on school grounds. Barbara takes offense and goes off on the marshal, noting all of the careless things other teachers do without consequences. After being reconciled by Melissa, Barbara reveals that her husband Gerald had a health scare, and that the fire was the last straw. Meanwhile, Melissa lives out her childhood dream as a firefighter, much to the boredom of her students.
29	16	"Teacher Conference"	Randall Einhorn	Kate Peterman	February 22, 2023	T12.17566	2.62
The teachers attend the Philadelphia Teacher Conference, with Gregory joining shortly after Amber breaks up with him. Drunk, Gregory and Janine sneak into a closed exhibit and share a kiss. Barbara and Melissa plan to relax, but when Kristen Marie visits, along with other Addington teachers, she causes distraction in Melissa. Barbara argues Melissa to make up with her, which she does. Jacob is charmed by the Addington teachers when he separates himself from Janine, but ultimately learns of the dangers of charter schools. Kristen Marie visits Abbott undercover to inform Melissa that Draemond is planning to turn Abbott into a charter school.
30	17	"Mural Arts"	Geeta Malik	Joya McCrory	March 1, 2023	T12.17567	2.48
Jacob invites a local mural arts group to the school to create a mural outside of his classroom, but he becomes disappointed when his students want to center their mural on a sock puppet web show. Janine decides to break up with Maurice, with Gregory accompanying her to their next date out of guilt. Elsewhere, Barbara and Melissa learn that parents are signing a petition to turn Abbott into a charter school by Draemond's Legendary Schools and decide to fight back. Ava is impressed by the benefits of charter schools until she sees a former student's negative experience with Addington.
31	18	"Teacher Appreciation"	Randall Einhorn	Morgan Murphy	March 8, 2023	T12.17568	2.79
During teacher appreciation week, Ava wins the teachers two tickets to a Philadelphia 76ers game and makes them vote for who should get them. Ultimately, Mr. Johnson receives the most votes after everyone voted for him, unwilling to vote for other teachers. Janine invites her sister Ayesha (Ayo Edebiri) to visit, and after initial tension, they finally reconcile. Ava receives a note from the district notifying her of the petition to change Abbott into a Legendary Charter School.
32	19	"Festival"	Randall Einhorn	Brian Rubenstein	March 15, 2023	T12.17569	2.67
The teachers band together to collect signatures in an attempt to defend themselves against Legendary Charters. When their plan fails, the teachers brainstorm an idea to trick the parents into signing the petition at their open house. Ava has the students create art pieces, Jacob be the target of a dunk tank, and lies about Jazmine Sullivan appearing at the event. When the parents learn that Sullivan will not appear, Gregory invites Tariq, bringing the parents together. Draemond crashes the event and attempts to convince the parents that charter schools would benefit their children. However the parents question his plans and rally against him, in support of Abbott.
33	20	"Educator of the Year"	Claire Scanlon	Jordan Temple	April 5, 2023	T12.17570	2.72
When Gregory is awarded "Educator of the Year", a camera crew from a local news station arrives to document the ceremony for a segment; making Gregory uncomfortable. Janine has a parent-teacher conference to discuss a troubled student, but is told off by their parent who calls her a bad teacher. Elsewhere, Jacob helps Barbara with a continued teacher class mandated for her to complete by the district.
34	21	"Mom"	Ken Whittingham	Ava Coleman	April 12, 2023	T12.17571	2.74
When Janine earns enough money to treat herself, she plans a solo trip to Ocean City for Memorial Day Weekend. Her mom Vanetta (Taraji P. Henson) visits unexpectedly and subtly plots to ask her for her money to pay for her phone bill. Barbara intervenes with the situation, hoping that she does not give her the money, and Janine ultimately comes to an agreement. Elsewhere, Gregory is encouraged by the staff to work on his people skills.
35	22	"Franklin Institute"	Randall Einhorn	Brittani Nichols	April 19, 2023	T12.17572	2.90
As the school prepares to embark on their field trip to the Franklin Institute, Maurice runs into Janine and she apologizes for the way their relationship ended, he responds saying that she was selfish for the way it went and that Gregory told him not to ask her out. While on the trip, Janine distances herself from Gregory which causes him to panic and he asks Jacob for advice. Ava frightens the children by explaining the possibilities of extraterrestrials existing, and chaos breaks out when Barbara is mistaken for an alien. Amidst the chaos, Gregory and Janine confess their feelings for one another, however Janine states that she is not ready to have a relationship with Gregory, and the two decide to remain friends.

== Production ==
=== Development ===
The series was renewed for a second season by ABC in March 2022, just months prior to the first season concluding. In July 2022, the season was confirmed to consist of 22 episodes, nine more than the first. Production companies Delicious Non-Sequitur, 20th Television and Warner Bros. Television returned for the season, with Fifth Chance joining them having not produced the first season. A trailer for the season was released onto YouTube and various series social media accounts on September 1, 2022. Quinta Brunson hosted Saturday Night Live on April 1, in promotion of the series.

The series was later renewed for a third season in January 2023. When speaking of the third season renewal, Channing Dungey, chairman and CEO of Warner Bros. Television Group had this to say:

"This renewal is a richly deserved feather in the cap of Quinta Brunson, Justin Halpern, Patrick Schumacker, and Randall Einhorn, as well as the rest of the cast and crew of Abbott Elementary. Each week, this talented group of artists celebrates true unsung heroes — public school teachers. And for some extra icing on the renewal cake, our favorite group of teachers was honored this morning with two Screen Actors Guild Award nominations and last night with three Golden Globe Awards. Abbott Elementary is the gift that keeps on giving, and I look forward to many more magnificent episodes of this brilliant, authentic, and just plain funny series."

Brunson, Halpern, Schumacker and Einhorn are all expected to return as executive producers.

=== Casting ===
In March 2022, upon renewal for its second season, all main cast members from the first season were confirmed to return for the second, including; Quinta Brunson as Janine Teagues, Tyler James Williams as Gregory Eddie, Janelle James as Ava Coleman, Lisa Ann Walter as Melissa Schemmenti, Chris Perfetti as Jacob Hill and Sheryl Lee Ralph as Barbara Howard. In July 2022, just months prior to the series returning, it was announced that William Stanford Davis, who had recurred during the first season as Mr. Johnson, would be promoted to series regular for the second season.

Alongside the return of the first season's ensemble cast, recurring guest star Zack Fox reprised his role as Tariq Temple for three episodes. While multiple one-time first season guest stars also returned, being upped to recurring characters for the second. These actors included Kate Peterman as Tina Schwartz, Nikea Gamby-Turner and Reggie Conquest as Shanae and Devon, as well as Nate' Jones who portrays Amber. The return of her character added complications to the development of the relationship between Janine and Gregory; with notable events from their relationship taking place in "Holiday Hookah", "Valentine's Day", "Teacher Conference" and "Franklin Institute". When asked about their relationship, Lisa Ann Walter stated:

"Well, I mean, everybody wants to know obviously about the romance. I will say that there were a couple of interesting romantic moves that happen before the end of the season. I'm not going to say what, but I think the audience is going to be really happy. Also, they're just gonna be enthusiastic. Last year, when people were saying, 'What do you want to see happen?' and I gave a scenario...that's gonna happen and I can't tell you what it is, but it's coming up, and I loved the episode. It was a big episode. I think it might be my favorite episode this season."

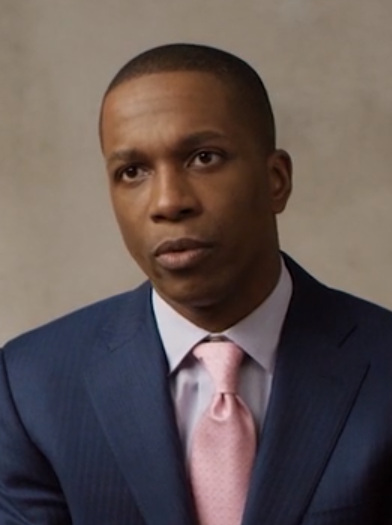
Leslie Odom Jr. (pictured) is introduced as Draemond Winding during the second season.

A week before the season premiered, it was announced that the season would see the introduction of various recurring guest stars, including Lauren Weedman as Kristen Marie, Keyla Monterroso Mejia as Ashley Garcia, and Leslie Odom Jr. as Draemond Winding. All of whom appeared within the first eight episodes of the season.

The season features a cameo from Philadelphia Flyers mascot Gritty in the premiere episode, which garnered a large amount of online attention. When asked by the National Hockey League, executive producer Patrick Schumacker stated that Gritty's appearance in the series was "a long time coming." He revealed that Gritty was originally due to appear in one of the early episodes of the first season, but scheduling conflicts delayed the cameo.

"Gritty was always, from the start, a Philadelphia institution that we wanted to incorporate into the show," "The show takes place in Philly, and we try, as much as we can, to populate the show with the insider Philly, whether that's Philly slang or actual cameos from locals of note, like Jim Gardner, who's the now-retired anchor of ABC News over in Philadelphia. We try to make it as authentically local to Philadelphia as possible. Gritty was a no-brainer, and also at the top of the list."

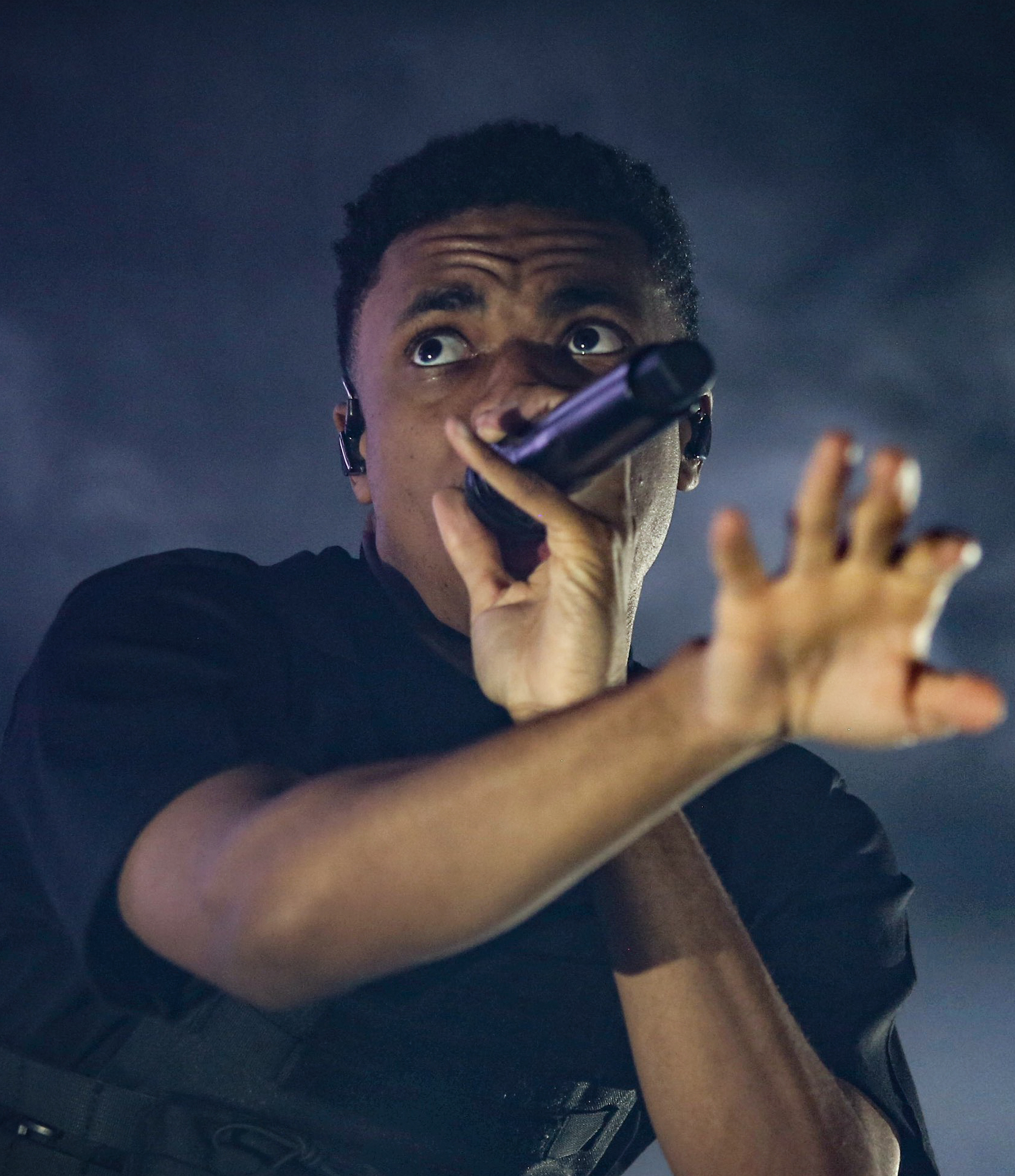
Vince Staples (pictured) is introduced as Maurice during the second season.

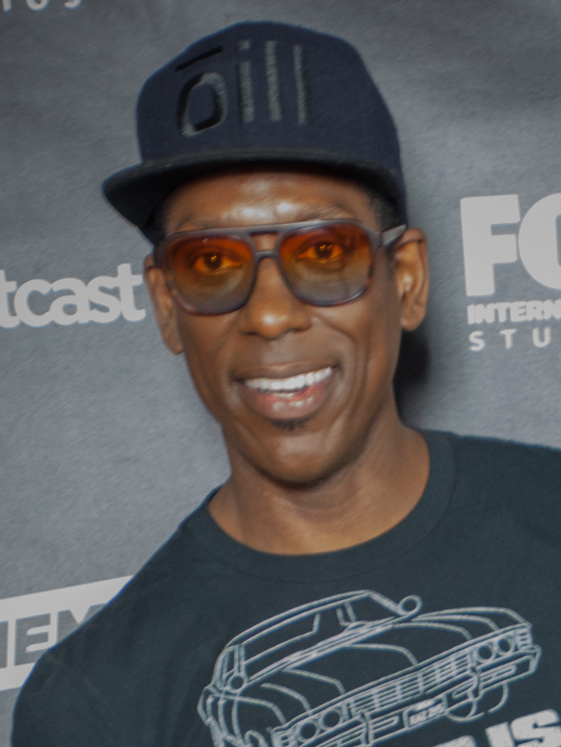
Orlando Jones (pictured) returns as Martin Eddie during the second season after having a cameo during the first.

In July 2022, while production of the second season was still in the early stages of filming, rapper Vince Staples jokingly asked to be cast in the series in a Twitter post to which Brunson replied "1. I'm not done writing 2. Come get your hat". Staples ultimately appeared during the "Holiday Hookah" episode, portraying Maurice, while also featuring Golden State Warriors player Andre Iguodala who portrays himself in a cameo. Staples returned in a few episodes throughout the season, becoming a recurring character. Orlando Jones returned in the season, portraying Gregory's father Martin. Jones' casting was widely praised, due to his physical similarities with Williams, who portrays Gregory.

On February 6, 2023, it was confirmed that Ayo Edebiri would recur as Ayesha, Janine's sister. Who is at first only mentioned in various episodes and appearing in a FaceTime call during "Valentine's Day", Edebiri returned as Ayesha for a more expansive role later in the season. In addition to the introduction of Ayesha, on April 1, 2023, it was announced that Taraji P. Henson would be introduced as their mother Vanetta, with her first appearance set during the penultimate episode of the season.

=== Filming ===
In a tweet made by Quinta Brunson, it was revealed that production on the second season had commenced on July 18, 2022. Like the first season, the interior scenes of the series are filmed at Warner Bros. Studios in Burbank, California, with exterior shots of the series being filmed in front of Vermont Elementary School in Los Angeles. Brunson confirmed in a tweet that filming for the season finale episode took place on January 24, 2023. Filming for the season ultimately concluded six days later on January 30, 2023.

== Reception ==
=== Critical response ===
On Rotten Tomatoes, the season has received an approval rating of 100% with an average rating of 8.7 out of 10, based on 22 reviews. The site's critical consensus reads, "Class is back in session and the plucky teachers of Abbott Elementary remain an absolute delight, with creator/star Quinta Brunson's savvy and sweet sensibility honed to perfection." Meanwhile, Metacritic has reported an average rating of 88 out of 100, based on ten reviews, indicating "universal acclaim".

Days before the season premiered, Daniel D'Addario of Variety praised Abbott Elementary by stating, "Abbott does the teachers at its center justice, and is proof of Brunson's ability to put familiar forms to worthy and delightful ends. Like a good student, the series colors, vividly, within the lines." In response to the season premiere, Samantha Nelson of IGN stated, "Abbott Elementary defends its spot as one of the funniest and most heartwarming shows on television with its Season 2 premiere. A new school year provides a great opportunity for characters to grow and change, facing new challenges with the same mix of clever quips and earnest enthusiasm that makes the sitcom's ensemble cast so loveable."

The season's twentieth episode, "Educator of the Year", was noted for its demonstration of teachers' vulnerabilities and insecurities. In the episode, Janine meets with the mother of one her students to discuss the student's disruptive behavior in class; after some challenging communication, the mother blames Janine and calls her a bad teacher. The scene, which portrays a distinctly more serious tone compared to the rest of the show's comedic stylings, contributes to the show's campaign of building empathy for teachers laboring to meet their students' needs. While primarily being an instance of Janine striving for perfection in her job, it also offers an example of how lack of support from students' parents can be yet another obstacle for the success of education.

=== Audience response ===
The season, just like the first, received overwhelming support from fans and celebrities alike; including Keke Palmer and Henry Winkler. The most notable support being from actor Brian Tyree Henry, who responded to a joke made about him during the "Wrong Delivery" cold open. He sent his supports sending flowers and a written note to Brunson personally; Henry was mistaken for actor Brian Austin Green by Barbara Howard during the scene. In addition, media personality, rapper and host of The Joe Budden Podcast Joe Budden acknowledged his name being mentioned during the "Read-a-Thon" episode, stating in a Twitter post; "Nah don't gas me.. I love that show lol."

Ralph was an honorable mention for "TVLine Performer of the Week" for the fifteenth episode in the season, "Fire", with the authors giving praise to her performance and stating, "This week's Abbott Elementary gave Emmy Award winner Sheryl Lee Ralph another chance to show off her impressive comedy chops. - Ralph brought the typically composed teacher to the brink, delivering increasingly hilarious and ridiculous declarations with determined energy ("I never listen to Chaka Khan's 'Through the Fire' when it comes up on my Pandora. I'm every woman, not a pyromaniac")."

=== Ratings ===
The season premiered on September 21, 2022, following premiere episodes of The Conners and The Goldbergs. The second season moves its time slot from Tuesday at 9:00 p.m. (EST) to Wednesday at 9:00 p.m. (EST). The premiere episode "Development Day", received a total of 4.30 million viewers after 35 days of multi-platform viewing, 73% higher than the pilot which garnered 3.67 million viewers in total. The episode became the highest viewed episode of an ABC series since the series finale of Modern Family. "Read-a-Thon" would later top the viewership of the first episode, bringing to 4.34 million viewers after 35 days of multi-platform viewing.

Viewership and ratings per episode of Abbott Elementary season 2
No.	Title	Air date	Rating (18–49)	Viewers (millions)	DVR (18–49)	DVR viewers (millions)	Total (18–49)	Total viewers (millions)
1	"Development Day"	September 21, 2022	0.6	2.92	0.3	1.38	0.9	4.30
2	"Wrong Delivery"	September 28, 2022	0.5	2.54	0.3	1.24	0.8	3.79
3	"Story Samurai"	October 5, 2022	0.5	2.63	0.3	1.22	0.8	3.85
4	"The Principal's Office"	October 12, 2022	0.5	2.63	0.3	1.11	0.7	3.74
5	"Juice"	October 19, 2022	0.5	2.54	0.3	1.09	0.8	3.63
6	"Candy Zombies"	October 26, 2022	0.6	2.88	0.3	1.23	0.8	4.12
7	"Attack Ad"	November 2, 2022	0.5	2.66	0.3	1.24	0.8	3.90
8	"Egg Drop"	November 16, 2022	0.5	2.66	0.3	1.17	0.8	3.83
9	"Sick Day"	November 30, 2022	0.5	2.56	0.2	0.98	0.7	3.54 (Note: Live+7 ratings were unavailable, so Live+3 ratings have been used instead.)
10	"Holiday Hookah"	December 7, 2022	0.5	2.63	0.2	0.93	0.7	3.56
11	"Read-A-Thon"	January 4, 2023	0.6	3.12	0.3	1.22	0.9	4.34
12	"Fight"	January 11, 2023	0.5	2.94	0.3	1.21	0.8	4.15
13	"Fundraiser"	January 18, 2023	0.6	3.05	0.3	1.21	0.8	4.26
14	"Valentine's Day"	February 8, 2023	0.6	3.22	TBD	TBD	TBD	TBD
15	"Fire"	February 15, 2023	0.5	2.76	TBD	TBD	TBD	TBD
16	"Teacher Conference"	February 22, 2023	0.5	2.62	TBD	TBD	TBD	TBD
17	"Mural Arts"	March 1, 2023	0.4	2.48	TBD	TBD	TBD	TBD
18	"Teacher Appreciation"	March 8, 2023	0.4	2.79	TBD	TBD	TBD	TBD
19	"Festival"	March 15, 2023	0.5	2.67	TBD	TBD	TBD	TBD
20	"Educator of the Year"	April 5, 2023	0.5	2.71	TBD	TBD	TBD	TBD
21	"Mom"	April 12, 2023	0.5	2.74	TBD	TBD	TBD	TBD
22	"Franklin Institute"	April 19, 2023	0.6	2.90	TBD	TBD	TBD	TBD
