= Abbott Elementary season 3 =

Season of television series

Abbott Elementary
- Season 3
- Promotional poster
- Showrunners: Patrick Schumacker; Justin Halpern
- Starring: Quinta Brunson; Tyler James Williams; Janelle James; Lisa Ann Walter; Chris Perfetti; William Stanford Davis; Sheryl Lee Ralph
- No. of episodes: 14

Release
- Original network: ABC
- Original release: February 7 – May 22, 2024

Season chronology
- ← Previous; Season 2 Next → Season 4

The third season of the American television comedy Abbott Elementary created by Quinta Brunson premiered in the United States on ABC on February 7, 2024, and concluded on May 22. The season consisted of 14 episodes, fewer episodes than the previous season due to the 2023 Writers Guild of America strike. Like the previous season, the season stars Brunson, Tyler James Williams, Janelle James, Lisa Ann Walter, Chris Perfetti, William Stanford Davis and Sheryl Lee Ralph.

Abbott Elementary is presented in a mockumentary format similar to one of The Office and Modern Family, and follows a documentary crew recording the lives of teachers working in underfunded schools including the fictional Willard R. Abbott Elementary School, a predominantly Black Philadelphia public school. Three days after the season premiere, the series was renewed for a fourth season.

== Cast and characters ==
=== Main ===
- Quinta Brunson as Janine Teagues, a second-grade teacher at Abbott and hopes to improve the lives of her students by making the best of the poor situation the school district makes teachers work in. At the beginning of the season, she begins working for the school district.
- Tyler James Williams as Gregory Eddie, a first-grade teacher who was initially hired as a substitute replacement, and who harbors a crush on Janine.
- Janelle James as Ava Coleman, the school's tone-deaf principal who consistently bullies Janine and gives the staff reasons to believe she is poor at her job; a job in which she received after blackmailing the superintendent.
- Lisa Ann Walter as Melissa Schemmenti, a second-grade teacher at Abbott who has questionable connections with the Philly locals, but uses them to help the school.
- Chris Perfetti as Jacob Hill, an eighth-grade history teacher who tries his best to help Janine with her plans to improve Abbott.
- William Stanford Davis as Mr. Johnson, the school's janitor who is seen as lazy, but consistent with his job.
- Sheryl Lee Ralph as Barbara Howard, a religious kindergarten teacher, Abbott’s longest serving teacher, adamant about keeping with tradition, and a mother-figure whom Janine looks up to.

=== Recurring ===
- Josh Segarra as Manny, the leader of a group of school district representatives for Philadelphia.
- Benjamin Norris as Simon, a school district representative under Manny who works alongside Janine.
- Kimia Behpoornia as Emily, a school district representative under Manny who works alongside Janine.
- Mason Renfro as Alex Perkins, a student in Janine's classroom.
- Zack Fox as Tariq Temple, Janine's ex-boyfriend and an aspiring rapper who is currently dating the mom of one of Barbara's students.
- Ben Onyx Dowdy as Warren, an HR Employee who works at the district.
- Keegan-Michael Key as John Reynolds, the Philadelphia School District's new superintendent.
- Karan Soni as Avi, an EMT who enters a romance with Jacob.
- Pam Trotter as Dia, an admissions office worker at Abbott.
- Jerry Minor as Mr. Morton, a colleague of Jacob whom he shares a complicated relationship with.
- Courtney Taylor as Erika, a friend of Janine who attempts to improve her social circle.

=== Guest ===
- Bruno Amato as Gary, a vending machine stocker who begins dating Melissa.
- Jalen Hurts, Brandon Graham and Jason Kelce as themselves, members of the Philadelphia Eagles who participate in Abbott's career day.
- Mike O'Malley as Captain Robinson, the captain of the Philadelphia fire department who visits Abbott.
- Sabrina Brier as Jessca, a substitute teacher for Janine's classroom.
- Casey Frey as Timothy, a F.A.D.E. representative who aspires to be like Tariq.
- Aparna Nancherla as Caroline, an unhelpful F.A.D.E. representative who follows Timothy.
- Larry Owens as Zach, Jacob's boyfriend, later ex.
- Shirley Jordan as Delisha Sloss, a member of Barbara's church.
- Sabrina Wu as Mx. Cassidy Geoffrey, a substitute teacher for Janine's class.
- Carlease Burke as Sister Sipp, a member of Barbara's church choir.
- Bradley Cooper as himself, a famous actor who visits Abbott Elementary.
- June Diane Raphael as Elizabeth Washington, Chief Education Officer for the Philadelphia Board of Education, who visits Abbott Elementary to document the school as a historic landmark.
- Jennifer Elise Cox as Joan, a woman working under Elizabeth.
- David Clayton Rogers as Willy R. Abbott V, a direct descendent of school founder Willard R. Abbott.
- Cree Summer as Rosalyn Inez, a librarian hired by the district for Janine's library program.
- Tatyana Ali as Crystal, a former sorority sister of Ava who is now the principal of another school.
- Brandon Kyle Goodman as Richard Tyler Williams, a coworker of Crystal.
- Garon Grigsby as Charles Pearlman, a man who offers a loan for Gregory's Garden Goofball program.
- Nikea Gamby-Turner as Chanae, a cafeteria custodian for the school.
- Reggie Conquest as Devin, a cafeteria custodian who works alongside Chanae.
- Questlove as himself, a musician who visits Abbott who is also an old friend of Ava.
- Lana Condor as Olivia, a coworker of Avi.
- Kevin Hart as himself, an actor and comedian who Janine suspects could be her father.
- Richard Brooks as Gerald, Barbara's husband.
- Iyana Halley as Taylor Howard, Barbara's daughter.
- Shea Coulee as Lisa Condo, a drag queen.
- Symone as Divine Intervention, a drag queen.
- Taraji P. Henson as Vanetta Teagues, Janine's mother.
- Michaela Watkins as Miss Barco, a teacher at Krystal's school.

== Episodes ==
No. overall	No. in season	Title	Directed by	Written by	Original release date	Prod. code	U.S. viewers (millions)
36	1	"Career Day"	Randall Einhorn	Quinta Brunson	February 7, 2024	T12.18301	2.81
37	2	"Career Day"	Randall Einhorn	Quinta Brunson	February 7, 2024	T12.18302	2.81
When Janine proposes an idea of a career day for the school, a trio of district representatives take note of her ambition and offer her a job alongside them. The teachers panic when Ava becomes competent at her job. Five months later, Janine returns to Abbott for the career day she organized, much to her uncomfortable re-counter with Gregory. Meanwhile, Gary plans a proposal to Melissa, despite her insistence on not getting married, leading to their break-up.
38	3	"Gregory's Garden Goofballs"	Justin Tan	Brian Rubenstein	February 14, 2024	T12.18303	2.71
When students begin hanging around Gregory's classroom, the other teachers pressure him into taking on more than just what is described in his job description. At the district, Janine attempts to hire an ASL interpreter for a student of Jacob, but runs into difficulties until a talk with Manny prompts her to do what is necessary. Meanwhile, Barbara deals with Tariq being the parent of a student in her class.
39	4	"Smoking"	Randall Einhorn	Jordan Temple	February 21, 2024	T12.18304	2.34
A conversation among the teachers about their smoking and drinking habits is spread around school, leading to the students wanting to smoke. Gregory and Melissa help a student who was caught with a cigarette, and Jacob tries to quit vaping. Meanwhile, when a new substitute (Sabrina Brier) is hired for Janine's classroom, she is caught off guard by their vastly different teaching methods.
40	5	"Breakup"	Jen Celotta	Brittani Nichols	February 28, 2024	T12.18305	2.33
Jacob's sudden want for more time away from home causes Gregory to worry about his relationship with Zach. Eventually, both realize that their relationship is falling apart, and decide to break-up. Meanwhile, when Barbara's church choir takes up the gym, Ava helps her ask for a solo, despite Barbara being against making any fuss. Melissa asks for Janine's help in investigating a new substitute who appears to have no qualifications for teaching.
41	6	"Willard R. Abbott"	Matt Sohn	Ava Coleman	March 10, 2024	T12.18307	6.90
When the school is named a historic landmark, furious parents point out that Willard R. Abbott, the man the school is named after, is a racist. Desperate to fix the situation and keep the status as a historic landmark, Janine leads an investigation to find a different Willard R. Abbott. Janine, Gregory and Jacob's discovery of a promising new face fails in front of them, prompting Janine to find a way to honor the original black teachers of Abbott instead. Meanwhile, Barbara and Melissa try to get Janine to leave the situation alone.
42	7	"Librarian"	Karan Soni	Morgan Murphy	March 13, 2024	T12.18306	2.27
Janine's library program idea is green-lit by the district and a librarian (Cree Summer) arrives at Abbott. Barbara finds it difficult to deal with the new changes to the school's library, despite the other teachers finding it useful to their classrooms. Meanwhile, Melissa and Jacob try to keep their newfound friendship under wraps from the other teachers after moving in together.
43	8	"Panel"	Claire Scanlon	Kate Peterman	March 20, 2024	T12.18308	2.29
Gregory and Ava are invited to speak on a panel about public schools, and both use the opportunity to promote the positive changes Abbott implements. Elsewhere, the other teachers face relationship judgements from one another while completing CPR training, and Janine secures approval from the district for her library program.
44	9	"Alex"	Randall Einhorn	Justin Tan	April 10, 2024	T12.18309	2.27
Janine gets an offer to take a full-time job at the school district after her fellowship is over. Gregory discovers that Alex, a student in Janine's former class, has been absent from school several times and will have to repeat the second grade if he misses one more day. Jacob is offended that Melissa and Barbara have been using a generative AI program to respond to emails he regularly sends them.
45	10	"2 Ava 2 Fest"	Ken Whittingham	Joya McCroy	April 17, 2024	T12.18310	2.24
Ava claims she has hired Questlove to perform at this year's Ava Fest. Jacob, Gregory, Barbara and Melissa are skeptical; the year prior, Ava lied about hiring Jazmine Sullivan to perform at Ava Fest. Janine assumes a full-time position at the district, but begins to regret her decision after realizing how much she misses every aspect of teaching at Abbott.
46	11	"Double Date"	Razan Ghalayini	Garrett Werner	May 1, 2024	T12.18311	2.49
Jacob invites Gregory on a double date with himself, Avi, and Avi's coworker, Olivia (Lana Condor). When they notice Janine out with Manny, Gregory grows anxious thinking they are dating, and in turn ruins his date with Olivia. Meanwhile, Ava assembles a book club with various teachers; however, their first meeting becomes a tense argument because of the members' conflicting interpretations of the book they are reading, Parable of the Sower.
47	12	"Mother's Day"	Richie Edelson	Riley Dufurrena	May 8, 2024	T12.18312	2.67
After Ava facetiously suggests Janine's father could be Kevin Hart, Janine becomes consumed by the idea; she does not know who her father is. When Barbara discovers that Gregory's mother died when he was a child, she invites him to her Mother's Day brunch despite knowing he already has plans for that day. Jacob is distraught to learn that the school does not have enough funding for a school-wide field trip.
48	13	"Smith Playground"	Jaime Eliezer Karas	Brian Rubenstein	May 15, 2024	T12.18313	2.33
The students and teachers of Abbott take a field trip to Smith Playground. However, another school has scheduled a field trip there for the same day, leading to conflict between the teachers. Gregory decides to tell Janine that he still has feelings for her, but has trouble finding the "right time" to tell her. Mr. Johnson cleans the empty school and disobeys Ava's rule that school staff members are not allowed in the basement, which leads him to make a surprising discovery.
49	14	"Party"	Randall Einhorn	Chad Morton & Rebekka Pesqueira	May 22, 2024	T12.18314	2.62
On the last day of school, Janine throws a party for the teachers, which she has meticulously planned. Meanwhile, Gregory is still unsure how to express his feelings for Janine; they are both concerned that dating a coworker will not end well.

== Production ==
=== Development ===
The series was renewed for a third season in January 2023, months prior to the conclusion of the second. The renewal was announced by Craig Erwich at the Television Critics Association's Winter 2023 press tour. When speaking of the third season renewal, Channing Dungey, chairman and CEO of Warner Bros. Television Group had this to say:

"This renewal is a richly deserved feather in the cap of Quinta Brunson, Justin Halpern, Patrick Schumacker, and Randall Einhorn, as well as the rest of the cast and crew of Abbott Elementary. Each week, this talented group of artists celebrates true unsung heroes — public school teachers. And for some extra icing on the renewal cake, our favorite group of teachers was honored this morning with two Screen Actors Guild Award nominations and last night with three Golden Globe Awards. Abbott Elementary is the gift that keeps on giving, and I look forward to many more magnificent episodes of this brilliant, authentic, and just plain funny series."

Brunson, Halpern, Schumacker and Einhorn are all expected to return as executive producers. Writing for the season was originally expected to commence on May 1, 2023; however the 2023 Writers Guild of America strike and 2023 SAG-AFTRA strike postponed this date indefinitely. Brunson, Sheryl Lee Ralph, and Lisa Ann Walter are among those from the cast who have publicly supported the strike, and as confirmed by writer Brittani Nichols, the strike affected the number of episodes and start date of the third season. In May 2023, it was announced via a press release by ABC, that the season premiere would be pushed back to an early 2024 air date. On November 10, 2023, the season was announced as consisting of 14 episodes.

=== Writing ===
Following writing delays due to the 2023 Hollywood labor disputes, writing began that October. The writers chose to explain the five month time-jump from the second season by having the camera crew being robbed, as they felt it was logical that way. They had envisioned including a teacher's strike in the narrative, but decided not to do so as they felt it was "too winky, too meta". As such, they chose to focus on how the difficulties underfunded teachers face by having Janine accept her new job with optimism. Additionally, the writers also consulted with a newly elected board member of the Los Angeles School District and various teachers who joined the WGA picket lines.

=== Casting ===
All seven regular cast members from the first two seasons returned; including Quinta Brunson, Tyler James Williams, Janelle James, Lisa Ann Walter, Chris Perfetti, William Stanford Davis and Sheryl Lee Ralph. In January 2024, it was announced that Josh Segarra, Kimia Behpoornia and Benjamin Norris had joined the cast in recurring roles, portraying school district representatives sent to make positive change to Abbott.

Like the seasons before it, the third season features various guest stars, most notably Philadelphia Eagles players Jalen Hurts, Brandon Graham and Jason Kelce. When asked about how the trio made their way on to the show, producer Justin Halpern stated:

"Jalen Hurts’ people actually emailed us in the middle of season two to say that he was a big fan of the show, and if there was ever an opportunity he’d be interested in being on it. Sports are a big part of Philadelphia. It’s in the DNA of the city. Quinta said before, “You can’t do a Philly show and not have them talking about sports.” So we’re doing this career day episode, and we want a fun, exciting guest star for our premiere — but not just a famous person because they’re famous."

In March 2024, it was confirmed that Lana Condor, Keegan-Michael Key, Cree Summer, Tatyana Ali and Karan Soni would guest star and/or recur during the season.

=== Filming ===
While being interviewed by Deadline Hollywood, Sheryl Lee Ralph revealed that principal photography for the third season was originally expected to commence in July 2023; however this date was pushed back indefinitely due to the strikes. After both strikes were resolved, the third season was confirmed to begin filming on November 27, 2023. Like the first two seasons, the interior scenes of the series are filmed at Warner Bros. Studios in Burbank, California, with exterior shots of the series being filmed in front of Vermont Elementary School in Los Angeles.

== Reception ==
=== Critical response ===
On Rotten Tomatoes, the season has received an approval rating of 100% based on 8 reviews.

=== Ratings ===
The season premiered on February 7, 2024, following premiere episodes of The Conners and Not Dead Yet. The third season retains its time slot of Wednesday nights at 9:00 p.m. ET/PT.

"Willard R. Abbott" aired in a special Sunday-night scheduling following the 96th Academy Awards, resulting in a series high in total viewership, and audience share among viewers 18–49.

Viewership and ratings per episode of Abbott Elementary season 3
No.	Title	Air date	Rating/share (18–49)	Viewers (millions)	DVR (18–49)	DVR viewers (millions)	Total (18–49)	Total viewers (millions)	Ref.
1	"Career Day, Part 1"	February 7, 2024	0.48/6	2.81	—N/a	—N/a	—N/a	—N/a	
2	"Career Day, Part 2"	February 7, 2024	0.48/6	2.81	—N/a	—N/a	—N/a	—N/a	
3	"Gregory's Garden Goofballs"	February 14, 2024	0.44/5	2.71	—N/a	—N/a	—N/a	—N/a	
4	"Smoking"	February 21, 2024	0.36/4	2.34	—N/a	—N/a	—N/a	—N/a	
5	"Breakup"	February 28, 2024	0.33/4	2.33	—N/a	—N/a	—N/a	—N/a	
6	"Willard R. Abbott"	March 10, 2024	1.43/16	6.90	—N/a	—N/a	—N/a	—N/a	
7	"Librarian"	March 13, 2024	0.35/4	2.27	—N/a	—N/a	—N/a	—N/a	
8	"Panel"	March 20, 2024	0.28/3	2.29	0.23	1.08	0.51	3.37	
9	"Alex"	April 10, 2024	0.32/4	2.29	0.26	1.20	0.58	3.49	
10	"2 Ava 2 Fest"	April 17, 2024	0.27/4	2.24	0.29	1.15	0.56	3.39	
11	"Double Date"	May 1, 2024	0.40/4	2.49	0.26	1.11	0.66	3.59	
12	"Mother's Day"	May 8, 2024	0.43/4	2.67	0.24	1.10	0.67	3.67	
13	"Smith Playground"	May 15, 2024	0.33/3	2.33	0.22	0.95	0.55	3.28	
14	"Party"	May 22, 2024	0.44/5	2.62	—N/a	—N/a	—N/a	—N/a	
