= Quinta Brunson =

American actress, writer, comedian and producer (born 1989)

- Brunson in 2025
- Born: December 21, 1989 (age 36); Philadelphia, Pennsylvania, U.S.
- Education: Temple University
- Occupations: Actress; comedian; writer; producer
- Years active: 2014–present
- Notable work: Abbott Elementary
- Spouse: Kevin Jay Anik (m. 2021; div. 2025)

Quinta Brunson (/ˈkwɪntə/; born December 21, 1989) is an American actress, comedian, writer, and producer. She is the creator, executive producer and co-writer of the ABC comedy series Abbott Elementary (2021–present), in which she stars as second-grade teacher Janine Teagues. Brunson gained prominence in 2014 for her self-produced Instagram series Girl Who Has Never Been on a Nice Date. She went on to produce and act in videos for BuzzFeed Video and developed two streaming series with BuzzFeed Motion Pictures.

At the 74th Primetime Emmy Awards, she became the first Black woman to be nominated three times in the comedy category, receiving nominations for Outstanding Writing for a Comedy Series (which she won), Outstanding Comedy Series (as an executive producer), and Outstanding Lead Actress in a Comedy Series. At the 75th ceremony, she became the first Black woman to win Outstanding Lead Actress in a Comedy in over 40 years. Brunson was honored with a 2022 Peabody Award for her work on Abbott Elementary. She was also placed on the Time 100 Most Influential People of 2022 list.

Brunson has acted in the series iZombie, Single Parents, and Miracle Workers; provided voice work for Lazor Wulf and Magical Girl Friendship Squad; and starred in the first season of the HBO sketch comedy series A Black Lady Sketch Show.

More recently, she has done voice work for The Simpsons, Zootopia 2, and Big Mouth.

== Early life and education ==
Brunson was born and raised in West Philadelphia. She attended Harrity Elementary School in the Cobbs Creek neighborhood. Her name was taken from the Spanish word for "fifth" and signifies that she is the youngest of five children. Her mother, Norma Jean, taught kindergarten and her father, Rick, managed parking lots. She was raised as a Jehovah's Witness but left the religion when she was 21.

She has described herself as "obsessed" with comedy from the time she attended the Charter High School for Architecture & Design in Philadelphia, and nurtured her interest by taking an improv class. Brunson attended Temple University and took classes at Second City in Chicago her sophomore year. She dropped out of school shortly thereafter to move to Los Angeles and pursue a career in comedy. She received an honorary degree in Fine Arts from Temple University in 2024.

== Career ==
=== 2014–2017: Instagram and Buzzfeed ===
Brunson originally garnered fans online by posting comedic videos to her Instagram in 2014. In particular, her Girl Who Has Never Been on a Nice Date series went viral and grew her digital fan base. She then worked as a video producer for BuzzFeed Video after first freelancing for the company. Her videos primarily focused on problems experienced by twenty-somethings.

In 2016, Brunson sold two web series as a development partner with BuzzFeed Motion Pictures: one scripted comedy called Broke for YouTube Red, which she wrote, produced, and starred in; the second, Up for Adoption, was produced by Verizon's go90 video platform, which she also starred in. Brunson's performance in Broke was nominated for Best Acting in a Comedy at the Streamy Awards in 2017.

=== 2018–2021: Various ventures and pilots ===
Shortly after Brunson left BuzzFeed in 2018, she co-starred in her first network pilot, the CW pilot The End of the World as We Know It, but the show was not picked up by the network. She also wrote and produced a series called Quinta vs. Everything that streamed on Facebook Watch from 2017 to 2018. On October 4, 2018, it was announced that a pilot co-produced by Brunson, Larry Wilmore, and Jermaine Fowler would be developed by CBS into a multi-cam comedy called Quinta & Jermaine. The pilot would star Fowler and Brunson as longtime friends who must deal with an unplanned pregnancy; however, the show was not picked up.

In 2019, she appeared as Dr. Charli Collier and her twin sister, Laila, on the supernatural comedy-drama series iZombie, and also voiced multiple characters in the animated series Lazor Wulf. That fall, Brunson began to co-star in the HBO sketch comedy series A Black Lady Sketch Show, alongside Robin Thede, Gabrielle Dennis, and Ashley Nicole Black; but she left the second season due to scheduling conflicts. In 2020, Brunson co-starred in the Syfy animated series Magical Girl Friendship Squad, opposite Anna Akana.

In 2021, Brunson appeared in a recurring role on the third season of Miracle Workers, and in June, her debut book, She Memes Well, a collection of essays about her personal life and career, was released.

=== 2018–present: Abbott Elementary and mainstream success ===
Brunson's single-camera pilot (previously titled Harrity Elementary after the school she attended, which is now a charter school) was picked up by ABC with the new title Abbott Elementary in May 2021. Brunson is also the writer, co-executive producer, and stars with Sheryl Lee Ralph, Lisa Ann Walter, Chris Perfetti, Tyler James Williams, and Janelle James. The series premiered on December 7, 2021, and received critical acclaim. Brunson received praise for bringing a fresh approach to network television with Abbott Elementary, named after her real-life former middle school teacher, Joyce Abbott, who worked in the Philadelphia School District for over 25 years. The character, Barbara Howard, is inspired by Brunson's mother, Norma Jean, who taught kindergarten for over 40 years. In August 2022, Brunson signed a multi-year overall deal with Warner Bros. Television, the co-production studio of Abbott Elementary.

For the show's first season she was named to Time's 100 Most Influential People of 2022. In September 2022, Brunson won an Emmy for Outstanding Writing For a Comedy Series for the show, making her the first black woman to win that award solo. The series received a 2023 Peabody Award. In 2023, Brunson won the Primetime Emmy Award for Outstanding Lead Actress in a Comedy Series for playing idealistic second-grade teacher Janine Teagues on Abbott Elementary. This win made her only the second black actress to win in this category after Isabel Sanford, who won in 1981 for her role as Louise Jefferson on The Jeffersons. Ayo Edebiri won the Primetime Emmy Award for Outstanding Supporting Actress in a Comedy Series that same year, making it the first year that two black actresses won both female comedy acting categories in the Primetime Emmys.

The show along with ABC decided to redirect marketing dollars towards supplies for schools and teachers. The Traveling Teacher's Lounge was an initiative that partnered with Scholastic to provide classroom supplies such as; books, notebooks, writing utensils, arts and crafts materials, and breakfast to schools around the United States.

In April 2023, she made her Saturday Night Live hosting debut. During the 2023 Met Gala, she stated her support for the writers strike, which was to start on the same night of the event, in an interview. In October 2023, Brunson signed an open letter by Artists4Ceasefire, calling for an end to the Israeli invasion of Gaza.

In July 2025, she received her fourth Primetime Emmy Award for Outstanding Lead Actress in a Comedy Series nomination, making her the third most-nominated black woman in lead comedy actress, trailing Isabel Sanford (The Jeffersons) and tied with Tracee Ellis Ross (Black-ish).

In February 2026, Brunson received the Variety Showrunner Award at SCAD (Savannah College of Art and Design) TVfest. Sharing the stage with Sheryl Lee Ralph and answering a question posed by Ralph, Brunson discussed her desire to remain an actress, writer, and executive producer, and not to step into the role of director. She attributed the reason to ensuring her presence in the writers' room would not be absent.

In May 2026, Brunson and Mark Fleischer announced that she would develop and star in a Betty Boop film.

In June 2026, Brunson signed a five-year deal with 20th Television and left Warner Bros. Television Studios.

== Personal life ==
Brunson was married to Kevin Jay Anik. He works in California's legal cannabis industry. They lived in the San Fernando Valley. She posted a photo of her engagement ring in 2020 but did not publicly confirm their marriage until she referred to Anik as her husband in her 2022 Emmys speech. On March 19, 2025, Brunson filed for divorce due to "irreconcilable differences".

== Bibliography ==
- 2021. She Memes Well: Essays. HarperCollins. Publication date June 15, 2021. ISBN 9781328637079

== Filmography ==
Key
†	Denotes films that have not yet been released

=== Film ===
Year	Title	Role	Notes
2020	An American Pickle	Female Interviewee	
2021	As of Yet	Lyssa	
2022	Weird: The Al Yankovic Story	Oprah Winfrey	
2024	A Nonsense Christmas with Sabrina Carpenter	Herself	
2024	Golden	—N/a	Unreleased
2025	Zootopia 2	Dr. Fuzzby	Voice
2026	The Cat in the Hat	Sherri	Voice

=== Television ===
Year	Title	Role	Notes
2017	Broke	Miloh	Web series; also creator, writer, executive producer, and director
2017	Up for Adoption	Michelle	go90 streaming series; also creator, writer, and executive producer
2017–2018	Quinta vs. Everything	Quinta	Web series; also creator, writer, and executive producer
2018	New Girl	Annabelle	Episode: "Mario"
2018–2020	Single Parents	Bess	3 episodes
2019	iZombie	Dr. Charlie Collier, Laila	3 episodes
2019; 2022	A Black Lady Sketch Show	Various characters	Main cast (Season 1); guest (Season 3)
2019–2025	Big Mouth	Quinta, Girl (voice)	5 episodes
2019–2025	Lazor Wulf	Blazor Wulf, The Youth, Bayonette Wulf, Farm Worker, Pearl (voice)	Main cast (19 episodes); also wrote 2 episodes
2020	Magical Girl Friendship Squad	Alex (voice)	Main cast (6 episodes)
2021	Crank Yankers	Barbara (voice)	Episode: "Brian Posehn, Kevin Nealon, Quinta Brunson"
2021–2023	Miracle Workers	Trig (S3) / Administrator (S4)	Recurring role (7 episodes)
2021–present	Abbott Elementary	Janine Teagues	Main cast; also creator, writer, and executive producer
2022	Cars on the Road	Ivy (voice)	3 episodes
2023	Harley Quinn	Hawkgirl (voice)	Episode: "A Very Problematic Valentine's Day Special"
2023	Party Down	Jaff	Episode: "Kyle Bradway Is Nitromancer"
2023	History of the World, Part II	Martha Magdalene	Episode: "IV"
2023–2025	Saturday Night Live	Herself (host)	2 episodes
2024	Sesame Street	Herself	Episode: "Are You Ready for School?"
2025	RuPaul's Drag Race	Herself (guest judge)	Episode: "Snatch Game"
2025	The Studio	Herself	Episode: "The Golden Globes"
2025	It's Always Sunny in Philadelphia	Janine Teagues	Crossover episode: "The Gang F***s Up Abbott Elementary"
2026	The Simpsons	Adrienne (voice)	Episode: “Irrational Treasure”

=== Music videos ===
Year	Title	Artist	Role	Notes
2018	"Come Over"	The Internet	Neighbor	Plays the role of the nosy neighbor
2020	"Dragonball Durag"	Thundercat	Girl	Plays the role of the first love interest
2024	"Little Foot Big Foot"	Childish Gambino feat. Young Nudy	Venue owner	

== Awards and nominations ==
Organizations	Year	Category	Work	Result	Ref.
AAFCA TV Honors	2022	Best TV Comedy	Abbott Elementary	Won	
AAFCA TV Honors	2022	Breakout Star	Abbott Elementary	Won	
BET Awards	2025	Best Actress	Herself	Nominated	
BET Awards	2026	Best Actress	Herself	Nominated	
Black Reel Awards	2022	Outstanding Comedy Series	Abbott Elementary	Won	
Black Reel Awards	2022	Outstanding Actress, Comedy Series	Abbott Elementary	Won	
Black Reel Awards	2022	Outstanding Writing, Comedy Series	Abbott Elementary (for "Pilot")	Won	
Black Reel Awards	2022	Outstanding Guest Actress, Comedy Series	A Black Lady Sketch Show	Won	
Celebration of Black Cinema & Television	2022	Actress Award for Television	Abbott Elementary	Won	
Critics Choice Television Awards	2023	Best Actress in a Comedy Series	Abbott Elementary	Nominated	
Critics Choice Television Awards	2023	Best Comedy Series	Abbott Elementary	Won	
Critics Choice Television Awards	2024	Best Actress in a Comedy Series	Abbott Elementary	Nominated	
Critics Choice Television Awards	2024	Best Comedy Series	Abbott Elementary	Nominated	
Dorian Awards	2022	Best TV Comedy	Abbott Elementary	Won	
Dorian Awards	2022	Best TV Performance	Abbott Elementary	Won	
Dorian Awards	2022	Wilde Wit Award	—N/a	Nominated	
Golden Globe Awards	2022	Best Actress in a Television Series – Musical or Comedy	Abbott Elementary (season one)	Won	
Golden Globe Awards	2023	Best Actress in a Television Series – Musical or Comedy	Abbott Elementary (season two)	Nominated	
Golden Globe Awards	2024	Best Actress in a Television Series – Musical or Comedy	Abbott Elementary (season three)	Nominated	
Gotham Awards	2022	Breakthrough Series – Short Format	Abbott Elementary	Nominated	
Humanitas Prize	2022	Comedy Teleplay	Abbott Elementary	Nominated	
HCA TV Awards	2022	TV Breakout Star	Abbott Elementary	Won	
HCA TV Awards	2022	Best Broadcast Network Series, Comedy	Abbott Elementary	Won	
HCA TV Awards	2022	Best Actress in a Comedy Series	Abbott Elementary	Won	
HCA TV Awards	2022	Best Writing in a Comedy Series	Abbott Elementary (for "Pilot")	Won	
Independent Spirit Awards	2022	Best Lead Performance in a New Scripted Series	Abbott Elementary	Won	
Independent Spirit Awards	2022	Best New Scripted Series	Abbott Elementary	Nominated	
Las Culturistas Culture Awards	2025	Eva Longoria Award for Tiny Woman, Huge Impact	—N/a	Won	
NAACP Image Awards	2022	Outstanding Comedy Series	Abbott Elementary	Won	
NAACP Image Awards	2022	Outstanding Actress in a Comedy Series	Abbott Elementary	Won	
NAACP Image Awards	2022	Outstanding Breakthrough Creative (Television)	Abbott Elementary	Won	
NAACP Image Awards	2022	Outstanding Writing in a Comedy Series	Abbott Elementary (for "Development Day")	Nominated	
NAACP Image Awards	2022	Entertainer of the Year	Herself	Nominated	
NAACP Image Awards	2024	Outstanding Comedy Series	Abbott Elementary	Won	
NAACP Image Awards	2024	Outstanding Actress in a Comedy Series	Abbott Elementary	Won	
NAACP Image Awards	2025	Outstanding Comedy Series	Abbott Elementary	Won	
NAACP Image Awards	2025	Outstanding Actress in a Comedy Series	Abbott Elementary	Won	
NAACP Image Awards	2026	Outstanding Comedy Series	Abbott Elementary	Won	
NAACP Image Awards	2026	Outstanding Actress in a Comedy Series	Abbott Elementary	Won	
NAACP Image Awards	2026	Outstanding Character Voice Performance – Motion Picture	Zootopia 2	Won	
Primetime Emmy Awards	2022	Outstanding Comedy Series (as executive producer)	Abbott Elementary (season one)	Nominated	
Primetime Emmy Awards	2022	Outstanding Lead Actress in a Comedy Series	Abbott Elementary (for "Pilot")	Nominated	
Primetime Emmy Awards	2022	Outstanding Writing for a Comedy Series	Abbott Elementary (for "Pilot")	Won	
Primetime Emmy Awards	2023	Outstanding Comedy Series (as executive producer)	Abbott Elementary (season two)	Nominated	
Primetime Emmy Awards	2023	Outstanding Lead Actress in a Comedy Series	Abbott Elementary (for "Teacher Conference)	Won	
Primetime Emmy Awards	2023	Outstanding Guest Actress in a Comedy Series	Saturday Night Live (for "Quinta Brunson/Lil Yachty")	Nominated	
Primetime Emmy Awards	2024	Outstanding Comedy Series (as executive producer)	Abbott Elementary (season three)	Nominated	
Primetime Emmy Awards	2024	Outstanding Lead Actress in a Comedy Series	Abbott Elementary (for "Party")	Nominated	
Primetime Emmy Awards	2024	Outstanding Writing for a Comedy Series	Abbott Elementary (for "Career Day")	Nominated	
Primetime Emmy Awards	2025	Outstanding Comedy Series (as executive producer)	Abbott Elementary (season four)	Nominated	
Primetime Emmy Awards	2025	Outstanding Lead Actress in a Comedy Series	Abbott Elementary (for "Strike")	Nominated	
Primetime Emmy Awards	2025	Outstanding Writing for a Comedy Series	Abbott Elementary (for "Back to School")	Nominated	
Primetime Emmy Awards	2026	Outstanding Comedy Series (as executive producer)	Abbott Elementary (season five)	Nominated	
Primetime Emmy Awards	2026	Outstanding Writing for a Comedy Series	Abbott Elementary (for "Team Building")	Nominated	
Primetime Emmy Awards	2026	Outstanding Lead Actress in a Comedy Series	Abbott Elementary	Nominated	
Actor Awards	2022	Outstanding Ensemble in a Comedy Series	Abbott Elementary season one	Won	
Actor Awards	2022	Outstanding Female Actor in a Comedy Series	Abbott Elementary season one	Nominated	
Actor Awards	2023	Outstanding Ensemble in a Comedy Series	Abbott Elementary season two	Nominated	
Actor Awards	2023	Outstanding Female Actor in a Comedy Series	Abbott Elementary season two	Nominated	
Actor Awards	2024	Outstanding Ensemble in a Comedy Series	Abbott Elementary season three	Nominated	
Actor Awards	2024	Outstanding Female Actor in a Comedy Series	Abbott Elementary season three	Nominated	
TCA Awards	2022	Program of the Year	Abbott Elementary	Won	
TCA Awards	2022	Outstanding Achievement in Comedy	Abbott Elementary	Won	
TCA Awards	2022	Outstanding New Program	Abbott Elementary	Won	
TCA Awards	2022	Individual Achievement in Comedy	Abbott Elementary	Won	
TCA Awards	2023	Program of the Year	Abbott Elementary	Nominated	
TCA Awards	2023	Outstanding Achievement in Comedy	Abbott Elementary	Nominated	
TCA Awards	2023	Individual Achievement in Comedy	Abbott Elementary	Nominated	
TCA Awards	2024	Outstanding Achievement in Comedy	Abbott Elementary	Nominated	
TCA Awards	2024	Individual Achievement in Comedy	Abbott Elementary	Nominated	
Writers Guild of America Awards	2023	Comedy Series	Abbott Elementary	Nominated	
Writers Guild of America Awards	2023	New Series	Abbott Elementary	Nominated	
Writers Guild of America Awards	2024	Comedy Series	Abbott Elementary	Nominated	

== Honorary awards ==
- 2022 – Time 100 Most Influential People
- 2022 – Philadelphia City Council resolution honoring Brunson for her creation of Abbott Elementary
- 2022 – The Hollywood Reporter's Women in Entertainment Power 100 list
- 2022 – Peabody Award as the creator of the hit mockumentary Abbott Elementary.
- 2023 – University of Pennsylvania Graduate School of Education commencement speaker
- 2024 – Temple University honorary degree and commencement speaker
- 2024 – Peabody Trailblazer Award
- 2025 – Brunson received key to the City of Philadelphia
- 2026 – Vanguard Award, GLAAD Media Awards
