= Broke (2017 TV series) =

American comedy web series

- Created by: Quinta Brunson
- Starring: Quinta Brunson; Maurice Williams; Paul DuPree
- Country of origin: United States
- Original language: English
- No. of seasons: 1
- No. of episodes: 11

Production
- Running time: 8–19 minutes

Original release
- Network: YouTube Red
- Release: January 26 – March 23, 2017

Broke is an American comedy web series produced exclusively for YouTube Red, starring Quinta Brunson. The series premiered on January 26, 2017. The first season, which had 11 episodes, ended on March 23, 2017. The series was produced by BuzzFeed Motion Pictures, the second YouTube Red digital original series from the company after Squad Wars.

The series is about three friends (also featuring Maurice Williams and Paul DuPree) move from Philadelphia to Los Angeles.

== Cast ==
- Quinta Brunson as Miloh
- Maurice Williams as Maurice
- Paul DuPree as Paul

== Episodes ==
No.	Title	Episode length	Original Release Date
1	"Fall of the Ottoman Empire"		
2	"Mother of Pearl"		
3	"Passin' the Blunt"		
4	"You're No Better"		
5	"Happy Birthday Paul"		
6	"The Game of Dating"		
7	"The Return"		
8	"Great Artists Steal"		
9	"Paul the Zombie"		
10	"You vs. the Bank"		
11	"Finale"		
