= Josh Segarra =

American actor (born 1986)

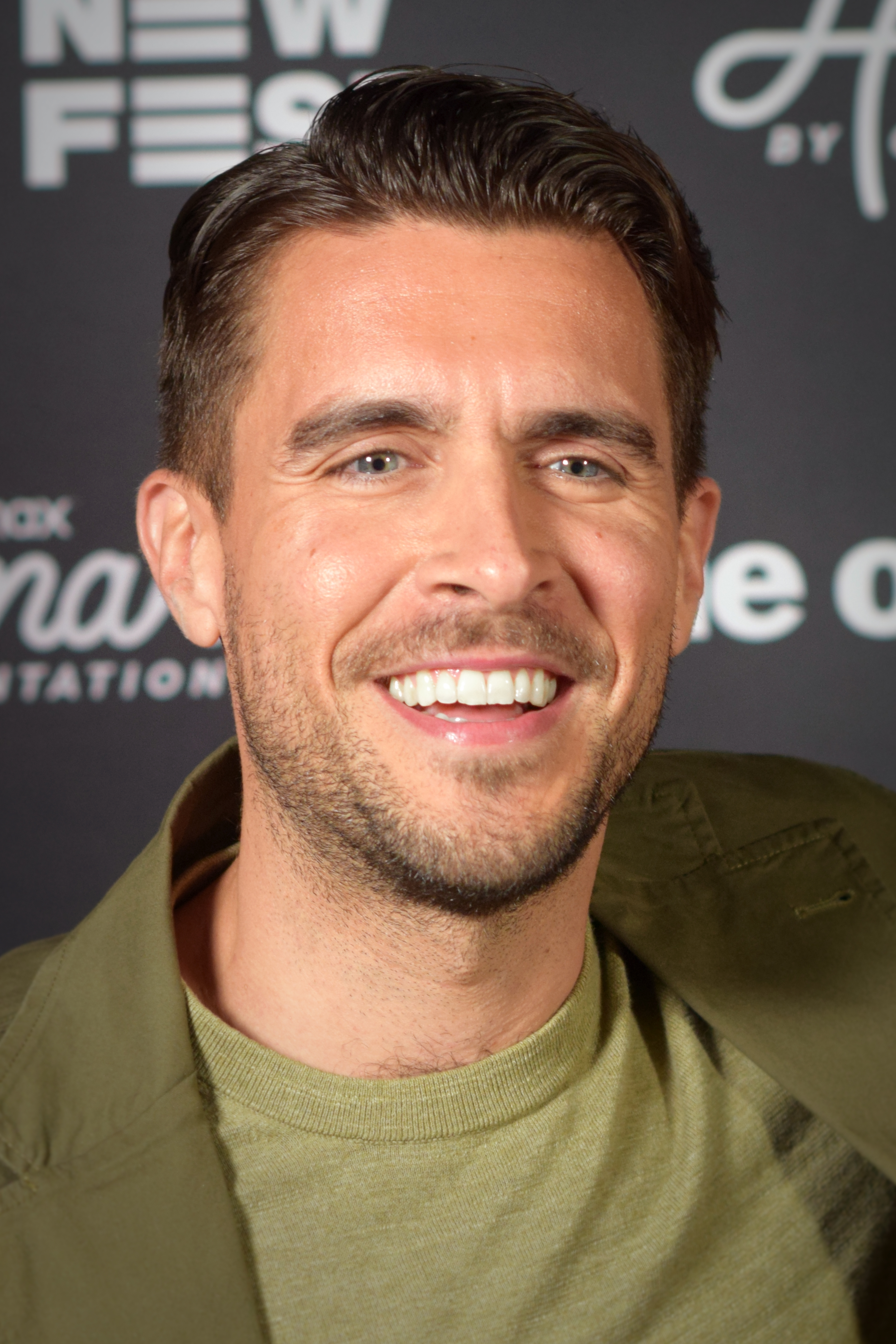
- Segarra in 2023
- Born: Joshua Segarra; June 3, 1986 (age 40); Longwood, Florida, U.S.
- Education: New York University (BFA)
- Occupation: Actor
- Years active: 2005–present
- Spouse: Brace Rice (m. 2014)
- Children: 3

Joshua "Josh" Segarra (born June 3, 1986) is an American actor. He is known for his roles on the television series The Electric Company, Sirens, and Arrow as well as for originating the role of Emilio Estefan in the musical On Your Feet!. His other television credits include Chicago P.D., The Other Two, AJ and the Queen, Orange Is the New Black, and She-Hulk: Attorney at Law, while his other theatrical credits include the musicals Lysistrata Jones and Dogfight, and the slasher horror film Scream VI.

== Early life ==
Segarra was born on June 3, 1986, in Longwood, Florida. He is Puerto Rican, and is fluent in Spanish. He learned to sing in his Pentecostal church but aspired to be a professional wrestler. Segarra is a graduate of NYU's Tisch School of the Arts.

== Career ==
From 2009 to 2011, Segarra portrayed a main role of Hector Ruiz on the PBS Kids Go television series The Electric Company. He then originated the role of Mick in the musical Lysistrata Jones. In May 2012, Segarra was announced as a cast member for the Off-Broadway world premiere of Dogfight, a musical adaptation of the film of the same name, with music and lyrics by Benj Pasek and Justin Paul and a book by Peter Duchan. The musical opened at the Tony Kiser Theater at Second Stage Theater on July 16, 2012.

Two years later, he recurred during the first season of the comedy television series Sirens, after which he was promoted to a series regular during its second season. Segarra then began a recurring role on the NBC police procedural drama Chicago P.D. He also appeared in the 2015 comedy film Trainwreck. Segarra originated the role of Emilio Estefan in the musical On Your Feet!, which opened at the Marquis Theater on Broadway on November 5, 2015. His final performance took place on July 10, 2016. Following his final appearance on Chicago P.D. in May 2016, Segarra was cast as a series regular on the CW superhero television series Arrow for its fifth season. He portrayed the series' adaptation of the comic book character Adrian Chase. He then returned in a guest starring capacity during the series' sixth and eighth seasons.

From 2019-2023, Segarra was a recurring cast member on The Other Two, a comedy television series on HBO Max. In December, he recurred on The Moodys as Marco, a "commodities broker with exquisite phone skills." He also starred in the Netflix comedy series AJ and the Queen, which premiered on January 10, 2020. That same year, Segarra appeared as a special agent during the third season of the crime drama series FBI and starred as a pastor in the musical film Christmas on the Square.

In 2022, Segarra appeared in the Disney+ superhero series She-Hulk: Attorney at Law. He had a supporting role in the slasher sequel Scream VI, the sixth installment in the Scream series, which was released in March 2023. That same year, he appeared in the second season of the drama series Heels. He also appears as Giorgio in the Apple TV+ series The Big Door Prize season 1 and season 2.

In 2024, he also portrayed Manny, a school district representative for Philadelphia, in Abbott Elementary.

In July 2025, it was announced that Segarra joined the main cast of the Fox series, Best Medicine, which premiered in January 2026.

== Personal life ==
Segarra married his longtime girlfriend Brace Rice on October 17, 2014. They have three sons together.

== Filmography ==
=== Film ===
Year	Title	Role	Notes
2008	The Narrows	White Gangsta	
2009	Blood Night: The Legend of Mary Hatchet	Tyler	
2009	The Ministers	Louis	
2011	The Music Never Stopped	Mark Ferris	
2014	You Must Be Joking	Asshole	
2015	Trainwreck	Staten Island Oli	
2018	Overboard	Jason	
2020	Christmas on the Square	Pastor Christian Hathaway	
2023	Scream VI	Danny Brackett	
2024	Friendship	Devon	
2025	The Threesome	Kevin	
2026	Roommates	Goose	
TBA	Untitled Stephen Merchant film		Filming

=== Television ===
Year	Title	Role	Notes
2005	Vampire Bats	Miles	Television film
2008	Drama Queenz	Gabriel	3 episodes
2009–2011	The Electric Company	Hector Ruiz	Main role
2011	Homeland	Josh	Episode: "Pilot"
2012	Bronx Warrants	Morales	Unaired pilot
2013	The Following	Hank Flynn	Episode: "The Siege"
2014	Blue Bloods	Mike Rose	Episode: "Knockout Game"
2014–2015	Sirens	Billy Cepeda	Main role
2014–2016	Chicago P.D.	Justin Voight	Recurring role
2016	A Bronx Life	Frankie	Television film
2016–2019	Arrow	Adrian Chase / Prometheus / Simon Morrison	Main cast (season 5); Guest star (seasons 6 and 8); 23 episodes
2018	Run for Your Life	Julian Silva	Television film
2018	All In	Himself	Live appearance
2018	The Good Cop	Warren	Episode: "Will Cora Get Married?"
2018–2019	Orange Is the New Black	Danilo Stefanovic	Recurring role (seasons 6–7)
2019	God Friended Me	Austin	Episode: "The Fighter"
2019–2021	The Moodys	Marco	Recurring role
2019–2023	The Other Two	Lance Arroyo	Recurring role (seasons 1-2); Main cast (season 3)
2020	AJ and the Queen	Hector Ramirez / Damien Sanchez	Main role
2020	Katy Keene	Mateo Lopez	2 episodes
2020–2021	FBI	Nestor Vertiz	Recurring role
2022	She-Hulk: Attorney at Law	Augustus "Pug" Pugliese	Miniseries; 5 episodes
2023	Heels	Brooks Rizzo	Recurring role
2023–2024	The Big Door Prize	Giorgio	Main role
2024	Laid	Jeffrey	Episode: "Brandon from College"
2024–2025	Abbott Elementary	Manny Rivera	Recurring role
2025–2026	Animal Control	Parker	Recurring role
2025	Sirens	Raymond	Recurring role
2026–present	Best Medicine	Sheriff Mark Mylow	Main role

=== Video games ===
Year	Title	Role	Notes
2010	Red Dead Redemption	Abraham Reyes	
2010	Red Dead Redemption: Undead Nightmare	Abraham Reyes	
2013	Grand Theft Auto V	The Local Population	

== On stage ==
Year	Title	Role	Director	Venue	Notes	Ref.
2009	The Boys Upstairs	Eric	Justin Allen Pifer	The SoHo Playhouse	Part of The 13th Annual New York International Fringe Festival	
2009	Fat Camp	Brent	Alex Timbers	Acorn Theater	Part of 2009 New York Musical Theatre Festival	
2010	Pool Boy	Jack		Barrington Stage Company Stage	Staged reading	
2011	The Cook's Tour	Performer	Chris Henry	Urban Stage Theater	Staged reading	
2011	Lysistrata Jones	Mick	Dan Knechtges	The Gym at Judson		
2011–2012	Lysistrata Jones	Mick	Dan Knechtges	Walter Kerr Theatre	Broadway	
2012	Dogfight	Boland	Joe Mantello	Tony Kiser Theatre		
2013	Around the World in 80 Days	Phileas Fogg	Rachel Klein	YOW! Theater		
2015	On Your Feet!	Emilio Estefan	Jerry Mitchell	Marquis Theatre	Broadway	
