= Abbott Elementary =

American television sitcom (2021–present)

- Genre: Mockumentary; Workplace comedy; Sitcom; Comedy verite
- Created by: Quinta Brunson
- Showrunners: Patrick Schumacker; Justin Halpern; Quinta Brunson
- Starring: Quinta Brunson; Tyler James Williams; Janelle James; Lisa Ann Walter; Chris Perfetti; Sheryl Lee Ralph; William Stanford Davis
- Theme music composer: Maker
- Opening theme: "Hold'em"
- Country of origin: United States
- Original language: English
- No. of seasons: 6
- No. of episodes: 99 (list of episodes)

Production
- Executive producers: Randall Einhorn; Justin Halpern; Patrick Schumacker; Quinta Brunson
- Producers: Werner Walian; Josh Greene; Brittani Nichols; Scott Sites
- Cinematography: Kurt Jones; Mike Pepin
- Editors: Richie Edelson; Sarah Zeitlin; Elizabeth Praino; Ben Boles
- Camera setup: Single-camera
- Running time: 22 minutes
- Production companies: Delicious Non-Sequitur; Fifth Chance (2022–present); 20th Television; Warner Bros. Television

Original release
- Network: ABC
- Release: December 7, 2021 – present

Abbott Elementary is an American mockumentary sitcom television series created by Quinta Brunson for ABC. It stars Brunson as Janine Teagues, a perpetually optimistic second-grade teacher at the underfunded Abbott Elementary, a fictional predominantly black public school in West Philadelphia. The ensemble cast includes Tyler James Williams, Janelle James, Lisa Ann Walter, Chris Perfetti, William Stanford Davis, and Sheryl Lee Ralph.

The series premiered on December 7, 2021, and was met with critical acclaim and strong viewership numbers on Hulu and other delayed viewing methods. The show has been nominated for 37 Primetime Emmy Awards, winning four in the comedy series categories including Lead Actress for Brunson and Supporting Actress for Ralph. Abbott Elementary has also won three Golden Globe Awards, with acting wins for Brunson and Williams and the Golden Globe Award for Best Television Series – Musical or Comedy in 2023. In January 2023, the series was renewed for a third season consisting of 14 episodes, which premiered on February 7, 2024, with a two-episode premiere. Three days after the third season premiere, it was also renewed for a fourth season, which premiered on October 9, 2024, featuring a crossover with It's Always Sunny in Philadelphia.

On January 21, 2025, it was announced that Abbott Elementary was renewed for a fifth season, which premiered on October 1, 2025. On March 4, 2026, it was announced that the series was renewed for a sixth season, which premiered on October 7, 2026.

== Premise ==
Willard R. Abbott Elementary School is a predominantly black Philadelphia public school where a documentary crew is recording the lives of teachers working in underfunded, mismanaged schools. Conditions at the school are harsh and most teachers quit after their second year. Optimistic second-grade teacher Janine Teagues is determined to help her students despite the circumstances. She works with awkward, good-intentioned history teacher Jacob Hill; no-nonsense kindergarten teacher Barbara Howard; and second-grade teacher Melissa Schemmenti, Barbara's close friend who has questionable connections. They are joined by new school principal Ava Coleman – who is tone-deaf, unqualified, and uninvested – recent substitute hire Gregory Eddie, who was rejected when applying for the position of principal and Mr. Johnson - the quirky and sometimes enigmatic janitor of the school.

== Cast and characters ==
- Quinta Brunson as Janine Teagues, a second-grade teacher at Abbott who hopes to improve the lives of her students by making the best of the poor situation the school district makes teachers work in.
- Tyler James Williams as Gregory Eddie, at first a substitute for a recently fired first-grade teacher and later a full time teacher, who quickly harbors a crush on Janine.
- Janelle James as Ava Coleman, (Note: Ava Coleman is also the name of a real-life writer who contributes to the show. It is a coincidence that they share a name, as the writer was hired for the show in Season 2.) the school's tone-deaf principal who consistently bullies Janine and gives the staff reasons to believe she is poor at her job – a job she received after blackmailing the superintendent.
- Lisa Ann Walter as Melissa Schemmenti, a second-grade teacher at Abbott who has questionable connections with the Philly locals which she uses to help the school.
- Chris Perfetti as Jacob Hill, a sixth-grade history teacher who tries his best to help Janine with her plans to improve Abbott.
- Sheryl Lee Ralph as Barbara Howard, a religious kindergarten teacher, adamant about keeping with tradition, and a mother-figure to Janine.
- William Stanford Davis as Mr. Johnson (recurring season 1, starring season 2–present), the school's eccentric, overqualified, and talented custodian.

== Episodes ==
Season	Episodes	Originally released		Rank	Average viewers (in millions)
Season	Episodes	First released	Last released	Rank	Average viewers (in millions)
1	13	December 7, 2021	April 12, 2022	66	3.84
2	22	September 21, 2022	April 19, 2023	57	3.95
3	14	February 7, 2024	May 22, 2024	54	3.96
4	22	October 9, 2024	April 16, 2025	20	8.67 (Note: Beginning with the fourth season, viewership data was gathered from 35-day multiplatform ratings rather than 7-day linear ratings.)
5	22	October 1, 2025	April 22, 2026	46	8.1
6	TBA	October 7, 2026	TBA	TBA	TBA

== Production ==
=== Background ===
Brunson said that her mother's 40-year career as a schoolteacher inspired her to create Abbott Elementary, named after Joyce Abbott, one of her favorite elementary school teachers. The series is set in Brunson's hometown, Philadelphia. She said that Barbara Howard (played by Sheryl Lee Ralph) is based on her mother.

=== Development ===
On September 3, 2020, an untitled workplace comedy pilot starring Brunson landed a put pilot commitment at ABC with Brunson, Justin Halpern and Patrick Schumacker serving as executive producers.

In February 2021, ABC gave the project an official pilot order, originally with the title of Harrity Elementary. In May, the project was given a series order under a new name of Abbott Elementary. Filming for the first season began on August 16, 2021, in Los Angeles, California, and concluded on November 5, 2021. In August, three crew members tested positive for COVID-19 but production was not impacted.

The first season premiered on December 7, 2021, and concluded on April 12, 2022, consisting of 13 episodes. On March 14, 2022, just before the first season was set to conclude, the series was renewed for a second season. According to a tweet made by Quinta Brunson, the first day of filming for the second season began on July 18, 2022. On July 21, 2022, ABC ordered the second season of 22 episodes, giving it a full-season order. The second season premiered on September 21, 2022. On January 11, 2023, ABC renewed the series for a third season. In May 2023, the Writers Guild of America strike occurred which impacted on the production of third season. On November 10, 2023, ABC picked up the series for a full third season of 14 episodes. The third season premiered on February 7, 2024, with a two-episode premiere. Three days after the third season premiere, it was also renewed for a fourth season, which premiered on October 9, 2024.

On January 8, 2025, it was announced that Abbott Elementary would suspend production due to the wildfires in the Southern California region, where the show is filmed.

=== Casting ===
In March 2021, Tyler James Williams, Janelle James, Lisa Ann Walter, Chris Perfetti, and Sheryl Lee Ralph were announced to star in the series alongside Brunson. In November of the same year, William Stanford Davis was confirmed to recur as Mr. Johnson, the janitor.

In an interview with Insider, Brunson revealed that her character of Janine Teagues was originally planned to be just a side character in the series, as a staff member of Abbott. During the initial visions of the series, Barbara Howard was meant to be the "driving force" of the series.

And then [Warner Bros] said, 'You're crazy if you think we are buying the show without you in it, and I was like, 'Oh, okay. That's fair.' So, I had to put myself in it.

In July 2022, just months prior to the series returning for its second season, it was announced that Davis would be promoted to series regular for the season. Additionally, a week before the season premiere it was announced via The Wrap that the season would see the introduction of various recurring guest stars, including Lauren Weedman as Kristen Marie, Leslie Odom Jr. as Draemond Winding and Keyla Monterroso Mejia as Ashley Garcia, all of whom appeared within the first eight episodes of the season.

The second season also featured a cameo from Philadelphia Flyers mascot Gritty in the premiere episode, which garnered a large amount of online attention. When asked by the National Hockey League, executive producer Patrick Schumacker stated that Gritty's appearance in the series was "a long time coming." He revealed that Gritty was originally due to appear in one of the early episodes of the first season, but scheduling conflicts delayed the cameo.

"Gritty was always, from the start, a Philadelphia institution that we wanted to incorporate into the show," "The show takes place in Philly, and we try, as much as we can, to populate the show with the insider Philly, whether that's Philly slang or actual cameos from locals of note, like Jim Gardner, who's the now-retired anchor of ABC News over in Philadelphia. We try to make it as authentically local to Philadelphia as possible. Gritty was a no-brainer, and also at the top of the list."

On June 18, 2026, Quinta Brunson signed a big five-year deal with 20th Television and left Warner Bros. Television Studios. In October 2026, it was announced that Miranda Cosgrove, along with Edi Patterson and Ali Wong, was set to guest star in an Abbott Elementary episode.

=== Music ===
The series does not use any original music or score written or recorded for it, instead using pre-existing and/or library music, often used as diegetic music (or source music), often performed "live" by cast members. The previously released song "Hold'em", performed by Maker, was used as its main title theme.

== Release ==
=== Broadcast ===
In the US, the show airs on ABC and streams on Hulu with next-day availability and Disney+ through the Hulu content hub added by Disney in early 2024. The show also streams on HBO Max after each season completes its broadcast. In Australia and New Zealand the show was first released on Disney+ under the Star content hub on February 16 as a Star Original with a 6 episode premiere with new episodes weekly before airing in several countries in Europe such as UK, France, Italy and Germany.

In Canada, the series airs on Global, with episodes available to stream on StackTV and the Global TV app the next day. The first four seasons are currently available to stream on Disney+ under the Star content hub.

=== Home media ===
The first season was released by Warner Bros. Discovery Home Entertainment on October 18, 2022. The DVD has no special features. The second and third seasons were released on DVD in region 1 on September 12, 2023 and on April 1, 2025. The fourth season was released on April 21, 2026. The fifth season was released on October 20, 2026.

== Reception ==
=== Critical response ===
Critical response of Abbott Elementary
Season	Rotten Tomatoes	Metacritic
1	98% (46 reviews)	80 (16 reviews)
2	100% (23 reviews)	88 (10 reviews)
3	100% (11 reviews)	82 (7 reviews)
4	100% (9 reviews)	86 (4 reviews)

The series has average scores of 98% on Rotten Tomatoes and 83 on Metacritic.

On Rotten Tomatoes, the first season holds an approval rating of 98% with an average rating of 8.3 out of 10, based on 46 reviews. The site's critical consensus said, "Abbott Elementary earns top marks for its empathetic yet sidesplitting critique of the U.S. education system, plus some extra credit for a deftly handled will-they-won't-they dynamic." Metacritic, which uses a weighted average, assigned a score of 80 out of 100 based on 16 critics, indicating "generally favorable reviews".

Angie Han of The Hollywood Reporter said "[it] works well enough to deliver a consistent good time — and I suspect that given time, Abbott Elementary could blossom into something truly special". Han also said the first episodes "[show] a willingness to deal with class head on, while also finding humor in the characters' situations", and concluded that Abbott Elementary is "crowd-pleasing."

On Rotten Tomatoes, the second season has received an approval rating of 100% with an average rating of 9 out of 10, based on 23 reviews. The site's critical consensus reads, "Class is back in session and the plucky teachers of Abbott Elementary remain an absolute delight, with creator/star Quinta Brunson's savvy and sweet sensibility honed to perfection." Meanwhile, Metacritic has reported an average rating of 88 out of 100, based on ten reviews, indicating "universal acclaim".

On Rotten Tomatoes, the third season has received an approval rating of 100% based on 11 reviews. The site’s critical consensus reads, "Abbott Elementary has done its homework on sitcom longevity, finding fresh complications for its ragtag band of educators while deepening them as well-rounded people rather than comical caricatures." Meanwhile, Metacritic has reported an average rating of 82 out of 100, based on seven reviews, indicating "universal acclaim".

On Rotten Tomatoes, the fourth season has received an approval rating of 100% based on 9 reviews. Meanwhile, Metacritic has reported an average rating of 86 out of 100, based on four reviews, indicating "universal acclaim".

=== Ratings ===
Viewership and ratings per season of Abbott Elementary
Season	Timeslot (ET)	Episodes	First aired		Last aired		TV season	Viewership rank	Avg. viewers (millions)	18–49 rank	Avg. 18–49 rating
Season	Timeslot (ET)	Episodes	Date	Viewers (millions)	Date	Viewers (millions)	TV season	Viewership rank	Avg. viewers (millions)	18–49 rank	Avg. 18–49 rating
1	Tuesday 9:00 p.m.	13	December 7, 2021	2.88	April 12, 2022	2.78	2021–22	66	3.84	33	0.8
2	Wednesday 9:00 p.m.	22	September 21, 2022	2.92	April 19, 2023	2.90	2022–23	57	3.95	18	0.80
3	Wednesday 9:00 p.m.	14	February 7, 2024	2.81	May 22, 2024	2.62	2023–24	54	3.96	19	0.71
4	Wednesday 9:30 p.m. (2024); Wednesday 8:30 p.m. (2025)	22	October 9, 2024	2.13	April 16, 2025	2.19	2024–25	22	TBD	TBD	TBD
5	Wednesday 8:30 p.m.	22	October 1, 2025	2.83	April 22, 2026	N/A	2025–26	TBD	TBD	TBD	TBD
6	Wednesday 8:30 p.m.	22	October 7, 2026	2.24	TBA	TBD	2026–27	TBD	TBD	TBD	TBD

=== Accolades ===
Award	Year	Category	Nominee(s)	Result	Ref.
Critics' Choice Awards	2023	Best Comedy Series	Abbott Elementary	Won	
Critics' Choice Awards	2023	Best Actress in a Comedy Series	Quinta Brunson	Nominated	
Critics' Choice Awards	2023	Best Supporting Actor in a Comedy Series	Chris Perfetti	Nominated	
Critics' Choice Awards	2023	Best Supporting Actor in a Comedy Series	Tyler James Williams	Nominated	
Critics' Choice Awards	2023	Best Supporting Actress in a Comedy Series	Janelle James	Nominated	
Critics' Choice Awards	2023	Best Supporting Actress in a Comedy Series	Sheryl Lee Ralph	Won	
Critics' Choice Awards	2024	Best Comedy Series	Abbott Elementary	Nominated	
Critics' Choice Awards	2024	Best Actress in a Comedy Series	Quinta Brunson	Nominated	
Critics' Choice Awards	2024	Best Supporting Actress in a Comedy Series	Janelle James	Nominated	
Critics' Choice Awards	2024	Best Supporting Actress in a Comedy Series	Sheryl Lee Ralph	Nominated	
Critics' Choice Awards	2025	Best Comedy Series	Abbott Elementary	Nominated	
Critics' Choice Awards	2025	Best Actress in a Comedy Series	Quinta Brunson	Nominated	
Critics' Choice Awards	2025	Best Supporting Actor in a Comedy Series	Tyler James Williams	Nominated	
Critics' Choice Awards	2025	Best Supporting Actress in a Comedy Series	Janelle James	Nominated	
Critics' Choice Awards	2026	Best Comedy Series	Abbott Elementary	Nominated	
Critics' Choice Awards	2026	Best Supporting Actor in a Comedy Series	Chris Perfetti	Nominated	
Critics' Choice Awards	2026	Best Supporting Actress in a Comedy Series	Janelle James	Won	
Golden Globe Awards	2023	Best Television Series – Musical or Comedy	Abbott Elementary	Won	
Golden Globe Awards	2023	Best Actress in a Television Series – Musical or Comedy	Quinta Brunson	Won	
Golden Globe Awards	2023	Best Supporting Actor in a Television Series – Comedy/Musical or Drama	Tyler James Williams	Won	
Golden Globe Awards	2023	Best Supporting Actress in a Television Series – Comedy/Musical or Drama	Janelle James	Nominated	
Golden Globe Awards	2023	Best Supporting Actress in a Television Series – Comedy/Musical or Drama	Sheryl Lee Ralph	Nominated	
Golden Globe Awards	2024	Best Television Series – Musical or Comedy	Abbott Elementary	Nominated	
Golden Globe Awards	2024	Best Actress – Television Series Musical or Comedy	Quinta Brunson	Nominated	
Golden Globe Awards	2025	Best Television Series – Musical or Comedy	Abbott Elementary	Nominated	
Golden Globe Awards	2025	Best Actress – Television Series Musical or Comedy	Quinta Brunson	Nominated	
Golden Globe Awards	2026	Best Television Series – Musical or Comedy	Abbott Elementary	Nominated	
Peabody Awards	2023	Entertainment honorees	Abbott Elementary	Won	
Primetime Emmy Awards	2022	Outstanding Comedy Series	Quinta Brunson, Justin Halpern, Patrick Schumacker, Randall Einhorn, Brian Rubenstein, Scott Sites, and Jordan Temple	Nominated	
Primetime Emmy Awards	2022	Outstanding Lead Actress in a Comedy Series	Quinta Brunson (for "Pilot")	Nominated	
Primetime Emmy Awards	2022	Outstanding Supporting Actor in a Comedy Series	Tyler James Williams (for "Work Family")	Nominated	
Primetime Emmy Awards	2022	Outstanding Supporting Actress in a Comedy Series	Janelle James (for "Ava vs. Superintendent")	Nominated	
Primetime Emmy Awards	2022	Outstanding Supporting Actress in a Comedy Series	Sheryl Lee Ralph (for "New Tech")	Won	
Primetime Emmy Awards	2022	Outstanding Writing for a Comedy Series	Quinta Brunson (for "Pilot")	Won	
Primetime Emmy Awards	2023	Outstanding Comedy Series	Quinta Brunson, Justin Halpern, Patrick Schumacker, Randall Einhorn, Brian Rubenstein, Jordan Temple, Brittani Nichols, Josh Greene, and Scott Sites	Nominated	
Primetime Emmy Awards	2023	Outstanding Lead Actress in a Comedy Series	Quinta Brunson (for "Teacher Conference")	Won	
Primetime Emmy Awards	2023	Outstanding Supporting Actor in a Comedy Series	Tyler James Williams (for "Educator of the Year")	Nominated	
Primetime Emmy Awards	2023	Outstanding Supporting Actress in a Comedy Series	Janelle James (for "Fundraiser")	Nominated	
Primetime Emmy Awards	2023	Outstanding Supporting Actress in a Comedy Series	Sheryl Lee Ralph (for "Fire")	Nominated	
Primetime Emmy Awards	2024	Outstanding Comedy Series	Quinta Brunson, Justin Halpern, Patrick Schumacker, Randall Einhorn, Brian Rubenstein, Scott Sites, and Jordan Temple	Nominated	
Primetime Emmy Awards	2024	Outstanding Lead Actress in a Comedy Series	Quinta Brunson (for "Party")	Nominated	
Primetime Emmy Awards	2024	Outstanding Supporting Actor in a Comedy Series	Tyler James Williams (for "Double Date")	Nominated	
Primetime Emmy Awards	2024	Outstanding Supporting Actress in a Comedy Series	Janelle James (for "Career Day, Part 1")	Nominated	
Primetime Emmy Awards	2024	Outstanding Supporting Actress in a Comedy Series	Sheryl Lee Ralph (for "Librarian")	Nominated	
Primetime Emmy Awards	2024	Outstanding Directing for a Comedy Series	Randall Einhorn (for "Party")	Nominated	
Primetime Emmy Awards	2024	Outstanding Writing for a Comedy Series	Quinta Brunson (for "Career Day")	Nominated	
Primetime Emmy Awards	2025	Outstanding Comedy Series	Quinta Brunson, Patrick Schumacker, Justin Halpern, Randall Einhorn, Brian Rubenstein, Jordan Temple, Brittani Nichols, Josh Greene, Ava Coleman, Richie Edelson, and Scott Sites	Nominated	
Primetime Emmy Awards	2025	Outstanding Lead Actress in a Comedy Series	Quinta Brunson (for "Strike")	Nominated	
Primetime Emmy Awards	2025	Outstanding Supporting Actress in a Comedy Series	Janelle James (for "Music Class")	Nominated	
Primetime Emmy Awards	2025	Outstanding Supporting Actress in a Comedy Series	Sheryl Lee Ralph (for "100th Day of School")	Nominated	
Primetime Emmy Awards	2025	Outstanding Writing for a Comedy Series	Quinta Brunson (for "Back To School")	Nominated	
Primetime Emmy Awards	2026	Outstanding Comedy Series	Quinta Brunson, Justin Halpern, Patrick Schumacker, Randall Einhorn, Brian Rubenstein, Brittani Nichols, Ava Coleman, Josh Greene, Justin Tan, Kate Peterman, Joya McCrory, Richie Edelson, and Scott Sites	Nominated	
Primetime Emmy Awards	2026	Outstanding Lead Actress in a Comedy Series	Quinta Brunson	Nominated	
Primetime Emmy Awards	2026	Outstanding Supporting Actor in a Comedy Series	Tyler James Williams	Nominated	
Primetime Emmy Awards	2026	Outstanding Supporting Actress in a Comedy Series	Janelle James	Nominated	
Primetime Emmy Awards	2026	Outstanding Directing for a Comedy Series	Randall Einhorn (for "Ballgame")	Nominated	
Primetime Emmy Awards	2026	Outstanding Writing for a Comedy Series	Quinta Brunson (for "Team Building")	Nominated	
Primetime Creative Arts Emmy Awards	2022	Outstanding Casting for a Comedy Series	Wendy O'Brien	Won	
Primetime Creative Arts Emmy Awards	2023	Outstanding Casting for a Comedy Series	Wendy O'Brien and Chris Gehrt	Nominated	
Primetime Creative Arts Emmy Awards	2023	Outstanding Contemporary Hairstyling	Moira Frazier, Dustin Osborne, and Christina Joseph (for "Festival")	Nominated	
Primetime Creative Arts Emmy Awards	2023	Outstanding Guest Actress in a Comedy Series	Taraji P. Henson (for "Mom")	Nominated	
Primetime Creative Arts Emmy Awards	2024	Outstanding Casting for a Comedy Series	Wendy O'Brien and Chris Gehrt	Nominated	
Primetime Creative Arts Emmy Awards	2024	Outstanding Contemporary Hairstyling	Moira Frazier, Dustin Osborne, and Christina Joseph (for "Mother's Day")	Nominated	
Primetime Creative Arts Emmy Awards	2025	Outstanding Contemporary Hairstyling	Moira Frazier, Dustin Osborne, Christina Joseph, Charolette Noon, and Natita Stribling (for "100th Day Of School")	Nominated	
Primetime Creative Arts Emmy Awards	2026	Outstanding Casting for a Comedy Series	Wendy O'Brien and Chris Gehrt	Nominated	
Producers Guild of America Awards	2023	Outstanding Producer of Episodic Television, Comedy	Abbott Elementary	Nominated	
Screen Actors Guild Awards	2023	Outstanding Performance by a Female Actor in a Comedy Series	Quinta Brunson	Nominated	
Screen Actors Guild Awards	2023	Outstanding Performance by an Ensemble in a Comedy Series	Quinta Brunson, William Stanford Davis, Janelle James, Chris Perfetti, Sheryl Lee Ralph, Lisa Ann Walter, and Tyler James Williams	Won	
Screen Actors Guild Awards	2024	Outstanding Performance by a Female Actor in a Comedy Series	Quinta Brunson	Nominated	
Screen Actors Guild Awards	2024	Outstanding Performance by an Ensemble in a Comedy Series	Quinta Brunson, William Stanford Davis, Janelle James, Chris Perfetti, Sheryl Lee Ralph, Lisa Ann Walter, and Tyler James Williams	Nominated	
Screen Actors Guild Awards	2025	Outstanding Performance by a Female Actor in a Comedy Series	Quinta Brunson	Nominated	
Screen Actors Guild Awards	2025	Outstanding Performance by an Ensemble in a Comedy Series	Quinta Brunson, William Stanford Davis, Janelle James, Chris Perfetti, Sheryl Lee Ralph, Lisa Ann Walter, and Tyler James Williams	Nominated	
Screen Actors Guild Awards	2026	Outstanding Performance by an Ensemble in a Comedy Series	Quinta Brunson, William Stanford Davis, Janelle James, Chris Perfetti, Sheryl Lee Ralph, Lisa Ann Walter, and Tyler James Williams	Nominated	
Writers Guild of America Award	2023	New Series	Quinta Brunson, Ava Coleman, Riley Dufurrena, Justin Halpern, Joya McCrory, Morgan Murphy, Brittani Nichols, Kate Peterman, Brian Rubenstein, Patrick Schumacker, Justin Tan, Jordan Temple, and Garrett Werner	Nominated	
Writers Guild of America Award	2023	Comedy Series	Quinta Brunson, Ava Coleman, Riley Dufurrena, Justin Halpern, Joya McCrory, Morgan Murphy, Brittani Nichols, Kate Peterman, Brian Rubenstein, Patrick Schumacker, Justin Tan, Jordan Temple, and Garrett Werner	Nominated	
Writers Guild of America Award	2024	Comedy Series	Quinta Brunson, Ava Coleman, Riley Dufurrena, Justin Halpern, Joya McCrory, Morgan Murphy, Brittani Nichols, Kate Peterman, Brian Rubenstein, Patrick Schumacker, Justin Tan, Jordan Temple, and Garrett Werner	Nominated	
Writers Guild of America Award	2025	Comedy Series	Quinta Brunson, Ava Coleman, Riley Dufurrena, Justin Halpern, Joya McCrory, Chad Morton, Morgan Murphy, Brittani Nichols, Rebekka Pesqueira, Kate Peterman, Brian Rubenstein, Patrick Schumacker, Justin Tan, Jordan Temple, Garrett Werner	Nominated	
Writers Guild of America Award	2026	Comedy Series	Quinta Brunson, Ava Coleman, Lizzy Darrell, Riley Dufurrena, Justin Halpern, Joya McCrory, Chad Morton, Morgan Murphy, Brittani Nichols, Rebekka Pesqueira, Kate Peterman, Brian Rubenstein, Patrick Schumacker, Justin Tan, Jordan Temple, Garrett Werner	Nominated	
