= Chris Perfetti =

American actor (born 1988)

- Perfetti in 2026
- Born: December 12, 1988 (age 37); Rochester, New York, U.S.
- Education: State University of New York, Purchase (BFA)
- Occupation: Actor
- Years active: 2012–present

Chris Perfetti (born December 12, 1988) is an American actor. As of 2026, he portrays Jacob Hill on the ABC comedy Abbott Elementary, for which he was nominated for a Critics' Choice Award and won a Screen Actors Guild Award. His other roles include Tim Fletch on the NBC series Crossbones (2014), Brady on the HBO series Looking (2015), and Ben on The CW series In the Dark (2020).

== Early life and education ==
Chris Perfetti was born in Rochester, New York. He is of Italian descent. He was raised in Webster, New York, and attended Webster Schroeder High School. He is a graduate of the Conservatory of Theater at the State University of New York at Purchase, where he was a classmate of Micah Stock and Zoe Kravitz.

== Career ==
Perfetti has appeared in Sons of the Prophet by playwright Stephen Karam, playing the role of Charlie. For his work as Charlie, he received a Theatre World Award for Best Debut Performance in an Off-Broadway play. Starting in December 2012, Perfetti played Bomber in the revival of Picnic by William Inge. Perfetti appeared as Ariel in The Tempest at the Delacorte Theater in the summer of 2015. He also appeared in the indie drama film The Surrogate and Minyan.

Perfetti is also known for starring in Submissions Only (2010), Next Caller (2012), the NBC series Crossbones (2014) as series regular Tim Fletch, and as the character Brady in the second season of the HBO show Looking (2015), and its subsequent series finale television film, Looking: The Movie (2016).

== Personal life ==
In a speech at the 2026 GLAAD Awards, Abbott Elementary creator Quinta Brunson revealed that Perfetti proudly told her he is gay while she was getting his thoughts on his character in the show being gay.

== Work ==
=== Film ===
Year	Title	Role	Notes
2019	Please Come with Me	Patrick	
2019	Sound of Metal	Harlan	
2020	Minyan	Eric	
2020	The Surrogate	Josh	
2021	The Virtuoso	The Motel Clerk	
2023	The Anne Frank Gift Shop	Ben	Short film
2025	Twinless	George	

=== Television ===
Year	Title	Role	Notes
2012	Submissions Only	Party Goer	Episode: "Woof!"
2012–2013	Next Caller	Cody	5 episodes
2014	Crossbones	Tim Fletch	9 episodes
2015	Looking	Brady	4 episodes
2016	Blue Bloods	ADA Elliot Pinsky	Episode: "Help Me, Help You"
2016	Looking: The Movie	Brady	Television film
2016	The Night Of	Lawyer / Cooper	3 episodes
2018	Gotham	Cosmo Krank	Episode: "A Dark Knight: Pieces of a Broken Mirror"
2018	Bull	ADA Frank Russo	Episode: "But for the Grace"
2019	What We Do in the Shadows	Kyle	Episode: "City Council"
2020	In the Dark	Ben	Recurring role; 11 episodes
2021	Bonding	Patrick	Episode: "Threesomes"
2021	The Resident	Phillip Bondman	3 episodes
2021–present	Abbott Elementary	Jacob Hill	Main role
2025	It's Always Sunny in Philadelphia	Jacob Hill	Episode: "The Gang F***s Up Abbott Elementary"
2026	DTF St. Louis	Kevin Van Der Lonse / "Tiger Tiger"	2 episodes

=== Theatre ===
Year	Title	Role	Venue	Ref.
2011	Sons of the Prophet	Charles	Laura Pels Theatre	
2015	The Tempest	Ariel	Delacorte Theatre	
2015	Cloud Nine	Betty/Edward	Linda Gross Theatre	
2017	Everybody	Performer	Signature Theatre	
2017	Six Degrees of Separation	Trent	Ethel Barrymore Theatre	
2018	The Low Road	Jim Trewitt	Public Theater	
2019	Moscow Moscow Moscow Moscow Moscow Moscow	Masha	Robert W. Wilson MCC Theater Space	
2022	King James	Matt	Steppenwolf Theatre	
2023	Inherit the Wind	E.K. Hornbeck	Pasadena Playhouse	
2025	Good Sex	Actor	Powerhouse: International	

== Awards and nominations ==
Year	Ceremony	Category	Title	Work	Ref.
2012	Theatre World Award	Outstanding Debut Performance	Sons of the Prophet	Won	
2020	Drama Desk Award	Outstanding Featured Actor in a Play	Moscow Moscow Moscow Moscow Moscow Moscow	Nominated	
2022	Peabody Award	Entertainment	Abbott Elementary	Won	
2023	Critics' Choice Awards	Best Supporting Actor in a Comedy Series	Abbott Elementary	Nominated	
2023	Screen Actors Guild Awards	Outstanding Performance by an Ensemble in a Comedy Series	Abbott Elementary	Won	
2024	Screen Actors Guild Awards	Outstanding Performance by an Ensemble in a Comedy Series	Abbott Elementary	Nominated	
2025	Critics' Choice Awards	Best Supporting Actor in a Comedy Series	Abbott Elementary	Nominated	
