= Janelle James =

American comedian (born 1979)

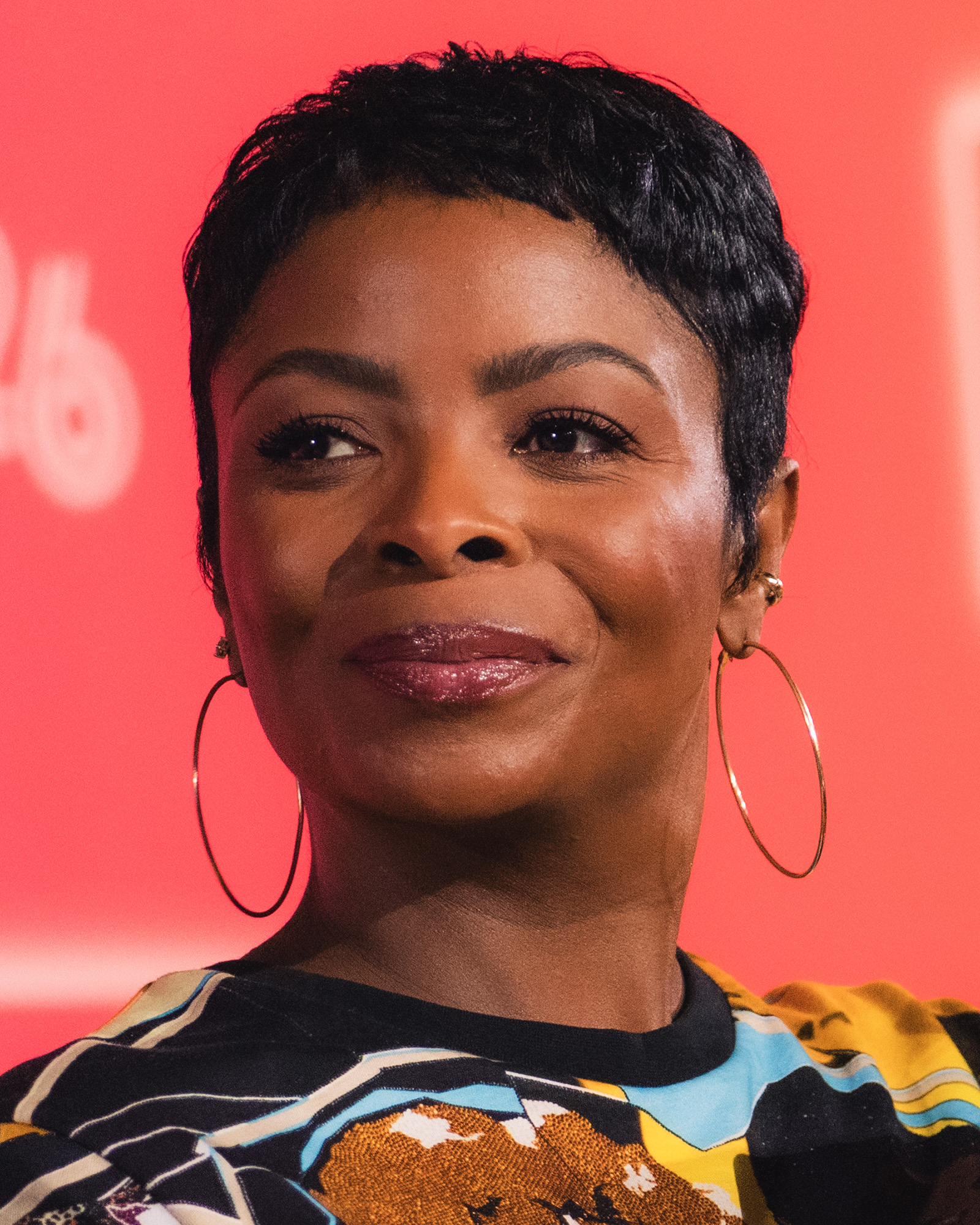
- James in 2026
- Born: September 23, 1979 (age 47); Saint Thomas, U.S. Virgin Islands
- Education: Fashion Institute of Technology
- Occupations: Comedian; writer; actress
- Years active: 2009–present
- Children: 2

Janelle James (born September 23, 1979) is an American comedian, actress, and writer. She is best known for her role as Ava Coleman in the ABC television series Abbott Elementary, for which she won a Critics Choice Award, a Screen Actors Guild Award, and two NAACP Image Awards, in addition to nominations for five Primetime Emmy Awards, and a Golden Globe Award.

Her writing credits include The Rundown with Robin Thede and Black Monday, and she acted on the programs Crashing, Corporate, and Central Park. Her debut comedy album Black and Mild was released in 2017. She was named one of Variety's 10 Comics to Watch for 2020.

== Early life and education ==
James was born and raised on Saint Thomas, U.S. Virgin Islands. Her father had a food truck, and starting at age 7, she helped out by selling beers on the beach to tourists. At age 16, she and her mother moved to New York. While in high school, she once stood in line for 12 hours to audition for MTV's Wanna Be a VJ. After high school, she enrolled at the Fashion Institute of Technology, but left after a few years.

== Career ==
James began her career in 2009 at an open mic she attended while living in Champaign, Illinois. She described her style of comedy as "just talking shit" and her stand-up includes a range of topics such as the Trump administration, motherhood, being a woman over 35, and dating. James named Bill Burr, Hadiyah Robinson, John Early, Wanda Sykes, Richard Pryor, and Kareem Green as favorite comedians.

In 2016, James' work was recognized by Just for Laughs and Brooklyn magazine. She gained wider prominence as the opening act for Chris Rock's 2017 Total Blackout tour. That year, she released her debut comedy album, Black and Mild. The show was recorded at Acme Comedy Company in Minneapolis.

She performed on Netflix's 2018 comedy series The Comedy Lineup. In 2019, she hosted Strong Black Laughs, an interview podcast featuring a variety of established Black comedians, including Luenell and Sherri Shepherd. She hosted You In Danger, Gurl, a comedy podcast about relationship red flags and bizarre dating experiences, in 2020.

James was a staff writer for The Rundown with Robin Thede (2017) and the Showtime comedy Black Monday, and also acted in a recurring role on the show. She has also appeared on the shows Crashing, Corporate, and is both a writer and voice actor for Central Park. She was also slated to perform at the network's inaugural Netflix Is a Joke comedy festival based in Los Angeles in 2020. She was a featured comic on Netflix's The Standups in 2021.

She gained wide prominence in her role as a main cast member on the ABC comedy Abbott Elementary. Her performance as the self-involved principal Ava Coleman has been hailed by critics. James garnered award nominations including a Primetime Emmy Award for Best Supporting Actress in a Comedy Series, a TCA Award for Individual Achievement in Comedy, a Golden Globe Award, and a Critics' Choice Award.

In 2022, James hosted the ABC game show The Final Straw. She hosted the 2023 Writers Guild of America Awards. She appeared as a supporting character in the 2025 buddy comedy One of Them Days. James is a voice actress for the principal character Sheila Flambé on the Netflix series Strip Law.

Her comedy special How Romantic released in November 2026. James conceptualized, scripted, and voice acted her role as a host of the fictitious radio show She Got Assets in the 2026 video game Grand Theft Auto VI.

== Personal life ==
After college, James married a teacher, with whom she had two sons. They separated while living in Champaign, Illinois. For many years she was based in Brooklyn, New York, but moved to Los Angeles in 2022 after the success of Abbott Elementary's first season.

== Awards and nominations ==
- 2016 – Brooklyn's 50 Funniest People
- 2016 – Just for Laughs New Faces
- 2020 – Variety's 10 Comics to Watch

| Year | Award | Category | Nominated work | Result | Ref. |
|---|---|---|---|---|---|
| 2022 | Black Reel Awards for Television | Outstanding Supporting Actress, Comedy Series | Abbott Elementary | Won | |
| 2022 | Dorian Awards | Best Supporting TV Performance | Abbott Elementary | Nominated | |
| 2022 | Gotham Independent Film Awards | Outstanding Performance in a New Series | Abbott Elementary | Nominated | |
| 2022 | Hollywood Critics Association TV Awards | Best Supporting Actress in a Broadcast Network or Cable Series, Comedy | Abbott Elementary | Won | |
| 2022 | Primetime Emmy Awards | Outstanding Supporting Actress in a Comedy Series | Abbott Elementary | Nominated | |
| 2022 | TCA Awards | Individual Achievement in Comedy | Abbott Elementary | Nominated | |
| 2023 | Critics' Choice Television Awards | Best Supporting Actress in a Comedy Series | Abbott Elementary | Nominated | |
| 2023 | Golden Globe Awards | Best Supporting Actress – Television Series | Abbott Elementary | Nominated | |
| 2023 | Independent Spirit Awards | Best Supporting Performance in a New Scripted Series | Abbott Elementary | Nominated | |
| 2023 | NAACP Image Awards | Outstanding Supporting Actress in a Comedy Series | Abbott Elementary | Won | |
| 2023 | Primetime Emmy Awards | Outstanding Supporting Actress in a Comedy Series | Abbott Elementary | Nominated | |
| 2023 | Screen Actors Guild Awards | Outstanding Performance by an Ensemble in a Comedy Series | Abbott Elementary | Won | |
| 2024 | Critics' Choice Television Awards | Best Supporting Actress in a Comedy Series | Abbott Elementary | Nominated | |
| 2024 | Primetime Emmy Awards | Outstanding Supporting Actress in a Comedy Series | Abbott Elementary | Nominated | |
| 2024 | Screen Actors Guild Awards | Outstanding Performance by an Ensemble in a Comedy Series | Abbott Elementary | Nominated | |
| 2025 | Screen Actors Guild Awards | Outstanding Performance by an Ensemble in a Comedy Series | Abbott Elementary | Nominated | |
| 2025 | Critics' Choice Television Awards | Best Supporting Actress in a Comedy Series | Abbott Elementary | Nominated | |
| 2025 | Primetime Emmy Awards | Outstanding Supporting Actress in a Comedy Series | Abbott Elementary | Nominated | |
| 2026 | Critics' Choice Television Awards | Best Supporting Actress in a Comedy Series | Abbott Elementary | Won | |
| 2026 | NAACP Image Awards | Outstanding Supporting Actress in a Comedy Series | Abbott Elementary | Won | |
| 2026 | NAACP Image Awards | Outstanding Supporting Actress in a Motion Picture | One of Them Days | Nominated | |
| 2026 | Primetime Emmy Awards | Outstanding Supporting Actress in a Comedy Series | Abbott Elementary | Nominated | |

== Discography ==
- 2017: Black and Mild

== Filmography ==
=== Television ===
| Year | Title | Role | Notes |
|---|---|---|---|
| 2017 | The Rundown with Robin Thede | N/A | Writer |
| 2017 | Crashing | Julie | 1 episode |
| 2018 | The Comedy Line-Up | Herself | Stand-up special |
| 2019 | Laff Mobb's Laff Tracks | Herself | 1 episode |
| 2020–2021 | Black Monday | Joyce | Recurring role, 4 episodes; also writer |
| 2020 | Corporate | Maggie | 1 episode |
| 2020–2022 | Central Park | Investor #2, Fran, Martha | Voice, recurring role, 11 episodes; also writer |
| 2021–present | Abbott Elementary | Ava Coleman | Main role |
| 2021 | The Standups | Herself | Stand-up special |
| 2022 | Life & Beth | Aminata | 1 episode |
| 2022 | Tuca & Bertie | Partridgina | Voice, 1 episode |
| 2023 | Star Trek: Lower Decks | Katrot | Voice, 1 episode |
| 2024 | Monsters at Work | Joy | Voice, 4 episodes |
| 2024 | Kite Man: Hell Yeah! | Queen of Fables | Voice |
| 2025 | It's Always Sunny in Philadelphia | Ava Coleman | Episode: "The Gang F***s Up Abbott Elementary" |
| 2025 | Super Duper Bunny League | Narrator | Voice, first bridge series |
| 2026 | Strip Law | Sheila Flambé | Voice, main role |

=== Film ===
| Year | Title | Role | Notes |
|---|---|---|---|
| 2020 | Tom of Your Life | Agent Parker | |
| 2024 | The Garfield Movie | Olivia | Voice Role |
| 2025 | One of Them Days | Ruby | |

=== Video games ===
| Year | Title | Role | Notes |
|---|---|---|---|
| 2026 | Grand Theft Auto VI | "The Wipe" Radio host | Voice |
