= List of Abbott Elementary episodes =

Abbott Elementary is an American television sitcom created by Quinta Brunson for ABC. It stars Brunson as a second grade teacher at Abbott Elementary, a fictional predominantly Black public school in Philadelphia. The ensemble cast includes Tyler James Williams, Janelle James, Lisa Ann Walter, Chris Perfetti, Sheryl Lee Ralph and William Stanford Davis.

As of November 11, 2026, 99 episodes of Abbott Elementary have aired, currently in its sixth season.

== Series overview ==
Season	Episodes	Originally released		Rank	Average viewers (in millions)
Season	Episodes	First released	Last released	Rank	Average viewers (in millions)
1	13	December 7, 2021	April 12, 2022	66	3.84
2	22	September 21, 2022	April 19, 2023	57	3.95
3	14	February 7, 2024	May 22, 2024	54	3.96
4	22	October 9, 2024	April 16, 2025	20	8.67 (Note: Beginning with the fourth season, viewership data was gathered from 35-day multiplatform ratings rather than 7-day linear ratings.)
5	22	October 1, 2025	April 22, 2026	46	8.1
6	TBA	October 7, 2026	TBA	TBA	TBA

== Episodes ==
=== Season 1 (2021–22) ===
No. overall	No. in season	Title	Directed by	Written by	Original release date	Prod. code	U.S. viewers (millions)
1	1	"Pilot"	Randall Einhorn	Quinta Brunson	December 7, 2021	T11.10144	2.88
2	2	"Light Bulb"	Randall Einhorn	Quinta Brunson	January 4, 2022	T12.17153	3.45
3	3	"Wishlist"	Randall Einhorn	Morgan Murphy	January 11, 2022	T12.17154	2.97
4	4	"New Tech"	Randall Einhorn	Brian Rubenstein	January 18, 2022	T12.17152	3.02
5	5	"Student Transfer"	Randall Einhorn	Brittani Nichols	January 25, 2022	T12.17155	3.06
6	6	"Gifted Program"	Matt Sohn	Jordan Temple	February 1, 2022	T12.17156	2.77
7	7	"Art Teacher"	Jennifer Celotta	Kate Peterman	February 8, 2022	T12.17157	2.61
8	8	"Work Family"	Jay Karas	Justin Tan	February 15, 2022	T12.17158	2.31
9	9	"Step Class"	Shahrzad Davani	Joya McCrory	February 22, 2022	T12.17159	3.06
10	10	"Open House"	Jennifer Celotta	Brian Rubenstein	March 22, 2022	T12.17160	2.64
11	11	"Desking"	Melissa Kosar	Morgan Murphy	March 29, 2022	T12.17161	2.54
12	12	"Ava vs. Superintendent"	Matthew A. Cherry	Brittani Nichols	April 5, 2022	T12.17162	2.58
13	13	"Zoo Balloon"	Randall Einhorn	Jordan Temple	April 12, 2022	T12.17163	2.78

=== Season 2 (2022–23) ===
No. overall	No. in season	Title	Directed by	Written by	Original release date	Prod. code	U.S. viewers (millions)
14	1	"Development Day"	Randall Einhorn	Quinta Brunson	September 21, 2022	T12.17551	2.92
15	2	"Wrong Delivery"	Randall Einhorn	Brian Rubenstein	September 28, 2022	T12.17552	2.54
16	3	"Story Samurai"	Jay Karas	Jordan Temple	October 5, 2022	T12.17553	2.63
17	4	"Principal's Office"	Shahrzad Davani	Brittani Nichols	October 12, 2022	T12.17554	2.63
18	5	"Juice"	Jay Karas	Ava Coleman	October 19, 2022	T12.17555	2.54
19	6	"Candy Zombies"	Shahrzad Davani	Kate Peterman	October 26, 2022	T12.17556	2.88
20	7	"Attack Ad"	Matt Sohn	Justin Tan	November 2, 2022	T12.17557	2.66
21	8	"Egg Drop"	Randall Einhorn	Joya McCrory	November 16, 2022	T12.17558	2.66
22	9	"Sick Day"	Randall Einhorn	Riley Dufurrena	November 30, 2022	T12.17559	2.56
23	10	"Holiday Hookah"	Randall Einhorn	Brian Rubenstein	December 7, 2022	T12.17560	2.63
24	11	"Read-A-Thon"	Dime Davis	Garrett Werner	January 4, 2023	T12.17561	3.12
25	12	"Fight"	Melissa Kosar	Jordan Temple	January 11, 2023	T12.17562	2.94
26	13	"Fundraiser"	Randall Einhorn	Brittani Nichols	January 18, 2023	T12.17563	3.05
27	14	"Valentine's Day"	Justin Tan	Justin Tan	February 8, 2023	T12.17565	3.22
28	15	"Fire"	Jennifer Celotta	Ava Coleman	February 15, 2023	T12.17564	2.76
29	16	"Teacher Conference"	Randall Einhorn	Kate Peterman	February 22, 2023	T12.17566	2.62
30	17	"Mural Arts"	Geeta Malik	Joya McCrory	March 1, 2023	T12.17567	2.48
31	18	"Teacher Appreciation"	Randall Einhorn	Morgan Murphy	March 8, 2023	T12.17568	2.79
32	19	"Festival"	Randall Einhorn	Brian Rubenstein	March 15, 2023	T12.17569	2.67
33	20	"Educator of the Year"	Claire Scanlon	Jordan Temple	April 5, 2023	T12.17570	2.72
34	21	"Mom"	Ken Whittingham	Ava Coleman	April 12, 2023	T12.17571	2.74
35	22	"Franklin Institute"	Randall Einhorn	Brittani Nichols	April 19, 2023	T12.17572	2.90

=== Season 3 (2024) ===
No. overall	No. in season	Title	Directed by	Written by	Original release date	Prod. code	U.S. viewers (millions)
36	1	"Career Day"	Randall Einhorn	Quinta Brunson	February 7, 2024	T12.18301	2.81
37	2	"Career Day"	Randall Einhorn	Quinta Brunson	February 7, 2024	T12.18302	2.81
38	3	"Gregory's Garden Goofballs"	Justin Tan	Brian Rubenstein	February 14, 2024	T12.18303	2.71
39	4	"Smoking"	Randall Einhorn	Jordan Temple	February 21, 2024	T12.18304	2.34
40	5	"Breakup"	Jen Celotta	Brittani Nichols	February 28, 2024	T12.18305	2.33
41	6	"Willard R. Abbott"	Matt Sohn	Ava Coleman	March 10, 2024	T12.18307	6.90
42	7	"Librarian"	Karan Soni	Morgan Murphy	March 13, 2024	T12.18306	2.27
43	8	"Panel"	Claire Scanlon	Kate Peterman	March 20, 2024	T12.18308	2.29
44	9	"Alex"	Randall Einhorn	Justin Tan	April 10, 2024	T12.18309	2.27
45	10	"2 Ava 2 Fest"	Ken Whittingham	Joya McCroy	April 17, 2024	T12.18310	2.24
46	11	"Double Date"	Razan Ghalayini	Garrett Werner	May 1, 2024	T12.18311	2.49
47	12	"Mother's Day"	Richie Edelson	Riley Dufurrena	May 8, 2024	T12.18312	2.67
48	13	"Smith Playground"	Jaime Eliezer Karas	Brian Rubenstein	May 15, 2024	T12.18313	2.33
49	14	"Party"	Randall Einhorn	Chad Morton & Rebekka Pesqueira	May 22, 2024	T12.18314	2.62

=== Season 4 (2024–25) ===
No. overall	No. in season	Title	Directed by	Written by	Original release date	Prod. code	U.S. viewers (millions)
50	1	"Back to School"	Randall Einhorn	Quinta Brunson	October 9, 2024	T12.19401	2.13
51	2	"Ringworm"	Randall Einhorn	Brian Rubenstein	October 16, 2024	T12.19402	2.00
52	3	"Class Pet"	Matt Sohn	Jordan Temple	October 23, 2024	T12.19403	1.91
53	4	"Costume Contest"	Randall Einhorn	Brittani Nichols	October 30, 2024	T12.19404	1.89
54	5	"Dad Fight"	Justin Tan	Ava Coleman	November 6, 2024	T12.19405	2.04
55	6	"The Deli"	Patrick Schumacker	Kate Peterman	November 13, 2024	T12.19406	2.21
56	7	"Winter Show"	Randall Einhorn	Justin Tan	December 4, 2024	T12.19407	2.91
57	8	"Winter Break"	Randall Einhorn	Joya McCrory	December 4, 2024	T12.19408	2.59
58	9	"Volunteers"	Randall Einhorn	Garrett Werner	January 8, 2025	T12.19409	3.76
59	10	"Testing"	Randall Keenan Winston	Morgan Murphy	January 15, 2025	T12.19410	2.85
60	11	"Strike"	Jennifer Celotta	Riley Dufurrena	January 22, 2025	T12.19411	2.91
61	12	"Girard Creek"	Randall Einhorn	Chad Morton	January 29, 2025	T12.19412	2.63
62	13	"The Science Fair"	Tyler James Williams	Brian Rubenstein	February 5, 2025	T12.19413	2.72
63	14	"District Budget Meeting"	Richie Edelson	Rebekka Pesqueira	February 12, 2025	T12.19414	2.72
64	15	"100th Day of School"	Randall Einhorn	Lizzy Darrell	February 26, 2025	T12.19415	2.33
65	16	"Books"	Dime Davis	Jordan Temple	March 5, 2025	T12.19416	2.42
66	17	"Karaoke"	Matthew Pexa	Brittani Nichols	March 12, 2025	T12.19417	2.52
67	18	"Audit"	Jaime Eliezer Karas	Ava Coleman	March 19, 2025	T12.19418	2.46
68	19	"Music Class"	Brittani Nichols	Kate Peterman	March 26, 2025	T12.19419	2.28
69	20	"Ava Fest: Tokyo Drift"	Randall Einhorn	Justin Tan	April 2, 2025	T12.19420	2.33
70	21	"Rally"	Claire Scanlon	Joya McCrory	April 9, 2025	T12.19421	2.48
71	22	"Please Touch Museum"	Randall Einhorn	Riley Dufurrena & Garrett Werner	April 16, 2025	T12.19422	2.19

=== Season 5 (2025–26) ===
No. overall	No. in season	Title	Directed by	Written by	Original release date	Prod. code	U.S. viewers (millions)
72	1	"Team Building"	Randall Einhorn	Quinta Brunson	October 1, 2025	T12.19501	2.83
73	2	"Cheating"	Randall Einhorn	Brian Rubenstein	October 8, 2025	T12.19502	2.34
74	3	"Ballgame"	Randall Einhorn	Ava Coleman	October 15, 2025	T12.19504	2.83
75	4	"Game Night"	Randall Einhorn	Brittani Nichols	October 22, 2025	T12.19503	2.86
76	5	"Camping"	Matthew Pexa	Kate Peterman	October 29, 2025	T12.19505	2.41
77	6	"No Phones"	Randall Einhorn	Joya McCrory	November 5, 2025	T12.19506	2.36
78	7	"Goofgirl"	Justin Tan	Justin Tan	December 3, 2025	T12.19507	2.29
79	8	"Birthday"	Matt Sohn	Garrett Werner	December 10, 2025	T12.19508	2.52
80	9	"Mall"	Randall Einhorn	Riley Dufurrena	January 7, 2026	T12.19509	2.74
81	10	"Mall Part 2: Questions & Concerns"	Tyler James Williams	Chad Morton	January 14, 2026	T12.19510	2.81
82	11	"Mall Part 3: Heroes"	Jennifer Celotta	Rebekka Pesqueira	January 21, 2026	T12.19511	2.83
83	12	"Picture Day"	Randall Einhorn	Lizzy Darrell	January 28, 2026	T12.19512	2.70
84	13	"Candygrams"	Randall Einhorn	Chad Morton & Rebekka Pesqueira	February 4, 2026	T12.19514	2.83
85	14	"Aide"	Richie Edelson	Megan Carroll	March 4, 2026	T12.19513	2.52
86	15	"Safety Day"	Dime Davis	Garrett Werner	March 11, 2026	T12.19515	2.32
87	16	"Campaign"	Brittani Nichols	Riley Dufurrena	March 18, 2026	T12.19516	2.40
88	17	"No Homework"	Jeff Gonzalez	Justin Tan	March 25, 2026	T12.19517	2.49
89	18	"April Fools"	Claire Scanlon	Joya McCroy	April 1, 2026	T12.19518	2.48
90	19	"Trip"	Razan Ghalayini	Ava Coleman	April 8, 2026	T12.19519	2.41
91	20	"Night Out"	Randall Einhorn	Kate Peterman	April 15, 2026	T12.19520	2.37
92	21	"Ava & Fest"	Patrick Schumacker	Brittani Nichols	April 22, 2026	T12.19521	2.73
93	22	"Miami"	Randall Einhorn	Brian Rubenstein	April 22, 2026	T12.19522	2.41

=== Season 6 (2026) ===
No. overall	No. in season	Title	Directed by	Written by	Original release date	Prod. code	Viewers (millions)
94	1	"Jungle Classroom"	Randall Einhorn	Quinta Brunson	October 7, 2026	T12.20601	2.22
95	2	"Check-Ins"	Randall Einhorn	Ava Coleman	October 14, 2026	T12.20602	2.24
96	3	"Tryouts"	Justin Tan	Justin Tan	October 21, 2026	T12.20603	2.69
97	4	"Halloween Party"	Randall Einhorn	Joya McCroy	October 28, 2026	T12.20604	2.31
98	5	"Courtney"	Jeff Gonzalez	Kate Peterman	November 4, 2026	T12.20605	TBD
99	6	"Competition"	TBA	Garrett Werner	November 11, 2026	T12.20606	TBD
100	7	"One Hundred"	Randall Einhorn	Riley Dufurrena	December 2, 2026	T12.20607	TBD
101	8	"Parents"	TBA	TBA	December 9, 2026	T12.20608	TBD

== Ratings ==
Abbott Elementary : U.S. viewers per episode (millions)

Season	Episode number																						Average
Season	1	2	3	4	5	6	7	8	9	10	11	12	13	14	15	16	17	18	19	20	21	22	Average
1	2.88	3.45	2.97	3.02	3.06	2.77	2.61	2.31	3.06	2.64	2.54	2.58	2.78	–									2.82
2	2.92	2.54	2.63	2.63	2.54	2.88	2.66	2.66	2.56	2.63	3.12	2.94	3.05	3.22	2.76	2.62	2.48	2.79	2.67	2.72	2.74	2.90	2.76
3	2.81	2.81	2.71	2.34	2.33	6.90	2.27	2.29	2.27	2.24	2.49	2.67	2.33	2.62	–								2.79
4	2.13	2.00	1.91	1.89	2.04	2.21	2.91	2.59	3.76	2.85	2.91	2.63	2.72	2.72	2.33	2.42	2.52	2.46	2.28	2.33	2.48	2.19	2.46
5	2.83	2.34	2.83	2.86	2.41	2.36	2.29	2.52	2.74	2.81	2.83	2.70	2.83	2.52	2.32	2.40	2.49	2.48	2.41	2.37	2.73	2.41	2.57
6	2.24	TBD	TBD	TBD	TBD	TBD	TBD	TBD	TBD	TBD	TBD	TBD	TBD	TBD	TBD	TBD	TBD	TBD	TBD	TBD	TBD	TBD	TBD

Audience measurement performed by Nielsen Media Research
