= Wish list (disambiguation) =

A wish list is a list of goods or services that a person or organization desires.

Wish list or wishlist may also refer to:

- "Wish List" (song), a 2025 song by Taylor Swift from The Life of a Showgirl
- "Wishlist" (song), a 1998 song by Pearl Jam
- "Wishlist" (Abbott Elementary), a 2022 TV episode
- "Wishlist", a 2024 song by Denzel Curry from King of the Mischievous South Vol. 2
- "Wishlist", a 2017 song by Kiiara
- "Wish Liszt (Toy Shop Madness)", a 2004 instrumental by the Trans-Siberian Orchestra from The Lost Christmas Eve
