= Abbott Elementary season 5 =

Season of television series

Abbott Elementary
- Season 5
- Promotional poster
- Showrunners: Quinta Brunson; Patrick Schumacker; Justin Halpern
- Starring: Quinta Brunson; Tyler James Williams; Janelle James; Lisa Ann Walter; Chris Perfetti; William Stanford Davis; Sheryl Lee Ralph
- No. of episodes: 22

Release
- Original network: ABC
- Original release: October 1, 2025 – April 22, 2026

Season chronology
- ← Previous; Season 4 Next → Season 6

The fifth season of the American television comedy Abbott Elementary premiered on ABC on October 1, 2025. Like the previous seasons, the season stars Quinta Brunson, Tyler James Williams, Janelle James, Lisa Ann Walter, Chris Perfetti, William Stanford Davis and Sheryl Lee Ralph. The season concluded on April 22, 2026 and contained 22 episodes.

Abbott Elementary is presented in a mockumentary format similar to one of The Office and Modern Family, and follows a documentary crew recording the lives of teachers working in underfunded schools including the fictional Willard R. Abbott Elementary School, a predominantly Black Philadelphia public school.

== Cast and characters ==
=== Main ===
- Quinta Brunson as Janine Teagues, a second-grade teacher at Abbott and hopes to improve the lives of her students by making the best of the poor situation the school district makes teachers work in. She currently dates Gregory.
- Tyler James Williams as Gregory Eddie, a first-grade teacher who was initially hired as a substitute replacement, and who is dating Janine.
- Janelle James as Ava Coleman, the school's tone-deaf principal who consistently bullies Janine and gives the staff reasons to believe she is poor at her job; a job which she received after blackmailing the superintendent.
- Lisa Ann Walter as Melissa Schemmenti, a sixth-grade teacher at Abbott who has questionable connections with the Philly locals, but uses them to help the school.
- Chris Perfetti as Jacob Hill, an eighth-grade history teacher who tries his best to help Janine with her plans to improve Abbott.
- William Stanford Davis as Mr. Johnson, the school's janitor who is seen as lazy, but consistent with his job.
- Sheryl Lee Ralph as Barbara Howard, a religious kindergarten teacher, adamant about keeping with tradition, and a mother-figure whom Janine looks up to.

=== Recurring ===
- Jerry Minor as Joseph Morton, a colleague of Jacob with whom he shares a complicated relationship.
- Luke Tennie as Dominic Clark, a new fourth-grade teacher at Abbott who is a former student of Barbara, now working alongside her.
- Taylor Garron as Tasha Hoffman, a fellow teacher who dislikes Janine.
- Zack Fox as Tariq Temple, Janine's ex-boyfriend who is now the president of the PTA.
- Lela Hoffmeister as Courtney Pierce, a student at Abbott who is favorited by Ava.
- Marcella Arguello as Elena Alomar, a new school counselor responsible for many schools.
- Matthew Law as O'Shon, an IT worker who is dating Ava.
- Benjamin Norris as Simon, a school district employee who is dating Erika.
- Pam Trotter as Dia, an admissions office worker at Abbott.

=== Guest ===
- George Sharperson as Wendell, a custodian at Abbott.
- Mikey Day as Craig, a district worker sent to help Abbott with team building exercises.
- Kyle Schwarber as himself, a baseball player for the Philadelphia Phillies.
- Phillie Phanatic as himself, the mascot for the Phillies who O'Shon suspects is Mr. Johnson.
- Courtney Taylor as Erika, a friend of Janine who attempts to improve her social circle.
- Jaboukie Young-White as Elijah, Jacob's love interest.
- Ed Begley Jr. as Mr. Ronson, a janitor at the DMV who trained under Mr. Johnson.
- Maria Russell as Tammy, a frustrated employee of the DMV.
- Mason Renfro as Alex Perkins, a student at Abbott who is part of Gregory's garden club.
- Blake Anderson as a park ranger.
- Kimia Behpoornia as Emily, a school district representative who previously worked with Janine.
- Taraji P. Henson as Vanetta Teagues, Janine's mother.
- Steve Agee as Edward, a school district repairman.
- Raven Goodwin as Krystal, the parent of a student who is on the PTA.
- Khandi Alexander as Miss Carroll, a custodian sent to help Mr. Johnson, who he develops a romance with.
- Cree Summer as Rosalyn Inez, a librarian hired for Janine's library program who now works at the school.
- Tyler Perez as Caleb Hill, Jacob's little brother who is hired as a part-time gym teacher at Abbott.
- Keyla Monterroso Mejia as Ashley Garcia, a teachers aide who previously worked with Melissa
- Mike O'Malley as Captain Robinson, the captain of the Philadelphia fire department who dates Melissa.
- Casey Frey as Slim, a district worker sent to help Abbott with safety training.
- James III as Harold, a district worker sent to help Abbott with safety training.
- Kate Peterman as Tina Schwartz, a teacher formerly employed by Abbott who is now running for a school district liaison position.
- Tatyana Ali as Crystal, a former sorority sister of Ava who is now the principal of another school.
- Langston Kerman as Darnell, the parent of a student who was previously in Gregory's class.
- Shane Paul McGhie as Jonathan Pierce, a former student of Melissa who is now involved in financial scams.
- DeVonta Smith as himself, wide receiver for the Philadelphia Eagles.
- Kate Flannery as Joy Crawford, a Philadelphia-area teacher at the Miami teachers' conference.
- Lauren Weedman as Kristen Marie Schemmenti, Melissa's sister.
- Jim Rash as Thomas, a school district representative.

== Episodes ==
No. overall	No. in season	Title	Directed by	Written by	Original release date	Prod. code	U.S. viewers (millions)
72	1	"Team Building"	Randall Einhorn	Quinta Brunson	October 1, 2025	T12.19501	2.83
During Development Day, the district implements mandatory team building exercises for the staff at Abbott. A gas leak forces everyone outside. A new teacher, Dominic, was once one of Barbara's students and she is delighted. Janine struggles with her place now that she isn't a new teacher. Jacob and Mr. Morton prepare Melissa for teaching sixth graders. Gregory teaches Mr. Johnson how to ride a bike. After fixing the gas leak, the repairman tells Ava the school building has several other problems.
73	2	"Cheating"	Randall Einhorn	Brian Rubenstein	October 8, 2025	T12.19502	2.34
Melissa is confident in teaching the sixth graders. However, her confidence is tested when Gregory informs her that the students are cheating. Tariq's girlfriend's son is now in Janine's class. Meanwhile, a new counselor arrives to the school and Barbara and Jacob take unnecessary advantage of her presence.
74	3	"Ballgame"	Randall Einhorn	Ava Coleman	October 15, 2025	T12.19504	2.83
The Abbott staff and O'Shon attend a Philadelphia Phillies game after Ava gets tickets for Teacher Appreciation Week. Janine gets excited at her first baseball game. Melissa challenges Jacob to the beer and hot dog 9-9-9 challenge. Barbara is excited to meet Kyle Schwarber. As Ava focuses on the kiss-cam, O'Shon wonders something about Mr. Johnson.
75	4	"Game Night"	Randall Einhorn	Brittani Nichols	October 22, 2025	T12.19503	2.86
Gregory volunteers to host game night with Janine, Jacob and their friends. However, his bland apartment creates an uncomfortable evening. Elsewhere, Mr. Johnson needs to visit the DMV in order to go on vacation and Ava, Barbara, and Melissa go with him for their own individual needs.
76	5	"Camping"	Matthew Pexa	Kate Peterman	October 29, 2025	T12.19505	2.41
Barbara organizes a Halloween-themed camping trip for the staff and students. The teachers are less than thrilled to be attending, and Janine proposes the idea to start her own club at the school.
77	6	"No Phones"	Randall Einhorn	Joya McCrory	November 5, 2025	T12.19506	2.36
The teachers attempt to find ways around the phone-less school day when the faculty and students participate in "No Phones Day" encouraged by the district. Barbara's daughter goes into labor.
78	7	"Goofgirl"	Justin Tan	Justin Tan	December 3, 2025	T12.19507	2.29
Gregory struggles to get the boys to engage when a girl joins the Garden Goofballs. Janine seeks Ava's approval to start a Fashion Club. Ms. Alomar attempts to teach Barbara and Melissa new ways of communicating with their men.
79	8	"Birthday"	Matt Sohn	Garrett Werner	December 10, 2025	T12.19508	2.52
Janine plans to celebrate her 30th birthday with Gregory and her visiting mom, Vanetta. Jacob and a reluctant Gregory put on "The Color Purple" winter show. Mr. Johnson, Melissa and Ava deal with the school's furnace breaking.
80	9	"Mall"	Randall Einhorn	Riley Dufurrena	January 7, 2026	T12.19509	2.74
The district puts the staff and students in an abandoned mall until repairs are done on the school. The teachers spend winter break trying to get it ready. Janine tries to make it just like Abbott. The first day is chaos, but Barbara is able to rally the staff together. Gregory helps Dominic adjust.
81	10	"Mall Part 2: Questions & Concerns"	Tyler James Williams	Chad Morton	January 14, 2026	T12.19510	2.81
As the parents' questions mount of the mall school and when Abbott will re-open, Janine and Gregory can offer no answers. Ava faces the parents directly to protect the teachers. Meanwhile, Barbara and Jacob spy on Melissa when it looks like Mr. Morton is trying to steal her from their friend group.
82	11	"Mall Part 3: Heroes"	Jennifer Celotta	Rebekka Pesqueira	January 21, 2026	T12.19511	2.83
The school district sends Simon and a local reporter to cover how the students are thriving, despite the challenges of the mall. The teachers are initially flattered, but Ms. Alomar points out they could be using this as a distraction on how slow Abbott's repairs are going. Going to the building, they find one lone construction worker, who explains the crews were sent to other schools. Confronting Simon, the teachers are able to get back to Abbott a few weeks later. Mr. Johnson falls for Miss Carroll, a second custodian temporarily sent to help clean the mall.
83	12	"Picture Day"	Randall Einhorn	Lizzy Darrell	January 28, 2026	T12.19512	2.70
Ava forgets to tell the teachers about the rescheduled Picture Day after a massive rainstorm. Unhappy with their pictures, the teachers being secretly editing and replacing the photos, arguing with each other for doing so. After seeing the effect this has on the younger students, the teachers display their own childhood photos instead. Ava negotiates with the kitchen staff feeling overlooked, and gives them their own photoshoot.
84	13	"Candygrams"	Randall Einhorn	Chad Morton & Rebekka Pesqueira	February 4, 2026	T12.19514	2.83
Gregory's rent is raised so Janine suggests he move in with her. Gregory is excited, until he realizes several reminders of Tariq are still in her apartment. Gregory eventually admits this. With the two of them splitting rent, they are able to move together into the apartment above Janine's old one. O'Shon doesn't like Ava accepting Valentine's gifts from old and potential suitors, she gives them all to Mr. Johnson as a sign she is committed to O'Shon. Melissa and Barbara anonymously send a candygram so a student in Melissa's class isn't left out, despite Jacob's warning to stay out of it. The student actually has a girlfriend from another school.
85	14	"Aide"	Richie Edelson	Megan Carroll	March 4, 2026	T12.19513	2.52
After more students are added to her class, Janine convinces Ava to get her an aide, only for it to be Ashley, with whom she butts heads. A miscommunication leads Jacob to think Dominic is gay. Jacob's brother Caleb is hired to be the school's gym teacher.
86	15	"Safety Day"	Dime Davis	Garrett Werner	March 11, 2026	T12.19515	2.32
The school district combines Fire Safety, FADE and the Story Samurai all into one event. Gregory and later Janine struggle with not being allowed to speak as part of a texting and driving lesson. Melissa doesn't react well to the news Captain Robinson is being promoted. Barbara tries to understand strange dreams. Jacob decides to run for a school liaison position against Tina, the former Abbott teacher fired years ago.
87	16	"Campaign"	Brittani Nichols	Riley Dufurrena	March 18, 2026	T12.19516	2.40
Jacob is losing the campaign to Tina so he asks Ava to be his manager. At the debate, he is surprised when the student Tina kicked years ago forgives her, but is able to say his annoying personality will fight for the schools' needs and wins by one vote. Tina decides to run for a school board role. Gregory accidentally insults Barbara's role as a teacher, so they switch classes. Janine and Melissa help Mr. Johnson get ready for the Janitor's Ball to impress Miss Carroll.
88	17	"No Homework"	Jeff Gonzalez	Justin Tan	March 25, 2026	T12.19517	2.49
Ava learns Crystal has implemented a No Homework policy at her school. Ava immediately does the same at Abbott. Barbara leads the teachers in secretly sending homework. Ava finds out and confronts Barbara. Barbara convinces her that her rivalry with Crystal mustn't harm the school. Ava later finds out Crystal doesn't even test her students due to them failing. Meanwhile, Janine struggles with Gregory not grading homework, and Melissa starts using a sportsbook app.
89	18	"April Fools"	Claire Scanlon	Joya McCroy	April 1, 2026	T12.19518	2.48
The teachers are on high alert during April Fools Day. At first, they think they're safe as the usual prankster Mr. Morton, is in the hospital. Various pranks spread around the school, getting all the teachers. Ava barricades herself in her office. When even the locked staff room and Ava's coffee aren't safe, Ava realizes Dia has been helping the kids. Dia reveals April Fools is her favorite day and also her birthday.
90	19	"Trip"	Razan Ghalayini	Ava Coleman	April 8, 2026	T12.19519	2.41
Janine and Gregory plan a trip to the Outer Banks, but their plans hit a rough patch when they disagree on transportation and finances, thus decide to break up. Barbara realizes her kindergarteners are lying to her about eating their snacks, and Melissa receives a visit by a student from her very first year of teaching. Realizing he was convicted of scamming seniors, she refuses to write a letter to the judge for him.
91	20	"Night Out"	Randall Einhorn	Kate Peterman	April 15, 2026	T12.19520	2.37
In an attempt to cheer them up after the breakup, Ava and Erika take Janine out to the bar, while Jacob and Caleb take Gregory to the club. Both separately admit they are depressed and regret the breakup but refuse to talk to the other. Meanwhile, Melissa and Mr. Johnson attempt to watch Avatar: Fire and Ash but are constantly interrupted by Barbara's questions. The next morning, Jacob and Ava begin working on getting Janine and Gregory back together.
92	21	"Ava & Fest"	Patrick Schumacker	Brittani Nichols	April 22, 2026	T12.19521	2.73
Jacob and Ava's attempts to get Janine and Gregory to talk to each other only backfire. Barbara and Mr. Johnson finally agree to step in, each making Janine and Gregory realize they are acting like their parents. They finally talk about what they really want, and realize with the school district's conference in Miami, they can get a cheaper flight to The Bahamas after. Jacob and Melissa try talking to Courtney after they hear some students plan on stealing, though Courtney teaches them a lesson. Dominic makes mistakes on his tasks for Ava Fest but wins approval by bringing in DeVonta Smith, for a charity game.
93	22	"Miami"	Randall Einhorn	Brian Rubenstein	April 22, 2026	T12.19522	2.41
In Miami for the conference, all the various teachers are alarmed that the district plans on shutting down 20 schools, including Abbott. The teachers panic about what their next career moves could be, but rally everyone that night to have one last party. Gregory tells O'Shon he was getting ready in his life plan to propose to Janine. The next morning Jacob tries to talk to the new superintendent, but is rebuffed. The district spares Abbott as Jacob pointed out they have a new furnace which means financially Abbott should stay open. To prepare for the influx of students coming, Ava will need an Assistant Principal and chooses Gregory, actualizing his dream. O'Shon offers to help get him a discount on a ring. Meanwhile, at school, Mr. Johnson accidentally washes away the parking spot lines.

== Production ==
Abbott Elementary was renewed for a fifth season on January 21, 2025, while still airing the fourth season. Alongside the announcement, the main cast, including executive producer and creator Quinta Brunson, was confirmed to return.

Filming for the fifth season began on August 6, 2025. An episode of the season was filmed at a live Philadelphia Phillies baseball game, with the entire cast and crew in attendance. In an addition to a special episode with the Phillies, the season will also feature the return of holiday episodes, specifically those for Halloween and Christmas. A major plot line throughout the season is set to follow Barbara Howard, a character who is portrayed by Sheryl Lee Ralph.

Like the previous seasons, the fifth season of Abbott Elementary features many supporting actors including Jerry Minor, Matthew Law, Zack Fox and Jaboukie Young-White, who all return from appearing in previous seasons. In September 2025, Luke Tennie was announced to recur during the season as Dominic, a new teacher who was in the classroom of Barbara Howard as a young student. In January 2026, Khandi Alexander joined the cast in a recurring role. Filming on the season wrapped on late February 2026.

== Reception ==
=== Ratings ===
The season premiered on October 1, 2025, shelved between Shifting Gears and The Golden Bachelor. The series moved to its new time slot of Wednesday nights at 8:30 p.m. ET/PT.

Viewership and ratings per episode of Abbott Elementary season 5
No.	Title	Air date	Timeslot (ET)	Rating/share (18–49)	Viewers (millions)	DVR (18–49)	DVR viewers (millions)	Total (18–49)	Total viewers (millions)	Ref.
1	"Team Building"	October 1, 2025	Wednesday 8:30 p.m.	0.29/4	2.83	0.25	1.20	0.54	4.03	
2	"Cheating"	October 8, 2025	Wednesday 8:30 p.m.	0.27/4	2.34	0.23	1.09	0.49	3.41	
3	"Ballgame"	October 15, 2025	Wednesday 8:30 p.m.	0.38/6	2.83	0.29	1.26	0.67	4.09	
4	"Game Night"	October 22, 2025	Wednesday 8:30 p.m.	0.35/5	2.86	0.26	0.97	0.61	3.83	
5	"Camping"	October 29, 2025	Wednesday 8:30 p.m.	0.30/4	2.41	0.20	0.79	0.49	3.20	
6	"No Phones"	November 5, 2025	Wednesday 8:30 p.m.	0.33/5	2.36	0.16	0.72	0.48	3.08	
