= New Tech (Abbott Elementary) =

- Abbott Elementary episode
- Episode no.: Season 1 Episode 4
- Directed by: Randall Einhorn
- Written by: Brian Rubenstein
- Production code: T12.17152
- Original air date: January 18, 2022

Guest appearances
- William Stanford Davis as Mr. Johnson; Levi Mynatt as Will; Brian Scolaro as Vinny

Episode chronology
← Previous "Wishlist"	Next → "Student Transfer"
- Abbott Elementary (season 1)

"New Tech" is the fourth episode of the American sitcom television series Abbott Elementary. It was written by Brian Rubenstein, and was directed by Randall Einhorn. It premiered on the American Broadcasting Company (ABC) in the United States on January 18, 2022. In the episode, Barbara struggles with a new learning program for her students; which prompts her to lie when she accidentally cheats the program.

Sheryl Lee Ralph won the Primetime Emmy Award for Outstanding Supporting Actress in a Comedy Series for her performance in this episode.

== Plot ==
The district implements a new computer program to help the students with reading. Barbara (Sheryl Lee Ralph) has the most difficulty in using it and Janine (Quinta Brunson) excites herself that she may be able to help Barbara with something; as opposed to it usually being the other way around. Barbara accidentally enters information that leads principal Ava (Janelle James) to think that her kindergartners are now able to read at an advanced level. Ava arranges a school assembly to have Barbara's lowest-performing student read Becoming out loud, while Barbara has too much pride to admit it was a mistake.

Meanwhile, Jacob (Chris Perfetti) teaches about the Philadelphia strikes to his class and Melissa (Lisa Ann Walter) urges him to host her ex-convict friend as a guest speaker.

== Reception ==
Upon its initial broadcast on ABC, "New Tech" was viewed by 3.02 million viewers, earning a 0.58 in the 18-49 rating demographics on the Nielson ratings scale.

The episode airs following its midseason entry in the 2021–22 television season. Filming for the episode took place between August 16, and November 5, 2021, in Los Angeles, California. Like other episodes, interior scenes are filmed at Warner Bros. Studios, Burbank in Burbank, California, with exterior shots of the series being filmed in front of Vermont Elementary School in Los Angeles.

When reviewing the episode, Janelle Ureta of Tell Tale TV discussed the minor developments of the relationship of Janine and Gregory, stating; "'New Tech,' gives us the first clues that Janine reciprocates some of Gregory's growing feelings. Janine is awkward. Her very strange invitation for Gregory to join her and her boyfriend bed shopping is a sure sign that she is trying to impress him. Hopefully, we aren't in for a Jim and Pam romance, where we have to wait seasons for Janine to end things with her boyfriend. But, even if we do, I will enjoy the slow burn because these two are the real deal."
