= Abbott Elementary season 1 =

Season of television series

Abbott Elementary
- Season 1
- DVD cover
- Showrunners: Patrick Schumacker; Justin Halpern
- Starring: Quinta Brunson; Tyler James Williams; Janelle James; Lisa Ann Walter; Chris Perfetti; Sheryl Lee Ralph
- No. of episodes: 13

Release
- Original network: ABC
- Original release: December 7, 2021 – April 12, 2022

Season chronology
- Next → Season 2

The first season of the American television comedy Abbott Elementary created by Quinta Brunson, premiered in the United States on ABC on December 7, 2021, concluded on April 12, 2022, and consisted of thirteen episodes. The series sees the introduction of characters portrayed by Brunson, Tyler James Williams, Janelle James, Lisa Ann Walter, Chris Perfetti, and Sheryl Lee Ralph.

Abbott Elementary is presented in a mockumentary format similar to one of The Office and Modern Family, and follows a documentary crew recording the lives of teachers working in underfunded schools including the fictional Willard R. Abbott Elementary School, a predominantly Black Philadelphia public school.

The season holds a 98% approval rating from critics and audiences alike on Rotten Tomatoes, gaining universal acclaim. The success of the season ultimately led to a second season renewal in March 2022.

== Cast and characters ==
=== Main ===
- Quinta Brunson as Janine Teagues, a second-grade teacher at Abbott who hopes to improve the lives of her students by making the best of the poor situation the school district makes teachers work in.
- Tyler James Williams as Gregory Eddie, a substitute for a recently fired first-grade teacher who quickly harbors a crush on Janine.
- Janelle James as Ava Coleman, the school's tone-deaf principal who consistently bullies Janine and gives the staff reasons to believe she is poor at her job; a job in which she received after blackmailing the superintendent.
- Lisa Ann Walter as Melissa Schemmenti, a second-grade teacher at Abbott who has questionable connections with the Philly locals, but uses them to help the school.
- Chris Perfetti as Jacob Hill, an eighth-grade history teacher who tries his best to help Janine with her plans to improve Abbott.
- Sheryl Lee Ralph as Barbara Howard, a religious kindergarten teacher, adamant about keeping with tradition, and a mother-figure whom Janine looks up to.

=== Recurring ===
- William Stanford Davis as Mr. Johnson, the school's janitor who is seen as lazy, but consistent with his job.
- Zack Fox as Tariq Temple, Janine's boyfriend since middle school who is an aspiring rapper.

=== Guest ===
- Kate Peterman as Tina Schwartz, a second-grade teacher who is fired for assaulting a student.
- Naté Jones as Amber, the mother of a student in Gregory's class.
- Lela Hoffmeister as Courtney, a troubled student in Melissa's class who is transferred to Janine.
- Bruno Amato as Gary, a vending machine stocker who begins dating Melissa.
- Richard Brooks as Gerald, Barbara's husband.
- Mitra Jouhari as Sahar, a college friend of Janine who briefly works at Abbott as a substitute art teacher.
- Orlando Jones as Martin Eddie, Gregory's father.
- Iyana Halley as Taylor Howard, Barbara's daughter.
- Reggie Hayes as Denzel Collins, the school's superintendent who is after Ava for blackmailing him about an affair he had with his now-wife.
- Larry Owens as Zach, Jacob's boyfriend.

Additionally, Jim Gardner appears as himself, Levi Mynatt appears as Will, Brian Scolaro appears as Vinny, George Sharperson appears as Wendell, Ambrit Millhouse appears as Alley Williams and Shirley Jordan appears as Delisha Sloss.

== Episodes ==
No. overall	No. in season	Title	Directed by	Written by	Original release date	Prod. code	U.S. viewers (millions)
1	1	"Pilot"	Randall Einhorn	Quinta Brunson	December 7, 2021	T11.10144	2.88
When a teacher is fired for kicking a student, Gregory is hired as her temporary replacement. After initial pushback, Ava sends a request for more money to purchase supplies, including rugs for the classrooms, but she wastes the money on a new sign. Janine files a complaint to the superintendent, but the email is redirected to Ava, who disrespects her in front of the entire staff. Barbara, Jacob, and Melissa come to her defense, and realizing they are on their own, Melissa asks a friend to steal several rugs for the teachers.
2	2	"Light Bulb"	Randall Einhorn	Quinta Brunson	January 4, 2022	T12.17153	3.45
Janine experiences trouble in her personal life and work. She tries to fix the overhead lights at the school, but instead ends up knocking out the power to much of the school. Barbara helps Gregory stand up to a mother who repeatedly brings her son late to his class.
3	3	"Wishlist"	Randall Einhorn	Morgan Murphy	January 11, 2022	T12.17154	2.97
With Ava's help, Janine makes a viral video to get supplies for her classroom. She then asks Ava to secretly make a viral video for Barbara, who also needs supplies but refuses any help. Ava makes an exaggerated video of Barbara's situation, which also goes viral but creates an uncomfortable situation for her. Jacob attempts to get an old donated printer to function, while Janine encourages Gregory to decorate his classroom.
4	4	"New Tech"	Randall Einhorn	Brian Rubenstein	January 18, 2022	T12.17152	3.02
The district implements a new computer program to help students with reading. Barbara has the most difficulty in using it and accidentally enters information that leads Ava to think that her kindergartners are now able to read at an advanced level. Ava arranges an assembly to have Barbara's lowest-performing student read Becoming out loud, while Barbara has too much pride to admit it was a mistake. Meanwhile, Jacob is teaching about the Philadelphia strikes to his class and Melissa urges him to host her ex-convict friend as a guest speaker.
5	5	"Student Transfer"	Randall Einhorn	Brittani Nichols	January 25, 2022	T12.17155	3.06
Janine gets upset when Melissa teases her over a review that claims she is inexperienced. A disruptive student named Courtney is transferred from Melissa's class to Janine's. Janine attempts to use her to prove her competence but eventually consults Melissa for help. The two come to the conclusion that Courtney is not challenged enough and needs to move up a grade. Meanwhile, Jacob has difficulty with some of his students who are "roasting" him, but he later gets the idea to incorporate it into his lessons.
6	6	"Gifted Program"	Matt Sohn	Jordan Temple	February 1, 2022	T12.17156	2.77
After seeing a smart boy transferring to Abbott, Janine is inspired to start a "gifted program" at their school, with Jacob teaching. However, many of the other students not in the gifted program start to feel left out. This causes Janine to try to replicate the gifted program's lessons in her own class, only to end up accidentally releasing snakes in the school. With advice from Gregory, Janine dismantles the gifted program in favor of creating a rotational enrichment program for all the students. Meanwhile, Barbara encourages Melissa into going out with the vending machine owner, who resupplies snacks in the teacher's breakroom.
7	7	"Art Teacher"	Jennifer Celotta	Kate Peterman	February 8, 2022	T12.17157	2.61
When the art teacher retires, Janine's college friend Sahar is hired as the school's new volunteer art teacher. Sahar and Melissa disagree over the latter's Peter Rabbit project, and though Janine agrees with Melissa, she finds it hard to turn down Sahar's ideas. When Sahar makes an impressive art piece using the books Melissa bought, Janine finally stands up to her. Disappointed in the lack of vegetables in the school lunches, Jacob convinces Barbara that they should start a school garden despite having little experience doing so. Experienced in landscaping, a frustrated Gregory secretly tends to their garden to make sure it can thrive.
8	8	"Work Family"	Jay Karas	Justin Tan	February 15, 2022	T12.17158	2.31
Upset that Jacob thinks of her as just a "work friend", Janine tries to build better relationships with her co-workers. Barbara and Melissa help Gregory with his teaching methods after his class is found to be underperforming. Janine enlists Tariq to perform at an anti-drug program at her school. Gregory receives a phone call from his dad, who advises Gregory that he should move on from his substitute teaching at Abbott.
9	9	"Step Class"	Shahrzad Davani	Joya McCrory	February 22, 2022	T12.17159	3.06
Ava takes over Janine's after-school step class, as the students prefer Ava's teaching style over Janine, and redoes their routine for their upcoming school performance. Ava does not show up on the day of the performance, but Janine discovers it was because she was taking care of her grandmother. After the situation is clarified, the show goes forward. Meanwhile, Gregory feels alienated by the other staff members when it is revealed he does not like pizza.
10	10	"Open House"	Jennifer Celotta	Brian Rubenstein	March 22, 2022	T12.17160	2.64
While waiting for a student's mother at the open house event, Janine becomes envious about Barbara's relationship with her daughter, Taylor; however, Barbara and Taylor get into an argument over Taylor's career. Jacob secretly reveals he knows how to play Poker during a game with Melissa and Mr. Johnson. Gregory goes into a slump after finding out Ava was the reason why he lost the principal job, and he bonds with Taylor. When Superintendent Collins visits the school, he reveals that he divorced his wife and married his mistress, meaning that Ava no longer has leverage against him.
11	11	"Desking"	Melissa Kosar	Morgan Murphy	March 29, 2022	T12.17161	2.54
"Desking", a new online trend where students run to the other side of the room by jumping on desks, becomes popular at Abbott Elementary. Jacob enlists the help of Zach, his boyfriend, to help identify the footprints, but none of the students will confess. Janine and Jacob, who previously assume that the students see them as "cool", are forced to remember that the students will never see them as equals. To put an end to desking, the teachers record a video of Jacob performing it so it will seem "uncool" to the students.
12	12	"Ava vs. Superintendent"	Matthew A. Cherry	Brittani Nichols	April 5, 2022	T12.17162	2.58
With Ava's job and the school's funding in jeopardy, Janine asks a reluctant Gregory to help her and Ava with an important upcoming presentation to the school board. Ava makes a strong presentation to the school board, but Superintendent Collins denies her request, as he is still angry with her for having blackmailed him the last few years. With Melissa's prodding, Barbara ends up getting the extra funding needed for Abbott by extorting a woman on the School Board who she goes to church with and who is skimming money from church funds. Later, Ava tells Gregory that he will be working full-time at Abbott for the next school year.
13	13	"Zoo Balloon"	Randall Einhorn	Jordan Temple	April 12, 2022	T12.17163	2.78
Abbott Elementary takes their annual, year-end school trip to the Philadelphia Zoo with Tariq, Taylor, and Zach serving as chaperones. Tariq gets an opportunity to move to New York to record an anti-drug themed album, but Janine is not sure she wants to leave Abbott to go to New York with him. Barbara ponders about her future when her favorite zoo animal is retired due to old age. Gregory tells Janine that next school year he will be full-time at Abbott. Janine ultimately decides to take a "break" from Tariq, and not move to New York with him.

== Production ==
=== Development ===
In May 2021, Abbott Elementary was given a series order. The season is distributed by Disney Platform Distribution and Warner Bros. Domestic Television Distribution, while being produced by Delicious Non-Sequitur, 20th Television and Warner Bros. Television. The first season released onto DVD and various online platforms including Amazon Prime, Apple TV & Vudu on October 18, 2022.

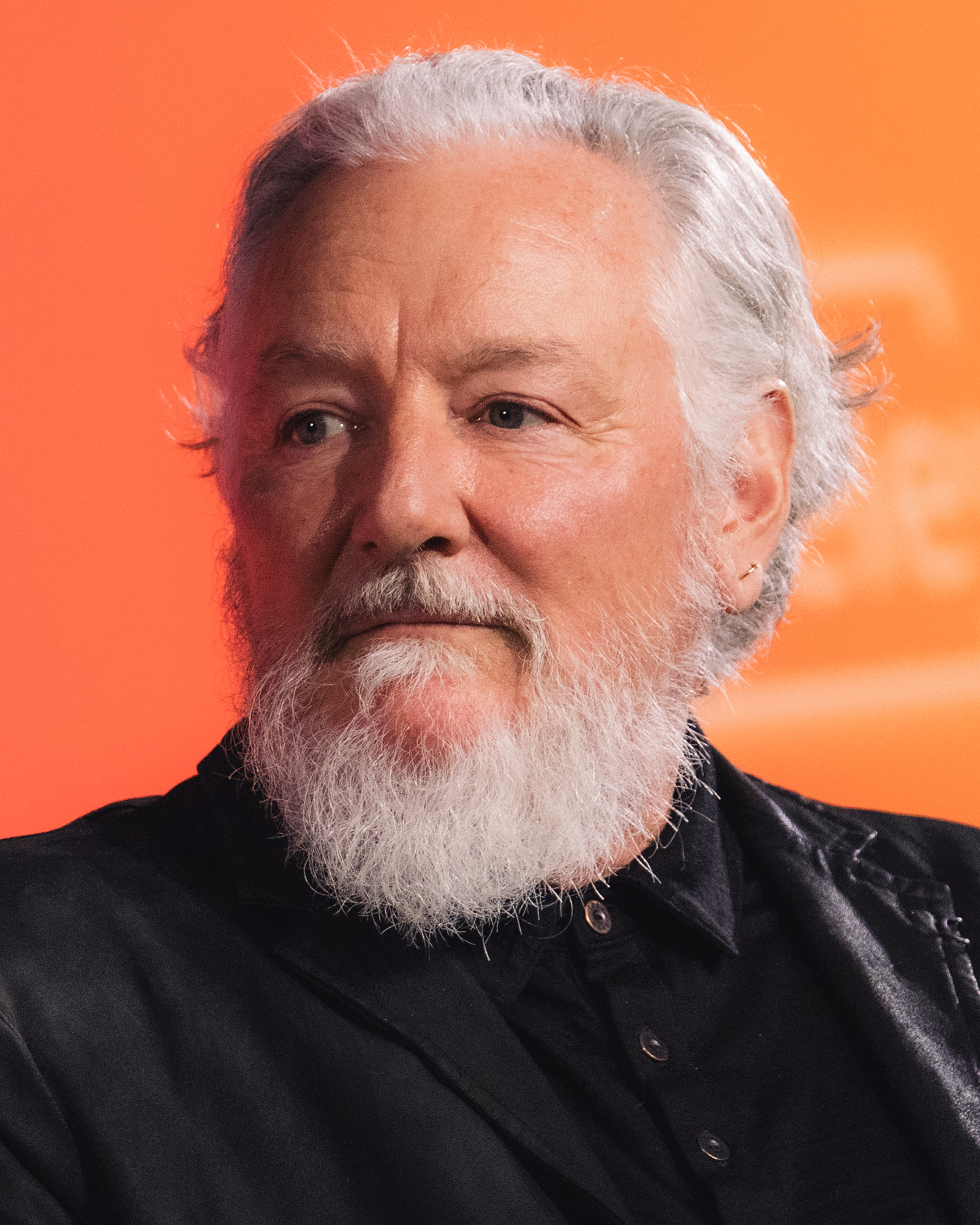
Randall Einhorn (pictured) directs the first five episodes of the season and also serves as an executive producer.

In an interview, director and producer Randall Einhorn spoke about how the series works with the mockumentary format:

"The thing that I was really clear upfront about when we started shooting the show is the rules. Other shows don't necessarily have rules, they have styles that they're serving. But to keep the documentary honest, we needed to have rules, and that can make a lot of things harder."

On March 14, 2022, due to the success of the series, a second season was green-lit by ABC months before the first season was set to conclude. Brunson, Einhorn, Justin Halpern and Patrick Schumacker all returned as executive producers.

=== Casting ===
In March 2021, Tyler James Williams, Janelle James, Lisa Ann Walter, Chris Perfetti, and Sheryl Lee Ralph were announced to star as regular cast members; alongside Brunson, who was confirmed to star upon the series announcement.

In addition to the main cast, the series sees William Stanford David and Zack Fox recur as Mr. Johnson and Tariq Temple respectively. Tariq is Janine's slightly selfish and so-called "feminist" boyfriend, whom she dates throughout the duration of the season. After backlash from the staff of Abbott, Janine ultimately breaks up with him during the season finale. When asked about the relationship of Tariq and Janine, and why she wrote him the way she did, Brunson stated:

We have these Black main characters, and I saw an opportunity to make sure that they were fleshed out and dimensional. We don’t very often get to see that. Yes, there have been other Black shows, but not as many. So, I don’t think that Tariq is a villain. I think people are just growing up. Tariq is doing the best he can, and we wanted to show that too.

The second episode of the season, "Light Bulb", features a short cameo from Philadelphia ABC Channel 6 Action News anchor Jim Gardner, who appears during the cold open; beloved by the staff of Abbott. Another Philadelphia celebrity, Gritty of the Philadelphia Flyers, was originally supposed to appear during the pilot episode, but was unable due to scheduling conflicts.

=== Filming ===
Filming began on August 16, 2021, in Los Angeles, California, and concluded on November 5, 2021. The interior scenes of the series are filmed at Warner Bros. Studios in Burbank, California, with exterior shots of the series being filmed in front of Vermont Elementary School in Los Angeles. In August, three crew members tested positive for COVID-19 but production was not impacted.

== Reception ==
=== Critical response ===
For the first season, Metacritic, which uses a weighted average, assigned a score of 80 out of 100 based on 16 critics, indicating "generally favorable" reviews. Angie Han of The Hollywood Reporter said the first episodes "[are] a willingness to deal with class head on, while also finding humor in the characters' situations", and concluded that Abbott Elementary is "crowd-pleasing."

=== Ratings ===
The series premiered on December 7, 2021. New episodes aired at 9:30 p.m. (EST) weekly prior to the premiere of new episodes of Black-ish; which was in its final season. Including viewership recorded over a 35-day period through "linear and digital platforms" (known as MP35) after its original broadcast, the pilot episode on December 7, 2021, increased to a 2.4 demographic rating, with 7.1 million viewers. ABC said the 300% increase was its "largest percentage growth for any new comedy premiere". The viewership of the second episode, "Light Bulb", increased by 5.6 million viewers to 9 million after 35 days. Per The Hollywood Reporter, the first season of Abbott Elementary ranked 66 in broadcast television ratings for the 2021-22 season, and scored a 3.84 average million viewers.

Viewership and ratings per episode of Abbott Elementary season 1
No.	Title	Air date	Rating (18–49)	Viewers (millions)	DVR (18–49)	DVR viewers (millions)	Total (18–49)	Total viewers (millions)
1	"Pilot"	December 7, 2021	0.6	2.88	0.2	0.79	0.8	3.67
2	"Light Bulb"	January 4, 2022	0.6	3.45	0.2	0.82	0.9	4.27 (Note: Live+7 ratings were unavailable, so Live+3 ratings have been used instead.)
3	"Wishlist"	January 11, 2022	0.6	2.97	—N/a	—N/a	—N/a	—N/a
4	"New Tech"	January 18, 2022	0.6	3.02	0.2	0.72	0.8	3.75
5	"Student Transfer"	January 25, 2022	0.6	3.06	0.2	0.72	0.8	3.78
6	"Gifted Program"	February 1, 2022	0.6	2.77	—N/a	—N/a	—N/a	—N/a
7	"Art Teacher"	February 8, 2022	0.6	2.61	—N/a	—N/a	—N/a	—N/a
8	"Work Family"	February 15, 2022	0.4	2.31	—N/a	—N/a	—N/a	—N/a
9	"Step Class"	February 22, 2022	0.6	3.06	0.2	0.79	0.9	3.84
10	"Open House"	March 22, 2022	0.5	2.64	0.3	1.12	0.8	3.76
11	"Desking"	March 29, 2022	0.5	2.54	0.2	0.97	0.7	3.48
12	"Ava vs. Superintendent"	April 5, 2022	0.5	2.58	0.3	1.11	0.8	3.68
13	"Zoo Balloon"	April 12, 2022	0.6	2.78	0.3	1.03	0.8	3.81
