= Abbott Elementary season 6 =

Season of television series

Abbott Elementary
- Season 6
- Promotional poster
- Showrunners: Quinta Brunson; Patrick Schumacker; Justin Halpern
- Starring: Quinta Brunson; Tyler James Williams; Janelle James; Lisa Ann Walter; Chris Perfetti; William Stanford Davis; Sheryl Lee Ralph
- No. of episodes: 6

Release
- Original network: ABC
- Original release: October 7, 2026 – present

Season chronology
- ← Previous; Season 5

The sixth season of the American television comedy Abbott Elementary premiered on ABC on October 7, 2026. Like the previous seasons, the season stars Quinta Brunson, Tyler James Williams, Janelle James, Lisa Ann Walter, Chris Perfetti, William Stanford Davis and Sheryl Lee Ralph.

Abbott Elementary is presented in a mockumentary format similar to one of The Office and Modern Family, and follows a documentary crew recording the lives of teachers working in underfunded schools including the fictional Willard R. Abbott Elementary School, a predominantly Black Philadelphia public school.

The sixth season of Abbott Elementary reaches a milestone one-hundredth episode with the seventh episode of the season, "One Hundred".

== Cast and characters ==
=== Main ===
- Quinta Brunson as Janine Teagues, a second-grade teacher at Abbott and hopes to improve the lives of her students by making the best of the poor situation the school district makes teachers work in. She currently dates Gregory.
- Tyler James Williams as Gregory Eddie, a first-grade teacher who was initially hired as a substitute replacement, and who is dating Janine.
- Janelle James as Ava Coleman, the school's tone-deaf principal who consistently bullies Janine and gives the staff reasons to believe she is poor at her job; a job which she received after blackmailing the superintendent.
- Lisa Ann Walter as Melissa Schemmenti, a sixth-grade teacher at Abbott who has questionable connections with the Philly locals, but uses them to help the school.
- Chris Perfetti as Jacob Hill, an eighth-grade history teacher who tries his best to help Janine with her plans to improve Abbott.
- William Stanford Davis as Mr. Johnson, the school's janitor who is seen as lazy, but consistent with his job.
- Sheryl Lee Ralph as Barbara Howard, a religious kindergarten teacher, adamant about keeping with tradition, and a mother-figure whom Janine looks up to.

=== Recurring ===
- Jerry Minor as Joseph Morton

=== Guest ===
- Katy Mixon Greer as Elsa Hardaway
- Geoffrey Owens as Derek Collins
- Tahir Moore as Abdul
- Ben Onyx Dowdy as Warren
- Tyrese Maxey as himself
- VJ Edgecombe as himself
- Jaylen Brown as himself
- Lela Hoffmeister as Courtney Pierce
- Taylor Garron as Tasha Hoffman
- Pam Trotter as Dia
- Tyler Perez as Caleb Hill
- Zack Fox as Tariq Temple
- Miranda Cosgrove as Natalie
- Ali Wong as Ms. Pittman
- Mike O'Malley as Captain Robinson
- Richard Brooks as Gerald
- Jaboukie Young-White as Elijah
- Matthew Law as O'Shon
- Edi Patterson as Abby
- Luke Tennie as Dominic Clark
- Marcella Arguello as Elena Alomar
- Bill Hader as TBA

== Episodes ==
No. overall	No. in season	Title	Directed by	Written by	Original release date	Prod. code	U.S. viewers (millions)
94	1	"Jungle Classroom"	Randall Einhorn	Quinta Brunson	October 7, 2026	T12.20601	2.22
After encouragement from online trends, Janine works to give her classroom a jungle theme for the new school year. Jacob and Barbara hire a school crossing-guard after Barbara is in a minor accident and Melissa works to get her first-floor classroom back from new second-grade teacher Elsa Hardaway. Meanwhile, Gregory has been promoted to assistant principal, and he works alongside Ava to track down the Superintendent for new air conditioners.
95	2	"Check-Ins"	Randall Einhorn	Ava Coleman	October 14, 2026	T12.20602	2.24
Gregory struggles to teach and do his check-ins with the staff amid an argument between Melissa and Jacob. Barbara asks Mr. Johnson how to best help a student with alopecia. Ava and Janine try to help Courtney, now an eighth grader, amid her parents' divorce.
96	3	"Tryouts"	Justin Tan	Justin Tan	October 21, 2026	T12.20603	2.69
Ava and Mr. Johnson prepare the Step Team as they try out for regionals. Melissa and Barbara take a certification course but don't take it seriously. Janine, Gregory and Jacob are uncomfortable with the new substitute teacher, Natalie.
97	4	"Halloween Party"	Randall Einhorn	Joya McCroy	October 28, 2026	T12.20604	2.31
The teachers crash Ava's Halloween warehouse party. Janine and Jacob become suspicious of Gregory's whereabouts. Barbara and Melissa try and make their men be friends.
98	5	"Courtney"	Jeff Gonzalez	Kate Peterman	November 4, 2026	T12.20605	2.42
Janine struggles to support Courtney through her personal problems. Barbara and Jacob challenge the school district's policy of passing failing students. Ava tries to come up with funds for new uniforms for the step team. Gregory and Melissa worry about firing Dominic.
99	6	"Competition"	Matt Sohn	Garrett Werner	November 11, 2026	T12.20606	TBD
Everyone heads to the Step Team's competition. After the lead dancer is hurt, Janine and Ava motivate the rest of the team. Gregory and Melissa try to cancel Gregory's reservation at an Italian restaurant. Barbara works as a volunteer with Tariq. Abbott Elementary wins the competition and a trip to Disneyland.
100	7	"One Hundred"	Randall Einhorn	Riley Dufurrena	December 2, 2026	T12.20607	TBD
101	8	"Parents"	TBA	Jaboukie Young-White	December 9, 2026	T12.20608	TBD
102	9	"Viral"	TBA	Rebekka Pesqueira	January 13, 2027	T12.20609	TBD

== Production ==
On March 4, 2026, it was announced that Abbott Elementary was renewed for a sixth season. The season premiered on October 7, 2026.

The main cast members from previous seasons are set to return. In October 2026, it was announced that Miranda Cosgrove, Edi Patterson and Ali Wong were set to appear as guest stars in the season.

In promotion for the season, advertisements featuring original music was created with the characters of the series depicted in the animation style of Schoolhouse Rock!.
