= Pilot (Abbott Elementary) =

- Abbott Elementary episode
- Episode no.: Season 1 Episode 1
- Directed by: Randall Einhorn
- Written by: Quinta Brunson
- Production code: T11.10144
- Original air date: December 7, 2021

Guest appearances
- Kate Peterman as Tina Schwartz; William Stanford Davis as Mr. Johnson

Episode chronology
← Previous —	Next → "Light Bulb"

"Pilot" is the first episode of the first season of the American comedy television series Abbott Elementary. The episode premiered in the United States on ABC on December 7, 2021. The episode was written by series creator and lead actress Quinta Brunson, and was directed by Randall Einhorn.

The episode sees the introduction of protagonist Janine Teagues, played by Brunson, as well as the other regular characters portrayed by Tyler James Williams, Chris Perfetti, Lisa Ann Walter, Sheryl Lee Ralph, and Janelle James. Teagues is a second-grade teacher at the poorly-funded Willard R. Abbott Elementary, a fictional predominantly Black school in Philadelphia. In "Pilot", Janine undertakes getting new rugs for the school after a student urinates on the rug in her classroom. Unqualified and cavalier principal Ava Coleman (James) wastes Janine's requested budget from the school district, forcing the teachers to improvise.

The pilot has achieved numerous awards and nominations for its writing, directing and acting by the ensemble cast.

== Plot ==
The episode introduces Janine Teagues, a second-grade teacher with one year of experience at Abbott Elementary, a predominantly Black K–8 school in West Philadelphia. She explains to a documentary crew that, while she is proud to teach, the school struggles with city funding despite the nearby multi-million-dollar renovation of the Philadelphia Eagles stadium. Janine's student Jamal urinates on the classroom rug, forcing her to throw it away without a replacement. Without the rug, Janine's class becomes unruly; senior Kindergarten teacher Barbara Howard orders them to sit with ease.

In the teachers' lounge, Janine expresses her need for a new rug to fellow teachers Jacob Hill and Melissa Schemmenti who echo that they, too, need rugs. After overwhelmed first grade teacher Tina Schwartz is fired for kicking a student, Janine cites the incident to negligent principal Ava Coleman as a result of the teachers not receiving enough funding. Ava reluctantly submits an emergency budget request to the school district to prevent the situation from escalating. Later that day, Gregory Eddie arrives to substitute for Ms. Schwartz.

The following day, Ava reveals to the staff that she had used the entire provided budget for a new school sign instead of funding the much-needed aides and the requested rugs. Indignant, Janine e-mails the superintendent about what Ava has done. However, Barbara and Melissa inform her that e-mails from teachers to the superintendent are bounced back to that teacher's principal. Ava, having received Janine's attempt to go over her head, fabricates a mandatory teacher "trust workshop" in the library as an excuse to openly mock Janine in front of her peers. Janine admits to everyone that she disrespected Ava and apologizes. Before she walks out, she explains that she circumvented Ava out of care for the students. The other teachers, in agreement, follow her out.

Janine shows the other teachers that one of her students naps on the classroom floor since the class rug was more comfortable than his bed at home. Off of Janine's idea, Melissa uses her contacts working the stadium renovation to steal new, Eagles-branded rugs for the school. Janine is satisfied that she is still able to help her students and the school without help from higher-ups, but clarifies "money would be nice, though."

== Reception ==
=== Viewership ===
The episode was viewed by 2.88 million people during its first broadcast on ABC. Including viewership recorded over a 35-day period through "linear and digital platforms" (known as MP35) after its original broadcast, the pilot episode on December 7, 2021, increased to a 2.4 demographic rating, with 7.1 million viewers. ABC said the 300% increase was its "largest percentage growth for any new comedy premiere".

=== Awards and nominations ===
The episode has racked up numerous awards, including Brunson winning the Outstanding Writing, Comedy Series award for writing the pilot at the Black Reel Television Awards. At the Hollywood Critics Association Awards, Brunson won the Best Writing in a Broadcast Network or Cable Series, Comedy award, while Randall Einhorn was nominated for Best Directing in a Broadcast Network or Cable Series, Comedy for his directorial duties in the pilot. At the 74th Primetime Emmy Awards, Brunson won the Outstanding Writing for a Comedy Series for writing the episode.
