= Step Class (Abbott Elementary) =

- Abbott Elementary episode
- Episode no.: Season 1 Episode 9
- Directed by: Shahrzad Davani
- Written by: Joya McCroy
- Production code: T12.17159
- Original air date: February 22, 2022

Guest appearance
- William Stanford Davis as Mr. Johnson

Episode chronology
← Previous "Work Family"	Next → "Open House"
- Abbott Elementary (season 1)

"Step Class" is the ninth episode of the American sitcom television series Abbott Elementary. It was written by Joya McCroy, and was directed by Shahrzad Davani. It premiered on the American Broadcasting Company (ABC) in the United States on February 22, 2022. In the episode, Ava and Janine disagree on how to run the after-school step class. Meanwhile, Gregory must reveal his secret when Barbara, Melissa, and Jacob plan a pizza eating competition.

== Plot ==
When Ava (Janelle James) takes over Janine's (Quinta Brunson) after-school step class, Janine realizes that the students prefer Ava's teaching style over hers. Ava redoes the routine for their upcoming school performance, but she does not show up on the day of the performance in order to take care of her grandmother. After the situation is clarified, the show goes forward. Meanwhile, Gregory (Tyler James Williams) feels alienated by the other staff members when it is revealed he does not like pizza and most other foods.

== Reception ==
Upon its initial broadcast on ABC, "Step Class" was viewed by 3.06 million viewers, slightly more than previous episodes, and the highest since the second episode. This rating earned the episode a 0.79 in the 18-49 rating demographics on the Nielsen ratings scale. The episode achieved a total of 3.8 million viewers.

The episode aired following Abbott Elementary's mid-season entry in the 2021–22 television season. Filming for the ninth episode took place between August 16 and November 5, 2021, in Los Angeles, California, along with the rest of the season. Like other episodes, interior scenes are filmed at Warner Bros. Studios in Burbank, California, with exterior shots of the series being inspired by Vermont Elementary School in Los Angeles.
