= Light Bulb (Abbott Elementary) =

- Abbott Elementary episode
- Episode no.: Season 1 Episode 2
- Directed by: Randall Einhorn
- Written by: Quinta Brunson
- Production code: T11.17153
- Original air date: January 4, 2022

Guest appearances
- Zack Fox as Tariq Temple; William Stanford Davis as Mr. Johnson; Nate' Jones as Amber Williams; Jim Gardner as himself

Episode chronology
← Previous "Pilot"	Next → "Wishlist"
- Abbott Elementary (season 1)

"Light Bulb" is the second episode of the American sitcom television series Abbott Elementary. It was written by series creator and star Quinta Brunson, and was directed by Randall Einhorn. It premiered on the American Broadcasting Company (ABC) in the United States on January 4, 2022. The episode follows Janine (Quinta Brunson), who attempts to fix a flickering light without the help of the school or electricians, and Gregory (Tyler James Williams) who must confront a parent of his class for bringing her son into school late.

The episode sees the first appearance of recurring characters, Tariq Temple and Amber Williams. The episode also sees a short cameo from Philadelphia broadcaster Jim Gardner, who appears in the cold open and is beloved by the staff of Abbott.

== Plot ==
Janine arrives at school with her boyfriend, Tariq (Zack Fox). She finds a student who does not want to walk down the hallway because of a flickering light. Mr. Johnson (William Stanford Davis) tells her that it is above his paygrade to fix it and that they will have to wait for an electrician to get the lights fixed; because of this, she decides to fix the light herself. In Gregory's class, a student arrives with his mother an hour late, and he tries but fails to call the attention of the mother and only manages to tell her that school starts earlier than when they arrived, to which she barely acknowledges. Barbara tells him that he simply needs to talk to the student's mother.

Janine finds a ladder and tries to fix the lights herself, but instead causes a partial power outage in the school. Barbara coaches Gregory into confronting Amber about her son's tardiness. He tells her that her son could fall behind and retake the grade, and she promises him that her son will be at school on time. In the electrical room, Janine fiddles with the circuit breakers in the panel box with the help of Jacob which causes all the remaining power to go out, including the air conditioning. Barbara and Melissa confront Janine after the outage; shortly before she faints due to having not eaten any food. Janine wakes up in the nurse's office. Janine finds that everybody else is outside due to the outage and the heat. Janine expresses her disappointment that after trying so hard to fix the issue with the lights, she instead managed to make things worse.

Janine tries calling Tariq but gets his voicemail. Shortly after, Gregory arrives and the two decide to grab dinner. Jacob sees the two leaving and invites himself to join. Just as they leave, they find that Mr. Johnson has fixed the lights.

== Reception ==
Upon its initial broadcast on ABC, "Light Bulb" received a total of 3.45 million viewers. Compared to the first episode, the second episode increased its viewership by 5.6 million viewers to 9 million after 35 days. Following DVR viewership totals, the total viewership within the first 35 days of its airing was 4.27 million. (Note: Live+7 ratings were unavailable, so Live+3 ratings have been used instead.) The episode has the highest viewership in the series overall. The episode was included as part of the show's submission for the Outstanding Comedy Series award.

The episode airs following its midseason entry in the 2021–22 television season; and following a winter break. Filming for the episode took place between August 16, and November 5, 2021, in Los Angeles, California. Like other episodes, interior scenes are filmed at Warner Bros. Studios, Burbank in Burbank, California, with exterior shots of the series being filmed in front of Vermont Elementary School in Los Angeles.

=== Critical response ===
Janelle Ureta of Tell-Tale TV complemented the series by stating that; ""Light Bulb," is more heart warming than hilarious, but given the state of the world at the moment, that is perfectly excusable. The funniest bits come from little, often silly, very specific, moments." However, Ureta critiqued the episodes use of slow-humor, by stating; "However, to establish itself as a top-tier comedy, the new ABC series needs to have funny jokes with a larger reach. Janine’s persistent idealism and Ava’s persistent inappropriate flirting aren't enough. On “Light Bulb," they make us want to yell at the screen to move-it-along. Ava's doomsday bunker is far more interesting and entertaining."
