= Wishlist (Abbott Elementary) =

- Abbott Elementary episode
- Episode no.: Season 1 Episode 3
- Directed by: Randall Einhorn
- Written by: Morgan Murphy
- Production code: T11.17154
- Original air date: January 11, 2022

Guest appearance
- William Stanford Davis as Mr. Johnson

Episode chronology
← Previous "Light Bulb"	Next → "New Tech"
- Abbott Elementary (season 1)

"Wishlist" is the third episode of the American sitcom television series Abbott Elementary. It was written by Morgan Murphy, and was directed by Randall Einhorn. It premiered on the American Broadcasting Company (ABC) in the United States on January 11, 2022. The episode follows Barbara (Sheryl Lee Ralph), who refuses to promote her teachers wishlist with the internet, despite push from Janine (Quinta Brunson) and Ava (Janelle James).

The episode is the first to feature William Stanford Davis as Mr. Johnson, outside of a minor role. Including him in a subplot with Jacob (Chris Perfetti), who hopes to turn an old printer into a planter.

== Plot ==
With Ava's (Janelle James) help, Janine (Quinta Brunson) makes a viral video for TikTok to get supplies for her classroom. After explaining the concept to a reluctant Barbara (Sheryl Lee Ralph), she asks Ava to secretly make a viral video for her, who also needs supplies but refuses any help. Jacob (Chris Perfetti) finds an old donated printer in the trash can and attempts to have it function as a planter, despite claims from Mr. Johnson (William Stanford Davis) that it won't work, and that it's nothing but trash.

Ava makes an exaggerated video of Barbara's situation, which also goes viral but creates an uncomfortable situation for her when Barbara is aggravated at the message sent by Ava. Elsewhere, Janine encourages Gregory (Tyler James Williams) to decorate his classroom; specifically with drawings given to him by his students.

== Reception ==
Upon its initial broadcast on ABC, "Wishlist" was watched by 2.97 million viewers, earning a 0.6 in the 18–49 rating demographics on the Nielson ratings scale. Compared to the previous two episodes, the third is the lowest viewed episode out of the first three.

The episode airs following its midseason entry in the 2021–22 television season. Filming for the episode took place between August 16, and November 5, 2021, in Los Angeles, California. Like other episodes, interior scenes are filmed at Warner Bros. Studios, Burbank in Burbank, California, with exterior shots of the series being filmed in front of Vermont Elementary School in Los Angeles.

=== Critical response ===
Janelle Ureta of Tell-Tale TV stated that with "Wishlist," both the show and the characters have "delightfully" found their groove, highlighting the decision to minimize Ava Coleman's "predatory skeezy-ness" with Gregory Eddie. "On 'Wishlist,' we see Ava interacting with Janine and behind her desk. That works well to allow her character to develop in a more quirky and less creepy direction." Ureta gave the episode a rating of 5 stars out of 5, and concluded that the series' core humor source "locks into place at the same time the show sheds what was holding it back from being five-star."
