= List of Abbott Elementary characters =

Abbott Elementary is an American television series created by Quinta Brunson for ABC. It stars Brunson as a second grade teacher at Abbott Elementary, a fictional predominantly Black school in Philadelphia. The ensemble cast includes Tyler James Williams, Janelle James, Lisa Ann Walter, Chris Perfetti, Sheryl Lee Ralph and William Stanford Davis. The following is a list of characters, including the main cast and those who appear alongside the main cast in the series.

== Cast overview ==
Key
Main cast (credited)
Recurring cast (3 or more episodes)
Guest cast (1–2 episodes)

Abbott Elementary main cast and characters
Actor	Character	Seasons						First appearance
Actor	Character	1	2	3	4	5	6	First appearance
Main characters
Quinta Brunson	Janine Teagues	Main	Main	Main	Main	Main	Main	"Pilot"
Tyler James Williams	Gregory Eddie	Main	Main	Main	Main	Main	Main	"Pilot"
Janelle James	Ava Coleman	Main	Main	Main	Main	Main	Main	"Pilot"
Lisa Ann Walter	Melissa Schemmenti	Main	Main	Main	Main	Main	Main	"Pilot"
Chris Perfetti	Jacob Hill	Main	Main	Main	Main	Main	Main	"Pilot"
Sheryl Lee Ralph	Barbara Howard	Main	Main	Main	Main	Main	Main	"Pilot"
William Stanford Davis	Mr. Johnson	Recurring	Main	Main	Main	Main	Main	"Pilot"
Recurring characters
Kate Peterman	Tina Schwartz	Guest	Recurring			Guest	TBA	"Pilot"
Zack Fox	Tariq Temple	Recurring	Recurring	Recurring	Recurring	Recurring	Guest	"Light Bulb"
Nikea Gamby-Turner	Shanae	Guest	Recurring	Guest	Guest	Guest	TBA	"Light Bulb"
Naté Jones	Amber	Guest	Recurring		Guest			"Light Bulb"
Lela Hoffmeister	Courtney Pierce	Guest	Guest	Guest	Guest	Recurring	Guest	"Student Transfer"
Bruno Amato	Gary	Guest	Guest	Guest	Guest			"Gifted Program"
Orlando Jones	Martin Eddie	Guest	Guest		Guest			"Work Family"
Larry Owens	Zach	Guest	Guest	Guest	Guest			"Desking"
Lauren Weedman	Kristen Marie Schemmenti		Recurring		Guest			"Wrong Delivery"
Keyla Monterroso Mejia	Ashley Garcia		Recurring			Guest	TBA	"Story Samurai"
Zakai Biagas Bey	Clarence		Recurring					"Story Samurai"
Courtney Taylor	Erika		Recurring	Recurring	Guest	Guest	TBA	"Candy Zombies"
Jerry Minor	Joseph Morton		Recurring	Recurring	Recurring	Recurring	Recurring	"Egg Drop"
Raven Goodwin	Krystal		Guest		Recurring	Guest	TBA	"Egg Drop"
Taylor Garron	Tasha Hoffman		Guest		Recurring	Recurring	Guest	"Sick Day"
Vince Staples	Maurice "Mo"		Recurring					"Holiday Hookah"
Mike O'Malley	Captain Robinson		Guest	Guest	Recurring	Guest	Guest	"Fire"
June Diane Raphael	Elizabeth Washington		Guest	Guest	Guest			"Educator of the Year"
Taraji P. Henson	Vanetta Teagues		Guest	Guest		Guest	TBA	"Mom"
Josh Segarra	Manny			Recurring	Recurring			"Career Day, Part 1"
Kimia Behpoornia	Emily			Recurring		Guest	TBA	"Career Day, Part 1"
Benjamin Norris	Simon			Recurring	Guest	Recurring	TBA	"Career Day, Part 1"
Mason Renfro	Alex Perkins			Recurring	Guest	Guest	TBA	"Career Day, Part 1"
Ben Onyx Dowdy	Warren			Recurring	Guest		Guest	"Gregory's Garden Goofballs"
Cree Summer	Rosalyn Inez			Guest	Recurring	Guest	TBA	"Librarian"
Keegan-Michael Key	John Reynolds			Recurring				"Panel"
Karan Soni	Avi			Recurring				"Panel"
Tatyana Ali	Crystal Riley			Guest	Recurring			"Panel"
Pam Trotter	Dia			Recurring	Recurring	Recurring	Guest	"Alex"
Matt Oberg	Miles Nathaniel				Recurring			"Back to School"
Matthew Law	O'Shon				Recurring	Recurring	Guest	"Class Pet"
Keith David	Frank Coleman				Recurring			"Winter Show"
Logan Carter	R.J. McCann				Recurring			"Testing"
Jaboukie Young-White	Elijah				Guest	Guest	Guest	"Karaoke"
Luke Tennie	Dominic Clark					Recurring	Guest	"Team Building"
Marcella Arguello	Elena Alomar					Recurring	Guest	"Cheating"

== Main characters ==
=== Janine Teagues ===
Janine Teagues
- First appearance: "Pilot"; 1x01, December 7, 2021
- Portrayed by: Quinta Brunson

In-universe information
- Gender: Female
- Occupation: Second-grade teacher School District Fellowship (season 3)
- Family: Vanetta Teagues (mother); Ayesha Teagues (sister)
- Significant others: Maurice (ex-boyfriend); Tariq Temple (ex-boyfriend); Gregory Eddie (boyfriend)

Janine Teagues is the plucky and optimistic lead of the series who works as a second-grade teacher at Abbott Elementary. Throughout the series she remains unjaded by all of the things the school lacks and strives to make sure her students have enough to learn and grow. While helping the students of Abbott, Janine also deals with challenges and relationships within her personal life.

During the events of the first season, Janine is looked over by the staff of Abbott, particularly Ava who bullies her numerous times. Throughout the season, she dates Tariq, whom she has been in a relationship with since eighth grade. She struggles with the thought of ending her relationship with Tariq; however, other Abbott staff believe the two should break up. At the end of the season, she breaks up with him when he decides to move to New York City to pursue his career as a professional rapper. In season 2, Janine struggles to get over Tariq and has trouble paying her rent, since she originally split the bill monthly with Tariq. When trying to rekindle Melissa's relationship with her sister, Janine describes her complicated family history, with a mother who never paid her any attention and a sister who lives in another state. She begins regularly hanging out with Jacob and Erika, an old mutual friend of Tariq, who supports Janine and invites her to parties to increase her social mobility. She dates Gregory's friend Maurice throughout the season, which prompts unspoken jealousy. After Janine breaks up with Maurice, she and Gregory confess their feelings for one another but agree to remain friends for personal growth. In the third season, Janine and Gregory move past their awkward conversations as she begins a job working for the Philadelphia school system. In the fourth season, Janine begins dating Gregory.

==== Relationship with Gregory ====
While hinted at in the pilot episode, Janine and Gregory have a will-they-won't-they dynamic that is apparent in almost every episode. They teach classes next to each other and have developed a special bond. They almost share a kiss during the Christmas episode, but they are interrupted by Amber. After Gregory breaks up with Amber, he shares a drunken kiss with Janine at a teacher conference but they vow to ignore it.

When asked by late-night host James Corden about the relationship between Gregory and Janine, Tyler James Williams said:

It depends how long they want us to go. I can confirm this—that Quinta has not made a decision about ‘will they or won’t they?’ I think everyone assumes that it’s a ‘will they?’, that they will eventually, but she is just like… ‘I’m not positive they’ll go that way.

Their relationship has been compared to that of Jim Halpert and Pam Beesly from The Office, which shares a similar mockumentary presentation style with Abbott Elementary. They officially begin dating during the fourth season premiere. In the fifth season, Gregory moves into Janine's apartment; also in the fifth season, the characters briefly fall out with one another and then reconcile.

=== Gregory Eddie ===
Gregory Eddie
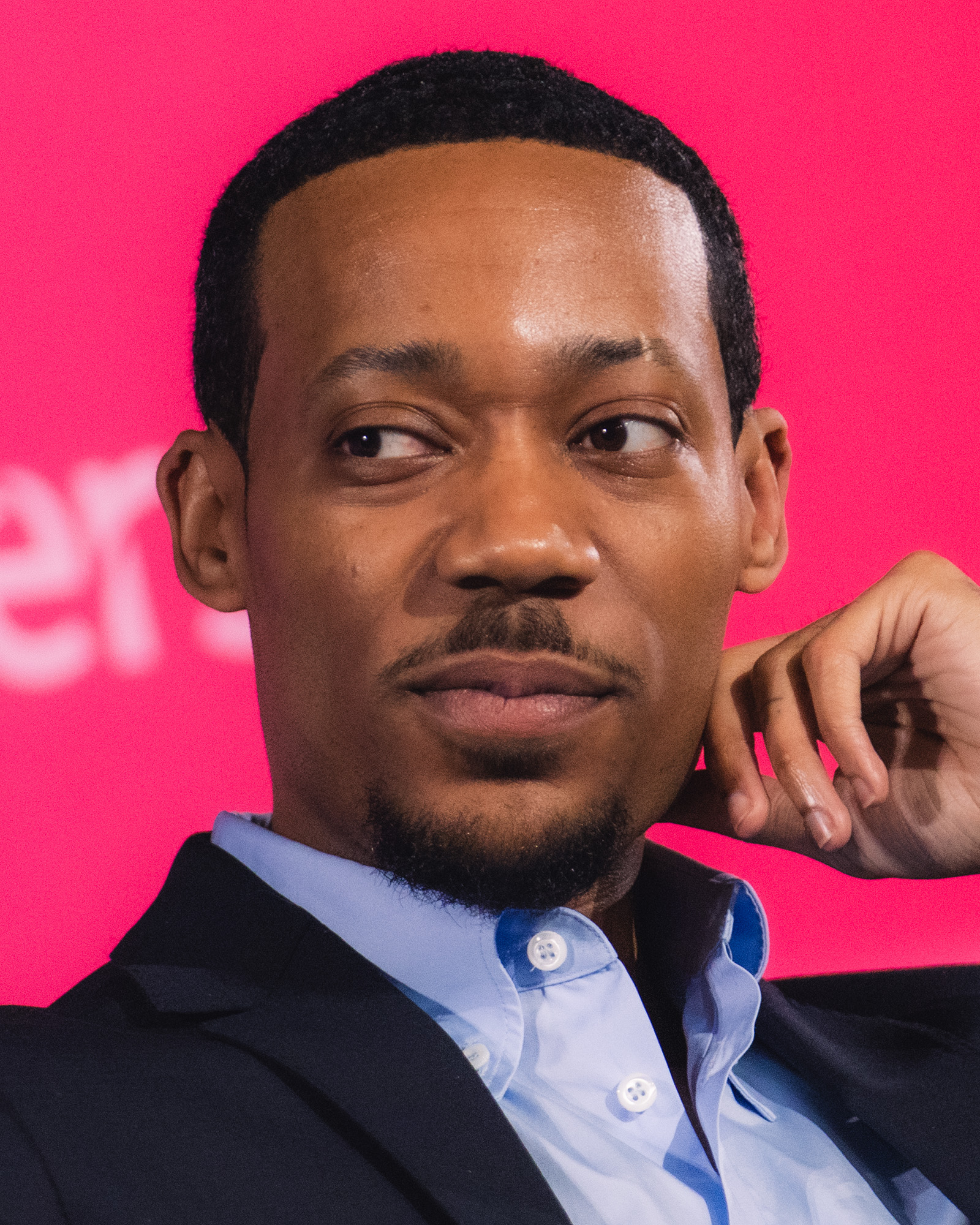
- First appearance: "Pilot"; 1x01, December 7, 2021
- Portrayed by: Tyler James Williams

In-universe information
- Gender: Male
- Occupation: Substitute teacher (season 1); First-grade teacher (season 2–5); Interim principal (season 4); Assistant principal (Season 5–)
- Family: Martin Eddie (father); Faith Eddie (mother; deceased)
- Significant others: Amber Williams (ex-girlfriend); Taylor Howard (ex-girlfriend); Janine Teagues (girlfriend)

Gregory Thompson Eddie is the co-lead of the series and a substitute, later a full-time first grade teacher at Abbott. Gregory moves to Philadelphia from Baltimore in the first episode. Gregory harbors a crush on Janine, however at first he hides it well. When he arrives at Abbott during the pilot episode, Gregory reveals that he originally applied to be the school's principal and is upset that Ava was hired over him, since she is unqualified.

In the first season, Gregory is hired as a substitute teacher for Tina. He immediately befriends Janine, who teaches a class beside his. Gregory receives a phone call from his unsupportive father (portrayed by Orlando Jones) who tells him that he should leave his career of teaching and pursue a more stable career with him as a gardener. He also meets Barbara's daughter Taylor, whom he begins dating. He applies to be a full-time teacher in the season finale, he ultimately gets the job because the school is unable to find another replacement for Tina. During the second season, Gregory begins his first year at Abbott as a full-time teacher and continues to date Taylor; however later, Taylor breaks up with him. Following his breakup with Taylor, Gregory begins dating Amber, the parent of a student in Janine's class much to her unspoken jealousy. After his breakup with Amber, Gregory confesses his feelings for Janine, who reciprocates them but argues that they should remain friends for the time being. In the following seasons, their relationship continues to develop. In season 4, after Ava is fired by the district, Gregory becomes the interim principal. However, Gregory struggles in this position due to his awkwardness in social interactions. In addition, Gregory also shows obsession with planning and does not likes many common food items like pizza. Creator Quinta Brunson has stated that Gregory's palate was modelled on the real-life scenario of one of their crew writers, Brian Rubenstein, who reportedly hated food itself, and from Tyler himself, who has confessed that he did not like chocolate. In season 5, Gregory moves into Janine's apartment as her live-in partner, but soon break up with one another due to disagreements over their plans for spending during the holidays. At the end of the season, however, they reconcile, and Gregory purchases an engagement ring. In the final episode of season 5, Ava promotes Gregory to the position of assistant principal.

=== Ava Coleman ===
Ava Coleman
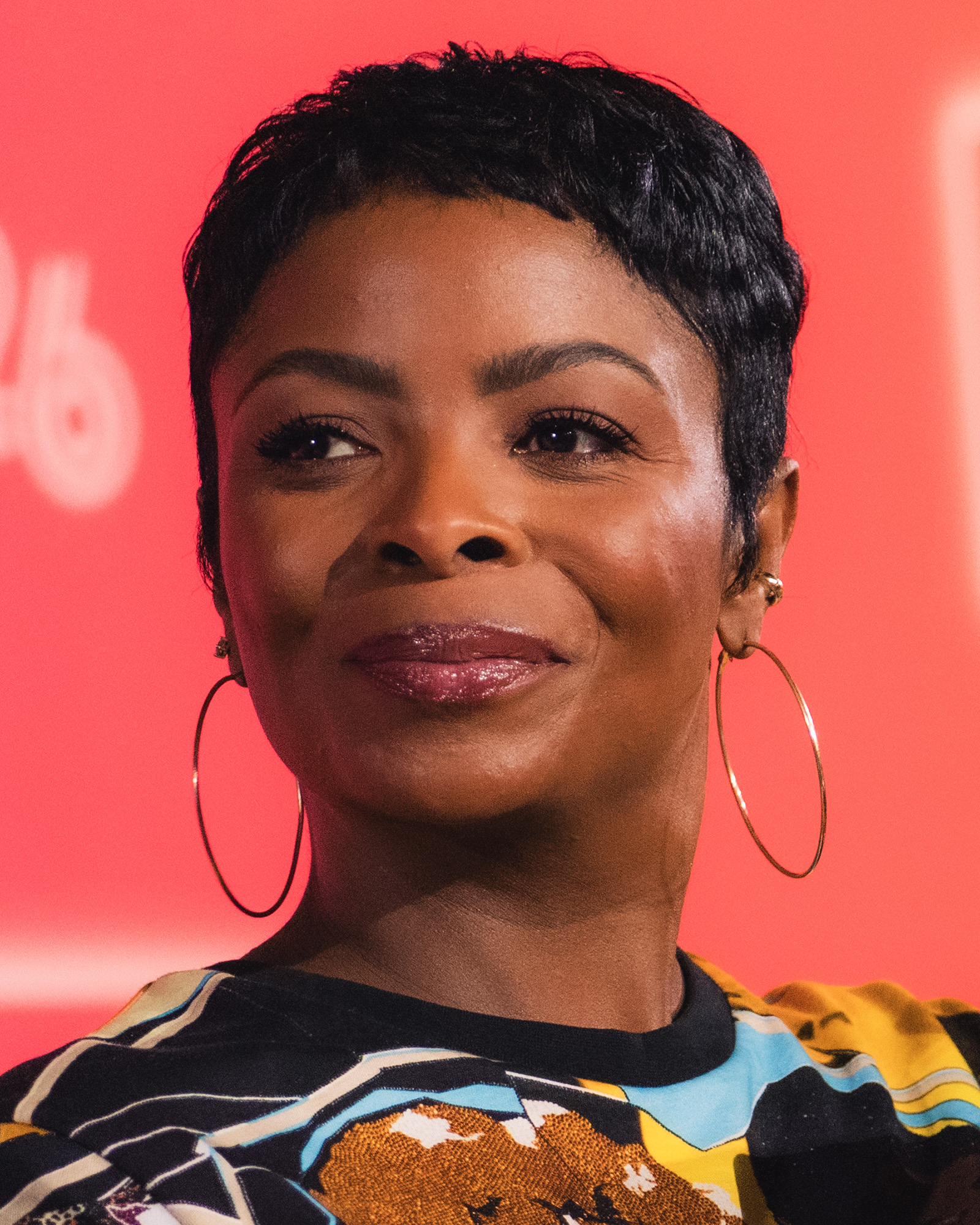
- First appearance: "Pilot"; 1x01, December 7, 2021
- Portrayed by: Janelle James

In-universe information
- Gender: Female
- Occupation: Principal
- Family: Frank Coleman (father); Lorraine (grandmother)
- Significant others: Andre Iguodala (ex-boyfriend); O'Shon (boyfriend)

Ava Eva Coleman is the school's chaotic, insensitive, grossly incompetent, careless, narcissistic, and tone-deaf principal. She also harbors a casual sexual attraction to Gregory, which she does not hide well; this makes him uncomfortable. She is also an avid user of social media and often focuses on it rather than her responsibilities as principal. Apart from being the school principal, she also runs a side business selling clothing online (initially through her website, but now through social media), hence keeps a cabinet filled with her wares in her office chamber.

The first season showcases Ava's carelessness and antics on full display. She spends her entire time doing livestreaming on Instagram, making TikTok videos, watching Love Island and bullying the staff, especially Janine. During the pilot episode, it is revealed that Ava obtained her job as principal after blackmailing the superintendent, whom she caught cheating on his wife. However, the superintendent later visits Abbott and tells Ava that he has divorced his wife and is now married to the woman he was caught with by Ava, and that she is at risk of losing her job. In the penultimate episode of the first season, Ava wins over the district and the superintendent, and keeps her job. Following her successful presentation to the district, Ava continues her normal antics in the second season, although as the season progresses, it becomes clear that she is engaging with the job more and that she is developing skills as a principal. She also becomes more compassionate towards children, giving them money for lunches and clothes and organizing a fundraising campaign for the school by arranging students to sell candy at the local mall, a sharp contrast from the first season, where she pilfered the funds sent by the district board instead of providing the staff with necessary items. However, she gets into an argument with Barbara after the latter is publicly berated by her fellow churchgoer (who also happened to be a district board member) who was overcharged by a student acting upon Ava's instructions. Ava defends her amoral advice by describing her own struggles with poverty and stating that the kid in question was in desperate need of money due to his family's financial strain. After substituting for Janine when she is out sick, and sitting in on Jacob's class to investigate allegations of racism against him, Ava realizes that she actually likes her job and learning and decides to start studying for the principal's certification she should have had to get the job in the first place. In season 3, she references having attended Harvard University. It is eventually revealed that she did not attend the university, but used their Wi-Fi to complete an online course in Master of Education. After the course, her personality is temporarily changed, focusing more on supervision and principal responsibilities; staff are relieved when she returns to her usual apathy. Ava also starts to show more care and compassion for her staff, and she starts supporting them in their activities and personal lives. In season 4, she blackmails Miles Nathaniel in order to procure computers for the impoverished school. At the end of the season, the district authorities find out about Ava's acceptance of the bribed computers and fire her, but the staff and students of Abbott, alongside the parents and the local community, rally behind her, resulting in her reinstatement as principal.

Ava maintains an intense rivalry with Crystal, her sorority sister from Grand Canyon University, who works as a principal in another similarly impoverished public school called Liberty Rings in Philadelphia. In the fourth season, when Ava is unexpectedly invited to a prestigious meeting of the district educators in recognition of her positive impacts (like increased student attendance and grades) to Abbott Elementary, she overhears Crystal, frustrated at Ava's success, bemoaning the loss of opportunity to obtain funding for her impoverished school. Ava, who manages to get a generous amount of aid sanctioned for Abbott Elementary, insists that the aid material be divide among themselves, but Crystal refuses.

A writer for the show is also named Ava Coleman, but this is a coincidence as Coleman started writing for the show in Season 2.

=== Melissa Schemmenti ===
Melissa Schemmenti
- First appearance: "Pilot"; 1x01, December 7, 2021
- Portrayed by: Lisa Ann Walter

In-universe information
- Gender: Female
- Occupation: Second-grade teacher (seasons 1-4); Sixth-grade math teacher (season 5)
- Family: Teresa Schemmenti (mother); Kristen Marie Schemmenti (sister)
- Spouse: Joe (divorced)
- Significant others: Gary (ex-boyfriend); Captain Robinson (boyfriend)

Melissa Ann Caterina Schemmenti is a second-grade teacher at Abbott, who has a large Italian-American family with questionable connections. She has a close connection with Barbara, with both being veteran teachers at Abbott. Melissa's family is native to the local fire department, and is referenced in numerous episodes. However, she has a somewhat strained relationship with her family due to her status as a divorcée.

During the first season, much of the humor surrounding Melissa's character concerns her family's questionable connections to local municipal agencies and criminal elements. Although these connections generally worry her colleagues, they rarely question her connections since they often benefit the school. Melissa begins going out with the vending machine stocker, Gary, at the end of the first season; the relationship continues into the second and third seasons, until their ultimate breakup after Melissa tells Gary that she does not ever want to get remarried. In the second season, when classes get combined due to a teacher shortage, Melissa receives ten third-grade students in her second-grade class. This proves to be too difficult to keep up with on her own, and the school offers her an aide in the distracting and childish Ashley Garcia, who only causes more problems for Melissa. Melissa is revealed to have a sister, Kristen Marie, a teacher at Addington Elementary, a local charter school with which Abbott Elementary is in competition, with whom she has a rivalry. When Janine attempts to salvage their bond, Melissa reveals that Kristen Marie left her alone with the responsibilities of her sick grandmother, and disrespected her when the funeral came around. Beginning in the fourth season, Melissa becomes attached to her class' pet guinea pig, whom she names Sweet Cheeks. She includes the guinea pig in various events at the school, even dressing up as Sweet Cheeks for Halloween. In the fifth season, she is moved to teaching mathematics at sixth grade, facing new challenges on how to deal with adolescent children.

=== Jacob Hill ===
Jacob Hill
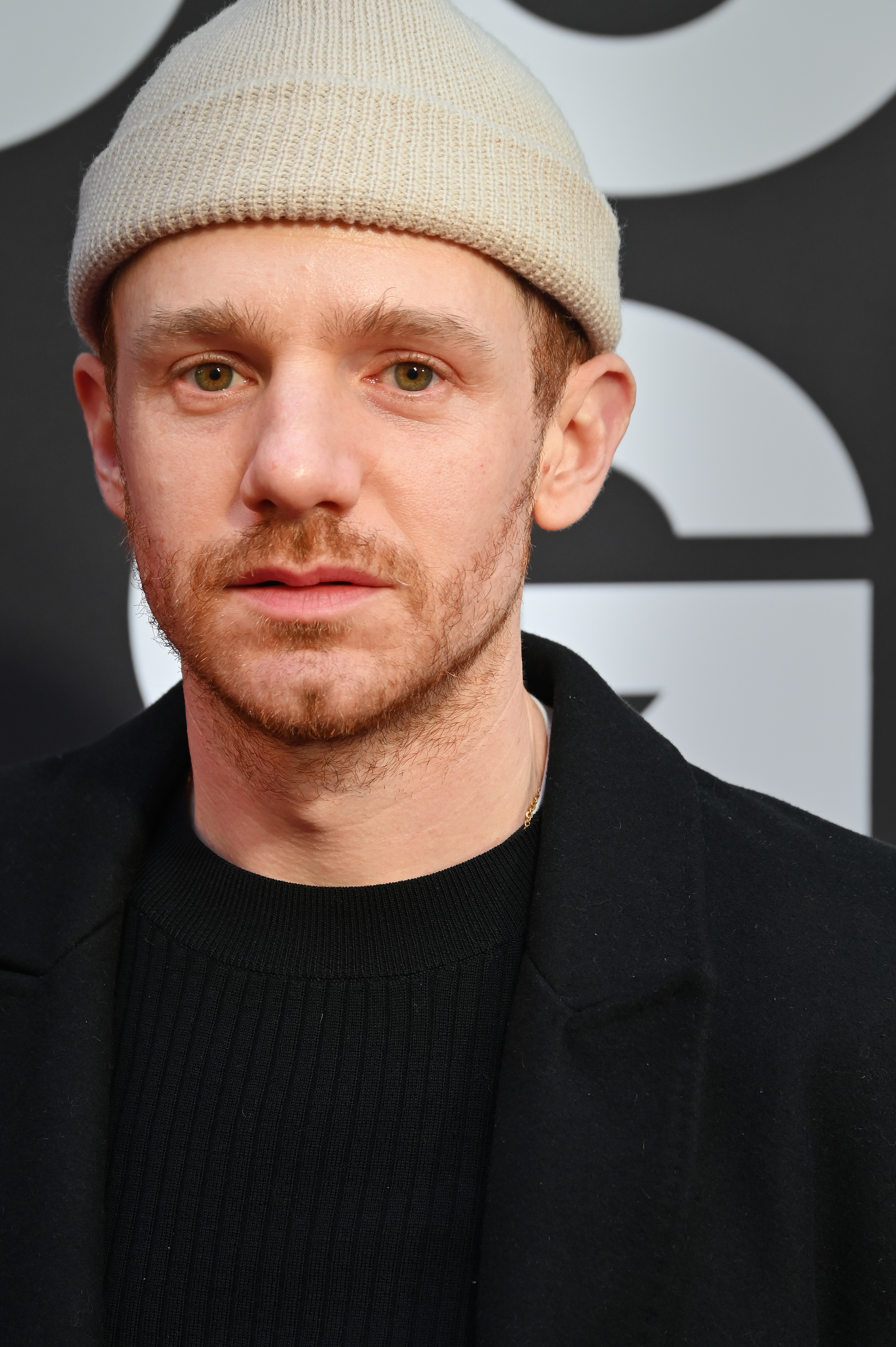
- First appearance: "Pilot"; 1x01, December 7, 2021
- Portrayed by: Chris Perfetti

In-universe information
- Gender: Male
- Occupation: History teacher
- Family: Caleb Hill (brother)
- Significant others: Zach (ex-boyfriend); Avi (ex-boyfriend); Elijah (boyfriend)

Jacob Merrill Hill is an awkward and occasionally pessimistic history teacher at Abbott who supports Janine and her mission. Being a white male teacher in a school that predominantly caters to black children, Jacob sometimes experiences reverse discrimination, especially from parents of Abbott students, with one parent even objecting to him teaching black history in Black History Month due to his race. However, Principal Ava defends him on that occasion.

In the first season, Jacob reveals that he is one of two teachers remaining from a large number of new teachers hired in the previous year; the other being Janine. He mentions his boyfriend Zach to Janine, which leads to Janine being upset that he never mentioned him prior. He introduces his boyfriend Zach to the staff to help stop the spread of a TikTok trend. In the second season, Jacob continues to support Janine after a grant is given to the school thanks to Barbara. When an educational dance troupe visits Abbott, Jacob reveals that he is a former member of the 'Story Samurai' that travels from school to school. In "Librarian" he and Melissa become roommates and then friends after Jacob and Zach break up.

=== Barbara Howard ===
Barbara Howard
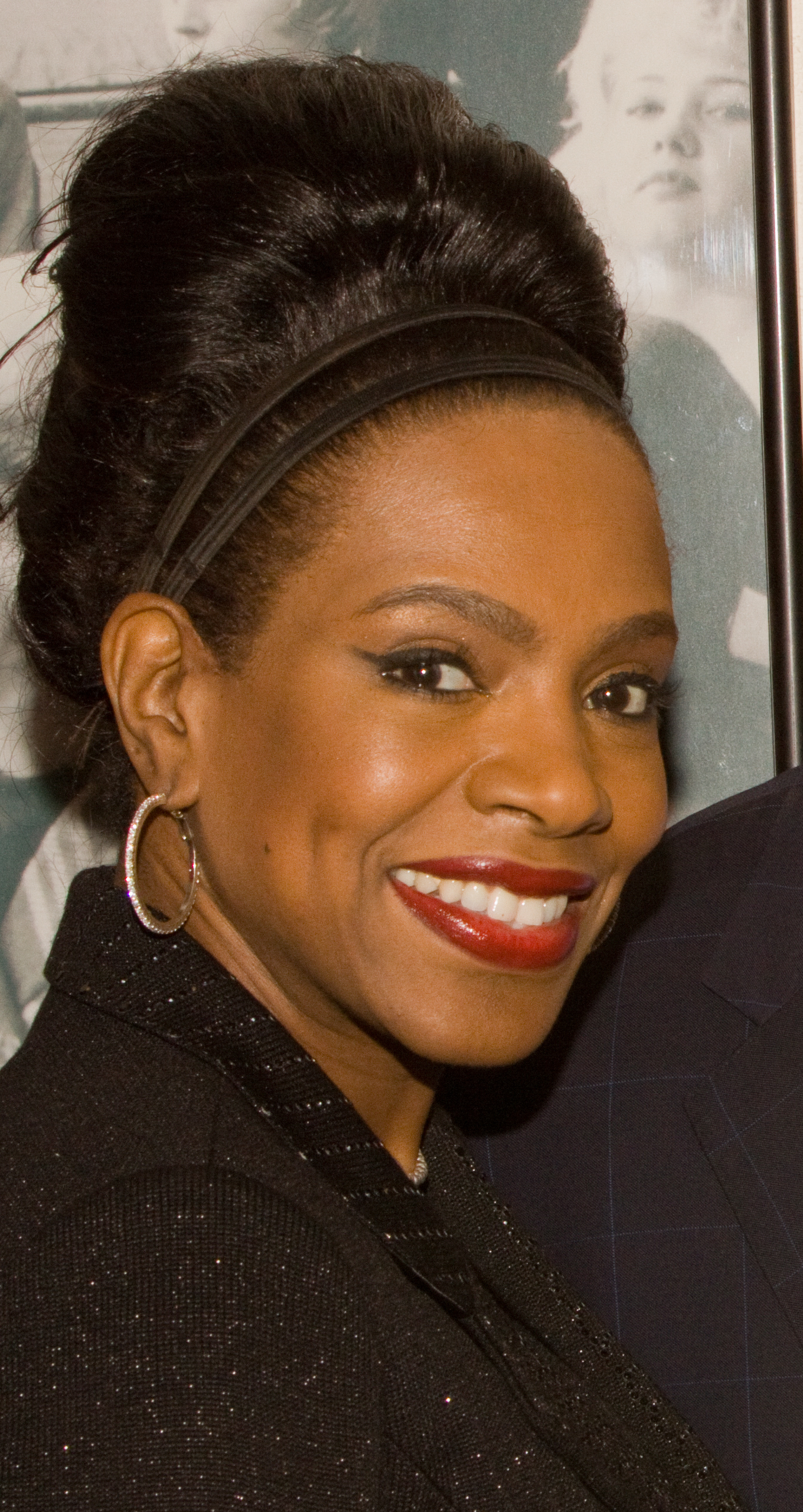
- First appearance: "Pilot"; 1x01, December 7, 2021
- Portrayed by: Sheryl Lee Ralph

In-universe information
- Gender: Female
- Occupation: Kindergarten teacher Music teacher (seasons 4-5)
- Spouse: Gerald Howard
- Children: Taylor Howard; Gina Howard

Barbara Howard is an old-school and strictly religious kindergarten teacher whom Janine looks up to. Barbara is based upon Quinta Brunson's mother who was also a teacher. Having served for 20 years at Abbott Elementary, she and Melissa (her close friend) are the seniormost faculty in the school. Although vocal about her Christian faith (although her denomination isn't mentioned), it only rarely causes friction in her professional relationships.

During the first season, Barbara reveals that she is wary of new technology and prefers to teach the way she has for her entire career. Barbara cheats a new system provided by the school and is forced to come clean for her mistakes of not wanting to use the new program. Barbara has a husband named Gerald (portrayed by Richard Brooks) who visits her for lunch on occasion. For an open house, her daughter Taylor visits and she is displeased with her career choice. Taylor eventually begins dating Gregory. She blackmails school board member Delisha Sloss into giving the school a loan, while later pondering retirement while on the school field trip to the zoo during the season finale; ultimately she decides to stay with Abbott.

In the second season, Barbara is forced to be the middleman in the relationship of Taylor and Gregory and has to be the one to tell Gregory that their relationship is over. A former student of Barbara named Draemond Winding visits after his charter school attack ad negatively highlights Abbott. He later targets Abbott to become a charter school. In the aforementioned ad, all teachers are portrayed negatively apart from Barbara, whom Draemond wants to recruit for his own school, as gratitude for helping him in times of distress, but Barbara strictly refuses to leave Abbott. Her husband Gerald has a health scare later in the season, as she reveals to Melissa that he was tested for prostate cancer; however she reveals the test came back negative, but it still caused them to worry for his health. It is also shown that Barbara has been getting mistreated by her conservative choir group when she wants to sing a solo because they think she is too "modern" for them due to her friendship with Melissa, a divorcée, and Jacob, who is gay. The third season also shows that in addition to her morally uptight persona, she also has a completely different facet of personality, which is never shown on screen but which she refers to as 'Sea Barbara' (referencing its appearance when Barbara took a cruise to Jamaica over the summer). At the end of season 4, she briefly substitutes for the music class at Abbott, and in season 5, she takes over full-time.

A running gag of the show is Barbara confusing the names of Hollywood celebrities, which often ends up in her falsely believing that some white celebrities are black. This was reportedly inspired from Barbara's actress Sheryl herself.

=== Mr. Johnson ===
Mr. Johnson
- First appearance: "Pilot"; 1x01, December 7, 2021
- Portrayed by: William Stanford Davis

In-universe information
- Gender: Male
- Occupation: Custodian

Mr. Johnson is the school's eccentric, but surprisingly talented, janitor. After being credited as a guest star during the first season, William Stanford Davis was upped to a series regular for the second season.

Not much is known about Mr. Johnson outside of Abbott, but he believes in conspiracy theories and shares them with the students despite the teachers being uncomfortable with his suspicions. He once convinced Jacob that the ghost of the former janitor lives in the basement. In one episode, he casually mentions being an ex-Mormon. In season 5, Mr. Johnson is romantically linked with a female janitor, Carol (played by Khandi Alexander), who was hired for the time the school had to shift out of its premises to an abandoned shopping mall.

== Additional school staff ==
=== Introduced in season 1 ===
==== Tina Schwartz ====
- Portrayed by Kate Peterman

Tina Schwartz is an Abbott teacher who is fired for physically attacking a student during the pilot episode. She returns in "Delivery Day", revealing that she attended therapy and now works at a more affluent charter school, Addington Elementary. She is featured in the attack ad made against Abbott, orchestrated by Draemond.

==== Chanae and Devin ====
- Portrayed by Nikea Gamby-Turner and Reggie Conquest

Chanae and Devin are underpaid cafeteria workers at Abbott, who find Janine overly pushy and mildly annoying. In "Art Teacher", Devin refuses to allow Jacob and Barbara to make new menu items for the cafeteria, as he and the rest of the cafeteria staff have no time to prepare extra food. He also disrespectfully dismisses Jacob and Barbara's attempts of extending help with the meals.

==== Sahar ====
- Portrayed by Mitra Jouhari

Sahar is Janine's friend who briefly works at Abbott as a volunteer art teacher during the events of "Art Teacher". She and Melissa disagree over the latter's Peter Rabbit project, and though Janine agrees with Melissa, she finds it hard to turn down Sahar's ideas. When Sahar makes an impressive art piece using the books Melissa bought, Janine finally stands up to her. Her real name is revealed to be Sarah.

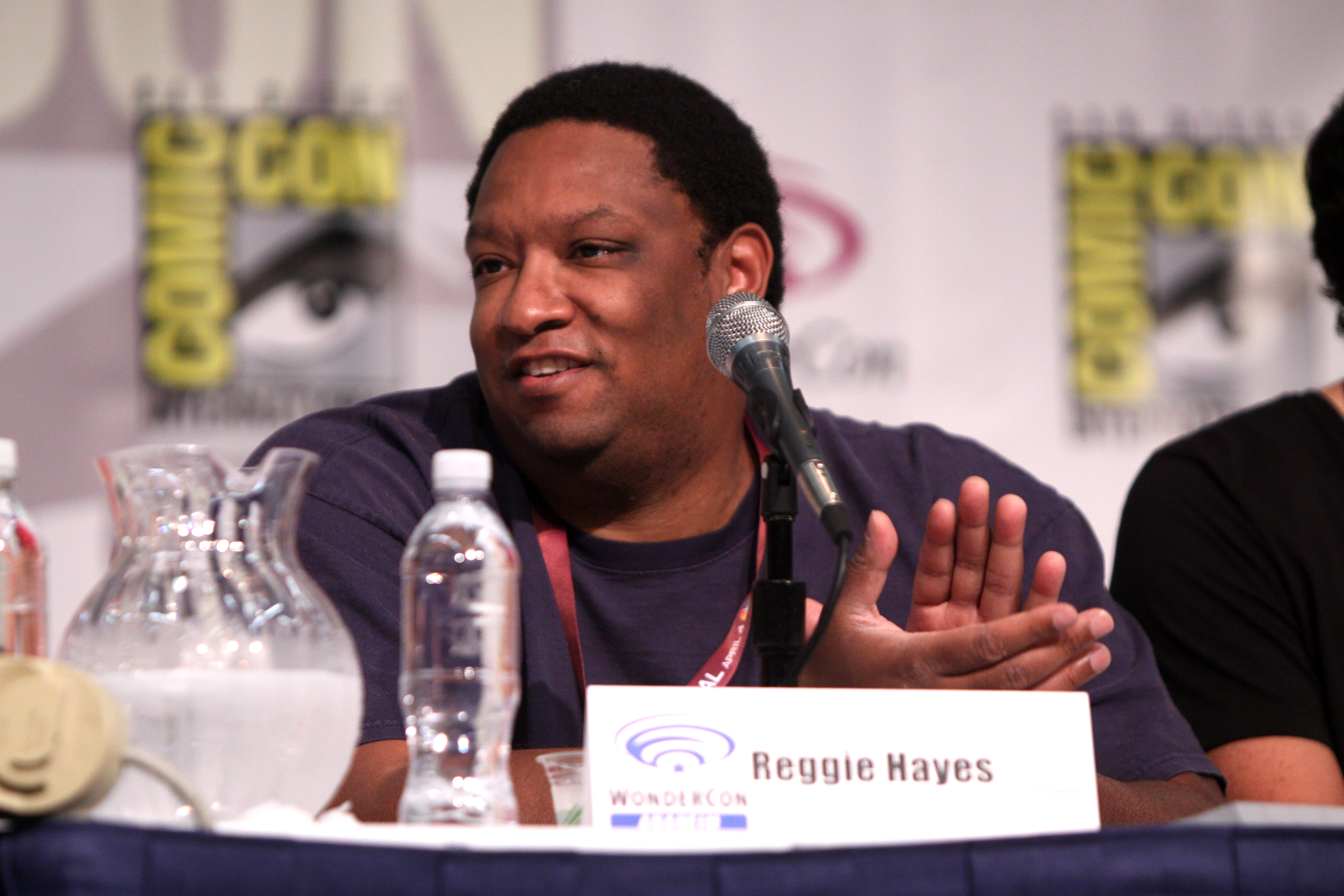
Reggie Hayes (pictured) portrayed Denzel Collins during the first season

==== Denzel Collins ====
- Portrayed by Reggie Hayes

Denzel Collins is the school's superintendent during the first season, who is blackmailed by Ava, resulting in her position as principal; after she caught him in a intimate condition with a deaconess at the church. However, he reveals to Ava that he had married the deaconess in question and divorced his wife in "Open House" which puts her in a tough position. He later allows Ava to keep her job as principal, but is still salty towards her and refuses to grant financial assistance to Abbott Elementary as long as Ava remains principal.

==== Alley Williams ====
- Portrayed by Ambrit Millhouse

Alley Williams is a minor recurring teacher at Abbott who has been a teacher for nine years. She only makes an appearance in one episode during the first season, however she becomes a recurring character during the second season. She is mentioned in "Attack Ad", where Jacob and Gregory talk about a parent of Alley's student who was arrested for protesting at a strip club.

==== Delisha Sloss ====
- Portrayed by Shirley Jordan

Delisha Sloss is a member of the school board and a member of Barbara's church. In "Ava vs. Superintendent", after the superintendent refuses to grant funding to Abbott Elementary, it is revealed that Barbara managed to obtain a decent amount of aid by threatening to reveal about Delisha's stealing from the church funds. Delisha reappears during the second season; being scammed by at the mall by a student (acting upon the instructions of Ava) participating in a fundraiser, for which she publicly berates Barbara.

=== Introduced in season 2 ===
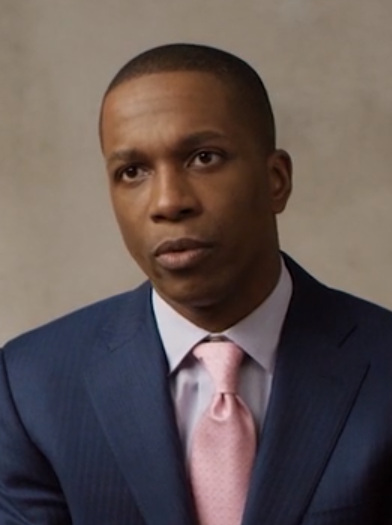
Leslie Odom Jr. (pictured) is introduced as Draemond Winding during the second season

==== Ashley Garcia ====
- Portrayed by Keyla Monterroso Mejia

Ashley Garcia is a childish and easily distracted teachers aide that is hired by the district for Melissa after she struggled to maintain her combined second and third grade classes. She befriends Ava after buying a shirt from her now defunct web-store. In "Candy Zombies", much to Melissa's chagrin, who wanted to have her gone. Ashley is put in charge of watching the bags of candy, however she is distracted by her phone and the candy is stolen and distributed amongst the students, causing a massive chaos. She leaves after this incident but reappears in season 5, this time as an aide for Janine, who is struggling to keep up with the increased number of students in the class. Ashley showed no improvement from her previous experience at Abbot and chaos occurred again due to her behavior.

==== Draemond Winding ====
- Portrayed by Leslie Odom Jr.

Draemond Winding is the owner of Legendary Schools, a company that runs charter schools in Philadelphia, including Addington Elementary. He plans to make Abbott a charter school. He is a former student of Barbara and was a student in her first class at Abbott. He reassures her that his plan will help her, but she insists that it will only cause more problems for the school and its teachers. He appears at an open house in hopes of convincing parents to support his plans, however they turn against him and rally in support of Abbott after questioning charter schools as a whole.

==== Venus ====
- Portrayed by Erika T. Johnson

Venus is a staff member of Abbott who works closely with Ava, typically delivering mail to her office during important occasions.

==== Joseph Morton ====
- Portrayed by Jerry Minor

Joseph Morton, or more commonly known as Mr. Morton, is an eighth grade science teacher who works with Jacob, despite their butting-head relationship. First appearing in "Egg Drop", he is annoyed with Janine for insisting her class take part in his egg drop experiment that he is conducting with his class. He does not like Jacob and both have a passive aggressive relationship with one another. He reappears in the third season, having had a troublesome marriage fallout over the summer. The teachers observe as he becomes increasingly misogynistic and questionable throughout the school year. He is seen serving as a barrier in the developments of Janine and Gregory's relationship by explaining that his wife, a former co-worker, drove them apart despite initially being fully in love with one another.

==== Tasha Hoffman ====
- Portrayed by Taylor Garron

Tasha Hoffman is a teacher at Abbott who typically avoids Janine, and is very briefly befriended by Melissa and Barbara when she is away. Jacob takes a disliking to her, given her disrespect towards Janine. She returns as a recurring character in the fourth season.

=== Introduced in season 3 ===
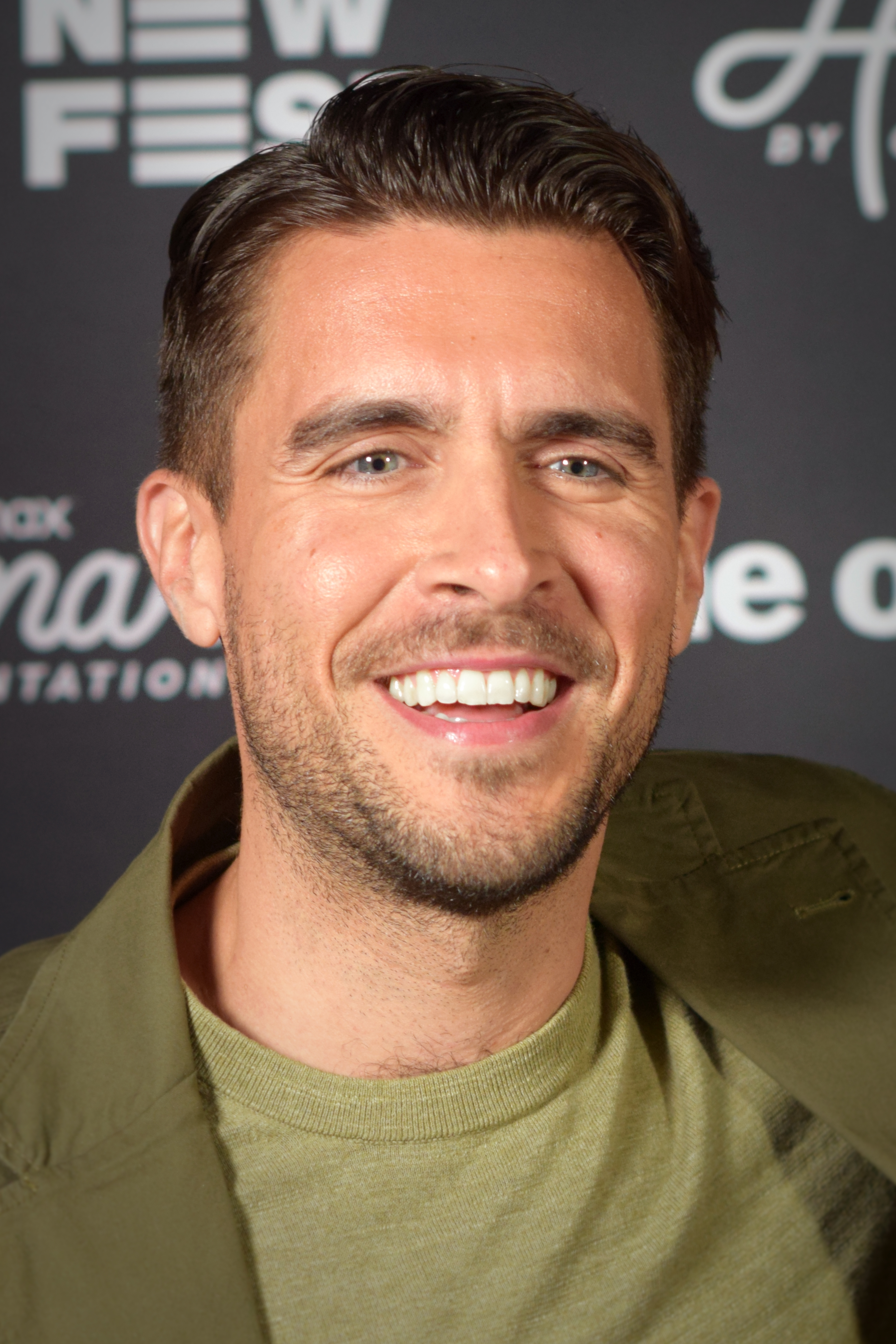
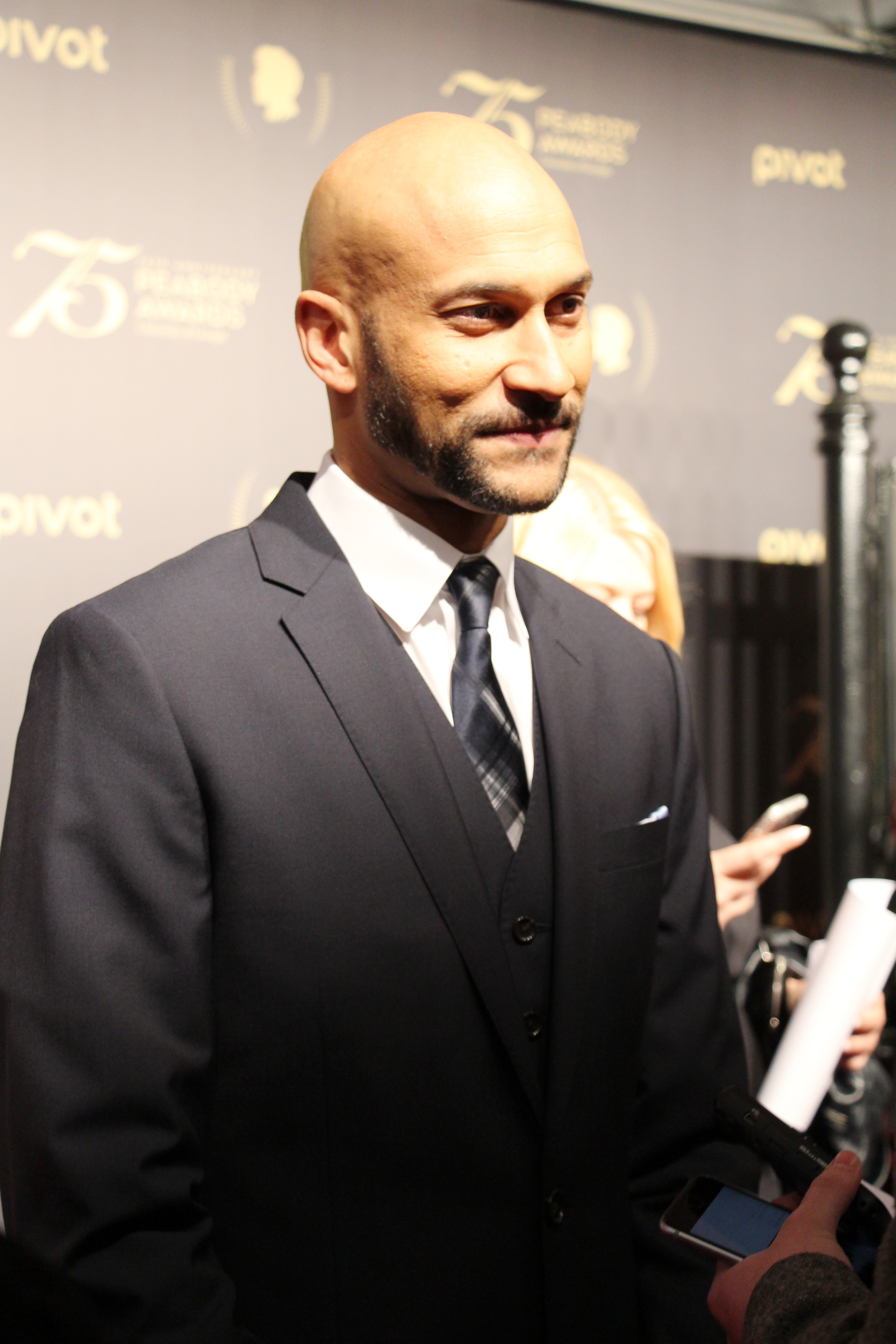
Josh Segarra and Keegan-Michael Key (both pictured) are introduced as Manny and Superintendent John Reynolds respectively, during the third season

==== Manny ====
- Portrayed by Josh Segarra

Manny is the leader of a group of school district representatives for Philadelphia that come to Abbott in hopes of improving its quality. When Barbara pushes their agenda back, he tells her that his mother was a teacher and was inspired by her to help other educators. Throughout the season, Gregory worries that Manny has a thing for Janine, setting him up as a romantic rival.

==== Simon Willis ====
- Portrayed by Benjamin Norris

One of two Philadelphia school district representatives under Manny, who work alongside Janine. He is briefly set up with Erika, but they end up breaking up in season 4 in the episode “Karaoke”. In season 5, after being outraged on finding out that the repairman working on repairing Abbott Elementary had been shifted away to other locations, all six (Janine, Barbara, Melissa, Ava, Gregory and Jacob) approached Simon, who used his influences to make sure that Abbott students could return to their original venue.

==== Emily ====
- Portrayed by Kimia Behpoornia

One of two Philadelphia school district representatives under Manny, who work alongside Janine, and is also openly gay.

==== Rosalyn Inez ====
- Portrayed by Cree Summer

Rosalyn Inez is a librarian hired by the district for Abbott, being the first school to take part in a library program organized by Janine. Barbara is at first resistant to Inez and the program as a whole, but ultimately comes around to it after seeing how devoted Janine is to the program.

==== John Reynolds ====
- Portrayed by Keegan-Michael Key

John Reynolds is the district's new superintendent who approves of Janine's library program in "Panel", and later appears in subsequent episodes. Throughout the season he is adamant about the district spending as little money as possible, and when he offers Janine a full-time job, she rejects it, wanting to return to teaching instead of helping every school in the district.

==== Warren ====
- Portrayed by Ben Onyx Dowdy

Warren is a recurring character throughout Janine's stint at the district, working for Human Resources. He is often openly expressive about how much he dislikes Janine, and is not affected when she leaves. Additionally, he was not given a name until the fourth season premiere.

==== Crystal Riley ====
- Portrayed by Tatyana Ali

Crystal Riley is a former sorority sister of Ava who becomes the principal of another school in Philadelphia. Her school often comes into clash with the teachers of Abbott, specifically with Ava. She and Ava maintain an intense rivalry, with Ava stating that she pursued the job of principal simply to spite Crystal (who had acquired her job earlier), who appears to be far more competent and experienced in her job. Crystal disdainfully rejected Ava's offer to share the material necessities between their schools, bluntly stating that she does not wants to survive on Ava's scraps. Crystal discovers the blackmailing of the PGA lawyer and reports it to the authorities, which causes Ava to be sacked. But in 'Rally', she comes out in open support of Ava and her support turns to be vital in Ava's reinstatement.

==== Dia ====
- Portrayed by Pam Trotter

Dia is an administrative worker at the school who acts as the principal's secretary. She is shown to be emotionally cold and no-nonsense character, having to endure Ava's shenanigans daily. In season 5, when the school had to be shifted to an abandoned shopping mall, Dia temporarily goes on leave after Ava compares her to an elf. She returns when the school moves back to its original premises. Ava initially tries to appear unperturbed by Dia's absence, but when she gifted her a manatee souvenir (which she acquired while snorkeling at Crystal River), Ava breaks down into tears. In 'April Fools', she teams up with the students to organize an onslaught of pranks; not only out of her own love for the tradition, but as revenge for the others habitually forgetting her birthday, which falls on the same date.

=== Introduced in season 4 ===
==== O'Shon ====
- Portrayed by Matthew Law

O'Shon is an IT representative from the district who goes behind the district's back to protect Abbott after they begin taking unauthorized equipment from the nearby golf course construction crew. He forms a connection with Ava, one that is at first one-sided. They begin dating in the episode "Karaoke", and enter an official relationship during the fourth season finale.

==== Thomas and Rick ====
- Portrayed by Jim Rash and Wayne Wilderson

Thomas and Rick are both auditors from the district. Initially, they are sent to Abbott during "Audit" to audit the school after reports of stolen equipment from the nearby golf course. Both characters return later in the season in an attempt to keep Ava from returning to her position as principal.

=== Introduced in season 5 ===
==== Dominic Clark ====
- Portrayed by Luke Tennie

Dominic Clark is a fourth-grade teacher at Abbott. Introduced in the fifth season, Dominic is a former student of Barbara, having been in her kindergarten class twenty-years prior. Initially, Barbara welcomes him with open arms, however he finds true help and assistance from Janine.

==== Craig ====
- Portrayed by Mikey Day

Craig is an employee of the district sent to Abbott to help them complete team building activities, those being disguised punishments for Abbott taking bribes from the golf course. Craig is very confident and loving of his job.

==== Derek Collins ====
- Portrayed by Geoffrey Owens

Derek Collins is the superintendent of the Philadelphia school district and John Reynolds’ replacement.

=== Introduced in season 6 ===
==== Elsa Hardaway ====
- Portrayed by Katy Mixon Greer

Elsa Hardaway is a new second-grade teacher hired at Abbott after her previous school was shutdown in "Miami". Else takes over Melissa’s first-floor classroom, but later relocates to the second-floor after developing a crush on Mr. Morton.

== Friends and family of staff ==
=== Introduced in season 1 ===
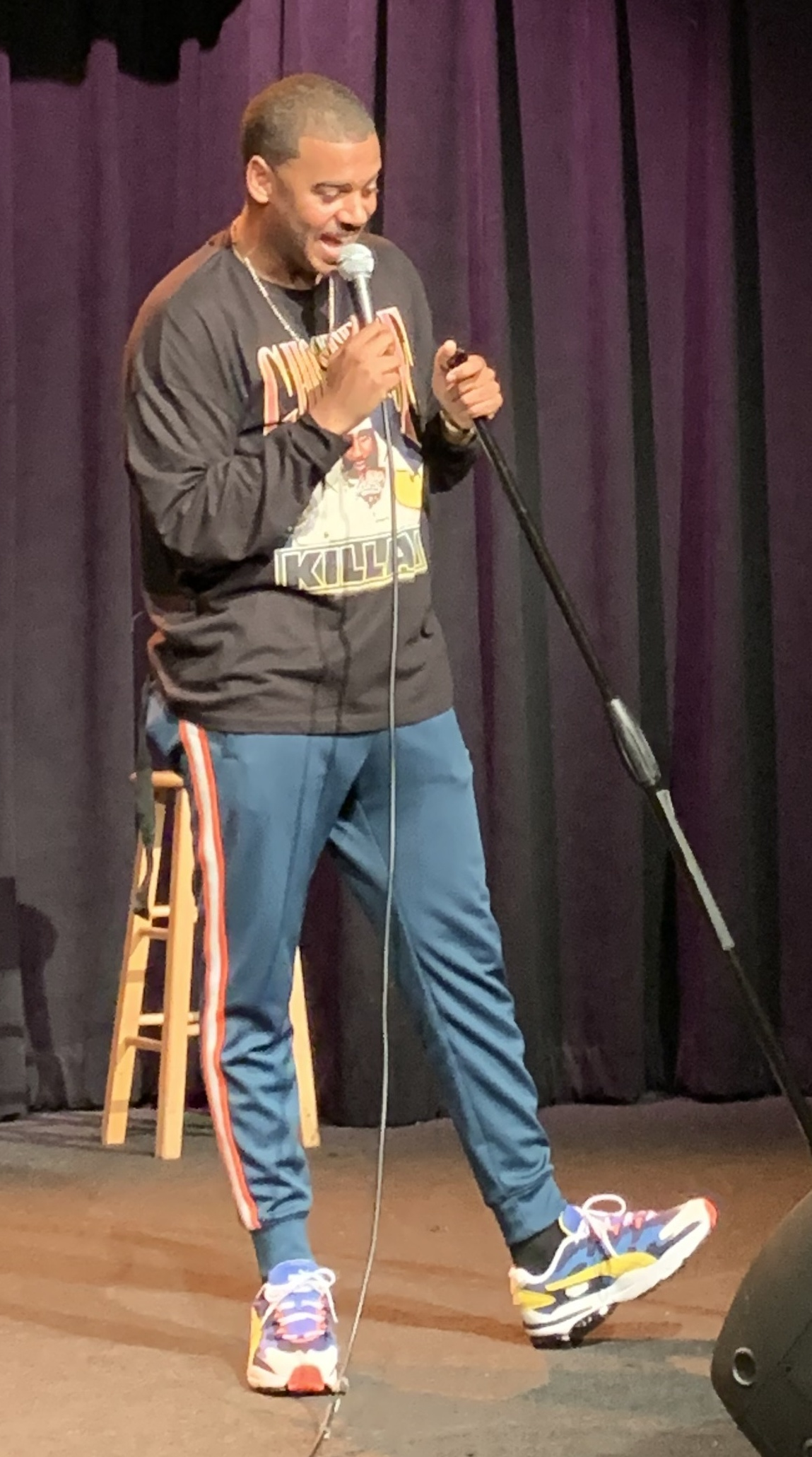
Zack Fox (pictured) portrays Tariq Temple during every season of Abbott Elementary.

==== Tariq Temple ====
- Portrayed by Zack Fox

Tariq Temple is Janine's insensitive but well-meaning ex-boyfriend, who is an aspiring rapper and self-proclaimed feminist. Throughout the first season, his career and gigs as a rapper take priority over the simple things Janine wants him to do for their relationship. He gets a call from New York during "Zoo Balloon", where he is given an opportunity of more gigs. He assumes they'd pursue a long-distance relationship, but Janine decides it is time for them to go their separate ways. He returns in "Attack Ad" to gather the things he left at Janine's apartment. He asks Janine out to dinner at Bahama Breeze, and she accepts. Later however, she ultimately does not go. He is briefly hired by Legendary Charters during the second season, but is eventually fired following a lawsuit since the jingle he made for Legendary sounded too similar to "California Love". He returns to Philadelphia at the end of the second season, and in the third season, becomes stepfather to one of Barbara's students, eventually being elected the president of the Parent Teacher Association, in which capacity he also becomes sort of a leader of the local Black community. Tariq's leadership skills becomes apparent when he unites the previously unwilling parents against Draemond's plans to convert Abbott into a charter school and when he rallies up the PTA in support of Ava in "Rally". In season 5, Tariq and Janine regularly have awkward interactions, due to the fact that Tariq's stepson is now a student in Janine's second grade class, which in turn situated beside Gregory's classroom, who also feels visibly awkward at Tariq's regular presence. Ava describes the situation as a love triangle between Tariq, Janine and Gregory.

==== Amber ====
- Portrayed by Naté Jones

Amber is the parent of a student at Abbott. In the first season, Amber brings her son Joel into Gregory's class late, unknowingly preventing him from accomplishing the proper amount of learning. Her son is moved to Janine's class in the second season, where she attempts to ask Gregory out by giving him her phone number through Janine. She and Gregory begin dating afterwards, much to Janine's jealousy. However their relationship ends towards the end of the season, after both realize they are polar opposites.

==== Gary ====
- Portrayed by Bruno Amato

Gary is a charming vending machine stocker who later becomes Melissa's affectionate boyfriend. Despite their love for each other, both decide to breakup during the season 3 premiere after Gary insists on a marriage Melissa does not want.

==== Taylor Howard ====
- Portrayed by Iyana Halley

Taylor Howard is Barbara's daughter who begins dating Gregory after visiting the school for open house. She works for an alcohol-adjacent company, which Barbara disapproves of, instead wanting her to be a teacher, much like Janine. She accompanies the school during their field trip to the zoo. In the second season, while unseen, Taylor breaks up with Gregory for being a "broke boi". Later Taylor gets married, becomes pregnant and gives birth to a daughter in season 5, who is entrusted to the care of Barbara.

==== Martin Eddie ====
- Portrayed by Orlando Jones

Martin Eddie is Gregory's unsupportive father who wants him to do more with his life than just be a school teacher. He is a retired Military Lieutenant Colonel and owns a landscaping business, which he attempts to force Gregory into. He appears physically during the first season and makes an appearance via a video call during "Fight".

Jones was cast as Gregory's father after online Twitter users pointed out that Jones and Williams look exactly alike.

==== Zach ====
- Portrayed by Larry Owens

Zach is Jacob's boyfriend who helps the school, and accompanies them on their field trip to the zoo, by serving as a chaperone. He returns during the second season cameoing in "Holiday Hookah", where he volunteers as a music teacher for the school. He returns later in the season, becoming a recurring character.

In season 3, Zach and Jacob break up. However, Zach and Jacob have a run-in in season 4 in the episode “Karaoke”.

=== Introduced in season 2 ===
==== Kristen Marie Schemmenti ====
- Portrayed by Lauren Weedman

Kristin Marie Schemmenti is Melissa's sister who works at Addington Elementary, a rival charter school. First seen in the second-season episode "Delivery Day", Kristin Marie is shamed by Melissa while visiting Addington, leading to Janine to discover that her and Melissa are sisters. In "The Principals Office", Janine attempts to rekindle her relationship with Melissa, but fails. She returns later in the season, where she and Melissa begin to rekindle their relationship; telling Melissa about Draemond's plan to turn Abbott into a charter school.

==== Erika ====
- Portrayed by Courtney Taylor

Erika is a friend of Janine from her relationship with Tariq, and is the aunt of a student in Janine's class. She later becomes Janine's best-friend and invites her to parties in hopes of improving her social mobility, while also being aware of Janine and Gregory's will-they won't-they relationship. She also has an on-and-off again relationship with Simon.

==== Krystal ====
- Portrayed by Raven Goodwin

Krystal is the mother of a student who studies at Barbara's class. While not a staff member of Abbott, she leads the PTA alongside Tariq and makes frequent appearances at the school. When first introduced, Barbara gets judgmental about Krystal for her choice of having cuss words tattooed upon her body and wearing clothing embroidered with cuss words, her application of body piercings and her profession of selling lingerie online, thereby recommending her to a support group for single mothers, to which Krystal reveals that she is already married and is deeply conservative. Krystal prohibits the Abbott Elementary staff from reading out a fairytale book of magic and demands the book in question be banned from the school library due to her Christian beliefs, placing her at conflict with Tariq.

==== Maurice ====
- Portrayed by Vince Staples

Maurice is charming and a close friend of Gregory who takes a liking to Janine. He first appears during "Holiday Hookah", where he visits a hookah bar with Gregory; and later appears during "The Fundraiser", where he asks Janine out on a date, to which she accepts. They begin dating following this, much to the unspoken jealousy of Gregory. Following Janine and Gregory kissing at a teacher conference, they both decide to tell Maurice the truth, to which he takes well. However, when Janine breaks up with him, he pushes both of them away. He is nicknamed "Mo" by the staff of Abbott.

==== Captain Robinson ====
- Portrayed by Mike O'Malley

Captain Robinson is the captain of the local Philadelphia fire station who first visits Abbott after Barbara accidentally starts a fire in the teachers lounge. Robinson appears again in the third season as a romantic interest to Melissa.

==== Ayesha Teagues ====
- Portrayed by Ayo Edebiri

Ayesha is Janine's distant sister who she has a struggle with getting to visit her. She is first mentioned during "Principal's Office" when Janine expresses her relationship with Ayesha to Melissa in an attempt to rekindle her relationship with her sister, and later during "Fight" where Janine calls Ayesha asking her to visit. Ayesha is considered to be less talented compared to Janine, a University of Pennsylvania alumna, which results in sibling rivalry between them. She ultimately appears in a FaceTime call during "Valentine's Day", when Janine calls Ayesha for her birthday with the company of Jacob.

==== Vanetta Teagues ====
- Portrayed by Taraji P. Henson

Vanetta Teagues is Ayesha and Janine's troubled mother who treats herself before them. She is regularly mentioned by Janine during many episodes, but appears in the penultimate episode of season 2, subtly asking Janine for money when her phone is turned off. Janine's mother is shown to be somewhat callous and manipulative in her attitude towards her daughter, which brings her into conflict with her Barbara.

Vanetta appears in season 5 to celebrate Janine's thirtieth birthday, where Janine tries to introduce Gregory to her, but she plainly ignores him & tries to dissuade Janine's dreams of marrying Gregory, based on her own experiences as a single mother, which visibly angers Janine. Throughout the show, it is indicated that Janine has a strained relationship with her mother, so she looks up to Barbara as a mother figure.

=== Introduced in season 3 ===
==== Avi ====
- Portrayed by Karan Soni

Avi is an EMT who works alongside Captain Robinson and later begins hanging out with Jacob, however, they are not romantically involved. He introduces his friend Olivia to Gregory during a double date, however Gregory's attraction to Janine causes the duo to not work out.

==== Olivia ====
- Portrayed by Lana Condor

Olivia is an EMT and a coworker of Avi who is invited on a double date with him, Jacob and Gregory. However, the sudden appearance of Janine and Manny at the bar the group attends to, causes friction in the date.

=== Introduced in season 4 ===
==== Miles Nathaniel ====
- Portrayed by Matt Oberg

Miles Nathaniel is a PGA lawyer involved with the construction of a new golf course near Abbott. He is blackmailed by Abbott staff when they learn that he is covering up the fact that PGA is employing non-unionized workers in the course's construction. The course itself was a cause of concern for the local Black community, as it was seen as a drive towards gentrification. After this, Abbott staff continue to find ways to blackmail Nathaniel in order to subsidize expenses like school supplies, with him eventually coming back and using them for clout. He has a particular habit of referring to himself as a white savior while interacting with Abbott staff.

==== Caleb Hill ====
- Portrayed by Tyler Perez

Caleb Hill is Jacob's little brother who lives with their parents in the early seasons. Jacob is estranged from his brother and hasn't seen him in years until Caleb comes to visit for Christmas. He is the polar opposite of Jacob, being athletic and goofy, and is soon popular with the teachers in Abbott, much to Jacob's envy, who had to separate himself from his family due to his homosexuality. In season 5, Caleb is appointed as the gym trainer in Abbott and moves in with Jacob and Melissa.

==== Frank Coleman ====
- Portrayed by Keith David

Frank Coleman is Ava's father who works as a barber in Philadelphia. He is introduced when he happens to cut Gregory's hair, and is brought onto the science fair as a sponsor, hoping to get close to Ava. Ava says that she was estranged from her father due to him divorcing her mother in order to marry a waitress. In "Rally", he assembles local business owners in a show of support for Ava before the officials.

==== Elijah ====
- Portrayed by Jaboukie Young-White

Elijah is a guy Jacob flirts with at a karaoke bar. He later becomes Jacob's love interest.

== Students and other minor characters ==
=== Courtney Pierce ===
- Portrayed by Lela Hoffmeister

Courtney is formerly a student of Melissa who is troublesome for Janine when transferred to her class. After discussion, Melissa and Janine realize that Courtney is not challenged as much as she should be. She later returns in the second season, aiding Ava during her Shark Tank-style debate for the school's grant money. In season 5, she is part of Melissa's sixth grade class.

=== Will ===
- Portrayed by Levi Mynatt

William "Will" is a student of Abbott who is primarily known amongst other students for his dancing. In the episode "New Tech", Ava asks Will, the lowest-performing student in his class, to read Becoming at a school assembly, unaware that his teacher Barbara has cheated a new reading system. Will tries his hardest but Barbara still comes clean about cheating. Will appears in various other episodes as a background character.

=== Clarence ===
- Portrayed by Zakai Biagas Bey

Clarence is a student of Jacob who regularly calls him "Mr. C". In "Read-A-Thon", Clarence becomes a member of the podcasting club started by Jacob and Gregory; but ultimately leaves after Jacob refuses to take him and the other member seriously. He rejoins, and interviews Janine about her night with Gregory at the hookah club.

=== Alex Perkins ===
- Portrayed by Mason Renfro

Alex Perkins is a student in Janine's classroom who, for a brief period, misses school on a daily basis while she is away working at the district. Janine and Gregory work together to visit Alex at home and convince him to return to school. Alex later appears in subsequent episodes during the season, with a recurring joke of him saying he may or may-not return to school.

=== Other characters ===
Appearing in the second season:

- Andre Iguodala as himself; a professional basketball player who Ava is dating. However, their relationship doesn't last long.
- Shalita Grant as Miss Janet, a counselor sent to Abbott following Barbara's accidental fire.
- Shwayze as Gabe, a representative of the Philadelphia mural arts who visits Abbott after being invited by Jacob.
- Darryl Lee-Canyon as Darrell, a teacher at Abbott. Lee-Canyon appears in multiple episodes since the second, third and fourth seasons in a non-speaking role.
- June Diane Raphael as Elizabeth Washington, Chief Education Officer of the Philadelphia Board of Education who visits Abbott to document an award ceremony. Raphael also guest-stars in the third and fourth seasons.
- Gritty as himself, Philadelphia Flyers mascot.

Appearing in the third season:

- Sabrina Brier as Jessca, a substitute teacher for Janine's classroom.
- Casey Frey as Timothy, a F.A.D.E. representative who aspires to be like Tariq.
- Aparna Nancherla as Caroline, an unhelpful F.A.D.E. representative who follows Timothy.
- Sabrina Wu as Mx. Geoffrey, a substitute for Janine who she and Melissa believe is lying about their qualifications.
- Shea Couleé as Lisa Condo, a drag artist friend of Ava's performing at Mother's Day brunch.

Appearing in the fourth season:

- Charlie Day as Charlie Kelly, a co-owner and janitor of Paddy's Pub in South Philadelphia assigned to community service at Abbott. He assists Jacob on the school's many maintenance problems and Melissa and Barbara help him to read.
- Glenn Howerton as Dennis Reynolds, a co-owner and bartender at Paddy's Pub assigned to community service at Abbott. He is skeptical of the cameras filming at Abbott and makes himself scarce as a result.
- Rob McElhenney as Ronald "Mac" McDonald, a co-owner and bouncer at Paddy's Pub assigned to community service at Abbott. He ends up running personal tasks for Ava.
- Kaitlin Olson as Deandra "Sweet Dee" Reynolds, a bartender at Paddy's Pub assigned to community service at Abbott. She connects with Janine over their experience at Penn, and flirts shamelessly with Gregory, much to Janine's annoyance.
- Danny DeVito as Frank Reynolds, the owner of Paddy's Pub assigned to community service at Abbott. He clashes with Mr. Johnson and Gregory on tending the school's community garden.
