= Touched by an Angel season 9 =

Touched by an Angel
- Season 9
- Starring: Roma Downey; Della Reese; John Dye; Valerie Bertinelli
- No. of episodes: 22

Release
- Original network: CBS
- Original release: September 28, 2002 – April 27, 2003

Season chronology
- ← Previous; Season 8

The ninth and final season of the American dramatic television series Touched by an Angel aired on CBS from September 28, 2002 through April 27, 2003, spanning 22 episodes. Created by John Masius and produced by Martha Williamson, the series chronicled the cases of two angels, Monica (Roma Downey) and her supervisor Tess (Della Reese), who bring messages from God to various people to help them as they reach a crossroads in their lives. They are frequently joined by Andrew (John Dye), the Angel of Death, and new trainee Gloria (Valerie Bertinelli). As the series drew to an end, Monica, now an experienced case worker, must pass a final test before she can be promoted to supervisor. (“I Will Walk with You”, Part 1 & 2)

The episodes use the song "Walk with You", performed by Reese, as their opening theme.

== Ratings ==
The finale placed first on both nights. The first part was watched by 8.6 million viewers, and the second part was watched by 12.9 million viewers, placing first in its timeslot and night. The two parts combined averaged 10.75 million viewers.

== Episodes ==
No. overall	No. in season	Title	Directed by	Written by	Original release date	Prod. code	Viewers (millions)
190	1	"A Rock and a Hard Place"	Kevin Dowling	Martha Williamson and Burt Pearl	September 28, 2002	901	7.18
A father in danger of his marriage collapsing and his troubled teenage son try to bond on a mountain fishing trip, where the angels have set up a lodge retreat whose other guest is an elderly woman motorcyclist hoping to rejoin her husband in heaven---all when facing a potential dangerous meteor collision with Earth, during which the father's passion for and deep knowledge of astronomy, which his family forced him to abandon as a study in favor of more "practical" work helps them come to terms. Guest stars: Taylor Handley, Mary Margaret Humes, Robert Pastorelli, Amelia Praggastis and Lois Smith
191	2	"The Sixteenth Minute"	Jim Charleston	John Wierick	October 5, 2002	904	7.47
Underpaid, unappreciated accountant Ed Gold saves the life of Marla, a ballerina who went into an abandoned, collapsing mine trying to get her dog out and became trapped inside, until rescuers can bring her out alive. Ed calls to God because the beam is so heavy and Andrew helps him hold the beam. Andrew and Marla tell Ed to turn around to look at Andrew because he's an angel so he can believe but he refuses saying the mine will collapse if he does. All of the reporters and his co-workers say he's a hero but it would've been physically impossible since Ed was holding the beam for 5+ hours. Ed is so busy basking in his newfound fame and glory that he ignores Marla---who lost her leg and her career because of the mine accident---neglects his colleagues and alienates his once-loving wife, until Monica can show him how fickle fame and glory truly are. Guest stars: Scott Christopher, Angella Joy, Rachel Luttrell, Sam McMurray, Romy Rosemont and Grant Shaud
192	3	"Two Sides to Every Angel"	Larry Peerce	Story by : Roma Downey, Brian Bird and R.J. Colleary; Teleplay by : Brian Bird and R.J. Colleary	October 12, 2002	903	7.90
Tess, Monica, and Gloria are on their day off. However, Andrew did not get today off. A man has beaten a woman nearly to death which makes her forget her name and life, and the only thing she remembers is his red cowboy boots. Gloria and Monica go to a cafe where a couple, Brad and Christie, leave. Monica is called away and tells Gloria to wait for her, but Monique (Note: From the season 5 episode "The Man Upstairs" (1999)) deceives Gloria and allows her to drive Tess' car. They go to a bar-The Black Boot. At the cafe, Tess tells Monica that unless God intervenes, they can't do anything. Monique breaks up the married couple using jealousy; through her trickery, Doug leaves with his ex-girlfriend Ashley while Christie leaves with the man in red boots. Gloria believes she failed and that God doesn't love her anymore. Monica asks God to tell her where Gloria is; Doug arrives and mentions the man in red boots and that he and Ashley just came from The Black Boot. When Monica arrives at the bar, Monique tries to trick Gloria but she asks for help, and they leave. Meanwhile, Christie escapes from the man with the red boots. When the man chases her, Gloria appears and tells him to let her go. He runs away but Andrew stops him. Gloria gives the reunited couple a message from God. Then they all return to the cafe where Ashley is told to leave, and she leaves in a taxi cab. Guest stars: Nancy Linehan Charles, Ryan Hurst, Christine Lakin and Sarah Thompson
193	4	"The Word"	Stuart Margolin	Ken LaZebnik	October 19, 2002	902	8.13
A girl with OCD (Obsessive-Compulsive Disorder) is threatened to be placed in foster care after her illiterate father gives her an overdose of her medication when he can't read the directions and dosage on the label. Guest stars: Richard J. Clifford, America Ferrera, Frank Gerrish, J.J. Neward, Dempsey Pappion and Nicholas Turturro
194	5	"A Feather on the Breath of God"	Victor Lobl	Glenn Berenbeim	October 26, 2002	906	7.59
Sidney Alcott is a funeral director whose wife and daughter have died and people's feelings do not mean very much to him -- just dollars and making money. He believes he has found the secret to success: do not get involved and find solace in drinking. Unknown to him he meets his dying daughter, Lorena Watkins, who has a brain tumour. Her daughter Grace does not know her mother is dying. Lorena has to arrange for a funeral for herself and needs to pay the hospital bills so she starts playing the organ and cleaning up around the funeral home. It isn't until it is too late and she collapses that he realizes that Lorena is Rose, his daughter. Monica reveals to Sidney about how Rose was adopted and Andrew tells him that she is in the prep room. Sidney is told by Andrew there is still a way to know Rose: through Grace. Tess conducts the funeral and sings "In the Garden" with Lorena also singing. Monica also speaks to Sidney about knowing God. He asks Grace about adopting her and hints to the fact that she needs someone who can dance. As he stops to pick up a rose he says "Hey! I dance". Guest stars: Stacy Edwards, Bob Gunton and Sarah Hyland
195	6	"Jump!"	John Dye	Brian Bird	November 2, 2002	908	8.61
Monica becomes a radio assistant to a crude shock jock whose callers include a teenage boy on the verge of suicide over his best friend's suicide. After the shock jock loses a bid to share custody of his children with his former wife, the boy's desperation and Monica's intercession help him reassess his life and his career---and help him help the boy stay alive. Guest stars: Daniel Baldwin, Dan Byrd, Angela Oh, Holmes Osborne and Reno Wilson Note: This was the only episode that John Dye has ever directed from the series.
196	7	"Bring On the Rain"	Armand Mastroianni	R.J. Colleary and Burt Pearl	November 9, 2002	909	8.49
Ben and Natalie are teenagers in love. Natalie's mother Annie works as a waitress in a diner and lives in a caravan park, but Natalie pretends to be wealthy so she can mix with rich people and get into a good school. She keeps telling her boyfriend and other friends that her mother is in Paris. Annie takes on another job selling Cosmetics but fails to sell anything. When Annie accidentally runs into Natalie, her boyfriend and his mother, she is forced to say nothing and Natalie accepts a lift from Ben and his mother. When they go to the Ivy Club, Howard tells his wife that Annie is a waitress. And Ben's mother says to him that She lied to him and Ben answers saying, "So did I. I told her you were a nice person". Monica speaks to Annie about telling the truth, Andrew speaks to Natalie about her mother. Annie and Natalie later talk to Mr. Stowe from Yale who tells them that without mistakes they'd be out of business. Natalie is accepted into Yale. Guest stars: Billy Aaron Brown, Ashley Johnson, Star Lapoint, Jo Dee Messina and Tom Schanley Note: Della Reese does not appear in this episode.
197	8	"Remembering Me: Part 1"	Bethany Rooney	Burt Pearl	November 16, 2002	905	8.02
Monica tries to carry on while Tess is placed in a nursing home with Alzheimer's disease progressively getting worse and worse. David Satterfield is a workaholic with a wife and daughter. At the same time, Monica tries to convince workaholic David Satterfield to spend time with his daughter, Carrie. Unable to do her job properly, Monica lets Sam and Rafael take over while Tess forgets Monica entirely, leading Sam to help Monica understand David's true dilemma---his mother is also an Alzheimer's victim, living in the same home as Tess and as the father of Carlos, a maintenance man in David's building who needs Rafael's assurance that he's been a good son to his stricken father. David finally visits his mother and introduces her to her granddaughter. Guest stars: Charles Shaughnessy, Sal Lopez, Kenneth Tigar, Sam Vlahos, Alexis Cruz and Paul Winfield Note: Valerie Bertinelli does not appear in this episode.
198	9	"Remembering Me: Part 2"	Armand Mastroianni	Luke Schelhaas	November 23, 2002	907	8.80
Andrew sees Kevin Greely and his adopted son Nathan in Joseph Wells. However, a man is watching them and taking notes. Later, Kevin's custody of Nathan is contested in court. Monica recalls her assignment with Kevin. (Note: As depicted in the season 3 episode "Inherit the Wind" (1997)) Then Gabriel turns up, telling Monica he is her new supervisor and to go to Joseph Wells. The Angel of Music, Jacob comes to play for Tess. The woman claiming to be Nathan's mother is Hannah from the nursing home. Kevin is furious, refusing to give up custody of Nathan. Monica reminds him of his meeting with Phil. Guest stars: Charlie Schlatter, Jenica Bergere, Nathan Norton, Ossie Davis and Keb' Mo'
199	10	"The Christmas Watch"	Peter H. Hunt	Ken LaZebnik	December 21, 2002	910	6.95
The angels help a World Trade Center family adjust to their loss. It's Christmas Eve and Piltdown and Sons who Tess comments have been there since her friend Millard Fillmore bought his watch there, after Gloria does the books finds they're bankrupt and have to close but Andrew brings a watch in purchased from the shop which was irreversibly damaged at ground zero on September 11 at the World Trade Center and cannot be repaired. However the staff are inspired to construct a brand new watch from scratch. Guest stars: Austin Pendleton, Matt Malloy, Eddie Mills, Christie Lynn Smith, Jodi Thelen, and Jose Zuniga
200	11	"Private Eyes"	Julia Rask	R.J. Colleary and Ken LaZebnik	January 11, 2003	911	7.62
Posing as a rich client, Monica asks private investigator Maurie---a former police detective forced to retire thanks to his corrupt partner---to find a Jim Grant, while Andrew rescues Maurie from a beating by a pimp trying to reclaim Delphina, an aspiring model Maurie looks after since she told him her father abused her. After deciding to give up their business scamming men of money, Maurie poses as a gas company inspector and finds Jim Grant---and is stunned to realise this normal, gentle man is Delphina's heartbroken father. Maurie eventually confesses to Delphina that he couldn't bear to lose her because helping her was one of the few lights in his post-police life. The angels and Maurie reunite her with her father. Guest stars: Scott Anderson, Kelly Connell, William Stanford Davis, Stacy Keach and Amanda MacDonald Note: Valerie Bertinelli does not appear in this episode.
201	12	"The Root of All Evil"	Michael Schultz	R.J. Colleary	January 25, 2003	914	7.62
In a church confessional, someone confesses that they are going to do something terrible. Adam is working with a cop, Micheal Riley, posing as a robber. Andrew is in an armoured truck talking to one of the bank robbers, Peter who is Micheal's brother. Gloria speaks to Father Madden about things that are on his mind. As she does, she recalls past assignments and achievements and what has happened from them. As Father Madden leaves, he recognizes one of his parishioners. Then a stand off begins. Gloria asks what do we do now and Tess says we pray. Father Madden then has a heart attack. Father Madden, dying, then begins to talk to both of them as they call 911 and he dies. Guest stars: Kirk Baltz, Charles Durning, Charles Rocket and Matt Ross Note(s): Roma Downey does not appear in this episode. This is the first episode ever in which she does not appear. She does however, appear in flashbacks of previous episodes.
202	13	"A Time for Every Purpose"	John Behring	Story by : E.F. Wallengren and John Wierick; Teleplay by : John Wierick	February 1, 2003	916	7.19
Rob is terminally ill and when tragedy hits the family again he decides to take his own life rather than be a hindrance. Rob's estranged brother returns to help out the family. Guest stars: Seth Adkins, Timothy Carhart, Reb Fleming, Deirdre Lovejoy and William R. Moses
203	14	"And a Nightingale Sang"	Peter H. Hunt	Story by : Jennifer Wharton; Teleplay by : Burt Pearl and Ken LaZebnik	February 8, 2003	912	7.81
On Valentine's day during a winter's day in The Ritz restaurant, Monica says a couple are going to fall in love-The cook, Marty and owner-wife Tricia who have been married for 10 years argue about the weather and money. Riley wants to marry his fiance Amanda and has a ring put in the salad but they argue because she writes everything down and wants to break up with him. Charlotte has a facial disfigurement and has met Ben through a chat room and finds he is the one that rescued her out of the accident she was in. An elderly couple, George and Loretta arrive and Andrew tells them one of them is going to die tonight. It is their anniversary and they have been married for 49 years. Tricia tells Marty she's pregnant, causing Marty to nearly choke to death on some food but is OK. All of the couples end their dinners in happiness and joy. Guest stars: Bonnie Bartlett, William Daniels, Kate Fuglei, Tembi Locke, Lennie Loftin, Louis Mandylor, Wendie Jo Sperber and Cress Williams
204	15	"As It Is in Heaven"	Victor Lobl	Martha Williamson and Luke Schelhaas	February 15, 2003	915	8.40
Monica goes to driving school and encounters a corrupt teacher who is accepting bribes. When Monica confronts the teacher, it turns out that she is actually an angel who has spent many years raising an orphan in order to save him from gang violence. Guest stars: Edwin Hodge, Robert LaSardo and Lesley Ann Warren
205	16	"Song for My Father"	Ricardo Mendez Matta	Brian Bird	February 22, 2003	913	8.56
Sarah, a 17-year-old teenage High School student who sings in a choir, smokes cigarettes, and has lead vocals in a rock band is in need of the angels when she discovers that she has throat cancer. She is advised by Gloria not to sing and that the vocal cords may have to be removed. To complicate matters, her father is the music school teacher and doesn't want her playing her rock music. When Monica comes to her home to have her sign a scholarship, it is discovered she has left through the window to sing in the concert. Sarah ignores Gloria's advice and sings during the concert but collapses during the performance. After she is taken to hospital, Richard and Paula, Sarah's parents argue about the cigarettes and the fact that it is her fault. When Paula asks God for help, Andrew appears and tells her she must mean it. Monica then speaks to Richard about his attitude towards his daughter and reveals herself as an angel of God. Tess, also revealing herself as an angel, speaks to Sarah about making music and that God is going to give her a brand new song. Guest stars: Ann Dowd, Tyler Francavilla, Krystal, Geoff Pierson and Lindsay Pulsipher
206	17	"The Good Earth"	Ben Lewin	Luke Schelhaas	March 1, 2003	917	7.74
Emmett Rivers is an eccentric inventor who is too proud to ask for help and is working on a converter to energy. Monica meets him working as an IRS worker. Stan is a newspaper delivery boy who meets Emmett by breaking into his home. Carl Northam is the Manager of an oil company who has the power to change from oil to Emmett's converter. Gloria is one of his board members. But Emmett is dying and hasn't got long to live. He has cancer and has decided to discontinue treatment. Pretending that his company wants his invention, Carl buys it from him for $500,000 but ends up destroying it and almost all the documents about it. However Stan, is the one to start rebuilding it again. Monica tells Emmett that there is time to show Stan what he needs to know. Guest stars: Joel Bishop, Eric Jacobs, Jonathan Lipnicki, Michael Nouri and Dennis Weaver Note: Della Reese does not appear in this episode.
207	18	"Virtual Reality"	Larry Peerce	Story by : Daniel H. Forer; Teleplay by : Burt Pearl and Daniel H. Forer	March 15, 2003	918	6.61
Lying in a hospital bed is a young woman, Marissa Atkins, whom Victor Jackson ran over on purpose. Victor is on trial for murder and Joshua Walker is a material witness after playing CarJack2000 in his parents' car. Tess is the Judge, Andrew is the Defence Lawyer, and Rafael is the Prosecution Lawyer. Monica has been given the gift of seeing into someone's heart, and questions Joshua. To Victor and Joshua's shock and surprise Marissa Atkins is wheeled in using a wheelchair immediately after Joshua perjures himself for Victor. When Monica confronts him about his perjury, she reveals herself as an angel. Joshua then breaks down and Monica advises him to tell the truth and ask God what to say. Victor is found guilty. Tess advises parents via the press to say "No". Guest stars: Austin Archer, Jim Beatty, Cliff DeYoung, Kyle Gallner, Marita Geraghty, Elizabeth Hansen, Billy Kay, Bruce Newbold, Jordan Warkol and Alexis Cruz Note: Valerie Bertinelli does not appear in this episode.
208	19	"The Show Must Not Go On"	Frank E. Johnson	Story by : R.J. Colleary; Teleplay by : Brian Bird and Ken LaZebnik	April 12, 2003	920	4.88
A group of actors are obsessed with staging a show to revive The Egyptian Theatre and teenagers hang around all day vandalizing the theatre. Tess says that if they both don't get it together the curtain will come down on both. Tess, Gloria and Andrew arrive as the video crew for the theatre's 50th anniversary. Tess reveals herself as an angel and encourages Ben. He is inspired by a new song but he has a stroke and clutches his arm in pain. Tess and Gloria then find out, from Andrew walking up to him, that Ben is dying. After Ben's death Andrew gives the teens free paint. Tess then encouages the teens to express their anger and art in the theatre. A vote is taken after Wally is added to the board and he is made the new director 4-1. Everyone wants to have their own act and people don't think he can do the job. The teens break into the theater and trash it. Discouraged, Wally gives up and knowing what is thought of him, leaves the theater when he overhears someone talking about him. Their fights and arguments against each other are interrupted by the light from the stage. Tess, Andrew and Gloria each encouraged them. Tess then sings the song that Ben was going to write before he died: "I've Been Touched by an Angel". Guest stars: Elisa Bocanegra, Gavin MacLeod, Ethan Phillips, Jake Richardson, Alex Rocco, Scott Thompson and Jessica Walter Note: Roma Downey does not appear in this episode.
209	20	"At the End of the Aisle"	Jim Charleston	Story by : Martha Williamson; Teleplay by : Burt Pearl and Luke Schelhaas	April 19, 2003	919	6.83
It is the third time the angels have visited Audrey (Note: After the season 6 episode "Mother's Day" (2000)) and Monica must tell Audrey something which will break her heart and is the most difficult thing to say. She must not marry her fiancee as she has not prayed for the marriage and asked God to be involved. However it is Gloria's assignment to get Audrey to say "I do". Audrey asks Andrew to walk her down the aisle. Tess, Andrew and Monica notice the different vows they take at the rehearsal and Gloria tells them Audrey's fiancee Scott is an atheist. When Monica challenges Audrey about God not being invited she brushes Monica aside. Andrew asks Monica who Audrey has actually fallen in love with and who does Kyle remind her of?. When Monica is asked to say a few words, she recounts Audrey's song "Testify to Love" (Note: As depicted in the season 5 episode "Psalm 151" (1998)) and asks her to sing it, but Audrey stops and can't finish it. Cornelia, who used to call herself Celine, has to give a letter from Petey to Audrey. Monica speaks to Audrey about her responsibility, about being unequally yoked and that marrying Scott is replacing Petey. Audrey tells Monica that it was a mistake, please don't come. An accidental fire is started when Kyle is lighting the candles. In the hospital, Cornelia gives Audrey a letter written by Petey before he died. Audrey accidentally says Petey instead of Kyle. Audrey weeps when she reads Petey's letter. Going back to the wedding room Audrey sets up a cross. When Scott comes, Audrey tells him about Monica, Tess and Andrew. It turns out that Audrey says "I do" not to her wedding vows but to God. Monica encourages her with the love of God and a message, asks her to invite God back into her life. Audrey sings Amazing Grace. Alex then compliments her on her singing and offers her a ride home. Guest stars: Mika Boorem, Susan Dolan, Ned Gill, Gregory Jbara, Brandon Mauro, Paul Micheal, Micheal Milhoan and Wynonna Judd
210	21	"I Will Walk with You: Part 1"	Larry Peerce	Story by : Martha Williamson; Teleplay by : Martha Williamson, Burt Pearl & Luke Schelhaas	April 26, 2003	921	8.60
It is Monica's last assignment with Tess, and this assignment is for her promotion as a supervisor. She is to go to Ascension. On the way, Monica's colleagues give their opinions about Monica. Unknown to her, the person who evaluates her is on the bus, Zac (Jesus). The Black Mercedes-Benz is the devil driving around following Monica. The first person she meets is Joey and then Wayne. Wayne is a widower/sheriff in a town where 46 children and 8 teachers have died. Monica also meets someone she met from search and rescue, Mike, who is now the mayor and a lawyer. Mr. Carver wants to call a town meeting for a proposal. Later, when she sees Sophie, Monica recalls a time when she was a street person and met her. Zac starts to tidy up the town and repair things and townspeople see things that were lying around, missing-disappear without a reason. At the Town Hall, Mr. Carver wants to buy the town and convert it into a commercial shopping complex. Mr. Carver claims that Zac has been in the town before when he made his assessment a year before. Everyone in the town blames Zac for the deaths of the children and teachers and Zac has to be taken to Wayne's jail and put in protective custody. Guest stars: Scott Bairstow, Bob Bancroft, Ivar Brogger, Patrick Duffy, Cloris Leachman, Karina Logue, William Mapother, Patty Duke, Marion Ross, Alexis Cruz, Charles Rocket, Paul Winfield, Paul Wittenburg, Randy Travis and David Ogden Stiers as Satan
211	22	"I Will Walk with You: Part 2"	Larry Peerce	Story by : Martha Williamson; Teleplay by : Martha Williamson, Burt Pearl & Luke Schelhaas	April 27, 2003	922	12.90
The case against Zac goes to trial and Satan is the prosecutor. Mike is the defense lawyer for Zac. Gloria comes on the case as well to assist in Zac's defense. As the trial progresses, it seems that Satan is winning and Zac is losing. Satan quotes John 10:10 and implies that Zac is the devil. The Jury start their deliberations and Wayne talks to Zac and says he'll buy him lunch if he gets acquitted. Zac asks Wayne to pray when he asks him if there is anything he can do for him. Wayne plays his guitar and sings, "When Mama Prayed". Meanwhile, Mike decides it's time to open the church. Waiting for them is a big surprise. All of the missing toys and photos have been made into a memorial shrine. Zac has also carved a plaque quoting Matthew 5:4. When the Jury comes back, Zac is found guilty of 54 counts of murder. Monica speaks to Zac about God's love and encouragement. Monica says she is willing to be the angel to protect him. Tess speaks to her and says it OK with the Father. The next morning Zac is gone from the locked prison cell. At the cafe, Joey recalls how he had kittens that he kept secret from Wayne because he believed Wayne wouldn't let him keep them. The devil tricked him into turning up the heat. Then everyone realizes why Zac wouldn't defend himself. As Jesus, he quotes John 15:13 and Matthew 25:21. Andrew gives Monica his pocket watch and Tess says they have eternity to look forward to and as she says her tearful goodbyes, She drives off in Tess' Cadillac convertible. Guest stars: Scott Bairstow, Bob Bancroft, Ivar Brogger, Patrick Duffy, Karina Logue, William Mapother, Patty Duke, Marion Ross, Randy Travis, Paul Wittenburg and David Ogden Stiers as Satan Note(s): Final episode of the series. Roma Downey is the only actress to appear in almost every episode, except 2, in the final season. In second place, Della Reese had also nearly appeared in every episode of the series, except 2, in the final season, and missed 1 episode in the third season.
