= Undercard (film) =

- Theatrical release poster
- Directed by: Tamika Miller
- Written by: Tamika Miller; Anita M. Cal
- Produced by: Anne Clements; Paul Kampf; Mark Pennell
- Starring: Wanda Sykes; Bentley Green; Roselyn Sánchez; Berto Colón; Estella Kahiha; Xavier Mills; William Stanford Davis
- Cinematography: Ana M. Amortegui
- Edited by: Libya El-Amin; David Michael Maurer
- Music by: EmmoLei Sankofa
- Production company: Catalyst Studios
- Distributed by: Seismic Releasing
- Release dates: October 20, 2025 (Newport Beach Film Festival); February 27, 2026 (United States)
- Running time: 105 minutes
- Country: United States
- Language: English

Undercard is a 2025 American sports drama film directed by Tamika Miller and co-written by Anita M. Cal. It stars Wanda Sykes, Bentley Green, Roselyn Sánchez, Berto Colón, Estella Kahiha, Xavier Mills, and William Stanford Davis.

== Cast ==
- Wanda Sykes as Cheryl 'No Mercy' Stewart
- Bentley Green as Keith
- Roselyn Sánchez
- Berto Colón as Hector
- Estella Kahiha as Meka
- Xavier Mills as Kordell
- William Stanford Davis as Baba T

== Production ==
In February 2024, it was reported that a sports drama film directed by Tamika Miller and co-written by Anita M. Cal was in development titled Undercard, with Wanda Sykes cast as the lead, in her first dramatic acting role. In October 2025, Bentley Green, Roselyn Sánchez, Berto Colón, Estella Kahiha, Xavier Mills, and William Stanford Davis were revealed as part of the cast.

== Release ==
Undercard premiered at the Newport Beach Film Festival on October 20, 2025, and it was released in the United States on February 27, 2026.

== Reception ==
On review aggregator Rotten Tomatoes, 50% of 18 critics gave the film a positive review, with an average rating of 5.5/10.
