= All the Tea in China =

(Not For) All the Tea in China is an idiom for something very valuable or priceless. It may also refer to:

== Books ==
- All the Tea in China, novel by Kyril Bonfiglioli
- For All the Tea in China, novel by Sarah Rose 2009

== Film and TV ==
- "All the Tea in China" (Lucky Feller), a 1976 TV episode
- "For All the Tea in China", TV episode of Touched by an Angel 2002

== Music ==
=== Songs ===
- "All The Tea in China", song by Susan Jacks 1980
- "All the Tea in China", song by Hugh Cornwell from Wolf 1988
- "For All the Tea in China", song by Sharon O'Neill
