= Touched by an Angel season 7 =

Touched by an Angel
- Season 7
- Starring: Roma Downey; Della Reese; John Dye
- No. of episodes: 25

Release
- Original network: CBS
- Original release: October 15, 2000 – May 20, 2001

Season chronology
- ← Previous; Season 6 Next → Season 8

The seventh season of the American dramatic television series Touched by an Angel ran on CBS from October 15, 2000 through May 20, 2001, spanning 25 episodes. Created by John Masius and produced by Martha Williamson, the series chronicled the cases of two angels, Monica (Roma Downey) and her supervisor Tess (Della Reese), who bring messages from God to various people to help them as they reach a crossroads in their lives. They are frequently joined by Andrew (John Dye), the angel of death.

The episodes use the song "Walk with You", performed by Reese, as their opening theme.

== Episodes ==
No. overall	No. in season	Title	Directed by	Written by	Original release date	Prod. code	Viewers (millions)
143	1	"The Face on the Barroom Floor"	Peter H. Hunt	Teleplay by : Martha Williamson & Burt Pearl; Story by : Daniel H. Forer	October 15, 2000	704	15.09
High atop a New York penthouse, Tess is entertaining at a society party hosted by bon vivant Everett Clay when his octogenarian father Benjamin, who still runs the family business, makes a surprise appearance to chastise his son and grandson about their wasteful ways. The following morning, Benjamin tells Everett the Biblical story of the prodigal son. Benjamin reminds Everett that his grandfather started this company carving handmade buttons and he's being disinherited to learn the importance of self reliance and hard work, handing him a framed deerskin jacket, with buttons carved by his great grandfather. Angry and penniless, Everett smashes the glass in the frame, when Tess arrives in her Cadillac offering him a ride to Colorado, where some of his friends had invited him to stay. Before long, they arrive in Central City, the mining town that was in its heyday at the turn of the century. They stop at the historic Teller House Saloon where Everett notices a portrait of a woman's face painted on the barroom floor. Tess tells Everett some of the folklore surrounding the fabled portrait, then goes on to tell him its connection to his great grandfather, Jack Clay. Tess explains that he left the treasure intact, taking only his due. Realizing what this means, Everett searches the deerskin Jacket, finds the map and returns to the spot to unearth the treasure his great grandfather buried over a hundred years ago. But when he opens it he is flabbergasted to find a lone button. When Everett realizes he'd come all this way for naught he goes into cardiac arrest. He's rushed to the hospital, and while the doctors work on reviving his body, Monica works on his soul. With Monica's help Everett finally comes to understand the lesson his father had been trying to impart. When Everett regains consciousness, he calls his father to apologize and to assure him that he's coming home a changed man. Guest stars: Ray Walston and Richard Chamberlain
144	2	"Legacy"	Bethany Rooney	Jennifer Wharton	October 22, 2000	703	13.95
At Wisconsin State University, a Millionaire father, Sam Rigney, is dropping his son off at the same Fraternity House he was in. Before Tess and Andrew join Rafael, Rafael meets them and introduces himself, as a student, who notices Sam is paying for Max's education, so as long as he goes to this school. Sam will only pay for Max's education if he takes the subjects he chooses for him, and pledges for the same Fraternity he was in. When he learns Max is taking a Philosophy course without his permission, Sam tells him to stay away from Monica and Philosophy. During the last night of pledging after drinking tequila, Max's friend Greg collapses, and the president of the fraternity house urges everyone else to lie for the house. Jamie tells the president that he will tell the police that it was his alcohol thinking that it won't be a big deal. The next night during the swearing in and the presentation of pins, Jamie is arrested for distributing to a minor and Greg is in a coma. However Sam Rigney has a secret his son Max doesn't know about. When he was president, the Fraternity House kidnapped a co-ed and she pressed charges. When Sam tells Max about the secret, he tells him that the girl had volunteered but she really hadn't. The reason Sam wanted Max to stay away from Monica is because they met the night the girl was kidnapped. After Greg dies, Max tells his dad he loves him but he is going to the police and he doesn't want a father or brothers that would do such awful things like the fraternity did. Max also tells his dad that he doesn't care if he has to wash dishes to get through school because when his dad paid for his schooling it was never free and that it came with conditions. Guest stars: Jere Burns, Jacob Tierney and Alexis Cruz
145	3	"The Invitation"	Michael Schultz	Teleplay by : Jon Andersen & R.J. Colleary; Story by : Jon Andersen	October 29, 2000	705	16.23
Since it is Halloween, Tess talks to Monica about the devil and instructs her to stay with Annie, her assignment who is pregnant. Unbeknown to her, the devil has disguised himself as a 15-year-old child named Denis and befriended Annie to win her trust. Tess sings praise and worship to God. Annie tries to tell the future using tarot cards and Rick bets a cheque of $4500 on a horse which he loses when the horse comes 3rd. Andrew catches Millie in a bar toilet about to commit suicide because she thought her cancer was returning. Andrew then reveals himself. Tess and Andrew explains to Rick, Millie and Clara about Satan. When Denis tells Annie he's hungry, she goes to grab food for him. When she tries to come back to the party room, Denis transforms into a lion and causes Annie to fall down a flight of stairs, Monica, revealing herself as an angel, explains to her about the devil, that he is a liar, a deceiver a monster and a beast. Monica encourages Annie to call on God and after she falls onto unconsciousness, Monica prays. Tess also encourages Rick, Millie and Clara to pray and to put on the armour of God. As the group of friends arrive at Annie and Rick's apartment, singing, the devil then leaves. Guest stars: Karina Arroyave, Guillermo Diaz and Marla Gibbs
146	4	"Restoration"	Robert J. Visciglia, Jr.	R.J. Colleary	November 5, 2000	706	13.32
Chandler Crowne is an old, stubborn crotchy retired director who wants to die, but Andrew tells him not yet. There is a student who is making a documentary about him, who sleeps in her Volvo Station Wagon but he refuses to tell his story about his life. But Tess blackmails him into food for an interview with the student. He then goes back to the time when Monica became an actress. When he eats all the lemon bars Tess has brought for him, he decides to stop talking. After her car is towed away, she pawns his pocket watch to get her car out of impound. The next day, after he finds out she took his watch, he threatens to call the police, but she threatens to eat the pawn ticket if she doesn't get the interview. Again he flashes back to when he was a director, and then again stops and tells her to go away. Tess meets her later on in the cinema and encourages her not to give up. She gives his watch back. Flashing back for the third time, she finds out Sid Lumsky tried to take his film away. but he edited the last 5 minutes of the film. She then becomes upset with him when he finds out what happened and storms out. Monica then appears and encourages him to tell the truth and then go home. After speaking to her, in the cinema, telling her that he was mad at God for Ruby's death, and was married to her. He dies after watching the original version of "Damnation" which was supposed to be titled "Redemption". Guest star: Robert Loggia
147	5	"Finger of God"	Robert J. Visciglia, Jr.	Burt Pearl & Susan Cridland Wick	November 12, 2000	701	15.18
Tess and Monica are talking about the wind, and a Tornado storm chaser arrives home to find that his funding has been cut. Andrew meanwhile tells Monica that she has to be at Darby's field at the Elm tree with Calvin the storm chaser so he doesn't have to. After Tess speaks to Calvin and tells him not to give up and when he heads off he picks up Monica who tells him he must get to the field. The car of Laura, Joe's wife suddenly crashes front first in the middle of the street in front of Ernie the sheriff. Laura, travelling with her baby Emily is missing and Tess urges everyone to search for them. Monica and Calvin find Emily, Joe and Laura's baby. When they arrive back at JJ's the diner is destroyed. Guest stars: Joe Chrest, Kathy Mattea and Glynn Turman
148	6	"The Empty Chair"	Jeff Kanew	Martha Williamson	November 19, 2000	707	13.81
A husband and wife couple on a TV show who give advice to others about their relationships, have problems in their own marriage. Their show is cancelled and problems escalate when they are suddenly unemployed. Guest stars: George Dzundza and Tess Harper
149	7	"God Bless the Child"	Victor Lobl	Glenn Berenbeim	November 26, 2000	709	14.28
14-year-old Charnelle Bishop tells her grandmother that she's going to the museum for an essay she has to write about "finding a piece of yourself in history." But she's really going there to buy drugs from her dealer, Lamont. Monica tries to forge a bond with Charnelle through her love of music, but Charnelle is wary of Monica. Monica catches Charnelle in the bathroom lighting up a joint and refuses to give it back until she begins her homework assignment. Monica tells Charnelle the story of how Billie Holiday fought her own battle against drugs. In flashback, we return to a Greenwich Village speakeasy in 1939 where Billie Holiday is performing, with Andrew auditioning to be her pianist. But Charnelle isn't interested in hearing about love songs, she likes music that tells the truth. Monica resumes the story of how Billie Holiday reacted when she first read the lyrics to the song "Strange Fruit" -- the first song to tell the truth about lynching of African Americans. Monica persuades Charnelle to enter the exhibit of lynching photographs on display at the museum, but after viewing them, Charnelle is surprisingly unmoved. Charnelle meets with Lamont in the lobby, asking him for something stronger. Aware that Charnelle's brother died of a drug overdose, Monica asks why she hasn't learned from his death. As Monica resumes Billie's story, Andrew is eventually able to persuade Billie to sing the song, but she pleads with Andrew to get her the drugs to give her the strength. But Charnelle is impatient with Monica's story and grabs the joint out of her hands. She turns a corner and runs into a security guard, who discovers the joint and calls her grandmother to pick her up. As she waits, Monica resumes her story, with Billie in worse shape, craving drugs, when Andrew's "connection" arrives and it's Tess. But Tess isn't there to push drugs, she's there to push God. Georgia arrives at the museum security office, demanding an explanation from her granddaughter. On hearing of the lynching photographs, Georgia forces Charnelle to view them with her. Georgia asks Charnelle to describe what she sees, when to Charnelle's surprise, her grandma starts describing the scene from memory -- because the man in the photograph was her brother, Earl. Georgia explains how Earl was not only her brother, but her teacher and her best friend. He taught her to read, and when her birthday came around, he worked extra hard to buy her a gift, which his employer falsely accused him of stealing. The gift was her Bible which she is never without and became the source of her strength. Monica resumes Billie Holiday's story as she summons the courage to sing "Strange Fruit" before a live audience. After the song, there is complete silence -- until finally, the sound of one person applauding, followed by the thunderous applause of the entire audience. Monica reveals herself as an angel and urges her to learn from her brother's mistake and choose life and turn her back on drugs. Monica encourages Charnelle to hold onto her dream, and to write her essay, and tell the truth for her generation as Billie did for hers. When Lamont returns with the drugs, Charnelle takes the first step, telling him she's changed her mind. Guest stars: Mary Alice and Paula Jai Parker
150	8	"Reasonable Doubt"	Peter H. Hunt	Burt Pearl	December 3, 2000	708	16.27
Tess tells Monica that she needs to get a library card that will put her into the public system. Monica serves in a jury for a murder and believes that the accused is not guilty. During the course of the jury, she tries to show everyone how to look very carefully at the facts before making a decision. Guest stars: Bonnie Franklin, Bill Macy and Cathy Lee Crosby
151	9	"The Grudge"	Peter H. Hunt	Arnold Margolin	December 10, 2000	702	15.87
Andrew is a judge in a court where two people, physician Lucy Scribner and minister Robert Harrigan have a 40-year-old dispute. As teenagers they were in love until Robert's father refused to let him marry her because she had polio and sent him away. Monica is pulled over in Tess's car, and Tess and Monica are sentenced by Andrew to community service with them. Lucy befriends Robert's visiting young nephew Brian, disturbing Robert. Their dispute comes to a head when Brian is hit by a car and paralyzed from the neck down. Lucy, Tess and Monica try to get judge Andrew to approve an experimental drug to be used on Brian, but the petition is denied. Monica tells them there must be forgiveness before there can be healing. Robert and Lucy realise the letters he wrote her after his father sent him away went unanswered because they were undelivered---Robert's father was the mailman on their route. The experimental drug works on Brian, and Lucy and Robert marry. Guest stars: Bonnie Bartlett and Robert Prosky
152	10	"An Angel on My Tree"	Larry Peerce	Brian Bird	December 17, 2000	712	15.52
Cathy Benson is a single mom with three children. Her husband Joe is in prison for killing Matt McHale when McHale made fun of Joe's son Cody who has Tourette syndrome. Joe refuses to sign his children up for project Angel tree. As a result there are no presents for Cathy or her children on Christmas Day. However he later changes his mind but people won't buy any presents for them and his father does not fill one out for Cody. Tess tells Mrs McHale she needs to reach out in forgiveness and Andrew tells Joe that his father called him a retard and that is why he can't control his anger. Monica tells Cody about God and that He sees his heart. Cody says he wants to go to heaven because he is tired of people laughing at him. Guest stars: Christopher Marquette with music by Kenny Rogers
153	11	"Mi Familia"	Victor Lobl	Rosanne Welch	January 7, 2001	711	16.82
Miguel and Anna’s marriage is interrupted by Anna’s father, Tommy, who rejects his daughter’s decision to marry Miguel, the father of their 6-month old child. Unmoved by Anna’s protests of love, Tommy dismisses Miguel because of his gang affiliation. Tommy insists the two teenagers stay away from each other. Andrew and Rafael, working with the church, try to get Miguel to participate in a community outreach program for teenage fathers, but his participation is only to appease the suspicions of the local police. Miguel is determined to gain his respect the only way he knows how, through the gang. Gonzo, the hot-tempered leader, informs Miguel of his plans to kill a rival gang member. Miguel returns home to discover his mother, Lorena, has given away his room to Monica, who works as a church volunteer. This furthers Miguel’s withdrawal from the people who truly care about him. Lorena confides to Monica her disappointment in her son’s lifestyle and longing for the son he once was. Miguel and Anna meet the next day at the family run restaurant owned by Tommy. Tommy voices his displeasure with Miguel and his friends to an attentive new customer, Tess. Tess recognizes that Tommy’s intolerance is closely linked with his own questionable past that he is trying to escape. Gonzo pressures Miguel to kill one of their rivals after a failed earlier attempt. Miguel struggles with his decision and privately turns to God for guidance. Monica tries to convince Miguel that his family is in need of him, not the gang. Misguided by his father’s legacy, Miguel is undeterred in carrying out his orders. Miguel’s hesitation at the critical moment infuriates Gonzo, who fears their rival will retaliate. Miguel rushes home to gather his few belongings and asks Anna to leave town with him. Anna’s devotion to Miguel leads her to reluctantly follow him with their son. As they get into the car to leave, there is a drive-by shooting by the rival gang, which injures Anna and the baby. They are rushed to the hospital where Miguel is relieved to discover that the injuries are not critical. The doctor explains that his baby was fortunate to have the car seat buckle interfere with the path of the bullet. Miguel realizes what he learned in his parenting class, the proper way to buckle a baby in a car, saved his son’s life. Tommy arrives at the hospital incensed at Miguel. At Tess’ urging, Tommy dispels Miguel’s glorified memory of his father and explains to Miguel that his father killed himself playing Russian Roulette. The shocking news drives Miguel away. Miguel concludes that his entire life has been a failure. Monica tells Miguel that there are many people who love and need him, but he must take responsibility for his actions. Monica takes Miguel to church where Rafael reveals that he is an angel sent by God, just like Monica, Tess and Andrew. Rafael urges Miguel to open his heart to God because through His grace, he can live in the truth and start over again. Miguel returns to the hospital to apologize to Tommy. Miguel promises that he will be a good father and offers his cooperation with the police. Guest stars: Jesse Borrego, Renoly Santiago, Laura Cerón and Alexis Cruz
154	12	"The Lord Moves in Mysterious Ways"	Joel J. Feigenbaum	R.J. Colleary	January 21, 2001	710	12.43
Monica and Andrew are planning a surprise party for Tess to show their appreciation. A new angel, Ronald, from Records and Permanent Files, shows up at the party hoping to meet Tess. The only problem is that Tess is running late and the hotel's banquet manager, Mr. Nalls, is pressuring them to move things along for the Chamber of Commerce banquet at five. Meanwhile, Tess, who is under the impression that Monica's in trouble, is having car problems, pulls into a diner/car repair station where a none-too-helpful cashier, Kelly, tells her she'll have to wait until Penny returns from a tow call. Meanwhile, back at the banquet room, Ronald tells Monica and Andrew about how he daydreams about helping people face to face. But he doesn't feel he has what it takes to be a caseworker. Tess, meanwhile, tries to get Kelly to help her, but Kelly insists she doesn't do favors, that anytime you do things for other people, you just get in trouble. As the five o'clock hour arrives with no sign of Tess, the Chamber of Commerce banquet starts moving in. While Ronald has a pretty good idea of who Tess is, Monica and Andrew try to fill in the blanks, such as Tess's gift for music. We then see that Tess is using that very gift to get through to Kelly. Kelly finally explains how her father ran into a burning house to save a man's life and they both died. Once Tess realizes that Kelly refuses to be swayed, she offers to give Kelly her beloved Cadillac if she'll just drive her where she needs to be. Tess finally arrives. Monica and Andrew explain how they've spent the entire afternoon talking about her and how they've come to realize even more how much she means to them. They then present her with their gift -- a beautiful hood ornament for her car. Tess introduces Kelly -- when Ronald suddenly recognizes her last name. Ronald pulls Monica aside so that she can deliver God's message to Kelly. But Monica tells Ronald that this time, God is calling him to deliver the message. With a little push from Monica, Ronald reveals himself as an angel (along with Monica, Andrew and Tess). He tells Kelly that her father was a brave man and that while two people died that day, one little boy's life was saved -- the man who is being honored this evening as Man of the Year -- Brandon White. Brandon White then steps up to the podium to deliver his acceptance speech. He speaks of the perfect stranger (Kelly's father) who gave his life for his and explains how he dedicated himself to be deserving of the second chance he received. Guest stars: Mel Harris and Joel Grey
155	13	"A Death in the Family"	Stuart Margolin	Teleplay by : E.F. Wallengren; Story by : Allen Estrin & Joseph Telushkin	February 4, 2001	713	15.47
Detective Frank McCovey and his narcotics team obtain a warrant to raid the house of an elusive drug dealer based on a tip from his informant. The targeted address is an African-American neighborhood known for its criminal element. McCovey leads the raid, ignoring the signs that indicate they may be at the wrong house. McCovey charges through the apparent empty residence and mistakenly shoots an innocent eleven-year-old boy, Jamal Griffin, who is hospitalized in critical condition. Reverend Davis, hardened by the social injustices perpetrated on his community, proclaims that this one will not be ignored. Andrew, an Internal Affairs agent, suggests the truth behind the tragic event lies with the accidental death of McCovey’s ten-year-old daughter’s by a black man. McCovey refuses to discuss the matter, insisting that he followed proper procedure. Meanwhile, Jamal’s mother begins her vigil beside her unconscious son and is joined by the police department’s community relations officer, Monica. McCovey’s suspension does not appease Rev. Davis, who skillfully uses the media to further his own agenda of social unrest, under the guise of protecting the Griffins' wishes. McCovey wrestles with his own conscience as he reflects on the circumstances of the shooting. News of the drug dealer’s apprehension at a different address only pushes McCovey to blame his informant. McCovey insists he correctly wrote down the relayed information, but is unable to recover the piece of paper to aid his case. His wife and his partners try to help him realize that he may be pushing himself too hard and making mistakes, but McCovey refuses to listen or apologize. Tess, a new parishioner to Rev. Davis’ church, warns the reverend that his call to arms may incite violence against the police department. Rev. Davis refutes Tess’s claim until proven wrong when a brick, bearing the words on Rev. Davis’s flyer, is thrown through the McCovey’s window, injuring McCovey’s son. The next day, Jan confronts her husband with the piece of paper indicating he communicated the wrong information on the arrest warrant. Overwrought with the guilt of shooting an innocent child, McCovey goes to his daughter’s grave prepared to end his life where Andrew reveals that he is an angel and was with his daughter when she died. Andrew helps McCovey face his racial prejudice stemming from the accidental death of his daughter by a black man. This subconscious racism is what made McCovey less careful in an African-American neighborhood. Andrew tells him that God loves him and forgives him, but now that he is aware of his prejudice, he must conquer it. Rev. Davis’ parish disapprovingly receives the contrite McCovey and Rev. Davis refuses to listen to his apologies. Monica, Tess and Andrew reveal themselves to convince Rev. Davis that he must forgive McCovey. McCovey remorsefully apologizes to the congregation and Rev. Davis offers his hand in peace. Jamal’s mother praises God as her son regains consciousness. Guest stars: Scott Baio and Isaiah Washington
156	14	"Bringer of Light"	Robert J. Visciglia, Jr.	Luke Schelhaas	February 11, 2001	714	15.82
Monica and Tess are captivated by the thousands of stars that decorate the beautiful night sky. Monica elaborates on the majesty of God’s heavens as it is revealed that the angels are actually sitting in planetarium hosted by Andrew. Across the city, fifteen-year-old Lucy Baker sits in her room looking at the sky, where only the moon can be seen above the city lights. Erica Baker joins her daughter and the two share a moment pondering what or who created the universe. “It's just luck,” responds Lucy’s father and science teacher, John. Lucy is not convinced that her atheist father is right. At school, tension runs high between John and Lucy, who is barely maintaining a C average. John reminds Lucy that her grade hinges on her next research paper and she needs to come up with a topic. Despite her struggles in science, Lucy excels in Monica’s English class. Monica encourages Lucy’s growing curiosity of how the universe was created by allowing Lucy to combine her research for her English essay and her science project. Lucy is pleased that her science paper to prove the existence of God will antagonize her father. John dismisses Lucy’s idea as mindless speculation and demands she pick another topic or fail the assignment. Their differences are momentarily set aside when Erica informs them that her ovarian cancer, which was in remission, has returned. John is confident that medical science will successfully get them through it again. As Erica’s health gradually declines, she begins to question her own beliefs. Lucy goes to the planetarium to continue her research despite her father’s objections. There Andrew suggests that she look into Intelligent Design Theory, which claims that the universe is too complex and precise to be a random coincidence. Andrew asks Lucy, “if you discover a watch...sitting on a tree stump. Would you assume that all these little springs and wheels and gears fell out of the sky and landed together just right to make this watch?” The next day, Lucy’s discovers from a classmate that the survival rate for a second bout with ovarian cancer is practically zero. Overwhelmed at the prospect of losing her mother, Lucy confides to Monica her feelings of helplessness. Monica consoles Lucy, explaining that her name means “bringer of light,” and that her mother is still alive and needs her now more than ever. Lucy is determined to prove the existence of God to comfort her ailing mother. Lucy turns in her two papers, but is distraught that her mother doesn't find the inspiration she is looking for in Lucy’s science paper. Monica suggests that Lucy has given her mother the wrong paper to read. Lucy, with Nurse Tess’ help, takes her mother outside the city limits to see the stars. Erica reads Lucy’s English essay, which states how grateful Lucy is for the beauty of the universe...grateful to God. John arrives at the hospital to find his wife missing and his frantic search leads him to the planetarium where Monica encourages him to take the first step and invite God into his heart. John does so, and is answered by Monica who reveals herself as an angel. Monica tells John that God loves him, and he is miraculously transported to the clearing, where the family is reunited in God’s love. Guest stars: Arye Gross, Eve Gordon and Amanda Fuller
157	15	"Thief of Hearts"	Stuart Margolin	Jason Jersey	February 18, 2001	715	13.98
Alice is a bitter woman who works at a newsstand in the lobby of a building. A sickly young homeless boy, Cory, steals her locket from the newsstand. The angels must help find the boy and locket, and find a way to make Alice and Cory a family. Guest star: Patti LuPone
158	16	"Winners, Losers and Leftovers"	Peter H. Hunt	Rosanne Welch	February 25, 2001	716	14.62
Liam Cadegan works for ApexOne Technologies, a high-tech company which has just been bought as part of a merger. While Liam is generally secure in his job and is clearly devoted to his family, he starts to become affected by the paranoia of those around him in the wake of the company president's termination. Tess points out that in a tense climate, even the least competitive person can switch gears and become a predator. Harlow meets with the employees by video conference and introduces Monica as the new vice president of community relations. Monica suggests aligning themselves with the Special Olympics and offers to arrange a meeting this weekend with her contact (Andrew). Liam, whose son will be participating in the Special Olympics, supports the idea, acknowledging the fact that his son is disabled. But Harlow preempts Monica's suggestion in favor of a corporate retreat he's scheduled this weekend. Josh Whitman (one of Liam's colleagues) reads between the lines and advises Liam to prepare for a gladiator-style competition which will likely determine the company's next president. Liam breaks the news to his son, Matt, that he won't be able to be there for the preliminaries, but he will definitely be there for the finals. Tess guides the VP's through the retreat, which is designed to get them to know each other personally so they can work together better professionally. The first game is musical chairs, in which a meek Liam is promptly eliminated. When Josh wins the contest by pulling the last chair away from Monica, Liam realizes that he will have to be ruthless if he wants to win. When Tess announces this evening's outdoor challenge, Liam realizes he must decide between attending his son's race or competing for a chance at promotion. Monica is the first to notice the change in Liam and tries to get him to see what he's sacrificing. But when she suggests he isn't actually interested in becoming the company president, he thinks she's just trying to psych him out. The final phase of the competition involves a search for clues to locate a flag to be planted at the top of a mountain. As Josh predicted, the president will be selected from the winning team. Liam's team manages to work together and capture the flag until Neil trips and breaks his ankle. Unwilling to let anything (or anyone) stand in his way, Liam proceeds to the top of the mountain alone. But when he reaches the summit, Tess reminds Liam that, in order to win, his whole team had to make it to the top. Liam rushes back to get his teammates, but finds only Monica. She tells him that Josh’s team stopped to help Neil and have taken him back to the retreat center. Liam refuses to concede, convinced that he needs this promotion in order to provide for his "special needs" son. Monica reveals herself as an angel and tells him that Matt's deepest need is his family and that Liam's most important job is being a father. Liam arrives in time to see Matt and cheer him on. Matt appears to be winning the race, but stops to aid a fellow athlete who falls down. Liam beams with pride as he watches his son cross the finish line while supporting the injured competitor. Harlow arrives and offers Liam the promotion, saying he's got the qualities he wants in a leader, someone who's willing to do what it takes to get to the top. But Liam turns down the promotion, having learned a powerful lesson not only from Monica, but from his son. Guest stars: Harry Hamlin and J. Grant Albrecht
159	17	"I Am an Angel"	Larry Peerce	R.J. Colleary	March 11, 2001	717	12.30
Seven-year-old Mickey has been despondent since his mother's recent death. He lives with his Aunt Val and his older brother Ryan. When Ryan learns that Guy Garfield, the star of Mickey's favorite television show "The Avenging Angel", will be appearing at an Angel Convention in Portland, he goes there in the hopes of persuading Guy to help his brother. Guy makes a grand entrance by way of his "golden ladder" (which takes him back and forth to Heaven on his weekly series) to cheering fans. But Monica and Tess have observed the real Guy, a boozing womanizer who is anything but angelic. Ryan stretches the truth and asks for help for his "dying" brother. Guy graciously agrees, milking the moment for all its worth. But once he's offstage, he makes it clear to Monica (who's filling in as his assistant) that he has no intention of keeping his promise. Monica decides to keep it for him by driving an unsuspecting Guy to the rural town where Mickey lives. Once Guy realizes he's been "kidnapped," he bolts and flags down the sheriff, only to discover that she is Aunt Val. While trying to sort things out, Aunt Val vents her frustration about losing her sister and how her life has suddenly changed. Ryan takes this the wrong way, assuming she resents being stuck with two kids. Ryan explains to Monica how his mom made them lunch every day and tucked them in at night and told them she loved them, whereas Aunt Val just does the minimum. Out of the spotlight, Guy gets a chance to appreciate the simple pleasures of small-town life and strikes a rapport with Val. Meanwhile, Mickey talks to Andrew (his bus driver) about praying for an angel. When Mickey comes home to find “Gabriel” in his living room, he thinks God has answered his prayer. Despite Monica's pleas, Guy assumes his angel persona and assures Mickey that his mother is in Heaven -- conjuring a make-believe image. Mickey packs his overnight bag so that "Gabriel" can take him to Heaven. When Guy tries to explain his way out of this, Mickey runs off and climbs to the top of an old grain silo to wait for the "golden ladder" himself. While Val and Ryan go for help, Monica reveals herself as an angel to Guy. She tells Guy that God wants him to be the man he was before the fame, who served God rather than serving himself. Guy climbs the silo to rescue Mickey and explains that he's not an angel, but that real angels do exist. Mickey reaches out to Guy and accidentally falls, but Andrew is there to catch him. Andrew reveals to Mickey that he took his mother to Heaven and helps him understand the difference between Guy's make-believe version of Heaven versus the awesome reality of being in God's presence. Comforted by Andrew’s words, Mickey is finally able to say goodbye to his mother and move forward. Aunt Val embraces her nephews, telling them how much she loves them, and a spiritually renewed Guy joins the restored family as they return home. Guest stars: Lee Horsley, Shannon Cochran and Tony Denman
160	18	"Visions of Thy Father"	Peter H. Hunt	Mark Goffman	March 18, 2001	718	13.51
Seventeen-year-old Jason Harris seems to have it all: a loving family, a beautiful girlfriend and aspirations of being a photojournalist. Jason’s father (Will Harris) a prominent ophthalmologist, has been urging Jason to monitor an old eye injury which resulted in detached retinas. Monica is assigned to help this family deal with a secret, and she winds up working alongside Jason in a local photo store. When Monica learns of Jason's talent for photography, she offers to introduce him to a photographer friend of hers (Andrew) at the Denver Daily Herald. Jason meets with Andrew and suggests his father for one of their "day in the life" photo spreads. Andrew takes Jason up on his suggestion and invites Jason to shoot it himself. Jason spends the next day shadowing his father, but when he returns for one last photo he walks in on his father kissing his receptionist (Sherri) and captures the moment on film. Jason returns home, now sharing the burden of this secret. Will talks to Jason privately, blaming his lapse on a midlife crisis -- a cancer scare a year ago. Will assures Jason that it's over between him and Sherri and that telling his mother would only hurt her. When Jason refuses to hand over the film, Will grabs the camera from him and rips out the film, unaware that Jason already saved the roll with the incriminating photo. His faith in his father shattered, Jason's sense of betrayal ripples into other aspects of his life as he starts skipping school and distancing himself from his girlfriend. Jason shows the incriminating photo to Monica, who tries to convince him that this is not his secret to keep. True to his word, Will has terminated his affair and replaced Sherri with a new receptionist, who is Tess. But Jason becomes overwhelmed by the burden of his father's secret and tries to numb the pain in a bottle of Scotch. Intoxicated, he crashes his father's car, rendering himself temporarily blind. As Jason is rushed to the hospital, Renee returns inside the house and discovers the incriminating photo. With time of the essence, the attending physician informs the family that a corneal transplant will be necessary to restore Jason's eyesight and that his father is the most qualified man for the job. But Jason refuses to let his father perform the surgery. Will is prepared to step out of the way without a fight, but Renee calls him on the carpet. She tells Will she found the incriminating photo and knows all about his affair. Renee tells Will to stop acting like a child and make peace with his son. She then tries to convince Jason to let her deal with their marital issues in her own way, and to let Will perform the surgery. Will returns to his office where Tess reveals herself as an angel and tells Will that God wants him to fight for his family and that he needs to apologize to Jason without making any excuses. Monica then reveals herself as an angel to Jason, and miraculously, Jason (though still blind) is able to see Monica glowing. She tells him it is up to God (not Jason) to judge his father. Will comes to see his son and apologize and Jason forgives him. As father and son embrace, Renee enters with family photos of happier times, a reminder of all that's worth fighting for in this family. Guest stars: Ryan Merriman, Christine Healy and Tom Irwin
161	19	"The Penalty Box"	Bethany Rooney	Brian Bird	April 8, 2001	719	12.89
Star hockey player, Jeff McHenry, a senior at the exclusive St. Crispin’s prep school enjoys the privileged lifestyle afforded to him by his father’s wealth. With his team on the heels of the playoffs and his father’s financial support to attend Harvard, Jeff’s future seems secure. Jeff’s arrogance fuels a rivalry with teammate, Chase Jennings, and draws alliances from both on and off the ice rink. When Jeff’s substitute History teacher, Andrew, tries to teach his class about the St. Crispian’s Day speech from Shakespeare’s Henry V, it is clear that Jeff has never understood or practiced the humility that made Henry V a great leader. Jeff’s mettle is tested when a bad investment bankrupts his father. Jeff painfully accepts his transfer to a public school, but is allayed by his father’s assurance that his college tuition is safe. Jeff’s adjustment to the socially and economically diverse Eastside High proves to be a difficult one. He refuses Monica’s invitation, as the interim hockey coach, to join the team. His disparaging remarks about the last placed team, alienates the players. That night, Jeff attends a St. Crispin’s house party and discovers that he is no longer part of that social circle. Even more distressing, is the circulating news that his father’s financial troubles have forced him to tap into his college fund. Realizing his need for an athletic scholarship, Jeff joins the Eastside team in the hopes of impressing a Harvard scout. Jeff’s rigorous and punishing practices are in opposition with Monica’s good-natured coaching. Monica questions Jeff’s incessant determination to go to Harvard and learns that it is part of his fulfillment of his deceased mother’s dream. Jeff dismisses Monica’s advice that his character determines who he is, not the name of his school. At the last game of the year, Eastside vs. St. Crispin, Jeff faces off with his school rival, Chase. Jeff tells his teammates that their only chance of winning is for him to shoulder the offense. Jeff’s talents and selfish play are unable to overcome the dominating St. Crispin’s team. With only few minutes left and Eastside is being shut out 3-0, Jeff’s frustration mounts. When Chase insults Jeff, a fight erupts and the two players receive penalties. A defeated Jeff buries his face in his hands only to look up to discover the entire arena has come to a standstill. Monica reveals herself as an angel and tells Jeff that although investments go bad and plans change, God’s love for him is constant. Monica tells Jeff that even though he made a promise to his dying mother, his mother is at a peace in God’s presence. But this game is Jeff’s chance to prove that he is a true leader. The arena becomes active and Jeff is released from the penalty box. He apologizes to his teammates and inspires them with a version of the St. Crispian’s day speech. Tess and Andrew, spectators at the game, direct the Harvard scout’s attention to Jeff. Working as a team, Eastide is able to score two quick goals. Their efforts fall short as time expires before the tying goal reaches past the goal line. Despite the loss, Jeff’s leadership skills impress the scout, who suggests that there might be an available scholarship for him next semester. Guest stars: Zachary Ty Bryan, Eric Pierpoint, Brian Gross and Adam Hendershott
162	20	"Band of Angels"	Stuart Margolin	Jennifer Wharton	April 15, 2001	721	12.94
Henry Baldwin is a blues musician who owns a music store. One of his workers in the store, Alex, tries to steal a guitar but Henry catches him. As he goes to call the police, he is shot. In court he is found guilty of murder. Monica, Tess and Ronald work in the prison. Andrew is handling Alex's sentencing hearing and when it is over Alex is sentenced to 25 years without parole. Monica asks Alex if there is anything he would like done for him before he leaves to go to the state penitentiary and he wants someone to listen to his song. Ronald finds a place and the prison governor reluctantly agrees but Monica and Ronald are responsible. During the song, Alex overcome with emotion, leaves the venue. Ronald reveals to the other inmates himself as an angel and encourages them to pray. Monica confronts Alex telling him that the guitar he was going to steal was going to be his. After revealing herself as an angel, Monica tells Alex that Henry still wants to hear his song. As Alex is being transported, his other former inmates with Andrew, Tess, Monica and Ronald sing his song and open Henry's shop as a youth Center-"Henry's House". Guest stars: Plus One, Bill Cobbs, Robert Ri'chard and Joel Grey
163	21	"The Sign of the Dove"	Jeff Kanew	Martha Williamson & Burt Pearl	April 22, 2001	720	12.88
The Sign of the Dove is a bar run by the Mason family. Tess reminds Andrew, on his day off not to disturb Monica and that there is no such thing as a day off. The proprietor of the bar, Ben Mason is getting married and Andrew needs to keep him from being killed in the explosion. A descendant of a runaway slave who becomes part of the Mason family is Nick, who runs a printing shop, and is going to set a bomb off. Tess arrives to tell Andrew he must attend to stop Nick blowing up the bomb. Adam is to take care of Ben. When Ben leaves for his wedding, he leaves at 4.40 but leaves the bible behind. When Andrew goes next door to speak to Nicholas, he finds that he is a descendant of Freeman Mason and he is given the 1856 50 cent piece. Guest stars: Richard Lawson, Larry Brandenburg, Harry Danner, Scott Lawrence, Thomas Calabro and Charles Rocket
164	22	"The Face of God"	Victor Lobl	Glenn Berenbeim	April 29, 2001	722	12.18
The leader of human genetics, Dr. Sarah Conover, is on the verge of human breakthrough and also the first to clone a human being (fetus). She has a headstrong pursuit, whose personality has been face with strong opposition from her boss, Brad Renslow, who asks her about human cloning, as does Monica, who receives another picture of the exploring scientist with the account of his final moments with Tess and Andrew. After a conversation with Monica about Einstein, Dr. Sarah decides to clone Albert and raise him as her baby. Faced with his own death, which will happen, Albert Einstein was very anxious to value the beauty that God established, rather than pretending to prolong his own life. Monica’s story is interrupted by the arrival of the candidates for Sarah’s project. When Brad finds out what Sarah is planning, he says that he doesn't think what she is doing is morally correct and fires her. Monica finishes her Einstein story and Sarah doesn't clone him. Guest stars: Annabella Sciorra and Harold Gould
165	23	"Netherlands"	Kevin Dowling	Teleplay by : Martha Williamson & Luke Schelhaas; Story by : Martha Williamson	May 6, 2001	723	14.36
Monica works with the newly created Angel (Valerie Bertinelli), who has yet to be named. The Angel is apprehensive, wondering why Monica chooses to stay on Earth after experiencing the wonder of being in God's presence. It is Monica’s job to show Gloria how to use her heart. A young girl named Madeline approaches and explains that she comes to this business complex with her mother who's looking for work. The new Angel helps Madeline fix her mechanical dog and befriends her. She decides the new Angel's name should be "Gloria" from the hymn "Angels We Have Heard On High," a song in which Tess encourages Gloria to sing to Madeline. Tess, Monica and Gloria see Andrew and explain that Andrew is the angel of death. Gloria asks them how many angels of death it takes and then they see the building that Madeline and her mother had entered explode. Tess clarifies that Gloria has a quick mind, and Monica is suddenly struck by the large scale tragedy before her, and feels unprepared to show Gloria how to use her heart only for it to be broken. As Monica walks along the highway, a charismatic man offers to give her a lift. But Monica recognizes this is no ordinary mortal, but Satan, who has taken on human form to tempt Monica. He shows her what it could be like to have a wonderful, but short human life that Monica could have. After much thought, Monica asks God for forgiveness and returns to help Tess and Gloria. Guest stars: Mandy Patinkin and Valerie Bertinelli
166	24	"Shallow Water: Part 1"	Peter H. Hunt	Story by : Martha Williamson & Burt Pearl; Teleplay by : Burt Pearl	May 13, 2001	724	11.66
Monica is assigned to help Diana, a former member of a gospel choir family. Diana has retreated from reality following a tragic bus accident that killed many of the family members. Diana's therapist tries to help her remember what happened after Joshua tells his brother Jed to sing his new song and when their father gets angry Jed stays behind. Monica and the therapist try to look for Jed who they believe is the key to getting through to Diana. Guest stars: Delta Burke, David Canary, John Schneider, Randy Travis, Nell Carter, Keb' Mo', Rue McClanahan, Faye Dunaway, Gaither Vocal Band (David Phelps, Guy Penrod, Mark Lowry and Bill Gaither) and their Homecoming Friends
167	25	"Shallow Water: Part 2"	Peter H. Hunt	Martha Williamson & Burt Pearl	May 20, 2001	725	13.14
Monica and Tess introduce Diana to two new friends and eventually reunite her with her father and mother in law as well as her brother in law who survived the bus accident. They all say good-bye to Joshua (Diana's husband, Jed's brother and the parent's son) because he's been in a coma for years. The family then begin touring again. Guest stars: Delta Burke, David Canary, John Schneider, Randy Travis, Nell Carter, Keb' Mo', Rue McClanahan and Faye Dunaway
