= William Stanford Davis =

American actor (born 1951)

- Born: August 7, 1951 (age 75); St. Louis, Missouri, U.S.
- Occupation: Actor
- Years active: 1995–present

William Stanford Davis (born August 7, 1951) is an American actor. He is best known for his role as custodian Mr. Johnson on the ABC sitcom Abbott Elementary since 2021, for which he earned a nomination for Outstanding Supporting Actor in a Comedy Series at the 54th NAACP Image Awards, an award he later won at the 57th NAACP Image Awards for the same role.

His career began with a minor role as a custodian on the CBS soap opera The Bold and the Beautiful in 1995 and includes recurring roles as Potato Pie on the Showtime crime drama series Ray Donovan (2013–2017) and Mr. Riggs on the TNT thriller series Snowpiercer (2020).

== Early life ==
Davis was born on August 7, 1951, in The Ville in northern St. Louis, Missouri, where he attended an all-Black elementary school before going to an integrated school in fifth grade. After graduating from Northwest High School, he went to Lincoln University, a historically Black university (HBCU) in Jefferson City, Missouri. He was inspired to become an actor during high school, when a teacher brought him to see the Negro Ensemble Company perform. From high school to college, he was the frontman for the pop and R&B band The Fabulous Paramount Revue, which opened for The O'Jays among other acts before disbanding during the Vietnam War.

== Career ==
He worked as a radio personality at a country radio station in Texas before moving to Los Angeles to pursue a career in acting at age 33, inspired by seeing Sidney Poitier in the 1958 film The Defiant Ones. His car caught on fire which led to him staying in Los Angeles. His first role was as a custodian on the soap opera The Bold and the Beautiful in 1995.

Davis is a member of the Actors Studio. He had minor roles on the TNT series Snowpiercer, the NBC series Studio 60 on the Sunset Strip, the ABC series The Practice, the HBO series Curb Your Enthusiasm, Perry Mason, on the OWN series If Loving You Is Wrong, and in the films So B. It, Please Stand By, Holly Day, Dead Women Walking, Adopt a Highway, and A Holiday Chance. He had recurring roles as Coach Max on the Apple TV+ series Swagger and as Potato Pie on the Showtime series Ray Donovan.

Davis stars in the Quinta Brunson-helmed ABC sitcom Abbott Elementary as Mr. Johnson, the eccentric longtime janitor of the show's titular elementary school, in 2021. He auditioned over Zoom and was meant to only be a guest star but soon became a recurring character, appearing in all 12 episodes of the show's first season. He became a series regular in its second season, the first series regular role of his career. He partially based his portrayal of the character on his paternal grandmother, who he described as a "filter-less" "conspiracy theorist" and "the nosiest woman in the neighborhood". For his role on Abbott Elementary, he was nominated for Outstanding Supporting Actor in a Comedy Series at the 54th NAACP Image Awards in 2023. He was inducted into Phi Beta Sigma fraternity as an honorary brother at their 2023 conclave, held in Houston. Davis won a Screen Actors Guild Award for Outstanding Performance by an Ensemble in a Comedy Series in 2022 and received a second nomination in 2024.

== Filmography ==
=== Television ===
List of television series and roles
Year	Title	Role	Notes
1995	The Bold and the Beautiful	Janitor	2 episodes
1998	The Secret Diary of Desmond Pfeiffer	Lincoln Impersonator	
1999	The Practice	Clarence Barnett	Episode: "A Day in the Life"
1999	Sister, Sister	Reverend Tatum	Episode: "Fly Away Home"
1999	Ally McBeal	Jim	3 episodes
1999	Time of Your Life	Pawn Shop Owner	2 episodes
2001	James Dean	Train Conductor	TV movie
2001	Bette	The Customer	Episode: "A Method to Her Madness"
2002	The Movement	Silas	TV movie
2002	Robbery Homicide Division	Security Guard Ellis	Episode: "City of Strivers"
2003	Touched by an Angel	Doug	Episode: "Private Eyes"
2003	The District	Mr. Gillis	Episode: "Untouchable"
2003	Strong Medicine	Doug	Episode: "Risk"
2003	Cold Case	DeAnte Rollins	Episode: "The Runner"
2003	American Dreams	Joe	Episode: "The Long Goodbye"
2004	Angel	Security Guard	Episode: "Damage"
2004	The Guardian	Brian	Episode: "Without Consent"
2004	The Shield	Deon	Episode: "Slipknot"
2004	LAX	Engineer Dietrich	Episode: "Finnegan Again, Begin Again"
2004	NYPD Blue	Howard Jackson	Episode: "The Vision Thing"
2004	Hollywood Division	Neighbor	TV movie
2006	Sons & Daughters	Cook	Episode: "Bowling Night"
2006	Desperate Housewives	William	Episode: "Could I Leave You?"
2006	My Name Is Earl	Neighbor	Episode: "Stole a Badge"
2006	The Closer	Homeless Man	Episode: "Head Over Heels"
2006–2007	Studio 60 on the Sunset Strip	Floor Manager	8 episodes
2007–2009	Lincoln Heights	Jake Wyatt	13 episodes
2007	Passions	Prison Doctor	2 episodes
2007	Marlowe	Bartender	TV movie
2008	Shark	Sonny Gore	Episode: "Partners in Crime"
2008	CSI: Crime Scene Investigation	Mechanic	Episode: "A Thousand Days on Earth"
2008	Terminator: The Sarah Connor Chronicles	Pastor Jonas	Episode: "Earthlings Welcome Here"
2009	Saving Grace	Group Member at Party	Episode: "She's a Lump"
2010	America's Most Wanted	Dante	Episode: "America's Most Wanted's 1,000th Episode Special Edition"
2010	Bones	Floyd Barber	Episode: "The Witch in the Wardrobe"
2011	The Event	The Elder	Episode: "Inostranka"
2011	Harry's Law	Kareem Anderson	Episode: "In the Ghetto"
2011	Nick Swardson's Pretend Time	Bathroom Attendant	Episode: "Flying Stripper"
2012	Shameless	Conrad	Episode: "Just Like the Pilgrims Intended"
2012	The Finder	Earl	Episode: "The Inheritance"
2012	The Big Bang Theory	Dry Cleaner	Episode: "The Parking Spot Escalation"
2012	Prodigy Bully	Mr. Douglas	TV movie
2013–2017	Ray Donovan	Potato Pie	Recurring role; 20 episodes
2014–2017	If Loving You Is Wrong	Mr. Kym	6 episodes
2015	When Duty Calls	Clyde Pierce	TV movie
2015	Criminal Minds	Sam Pritchett	Episode: "Lockdown"
2016	Chicago Med	Ed Brennan	Episode: "Choices"
2016	The Middle	Projectionist	Episode: "Hecks at a Movie
2017	Code Black	Emmanuel	Episode: "Unfinished Business"
2019	Light as a Feather	Old Man	Episode: "...Hungry Like a Wolf"
2020	Curb Your Enthusiasm	Chulu Porter	Episode: "Artificial Fruit"
2020	Perry Mason	Daniel Madison	Episode: "Chapter Two"
2020	Snowpiercer	Mr. Riggs	5 episodes
2021	Swagger	Coach Max	3 episodes
2021–present	Abbott Elementary	Mr. Johnson	Recurring (season 1), Main role (season 2–); 33 episodes
2023	Truth Be Told	Agathia	Episode: "Her, Armed with Sorrow Sore"
2025	Side Quest	Earl	Episode: "Pull List"
2025	It's Always Sunny in Philadelphia	Mr. Johnson	Episode: "The Gang F***s Up Abbott Elementary"

=== Film ===
List of films and roles
Year	Title	Role	Notes
1997	Running Time	Buzz	Credited as Stan Davis
1998	Primary Colors	Jack Mandela Washington	
1998	City of Angels	Construction Foreman	
1999	Ragdoll	Pere	
2000	The Prophecy 3: The Ascent	Portly Coroner	
2001	James Dean	Train Conductor	
2005	A Lot like Love	Priest	
2005	Self Medicated	Gabe	
2005	The Big Empty	Doctor #6	
2007	Hallowed Ground	Truck Driver	
2009	Across the Hall	Custodian	
2009	Accused at 17	Detective Gilson	
2010	Barry Munday	Greens Keeper	
2016	So B. It	Man at Cab Co.	
2016	Cardboard Boxer	Jazzy	
2017	Handsome	Lester	
2017	Please Stand By	Creed	Uncredited
2018	Holly Day	Thaddeus	
2019	Adopt a Highway	Hatty	
2021	A Holiday Chance	Bernie	
2025	Undercard	Baba T	
2025	Diary of a Wimpy Kid: The Last Straw	Troopmaster Barrett	Voice role

== Awards and nominations ==
Year	Award	Category	Work	Result	Ref.
2006	Phoenix Film Festival	Best Ensemble	Self Medicated	Nominated	
2023	Screen Actors Guild Award	Outstanding Performance by an Ensemble in a Comedy Series	Abbott Elementary	Won	
2023	Peabody Award		Abbott Elementary	Won	
2023	NAACP Image Awards	Outstanding Supporting Actor in a Comedy Series	Abbott Elementary	Nominated	
2024	NAACP Image Awards	Outstanding Supporting Actor in a Comedy Series	Abbott Elementary	Won	
2024	Screen Actors Guild Award	Outstanding Performance by an Ensemble in a Comedy Series	Abbott Elementary	Nominated	
2024	Online Film & Television Association	Best Supporting Actor in a Comedy Series	Abbott Elementary	Nominated	
2024	Black Reel Awards for Television	Outstanding Supporting Performance in a Comedy Series	Abbott Elementary	Nominated	
2024	Astra Television Awards	Best Supporting Actor in Broadcast Network or Cable Comedy Series	Abbott Elementary	Nominated	
2025	Screen Actors Guild Award	Outstanding Performance by an Ensemble in a Comedy Series	Abbott Elementary	Nominated	
2025	NAACP Image Award	Outstanding Supporting Actor in a Comedy Series	Abbott Elementary	Nominated	
2025	Black Reel Awards for Television	Outstanding Supporting Performance in a Comedy Series	Abbott Elementary	Nominated	
2025	Newport Beach TV Festival	Outstanding Comedy Ensemble	Abbott Elementary	Won	
