= Nathan Norton =

American actor (born 1993)

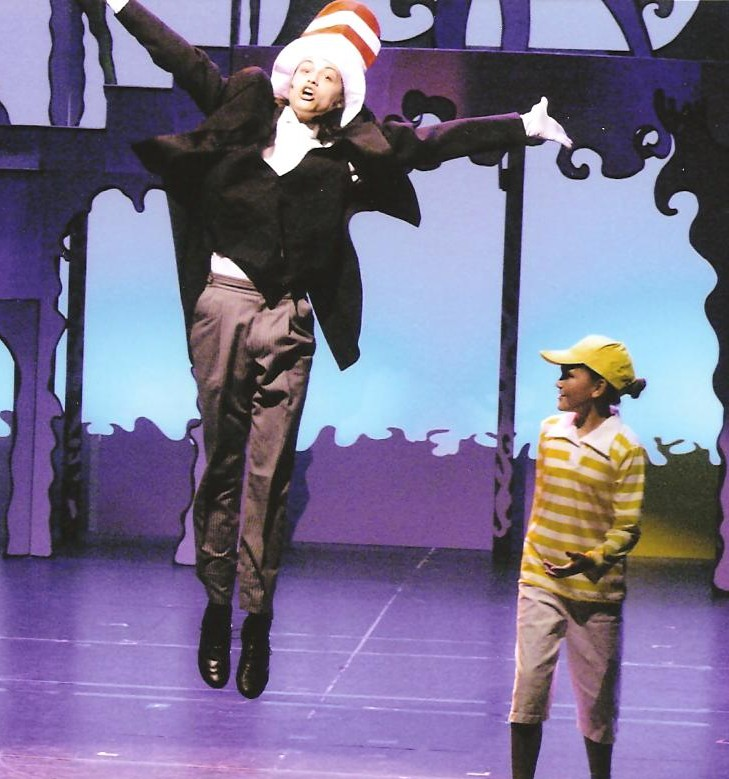
- Norton as The Cat in the Hat in Seussical the Musical
- Born: Nathan Howard Norton; August 4, 1993 (age 31); Los Angeles, California, United States
- Occupation: Actor

Nathan Norton (born August 4, 1993) is an American actor. He co-starred with Lukas Haas and Kelli Garner in The Youth in Us. Directed by Joshua Leonard, the film achieved cult status after premiering at the Sundance Film Festival.

Nathan had a recurring role in the HBO series, Six Feet Under, and has made guest appearances on numerous television shows, including Without a Trace, ER, Touched by an Angel, Strong Medicine, Grounded for Life, and Just Shoot Me!. He also appeared in a role in the pilot for the comedy Cracking Up.

Norton has also done voice over work on several commercials, as well as the film, Cirque du Freak: The Vampire's Assistant.
