= Touched by an Angel season 8 =

Touched by an Angel
- Season 8
- Starring: Roma Downey; Della Reese; John Dye; Valerie Bertinelli
- No. of episodes: 22

Release
- Original network: CBS
- Original release: September 29, 2001 – May 11, 2002

Season chronology
- ← Previous; Season 7 Next → Season 9

The eighth and penultimate season of the American dramatic television series Touched by an Angel aired on CBS from September 29, 2001 through May 11, 2002, spanning 22 episodes. Created by John Masius and produced by Martha Williamson, the series chronicled the cases of two angels, Monica (Roma Downey) and her supervisor Tess (Della Reese), who bring messages from God to various people to help them as they reach a crossroads in their lives. They are frequently joined by Andrew (John Dye), the angel of death. In this penultimate season, a new trainee angel, Gloria (Valerie Bertinelli) is also added to the cast.

The episodes use the song "Walk with You", performed by Reese, as their opening theme.

== Episodes ==
No. overall	No. in season	Title	Directed by	Written by	Original release date	Prod. code	Viewers (millions)
168	1	"Holy of Holies"	Bethany Rooney	Martha Williamson and Burt Pearl & Luke Schelhaas	September 29, 2001	805	8.99
While the angels begin training their newest member Gloria, a college professor attempts to find the Ark of the Covenant. After revealing a first century B.C. copy of Nehemiah's memoir to Andrew, a widowed 88-year-old lady settles her promise by having Andrew take it to the post office and deliver to Paul, who's at college. Tess, Monica and Gloria are floating around Paul's campus eager to work on the next assignment. When Paul shows this scroll to Thomas, the professor takes it and doesn't tell his student it is valuable. Gloria is acting as one of Thomas' students. Thomas traces the Ark of the Covenant to Mount Nebo after having a conversation with Gloria. Lacking the funding, he decides he will go to Mount Nebo himself to find it. Monica, Tess, Andrew and Gloria all come with him. Guest stars: Roy Dotrice, Julianna McCarthy, Shareen Mitchell, R.D. Robb and William Russ
169	2	"The Perfect Game"	Frank E. Johnson	Glenn Berenbeim	October 6, 2001	803	9.53
A perfectionist who blames his son for a two-hit shut out is about to reconcile with him. Permitting Ben to release all the anger, Monica comes on down as the new team's trainee to support him. His father prevents Ben from seeing his grandfather, who was also a great baseball player in his time. While Ben's game is perfect on his own, the angels take Ben and Norm into grandfather's memory to reconcile the debate surrounding "the perfect game," Tess shows them how the game began, how Ben's grandfather pitched, how the Babe was defeated, and how anger and pride led a promising pitcher to a life as a baseball clown. With the memory played out, sons forgive fathers, fathers embrace sons, and Ben’s perfect game resumes as though he never left it. Guest stars: Chaz Lamar Shepherd, Hank Aaron, Hinton Battle, Lee Weaver, Jeremy Elliott, Bradford English, Ernie Hudson and Omar Gooding
170	3	"The Birthday Present"	Peter H. Hunt	R.J. Colleary	October 13, 2001	806	10.29
An alcoholic widower takes his rage out on his two young children. His son Robby hides his daughter Sarah from him in an old fallout shelter when he gets drunk. Robby hides Sarah and comes back to the house. A package for Robby comes but his father asks him what's inside and Robby lies saying it's his birthday present. After their father angrily takes his belt off to beat Robby, he runs downstairs with the package that came earlier --- a gun he bought illegally to protect Sarah and himself. Robby waits downstairs with the gun in his hand so that he can shoot his father. Andrew tells him he can't undo this action and Robby runs back upstairs and out their door, leaving the box with the gun in the bushes. A shy mailman --- mourning the death of his grandmother---accidentally kills the boy when he runs into the street. Tess comforts the Sarah inside the shelter while Monica, who'd been the grandmother's final nurse, helps the mailman find the courage to help stop the father from injuring his children again. Guest stars: Kirk Cameron, James MacDonald, Michael Welch, Skye McCole Bartusiak, Benito Martinez and Gloria Stuart
171	4	"Manhunt"	Victor Lobl	Danna Doyle	October 20, 2001	804	9.04
The Angels attend Happy Hour at the Monte Carlo, a bar run by one of Tess's former assignments, where she sees Tess and Andrew hang out, while Monica must do a case about a lonely woman struggles to cope with a recent breakup, while a delivery man who secretly pines for her tries to find the courage to approach her. Guest stars: Debbie Reynolds, Sarah Paulson, Christopher Wiehl, Scott Reeves and Jennifer Leigh Warren
172	5	"Chutzpah"	Frank E. Johnson	Teleplay by : Allen Estrin & Joseph Telushkin; Story by : Allen Estrin & Joseph Telushkin and Daniel H. Forer	October 27, 2001	801	8.13
Against Tess's advice, Monica leaves Gloria alone at the Portland bus stop. While Monica is away, Gloria meets some skinheads who tell her Jews are pigs and that the holocaust never happened. When the bus leaves, Gloria meets a Jewish sopher (someone who writes the Torah by hand) named Sam who she accidentally insults by repeating what the skinheads told her. In order for Gloria to learn the truth, Monica brings her to the holocaust museum and Gloria eventually apologizes to Sam. Monica meanwhile works with Rachel an editorial cartoonist, that conflicts with Sam, who happens to be her Jewish father when her popularity soars for writing "edgy" cartoons that portray Jews satirically, until a showdown with anti-Semitic skinheads at their synagogue teaches both the cartoonist and new angel Gloria a powerful lesson in fighting hate with knowledge, as well as helping Rachel and Sam reconcile their differences. Guest stars: David Margulies, Meredith Scott Lynn and Carol Locatell
173	6	"Famous Last Words"	Peter H. Hunt	Brian Bird	November 3, 2001	808	10.16
The angels try to help a death row inmate reconcile with his estranged mother before his sentence is carried out---for killing his abusive stepfather. Guest stars: Sean Patrick Flanery, Veronica Cartwright and Mark Rolston
174	7	"Most Likely to Succeed"	Stuart Margolin	Burt Pearl	November 10, 2001	809	10.72
Monica assigns Gloria to a young, successful billionaire, who also attends his high school reunion seeking revenge on the football player who tormented him. Tess learns he was getting a new program designing for his computer. When a surprising turn of events arise, the angels must help overcome his resentment and forgive. In the end, Tess crowns the head cheerleader as she and her husband take the stage as King and Queen of the Reunion. Guest stars: Christopher Daniel Barnes, Dylan Bruno, Jennifer Morrison and Toby Keith
175	8	"Heaven's Portal"	Bethany Rooney	Glenn Berenbeim	November 24, 2001	810	12.41
Upset that his parents are separating, a rebellious teen takes Gloria to a rave, where they both do drugs. Tess, Andrew, Monica, and the boy's mom all go to the rave to intervene. Guest stars: Stephanie Zimbalist and Peter Scolari
176	9	"When Sunny Gets Blue"	Frank E. Johnson	Jason Jersey	December 1, 2001	807	8.76
A young man, Mike, tries to discover the truth about his absent father, who suffers from paranoid schizophrenia. Monica and Gloria meet the young man at a cafe. Monica can't find the father, Simon, on an online database. Tess looks at Gloria's records, then asks her where she saw the father's name; Gloria produces an old jazz album featuring Simon K. and the Chattanooga Express. As the record is being played inside the cafe, Simon meets Mike and the angels soon help Simon out of his hallucinations and reunite with his family. Guest stars: Zachary Quinto and John Savage
177	10	"Angels Anonymous"	Larry Peerce	R.J. Colleary	December 15, 2001	811	9.08
An aging busboy tempted into an arson scheme finds a way to resist temptation when the angels reunite him with people from his past---his one-time high school history students, each of whom has dilemmas of their own to resolve, and all of whom remember precious lessons he once taught them, where they all attend a restaurant at a run down bar and restaurant. Andrew behaves as a marriage counselor, sending Yvette and Peter there when they have trouble talking about anything but work, Monica locates a paramedic and sends him on a wild goose chase ending to the bar, and Tess sends Leigh and her 'I’m the boss' husband Jimmy to the dive in order to squeeze lunch into their thoroughly planned outing. Guest stars: Alexis Cruz, Chris Potter, Molly Hagan, Geoffrey Blake, Leila Kenzle, A.J. Johnson, Erik King, Jack McGee and Hal Linden
178	11	"A Winter Carol"	Victor Lobl	Martha Williamson & Burt Pearl	December 16, 2001	813	14.64
A man who is a drumming teacher to a boy goes missing on September 11, 2001 whose wallet is later discovered at ground zero. The boy's mother is the mayor of the town and refuses to grieve because she has too many responsibilities. The boy's elder brother has lost his Christmas spirit after his younger brother's heart is broken and decides to enlist in the army to kill as many terrorists as possible. The mother has not laughed in ages and refuses to go to a doctor's appointment in Manhattan. The mother and two brothers find out that the drumming teacher's present to the boy was a drum and the Mormon Tabernacle Choir to sing Battle Hymn of the Republic at the Christmas pageant, and Tess is volunteered to play the organ at the Christmas services. Guest stars: Blair Brown, Steven Curtis Chapman and The Mormon Tabernacle Choir
179	12	"The Last Chapter"	Ricardo Mendez Matta	Martha Williamson	January 12, 2002	812	8.07
Monica visits Elizabeth Jessup to help her finish her memoirs. However, Elizabeth doesn't want to finish it and her granddaughter, now a teenager, doesn't know that she was saved out of the fire by Monica. (Note: As depicted in the season 1 episode "Tough Love" (1994)) Tess demands that Monica is there as the answer to the prayer of somebody else's. She collapses after being delivered her new car, a Lincoln. When admitted to hospital, it is found she has a brain tumour, and Tess takes on the roll of the nurse. Gloria comes to type the last chapter and her daughter and granddaughter learn the truth. Guest star: Phylicia Rashad
180	13	"Ship-in-a-Bottle"	Armand Mastroianni	Rita Russell	January 26, 2002	814	7.93
Tevis Lockwood is a successful widowed father with two young daughters and an obsession over controlling every aspect of his life. When one daughter---suffering sickle cell anaemia---takes ill, and the doctor in charge of the emergency room can't prioritize her in a room crowded with flu patients, he tries driving her forty miles to a sickle cell specialty clinic---but her death en route causes first rage and then redemption for the stricken father when the angels step in. Monica visits as part of the transition team of the shipping company, and all thanks to Gloria, tries to protect the girls, while Tevis settles in for his work, who comes to the office, pleased with his new station in life and is anxious to make an impression of the world. When the receptionist's desk is empty, Tess comes with a resume and answers the phone for him. Impressed by her plan, Tevis hires her immediately, not a moment before Joaquin, the real receptionist arrives. Guest stars: Lee Garlington, Aysia Polk, Arreale Davis and Mykelti Williamson
181	14	"The Blue Angel"	Larry Peerce	Glenn Berenbeim	February 2, 2002	816	8.65
Max and Elmer are 50-year-old friends who work together on a TV station. Max is a chain smoker who refuses to listen to Elmer and stop smoking. Max has also had 3 angels; Tess, Monica and Andrew speak to him at different stages in his life, but refused to listen to all of them. Gloria is his last chance. Max nearly dies when he collapses due to emphysema. When the "Blue angel", a strip show is in jeopardy, due to the usual girl having a cold, Gloria offers to help, not knowing what she is in for. Tess appears, who tells Gloria of her experience with Max. When Elmer finds out Gloria is doing the Blue Angel, he quits. As Gloria starts to take her clothes off, she also reveals herself as an angel. It was 1954, and Max was back to being at the top of his game, directing a variety show for July 4. Everything was perfect, except for the blonde singer, who hired is horrible, despite Tess's attempts to instruct her. He had a dream that was lost, but Monica present the notebook to him with his list. Guest stars: Ernest Borgnine and Tom Bosley
182	15	"Secrets and Lies"	Armand Mastroianni	Brian Bird	March 2, 2002	817	8.59
The angels have a challenge on their hands over a man's affair very early in his otherwise happy marriage coming back to haunt him when his daughter is stricken with leukemia and needs a bone marrow transplant to survive . . . and the only compatible donor is the son he fathered with his former lover. Tess helps the former lover overcome years-long resentments with a novel approach that doesn't involve revealing herself as an angel, as Monica helps the man seek forgiveness from both the former lover and his wife in order to facilitate the transplant. Guest stars: Jeanette Brox, John Heard, Sherri Hursey, Patricia Kalember and Trever O'Brien
183	16	"The Princeless Bride"	Kevin Dowling	Luke Schelhaas	March 9, 2002	818	7.66
Liz and Jonas are a couple about to get married in Washington, DC, on their wedding day. However, due to the fact that the weather cancels all flight and therefore all guests arriving, as well as Jonas being annoyed that she is so selfish. The reception is held and street people are invited to eat with Liz. Andrew drives Jonas to Washington, DC, instead of New York as he requested. Jonas is mugged, his wallet, ring and shoes stolen and is left for dead to freeze to death on the street, who has been broken down by Liz, and refuses to show and tell Monica, Tess and Gloria about the wedding she had requested, and how she'll never deserve it. Later that evening, the angels show up at Liz’s door to throw the pre-wedding slumber party she wanted to have. Guest stars: Kim Rhodes, Lainie Kazan and Neil Patrick Harris
184	17	"Hello, I Love You"	Frank E. Johnson	R.J. Colleary	April 6, 2002	815	8.14
A little girl wants to find her father for the upcoming school father-daughter dance, but when her mother is in an accident, the search becomes even more desperate and with Monica, she goes looking for 4 separate Jacksons plus a handyman who is unlisted in the phone book. The person she is looking for is tracked down by Tess when officer Jackson pulls Tess over for speeding and is then brought to the hospital.
185	18	"Minute by Minute"	Robert J. Visciglia, Jr.	Rosanne Welch	April 13, 2002	802	6.85
Three teens plot to bomb their Catholic high school as the angels try to help a nun who bombed a chemistry lab when she was younger (as revenge for what happened to her brother) to stop them. John, Cory and Bobby are all 17, and like the 2, Bobby's the most responsible for planting the bombs. While John and Cory are planting the bombs, they run into the nun and John shoots her. By the time he approaches John and Cory, Bobby realizes that he can’t go through with it. Instead, he heads down the street to Millie’s, the greasy spoon diner where he works. He apologizes to Tess, the new manager, for arriving work late, and begins his shift instructing Gloria how to work the register. They all get along well. After learning that John's original plan included the bombs going off at 8 o'clock all along, Cory and Bobby try to get the students to get out of the school before the bombs go off. When nobody listens to Cory and John about bombs being planted in the school, the nun decides to pull the school's fire alarm instead of getting out of the school to save everyone. Guest star: Mary McDonnell
186	19	"The Bells of St. Peters"	Robert J. Visciglia, Jr.	Glenn Berenbeim	May 4, 2002	819	7.27
Maggie di Santo and her husband Brian who is a neurologist are a husband and wife doctor team at a hospital. Maggie's mother, Rose also works at the hospital and wants to go to Rome but her health is not up to it, as she is feeling tired. Maggie wants her to go with someone so Maggie and Brian were to go with her. Rose believes in doing the best you can and after that is Que Sera Sera. She also believes in luck and crossing her fingers. Maggie believes in science but not in God or faith. When Monica replaces Rose temporarily due to her tiredness, she is permanently on staff when Maggie gets angry with Rose after losing a mother in the delivery room and the baby survives. It turns out later that Rose's white blood count is through the roof which means she has leukemia, is the reason for her tiredness, and she needs surgery. After the surgery, Tess comes to Maggie to tell she needs a break. During this, Rose tries to leave for Rome, but her health won't allow it and Rose collapses. When Rose is back in the hospital, Tess asks Maggie if she believes in miracles but she says she doesn't and after they take another test it seems Rose's white blood count is healthy again. Brian and Maggie rejoice, hug and Maggie thanks God. Guest stars: Doris Roberts, Tom Verica and Mare Winningham
187	20	"The Impossible Dream"	Peter H. Hunt	Brian Bird	May 4, 2002	820	8.02
A matriarch, Aunt Charlotte Hunter, who is a teacher at a local school has decided to retire. However all of her family's dreams are coming true except for one-Reggie Hunter. The family want to have a concert for Charlotte retirement and want Reggie to sing but he doesn't want to. Andrew asks Reggie about why he quit and finds that when he auditioned he only sang once and was rejected. The family's situation changes when Martin Hunter, the loan officer at a bank is arrested and jailed for being associated with fraud. Monica hires Gloria as Martin's lawyer. They need $50,000 bail money but do not have the money. Reggie finds out that he could have been a big success. Tess comes to find out what Reggie will be singing at the concert. Reggie at first says that they need money but Tess says they have to focus on what they do have. When Reggie tries to sell his mother's piano for $40,000, Charlotte refuses and then tells Reggie that Barry Gordie did call back. unknown to Reggie and Martin took the call and said his folks had died. when Reggie tries to look for the serial number to sell the piano, Andrew and Tess show up and Tess asks him why he didn't fight for his dream. Tess then reveals what his mother has written in her letter. Meanwhile, Monica is speaking to Martin about praying about the loans he was giving out. Martin is later released and Reggie sings The Impossible Dream with Tess at the farewell concert. Guest stars: Lee Chamberlin, Penny Johnson Jerald, Joe Morton and Luther Vandross
188	21	"For All the Tea in China"	Stuart Margolin	Martha Williamson & Luke Schelhaas	May 5, 2002	822	10.30
At a Chinese orphanage, Gloria takes care of an orphaned baby in the middle of a freezing winter night. Monica is a maid for a wealthy woman, Lady Berrington. Her only living relative is her grandson James and his wife Sarah who live with her. James reveals terrible news to his grandmother, he and his wife are infertile. They show their intent to adopt a baby girl from China. Lady Berrington first disapproves, but later reluctantly agrees to the trans-racial adoption as that is the only way to continue the family. God had decided that the couple are to adopt the baby. But Andrew comes to Gloria and says there's been a complication. When Tess comes, as an adoption worker, Lady Berrington becomes unfriendly and melodramatic, at which James confronts her. Tess returns to let Lady Berrington know that the adoption had disapproved because the real Lady Berrington never emigrated to the US. Lady Berrington admits to James and Sarah that is actually Gladys Picket, an orphan who worked for Lord and Lady Berrington until they died and came to the U.S. as a war widow, running her tea business under Berrington's name. When a dismayed James storms off. Gladys brings up her upbringing in China, where she lived with her missionary parents. She tells how she and a friend, Li Na, were separated from her parents during a 1937 evacuation, and how she never saw them again, returning to England on her own. Since then Gladys has been unwilling to look at a Chinese girl, as it reminds her of her loss. When the truth is out and accepted, Tess releases the adoption and they head to China to meet the baby, whom Sarah and James have named Rose, and to allow Gladys to come to terms with her past. At the orphanage, Gladys sings to Rose and the one woman recognizes her as her old friend. They hug and Li Na shows Gladys the locket she'd given her when they were separated. Guest stars: Brian McNamara and Angela Lansbury
189	22	"Forever Young"	Victor Lobl	R.J. Colleary	May 11, 2002	821	7.43
The family of motivational speaker Don Costello is breaking apart quietly but severely in the wake of teen daughter/honor student Kimmie's murder by a former boyfriend, unless Monica (assigned to Don), Gloria (assigned to young son Justin, who blames himself for his sister's death), Tess (assigned to wife Stacy, who can't let her daughter go and meets her spirit in the park daily), and Andrew (who took Kimmie to heaven) can convince them to honour more than mourn her. Guest stars: Donna Bullock, Myles Jeffrey, Bethany Richards, Mike Erwin and Gregory Harrison
