= Touched by an Angel season 6 =

Touched by an Angel
- Season 6
- Starring: Roma Downey; Della Reese; John Dye
- No. of episodes: 26

Release
- Original network: CBS
- Original release: September 26, 1999 – May 21, 2000

Season chronology
- ← Previous; Season 5 Next → Season 7

The sixth season of the American dramatic television series Touched by an Angel aired CBS from September 26, 1999 through May 21, 2000, spanning 26 episodes. Created by John Masius and produced by Martha Williamson, the series chronicled the cases of two angels, Monica (Roma Downey) and her supervisor Tess (Della Reese), who bring messages from God to various people to help them as they reach a crossroads in their lives. They are frequently joined by Andrew (John Dye), the angel of death.

The episodes use the song "Walk with You", performed by Reese, as their opening theme.

CBS released the sixth season on DVD on September 25, 2012.

== Episodes ==
No. overall	No. in season	Title	Directed by	Written by	Original release date	Prod. code	Viewers (millions)
117	1	"Such a Time as This"	Martha Mitchell	Martha Williamson	September 26, 1999	603	18.36
Senator Kate Cooper is about to be re-elected, but does not want anything to hurt her campaign. Dr. Joseph Alcott comes to her to do something about the slaves in Sudan. Her son Thomas and his schoolmates decide to raise money to free the slaves, but the campaign contributors discourage her from having anything to do with the atrocities of child slavery in Sudan. Leading that little child there, Tess reveals all about Thomas. Their fight comes to a head when James, who has never voted, accuses Kate of never forgiving him for the death of their son because they never had health insurance, and that she wears the locket to show him his faults. After Thomas has raised over $3,000, when she refuses to go to Sudan, James goes to register to vote so he can vote against her. Monica reveals herself and tells her God is calling her to go to Sudan to witness the abuses and tells her the story of Queen Esther from the Bible. When all of the money is gone, Kate tearfully exchanges the locket of her dead son, Sam to free the last slave. Guest stars: Lindsay Crouse, Joe Spano, Jake Thomas and Ruben Santiago-Hudson
118	2	"The Compass"	Peter H. Hunt	Glenn Berenbeim & Martha Williamson	October 3, 1999	604	16.73
In July 1944, a month after D-Day, a squad led by Sgt. Walker is tired and anything but unified. Making their way through the Normandy battlefields in an attempt to reclaim France, Tess tells Monica, on a search and rescue mission, that she is to help Private Joe Faraday become a hero. Monica is caught comforting a dying German soldier, and is arrested as a prisoner of war and a spy. Monica encourages the squad to write letters to their loved ones before the Germans come. When two of the last soldiers retreat to a house, where one of them dies, Monica tells Private Faraday to retrieve the letters. She reveals herself, and when he returns to the house, is shot. Dying, he asks Monica to help him write a letter.
119	3	"The Last Day of the Rest of Your Life"	Robert J. Visciglia, Jr.	Burt Pearl	October 10, 1999	605	17.03
Corey, Stasi, Dolores, and Larry meet at a support group, answering the same ad: "Are You Ready for the Last Day of the Rest of Your Life?". They are all dying. Rachel shows up too, but something deep and personal keeps her from going inside. As facilitator of the group, Monica explains that their purpose will be "to give meaning to the life you're leaving behind, and explore what it means to face death." All of the group rally behind Rachel when they find out what she is suffering from a tumor, but they are also refusing to do something about it. Guest stars: David Kaufman, Lenny Clarke, Mark Moses, Kathy Ireland, Nancy McKeon and Eileen Brennan
120	4	"The Letter"	Peter H. Hunt	Danna Doyle	October 17, 1999	602	18.11
Tess must convince Roberto Morante that his son Tino is a gifted musician. Monica must try to help Tino not to give up on his gift when his father refuses to give permission to attend the school of music. He also has serious back problems and cannot work, and dismisses going to a music school as a joke. After Tess reveals herself and the others as angels, she tells Roberto his daughter is a dancer. The professor from the college arrives to meet Tino who plays Ludwig van Beethoven's Ode to Joy. Guest stars: Carlo Alban, Julie Carmen and Alexis Cruz
121	5	"Til Death Do Us Part"	Tim Van Patten	Rosanne Welch & Christine Pettit	October 24, 1999	601	19.06
Molly Avery's preparations for her husband Jordan's 40th birthday party are interrupted by a phone call from her doctor's office, informing her that she may have cancer, the same disease that killed her mother and grandmother at the same young age as her. Andrew believes she is his assignment, but Tess warns him there may be surprises. Despite Andrew's pleas, Molly refuses to tell her husband. Jimmy, Molly and Jordan's son, suddenly interrupts with the news that one of the cows has gone into labor. They struggle to deliver the calf and it is born premature. Jimmy plans to raise the calf and name it Hannibal, but Jordan tells him that he does not know what it takes – some things were meant to live and some to die. Jordan says he wants Jimmy to face facts, and Molly takes these words personally. After the party, Jordan goes to the barn and there is a gunshot. Andrew feels he has failed, but Tess tells him he has done his best. Monica arrives as the vet and starts to talk to Jimmy about his sorrow. Finding an earring belong to Donna, Molly is convinced that Jordan was having an affair with her. Monica tells Andrew he must tell Molly the truth. Not wanting to confess his failure, Andrew refuses. Later, Monica reminds him of his duties as an angel and as a servant of God. Andrew goes to Molly and reveals himself as an angel, how much he had to live for and how God loved him. Guest stars: Julie White, Bobby Edner and Kevin Kilner
122	6	"The Occupant"	Larry Peerce	Jon Andersen	October 31, 1999	606	17.74
One Halloween night, Monica, Tess and Andrew attend to a spiritual battle at Salt Lake City's Mercy Hospital. The ambulance brings in Lonnie, a deranged and suicidal homeless man. Looking to Tess, who was Lonnie's Sunday school teacher, Andrew finds out that Lonnie has had problems with guilt and shame, following a prank that went wrong, drugs, and being involved in the occult. Andrew realizes that Lonnie is possessed by a demon who calls himself "Gregory". Monica pleads with Lonnie to ask God for help, and ER head Duncan later helps Lonnie, which gives him the strength to ask for God's help and forgiveness. Guest stars: Casey Biggs, Tara Strong, Titus Welliver and Shia LaBeouf
123	7	"Voice of an Angel"	Peter H. Hunt	Glenn Berenbeim	November 14, 1999	607	19.69
In New York City, Tess and Monica are enjoying the music of some street performers, but when Monica tries to join in, Tess points out that singing is not one of her gifts. Monica replies that she has always prayed for a beautiful singing voice, and when she hears one echoing down the halls of Carnegie Hall, she believes God is finally answering her prayer. Much to her disappointment, Monica finds that the voice belongs to a rude British orphan girl named Alice. Alice is in New York to perform in a vocal contest with her choir, and is her assignment. Tess tells Monica she is to give Alice "A Singing Lesson". When Monica later hears the sweet notes from this sour child, she becomes jealous and walks off the assignment, and ends up in a karaoke bar. When she asks for coffee and is served Irish coffee, her inhibitions decrease as she drinks more and more. Despite Andrew's protests, she performs Danny Boy. Taunting a policeman, Monica is arrested and put in jail, where she meets a girl named Ivy. Abused by her father, Ivy is being held for stealing a CD. Through Ivy, Monica learns what God has been trying to teach her: she shouldn't try to take what doesn't belong to her. Monica prays for forgiveness, and after receiving a rebuke and scolding from Tess, returns to her assignment. As Monica begins her search for Alice, Andrew tells her that Alice is not an orphan and her father is still alive. Monica then arrives to tell Alice the truth: she is an angel, and that she has been sent to give her a singing lesson. Monica tells Alice that she has been singing to the wrong father, who abandoned her and doesn't deserve her. Instead, she should sing to her Heavenly Father, who loves her and will never leave her. Guest stars: Charlotte Church and N'Sync
124	8	"The Whole Truth and Nothing But..."	Sandor Stern	Teleplay by : Brian Bird; Story by : Kenny Solms & Brian Bird	November 21, 1999	608	15.72
According to Tess, Liz Bradley, editor of the Chicago Daily Guardian, is suffering from a contagious disease: cynicism. She is Monica's assignment. Liz is impressed with Monica and hires her, assigning her possible shady dealings between Mayor Hunley and some Taiwanese officials. Liz teams Monica with Lauren, the Guardian's star reporter who is also Liz's younger sister. Lauren feels Liz is too obsessed with her work, and the sisters fight frequently. When Monica returns with a story about a Taiwanese dance troupe, Liz is furious. Wanting to help Monica, Ray tails the Mayor seeing him entering a hotel room, he gives Monica the tip, and when she arrives, Andrew tells Monica that the mayor has died of a heart attack. When Liz finds out, she encourages Monica to stall the police and look for the story. Monica finds a glass with lipstick on it along with a manuscript. Lauren arrives on the scene soon after the police to "help" Monica. Liz hopes to headline the morning paper with a story about the "mystery lover", but Monica and Lauren object. Ray learns that Lauren's fingerprints are on the manuscript, but Monica remembers that Lauren never touched the manuscript and Lauren is the mystery woman. Monica confronts Lauren and urges her to come forward with the truth. Lauren refuses, not willing to hurt the mayor's family or endure the scorn of her sister. Liz insists that Monica tell her who the mystery woman is and Monica tells her the truth. Liz, angry with Lauren publishes the story, humiliating her. Ray investigates further, and a furious Liz fires him. Monica reveals herself, telling Liz to speak the truth in love. Liz realizes she has been using the truth for harm. She finds Ray, apologizes and rehires him, and tearfully admits to Lauren that she failed to be a friend to her. Lauren forgives her sister, and they make amends. Guest stars: Marcia Cross and Ann Jillian
125	9	"Then Sings My Soul"	Peter H. Hunt	Burt Pearl & Glenn Berenbeim	November 28, 1999	610	18.52
Andrew gives a tour of Taffy Town to a group of young schoolchildren. Taffy Town seems like a wonderful place, as evidenced in the video hosted by founder Uncle Dudley, but Tess reveals that when he died five years ago, the spirit of Taffy Town died with him. Monica meets Bo, son of Uncle Dudley and current owner of Taffy Town. Bo has found it difficult to live up to his father's image and hates being saddled with the responsibility. To make matters worse, Taffy Town is losing money, and Bo hires Monica as an efficiency expert to figure out why. Monica starts to interview the employees and finds the older staff to be hardworking, yet lacking in spirit. Monica learns from Clarence, a blind taste tester, that Dudley bequeathed the factory to Bo, with the stipulation that he could sell it in five years time if he wanted. Dudley hoped that Bo would love Taffy Town as much as he did. Monica reports that the problem is not a lack of efficiency, but a lack of heart. Bo uses this as a justification and announces this to the stunned employees. Monica convinces Bo to give her until the end of the day to change his mind, and Bo agrees. Monica prays for guidance, and Clarence remembers that Dudley used to pray all the time, wondering if that is what has been missing. Monica enlists the help of Tess who brings in a band to lift the spirit of the workers. The workers sing To God Be the Glory and I Have Decided to Follow Jesus. While the workers are praising God, Monica appeals to Bo to come out the office, but he refuses, pointing out that her time is almost up. Just then, an explosion rocks the factory. Monica reveals herself, and Tess makes Bo watch the rest of the video. Dudley reminds Bo of all the gifts God has given and to thank him. Later, Tess finishes the song at the opening ceremony of the newly rebuilt Taffy Town. Guest stars: Greg Evigan, Louie Anderson, Jennifer Holliday, Jo Dee Messina and Keb' Mo'
126	10	"The Christmas Gift"	Stuart Margolin	Teleplay by : Ken LaZebnik; Story by : Ken LaZebnik & Patrice Chanel	December 12, 1999	611	18.06
Robert and Brianna return to their impoverished hometown of East St. Louis for the Thanksgiving holiday. This tradition annoys Brianna, who wishes that Robert's widowed mother LaBelle would come to their safe and wealthy neighborhood instead. When a homeless man named Gabe is drawn to the music, where Tess and Monica are seen, out of sight, that Robert plays on his trumpet. LaBelle welcomes him in for dinner, much to Brianna's chagrin. Though money is very tight, Robert buys Labelle a cell phone for safety reasons. She calls him late one night to tell him vandals have broken a window in her home, so he promptly leaves for East St. Louis. Hours later, Andrew, a policeman arrives to inform Brianna that Robert was killed by being carjacked just a mile down the road. Though finances are dwindling, Brianna sells most of her possessions at a yard sale. This sale does not raise enough money to keep the house, however, so Brianna moves into a motel. Monica finally convinces Brianna to go to LaBelle for help, and agrees to temporarily move back to East St. Louis. The new living situation grates on both women, who blame each other for Robert's death. Tess calms LaBelle, reminding her that a large part of Robert lives on in Brianna. Monica reveals herself to a desperate Brianna and tells her God loves her. As the women reconcile, Gabe, the homeless man is revealed as the angel Gabriel who plays Away in a Manger on Robert's rescued trumpet. Guest stars: Ossie Davis and Ruby Dee
127	11	"Millennium"	Robert J. Visciglia, Jr.	Martha Williamson	January 2, 2000	612	21.89
At a New Year's Eve party, the angels meet a woman named Angela who rejects her boyfriend's marriage proposal because she is afraid of commitment. This fear stems from her childhood, when her father abandoned her. She agrees to go to her childhood home with Monica and Andrew, to dig up a time capsule she buried with her father. The next morning they arrive at the house which is now a bed and breakfast run by Tess. When they dig up the time capsule, Angela learns the truth about her father. Guest star: Ann-Margret
128	12	"With God as My Witness"	Stuart Margolin	R.J. Colleary	January 9, 2000	609	18.87
Trying to warn the construction site project manager, Carl of potential safety hazards, Jim Sullivan instead incurs his wrath and is fired. Tess reminds Monica that humans value themselves for what they do, rather than who they are. The angels must keep Jim from making any more desperate decisions. Unable to find construction work, Jim takes a low paying job as a limousine driver and worries that he will be unable to support his wife and two daughters. As the bills pile up, he makes a desperate decision. Taking his co-worker's advice, he decides to drive a questionable but generously tipping client around for the evening. Monica, the limo dispatcher warns against it, but the promise of quick cash is too tempting to refuse. Jim's client, Stuart Deane, is secretive about his business and appointments. Jim learns too much when Deane leaves their last stop firing a gun. Deane tips Jim handsomely and threatens his family if he goes to the police, and leaves. Jim remains silent until Monica arrives with an undercover officer and questions him. He refuses to talk to the agents but when Deane threatens his family, and Monica says to him, "Evil thrives when good men do nothing", she says it is time to tell your wife, and he agrees to testify. Tess outlines their arrangements. Most painfully they will have to say goodbye to Shawn's father, Charles who lives in the local nursing home. Andrew agrees to take good care of Charles. Shawn is upset when Jim admits he knew about Deane's reputation and destroyed the family's identity and safety for some extra cash. Tess reminds her of her marriage vows and the importance of forgiveness. Despondent, Jim believes he has lost his family. Monica then reveals herself and tells him that God will be a good shepherd as promised, faithfully leading him and his family through the valleys ahead. Monica shows Jim two newspaper stories; the first about Deane, the second about the lives saved at the construction site as a result of his recommendations. Now inspired, Jim visits Deane in prison, who again threatens him if he testifies. Jim tells Deane that even though his family will go into hiding, they will always have their identities as God's children. Jim gives Deane a Bible and suggests he read it starting with Psalm 23. As the reconciled family prepare for their new life, they are ecstatic that Tess has arranged a new identity for Charles, Shawn's father, who is going to be with them as well. Guest star: Stuart Margolin
129	13	"A House Divided"	Bethany Rooney	Rosanne Welch	January 23, 2000	613	16.11
Andrew, on assignment as a sixth-grade teacher, presides over a parent-teacher night at the school. A simple game the parents play turns into a scene when a divorced couple, Martin and Janet, argue over who better knows their son, John. 11-year-old John is humiliated in front of his classmates, but quietly hides his grief. As Andrew builds a relationship with John, he begins to understand the tug of war that is John's life. John lives with his mother and her new husband, Phil, and spends the weekends with his father. When Martin and Janet have to deal with each other, their communication is riddled with subversion and insults. One weekend, while John and Martin eat pizza at a local restaurant, they run into Andrew and Monica. She describes herself as an "advocate" – someone who helps people. When Janet arrives at the restaurant to deliver John's homework, another fight erupts and John decides he would like to enlist Monica's services to help him divorce his parents. Shocked, Andrew insists that what John really needs is a break from his parents, so they spend the day at a museum. At first, John feel better but when he returns home to find his parents in the midst of another fight, his desire for a divorce becomes stronger. The next day, a process server delivers a subpoena to Janet and Martin. At the courthouse, Tess presides as the trial judge. After it becomes clear that Janet and Martin cannot control their outbursts, Tess orders a time out. Andrew agrees to let John stay with him for a few days, but he must find an apartment. At the next court date, Monica takes the parent's depositions. Finally, Tess wants to hear from John himself but he refuses to testify, afraid that Tess will make him choose one parent over another. Tess calls a recess and orders the parents to her chambers. Tess tells them the story of King Solomon, and that parents shouldn't make their children suffer. Meanwhile, Monica and Andrew talk to an upset John. After a pep talk, John is ready to take the stand. He tells his parents he is afraid that they will stop loving him the way they stopped loving each other, and Janet and Martin commit to working on the relationship. Guest star: Judith Hoag
130	14	"Buy Me a Rose"	Peter H. Hunt	R.J. Colleary	February 6, 2000	614	19.82
Greg and Ellen Sawyer have been married for 19 years. Tess's and Monica's assignment is to make sure they stay married well past 20. Greg, a successful Portland developer is often too preoccupied with his work to notice Ellen. But when securing a business deal takes precedence over their 20th wedding anniversary celebration, Ellen begins to question their marriage. When Monica, working as Ellen's assistant helps her go through some old boxes, Ellen discovers love letters from an old boyfriend, a musician named Denny. Meanwhile, Andrew refuses to sell Greg a lucrative piece of property. In the ensuing negotiations Greg fails to notice, when Ellen leaves to celebrate their wedding anniversary alone in their cabin in the woods. Instead of going to the cabin, Ellen detours to Oregon City, hoping to see Denny. Stopping off at a hotel, she meets Tess, who counsels her to return to her husband. After the show, two catch up enthusiastically after the show. The next morning Greg learns that Ellen never made it to the cabin and spent the night at the hotel. Ellen and Denny walk through the park discussing Ellen's failing marriage. Though he still loves her, Denny tells her to return to Greg and work things out. Ellen agrees. Greg arrives to find Ellen and Denny kissing goodbye. Greg is furious and punches Denny. Later Greg and Ellen have it out and she explains her feelings of abandonment. Greg argues that he works hard to provide and make a leisurely future possible. Monica reveals herself to Ellen and tells her that love is a choice, not a feeling and a commitment God is calling her to make. At the same time Greg intends to punch Denny again. Instead, he finds Andrew and once again tries to secure the property. Andrew points out the absurdity of working a business deal while his marriage is crumbling. Andrew tells Greg that he is an angel with a gift from God. God has given Greg the property, but with this gift comes the responsibility to love and take care of it, much like the gift of marriage. When Greg finds Denny he asks him the secret to keeping Ellen happy. Denny tells him that Ellen likes roses and love letters. Greg returns home with a bouquet of flowers and tries to open the channels of communication with Ellen. As Ellen and Greg recommit to their marriage, they remember to make each other their first priority. Guest stars: Kathy Baker, Michael Nouri and Kenny Rogers
131	15	"Life Before Death"	Martha Mitchell	Glenn Berenbeim	February 13, 2000	616	19.29
Monica is ecstatic to be assigned to her beloved Ireland, where she first set foot on earth. Her assignment is a group of teens from Northern Ireland, whom she hopes to persuade to come to the United States through a program called Program Children. However, the group is made up of both Catholics and Protestants. Recently a peace treaty was signed, but peace is dependent on the youth of Ireland. Monica interviews teenagers for the program, and finds bitterness and prejudices on both sides. Monica is extremely discouraged, but Tess reassures her that peace can be reached. Monica reveals herself and tells them that the Father wants them to lead the generation into peace. Tommy and Rose accept the words of wisdom and finally each other's love. Under the direction of Tess, Andrew and Monica, the teens begins to slowly begin to cooperate on remodeling a house.
132	16	"A Perfect Game"	Martha Mitchell	Burt Pearl	February 20, 2000	615	18.16
At the Cherry Lanes Bowl-A-Rama, the angels meet Ziggy, the unhappy owner of the alley. Though it's the angels' "night off," Monica takes an immediate interest in helping Ziggy, who is too proud to ask for help from anyone. Darrell, a security guard, arrives to celebrate his birthday. Darrell and Ziggy, once best friends, haven't spoken in years. Tess counsels Renee and Warren, who argue about whom to invite to their wedding. Monica questions Ziggy about her anger towards Darrell and suggests she forgive him. Contemplating this, Ziggy makes adjustments to his lane. Meanwhile, Warren suggests eloping and Renee is clearly hurt. Darrell begins to bowl strike after strike but the angels are skeptical. Sweeny, the snack bar waitress tells Tess about the history of Ziggy and Darrell's relationship. When Renee complains about Warren, Ziggy warns her to get out of the relationship. After Ziggy humiliates Darrell, Monica reveals to Ziggy that Darrell has lung cancer. Ziggy tries to apologize to him, but he walks out. Monica then finds Ziggy weeping and reveals herself. Monica tells her that she can learn a lesson from bowling: you always get a second chance to make it right. Guest star: Sharon Gless
133	17	"Here I Am"	Joel J. Feigenbaum	Ken LaZebnik	February 27, 2000	617	15.64
Monica, Tess, and Andrew find themselves in a New York art museum, each assigned to a different individual. Keeping an eye on children is Bud, an older security guard whose retirement begins at the end of the day. Bud has emotional walls between himself and the rest of the world, and it is Tess's job to knock them down. Monica is talking to Antonio, an artist who despises his displayed painting. In another wing, Andrew has revealed himself as the angel of death to Constance, a woman who has just discovered she has cancer and is trying to determine what she has contributed to the world. Tess discovers that Bud is obsessed with a painting of a girl holding flowers. Antonio, about to destroy the painting is stopped by Monica who reveals herself and tells Antonio that God inspired him to paint what he did, though His purpose may not seem clear. Constance realizes that her son is the gift she has given to the world. As they approach the painting of the girl with the flowers, they see an older woman with a young girl who strongly resembles the one in the picture. It turns out that the older woman posed for the painting when she was young, and Bud's friend on canvas becomes the living friend Tess spoke of. A now happy Bud does his last closing of the museum, and the angels disappear. Guest star: Ed Asner
134	18	"Bar Mitzvah"	Jeff Kanew	Allen Estrin & Joseph Telushkin	March 12, 2000	618	19.30
Ross Berger, an 83-year-old owner of a successful chain of exercise gyms, credits his recovery from a stroke to his own physical strength and will. He considers himself a self-made man and religion is for the weak. Ross's son on the other hand, Alan, is a man of faith in God and a well respected college professor who deeply values his Jewish heritage. Alan's son Aaron, who is preparing for his bar mitzvah, admires his grandfather's physical strength more than his father's spiritual faith. Monica and Tess agree to help Ross produce an exercise video for stroke victims, while Andrew tutors Aaron in Hebrew, teaching him the new meaning of the bar mitzvah: the acceptance of his new responsibilities as a man of God. Alan's wife Connie is worried about Ross' influence on Aaron, but is even more concerned about Alan's dizzy spells. When he receives the news that he is dying from a rapidly growing brain tumor, he confides in Ross. Despite Alan's pleas, Ross pledges to find better doctors and newer treatments. Soon after, Alan collapses and is taken to the hospital. Even while ill, he is concerned with Aaron's bar mitzvah. Ross agrees and prays with Alan. When Aaron sees this, he believes his grandfather has weakened and has given up trying to save Alan. When Alan dies, Aaron is angry, both at God and at Ross for not saving Alan, and refuses to proceed with the ceremony, Monica reveals herself and encourages Ross to humble himself before God and accept his love. The next day, the rabbi announces that there will be no bar mitzvah. Ross then steps forward to state his desire to be bar mitzvah'd. Ross tells Aaron he was wrong, and that Alan was right all along. Grandfather and grandson join each other in reading the Torah, embracing their Jewish faith and heritage. Guest star: Kirk Douglas
135	19	"True Confessions"	Larry Peerce	Brian Bird	March 19, 2000	619	17.04
As Tess and Monica discuss the end of winter, Tess reminds Monica that in some places, winter lasts all year long. One such place is the Kewanee Women's Correctional Facility where Monica's assignment, Carla Robinson is doing 25 years to life for murder. Monica joins the prison staff as a social worker and begins to implement a prison theatre program. With Tess' help as a prison guard, Monica is able to get a small group of the prisoners to open up about themselves and their crimes. Carla though claims to be innocent and spends her time trying to get a pardon. Andrew is a hospice nurse to Santos Gonzales, the father of Orbie, the man Carla was convicted of murdering. Even after several years, Santos is still bitter about Orbie's death. At the prison, Monica chooses the play Agnes of God for the women to perform for the rest of the inmates. As rehearsals commence, Monica begins to believe that Carla is innocent. Andrew tells Monica she is guilty, as he was there. Tess tells Monica that Carla isn't simply lying, she actually believes she is innocent. As Santos gets closer to death, Andrew pleads with him to pray for peace rather than vengeance against Carla. Monica begins to make progress with Carla, learning about her suicide attempts and the daughter she hasn't seen in years. As Carla gives her version of the events, and before Monica can challenge it, Carla receives news that her conviction has been overturned. Though upset, Carla finishes the show and is soon released from prison. When Santos hears of Carla's pardon, he insists on asking her forgiveness for all the years he'd cursed her. Carla meets her daughter Meredith at the local diner where Tess "moonlights" as a waitress. Andrew arrives with Santos, but Carla is too overwhelmed to speak with him. In the storeroom, Monica reveals to Carla she is an angel and helps Carla pray for the ability to remember the truth. Carla finally remembers that she pulled the trigger in a drug-induced haze. She begs for God's, and then Santos' forgiveness, and tells Meredith that their life together will be postponed, as she must first go to the court and tell the truth. Guest star: Viveka Davis
136	20	"Quality Time"	Peter H. Hunt	Rosanne Welch	April 2, 2000	620	17.10
Toni Cozzi organizes her life the same way she runs her family: in adherence to a rigid schedule. As Monica and Tess are watched invisible, Toni prepares for her day, completing simple tasks with perfect timing that is a way to keep her family safe. That family includes patriarch Paul, an idea man who is always preoccupied, Amy a high school volleyball player, and Angelo the youngest, whose specialty is playing the tuba and always getting into mischief. The family is just days away from the opening of their pizza parlor "Paul and Toni's Perfect Pizza." Monica is hired as chef and Andrew as handyman. As Monica begins making the pizza, it becomes apparent that Toni won't reveal the secret of her family sauce, not even to her own family! At the same time, Toni worries about Amy's increasing appetite and water intake, and about her general moodiness, scared that Amy is getting into drugs. When she collapses on the volleyball court, Amy is diagnosed with juvenile diabetes. Tess, the nurse, teaches the family about the condition. Toni immediately takes charge, planning to beat the disease with perfect scheduling. Amy insists that none of her friends know about this, especially her boyfriend Matt. While Amy recuperates, everyone pitches in to do her duties. Monica is reassigned to be the waitress and Andrew becomes the chef. When Amy comes home, Toni wakes up in the middle of every night to make sure she has her shot, but Angelo is squeamish and can't help. At the next game, Angelo tells a shocked Matt about the diabetes. The coach tells Amy that in light of her condition, her wants Toni to travel with the team. Amy is horrified and decides to quit. When Toni learns that Paul has picked up the wrong uniforms and Amy hasn't taken her latest shot, she breaks down. Frustrated, Amy leaves to find Matt. When Matt tells Amy he knows about her diabetes, Amy gives herself a shot to show herself how easy it is, but she is not careful with the levels. Upset that Amy hid this from him, Matt breaks up with her. As Matt leaves, Amy becomes very sick. Monica finds her and takes her to the hospital. When Paul and Toni hear the news, they leave the restaurant for the hospital, accidentally leaving an apron on the stove. Soon a fire starts, and Andrew arrives to rescue Angelo and to douse the flames. First Paul and Toni begin to fight then Angelo and Amy, each blaming the other for the setback. In the midst of the chaos Monica reveals herself, saying that they need to make God a family member, and the first guest in the new restaurant. The family prays, committing themselves to God. Guest star: Robin Bartlett
137	21	"Living the Rest of My Life"	Tim Van Patten	Teleplay by : Della Reese & Burt Pearl; Story by : Della Reese Lett	April 9, 2000	621	17.60
Abby is a 71-year-old widow who spends her days watching soap operas and her nights doting on her overly attached son Phillip and his wife Judith. Monica and Tess's assignment is to help cut the apron strings between mother and son. When Monica arrives at Abby's door to collect clothes for the "Living the Rest of My Life" Retirement Community Fundraiser, Abby is skeptical. Later, when Tess tells her about the activities that take place at "Living the Rest of My Life", Abby agrees to a visit to see for herself. Abby is excited to find many other seniors who keep busy with all sorts of activities, though she tries to mask her enthusiasm. She meets Ramone, a young graffiti artist who serves mandatory community service hours by helping Andrew the Community's handyman, paint the hallways. Abby also meets Lois, a retired artist and widow, who hides in her apartment, angrily refusing to socialize with other community members. Abby uses Lois and Ramone as reasons why she should not move here, but her real feelings are apparent when she returns a few days later with her treasured pecan pie. When Phillip realizes where his mother has been spending her time, he insists that she put any thoughts of moving out of her head, reminding her of how much he needs her. But when he forgets her birthday, she decides that it is time to move. Phillip and Judith arrive for a visit, and Phillip desperately tries to sweet talk Abby into leaving. She is settling in, however, and is unwilling to return, paying for the first month's rent with some cash she saved away. Phillip is angry and storms out, while Judith unbeknownst to Phillip gives Abby her checkbook which Phillip had been holding for her. Meanwhile Lois and Ramone argue about art and insult each other. Abby comforts Lois by writing a check for one of her paintings. In turn, Lois apologizes to Ramone and revalidates his work. Lois later reclaims the painting, announcing that the check bounced. Phillip then admits he depleted Abby's life savings by making bad investments. Abby is shocked but forgives Phillip and moves back home. But when Abby sees Phillip stealing cash from her personal belongings, she can no longer make excuses for him. Tess reveals herself and says that God understands her situation. He lets his children face the consequences of their actions, and she must do the same for Phillip. Abby insists that Phillip pay back all the money he lost, and tells him he cannot move in until he pulls his life together. Abby prepares to move out until Ramone announces that Lois' artwork is worth a fortune. Lois then offers to pay Abby's rent so that she can be a part of the family at "Living the Rest of My Life". Guest star: Cicely Tyson
138	22	"Stealing Hope"	Peter H. Hunt	Jason Jersey	April 23, 2000	622	15.71
Ricky Hauk is being laid off from his job at Al's Gas Station. He vents his frustration by writing poetry on the bathroom wall, quickly erasing it before it can be preserved for posterity. Monica is hired to take inventory, and she encourages Ricky to pursue his writing. When Shelley, a local college student arrives with her snobbish boyfriend Marshall, Ricky is immediately smitten. When Marshall notices Ricky's college hat, he accuses him of being a poseur. As Marshall and Shelley leave, Ricky discovers she has dropped her school I.D. Later, Ricky agrees to help his little brother Joey win the invention convention at the college. When Shelley returns to retrieve her I.D., Ricky claims to be a student of the college. Shelley suggests he enroll in her writing class. Ricky agrees to check it out however his mother Ellen is frustrated to find out about the class and says they need the money to make ends meet. The next day Ricky is resigned to apply for work at Taco Town. Instead, he goes to Shelley's class, taught by Andrew, where he sees Tess, another student. Andrew's teaching is inspiring, but Ricky is scared off by Marshall. Back at the station, Ricky writes another poem on the wall. Monica offers him a blank notebook to write in, but when he tries it, he has a flashback to his childhood: his father abused him for writing on his racing form. Andrew catches Ricky trying to attend class. Andrew agrees to let him sit for one week, but then he must enroll. During class, Andrew asks Marshall to read a poem and Ricky is shocked to hear his poem – copied from the bathroom wall. Defeated, Ricky swipes Marshall's rear-view mirror. Meanwhile, Monica helps Joey finish his invention: a forgetting machine. Ricky complains to Monica about Marshall's plagiarism. Monica tells Ricky to use it as an encouraging sign that his writing is good. At the convention Marshall, one of the judges recognizes his rear-view mirror on Joey's invention and fights with Ricky, but Andrew breaks it up. Ricky accuses Marshall of stealing his poem. Tess comes to Ricky's defense and says she knows who really stole the car. In an empty classroom, Monica reveals herself and tells Ricky he has put up a wall to block out the past, but it has also blocked out his dreams. God wants him to tear down this wall and write his words down so he can be free. Later Andrew asks Marshall to recite the poem, but he can't; Ricky recites it on the spot. Ellen is moved by Ricky's poem about his father and asks him for forgiveness for remaining in an abusive situation. Ellen asks Ricky to write down the poem for her, and he agrees. The angels watch as the newly restored family walk arm in arm. Guest stars: Pedro Pascal and Alex D. Linz
139	23	"Monica's Bad Day"	Tim Van Patten	R.J. Colleary	April 30, 2000	623	16.64
Late one night in New York City, a desperate Monica hails a cab and demands that Merl, the driver, take her to the Queensborough Bridge; she says if she doesn't reach the bridge by 10 PM someone will die. Flynn Hodge, the proprietor of Flynn's Bar and Grill, also hops in the cab, claiming Monica hasn't paid her dinner bill. Tess and Andrew watch from the curb, noting that Monica is having a really bad day. In the cab, Monica tells the men that she is an angel and they think she is crazy. Monica reminds Flynn that it was something he did earlier in the day that led to this desperate situation. Earlier that morning, Flynn rushed to the Bank to appeal a foreclosure on his restaurant. Due to Monica's poor parallel parking job, he misses his meeting, and despite Monica's apologies, he yells at her. Tess counsels Monica to forgive him then rather than harbor her own anger and take it out on someone else. Meanwhile, Andrew counsels Simon to meet his estranged son Russell at Flynn's restaurant. Later, while Tess and Monica each lunch at Flynn's, Monica, still in a foul mood drops Flynn's cell phone in the fish tank to cease its annoying beeping. As a result, Flynn misses an important call from the bank. Flynn then yells at Ronnie, the dishwasher who spends his spare time searching for his missing brother. The cycle continues as Ronnie yells at the waitress, who yells at the bartender, who yells at the customers, including Simon and Russell who refuse to reconcile. Ultimately the bank loan officer visits the restaurant and finds the customers and staff to be so unfriendly, he refuses to reverse the foreclosure. Believing all is lost, Flynn rants at Monica, who is so overwhelmed that she faints. While she recovers, Tess allows Monica to see what would have happened had she not given in to her anger. After seeing what could have been, Monica understands that Wendy has gone to the bridge because Flynn was not able to comfort her. As it nears 10 PM, the cab arrives at the bridge and Flynn and Monica find Wendy about to jump. Monica reveals to Wendy that she is an angel and apologizes to her for her role in the chain of events, reminding her of God's love. Flynn also apologizes for being rude to Wendy, offering to be a much needed friend. On the way back to the restaurant Flynn recognizes Ronnie's missing brother and unites the two. Andrew persuades Simon to reconcile with Russell. When Flynn announces a celebration to close the restaurant, Wendy offers to help financially. Finally, the angels rejoice at God's ability to put right what went wrong. Guest stars: John Ratzenberger, Howard Hesseman, Jay Patterson, Steven Gilborn, Kathie Lee Gifford and Doug E. Doug
140	24	"A Clown's Prayer"	Larry Peerce	Glenn Berenbeim	May 7, 2000	624	14.99
Monica and Tess laugh as they look at themselves in the mirrors of the fun house at the Grazeldi circus. Tess reminds Monica that, like their distorted mirror images, the circus is all about illusion. Davey Tucker seems like the luckiest boy in the world because he lives at the circus, yet he dreams of being a regular boy. His father, a dwarf named Leroy, works as a circus clown. Since Wally Grazeldi is unable to pay the performers, many are quitting the show. But Leroy steadfastly remains, and Tess, a talent scout offers the talents of Monica as a clown and Andrew as a ringmaster. What Wally really needs is a human cannonball. He asks Leroy, but Leroy refuses, as he suffers from claustrophobia. As Monica is coached in clowning by Leroy, she begins to learn more about the Tuckers. When Andrew comes by the school, Davey says Andrew is his father. Later Andrew talks to him about his lie. When he talks to Davey's teacher, Leroy is later laughed at and ridiculed when leaving school. Andrew reveals that if Leroy performs the stunt, he won't live through it. Monica reveals herself and tells Leroy that he is made in the image of God who made him, and God seeks out his wayward children and Leroy needs to do the same for Davey. Monica and Andrew are proud to see that Tess instead performs the stunt. Guest stars: Phil Fondacaro, Jeremy James Kissner and Susan Ruttan
141	25	"Mother's Day"	Victor Lobl	Martha Williamson	May 14, 2000	625	16.95
Celine sits at the grave of her friend Petey Carmichael, giving him an update of things that have happened since his death. (Note: As depicted in the season 5 episode "Psalm 151" (1998)) She tells him that his mother hasn't been doing too well since he left. She refuses to compose music and drinks frequently. Celine asks Petey if he can send some angels to help her. Tess and Monica reminisce about Audrey. Tess says Audrey hasn't forgiven them for helping her say goodbye to Petey. Since Audrey refuses to see Tess, Monica and Andrew, another angel, Emma, is assigned to Audrey. Emma, a very fastidious angel, rents a room from Audrey, and begins spring cleaning the house. Meanwhile, Andrew is assigned to Liz, a tough and demanding talk show host who has lost a child many years ago. Andrew proposes a series of radio shows on addiction. At the same time, Monica begins to appear in Audrey's dreams, repeating the phrase "That's what makes you strong", but she cannot remember how she knows the tune. As she sings, Emma quietly turns on the tape recorder. Later Celine tells Tess that her family is moving and she won't be able to take care of Audrey anymore. Tess reveals to Celine that she and Emma are angels and they'll have to work together to help Audrey. That night, Celine hears the recording and calls in to Liz's talk show about alcoholism in hopes of finding help for Audrey. Celine plays some of her song over the radio, but quickly hangs up when Audrey enters. Liz is shocked to hear the song. She wrote it years ago, singing it only to the child that she lost. Audrey chastises Celine for playing the song, sending her home in tears. Liz begins to ask her listeners about more information on Celine. Celine's father calls into the program and speaks to Liz. The next morning, Liz and Andrew arrive at Audrey's house and Liz tells Audrey she is her mother. Audrey wants nothing more to do with her, believing that Liz abandoned her years ago. Liz explains that her father kidnapped Audrey after they were divorced and she has been searching for her ever since. Nonetheless, Audrey is unable to forgive Liz for not being around to help her through Petey's death. Monica reveals to Audrey that she is an angel, assuring her that Petey is with God, and that she has to give God the pieces of her broken heart and He will restore her. Monica reminds her that sometimes God sends an angel and sometimes He sends a mother. Liz tells Audrey that she also is an alcoholic and knows what it is like to lose a child. She will help her on the difficult road ahead. As the angels watch, Liz and Audrey celebrate mother's day by singing a duet of "That's What Makes You Strong" at Petey's grave. Guest stars: Jean Stapleton, Naomi Judd and Wynonna Judd
142	26	"Pandora's Box"	Tim Van Patten	Story by : Donna Rice Hughes & Daniel H. Forer; Teleplay by : Daniel H. Forer	May 21, 2000	626	17.33
The Radcliff family is a paradox of centuries. Mother Kate lives in the 19th century, running an antique shop and avoiding technology as much as possible. Father, Charlie, lives in the 20th century with his widescreen TV and microwave. But Sarah, their 13-year-old daughter, and Millie, their kindergartner, live in the 21st century, relying on the Internet to help them with their school projects. One night, while researching Hawaii, Sarah stumbles onto a pornographic website. Charlie and Kate insist that she turn it off immediately, upset that this sort of material is so easily accessible. At the antique store, Kate meets Monica and they become fast friends. Meanwhile, Tess avoids Millie's questions about reproduction suggesting that Mom and Dad will want to give her those answers. Kiki, Sarah's world-wise pal, takes her to the cyber café run by Andrew. At work, Charlie's co-worker shows him some porn sites and Charlie is intrigued. And before he knows it, he has spent an hour surfing those sites. When his boss catches him, he is fired. Charlie tells Kate about being fired, but he lies, saying he was only on for a minute. Despite this, Kate insists on getting rid of the computer. Charlie offers it to Andrew, who rents it for the café. Charlie begins spending time there, preparing his resume. Sarah, furious that the computer is gone, spends time at Kiki's house surfing the web. They begin a chat with "Dean16" who sends them his picture, but as Sarah sends him her picture, we learn that he is actually much older. Tess brings Millie home from school and talks to Kate and Charlie about her questions. They agree to speak with her soon. When Kate talks to Monica about protecting her children from the Internet, Monica reminds her that it is more important to equip children with the tools they need to protect themselves. Meanwhile Sarah agrees to meet Dean face to face. Charlie admits his lie to Kate, telling her he cannot get the images out of his head. This further affects Kate's hatred of technology. Sarah meets Dean at the local park. At first, she is nervous that he is much older, but he sweet talks her into believing he is only 19, and she agrees to go back to his apartment. Monica and Andrew find Kate and Charlie, and reveal to them that they are angels, and tell them of the danger Sarah is in. At Dean's apartment, he slips some drugs into Sarah's drink, and becomes upset when she says she's not thirsty. As Dean moves to attack Sarah, Charlie and Andrew arrive. Dean attacks Andrew with a baseball bat, but is unable to stop him. In anger, Andrew smashes Dean's computer. Monica then delivers a message to the Radcliff family that they have been the victims of an evil force. She also tells them that the Internet is an exciting gift from God, but that like many of His gifts, it can be abused. That is why it is important to take precautions with the Internet. A few days later Sarah unveils a webpage for Kate's antique store, and Charlie decides to start his own business too: managing the cyber café. Guest stars: Christine Estabrook, Evan Rachel Wood and Gary Cole
