= Anita M. Cal =

American film director

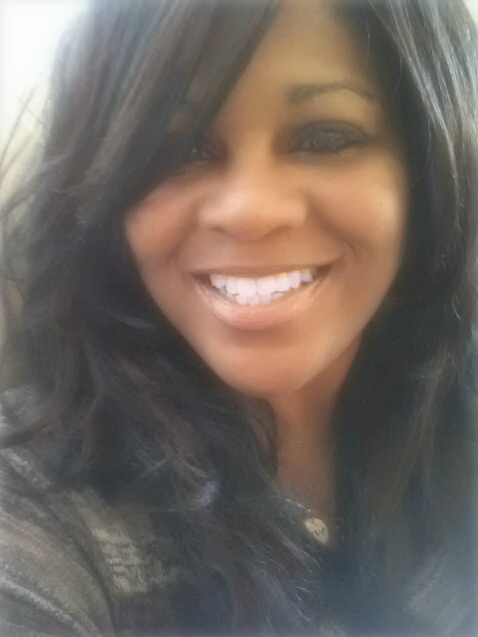
- Cal in 2015
- Born: Anita Marie Cal; October 14, 1966 (age 60); Seattle, Washington, U.S.
- Education: University of Washington (BA); California State University, Northridge (MA); Pepperdine University (EdD, PhD)
- Occupations: Author; Film producer; Screenwriter

Anita Marie Cal (born October 14, 1966) is an American author, screenwriter, film producer, and speaker best known for writing on the TBS family comedies, Tyler Perry's House of Payne and Tyler Perry's Meet the Browns. She was a screenwriter and producer of the comedy feature Kinfolks, developed by Showtime, starring Maia Campbell.

Cal won an Emmy Award as a producer on 10 Days in Watts, which was nominated for 5 Emmy Awards at the 75th Los Angeles Area Emmys in July 2024, winning 1 in the Culture/History Category for the "Legacy" episode. Cal wrote the 2015 historical novel, Eighth Wonder: The Thomas Bethune Story, the true story of a slave born blind, feeble, and left for dead who began playing Mozart at the age of three. The debut novel was awarded a SELF-e Highlighted Book by Library Journal and made available in libraries throughout the 50 states.

== Biography ==
Cal was born in Seattle, Washington, the daughter of Frances O. Cal, a manager of Yoruba descent who worked for the State Department of Transportation and Relocation, and Clarence A. Cal, Sr., an electrical engineer for the Boeing. Her parents, both Southern University alumni, are of African American origin, having migrated from Baton Rouge, Louisiana to Tacoma, Washington.

Cal attended Rainier Beach High School and transferred to Chief Sealth International High School. She was an off-guard for the city, district, and 5th in state championship basketball team graduating with honors in 1984 at the age of 17. She attended the University of Washington, and was a member of the EIP Early Identification Program for minorities who maintained a 3.27 GPA or higher, graduating in 1988 with a degree in Communications, Broadcasting. She studied screenwriting at Cal State University, Northridge, winning a Best Graduate Screenwriting Scholarship from Garry Marshall, landing a development deal with Showtime for "Kinfolks" before finishing the program and graduating with honors in 1998. She was co-writer/co-producer for the boxing drama Undercard, starring Wanda Sykes.

In 2015, Cal became a doctoral student at Pepperdine University, studying Organizational Leadership and Global Leadership with expected graduation dates of May 2017 and May 2018. Cal became a published scholar during her first semester of doctoral studies when the International Journal of Arts and Sciences selected her research with Dr. Leo Mallette on Celebrities and the United Nations: Leadership and referent power of global film ambassadors.
