= Lauren Berlant =

American academic and author (1957–2021)

- Born: October 31, 1957; Philadelphia, Pennsylvania, U.S.
- Died: June 28, 2021 (aged 63); Chicago, Illinois, U.S.
- Known for: Queer theory; heteronormativity; affect theory
- Awards: Guggenheim Fellowship

Academic background
- Education: Oberlin College (BA); Cornell University (MA, PhD)

Academic work
- Institutions: University of Chicago
- Doctoral students: Vaughn Rasberry

Lauren Gail Berlant (October 31, 1957 – June 28, 2021) was an American scholar and cultural theorist regarded as "one of the most esteemed and influential literary and cultural critics in the United States." Berlant was the George M. Pullman Distinguished Service Professor of English at the University of Chicago, where they taught from 1984 until 2021. Berlant wrote and taught about issues of intimacy and belonging in popular culture, in relation to the history and fantasy of citizenship.

Berlant wrote on public spheres as they affect worlds, where affect and emotion lead the way for belonging ahead of the modes of rational or deliberative thought. These attach strangers to each other and shape the terms of the state-civil society relation. Berlant's writings have been translated into at least eight languages.

== Early life and education ==
Berlant was born on October 31, 1957, in Philadelphia, Pennsylvania. Berlant grew up in Penn Valley, a suburb of Philadelphia, Pennsylvania. Berlant graduated with a BA in English from Oberlin College in 1979, then an MA from Cornell University in 1983, and finally a PhD from Cornell in 1985, after they had already begun teaching at the University of Chicago. (They said student loans obliged them to continue straight through school without a break that would have triggered loan repayment.) Berlant's dissertation was titled, Executing The Love Plot: Hawthorne and The Romance of Power (1985).

== Career ==
Berlant taught at the University of Chicago from 1984 to 2021, becoming the George M. Pullman Distinguished Service Professor of English. The university awarded them a Quantrell Award for Excellence in Undergraduate Teaching (1989), a Faculty Award for Excellence in Graduate Teaching and Mentoring (2005), and the Norman Maclean Faculty Award (2019).

Berlant's other honors included a Guggenheim Fellowship and, for their book Cruel Optimism, the René Wellek Prize of the American Comparative Literature Association and the Alan Bray Memorial Book Award from the Modern Language Association (MLA) for the best book in queer studies in literature or cultural studies. Berlant was elected to the American Academy of Arts and Sciences in 2018.

Berlant was a founding member of Feel Tank Chicago in 2002, a play on think tank. They worked with many journals, including (as editor) Critical Inquiry. They also edited Duke University Press's Theory Q series along with Lee Edelman, Benjamin Kahan, and Christina Sharpe.

== Works ==
Berlant was the author of a national sentimentality trilogy beginning with The Anatomy of National Fantasy: Hawthorne, Utopia, and Everyday Life (University of Chicago Press, 1991). Based on their dissertation, the book looks at the formation of national identity as the relations between modes of belonging mediated by the state and law; by aesthetics, especially genre; and by the everyday life of social relations, drawing on Nathaniel Hawthorne's work to illustrate these operations.

The Queen of America Goes to Washington City: Essays on Sex and Citizenship—the title essay winning the 1993 Norman Foerster Award for best essay of the year in American literature—introduced the idea of the "intimate public sphere" and looks at the production of politics and publicness since the Reagan era by way of the circulation of the personal, the sexual, and the intimate. In his review, José Muñoz described it as both intersectional, following Kimberlé Crenshaw, and "post-Habermassian", in the vein of work by Nancy Fraser and Berlant's frequent collaborator Michael Warner. Berlant's third book (though second in the trilogy), The Female Complaint: On the Unfinished Business of Sentimentality in American Culture was published by Duke University Press in 2008. The project initially began in the 1980s when Berlant noticed striking similarities in writing by Erma Bombeck and Fanny Fern, who skewered married life for women in nearly identical ways despite being separated by 150 years. Berlant pursued this mass cultural phenomenon of "women's culture" as an originating site of “intimate publics", threading the everyday institutions of intimacy, mass society, and, more distantly and ambivalently, politics through fantasies rather than ideology. Berlant took up this project by examining especially melodramas and their remade movies in the first part of the twentieth century, such as Show Boat, Imitation of Life, and Uncle Tom's Cabin.

Berlant's 2011 book, Cruel Optimism (Duke University Press) works its way across the U.S. and Europe to assess the level of contemporary crisis as neoliberalism wears away the fantasies of upward mobility associated with the liberal state. Cruel optimism manifests as a relational dynamic in which individuals create attachment as "clusters of promises" toward desired object-ideas even when they inhibit the conditions for flourishing and fulfilling such promises. Maintaining attachments that sustain the good life fantasy, no matter how injurious or cruel these attachments may be, allows people to make it through day-to-day life when the day-to-day has become unlivable. Elaborating on the specific dynamics of cruel optimism, Berlant emphasizes and maintains that it is not the object itself, but rather the relationship:

A relation of cruel optimism is a double-bind in which your attachment to an object sustains you in life at the same time as that object is actually a threat to your flourishing. So you can't say that there are objects that have the quality of cruelty or not cruelty, it's how you have the relationship to them. Like it might be that being in a couple is not a relation of cruel optimism for you, because being in a couple actually makes you feel like you have a grounding in the world, whereas for other people, being in a couple might be, on the one hand, a relief from loneliness, and on the other hand, the overpresence of one person who has to bear the burden of satisfying all your needs. So it's not the object that's the problem, but how we learn to be in relation.

An emphasis on the "present", which Berlant describes as structured through "crisis ordinariness", turns to affect and aesthetics as a way of apprehending these crises. Berlant suggests that it becomes possible to recognize that certain "genres" are no longer sustainable in the present and that new emergent aesthetic forms are taking hold that allow us to recognize modes of living not rooted in normative good life fantasies. Discussing crisis ordinariness, Berlant described it as their way "of talking about traumas of the social that are lived through collectively and that transform the sensorium to a heightened perceptiveness about the unfolding of the historical, and sometimes historic, moment (and sometimes publics organized around those senses, when experienced collectively)."

Berlant has edited books on Compassion (2004) and Intimacy (2001), which are interlinked with their seminal work in feminist and queer theory in essays like "What Does Queer Theory Teach Us About X?" (with Michael Warner, 1995), "Sex in Public" (with Michael Warner, 1998), Our Monica, Ourselves: Clinton and the Affairs of State (edited with Lisa Duggan, 2001), and Venus Inferred (with photographer Laura Letinsky, 2001).

== Style ==
Berlant's writing is semantically dense and formally experimental. They co-wrote with multiple other academics (collaboratively with Michael Warner and Kathleen Stewart, in dialog with Lee Edelman) and as part of collectives (including Chicago Cultural Studies Group in the early 1990s, The Late Liberalism Collective in the mid-00s, and Feel Tank Chicago for two decades). A large part of Berlant's critical and creative work in the last two decades of her/their life took the form of interviews and dialogs.

In 2019, Berlant published The Hundreds with Stewart, a collection of brief writing (a hundred words or a multiple of a hundred words) on ordinary encounters, applying affect theory to moments of unexamined daily life. In The New Yorker, Hua Hsu said the book "calls to mind the adventurous, hybrid style of Fred Moten (the book includes a brief poem by him), Maggie Nelson, or Claudia Rankine, all of whom bend available literary forms into workable vessels for new ideas."

== Death ==
Berlant was diagnosed with cancer in the summer of 2017, after which they collaborated with artist Riva Lehrer for a portrait in the latter's "Risk Series." The painting is now in the Collection of The National Portrait Gallery of the Smithsonian Museum. Berlant died at a Chicago hospice facility on June 28, 2021, at age 63. They are survived by their partner Ian Horswill. Some of Berlant's writing about cancer was published posthumously in The Affect Theory Reader 2.

Berlant's papers are held at the Feminist Theory Archive of the Pembroke Center for Teaching and Research on Women at Brown University. Berlant began donating them in 2014.

== Bibliography ==
=== Books authored ===
- The Anatomy of National Fantasy: Hawthorne, Utopia, and Everyday Life. University of Chicago Press. 1991. ISBN 978-0-2260-4377-7.
- Berlant, Lauren (1997). The Queen of America Goes to Washington City: Essays on Sex and Citizenship. Duke University Press. doi:10.1215/9780822398639. ISBN 978-0-8223-1924-5.
- Venus Inferred, with Laura Letinsky. University of Chicago Press. 2000. ISBN 978-0-2264-7345-1.
- Berlant, Lauren (2008). The Female Complaint: The Unfinished Business of Sentimentality in American Culture. Duke University Press. doi:10.1215/9780822389163. ISBN 978-0-8223-4202-1.
- Berlant, Lauren (2011). Cruel Optimism. Duke University Press. doi:10.1215/9780822394716. ISBN 978-0-8223-5111-5.
- Berlant, Lauren (2012). Desire/Love. Punctum Books. doi:10.21983/P3.0015.1.00. ISBN 978-0-6156868-7-5.
- Berlant, Lauren; Edelman, Lee (2014). Sex; or, the Unbearable, with Lee Edelman. Duke University Press. doi:10.1215/9780822377061. ISBN 978-0-8223-5594-6.
- Berlant, Lauren; Stewart, Kathleen (2019). The Hundreds, with Kathleen Stewart. Duke University Press. doi:10.1215/9781478003335. ISBN 978-1-4780-0288-8.
- Berlant, Lauren (2022). On The Inconvenience of Other People. Duke University Press. doi:10.1215/9781478023050. ISBN 978-1-4780-1845-2.

=== Edited ===
- The Black Public Sphere (as editorial member of the Black Public Sphere Collective), University of Chicago Press, 1997. ISBN 978-0-226-07192-3. https://archive.org/details/isbn_6369142017951
- Intimacy. University of Chicago Press. 2019. ISBN 978-0-2263-8443-6.
- Berlant, Lauren; Duggan, Lisa A., eds. (2001). Our Monica, Ourselves: The Clinton Affair and the National Interest, with Lisa Duggan. NYU Press. doi:10.18574/nyu/9780814739280.001.0001. ISBN 978-0-8147-9864-5.
- “Violence and Redemption,” (as editorial member of the Late Liberalism Collective), Public Culture 15.1 (2003). ISSN 0899-2363. https://muse.jhu.edu/issue/2467
- Compassion: Selected Papers from the English Institute. Routledge. 2004. ISBN 978-0-4159-7052-5.
- “On the Case,” two-volume special issue of Critical Inquiry, 33.4, 34.1 (2007). https://www.jstor.org/stable/10.1086/524831, https://www.jstor.org/stable/10.1086/526095
- “Comedy: An Issue,” with Sianne Ngai, Critical Inquiry, 43.2 (2017). https://www.jstor.org/stable/e26547680
- Berlant, Lauren, ed. (2019). Reading Sedgwick. Duke University Press. doi:10.1215/9781478005339. ISBN 978-1-4780-0631-2.

=== Articles and essays ===
- Lauren Berlant (1987). "Fancy-Work and Fancy Foot-Work: Motives for Silence in Washington Square". Criticism. 24 (4): 439–458. JSTOR 23110506.
  - Reprinted in: Reading with a Difference: Gender, Race, and Cultural Identity, eds. Arthur F. Marotti, Renata R. Mautner, Jo Dulan, and Suchitra Mathur (Wayne State UP, 1994), 63–82.
- Lauren Berlant (1988). "The Female Complaint". Social Text. 19/20 (19/20): 237–259. doi:10.2307/466188. JSTOR 466188.
- Lauren Berlant (1988). "Race, Gender, and Nation in The Color Purple ". Critical Inquiry. 14 (4): 831–859. doi:10.1086/448468. JSTOR 1343674.
  - Reprinted in: Alice Walker: Critical Perspectives Past and Present, eds. Henry Louis Gates Jr., and Anthony Appiah (Amistad, 1993).
  - Reprinted in: Alice Walker, Modern Critical Views, new edition, ed. Harold Bloom (Infobase, 2007).
  - Reprinted in: The Color Purple: New Critical Essays, ed. Mae G. Henderson (Oxford UP, 2020).
- Lauren Berlant (1989). "Fantasies of Utopia in The Blithedale Romance". American Literary History. 1 (1): 30–62. doi:10.1093/alh/1.1.30. JSTOR 489970.
  - Reprinted in: The American Literary History Reader, ed. Gordon Hutner (Oxford UP, 1995).
- Lauren Berlant (1989). "America, post-Utopia: Body, Landscape, and National Fantasy in Hawthorne's Native Land". Arizona Quarterly. 44 (4): 12–54. doi:10.1353/arq.1989.0008.
- Lauren Berlant (1989). "Rewriting the Medusa: Welty's 'Petrified Man'". Studies in Short Fiction. 26 (1): 59–70. doi:10.2307/303454. JSTOR 303454.
- Lauren Berlant (1991). "The Female Woman: Fanny Fern and the Form of Sentiment". American Literary History. 3 (3): 420–454. JSTOR 490011.
  - Reprinted in: The Culture of Sentiment: Race, Gender, and Sentimentality in Nineteenth-Century America, ed. Shirley Samuels (Oxford UP, 1993), 265–281.
- Lauren Berlant (1991). "National Brands/National Body: Imitation of Life". In Hortense J. Spillers (ed.). Comparative American Identities: Race, Sex, and Nationality in the Modern Text, Selected Papers from The English Institute. Routledge. pp. 110–140.
  - Reprinted in: The Phantom Public Sphere, ed. Bruce Robbins (University of Minnesota Press, 1993), 173–208
- Chicago Cultural Studies Group (1992). "Critical Multiculturalism". Critical Inquiry. 18 (3): 530–555. doi:10.1086/448644. JSTOR 1343815.
  - Reprinted in: Multiculturalism: A Reader, ed. David Theo Goldberg (Blackwell, 1994), 114–139.
- Lauren Berlant; Elizabeth Freeman (1992). "Queer Nationality". Boundary 2. 19 (1): 149–180. doi:10.2307/303454. JSTOR 303454.
  - Reprinted in: Fear of a Queer Planet, ed. Michael Warner (University of Minnesota Press, 1993), 193–229;
  - Reprinted in: The Material Queer: A Lesbigay Cultural Studies Reader, ed. Donald Morton (Westview Press, 1996).
  - Reprinted in: Radical Street Performance, ed. Jan Cohen-Cruz (Routledge, 1999), 133–142.
- Lauren Berlant (1993). "The Theory of Infantile Citizenship". Public Culture. 5 (3): 395–410. doi:10.1215/08992363-5-3-395.
  - Reprinted in: Nations and Nationalism, eds. Geoff Eley and Ronald Suny (Oxford UP, 1996).
  - Reprinted in: The Media Studies Reader, ed. Laurie Ouellette (Routledge, 2013).
- Lauren Berlant (1993). "The Queen of America Goes To Washington City (Harriet Jacobs, Frances Harper, Anita Hill)". American Literature. 65 (3): 549–574. doi:10.2307/2927393. JSTOR 2927393.
  - Reprinted in: Subjects and Citizens: Nation, Race, and Gender from Oroonoko to Anita Hill, ed. Cathy N. Davidson and Michael Moon (Duke UP, 1995).
  - Reprinted in: Feminisms, eds. Diana Price Herndl and Robin Warhol (Rutgers UP, 1997)..
- Lauren Berlant (1994). "America, 'Fat,' the Fetus". Boundary 2. 21 (3): 145–195. doi:10.2307/303603. JSTOR 303603.
  - Reprinted in: boundary2 anthology, ed. Paul Bové (Duke UP, 1998).
- Lauren Berlant; Michael Warner (1994). "False Choices". Radical Teacher. 45: 52. JSTOR 462930.
- Lauren Berlant; Michael Warner (1994). "Introduction to Critical Multiculturalism". In David Theo Goldberg (ed.). Multiculturalism: A Reader. Blackwell. pp. 107–113.
- Lauren Berlant (1994). "'68, or Something". Critical Inquiry. 21 (1): 124–155. doi:10.1086/448743. JSTOR 1343889.
  - Reprinted in: After Political Correctness: The Humanities and Society in the 1990s, eds. Christopher Newfield and Ronald Strickland (Westview Press, 1995), 313–339.
- Lauren Berlant (1995). "'68: or, The Revolution of Little Queers". In Robyn Wiegman; Diane Elam (eds.). Feminism Beside Itself. Routledge. pp. 297–311.
- Lauren Berlant; Michael Warner (1995). "What does Queer Theory teach us about X?". PMLA. 110 (3): 343–349. JSTOR 462930.
  - Reprinted in: The Routledge Critical and Cultural Theory Reader, eds. Neil Badmington and Julia Thomas (Routledge, 2008), 415–421.
- Lauren Berlant (1995). "Live Sex Acts (Parental Advisory: Explicit Material)". Feminist Studies. 21 (2): 379–404. doi:10.2307/3178273. JSTOR 3178273.
  - Reprinted in: Curiouser: On the Queerness of Children, ed. Natsha Hurley and Stephen Bruhm (University of Minnesota Press, 2004), 57–80.
- Lauren Berlant (1996). "The Face of America and the State of Emergency". In Dilip Gaonkar; Cary Nelson (eds.). Disciplinarity and Dissent in Cultural Studies. Routledge. pp. 397–440.
  - Reprinted in: Popular Culture: A Reader, eds. Raiford A Guins, Omayra Zaragoza Cruz (Sage, 2005), 309–323.
  - Reprinted in: The Race and Media Reader, ed. Gilbert Rodman (Routledge, 2014).
- Lauren Berlant (1997). "Collegiality, Crisis, and Cultural Studies". ADE Bulletin.
  - Reprinted in: Mediations 21 (1998): 6–15
  - Reprinted in: Profession(1998):105–116, https://www.jstor.org/stable/25595642
- Lauren Berlant (1997). "Feminism and the Institutions of Intimacy". In E. Ann Kaplan; George Levine (eds.). The Politics of Research (PDF). Rutgers UP. pp. 143–161.
- Lauren Berlant (1997). "Pax Americana: The Case of Show Boat". In William B. Warner; Deirdre Lynch (eds.). Cultural Institutions of the Novel. Duke UP. pp. 399–422.
- Lauren Berlant (1998). "Intimacy: A Special Issue". Critical Inquiry. 24 (2): 281–288. doi:10.1086/448875. JSTOR 1344169.
- Lauren Berlant; Michael Warner (1998). "Sex in Public". Critical Inquiry. 24 (2): 547–566. doi:10.1086/448884. JSTOR 1344178.
  - Reprinted in: The Cultural Studies Reader, 2nd. edition, ed. Simon During (Routledge, 1999).
  - Reprinted in: The Critical Tradition, ed. David Richter (Duke UP, 2002), (Bedford/St. Martin’s Press, 2007): 1721- 1733.
  - Reprinted in: The Routledge Queer Studies Reader, ed. Donald E. Hall and Annamarie Jagose (Routledge, 2012).
- Lauren Berlant (1998). "Poor Eliza". American Literature. 70 (3): 635–668. doi:10.2307/2902712. JSTOR 2902712.
  - Reprinted in: No More Separate Spheres!, eds. Cathy N. Davidson and Jessamyn Hatcher (Duke UP, 2002), 291–324.
- Lauren Berlant (1998). "The Subject of True Feeling: Pain, Privacy, and Politics". In Austin Sarat; Thomas Kearns (eds.). Cultural Pluralism, Identity Politics, and the Law. University of Michigan Press. pp. 49–84.
  - Reprinted in: Transformations: Thinking Through Feminism, eds. Jackie Stacey, Celia Lury, and Sara Ahmed (Routledge, 2000).
  - Reprinted in: Feminism at the Millennium, ed. Misha Kavka (Columbia UP, 2000).
  - Reprinted in: Cultural Studies and Political Theory, ed. Jodi Dean (Cornell UP, 2001), 42–62.
  - Reprinted in: Left Legalism, Left Critique, eds. Janet Halley and Wendy Brown (Duke UP, 2002), 105–133.
  - Reprinted in: Traumatizing Theory: The Cultural Politics of Affect In and Beyond Psychoanalysis, ed. Karyn Ball (Other Press, 2007).
- Lauren Berlant (1999). "The Compulsion to Repeat Femininity". In Joan Copjec; Michael Sorkin (eds.). Giving Ground: The Politics of Propinquity. Verso. pp. 207–232.
- Lauren Berlant (2000). "Love (A Queer Feeling)". In Tim Dean; Christopher Lane (eds.). Homosexuality and Psychoanalysis. University of Chicago Press. pp. 432–451.
  - Reprinted in: Feminisms Redux: An Anthology of Literary Theory and Criticism, eds. Diane Warhol and Robyn Herndyl (Rutgers UP, 2009), 244–276.
- Lauren Berlant (2000). "The Sublime and the Pretty". Venus Inferred. University of Chicago Press.
- Lauren Berlant (2000). "Mary Gaitskill". In Blanche Gelfant (ed.). The Columbia Companion to the Short Story. Columbia UP. pp. 268–272. doi:10.7312/gelf11098-051.
- Lauren Berlant (2001). "Trauma and Ineloquence". Cultural Values. 5 (1): 41–58. doi:10.1080/14797580109367220.
- Lauren Berlant (2002). "Uncle Sam Needs a Wife: Citizenship and Denegation". In Dana Nelson; Russ Castronovo (eds.). Materializing Democracy: Toward a Revitalized Cultural Politics. Duke UP. pp. 144–174.
  - Revised and reprinted in: Visual Worlds, eds. John R. Hall, Blake Stimson, Lisa Tamiris Becker (Routledge, 2006).
- Lauren Berlant (2002). "Two Girls, Fat and Thin". In Stephen Barber; David Clark (eds.). Regarding Sedgwick: Essays on Queer Culture and Critical Theory. Routledge. pp. 71–108.
- Lauren Berlant (2004). "Critical Inquiry/Affirmative Culture". Critical Inquiry. 30 (2): 445–451. doi:10.1086/421150.
  - Reprinted in: Sexualities in Education: A Reader, eds. Therese Quinn and Erica R. Meiners (Peter Lang, 2012).
- Lauren Berlant (2005). "Unfeeling Kerry". Theory and Event. 8 (2). doi:10.1353/tae.2005.0021.
- Lauren Berlant (2005). "The Epistemology of State Emotion". In Austin Sarat (ed.). Dissent in Dangerous Times. University of Michigan Press. pp. 46–78.
- Lauren Berlant (2006). "Cruel Optimism". Differences. 17 (3): 21–36. doi:10.1215/10407391-2006-009.
  - Longer version: Lauren Berlant (2007). "Cruel Optimism: on Marx, loss and the Senses". New Formations. 63.
  - Reprinted in: The Affect Theory Reader, eds. Melissa Gregg and Greg Seigworth (Duke UP, 2010), pp. 93–117.
- Lauren Berlant (2007). "Starved". South Atlantic Quarterly. 106 (3): 433–444. doi:10.1215/00382876-2007-002.
  - Reprinted in: After Sex? On Writing Since Queer Theory, eds. Janet Halley and Andrew Parker (Duke UP, 2011).
- Lauren Berlant (2007). "On The Case". Critical Inquiry. 33 (4): 663–672. doi:10.1086/521564.
- Lauren Berlant (2007). "Slow Death". Critical Inquiry. 33 (4): 754–780. doi:10.1086/521568.
- Lauren Berlant (2007). "Introduction: What does it matter who one is?". Critical Inquiry. 34 (1): 1–4. doi:10.1086/526085.
- Lauren Berlant (2007). "Nearly Utopian, Nearly Normal: Post-Fordist Affect in La Promesse and Rosetta". Public Culture. 19 (2): 272–301. doi:10.1215/08992363-2006-036.
- Lauren Berlant (2007). "Citizenship". In Bruce Burgett; Glenn Hendler (eds.). Keywords for American Cultural Studies. NYU Press. pp. 37–42.
- Lauren Berlant (2008). "Compassion (and Withholding) [Reprint from Compassion (2004)]". In Monica Greco; Paul Stenner (eds.). Emotions: A Social Science Reader. Routledge. pp. 434–438.
- Lauren Berlant (2009). "The Intimate Public Sphere [Reprint from The Queen of America Goes to Washington City (1997)]". In Janice A. Radway (ed.). American Studies: An Anthology. Wiley Blackwell. pp. 109–118.
- Lauren Berlant (2008). "Intuitionists: History and the Affective Event". American Literary History. 20 (4): 845–860. doi:10.1093/alh/ajn039. JSTOR 20492276.
  - Reprinted in: Contemporary Literary Criticism, ed. Jeff Hunter (Oxford UP, 2014).
- Lauren Berlant (2008). "Hard Feelings: Stephanie Brooks". Criticism. 49 (3): 407–419. doi:10.1353/crt.0.0033.
- Lauren Berlant (March 12, 2008). "Against Sexual Scandal". The Nation.
- Lauren Berlant (2008). "Thinking about Feeling Historical". Emotion, Space, and Society. 1 (1): 4–9. doi:10.1016/j.emospa.2008.08.006.
  - Reprinted in: Political Emotions, eds., Janet Staiger, Ann Cvetkovich, and Ann Reynolds (Routledge, 2010), 229–245.
- Lauren Berlant (2009). "Eve Sedgwick, Once More". Critical Inquiry. 35 (4): 1089–1091. doi:10.1086/605402.
- Lauren Berlant (2009). "Neither monstrous nor pastoral, but scary and sweet: Some thoughts on sex and emotional performance in Intimacies and What Do Gay Men Want?". Women & Performance: A Journal of Feminist Theory. 19 (2): 261–273. doi:10.1080/07407700903034212.
- Lauren Berlant (2009). "Affect is the New Trauma". The Minnesota Review. 71–72 (71–72): 131–136. doi:10.1215/00265667-2009-71-72-131.
  - Reprinted in: The Critical Pulse: Thirty-Six Credos by Contemporary Critics, eds., Jeffrey Williams and Heather Steffen (Columbia UP, 2012), 173–179.
- Lauren Berlant (2009). "Dear journal of visual culture". Journal of Visual Culture. 8 (2): 166–167. doi:10.1177/147041290900800204061.
- Lauren Berlant (2010). "Risky Bigness: On Obesity, Eating, and the Ambiguity of "Health"". In Jonathan M. Metzl; Anna Kirkland (eds.). Against Health: How Health Became the New Morality. NYU Press. pp. 26–39.
- Lauren Berlant (2011). "A Properly Political Concept of Love: Three Approaches in Ten Pages". Cultural Anthropology. 26 (4): 683–691. doi:10.1111/j.1548-1360.2011.01120.x.
- Lauren Berlant (2011). "Opulism". South Atlantic Quarterly. 110 (1): 235–242. doi:10.1215/00382876-2010-032.
- Lauren Berlant (2012). "Feel Tank". Counterpoints. 367: 340–343. JSTOR 42981415.
- Lauren Berlant (2014). "Showing up to Withhold: Pope.L's Deadpan Aesthetic". Pope.L: Showing up to Withhold. University of Chicago Press. pp. 107–135. ISBN 9-780-2262-0006-4.
- Lauren Berlant (2014). "She's Having an Episode: Patricia Williams and the Writing of Damaged Life". Columbia Journal of Gender and Law. 27 (1): 19–35. doi:10.7916/cjgl.v27i1.2697.
- Lauren Berlant (2015). "Structures of Unfeeling: Mysterious Skin". The International Journal of Politics, Culture and Society. 28 (3): 191–213. doi:10.1007/s10767-014-9190-y.
- Lauren Berlant (2015). "A Momentary Anesthesia of the Heart". The International Journal of Politics, Culture and Society. 28 (3): 273–281. doi:10.1007/s10767-014-9194-7.
- Lauren Berlant; Lee Edelman (2015). "Reading, Sex, and the Unbearable: A Response to Tim Dean". American Literary History. 27 (3): 625–629. doi:10.1093/alh/ajv035.
- Lauren Berlant (2016). "The Commons: An Infrastructure for Troubling Times". Environment and Planning D: Society and Space. 34 (3): 393–419. doi:10.1177/0263775816645989.
- Lauren Berlant (August 5, 2016). "Trump: or Political Emotions". The New Inquiry.
- Lauren Berlant; Sianne Ngai (2017). "Comedy Has Issues". Critical Inquiry. 43 (2): 233–249. doi:10.1086/689666.
- Lauren Berlant (2017). "Humorlessness (3 Monologues and a Hairpiece)". Critical Inquiry. 43 (2): 305–340. doi:10.1086/689657.
- Lauren Berlant (December 13, 2017). "The Predator and the Jokester". The New Inquiry. and "The Predator and the Jokester". bullybloggers. December 13, 2017.
  - Reprinted in: Where Freedom Starts: Sex Power Violence #MeToo: A Verso Report (Verso Books, 2018) ISBN 978-1-78873-275-8.
- Lauren Berlant. "Big Man". Social Text online.
- Lauren Berlant (2018). "Genre Flailing". Capacious: Journal for Emerging Affect Inquiry. 1 (2): 156–162. doi:10.22387/CAP2018.16.
- Lauren Berlant; Kathleen Stewart (2019). "Couplets". Women & Performance: A Journal of Feminist Theory. 29 (3): 199–210. doi:10.1080/0740770X.2019.1671105.
- Lauren Berlant; Lee Edelman (2019). "What Survives?". In Berlant (ed.). Reading Sedgwick. Duke University Press. pp. 37–63.
- Lauren Berlant; Kathleen Stewart (2020). "The Citizenship Question, or, A Hundred and a Piece, a Leaky Citizenship Form". The Georgia Review. 74 (1): 111–113. JSTOR 26933845.
- Lauren Berlant; Kathleen Stewart (2020). "Dilations". In Carole Ann McGranahan (ed.). Writing Anthropology: Essay on Craft and Commitment. Duke University Press. pp. 206–211. doi:10.1215/9781478009160. ISBN 978-1-4780-0916-0.
- Lauren Berlant (November 22, 2020). "The Traumic: On Bojack Horseman's 'Good Damage". Post45:Contemporaries.
- Feel Tank Chicago (2021). "The Present Is What We Are Doing Together". In Julie Hollenbach; Robin Alex McDonald (eds.). Re/Imagining Depression: Creative Approaches to "Feeling Bad". Palgrave Macmillan. pp. 195–214. doi:10.1007/978-3-030-80554-8_15. ISBN 978-3-030-80553-1.
- Lauren Berlant (2021). "An excerpt from Riva Lehrer's Golem Girl: A Memoir". Biography. 44 (1): 8. doi:10.1353/bio.2021.0030.
- Lauren Berlant; Kathleen Stewart (2022). "Some stories, more scenes". The Sociological Review. 70 (4): 856–859. doi:10.1177/00380261221106513.
- Lauren Berlant (2023). "Poisonality". In Gregory J. Seigworth; Carolyn Pedwell (eds.). The Affect Theory Reader II: Worldings, Tensions, Futures. Duke University Press. pp. 451–463. ISBN 978-1-4780-2491-0.
- Lauren Berlant (2023). "13 Ways of Looking at a Reimer". In Karen Reimer (ed.). Endless. University of Chicago Press. ISBN 9-780-9453-2327-3.
- Lauren Berlant; Kathleen Stewart (2025). "Gesture, A Build". In Alice Butler; Nell Osborne; Hilary White (eds.). Gestures: A body of work. Manchester University Press. pp. 312–316. doi:10.7765/9781526168481.00037. ISBN 978-1-5261-6848-1.

=== Interviews and dialogues ===
- Imogen Tyler; Elena Loizidou (2000). "The Promise of Berlant: An Interview". Cultural Values. 4 (4): 497–511. doi:10.1080/14797580009367213.
- Lauren Berlant; Jane Gallop (2001). "Loose Lips: An Interview with Jane Gallop". In Lauren Berlant; Lisa Duggan (eds.). Our Monica, Ourselves: The Clinton Affair and the National Interest. NYU Press. doi:10.18574/nyu/9780814739280.001.0001. ISBN 978-0-8147-9864-5.
- Andrew Hoberek (2002). "Citizen Berlant: An Interview with Lauren Berlant". Minnesota Review. 52–54: 127–140.
  - Reprinted in: Interviews from the Minnesota Review, ed. Jeffrey Williams (2004).
- Lauren Berlant; Sina Najafi; David Serlin (Fall 2008). "The Broken Circuit: An Interview with Lauren Berlant". Cabinet.
  - Reprinted in: Reading/Feeling, ed. Tanja Baudoin, Frédérique Bergholtz, and Vivian Ziher [The Affect Reader of the “If I Can’t Dance” collective], 2013. "Reading/Feeling".
- Lauren Berlant; Dorothea Lasky (Summer 2009). "I Don't Understand the God Part: A Conversation between and Lauren Berlant". Make magazine.
  - Reprinted in Make X, ed. Jose-Luis Moctezuma, 2016.
- Lauren Berlant; Gesa Helms; Marina Vishmidt (Winter 2010). "Affect & the Politics of Austerity: An Interview Exchange with Lauren Berlant". Variant. pp. 3–6.
- Lauren Berlant; Jay Prosser (2011). "Life Writing and Intimate Publics: An Interview with Lauren Berlant". Biography. 34 (1): 180–187. doi:10.1353/bio.2011.0008. JSTOR 23541186.
- Lauren Berlant; Earl McCabe (2011). "Depressive Realism: An Interview with Lauren Berlant". Hypocrite Reader.
- Lauren Berlant, “On her book Cruel Optimism,” 5 June 2012, Rorotoko at http://rorotoko.com/interview/20120605_berlant_lauren_on_cruel_optimism/.
- Ben Myers, “Interview with Lauren Berlant–Author of Cruel Optimism,” "The Critical Lede". August 25, 2012. (podcast)
- Lauren Berlant; Jordan Greenwald (2012). "Affect in the End Times: A Conversation with Lauren Berlant". Qui Parle. 20 (2): 71–89. doi:10.5250/quiparle.20.2.0071.
- Lauren Berlant; Yubraj Aryal (2012). "Interview with Lauren Berlant: Affect and the Political". Journal of Philosophy: A Cross-Disciplinary Inquiry. 7 (17): 70–73. doi:10.5840/jphilnepal20127177.
- Heather Davis; Paige Sarlin; Lauren Berlant; Michael Hardt (2011). "No One is Sovereign in Love". No More Potlucks.
- Heather Davis; Paige Sarlin; Lauren Berlant; Michael Hardt (2012). "The Risk of a New Relationality" (PDF). BRIC. 1 (3).
- Lauren Berlant; Dana Luciano (2013). "Conversation: Lauren Berlant with Dana Luciano". Social Text / Periscope.
- Jennifer Cooke; Lauren Berlant (2013). "Politics, Teaching, Art and Writing: an Interview with Lauren Berlant". Textual Practice. 27 (6): 961–970. doi:10.1080/0950236X.2013.830820.
- David Seitz; Lauren Berlant (February 19, 2013). "Lauren Berlant's Queer Optimism". XTRA!. (shorter version)
- David Seitz; Lauren Berlant (March 13, 2013). "Interview with Lauren Berlant". Society and Space. (longer version)
- Lauren Berlant; Claudia Rankine (2014). "Claudia Rankine by Lauren Berlant". Bomb (129).
- Anna Poletti; Julie Rak; Lauren Berlant (2014). "The Blog as Experimental Setting: an interview with Lauren Berlant". In Anna Poletti; Julie Rak (eds.). Identity Technologies: Constructing the Self Online. University of Wisconsin Press. pp. 259–271. ISBN 978-0299296445.
- Lauren Berlant; Elizabeth A. Povinelli (October 2014). "Holding Up the World, Part III: In the Event of Precarity … A Conversation". E-flux (58).
- Lauren Berlant; Jordan Alexander Stein (2015). "Cruising Veganism". GLQ. 21 (1): 18–23.
- Christa Robbins; Kris Cohen (2015). "Beyond Formaldehyde, An Interview with Lauren Berlant". Open Set. Archived from the original on April 27, 2016.
- 2016 Summer School for Sexualities, Culture and Politics (November 28, 2016). "Interview with Lauren Berlant" (video). youtube.com. IPAK Centar.
- Bea Malsky (2017). "Pleasure Won". The Point.
- Libe García Zarranz; Evelyne Ledoux-Beaugrand; Lauren Berlant (2017). "Affective Assemblages: Entanglements & Ruptures—An Interview with Lauren Berlant". Atlantis. 38 (2): 12–17. doi:10.7202/1119219ar.
- Nicholas Manning; Lauren Berlant (2018). "Intensity is a signal, not a truth": An interview with Lauren Berlant". Revue française d'études américaines. 154: 113–120.
- Maria Dimitrova (2019). "Lauren Berlant". TANK. 61.
- Lauren Berlant; Paul Rand (2019). "Why chasing the good life is holding us back". Big Brains. (podcast)
- Lauren Berlant; Katarzyna Bojarska (2019). "The Hundreds, observation, encounter, atmosphere, and world-making". Journal of Visual Culture. 18 (3): 289–304. doi:10.1177/1470412919875404.
- Lauren Berlant; Charlie Markbreiter (March 22, 2019). "Can't Take a Joke: An interview with Lauren Berlant". The New Inquiry.
- Bessie Dernikos (2020). "Intimacy and Depletion in the Pedagogical Scene: An Interview with Lauren Berlant". In Bessie Dernikos; Nancy Lesko; Stephanie McCall; Alyssa Niccolini (eds.). Mapping the Affective Turn in Education: Theory, Research, and Pedagogies. Routledge. pp. 247–250. doi:10.4324/9781003004219. ISBN 9781032237022.
- Hans Demeyer (2021). "Lauren Berlant on Intimacy as World-Making". Extra Extra. 16.
- Lauren Berlant; Ann Cvetkovich; Deborah Gould; Megan Boler; Elizabeth Davis (2022). "On taking the affective turn: interview with Lauren Berlant, Ann Cvetkovich, and Deborah Gould". Cultural Studies. 36 (3): 360–377. doi:10.1080/09502386.2022.2040562.

=== Literary Publications ===
- Lauren Berlant (2013). ""Abusive Encounters for the Revolution" and "Three Elizas," Two Series from "The Hundreds,"". Tag Journal. 2. (Weekday #4, excerpts from Supervalent Thought)
- Lauren Berlant (2013). "Politics, Desire, and the Ordinary: Two Blog Entries". Interval(le)s. II.2 – III.1. (Weekday #4, excerpts from Supervalent Thought)
- Lauren Berlant; Stephanie Brooks (2016). "Stony Island Story Problem". Virginia Quarterly Review. 92 (4): 17.
- Lauren Berlant (2017). "Poem/Fault". Thresholds. 1 (1): 15–16.
- Lauren Berlant (March 4, 2015). "Do You Intend to Die?". King's Review. 1 (1).
- Lauren Berlant. "Weekday #4, excerpts from Supervalent Thought". In Anna de Filippi; Kylie Gilchrist; Megan Stockton (eds.). Notes on Value.

=== Film appearances ===
- Shannon Walsh (2019). Illusions of Control. Canada: Last Songbird Productions.

=== Works in translation ===
- Lauren Berlant; Michael Warner (1999). "Sexo en público [Spanish translation of "Sex in Public"]". Fractal. IV (12): 91–120.
- Lauren Berlant; Michael Warner (2002). "Sexo en público [Spanish translation of "Sex in Public"]". In Rafael M. Mérida Jiménez (ed.). Sexualidades transgresoras: una antología de estudios queer. Icaria Editorial. pp. 229–252. ISBN 9788474265620.
- Lauren Berlant; Michael Warner (2005). "Sex in der Öffentlichkeit [German translation of "Sex in Public"]". In Matthias Haase; Marc Siegel; Michaela Wünsch (eds.). Outside: Die Politik queerer Räume. Translated by Birgit Kaiser and Kathrin Thiele. b_books verlag. pp. 77–103. ISBN 3-933557-25-9.
- Lauren Berlant (2011). El corazón de la nación, ensayos sobre política y sentimentalismo [Spanish translated collection, The Heart of the Nation. Essays on politics and sentimentalism]. Fondo de Cultura Economica. ISBN 978-6071607898.
- Lauren Berlant (2012). "Optimismo Cruel [Spanish translation of "Cruel Optimism"]". Debate Feminista. 45. Translated by Nattie Golubov: 107–135. JSTOR 42625246.
- Lauren Berlant; Michael Hardt; Heather Davis; Paige Sarlin (2016). "Aşkta Kimse Hükümdar Değil [Turkish translation of "No One is Sovereign in Love" (2011)]". Amargi.
- Lauren Berlant (2018). "Trauma i niewymowność [Polish translation of "Trauma and Ineloquence"]" (PDF). Teksty Drugie. 3. Translated by Peter Borum: 176–195. doi:10.18318/td.2018.3.12.
- Lauren Berlant; Michael Warner (2018). "Sexe en publique [French translation of "Sex in Public"]". Questions de Communication (in French). 33 (1). Translated by Maxime Cervulle et Clémence Garrot: 111–133. doi:10.4000/questionsdecommunication.12204.
- Lauren Berlant; Michael Warner (2019). "¿Qué nos enseña la teoría cuir sobre x? [Spanish translation of "What Does Queer Theory Teach Us About X?"]". Revista de Educación (in Spanish). 18. Translated by Luciana Salandro: 21–30.
- Lauren Berlant (2020). El Optimismo Cruel [Spanish translation of Cruel Optimism]. Translated by Hugo Salas and Cecilia Macón. Caja Negra. ISBN 978-9871622870.
- Lauren Berlant (2021). "Stakkels Eliza [Danish translation of "Poor Eliza"]". K&K-Kultur og Klasse. 49 (132). Translated by Peter Borum: 13–58.
- Lauren Berlant (2023). Begehren/Liebe [German translation of Desire/Love]. Translated by Johanna Ekenhorst. Merve. ISBN 978-3-96273-072-7.
- Lauren Berlant (2023). Can ku de le guan zhu yi [残酷的乐观主义][Chinese translation of Cruel Optimism]. Zhong guo gong ren chu ban she (中国工人出版社).
- Lauren Berlant (2024). Zalim İyimserlik [Turkish translation of Cruel Optimism]. Translated by M. Çağlar Atmaca. Minotor Kitap. ISBN 978-6256461260.
- Lauren Berlant (2024). Grausamer Optimismus [German translation of Cruel Optimism]. Translated by Jennifer Sophia Theodor. b-books. ISBN 978-3942214513.
- Lauren Berlant (2024). 残酷な楽観性 / Zankoku na rakkansei [Japanese translation of Cruel Optimism]. Translated by Kyoko Hearn Shoji and Madoka Kishi. kadensha. ISBN 9784763421883.
- Lauren Berlant; Lee Edelman (2024). SEXO O LO INSOPORTABLE - DESEO:AMOR [Spanish translation of Sex, or The Unbearable and Desire/Love]. Irrecuperables. ISBN 978-8485209651.
- Lauren Berlant (2025). Ottimismo crudele [Italian translation of Cruel Optimism]. Translated by Chiara Reali and Giorgia Demuro. Timeo. ISBN 979-1281227071.
- Lauren Berlant (2026). Cruel optimisme, attachements et impasses des présents précaires [French translation of Cruel Optimism] (in French). Translated by Lilith A. Daemon. Canada/Belgique: Éditions Météores et Éditions de la rue Dorion. ISBN 978-2931307038.

== See also ==
- Achille Mbembe
- Jasbir Puar
- Necropolitics
