= Elizabeth Freeman (disambiguation) =

Elizabeth Freeman (1742–1829) was an African-American woman who gained freedom from slavery in Massachusetts.

Elizabeth Freeman may also refer to:

- Elizabeth Freeman (professor) (1966–2024), American professor
- Lizzie Freeman (Elizabeth Rose Freeman, born 1992), American voice actress

== See also ==
- Elisabeth Freeman (1876–1942), American suffragist and civil rights activist
- Betty Freeman (1921–2009), American photographer and philanthropist
- Beth Labson Freeman (born 1953), American judge
- Elise Freeman, a fictional character from Wrong Side of Town
- Mary and Eliza Freeman Houses
