= Vaughn Rasberry =

American academic

- Born: Gary Vaughn Rasberry II
- Spouse: Tatyana Ali (m. 2016)
- Children: 2
- Awards: American Book Award (2017)

Academic background
- Education: Howard University (BA); University of Chicago (MA, PhD)
- Doctoral advisor: Kenneth W. Warren; Lauren Berlant

Academic work
- Discipline: African American literature, postcolonialism
- Institutions: Stanford University

Gary Vaughn Rasberry II is an American academic whose research focuses on African American literature and postcolonialism. He is an associate professor of English and associate vice provost for graduate education at Stanford University.

== Early life and education ==
Gary Vaughn Rasberry II was raised in South Los Angeles. He earned a B.A. in English language and literature from Howard University in 2000. He completed a M.A. in humanities in 2001 and Ph.D. in English language and literature in 2009 at the University of Chicago. His dissertation was titled "In the Twilight of Jim Crow: African American Literature, Totalitarianism, and the Cold War." His advisors were Kenneth W. Warren and Lauren Berlant. From 2008 to 2009, Rasberry was a Fulbright scholar at Humboldt University of Berlin.

== Career ==
In 2010, Rasberry became an assistant professor of English at Stanford University, later promoted to an associate professor.

In 2016, Rasberry authored a monograph, Race and the Totalitarian Century: Geopolitics in the Black Literary Imagination, published by Harvard University Press. It is a revisionist account of mid-twentieth century Black culture during World War II and the Cold War. Rasberry critiques the traditional definition of totalitarianism by challenging the Eurocentric focus of Cold War scholarship. He argues that African American and Third World writers including W. E. B. Du Bois, Shirley Graham Du Bois, Richard Wright, C. L. R. James, and others used nonalignment and anticolonial techniques to broaden the concept of totalitarianism. Rasberry connects how these writers framed Western colonialism, slavery, and Jim Crow laws as forms of totalitarianism within Western liberal democracies.

The book received the 2017 Ralph Bunche Award from the American Political Science Association and an American Book Award from the Before Columbus Foundation. It was shortlisted for a Christian Gauss Award. Reviewers described the work as a "magisterial" and "theoretically sophisticated" study that "completely transforms our understanding of both totalitarianism and midcentury Black writing." They praised its analysis of topics including Black soldiers, the Suez Crisis in the Black press, and the late careers of Du Bois, Graham, and Wright.

In 2022, Rasberry became an associate vice provost for graduate education at Stanford.

== Personal life ==
Rasberry met actor and singer Tatyana Ali on eHarmony in 2014. They married two years later in Beverly Hills, California. They have two sons.
