= Tatyana Ali =

American actress and singer (born 1979)

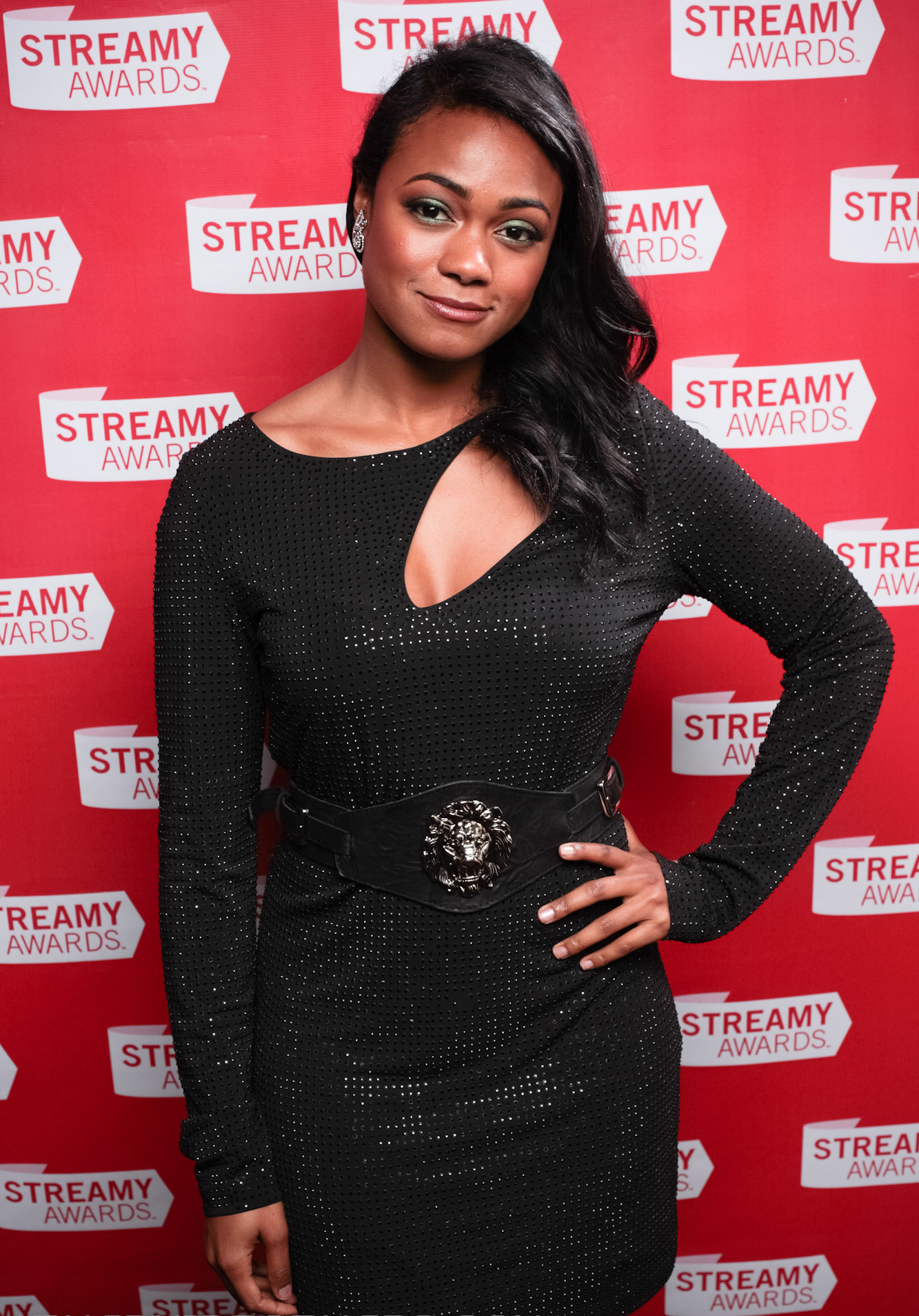
- Ali in 2010
- Born: Tatyana Marisol Ali; January 24, 1979 (age 47); North Bellmore, New York, U.S.
- Education: Harvard University (AB)
- Occupations: Actress; singer
- Years active: 1987–present
- Spouse: Vaughn Rasberry (m. 2016)
- Children: 2
- Musical career
- Genre: R&B
- Instrument: Vocals
- Labels: MJJ; Work Group
- Website: tatyanaalitv.com

Tatyana Marisol Ali (born January 24, 1979) is an American actress and singer. She began her career as a child actress, appearing on the PBS television program Sesame Street. She rose to prominence with her role as Ashley Banks on the NBC sitcom The Fresh Prince of Bel-Air from 1990 to 1996. Her debut album Kiss the Sky (1998), was certified gold by the Recording Industry Association of America, and spawned the hit single "Daydreamin'", which peaked in the top ten of the Billboard Hot 100.

She also starred on the TV One original series Love That Girl!, portrayed Roxanne on the CBS soap opera The Young and the Restless from 2007 to 2013, and voiced the character Mrs. James on the Disney Channel animated series Fancy Nancy.

== Early life and education ==
Tatyana Ali was born on January 24, 1979, in North Bellmore, New York. She is of mixed African and South Asian ancestry or Dougla, born to an Indo-Trinidadian father and an Afro-Panamanian mother. Ali graduated from The Buckley School in 1997. Ali attended Harvard University, where she received a Bachelor of Arts in African-American Studies and Government in 2002. On a celebrity edition of the game show The Chase, which aired February 3, 2015, Ali stated that her major was political science.

== Career ==
In 1985, six-year-old Ali began her acting career as a regular performer on the PBS children's educational program Sesame Street. Her tenure included an appearance with jazz great Herbie Hancock, who demonstrated his Fairlight CMI synthesizer using a sample of Ali's voice. She also appeared in two episodes of Star Search, one of which featured her performance of a cover of Marvin Gaye's and Tammi Terrell's hit "Ain't No Mountain High Enough".

She made her breakthrough in 1990 when she was cast as Ashley Banks on the NBC television sitcom The Fresh Prince of Bel-Air, a role she played throughout the series' entire run, from 1990 to 1996.

Ali's vocal talent was featured on several episodes of Fresh Prince in later seasons, prompting the show's star Will Smith to ask her if she would seriously consider pursuing a musical career. She ultimately decided, for the time being, to continue to concentrate on her acting career. In the series' final season, however, Ali performed several songs, ultimately culminating in her debut album Kiss the Sky in 1998. It was certified gold in early 1999, only months after its release, and spawned the Rodney "Darkchild" Jerkins-produced hit single "Daydreamin'", released July 21, 1998, which peaked at No. 6 on the Billboard Hot 100 and also appeared on the UK Singles Chart. The album spawned two further UK hits, "Boy You Knock Me Out" featuring Will Smith — which peaked at No. 3 and is her biggest hit to date — and "Everytime", which was her third top-20 hit in the UK, peaking at No. 20. She made an appearance on Smith's album Willennium on the track "Who Am I" with MC Lyte. She performed the title song "Sunny Valentine" along with Terrence Quaites for the indie film Rockin' Meera in 2005. In early 2008, she performed on the song "Yes We Can", a will.i.am project supporting Barack Obama's presidential campaign. She also appeared in the subsequent music video, which garnered coverage on the "What the Buzz" segment of ABC's World News Now. In January 2014, Ali released an EP titled Hello, whose first single was "Wait For It", which she performed on The Arsenio Hall Show on February 4, 2014.

Apart from her musical career, Ali continued to land roles in films such as The Brothers, Glory Road, and Nora's Hair Salon (and its sequel), among others. From 2009 to 2010, she produced and starred in the BET web series Buppies. She was on recurring status on the CBS soap opera The Young and the Restless as Roxanne from 2007 to 2013. Ali starred in the TV One original series Love That Girl! as Tyana (whose name was derived from Ali's given name). In 2013, she co-starred as Maya in the BET comedy Second Generation Wayans, alongside Craig Wayans and Damien Dante Wayans.

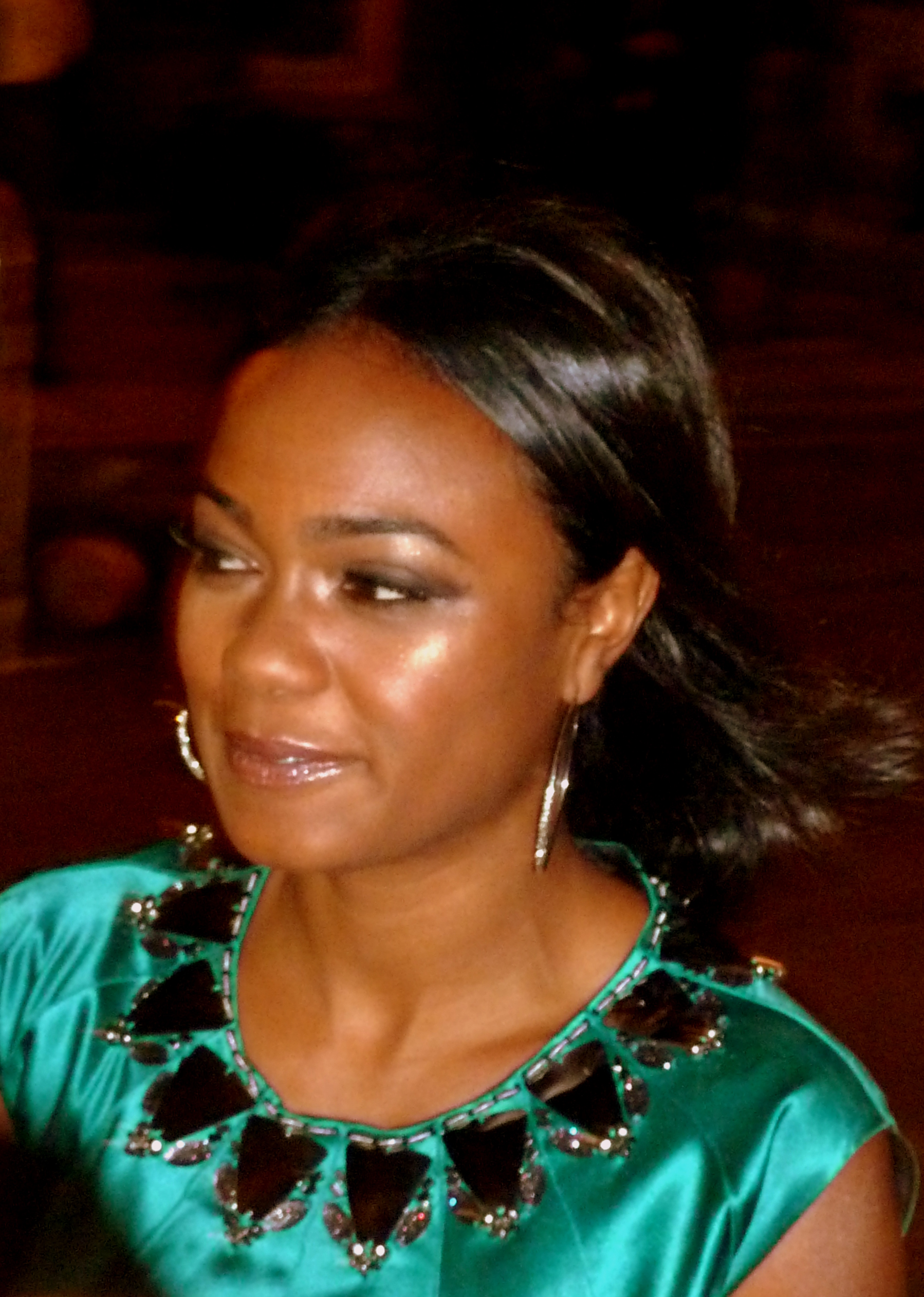
Ali in 2012.

In 2011, Ali received the Living Legacy Award from the Caribbean Heritage Organization in Los Angeles.

In July 2016, Ali sued Warner Bros., claiming that the company stole her idea for the show The Real, after she pitched the concept in December 2012. The case was dismissed in February 2017.

== Personal life ==
She dated actor Jonathan Brandis from 1995 to 2001.

She traveled the United States as a spokesperson for Barack Obama's 2008 presidential campaign, and headed voter registration drives at college campuses.

In March 2016, Ali revealed that she was engaged to Vaughn Rasberry, an assistant professor of English at Stanford University, whom she had met on eHarmony, and they announced that they were expecting their first child. She and Rasberry married on July 17, 2016, in Beverly Hills, California. They have two sons.

Ali is an honorary member of Zeta Phi Beta; she was inducted on July 27, 2024 at the sorority's Boulé in Indianapolis, Indiana.

=== Philanthropy and advocacy ===
Ali is an advocate for Black and Indigenous maternal health. In 2016, Ali experienced what she calls "obstetric violence" during the delivery of her first-born son, where she underwent an emergency C-section after doctors pushed her crowning baby back into her body. Ali has taken her advocacy to Washington D.C., having testified in front of Congress about her experience and the need to put an end to the Black maternal health crisis. She is the founder of Baby Yams, a quilt line that funds scholarships to Black and Indigenous midwives, doulas and student birth workers. Her team makes heritage baby quilts in vivid ankara and batik fabrics.

== Filmography ==
=== Film ===
Year	Title	Role	Notes
1987	Eddie Murphy Raw	Eddie's Sister	
1988	Crocodile Dundee II	Park Girl	
1988	Wow, You're a Cartoonist!	Child Cartoonist	Video
1997	Kiss the Girls	Janell Cross	
1997	Fakin' da Funk	Karyn	
1998	The Clown at Midnight	Monica	
1999	Jawbreaker	Brenda	
2000	Brother	Latifa	
2001	The Brothers	Cherie Smith	
2003	National Lampoon Presents Dorm Daze	Claire	
2004	Nora's Hair Salon	Lilleana	
2005	Domino One	Laeticia Richards	
2005	Back in the Day	Alicia Packer	
2006	Glory Road	Tina Malichi	
2006	A Warm Place	Clair Andrews	Short
2007	The List	Cynthia	
2008	Nora's Hair Salon 2: A Cut Above	Lilleana	
2008	Hotel California	Jessie	
2009	Locker 13: Down and Out	Lucy	Short
2009	Mother and Child	Maria	
2010	Pete Smalls Is Dead	Cocktail Waitress	
2010	Privileged	Talia	Video
2011	Geo n Rat	Det. Erica Anderson	Short
2011	23rd Psalm: Redemption	Stacey Wayne	
2012	Dysfunctional Friends	Alex	
2012	Home Again	Marva Johnson	
2013	24 Hour Love	Simply	
2013	The Last Letter	Jillian	
2013	A Very Larry Christmas	Nicole	
2014	The Divorce	Victoria	
2014	The Black Bachelor	Herself	Short
2014	Locker 13	Lucy	
2014	Comeback Dad	Nima	
2015	Save for Now	Woman	Short
2015	November Rule	Leah	
2015	Supermodel	Lauren	
2015	Teachers	Ms. Faith Mayfield	Short
2016	Samaria	Audrey	Short
2017	Graham: A Dog's Story	Stella	Short
2018	Doe	Rachel	
2020	The Reason	Macey	
2022	It Snows All the Time	Technologist	
2026	Mr. Nelson, Did You Kill People?	Linda	Completed

=== Television ===
Year	Title	Role	Notes
1984–1997	Sesame Street	Tatyana	Guest (seasons 16 & 18–19 & 23 & 28), recurring cast (season 17 & 21)
1987	Star Search	Herself/Contestant	Contestant (season 5)
1989	A Man Called Hawk	Michelle	Episode: "Life After Death"
1989	The Cosby Show	Girl	Episode: "Shall We Dance?"
1989	Wally and the Valentines	Jamaica Valentine	TV movie
1990–1996	The Fresh Prince of Bel-Air	Ashley Banks	Main cast
1992	Where in the World Is Carmen Sandiego?	Herself	Episode: "Episode 2.1" & "2.45"
1993	Getting By	Nicole Alexander/Vanessa	Guest cast (season 1–2)
1994	Are You Afraid of the Dark?	Laura/Connie	Episode: "The Tale of the Quicksilver"
1995	Soul Train	Herself/Guest Host	Episode: "KRS-One/Dehorah Cox/Shaggy"
1995	In the House	Ashley Banks	Episode: "Dog Catchers"
1996	Living Single	Stephanie James	Episode: "Whatever Happened to Baby Sister?"
1996	Kidz in the Wood	Rita	TV movie
1996	Fall Into Darkness	Sharon McKay	TV movie
1997	413 Hope St.	Kai	Episode: "Heartbeat"
1998	All That	Herself	Episode: "Tatyana Ali"
1999	Live & Kicking	Herself	Episode: "Episode 6.17" & "6.19"
1999	The Pop Zone	Herself	Episode: "Episode 2.5"
2002	Fastlane	Shelly	Episode: "Girls Own Juice"
2003	Half & Half	Olivia	Episode: "The Big Condom-nation Episode"
2005	The Greatest	Herself	Episode: "100 Greatest Kid Stars"
2006	Child Star Confidential	Herself	Episode: "Primetime Princess"
2007	Boulevard of Broken Dreams	Herself	Episode: "Jonathan Brandis"
2007	On the Lot	Herself	Episode: "First Sight"
2007	E! True Hollywood Story	Herself	Episode: "Will Smith"
2007–2013	The Young and the Restless	Roxanne	Regular cast
2009	Catch 21	Herself/Contestant	Episode: "Fresh Prince of Bel-Air"
2009–2010	Buppies	Quinci	Main cast; also executive producer
2010	Running Russell Simmons	Herself	Episode: "You Only Live Once"
2010–2012	Love That Girl!	Tyana Jones	Main cast (season 1–3); also producer
2011	Unsung	Herself	Episode: "Deniece Williams"
2011	Pastport	Herself	Episode: "Panama"
2013	Anderson Live	Herself/Co-Host	Episode: "Episode 2.82"
2013	Second Generation Wayans	Maya	Main cast
2013	Dear Secret Santa	Jennifer	
2014	The Daily Helpline	Herself/Co-Host	Episode: "Tatyana Ali"
2015	The Chase	Herself/Contestant	Episode: "Episode 5.2"
2015	Key & Peele	Heresa	Episode: "Hollywood Sequel Doctor"
2015	Fatal Flip	Roslyn	TV movie
2016	Zoe Ever After	Ashley King	Recurring cast
2016	Second Sight	Clara	TV movie
2017	90's House	Herself	Episode: "The One With the Big Finale"
2017	American Koko	N'Shay	Episode: "The Stig"
2017	Nanny's Nightmare	Monica Thorne	TV movie
2017	Wrapped Up in Christmas	Heather Nash	TV movie
2018	Hollywood Darlings	Tatyana	Episode: "Big White Lies"
2018	The Bobby Brown Story	Sarah Flint	Episode: "Part One"
2018	Christmas Everlasting	Lucy	TV movie
2018	Jingle Belle	Belle Williams	TV movie; also producer
2018	Olive Forever	Alison	Episode: "Pilot"
2018–2022	Fancy Nancy	Mrs. James (voice)	Recurring cast (season 1–2), guest (season 3)
2019	College Dating App	Professor Savoy	TV movie
2019	Christmas Hotel	Erin	TV movie; also producer
2020	Entertainment Tonight	Herself/Guest Co-Host	Episode: "Episode 40.58"
2021	A Picture Perfect Holiday	Gaby	TV movie
2022	Wheel of Fortune	Herself/Celebrity Contestant	Episode: "Curtis Stone, Haley Joel Osment and Tatyana Ali"
2022	RuPaul's Secret Celebrity Drag Race	Herself/Chakra 7	Contestant (season 2)
2022	Vanished: Searching for My Sister	Jada/Kayla	TV movie
2023	See It Loud: The History of Black Television	Herself	Episode: "Keeping It Real"
2023	Bel-Air	Mrs. Hughes	Recurring cast (season 2)
2023	Giving Hope: The Ni'Cola Mitchell Story	Ni'cola Mitchell	TV movie
2023	The Holiday Proposal Plan	Sonny Kravitz	TV movie
2024	Perimeter	Connie Dawn	Main cast
2024–2026	Abbott Elementary	Crystal	Episodes: "Panel", "Smith Playground", "District Budget Meeting", "Audit", "Rally", "No Homework"
2024	After Midnight	Herself	Episode: June 3, 2024
2026	Dancing with the Stars	Herself	Contestant (season 35)

== Discography ==
=== Studio albums ===
List of studio albums, with selected chart positions and certifications
Title	Album details	Peak chart positions			
Title	Album details	US	US R&B	UK	UK R&B
Kiss the Sky	Released: August 25, 1998; Formats: CD, cassette; Label: Work Group	106	47	41	6
"—" denotes releases that did not chart or were not released in that territory.

=== Extended plays ===
List of extended plays, with selected chart positions
Title	Album details
Hello	Released: January 21, 2014; Formats: CD, digital download; Label: Self-released
All I Have	Released: December 1, 2023; Formats: Streaming; Label: Self-released

=== Singles ===
List of singles, with selected chart positions and certifications
Title	Year	Peak chart positions									Certifications	Album
Title	Year	US	US R&B	BEL	FRA	IRL	NL	NZ	UK	UK R&B	Certifications	Album
"Daydreamin'"	1998	6	5	—	—	—	—	3	6	3	RIAA: Gold; RMNZ: Gold	Kiss the Sky
"Boy You Knock Me Out" (featuring Will Smith)	1998	—	68	56	32	19	77	12	3	1	RMNZ: Gold; BPI: Silver	Kiss the Sky
"Everytime"	1999	—	73	—	—	—	—	—	20	4		Kiss the Sky
"Wait for It"	2014	—	—	—	—	—	—	—	—	—		Hello
"—" denotes releases that did not chart or were not released in that territory.

=== Other appearances ===
Title	Year	Other Artist(s)	Album
"Love The Way You Love Me"	1999	—N/a	More!
"Precious Wings"	1999	—N/a	The Adventures of Elmo in Grouchland
"Who Am I"	1999	Will Smith and MC Lyte	Willennium
"Getting Closer"	1999	Kel Spencer	Wild Wild West
"Candy Girl"	2007	Kanary Diamonds	Puro Fuego
"Wanna Groove"	2009	Inverse	So Far
"Move It, Shake It"	2009	Just Matter and Nieve	Love N' Dancing
"Bathtub Gin"	2009	The Cherokee Rhythm Section	Love N' Dancing
"Joy to the World"	2013	—N/a	Dear Secret Santa
"Kiss the Sky"	2015	—N/a	The Legacy of R&B Slow Jamz
"He Loves Me"	2016	—N/a	The Legacy of Nu Soul
"Ghost Town"	2017	—N/a	Music to Inspire

== Awards and nominations ==
Caribbean Heritage Organization

- 2011: Recipient, Living Legacy Award

NAACP Image Awards

- 1996: Won, Outstanding Youth Actor/Actress – The Fresh Prince of Bel-Air
- 1997: Nominated, Outstanding Youth Actor/Actress – The Fresh Prince of Bel-Air
- 2010: Nominated, Outstanding Actress in a Daytime Drama – The Young and the Restless
- 2011: Nominated, Outstanding Actress in a Comedy Series – Love That Girl!
- 2011: Won, Outstanding Actress in a Daytime Drama – The Young and the Restless
- 2012: Won, Outstanding Actress in a Daytime Drama – The Young and the Restless
- 2012: Nominated, Outstanding Actress in a Comedy Series – Love That Girl!
- 2013: Nominated, Outstanding Actress in a Comedy Series – Love That Girl!

Nickelodeon Kids' Choice Awards

- 1996: Nominated, Favorite Television Actress – The Fresh Prince of Bel-Air

Young Artist Awards

- 1991: Won, Outstanding Young Comedienne in a Television Series – The Fresh Prince of Bel-Air
- 1992: Nominated, Outstanding Young Comedienne in a Television Series – The Fresh Prince of Bel-Air
- 1993: Nominated, Outstanding Young Comedienne in a Television Series – The Fresh Prince of Bel-Air
- 1994: Nominated, Outstanding Young Comedienne in a Television Series – The Fresh Prince of Bel-Air
- 1995: Nominated, Outstanding Young Comedienne in a Television Series – Name Your Adventure
