= Daydreamin' (Tatyana Ali song) =

1998 single by Tatyana Ali

Single by Tatyana Ali

from the album Kiss the Sky
- B-side: "Daydreamin' Part II"; "Never Leave You Lonely"
- Released: June 30, 1998
- Studio: Enterprise II (Burbank, California); Pacifique (North Hollywood, Los Angeles)
- Genre: Hip hop; R&B
- Length: 5:00 (album version); 4:02 (single edit)
- Label: MJJ Music; Work; Epic
- Songwriters: Rodney Jerkins; LaShawn Daniels; Fred Jerkins III; Peter Pankey; Sean Hamilton; Donald Fagen; Walter Becker
- Producer: Rodney Jerkins

Tatyana Ali singles chronology
"Daydreamin'" (1998)	"Boy You Knock Me Out" (1999)

Audio
- "Daydreamin'" on YouTube

"Daydreamin'" is a song by American actress and singer Tatyana Ali, written by Rodney Jerkins, LaShawn Daniels, Fred Jerkins, Peter Pankey, and Sean Hamilton. Featuring a sample of the Steely Dan song "Black Cow", the song includes an uncredited rap from Pankey and Hamilton, also known as Lord Tariq and Peter Gunz. "Daydreamin'" was released through Work Group and Michael Jackson's MJJ Music label on June 30, 1998, as the lead single from Ali's only studio album, Kiss the Sky (1998). The song peaked at number six in both the United States and United Kingdom while becoming a top-five hit in Canada and New Zealand. The single was certified gold in the US and New Zealand.

== Background ==
Following the conclusion of American sitcom The Fresh Prince of Bel-Air, lead actor Will Smith persuaded co-star Tatyana Ali, who played the character of Ashley Banks on the program, to embark on a music career. "Daydreamin'" was written by Rodney Jerkins, LaShawn Daniels, and Fred Jerkins, as well as Peter Pankey and Sean Hamilton of Lord Tariq and Peter Gunz, who perform an uncredited rap verse on the song. The track includes a sample of the Steely Dan song "Black Cow", so band members Donald Fagen and Walter Becker are given writing credits. Ali recorded the track at Enterprise II and Pacifique Studios in Los Angeles. The song became a US hit shortly after Ali had enrolled in Harvard University, but she decided to stay in school since she had taken a year off from education to record Kiss the Sky, choosing to promote her music during the weekends.

== Release ==
MJJ Records and Work Group first tested the song's commercial appeal by providing Los Angeles radio station KPWR with a copy of the song. Following positive reception, KYLD in San Francisco picked up the track, and airplay subsequently spread further. According to KKBT music director Dorsey Fuller, the song was a radio hit because of its jovial tone, lack of references to violence and sex, and compatible rap from a hip hop artist. Mix shows also helped the song gain popularity. "Daydreamin'" was officially serviced to US rhythmic contemporary and urban radio on June 30, 1998, and it was released to retail on July 21, 1998. On August 25, the track was sent to contemporary hit radio. In the United Kingdom, MJJ Music and Epic Records released the single as a CD and cassette on November 2, 1998.

== Chart performance ==
"Daydreamin'" became Ali's only song to chart on the US Billboard Hot 100, debuting at number 20 on August 8, 1998, and peaking at number six five weeks later. After spending 17 issues on the Hot 100, the song left the chart, appearing at number 55 on the Hot 100's year-end edition for 1998. The song also appeared on two other Billboard rankings, peaking at number five on the Hot R&B Singles chart and number two on the Rhythmic Top 40. On August 24, 1998, the Recording Industry Association of America (RIAA) certified the song gold for shipping over 500,000 units in the US. In Canada, the song reached number five in September 1998 and spent seven weeks on the Canadian Singles Chart while also peaking at number two on the RPM Urban Top 30.

Outside North America, the song charted in the United Kingdom and New Zealand. "Daydreamin'" appeared on New Zealand's RIANZ Singles Chart first, debuting at its peak of number three on October 11, 1998. It spent a total of four weeks in the top 10 and 13 weeks on the chart altogether, giving Ali her highest-charting single there, and was awarded a gold disc by Recording Industry Association of New Zealand (RIANZ) for selling over 5,000 copies. At the end of the year, RIANZ ranked it at number 47 on their year-end chart. In the UK, the single debuted at number six, its peak, on the UK Singles Chart in November 1998 and remained on the listing for nine weeks; it is Ali's second-most successful single there, after "Boy You Knock Me Out".

== Track listings ==
US CD and cassette single

1. "Daydreamin'" (single edit)
2. "Daydreamin' Part II"

UK CD1

1. "Daydreamin'" (single edit) – 4:02
2. "Daydreamin'" (radio edit without rap) – 3:40
3. "Never Leave You Lonely" – 4:23
4. "Daydreamin'" (video)

UK CD2

1. "Daydreamin'" (album version) – 4:59
2. "Daydreamin' Part II" (extended) – 5:25
3. "Daydreamin' (Daydreamin' Again)" – 5:12

UK cassette single

1. "Daydreamin'" (radio edit without rap) – 3:40
2. "Never Leave You Lonely" – 4:23

European CD1

1. "Daydreamin'" (without rap) – 3:40
2. "Daydreamin'" (single edit) – 4:02

European CD2

1. "Daydreamin'" (without rap) – 3:40
2. "Daydreamin'" (single edit) – 4:02
3. "Daydreamin' Part II" (extended version) – 5:25

Australian CD single

1. "Daydreamin'" (single edit)
2. "Daydreamin'" (without rap)
3. "Daydreamin' Part II"
4. "Daydreamin'" (acapella)
5. "Daydreamin'" (instrumental)

== Credits and personnel ==
Credits are taken from the Kiss the Sky album booklet.

Studios

- Recorded at Enterprise II (Burbank, California) and Pacifique Studios (North Hollywood, Los Angeles)
- Mixed at Pacifique Studios (North Hollywood, Los Angeles)

Personnel

- Rodney Jerkins – writing, music, vocal production and arrangement, engineering
- LaShawn Daniels – writing, vocal production and arrangement, engineering
- Fred Jerkins III – writing
- Peter Pankey – writing, uncredited vocals
- Sean Hamilton – writing, uncredited vocals
- Donald Fagen – writing ("Black Cow")
- Walter Becker – writing ("Black Cow")
- Tatyana Ali – lead vocals, background vocals
- TYE-V – background vocals
- Dexter Simmons – mixing
- Victor McCoy – assistant engineering

== Charts ==
=== Weekly charts ===
Chart (1998)	Peak position
Canada (Nielsen SoundScan)	5
Canada Dance/Urban (RPM)	2
Europe (Eurochart Hot 100)	36
New Zealand (Recorded Music NZ)	3
Scottish Singles Sales (Official Charts)	36
UK Singles (Official Charts)	6
UK Hip Hop/R&B (Official Charts)	3
US Billboard Hot 100 (Billboard)	6
US Hot R&B Singles (Billboard)	5
US Rhythmic Top 40 (Billboard)	2

=== Year-end charts ===
Chart (1998)	Position
New Zealand (RIANZ)	47
UK Urban (Music Week)	40
US Billboard Hot 100	55

== Certifications ==
Region	Certification	Certified units/sales
New Zealand (RMNZ)	Gold	5,000^{*}
United States (RIAA)	Gold	500,000^{^}
^{*} Sales figures based on certification alone.^{^} Shipments figures based on certification alone.

== Release history ==
Region	Date	Format(s)	Label(s)	Ref.
United States	June 30, 1998	Rhythmic contemporary; urban radio	MJJ; Work	
United States	July 21, 1998	CD; cassette	MJJ; Work	
United States	August 25, 1998	Contemporary hit radio	MJJ; Work	
United Kingdom	November 2, 1998	CD; cassette	MJJ; Epic	
