= Kiss the Sky (Tatyana Ali album) =

Studio album by Tatyana Ali
- Released: August 25, 1998
- Recorded: 1997–1998
- Genres: R&B; soul; hip hop
- Length: 50:30
- Labels: MJJ Music; 550; Work; Epic; Sony
- Producers: Shawn Stockman, Rodney Jerkins, Narada Michael Walden, Fred Jerkins III, StoneBridge, Vincent Herbert & Rob Fusari, Keith Pelzer & Darren Henson, Marti Sharron & Danny Sembello, James "Jiff" Hinger, Joe "P" Cantrall, Alex "Cat" Cantrall,

Singles from Kiss the Sky
- 1. "Daydreamin'" Released: June 30, 1998; 2. "Boy You Knock Me Out" Released: February 1, 1999; 3. "Everytime" Released: June 22, 1999

Professional ratings
Review scores
| Source | Rating |
|---|---|
| AllMusic | 2.5/5 stars |

Kiss the Sky is the only studio album by American singer and actress Tatyana Ali. The album was released on August 25, 1998, peaking at number 106 on the Billboard 200 and number 47 on Billboard's Top R&B/Hip-Hop Albums chart. The album produced the top ten Billboard Hot 100 hit "Daydreamin'", as well as the UK hit single "Boy You Knock Me Out", and the ballad "Everytime". The album did not sell as well as expected, and as such, Ali was dropped from the label in late 1999. The album was made with the help of her Fresh Prince co-star and rapper Will Smith.

== Track listing ==
| No. | Title | Writer(s) | Length |
|---|---|---|---|
| 1. | "Intro" | Shawn Stockman | 0:30 |
| 2. | "Boy You Knock Me Out" | Robert Bell; Ronald Bell; George Brown; Bobby Caldwell; Raymond Calhoun; Alfons Kettner; Robert Mickens; Kelly Price; Claydes Smith; Will Smith; Alton Taylor; Dennis Thomas; Richard Westfield | 4:10 |
| 3. | "If You Only Knew" | Mary Brown; Rob Fusari; Tatyana Ali; Vincent Herbert | 3:44 |
| 4. | "Everytime" | Alex Cantrall; Joe Priolo | 5:15 |
| 5. | "Daydreamin'" (featuring Lord Tariq & Peter Gunz) | Donald Fagen; Fred Jenkins III; LaShawn Daniels; Peter Pankey; Rodney Jerkins; Sean Hamilton; Walter Becker | 5:00 |
| 6. | "Love the Way You Love Me" | Narada Michael Walden; Sally Jo Dakota | 5:02 |
| 7. | "Interlude" | Shawn Stockman | 1:13 |
| 8. | "He Loves Me" | Darren "Limitless" Henson; Keith Pelzer; Tia Mintze | 4:45 |
| 9. | "Kiss the Sky" | Shawn Stockman | 5:04 |
| 10. | "If I Ever Love Again" | Danny Sembello; Marti Sharron | 4:44 |
| 11. | "Yesterday" (featuring Chico DeBarge) | Fred Jerkins III; Kelly Price | 5:06 |
| 12. | "Through Life Alone" | Shawn Stockman | 5:52 |
| Total length: | | | 50:23 |

European reissue bonus track
| No. | Title | Writer(s) | Length |
|---|---|---|---|
| 13. | "Boy You Knock Me Out" (featuring Will Smith) | Robert Bell; Ronald Bell; George Brown; Bobby Caldwell; Raymond Calhoun; Alfons Kettner; Robert Mickens; Kelly Price; Claydes Smith; Will Smith; Alton Taylor; Dennis Thomas; Richard Westfield | 4:20 |

Japanese Edition bonus tracks
| No. | Title | Writer(s) | Length |
|---|---|---|---|
| 13. | "Never Leave You Lonely" | Rob Fusari, Vincent Herbert | 4:23 |
| 14. | "Daydreamin' Part II" | Art Nevile, Fred Jerkins III, George Porter, Jr., Joseph Modeliste, Lashawn Daniels, Leo Nocentelli, Peter Pankey, Rodney Jerkins, Sean Hamilton | 4:24 |

== Production and personnel ==
- Track 2 Arranged and produced by StoneBridge (for StoneBridge Productions & Big Management Ltd.) & Kelly Price (for Priceless Music). Recorded by StoneBridge & Michael Blum. Mixed by Rob Chiarelli for Final Mix. All Programming by Rob Chiarelli.
- Track 3 Produced by Vincent Herbert, Rob Fusari & Mary Brown. Recorded by Commissioner Gordon; assisted by Tim Lauber & Jan Fairchild. Mixed by Tony Maserati. Eric Jackson: Guitars
- Track 4 Produced by Joe Priolo & A. Cantrall for Signature Productions. Recorded by John "Sticky Fingers" Smeltz. Mixed by Rob Chiarelli. Randy Bowland: Guitars. All other instruments and programming by Joe Priolo. Strings by The Larry Gold Players; arranged & conducted by Larry Gold.
- Track 5 Arranged, produced and recorded by Rodney Jerkins & LaShawn Daniels. Mixed by Dexter Simmons. All Music Performed by Rodney Jerkins.
- Track 6 Arranged and produced by Narada Michael Walden. Engineered by Marc Reyburn, Jimi Fischer & David Frazer. Mixed by David Frazer. Jimi Fischer, Rob Chiarelli: All Keyboards & Programming. Angela Bofill, Tina Gibson, Nikita Germaine & Sandy Griffith: Vocal Backing
- Track 8 Arranged by Tia Minze & Keith Pelzer. Produced by Keith Pelzer. Recorded by Keith Pelzer & Serban Ghenea. Mixed by Dexter Simmons.
- Tracks 9 & 12 Arranged, produced and performed by Shawn Stockman. Recorded by James Hinger & Rob Chiarelli. Mixed by Shawn Stockman & James Hinger.
- Track 10 Arranged and produced by Marti Sharron & Danny Sembello. Recorded by Jon Ingoldsby, Thom Russo & Martin Horenburg. Mixed by Dave Way. Jubu: Guitars. Sheree Ford-Payne: Vocal Backing
- Track 11 Arranged and produced By Kelly Price & Fred Jerkins III. Recorded by John Smeltz & Ben Garrison. Mixed by Fred Jerkins III & Dexter Simmons. Strings (The Darkchild Orchestra) arranged by Larry Gold & Fred Jerkins III. Chico DeBarge: Co-lead vocal. Kelly Price: Vocal Backing.

== Singles chart positions ==
List of singles, with selected chart positions and certifications
| Title | Year | Peak chart positions | | | | | | | | | Certifications |
| Title | Year | US | US R&B | BEL | FRA | IRL | NL | NZ | UK | UK R&B | Certifications |
|---|---|---|---|---|---|---|---|---|---|---|---|
| "Daydreamin'" | 1998 | 6 | 5 | — | — | — | — | 3 | 6 | 3 | RIAA: Gold; RMNZ: Gold |
| "Boy You Knock Me Out" (featuring Will Smith) | 1998 | — | 68 | 56 | 32 | 19 | 77 | 12 | 3 | 1 | RMNZ: Gold; BPI: Silver |
| "Everytime" | 1999 | — | 73 | — | — | — | — | — | 20 | 4 | |
"—" denotes releases that did not chart or were not released in that territory.
