= Everytime (Tatyana Ali song) =

1999 single by Tatyana Ali

Single by Tatyana Ali

from the album Kiss the Sky
- Released: June 7, 1999
- Length: 5:16
- Label: MJJ; Work
- Songwriters: Joe Priolo; Alex Cantrall
- Producers: Joe "P"; Alex "Cat" Cantrall

Tatyana Ali singles chronology
"Boy You Knock Me Out" (1999)	"Everytime" (1999)

"Everytime" is a song by American actress and singer Tatyana Ali, written and produced by Joe Priolo and Alex Cantrall. It was released as the third and final single from Ali's debut album, Kiss the Sky. The song reached number 20 on the UK singles chart in June 1999 and peaked at number 73 on the US Billboard Hot R&B Singles & Tracks chart the following month.

== Charts ==
Chart (1999)	Peak position
Europe (Eurochart Hot 100)	80
Scotland Singles (OCC)	47
UK Singles (OCC)	20
UK Hip Hop/R&B (OCC)	4
US Hot R&B Singles & Tracks (Billboard)	73

== Release history ==
Region	Date	Format(s)	Label(s)	Ref.
United States	May 11, 1999	Rhythmic contemporary; contemporary hit radio	MJJ; Work	
United Kingdom	June 7, 1999	CD; cassette	MJJ; Epic	
