= Kathleen Stewart (anthropologist) =

American Anthropologist and contributor to Affect theory

- Known for: Ethnography, affect theory

Academic work
- Discipline: Anthropology

Kathleen Stewart is an American Anthropologist, known for her association with Affect theory, emphasis on ethnographic writing, and collaborations with literary scholar Lauren Berlant. She is professor emerita at the University of Texas, Austin.

Her ethnographic fieldwork has taken place in West Virginia, Las Vegas, and Orange County, and since 1988 at disperse locations across America, using a method referred to by some Anthropologists as "multi-sited ethnography." She is considered to be part of the critical turn in Anthropology of the 1980s, inspired by insights from post-structuralist thought and literary theory, as well as an earlier tendency of reflexive Anthropology, such as that of James Clifford and Clifford Geertz. James Clifford's edited volume Writing Culture: The Poetics and Politics of Ethnography is often cited as marking a turn in ethnographic writing towards the postmodern. Stewart's style of ethnographic writing is literary and experimental.

Describing her methodology, Stewart has claimed that

Step one is to get out of the way, stop the noise of preconceived academic concepts of culture, structure, the body, community, et cetera, concepts that are designed as good-enough shorthand, employed for the sake of argument. But these concepts are not good enough if what you want is to follow the singularities of what’s happening in a present moment. Suspend the apparatus, edit down your description to cut the run-on clusters of social-science words, and the question of thought can re-emerge. When more than just an academic deployment, what’s a concept but an active experiment with an event that’s already moving and composing on its own? What’s a conceptualisation adequate to what’s thrown together in scenes, events, characters, aesthetics, forces and situations? An artist experiments with what colour or texture or timbre can do; the materials are the artist’s medium. In the same way, an ethnographic practice can produce thought with and through the very same forms, sensibilities and bodies with which the people living through the scene being described sense and act. In various ethnographic experiments in writing, imaging, sensing-out, I’ve tried to see what is capable of holding open a space for thought and feeling. I say experiment because there’s no predicting what an approach will bring to bear, what a form of attending will do.

Her first book, A Space on the Side of the Road: Cultural Poetics in An(other) America (1996) emerged from her doctoral fieldwork in the coal mining camps of West Virginia.

== Education ==
Stewart earned her B.A. in anthropology from the University of Massachusetts, Amherst, in 1979, and her Ph.D. in anthropology from the University of Michigan in 1988.

== Career & Work ==
=== West Virginia Fieldwork ===
Stewart's first book A Space on the Side of the Road: Cultural Poetics in An(other) America emerged from her fieldwork in West Virginia, where she focused on the culture of storytelling in Appalachian culture, and how it became a mode of expression for tragedy and history. In addition to fieldwork and extensive transcriptions of Appalachian vernacular, Stewart uses other philosophical and theoretical references throughout the text, most notably Walter Benjamin and his theses on history.

The book is marked by a reflexive relation to the practice and culture of storytelling, with Stewart remarking on how her presence as an ethnographer involves mediating stories in a manner similar to how the community she studies does with each other. In one passage she describes how her own involvement in a car crash leads to her acceptance by some of her subjects, as she had acquired meaning within their culture of storytelling:

By the time I got to my second storytelling stop on my way up the mountain, I had the impression that the Millers had already heard the story though no one ever said so or gave any overt sign. I don't remember how I realized this, though there may be precise observations in my notes. And it may be that I just imagined it, but what is the difference? All along the road I realized/imagined that the Lillys and the Walkers and Miss Cadle already had a version, or for all I knew, many versions of the near miss. I remember the strange, doubled sensation of being both subject and object of the story as “event” entered the space of retelling and was caught in the inescapable grafting of versions and voices. (Stewart 1996, 78).

=== Las Vegas Fieldwork & Contributions to Affect Theory ===
Stewart's fieldwork in Las Vegas marked a transition in her work to a focus on affect, atmosphere, and everyday life that would continue throughout her career. Focusing on the experience of service labor, urban sprawl, and exhaustion in the city, her interests would develop into her later multi-sited ethnographic work on attunement and the generative nature of everyday life. During this period, she is noted for helping to theorize economic and social precarity from the perspective of Anthropological critique.

Her 1996 article Cultural Poesis: The Generativity of Emergent Things argues that practices of everyday life should be treated with serious ethnographic attention. She states that ordinary ways of life contain within them creative and generative acts, and argues for a form of writing in response that mimics the creativity of living "as if the writing were itself a form of life." The article marked the beginning of the fragementary and episodic style that Stewart would take up in her book Ordinary Affects,

Stewart's book 2007 book Ordinary Affects, which draws upon her observations of Las Vegas, engages with Affect theory by introducing her concept of "the ordinary." According to Stewart, her book is an attempt to map "force, or affects, of encounters, desires, bodily states, dream worlds, and modes of attention and distraction." Stewart defines the ordinary as. 'public feelings that begin and end in circulation'; she invokes this focus in the form of her book, which is composed of prose-fragments and ethnographic vignettes.

In 2010, Stewart wrote the afterword for the first compendium of critical theory writings about Affect theory, The Affect Theory Reader. Although continuous with earlier discussions of affect in Philosophy, like those conducted by Spinoza, Henri Bergson, and Gilles Deleuze, Affect theory is often used as a shorthand for what is often referred to as 'the affective turn,' a loose movement in the social sciences and humanities since the 1990s that focuses on forms of experience and embodiment that are ingnored in more traditional accounts of semiotics and representational analysis. Stewart's afterword, "Worlding Refrains," underscores the ethos of the volume's collected essays through a series of meta-reflections and ethnographic fragments concerning everyday life. Towards the beginning of the piece, Stewart offer her reflections on the value of Affect from the perspective of Anthropology:

"Affect is the commonplace, labor-intensive process of sensing modes of living as they come into being. It hums with the background noise of obstinacies and promises, ruts and disorientations, intensities and resting points. It stretches across real and imaginary social fields and sediments, linlting some kind of everything. This is why there is nothing dead or inconsequential in even the flightiest of lifestyles or the starkest of circumstances. The lived spaces and temporalities of home, work, school, blame, adventure, illness, rumination, pleasure, downtime, and release are the rhythms of the present as a compositional event -one already weighted with the buzz of atmospheric fill."

Her focus on Affect Theory continued with her writing experiments produced in collaboration with literary theorist Lauren Berlant. Berlant is noted for her contributions to Affect theory in books such as Cruel Optimism. The Hundreds collects these writing experiments, made under the creative constraint of 100-word fragments of prose. This is similar to Stewart's teaching practice, as she is known for making both her undergraduate and graduate students write 500-work passages to workshop out loud together, something she claims was inspired by her involvement in the Public Feelings writing group at the University of Texas. Stewart and Berlant performed excerpts from this writing project at the 2015 Affect: Worlding, Tensions, Futures Conference which was organized by the editors of the Affect Theory Reader.

== Critical reception ==
Stewart has been described as part of the Affective turn in ethnography, and she is known for her poetic and literary approach. Some commentators have criticized Stewart's focus for being bound to an abstracted way of understanding the world, or of being overly reflexive to the point that she reproduces the Anthropological essentialism she hopes to escape. This has included broader critique of the focus on affect as being particular to Western contexts, even when introduced as universal.

Upon her retirement from University of Texas Austin, students and colleagues of Stewart wrote "Hundreds for Katie," a multi-authored project dedicated to Stewart's work as an ethnographer and educational mentor. It was published in the journal Anthropology and Humanism in 2023.

In 2025, a panel took place at the American Anthropological Association, "Ghosts," dedicated to Stewart's life and work. Organized by Anthropologist Susan Lepselter, the panel was titled "Writing into Ordinary Ghosts: Papers Honoring the Work of Kathleen Stewart." Presenters included Megan Gette, Joseph Russo, Lindsey Freeman, Laura Ogden, and Marina Peterson.

== Selected Publications ==
=== Books ===
- Stewart, Kathleen (2007). Ordinary affects. Durham, NC: Duke University Press. ISBN 978-0-8223-4088-1.

=== Articles ===
- 2006. “Ordinary Resonance in Uncharted Territories: An Experiment in Finding Missing Cultural Pieces.” In Uncharted Territories, edited by Orvar Löfgren,
- 2005. “Where the Past Meets the Future and Time Stands Still.” In Histories of the Future, edited by Susan Harding and Daniel Rosenberg, Durham, NC: Duke University Press, 2005.
- 2005. "Cultural Poesis: The Generativity of Emergent Things.” In Handbook of Qualitative Research, 3rd ed., edited by Norman Denzin and Yvonna Lincoln. Thousand Oaks, CA: Sage,.
- “ 2004. Signs.” In Encyclopedia of Appalachia, edited by Rudy Abramson and Judy Haskell. Knoxville: University of Tennessee Press, 2004.
- “Still Life.” In Women on the Verge of Home, edited by Belinda Straight. Albany: SUNY Press, 2004.
- “The Perfectly Ordinary Life.” In Public Sentiments: Memory, Trauma, History, Action. Scholar and Feminist Online 2, no. 1 (Summer 2003).
- Stewart, Kathleen, and Susan Harding. “Anxieties of Influence.” In Transparency and Conspiracy: Ethnographies of Suspicion in the New World Order, edited by Todd Saunders and Harry West. Durham, NC: Duke University Press, 2003.
- Stewart, Kathleen. “Arresting Images.” In Aesthetic Subjects: Pleasures, Ideologies, and Ethics, edited by Pamela Matthews and David McWhirter. Minneapolis: University of Minnesota Press, 2003.
- ———. “Scenes of Life.” Public Culture 14, no. 2 (2002).
