= Boy You Knock Me Out =

1999 single by Tatyana Ali

Single by Tatyana Ali

from the album Kiss the Sky
- B-side: "Love the Way You Love Me"
- Released: February 1, 1999
- Studio: StoneBridge Productions (Stockholm, Sweden); Titan (Sherman Oaks, Los Angeles)
- Length: 4:10 (album version); 4:00 (single edit); 3:41 (radio edit)
- Label: MJJ Music; Work; Epic
- Songwriters: Kelly Price; StoneBridge; Nick Nice; Alfons Kettner; Bobby Caldwell; Alton Taylor; Robert Mickens; Kool & the Gang
- Producer: StoneBridge

Tatyana Ali singles chronology
| "Daydreamin'" (1998) | "Boy You Knock Me Out" (1999) | "Everytime" (1999) |

Audio
- "Boy You Knock Me Out" on YouTube

"Boy You Knock Me Out" is a song by American actress and singer Tatyana Ali from her only studio album, Kiss the Sky (1998). Written by Kelly Price, StoneBridge, and Nick Nice, the track samples "Summer Madness" by Kool & the Gang and interpolates "What You Won't Do for Love" by Bobby Caldwell. Released via MJJ Music and Epic Records on February 1, 1999, the song reached number three on the UK Singles Chart and entered the top 40 of the charts in France, Iceland, Ireland, and New Zealand. The single version of the song, known as the "Big Willie Style" edit, features Will Smith performing a rap.

== Background ==
Tatyana Ali was recruited by her co-star on The Fresh Prince of Bel-Air, Will Smith, to launch her own music career, and she postponed attending Harvard University so she could record Kiss the Sky. "Boy You Knock Me Out" was written by Kelly Price, Nick Nice, and StoneBridge, who also produced the song. The track samples elements from Kool & the Gang's 1974 instrumental "Summer Madness"—written by the band, Alton Taylor, and Robert Mickens—and interpolates Bobby Caldwell's 1978 song "What You Won't Do for Love"—written by Caldwell and Alfons Kettner. Ali recorded the track at StoneBridge Productions in Stockholm, Sweden, and at Titan Recording Studio in Sherman Oaks, Los Angeles. Smith performs a rap verse on the "Big Willie Style" single version.

== Release and reception ==
Although MJJ Music and Work Group serviced "Boy You Knock Me Out" to US radio in October 1998, it did not chart on the Billboard Hot 100 like its predecessor, "Daydreamin'". The single did appear on the Billboard Hot R&B Singles & Tracks and Rhythmic Top 40 charts, stalling at numbers 68 and 40, respectively, in January 1999. On February 1, 1999, the single was released in the United Kingdom and became Ali's highest-charting song, debuting and peaking at number three on the UK Singles Chart six days after its release. In Ireland, the single reached number 19. The song entered the top 10 in Iceland, peaking at number six in March 1999. That same month, the single peaked at number 12 in New Zealand and number 32 in France. "Boy You Knock Me Out" was certified gold in New Zealand (5,000 sales) and silver in the UK (200,000 shipments).

== Track listings ==
UK CD1

1. "Boy You Knock Me Out" (Big Willie Style single edit) – 4:00
2. "Boy You Knock Me Out" (Master Urban remix) – 4:08
3. "Love the Way You Love Me" – 5:02
4. "Boy You Knock Me Out" (video)

UK CD2

1. "Boy You Knock Me Out" (Big Willie Style extended single) – 4:21
2. "Boy You Knock Me Out" (Maurice's Xclusive club mix) – 9:00
3. "Boy You Knock Me Out" (Stone's extended version) – 5:20

UK cassette single

1. "Boy You Knock Me Out" (Big Willie Style single edit) – 4:00
2. "Love the Way You Love Me" – 5:02
3. "Boy You Knock Me Out" (Master Urban remix) – 4:08

European CD1

1. "Boy You Knock Me Out" (Big Willie Style single edit) – 4:00
2. "Boy You Knock Me Out" (Maurice's radio mix) – 4:00

European CD2

1. "Boy You Knock Me Out" (Big Willie Style single edit) – 4:00
2. "Boy You Knock Me Out" (Maurice's radio mix) – 4:00
3. "Boy You Knock Me Out" (Maurice's Xclusive club mix) – 9:00
4. "Boy You Knock Me Out" (Maurice's Xclusive instrumental) – 9:00
5. "Boy You Knock Me Out" (video)

Australian CD single

1. "Boy You Knock Me Out" (single edit)
2. "Boy You Knock Me Out" (Master Urban remix)
3. "Boy You Knock Me Out" (Maurice's radio mix)
4. "Boy You Knock Me Out" (Maurice's Xclusive club mix)

== Credits and personnel ==
Credits are taken from the Kiss the Sky album booklet.

Studios

- Recorded at StoneBridge Productions (Stockholm, Sweden) and Titan Recording Studio (Sherman Oaks, Los Angeles)
- Mixed at Enterprise II Studio (Burbank, California)

Personnel

- Kelly Price – writing, background vocals, vocal production and arrangement
- StoneBridge – writing, production, vocal production and arrangement, engineering
- Nick Nice – writing
- Alfons Kettner – writing ("What You Won't Do for Love")
- Bobby Caldwell – writing ("What You Won't Do for Love")
- Alton Taylor – writing ("Summer Madness")
- Robert Mickens – writing ("Summer Madness")
- Robert "Kool" Bell – writing ("Summer Madness")
- Dennis Thomas – writing ("Summer Madness")
- Richard Westfield – writing ("Summer Madness")
- George Brown – writing ("Summer Madness")
- Claydes Charles Smith – writing ("Summer Madness")
- Tatyana Ali – lead vocals, background vocals
- Will Smith – rap (Big Willie Style version)
- Rob Chiarelli – additional programming, mixing
- Michael Blum – engineering

== Charts ==
=== Weekly charts ===
| Chart (1999) | Peak position |
|---|---|
| Belgium (Ultratip Bubbling Under Flanders) | 6 |
| Europe (Eurochart Hot 100) | 14 |
| France (SNEP) | 32 |
| Iceland (Íslenski Listinn Topp 40) | 6 |
| Ireland (IRMA) | 19 |
| Netherlands (Dutch Top 40 Tipparade) | 21 |
| Netherlands (Single Top 100) | 77 |
| New Zealand (Recorded Music NZ) | 12 |
| Scotland Singles (OCC) | 10 |
| UK Singles (OCC) | 3 |
| UK Hip Hop/R&B (OCC) | 1 |
| US Hot R&B Singles & Tracks (Billboard) | 68 |
| US Rhythmic Top 40 (Billboard) | 40 |

=== Year-end charts ===
| Chart (1999) | Position |
|---|---|
| UK Singles (OCC) | 107 |

== Certifications ==
| Region | Certification | Certified units/sales |
|---|---|---|
| New Zealand (RMNZ) | Gold | 5,000^{*} |
| United Kingdom (BPI) | Silver | 200,000^{^} |
^{*} Sales figures based on certification alone.^{^} Shipments figures based on certification alone.

== Release history ==
| Region | Date | Format(s) | Label(s) | Ref. |
|---|---|---|---|---|
| United States | October 26, 1998 | Urban radio | MJJ Music; Work | |
| United States | November 3, 1998 | Rhythmic contemporary radio | MJJ Music; Work | |
| United Kingdom | February 1, 1999 | CD; cassette | MJJ Music; Epic | |
| United States | February 2, 1999 | Contemporary hit radio | MJJ Music; Work | |
