= Laura Letinsky =

Canadian photographer

Laura L. Letinsky
- Born: 1962 (age 63–64); Winnipeg, Manitoba, Canada
- Education: University of Manitoba, Yale University
- Known for: Photographer
- Website: https://lauraletinsky.com/

Laura L. Letinsky (born 1962) is an artist and a professor in the Department of Visual Arts at the University of Chicago.^{[1]} She is currently based in Chicago, Illinois where she lives and works. Letinsky’s works contend with what and how a photograph “means” while engaging and challenging the notions of domesticity, gender, and consumption. She was included in the 2019 PHotoEspaña and is a Guggenheim fellow.

== Education ==
Letinsky was born in Winnipeg and received her BFA from the University of Manitoba in 1986 and MFA from Yale School of Art in 1991. She was awarded the Guggenheim Fellowship in 2000 and the Anonymous Was a Woman fellowship in 2001. She is currently a professor of visual arts at the University of Chicago.

== Work ==
=== Early work ===
In the 1990s, Letinsky largely photographed couples, which can be seen in her photographic series Venus Inferred. This work examined the legacy of religious pictorial traditions as they transitioned through the Enlightenment into secular imagery, specifically, that of romance and romantic love. The ontology of photographs as they relate to production and consumption became an increasing concern. Walker Evans is cited as an influence because of his interest in the vernacular, as are the artists, Garry Winogrand and Diane Arbus.

Stifled by the conundrum of the romance narrative with its inevitable failure, especially as it was relayed through the photograph, another kind of failure in that its promise would never be fulfilled, Letinsky transitioned to photographing still lifes. Following the tradition of Dutch-Flemish still life paintings of the Northern European Renaissance, Letinksy found room for exploration in "its association with the feminine, its characterization as 'less important,' its affiliations with domesticity and intimacy." She realized still lifes could "explore the tension between the small and minute and larger social structures." Referencing Jan Groover and Giorgio Morandi, this work interrogates the question of meaning as it relates to what is described in the image as compared to how it is described. That is, what the picture is about is not necessarily laminated onto what is being pictured. In the process of creating still life images, Letinsky developed a unique aesthetic recognized across her works.

In 2004, The Renaissance Society exhibited the long-term series she had been working on since 1997, Hardly More Than Ever, cementing her significance as a critically engaging contemporary artist.

=== 2010s ===
Letinsky stopped photographing for a year in 2009, opting to work in ceramics, textiles, and words. This turn to more material practice was related to her questions related to the photograph as image and as object. Returning to photography in 2010, she began work on another still-life series, Ill Form and Void Full. In this work, she sought to try to "restructure the desire [photography] engenders" by making overt that pictures beget other pictures, i.e. images inform subsequent images.

In 2019, Letinsky debuted her series, To Want For Nothing, in Chicago. These images marked a transition away from her domestic table settings and instead, using magazine and advertisement cutouts she creates composite images that explore form as it impacts narrative, and the unrelenting and overwhelming behemoth that is our image culture. Reviewing the series, writer Hugo Fortin says, "The conceptual and intricately composed photographs of the Canadian artist are reminders of her indisputable mastery in still life photography and reveal a sensibility that is at once powerful, tenuous and undeniably political."

During this time, Letinsky collaborated with artist John Paul Morabito on a series of textile projects, including Stain Napkins, 8 damask napkins each with the variant of a stain woven into them, and, the 2017 series titled Telephone Game, in which "the artists explore the relationships between photography and weaving, using digital interfaces to bring these two material outputs into direct communication."

Books

Following a show at the Renaissance Society at the University of Chicago, Letinsky released a monograph of the Hardly More Than Ever series that spanned from 1997–2004. In 2006, she released the book Now Again, which focused on Hardly More Than Ever and her most recent work at the time, Somewhere, Somewhere (2003–present).

In the 2010 photography book After All, Letinsky showcased an arrangement of her latest work, which included the series The Dog And The Wolf, To Say It Isn’t So, and Fall. In After All, "Letinsky explores photography's transformative quality, changing what is typically overlooked into something splendid in its resilience. Poet Mark Strand contributes an essay to this marvelous volume."

In partnership with Radius Books, Letinsky released two more books, Ill Form And Void and Time’s Assignation. For an essay in Time’s Assignation, curator Nathalie Herschdofer writes, "The Polaroid, now anachronistic, is here conjoined with Laura Letinsky's still life subject: the remains of appetites never entirely sated." The monograph Ill Form And Void, which includes all works from the series, "creates references to the table from existing photographs, Martha Stewart, Dwell and Good Housekeeping magazines, her old work, the art of friends, and actual objects. This process shows how ideas about the private sphere and their manifestation in our lives are always predicated upon what has come before: that is, perception itself is a construction." Reviewing the publication, Aline Smithson from Lenscratch said that the book "shifts the way we think of the classical still life."

=== 2020s ===
In 2022, continuing her ceramics work, Letinsky presented a new porcelain sculpture series titled Preparing for Flowers. Letinsky's porcelain work was "born from a desire for physicality, for a respite from the digital cacophony of contemporary life, for making simply for the sake of making." For these pieces, Letinsky drew inspiration from kintsugi, the Japanese art of repairing broken pottery.

Who Loves the Sun

The work in Letinsky's latest photography series, Who Loves the Sun, was made mostly during Letinsky’s 2023 residency in the South of France at La Maison Dora Maar and marked a return of sorts to a tradition of still life within a modernist and contemporary framework. An exhibition showcasing this work opened at the Yancey Richardson Gallery in NYC in 2024, titled For, And Because Of… In this series, "Letinsky utilized natural light together with artificial light to provide her images with a radiant glow. Her subjects included borrowed objects such as a ceramic vase and glassware from La Maison that may have belonged to Maar. The detritus left behind from other artists-in-residence, as well as flowers and weeds growing nearby also found their way into her images."

Speaking on the work, Letinsky explains, "I make pictures of very ordinary things in a way that destabilizes and questions the camera's authority while also indulging in its sexiness, solicitating a visual pleasure that is tethered to other senses." Extending these interests, she has made a series of tintypes from iphone images that, while in dialogue with the past (cubism, tintype technology) refer to the mutability of time and perspective. This work will be shown at Document Space, Lisbon in the autumn of 2024.

Reviewing the exhibition For, And Because Of…, art critic Vince Aletti wrote in the New Yorker, "Working mostly in la Maison Dora Maar in the South of France, she lets the light of Provence bleach her prints to abstraction. What remains are after-dinner jumbles of dirty plates, crumpled napkins, and wilted flowers, with the tabletops teetering and all but dissolved in a white-on-white aura that never strains to be painterly. The party's over, yet Letinsky sees not chaos but promise—and a genuine sense of renewal among the ruins."

Molosco

Continuing her ceramics work, in 2024, Letinsky launched Molosco, a porcelain dinnerware collection in collaboration with Big House Studio that she had begun in 2010. The Molosco collection draws inspiration from the humble mollusk, symbolizing the shelter and individuality these creatures carry within their shells. This connection is reflected in the Molosco dinnerware, which combines practicality with the unique aesthetic of Letinsky's artistic practice, challenging conventional notions of perfection and celebrating the unique marks of the maker’s hand. Molosco officially launched in March 2024 in a pop-up boutique at the Four Seasons Hotel in Chicago.

Letinsky and Molosco have collaborated with the culinary studio Txa Txa Club for their vis-à-vis dinner series, in which the different courses were "inspired by or created as a direct response to either the Molosco backstory or the dishes themselves."

== Solo exhibitions ==
- "For, and Because Of...", Yancey Richardson Gallery, NYC, 2024
- "About Things", Four Seasons Hotel, Chicago, IL, 2024
- "The Indignation of Counting Spiders", Document Gallery, Chicago, IL, 2022
- "Preparing for Flowers" (ceramics), Tracey Morgan Gallery, Asheville, NC, 2022
- "Guild Hall, revisited", Document Gallery, Chicago, IL, 2020
- "To Want For Nothing" exhibition at Yancey Richardson in New York, 2019
- "Time's Assignation", Musee des Beaux Arts, LeLocle, Switzerland, 2019
- Laura Letinsky and Sharon Core, Photo Espanà, Madrid, 2019
- Laura Letinsky, American Center, University of Shanghai Science & Technology, Shanghai, 2018
- Laura Letinsky, Singapore International Photography Festival, Singapore, 2018
- "Infinite Gamers", Open House Contemporary, Chicago, IL, 2017
- "Time's Assignation", Yancey Richardson Gallery, NYC; Document, Chicago, IL, 2017
- "Telephone Game", Document Projects, Chicago, IL, 2017
- "Telephone Game", Material Exchange Fair, Mexico City; Basel, Basel Design Fair; and Art Expo Chicago, 2017
- "57 Breaths", Skyline Design, NeoCon Fair, Chicago, IL, 2017
- "Betwixt and between", Tracey Morgan Gallery, Asheville, NC, 2017
- Still Life Photographs 1997–2012, School of Art Gallery, University of Manitoba, 2016
- "A Still Dialogue", Tanya Marcuse & Laura Letinsky, S. New Hampshire University, NH, 2016
- "Repository: Porcelain Urns", Castani Gallery, Art Expo, Chicago, IL, 2015
- Focus, Mumbai Photography Festival, Mumbai, India & A Moment on the Lips: Illinois State Museum Gallery, Normal, IL, 2015
- "STAIN": Collaboration with John Paul Morabito, Artware Editions, NYC, 2015
- "STAIN": Collaboration with John Paul Morabito, Kavi Gupta Editions & The Renaissance Society, Chicago, IL, 2015
- "Neither Necessary nor Natural", Focus, Mumbai Photography Festival, Mumbai, India, 2015
- "Yours, more pretty", Yancey Richardson Gallery, NYC, 2014
- "Creases Turn Sour", Carroll and Sons Gallery, Boston, 2014
- "Ill Form and Void Full", The Photographers Gallery, London, UK, 2013
- "Ill Form and Void Full", Museum of Contemporary Art, Chicago, 2012
- "Hot and Cold All Over", Joseph Carroll and Sons, Boston, 2012
- "Ill Form and Void Full", Yancey Richardson Gallery, NY; Valerie Carberry Gallery, Chicago, Museum of Hagen, Germany, 2012
- Laura Letinsky: Still Life Photographs, 1997–2012, Denver Museum of Art, CO, 2012
- "That What Matters", Museum of North Dakota, 2011
- "After All", Stephen Bulger Gallery, Toronto, 2011
- "Fall", Brancolini Grimaldi, Florence, Italy, 2011
- "The Dog and The Wolf", Monique Meloche Gallery, 2010
- "After All", Yancey Richardson Gallery, New York, 2010
- "Still", Galerie m Bochum, Germany, 2010
- "To Peach", Donald Young Gallery, Chicago, IL, 2010
- "To Want for Nothing", Brancolini Grimaldi Galerie, Rome, Italy, 2009
- "Likeness", James Hyman Gallery, London, England, 2009
- "Before the colours deepened and grew small", galerie mBochum, Bochum, Germany, 2008
- "Dirty Pretty Things", Brancolini Grimaldi Galerie, Rome, Italy, 2007
- "To Say It Isn't So", Yancey Richardson Gallery, NY, 2007
- "To Say It Isn't So", Monique Meloche Gallery, Chicago, 2007
- "Somewhere, Somewhere", Stephen Bulger Gallery, Toronto, Ontario, 2007
- "Hardly More Than Ever", M. Sturm Gallery, Stuttgart, 2006
- "Hardly More Than Ever", Joseph Bellows Gallery, La Jolla, CA, 2006
- "Somewhere, Somewhere", J. Harris Gallery, Seattle, WA, 2006
- "Somewhere, Somewhere", Oakville Galleries, Toronto, Ontario; Bright Design Showroom, Chicago, IL, 2006
- "Hardly More Than Ever", Galerie Kusseneers, Antwerp, Belgium, 2005
- "Somewhere, Somewhere", Monique Meloche Gallery, Chicago, IL, 2005
- "Hardly More Than Ever" at the Renaissance Society, 2004
- Aftermath: Still-life photographs by Laura Letinsky, Cleveland Museum of Art, 2004
- I did not remember I had forgotten, Edwynn Houk Gallery, New York, NY; Shine Gallery, London, England; Monique Meloche Gallery, Chicago, IL, 2003
- Morning, and Melancholia, Iowa University Gallery, Iowa, 2003
- Morning, and Melancholia, Edwynn Houk Gallery, NY; Jane Jackson, Atlanta; Copia: American Academy of Food and Wine, Napa Valley, 2002
- Venus Inferred-Self Portraits, Stephen Bulger Gallery, Toronto, 2002
- Some Things I Know, Gahlberg Gallery, College of DuPage, IL, 2002
- Laura Letinsky, Vox Gallery, Montreal, QUE, 2001
- Morning, and Melancholia, Carol Ehlers Gallery, Chicago, IL, 2000
- Venus Inferred, Bishop's University, Quebec, 1999
- Venus Inferred, Canadian Museum of Contemporary Photography (touring), Ottawa, ONT; Guy McIntyre Gallery, New York, NY, 1998
- Coupling, Museum of Contemporary Photography, Chicago, IL, 1997

== Collections ==
Her work is included in the collection of the Getty Museum, the Winnipeg Art Gallery, the Museum of Contemporary Art, Chicago and the Art Institute of Chicago.
