= Stephanie Brooks =

Contemporary American Artist

Stephanie Brooks (born 1970) is an American artist known for her conceptual and text-based artworks.

She obtained a Bachelor's in Fine Arts in 1994 from Ohio University in Athens, Ohio, and a Master's in Fine Arts in 1997 from the University of Illinois Chicago.

Currently based in Chicago, Illinois, Brooks has exhibited artwork both nationally and internationally at museums and galleries. Her work is included in the permanent collections of the Whitney Museum of American Art, Cleve Carney Museum of Art, and the Museum of Contemporary Art, Chicago. She has also exhibited work at the Chicago Cultural Center, Terrain Biennial, Peter Blum (New York), the Indianapolis Museum of Contemporary Art, and the Rhona Hoffman Gallery, whom she was signed with for several years throughout the 2000s and 2010s. She is currently a Professor in the Sculpture Department at the School of the Art Institute of Chicago.

== Artwork ==
In her own words, "My sculptural works are fueled by the visual, physical, verbal and written. Equations, equivalents, and norms are in distress and readdressed in my art practice. With my sculptures, I investigate and interrogate systems in our built, affective, textual, canonical and public environments. Through object-making, the works create complexities in order to expose the multiplicities of meaning inherent in the locations of forms. My artworks insert alternative narratives within, around and through the locations minimalism, building, abstraction, language, humor, and textuality."

Brooks engages in several ways of art-making including sculptural objects, writing, and public installations. Her work can be found throughout Chicago in many forms including the street such as a permanent billboard, which breaks down poem forms. Another billboard installation was a part of OVERRIDE, a 2016 Billboard project as part of Expo Chicago in which phrases such as "[Meaningful Glance]" were presented to the public through their everyday activities. Brooks has written several books including Love is a Certain Kind of Flower (2010), Poems & Poem Forms (2009), and I love you, whoever you are and wherever you are. You know who you are and you know what I mean! (2007). These books are published through various sources included The Green Lantern Press and Illinois State University.
