= Elizabeth Freeman (professor) =

American professor (1966–2024)

- Born: 31 December 1966
- Died: 2 June 2024 (aged 57)
- Occupation: Professor

Academic background
- Education: University of Chicago (MA, PhD), Oberlin College (BA)

Academic work
- Discipline: Queer studies, American literature
- Institutions: University of California, Davis, Sarah Lawrence College

Elizabeth Freeman (1966 – 2024) was an English professor at the University of California, Davis, having previously taught at Sarah Lawrence College. Freeman specialized in American literature and gender and queer studies. She served as associate dean of the Faculty for Humanities, Arts, and Cultural Studies at the University of California, Davis.

== Education ==
Freeman completed her bachelor's degree in English at Oberlin College in 1989, followed by an MA and PhD at the University of Chicago in 1991 and 1996 respectively. Freeman's doctoral dissertation was entitled The wedding complex: Sex norms and fantasy forms in modern American culture and was supervised by Lauren Berlant and Bill Brown. Freeman was an Andrew W. Mellon Postdoctoral Fellow in the Humanities at the University of Pennsylvania, where she conducted research for her work on weddings and taught undergraduate English classes.

== Career ==
Freeman's research was mostly in queer studies, which she personally believed was defined by sex while accepting a broader definition for the term - including those who had a different approach. She co-edited the book on Queer Kinship: Race, Sex, Belonging, Form with Teagan Bradway. Her article “Sacra/Mentality in Djuna Barnes’s Nightwood” received the 2014 Norman Foerster Prize for the best essay published in American Literature.

Freeman was co-editor of GLQ from 2011 until 2017. According to a book review by Ry Montgommery at the London School of Economics, Freeman's work took a "disruptive and inventive approach to questions of kinship, (post)coloniality and queerness."

== Life ==
Freeman's interest in queer theory developed from her engagement with HIV/AIDS activism in the early 1990s. Freeman died of cancer in June 2024, at the age of 57.

== Publications ==
=== Books ===
- The Wedding Complex: Forms of Belonging in Modern American Culture (Duke University Press, 2002).
- Time Binds: Queer Temporalities, Queer Histories (Duke University Press, 2010).
- Beside You in Time: Sense-Methods and Queer Sociabilities in Nineteenth-Century America (Duke University Press, 2019).

=== Chapters and articles ===
- “Parasymptomatic Reading: Medical Kink, Care, and the Surface/Depth Debate”. Differences: A Journal of Feminist Cultural Studies, vol. 34, no. 2, (2023).
- "The Queer Temporalities of Queer Temporalities". GLQ: A Journal of Lesbian and Gay Studies vol. 25, no. 1 (2019).
- "Shakers, Not Movers: The Physiopolitics of Shaker Dance". In Cindy Weinstein (ed.), A Question of Time: From Colonial Encounter to Contemporary Fiction (Cambridge University Press, 2018).
- "Afterward". In Kent Brintnall and Joseph Marchal (eds.), Sexual Disorientations: Queer Temporalities, Affects, Theologies (Fordham University Press, 2017).
- "Timing Sex in the Age of Digital Reproduction". New Formations special issue, no. 92 (2017).
- “Synchronic/Anachronic.” In Joel Burges and Amy Elias (eds.), Time: a Vocabulary of the Present (New York University Press, 2016).
- “Hopeless Cases: Queer Chronicities and Gertrude Stein’s ‘Melanctha’”. Journal of Homosexuality vol. 63, no. 3 (2016).
- “Connecticut Yankings: Mark Twain and the Masturbating Dude.” In Dana Luciano and Ivy Wilson (eds.), Unsettled States: Nineteenth Century American Literary Studies (New York University Press, 2014).
- “The Chronic: Renate Lorenz in Conversation with Mathias Danbolt and Elizabeth Freeman” (in German). Springerin, no. 1 (2014).
- “Lessons from Object Lessons”. Feminist Formations vol. 25, no. 3 (2013).
- “Never the Usual Terms: A Song for 21st Century Occupations,” written with Peter Coviello. In Social Text Periscope online dossier on “Work and Idleness in the Age of the Great Recession” (2013).
- “Normal Work: Temporal Drag and the Question of Class”. In Pauline Boudry and Renate Lorenz (eds.), Temporal Drag (Hatje Cantz Verlag, 2011).
- “Reimagining Gender and Sexuality”. In Leonard Cassuto (ed.), The Cambridge History of the American Novel (Cambridge University Press, 2011).
- “Sacramentality and the Lesbian Premodern.” In Noreen Giffneyet et al. (eds.), The Lesbian Premodern (Palgrave Macmillan, 2011).
- “'We’re Only Making Plans for Nigel': In Response to Didier Eribon”. Qui Parle vol. 18, no. 2 (2010).
- “Turn the Beat Around: Sadomasochism, Temporality, History”. differences vol. 19, no.1 (2008).
- "Still After". South Atlantic Quarterly vol. 106, no .3 (2007).
- "Queer Belongings: Kinship Theory and Queer Theory". In George Haggerty and Molly McGarry (eds.), A Companion to Lesbian, Gay, Bisexual, and Transgender Studies (Blackwell Publishers, 2007).
- "'Monsters, Inc.': Notes on the Neoliberal Arts Education". New Literary History vol. 36, no. 1 (2005).
- "Time Binds, or, Erotohistoriography". Social Text, nos. 84–85 (2005).
- "The Whole(y) Family: Economies of Kinship in the Progressive Era". American Literary History vol. 16, no. 4 (2004).
- "Queer Bonds". Concerns, no. 27 (2000).
- "Packing History, Count(er)ing Generations". New Literary History vol. 31, no. 4 (2000).
- “Honeymoon with a Stranger: Pedophiliac Picaresques from Poe to Nabokov”. American Literature vol. 70, no. 4 (1998).
- “‘The We of Me’: The Member of the Wedding’s Novel Alliances”. Women & Performance: A Journal of Feminist Theory vol. 8, no. 2 (1996).
- "Teaching Outside the Curriculum: Guerrilla Sex Education and the Public Schools", written with Anne-Elizabeth Murdy and Scott Mendel. Radical Teacher, no. 45 (1994).
- "'What Factory Girls Had Power to Do': The Techno-logic of Working Class Feminine Publicity in the Lowell Offering". Arizona Quarterly vol. 50, no. 2 (1994).
- "Queer Nationality", written with Lauren Berlant. Boundary 2 vol. 19, no. 1 (1992).

== Awards ==
- American Council of Learned Societies Fellowship, 2015
- Norman Foerster Prize for Best Essay in American Literature, 2014
- UC Davis Distinguished Graduate Teaching Award, 2013
- University of California President's Research Fellowship in the Humanities, 2006
- UC Davis Chancellor's Fellowship, 2005
- UC Davis Consortium for Women and Research Academic Senate Project Grant, 2004
- Penn Humanities Forum Mellon Postdoctoral Fellowship, 1999
- University of Chicago Mellon Dissertation Award (declined), 1995
- Mellon Fellowship in the Humanities, 1990
- Oberlin College Florence Snell Scholarship, 1988
