= Kenneth W. Warren =

American academic and author

Kenneth W. Warren is an American academic and author, who serves as the Fairfax M. Cone Distinguished Service Professor and the Associate Chair in the Department of English Language and Literature at the University of Chicago. He is a scholar of American and African American literature from the late 19th century to the middle 20th century. In 2005, he received the Quantrell Award.

== Publications ==
=== Books ===
- Black Studies, Cultural Politics, and the Evasion of Inequality: The Farce this Time (w/Adolph Reed Jr.). Routledge (2025), ISBN 978-1-003-56994-7
- What Was African American Literature? (Harvard, 2010)
- So Black and Blue: Ralph Ellison and the Occasion of Criticism (Chicago, 2003)
- Black and White Strangers: Race and American Literary Realism (Chicago, 1993)

=== Editor ===
- Renewing Black Intellectual History: The Material and Ideological Foundations of African America Thought (w/Adolph Reed Jr.) Routledge (2010)
- Jim Crow, Literature, and the Legacy of Sutton E. Griggs (Georgia, 2013)

== Selected articles ==
- "To Make a Literature Black," Early American Literature, vol 50 no. 3, 2015
- "A Reply to my Critics," PMLA, vol 128 no. 2, March 2013
- "On What was African-American Literature?" Amerikastudien / America Studies, vol 55 no. 4, 2010
- "'As white as anybody': Race and the Politics of Counting as Black," New Literary History, vol 31 no. 4, Autumn 2000
- "An Inevitable Drift?: Oligarchy, Du Bois and the Politics of Race Between the Wars," boundary 2, vol 27 no. 3, Fall 2000
- "The End(s) of African-American Studies," American Literary History, vol 12 no. 3, Autumn 2000
- "Appeals for (Mis)recognition: Theorizing the Diaspora," in Cultures of United States Imperialism, eds. Amy Kaplan and Donald E. Pease (Duke University Press, 1994)
- "Thinking Beyond Catastrophe: Leon Forrest's There is a Tree More Ancient Than Eden," Callaloo, vol 16 no. 2, Spring 1993
