= Sianne Ngai =

American cultural theorist

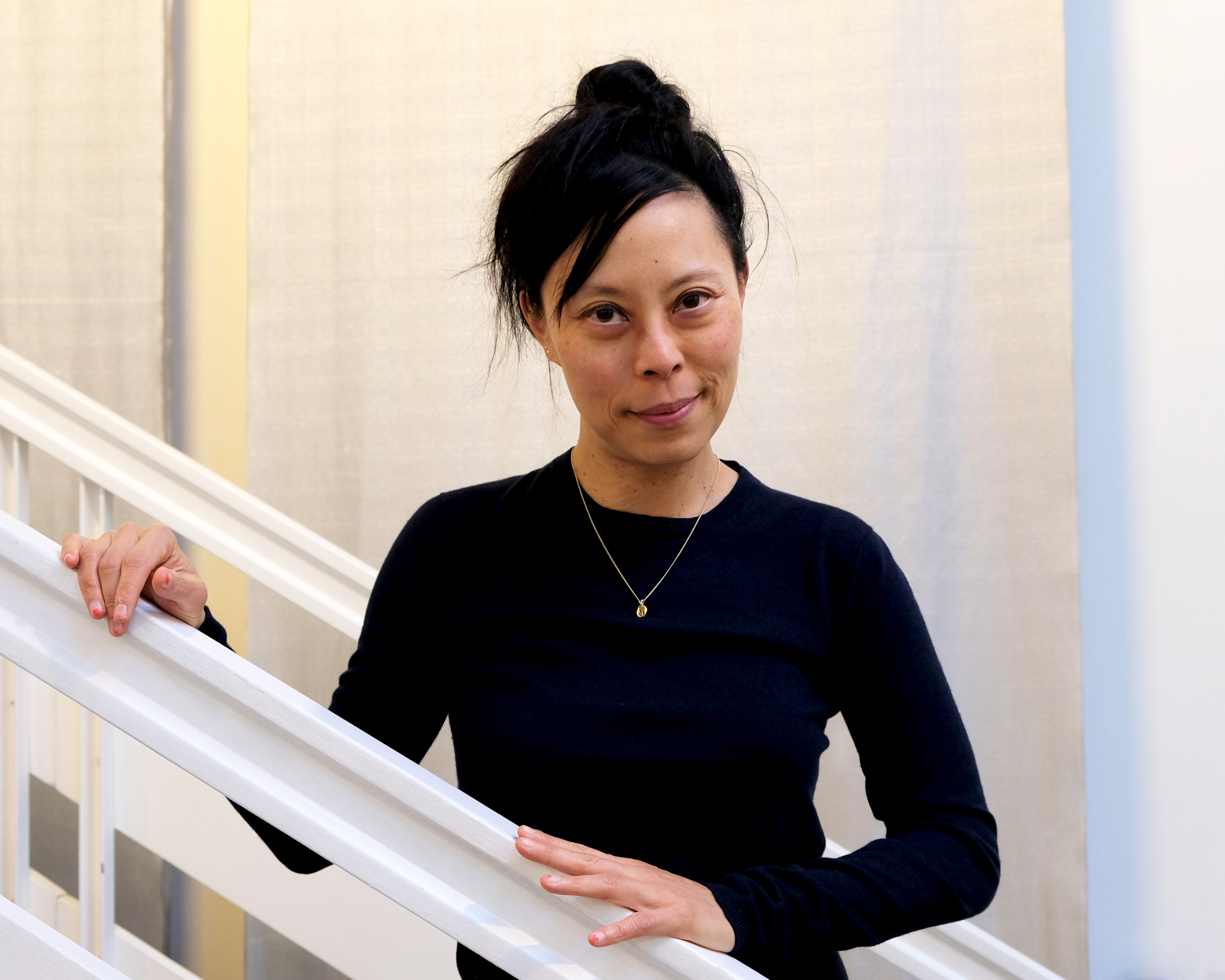
Sianne Ngai (2024)

Sianne Ngai is an American cultural theorist, literary critic, and feminist scholar who serves as the George M. Pullman Distinguished Service Professor in the Department of English Language and Literature at the University of Chicago.

Ngai is the author of Ugly Feelings (2005), Our Aesthetic Categories: Zany, Cute, Interesting (2012), and Theory of the Gimmick: Aesthetic Judgment and Capitalist Form (2020), all published by Harvard University Press. Sections of her books have been translated into Swedish, Italian, German, Slovenian, Portuguese, Japanese, and Korean. She has been described as "the most influential literary theorist of her generation" by The Chronicle of Higher Education, and "a star literary theorist" by Bookforum.

== Career ==
After graduating from Thomas Jefferson High School for Science and Technology in 1989, Ngai received her B.A. in 1993 and M.F.A. in 1995 from Brown University, followed by a Ph.D. from Harvard University in 2000. Her dissertation advisors were literary critics Lawrence Buell and Barbara Johnson, with philosopher Stanley Cavell also serving on her committee. Ngai taught at Stanford University from 2000 to 2007 before serving as an associate professor at UCLA from 2007 to 2011. She returned to Stanford as a professor in 2011, where she remained until 2017.

== Critical theory ==
Ngai studies the emotional gaps, contradictions, and negativities in literature, film, and theoretical writing in order to explore situations of suspended agency. Her work also examines the aesthetic judgements people make under capitalism.

== Publications ==
=== Ugly Feelings (2005) ===
In Ugly Feelings, Ngai constructs a theoretical framework for analyzing and mobilizing affective concepts and presents a series of studies in the aesthetics of negative emotions, examining their politically ambiguous work in a range of cultural artifacts produced in what Theodor W. Adorno and Max Horkheimer refer to in Dialectic of Enlightenment as the "fully administered world of late modernity."

In contrast to powerful and dynamic negative emotions like anger, non-cathartic states of feeling like envy, irritation, and paranoia are associated with situations in which action is blocked or suspended. In her examination of the cultural forms to which these affects give rise, Ngai suggests that these minor and more politically ambiguous feelings become more suited for diagnosing the character of late modernity.

=== Our Aesthetic Categories (2012) ===
Our Aesthetic Categories examines the "zany," the "cute," and the "interesting." Ngai argues that while these categories are often marginalized in traditional aesthetic theory, they best illustrate how aesthetic experience has been transformed by the hyper-commodified, information-saturated, performance-driven conditions of late capitalism.

Using the example of a frog-shaped baby's bath toy, Ngai illustrates that cuteness is an aestheticization of powerlessness, as the purpose of the cute bath toy is for it to be pressed against a baby's body, and squished in a way guaranteed to repeatedly crush and deform its formless face. The nonaesthetic properties associated with cuteness (smallness, compactness, formal simplicity, softness or pliancy) thus also index minor negative affects such as helplessness, pitifulness, and despondency. Ngai also argues that the term "cute" is a way of sexualizing beings while simultaneously rendering them unthreatening. She illustrates this by providing several examples of poems that deploy cuteness as a means of rendering the overtly aggressive and sexual dimension of the theme unthreatening.

=== Theory of the Gimmick (2020) ===
In Theory of the Gimmick, Ngai characterizes the "gimmick" as both an aesthetic category and an aesthetic judgement. Defining it as a gadget that flatters to deceive, she explores how the gimmick encodes a relation to labor, acting as the inverted image of the modernist "device" celebrated by Victor Shklovsky.

Extending the focus in Ngai's second book on the historical significance of the rise of equivocal aesthetic categories, Theory of the Gimmick explores the mix of attraction and repulsion produced by the gimmick across a range of forms specific to capitalist society. These include fiction by Mark Twain, Joris-Karl Huysmans, Villiers de L'Isle-Adam, and Henry James; twentieth-century poetic stunts; the video installations of contemporary artist Stan Douglas; and philosophical fiction.

One reviewer noted that the book demonstrates that American cultural theory is capable of structural thinking and Marxist critique, while also firmly grounded in a cultural theory tradition. Another reviewer said that it feels more like a collection of essays than a cohesive argument.

== Selected articles ==
- "Stuplimity: Shock and Boredom in Twentieth-Century Aesthetics," Postmodern Culture, vol. 10 no. 2, January 2000
- "Bad Timing (A Sequel), Paranoia, Feminism, and Poetry," differences, vol. 12 no. 2, September 2001
- "Jealous Schoolgirls, Single White Females, and Other Bad Examples: Rethinking Gender and Envy," Camera Obscura, vol. 16 no. 2, September 2001
- "Competitiveness: from ‘Sula to Tyra,'" Women's Studies Quarterly, vol. 34 no. 3/4, Winter 2006

== Awards ==
Ngai was the recipient of a 2007 Charles A. Rysamp Research Fellowship from the American Council of Learned Societies. She was a fellow at the Berlin Institute for Advanced Study in 2014–15. She was awarded an honorary doctorate in philosophy from the University of Copenhagen in 2015, and won a Guggenheim Fellowship in 2024. Her book Our Aesthetic Categories: Zany, Cute, Interesting was the winner of the James Russell Lowell Prize (2012).
