= Curiouser and Curiouser! (Ted Lasso) =

- Ted Lasso episode
- Episode no.: Season 4 Episode 2
- Directed by: MJ Delaney
- Written by: Leann Bowen
- Cinematography by: Vanessa Whyte
- Editing by: A.J. Catoline
- Original release date: August 12, 2026
- Running time: 47 minutes

Guest appearances
- Mercedes Assad as Margy El Sharif; Annelise Heywood as Mandy Song; Annette Badland as Mae Green; Harriet Walter as Deborah; Adam Colborne as Basil "Baz" Primrose; Kevin Garry as Paul La Fleur; Bronson Webb as Jeremy Blumenthal

Episode chronology
| ← Previous "Home" | Next → "Richmond's Got Talent" |

"Curiouser and Curiouser!" is the second episode of the fourth season of the American sports comedy-drama television series Ted Lasso, based on the character played by Jason Sudeikis in a series of promos for NBC Sports' coverage of England's Premier League. It is the 36th overall episode of the series and was written by executive producer Leann Bowen and directed by MJ Delaney. It was released on Apple TV on August 12, 2026.

The series follows Ted Lasso, an American college football coach who is unexpectedly recruited to coach a fictional English Premier League soccer team, AFC Richmond, despite having no experience coaching soccer. After helping the team reach second place in the Premier League, Ted returns home to be with his young son. In the episode, Ted starts his new position at the women's team in Richmond, where he finds himself at odds with assistant manager Alice Chilton.

The episode received positive reviews from critics, who praised the return to Richmond and also highlighted Reynolds' performance as Alice.

== Plot ==
Back in London, Ted begins his new job as the coach of the A.F.C. Richmond women's football team, catching up with Roy. He is informed that his assistant coach, Alice Chilton, is planning to resign after Rebecca passed her over for the head coach position. He gets to meet the female team, finding that their locker room is very small and they lack many resources. During a press conference, he is bombarded with questions related to the men's team instead.

Ted begins training sessions while getting to know the team, which includes striker Josie and Gemma, twin defenders Niamh and Siobhan, and goalkeeper "Boots". Boots is a skilled goalkeeper, but no football club is willing to make offers for her as she refuses to wear gloves. Ted's personality contrasts with Alice's abrasive personality, and she finds herself annoyed by his traits. Ted also meets up with Beard, who is unable to help him in his coaching duties due to his contract with the men's team.

Keeley fights to find appropriate facilities for the women's team. After Rebecca does not approve the budget needed to build a new locker room, she convinces her to let her use the visitor's locker room instead of sharing the academy's locker room. Roy volunteers to help fix it up by removing the sabotage he previously installed. Rebecca is also bothered when Alice suggests she does not support women, and tries to prove herself as a feminist.

Seeing Beard deeply misses Ted, Roy decides to release him from his contract, using an obscure clause. During training, Josie suffers a severe injury and Alice accompanies her to the hospital, where the injury is revealed to have her benched for the rest of the season. On Alice's final day, Ted reveals the new locker room for the team, and also privately tells Alice he researched her; she suffered a similar injury that ended her playing career and steered her toward coaching. Ted recognizes what she can bring to the team and asks her to stay on. She agrees, and Beard also arrives to join Ted's staff. Privately, Rebecca and Higgins discuss the long-term viability of the women's team, which is not just looking bleak, but it could also derail investment in the men's team as well.

== Development ==
=== Production ===
The episode was written by executive producer Leann Bowen and directed by MJ Delaney. This marked Bowen's fourth writing credit, and Delaney's seventh directing credit.

=== Writing ===
Tanya Reynolds explained Alice's clashes with Rebecca, "I think that Alice is actually quite intimidated by Rebecca, and so that kind of just makes Alice get her back up even more. I think they're both just kind of intimidated by each other. And they're just very different people. Actually, I don't think they are that different, but they think they're very different people, and so they just clash." Regarding her new job with Ted, she added, "She can tell that Ted sees something in her that maybe she doesn't even quite see in herself. I think she's quite stuck and locked as a person when we meet her, and she's aware of it as well. She's her own worst enemy, and so she can't break out, and I think that there is something about Ted that presents itself as a kind of life raft."

== Critical response ==
"Curiouser and Curiouser!" received positive reviews from critics. The review aggregator website Rotten Tomatoes reported a 100% approval rating for the episode, based on 7 reviews, with an average rating of 7.7/10.

Saloni Gajjar of The A.V. Club gave the episode a "B" and wrote, "It's only the second episode, so I'm giving Ted Lasso a pass for not giving more time to the players, but the remaining episodes of season four had better focus on their internal dynamic so we can get to know them just as well as we did the AFC Richmond dudes."

Keith Phipps of Vulture gave the episode a 4 star rating out of 5 and wrote, "It's possible, if unlikely, that this fourth season might have followed Ted around as he worked in the grocery, attended his son's soccer games, helped his mom move, etc. But a series' identity goes beyond its name, and with “Curiouser and Curiouser!” the season returns to familiar Ted Lasso territory after the previous episode's prologue/catch-up session/Kansas City travel guide." Hannah Abraham of Forbes wrote, "For all the frustration I had with this episode, I still teared up seeing their joy and gratitude for something that, bar for bar, the men's team takes for granted (except maybe the unlimited tampons). What a relief to finally feel an organic emotion without it being dictated to me."

Evan Davis of Decider wrote, "Ted Lasso has never cared much for the realities of life as a football player or coach in England. This season presents a potentially insurmountable obstacle to that storytelling approach. If the show wants the audience to take the actual struggles of women's footballers seriously, then the moments when they pivot to “BELIEVE” vibes serve to cheapen those real-life struggles. We have eight more weeks to discover where Sudeikis, Burditt and the rest of the creative team land." Maggie Herriman of TV Fanatic gave the episode a 4 star rating out of 5 and wrote, "Ted Lasso Season 4 Episode 2 is finally starting to dive into everyone's efforts to get AFC Richmond's Lady Greyhounds off the ground. I'm intrigued to see how they explore the logistical and emotional challenges the characters will overcome in the process."

Christopher Orr of The New York Times wrote, "Alice, Ted's cranky new assistant coach, is the primary addition to this season's cast, and she already fits a very familiar model: the skeptical naysayer whom Ted needs to win over with his bottomless decency and goofy wisdom. Alice is Rebecca. And Roy. And Jamie. And Trent Crimm. And Dr. Fieldstone. And on and on. It’s too early to say much more, but I like Reynolds as an actress, and I’m looking forward to seeing how the character develops." Lara Rosales of Telltale TV gave the episode a 4.6 rating out of 5 and wrote, "It is those details that made Ted Lasso so lovable. And, let's be honest, if the season continues to focus on the details and the stories they know the fans love, we will be okay."
