= Riches of Embarrassment =

- Ted Lasso episode
- Episode no.: Season 4 Episode 5
- Directed by: Ellie Heydon
- Written by: Phoebe Walsh
- Cinematography by: David Rom
- Editing by: Francesca Castro
- Original release date: September 2, 2026
- Running time: 48 minutes

Guest appearances
- Matteo van der Grijn as Matthijs; Tracey Ullman as Zelda Southport; Mercedes Assad as Margy El Sharif; Annelise Heywood as Mady Song; Shannon Hayes as Shannon; Katy Wix as Barbara; Adam Colborne as Basil "Baz" Primrose; Kevin Garry as Paul La Fleur; Bronson Webb as Jeremy Blumenthal; Phoebe Walsh as Jane; Charlotte Riley as stage manager

Episode chronology
← Previous "Greyhounds' Day Off"	Next → "Don't Jump Around Much Anymore"

"Riches of Embarrassment" is the fifth episode of the fourth season of the American sports comedy-drama television series Ted Lasso, based on the character played by Jason Sudeikis in a series of promos for NBC Sports' coverage of England's Premier League. It is the 39th overall episode of the series and was written by co-executive producer Phoebe Walsh and directed by Ellie Heydon. It was released on Apple TV on September 2, 2026.

The series follows Ted Lasso, an American college football coach who is unexpectedly recruited to coach a fictional English Premier League soccer team, A.F.C. Richmond, despite having no experience coaching soccer. After helping the team reach second place in the Premier League, Ted returns home to be with his young son. In the episode, Richmond faces Chelsea at home, but Ted and Beard realize Alice's methods differ with their own.

The episode received mixed reviews from critics, with critics polarized over the handling of the different storylines.

== Plot ==
Mady and Margy spot Ted eating alone in a restaurant. They take a picture and circulate it throughout the team, leading them to question his personal life, but Ted maintains he is fine. During training before their match against Chelsea F.C., Alice speaks to the team in a harsh and hostile manner.

Matthijs tells Rebecca that he got a job at Virgin Atlantic and is moving to London. While Rebecca is delighted, she is less enthused with the idea of Matthijs and his daughter Jelka moving in with her. When she questions Jelka about this, Matthijs is defensive and decides to take a break from their relationship. Keeley and Roy discuss the latter's progress over his ten dates, and Roy reveals that several of them have been with the same person. Beard and Ted watch Jane's one-woman play, only to discover it is an attempt for Jane to apologize for her selfishness; Beard and Jane reconcile and resume their relationship. Backstage, Ted runs into the show's stage manager, and they briefly bond.

During the match against Chelsea, support and attendance is lower than anticipated, leading Keeley to wonder if her efforts in raising awareness are for nothing. By the first half, Richmond is losing 0-2, and Alice continues her aggressive treatment towards the players. At the locker room, Ted motivates the team, explaining he does not see himself as lonely and that he believes in them. Rebecca uses the live broadcast to encourage more people to support the team and to come to the stadium. In the second half, Gemma and Margy score two additional goals to tie the game. However, at the last minute, Niamh accidentally scores an own goal while trying to defend the area, so Richmond loses the game. While Keeley believes she failed in attracting people, Boots lifts her up, stating that they had their biggest audience yet.

At their office, Ted speaks with Alice over her treatment of the team and reveals he will suspend her for one match. Realizing she will miss the last match of the year before Christmas break, Alice angrily leaves. At home, Rebecca and Keeley hang out, until Keeley breaks down, expressing jealousy of Roy's new relationship.

== Development ==
=== Production ===
The episode was written by co-executive producer Phoebe Walsh and directed by Ellie Heydon. This marked Walsh's fourth writing credit, and Heydon's second directing credit.

=== Writing ===
Tanya Reynolds explained Alice's behavior in the episode, "if you're playing a character, you're not thinking, 'Oh, I'm being a dick, I'm being a villain'. It's about trying to understand — and trying to rationalize — for Alice why this is hurting her. Why she finds them losing literally offensive, and why she thinks that telling them that they're pathetic is gonna be helpful in any way, which she obviously does. You have to believe that Alice really thinks that she is right in doing this. If she thought that it was wrong, she wouldn't say it.”"

== Critical response ==
"Riches of Embarrassment" received mixed reviews from critics. The review aggregator website Rotten Tomatoes reported a 75% approval rating for the episode, based on 4 reviews.

Saloni Gajjar of The A.V. Club gave the episode a "C+" and wrote, "Season four goes back to testing our patience when it comes to everything outside of the Lady Greyhounds. It's worth repeating that the show isn't interested in spending proper time with the players, so we don't learn about their inner lives. Instead, we witness something far worse: the torture of Jane's one-woman play. Seriously, have we done something to Ted Lasso's creative team? Is this revenge for all the discourse that spilled out of season three?"

Keith Phipps of Vulture gave the episode a 4 star rating out of 5 and wrote, "As strong as this season has been and continues to be, a gap is starting to open up. At the moment, what's going on with the team is considerably more compelling than what's going on in the private lives of the show's characters."

Eric Francisco of Esquire wrote, "The fifth episode of season 4, “Riches of Embarrassment,” is old school quality Lasso I haven't seen in a long time. It's also a busy episode with plenty going on at once." Evan Davis of Decider wrote, "Sudeikis, Burditt, and the writers are so obsessed with putting Alice into a Nate-shaped hole, out of which she can dig her way in the most heartfelt manner possible, that they tip the scales to make her more vicious than basically any real-life analogue would be. She's either a vulnerable sparrow or she’s a pitbull, nothing in between. Simply put, her arc has become storytelling without craft."

Christopher Orr of The New York Times wrote, "A quick word to say that I think Tanya Reynolds, who plays Alice, has been terrific all season, easily the best addition to the show. I had felt though, that her character occasionally seemed a bit like a variation on the later, angrier incarnations of Nick Mohammed's Nate from Seasons 1-3." Maggie Herriman of TV Fanatic gave the episode a 4.5 star rating out of 5 and wrote, "These plotlines finally converge, giving viewers clarity into the state of our characters' romantic hopes and fears. At the same time, they offer interesting commentary on overcoming shame and the boundaries between personal ambition and partnership."
