= Follow the Anger =

- Ted Lasso episode
- Episode no.: Season 4 Episode 8
- Directed by: Erica Dunton
- Written by: Jamie Lee; Brett Goldstein
- Cinematography by: David Rom
- Editing by: Melissa McCoy; Francesca Castro
- Original release date: September 23, 2026
- Running time: 51 minutes

Guest appearances
- Tracey Ullman as Zelda Southport; Annette Badland as Mae Green; Mercedes Assad as Margy El Sharif; Annelise Heywood as Mady Song; Shannon Hayes as Shannon; Laura Haddock as Dr. Erin Beaumont; Adam Colborne as Basil "Baz" Primrose; Kevin Garry as Paul La Fleur; Bronson Webb as Jeremy Blumenthal; Andrea Anders as Michelle Keller; Grant Feely as Henry Lasso

Episode chronology
← Previous "Yes & Baby"	Next → "Mae Rides the Bus"

"Follow the Anger" is the eighth episode of the fourth season of the American sports comedy-drama television series Ted Lasso, based on the character played by Jason Sudeikis in a series of promos for NBC Sports' coverage of England's Premier League. It is the 42nd overall episode of the series and was written by executive producers Jamie Lee and Brett Goldstein, and directed by Erica Dunton. It was released on Apple TV on September 23, 2026.

The series follows Ted Lasso, an American college football coach who is unexpectedly recruited to coach a fictional English Premier League soccer team, A.F.C. Richmond, despite having no experience coaching soccer. After helping the team reach second place in the Premier League, Ted returns home to be with his young son. In the episode, the team faces a big challenge when Gemma suffers an injury that could jeopardize their future, while Roy and Keeley visit Chelsea for an award ceremony for Roy.

The episode received positive reviews from critics, who considered the episode to be an improvement over the prior episodes, praising the performances, tone and pacing.

== Plot ==
The Lady Greyhounds starts winning several games, making them a candidate for promotion. However, while playing against Charlton Athletic W.F.C., Gemma injures her knees while the team wins. Her injury suggests she could miss the rest of the season, putting the team's future in danger. When Alice visits her, Gemma reveals she is accepting an internship at law school, upsetting Alice.

Roy is being inducted into the Chelsea Hall of Fame, and Keeley is accompanying him to the ceremony. He asks Ted for dating tips, and he is told to wait for the right moment. On their way, they face many problems, including accidentally parking Roy's car in a tight spot, forcing them to break the window to leave. They are forced to take the subway, with Roy confessing he is scared of them. It abruptly halts, and so they have to take a scooter from a stranger. While checking the team's financial prospects, Higgins discovers sudden sales of AFC Richmond shares and decides to investigate. After consulting with Mae, he reveals to Rebecca that Rupert is involved in the scheme.

Roy and Keeley finally make it to the ceremony, but the ceremony already ended. Inspired by Keeley, he delivers his planned speech to the empty venue. He uses it to finally confess his love for Keeley, and they share a kiss, rekindling their relationship. Ted finds Alice crying, and comforts her, affirming that crying can be good to express their feelings. Alice confronts Gemma at her home and urges her not to abandon football, as it is so central to her. She convinces the rest of the team, including Rebecca, to come and support Gemma at the hospital as she gets the MRI to determine the extent of the injury.

== Development ==
=== Production ===
The episode was written by executive producers Jamie Lee and Brett Goldstein, and directed by Erica Dunton. This marked Lee's fourth writing credit, Goldstein's fifth writing credit, and Dunton's sixth directing credit.

== Critical response ==
"Follow the Anger" received positive reviews from critics. Saloni Gajjar of The A.V. Club gave the episode a "B+" and wrote, "“Follow The Anger” is the type of Ted Lasso episode that makes you go, “Damn, if only the rest of the season was nearly as meaningful and fun to watch as this.” The eighth installment of season four largely encapsulates the series' strengths: a focus on character collaboration and team spirit, while finding the time for them to work on themselves in a high-pressure situation, as seen in how Alice and Ted handle the Lady Greyhounds' latest setback."

Keith Phipps of Vulture gave the episode a 4 star rating out of 5 and wrote, "We're in the home stretch of the show's season now — and the Greyhounds' season — and it's nice to see the focus remain on the team and those at the heart of it. That's partly because of the emphasis given to two of this season's most complicated relationships — the sometimes fraught, now strong bonds between Alice and Ted and Alice and Gemma. And while the Roy-Keeley subplot has been a belabored distraction, with the will-they-won't-they tension resolved, it might be possible to give those characters, and the charming actors who play them, less predictable things to do." Kevin Dolak of The Hollywood Reporter wrote, "This medium-stakes gambit — thankfully focused on the team — will drive the season into its final two episodes. Let's hope Ted shows up for them."

Eric Francisco of Esquire wrote, "“Follow the Anger,” the eighth episode of Ted Lasso season 4, serves up more of the old good feelings that made early Lasso a lockdown favorite. After a most rocky start to this season, I'm comfortable saying Lasso has not only found its groove but is close to resembling a good show again. At the very least, I don't feel secondhand embarrassment sitting through its episodes anymore. There are stakes and human failings that aren't quickly forgiven with a group hug. It's not a great show, but sometimes TV just needs to be TV." Evan Davis of Decider wrote, "I could never blame a player like Gemma if she honestly thought that there was something better waiting for her outside of football. According to Ted Lasso, all you need is to be awoken from the fog of uncertainty to regain your belief, and thus your success."

Christopher Orr of The New York Times wrote, "Well, that's more like it: a central story line involving Gemma and Alice; more attention to the Lady Greyhounds' success on the pitch than we'd seen so far; a nice moment with Ted and the team; a mysterious plot; and even a step forward for Keeley and Roy! There's a lot more going on than usual." Maggie Herriman of TV Fanatic gave the episode a 3.9 star rating out of 5 and wrote, "The mystery behind why things are that loaded between them has been compellingly teased by both actors. But with two episodes remaining, I fear we may not get enough insight to fully explain the strength of their push and pull."
