= Don't Jump Around Much Anymore =

- Ted Lasso episode
- Episode no.: Season 4 Episode 6
- Directed by: Declan Lowney
- Written by: Dylan Marron
- Cinematography by: Vanessa Whyte
- Editing by: Melissa McCoy
- Original release date: September 9, 2026
- Running time: 46 minutes

Guest appearances
- Phil Dunster as Jamie Tartt; Tracey Ullman as Zelda Southport; Andrea Anders as Michelle Keller; Mercedes Assad as Margy El Sharif; Annelise Heywood as Mady Song; Shannon Hayes as Shannon; Matteo van der Grijn as Matthijs; Annette Badland as Mae Green; Grant Feely as Henry Lasso; Adam Colborne as Basil "Baz" Primrose; Kevin Garry as Paul La Fleur; Bronson Webb as Jeremy Blumenthal; Laura Haddock as Dr. Erin Beaumont

Episode chronology
← Previous "Riches of Embarrassment"	Next → "Yes & Baby"

"Don't Jump Around Much Anymore" is the sixth episode of the fourth season of the American sports comedy-drama television series Ted Lasso, based on the character played by Jason Sudeikis in a series of promos for NBC Sports' coverage of England's Premier League. It is the 40th overall episode of the series and was written by Dylan Marron and directed by co-executive producer Declan Lowney. It was released on Apple TV on September 9, 2026.

The series follows Ted Lasso, an American college football coach who is unexpectedly recruited to coach a fictional English Premier League soccer team, A.F.C. Richmond, despite having no experience coaching soccer. After helping the team reach second place in the Premier League, Ted returns home to be with his young son. In the episode, the team celebrates New Year's Eve, with different conflicts at hand.

The episode received mixed reviews from critics, who criticized the storylines revolving around Rebecca, Keeley and Roy.

== Plot ==
On New Year's Eve, Ted spends time with Michelle and Henry at the Crown & Anchor. As Ted and Michelle talk, she questions his possible new romantic prospects, which he denies. Meanwhile, the Lady Greyhounds, along with Higgins and Beard, celebrate at Zelda's party, where they are soon joined by Alice, hoping to fix her image to the club.

Rebecca and Keeley attend a party event hosted by Jamie Tartt, and Roy joins soon after. After catching up, Roy and Jamie dance to "Jump Around" on the dancefloor, but Roy accidentally falls and injures his knee. At the hospital, Erin arrives to check on him, and Keeley is surprised to finally meet her. Seeing him flirt with Erin under the influence of painkillers, Keeley leaves heartbroken. However, Roy mistakes Erin for Keeley and professes his love for the latter. Rebecca confides in Jamie her problems with Matthijs, but Jamie motivates her in trying to make amends.

At Ted's apartment, Michelle once again brings up his love life. Ted claims he is not pursuing anyone, and brings up her romance with Dr. Jacob. Michelle states that Jacob did not pursue her; she was heartbroken after their divorce and she personally asked him out, despite his reservations on the ethical grounds. Ted comforts her, Michelle encourages him to ask a woman out on a date, and they end on friendly terms. At the party, Alice has a vulnerable conversation with Gemma, putting aside their conflicts.

As the New Year arrives, Rebecca reunites and reconciles with Matthijs. Ted arrives to celebrate with the Lady Greyhounds and hugs Alice, looking forward to seeing her back at the field. However, a drunk Lizzie implies that Gemma told the team about her conversation with Alice, and Alice leaves angrily. Ted returns home and finds a new "Believe" banner crafted by Michelle.

== Development ==
=== Production ===
The episode was written by Dylan Marron and directed by co-executive producer Declan Lowney. This marked Marron's second writing credit, and Lowney's tenth directing credit.

=== Writing ===
The episode features the return of Phil Dunster as Jamie Tartt, in a guest appearance. According to Lowney, the original pitch involved the team visiting Barcelona, as Jamie is now playing for FC Barcelona, but due to logistic issues, the idea was changed to Jamie visiting London. Brendan Hunt felt that the writers had to wait some time before re-introducing Jamie into the series, "To a degree, people are going to be jonesing for what we were doing before, which is totally understandable, and you've got to go cold turkey a little bit. If we give people a little bit of this character or that character, then they might too easily start looking at that."

== Critical response ==
"Don't Jump Around Much Anymore" received mixed reviews from critics. Saloni Gajjar of The A.V. Club gave the episode a "C+" and wrote, "“Don't Jump Around Much Anymore” continues to firmly drag out the will-they/won't-they between Roy and Keeley for no one's benefit, certainly not the show's. I'm sick and tired of it, actually. Usually, Ted Lasso reserves important conversations for off-screen, which is what made season three's pacing wonky and frustrating. But now, we're forced to endure two seemingly wise characters acting with profound stupidity."

Keith Phipps of Vulture gave the episode a 3 star rating out of 5 and wrote, "Despite some strong comic highlights, “Don’t Jump Around Much Anymore” is uneven in many of the same ways as the previous episode, “The Riches of Embarrassment.” In short, all the plot strands involving the team and their complex relationship with the coaching staff feel more compelling than what's going on with Rebecca and Keeley, characters who are increasingly defined by their relationships with the men in their lives. Keeley eavesdropping, then missing Roy's verbal gaffe feels only slightly less contrived than the last-minute arrival of Matthjis, whose relationship with Rebecca seems to turn hot and cold when the show needs some added drama." Keith Phipps of The Hollywood Reporter wrote, "So we have a series that sets out to confront the inequity between men's and women's sports and falls directly into the same trap — leaving its women underdeveloped and lacking support. It's a shame but the series still has time to fix it — but it had better come fast: Season four is fading, and it won't be a memorable return for Mr. Lasso if it doesn't turn things around soon."

Eric Francisco of Esquire wrote, "It's not even the end of summer yet. But Ted Lasso rings in the new year anyway with its latest episode. But unlike the atrocious Christmas special from season 2, “Don't Jump Around Much Anymore” has some sincere moments of grace and gravity, with several major storylines taking big leaps forward — while others follow more drawn-out scenic routes." Evan Davis of Decider wrote, "It sucks that Sudeikis and Burditt aren't good enough to apply the necessary shading to Rebecca's and Matthijs's relationship problems, so what we get is a shitty boyfriend the show thinks is a knight in Dutch armor."

Christopher Orr of The New York Times wrote, "Moving on from my dazzling feats of romantic prognostication, this week's offering was not exactly a bottle episode, but it had the feel of one — and mostly not, for my taste, in a good way." Maggie Herriman of TV Fanatic gave the episode a 4 star rating out of 5.

=== Accolades ===
TVLine named Brett Goldstein as a honorable mention for the "Performer of the Week" for the week of September 12, 2026, for his performance in the episode. The site wrote, "As Roy Kent, Brett Goldstein typically gets to express one emotion: gruff annoyance. But this week, as Ted Lasso & Co. rang in the new year, we got to see two very different sides of the former Greyhound: chemically assisted and all-natural elation. The grin that washed over his face when he first laid eyes on Jamie Tartt making "an absolute tit of himself" at his vodka launch party was already something special. Then House of Pain's "Jump Around" took hold, giving us the best 30 seconds of Ted Lasso Season 4 as Roy gave in to the moment and joined Jamie on the dance floor, culminating in the shattering of his bum knee and a mad dash to a literal house of pain — the hospital. There, Kent was administered "the good stuff," resulting in a version of Roy we've never seen before: completely uninhibited. At this point, it wasn't so much what was written on the page as Goldstein's delivery — playing with his oxygen tubing like a child with G.I. Joe dolls, greeting his girlfriend with an exaggerated "Hello, doctor!" then following that up with a "Wasssup!" to Jamie. And somehow, it was all rather... charming? Which speaks to Goldstein's sharp comic instincts."
