= Richmond's Got Talent =

- Ted Lasso episode
- Episode no.: Season 4 Episode 3
- Directed by: MJ Delaney
- Written by: Sasha Garron
- Cinematography by: Vanessa Whyte
- Editing by: Melissa McCoy
- Original release date: August 19, 2026
- Running time: 46 minutes

Guest appearances
- Mercedes Assad as Margy El Sharif; Annelise Heywood as Mandy Song; Shannon Hayes as Shannon; Andrea Anders as Michelle Keller; Grant Feely as Henry Lasso; Annette Badland as Mae Green; Matteo van der Grijn as Matthijs; Katy Wix as Barbara; Adam Colborne as Basil "Baz" Primrose; Kevin Garry as Paul La Fleur; Bronson Webb as Jeremy Blumenthal

Episode chronology
← Previous "Curiouser and Curiouser!"	Next → "Greyhounds' Day Off"

"Richmond's Got Talent" is the third episode of the fourth season of the American sports comedy-drama television series Ted Lasso, based on the character played by Jason Sudeikis in a series of promos for NBC Sports' coverage of England's Premier League. It is the 37th overall episode of the series and was written by co-producer Sasha Garron and directed by MJ Delaney. It was released on Apple TV on August 19, 2026.

The series follows Ted Lasso, an American college football coach who is unexpectedly recruited to coach a fictional English Premier League soccer team, A.F.C. Richmond, despite having no experience coaching soccer. After helping the team reach second place in the Premier League, Ted returns home to be with his young son. In the episode, Ted, Alice and Beard start open trials to find new strikers, while Keeley and Rebecca try to save the team's bad reputation.

The episode received positive reviews from critics, who praised the sequences at AFC Richmond, but some were critical of the episode's subplots.

== Plot ==
Lady Greyhounds lose their remaining striker due to pregnancy leave. With their first game coming up, the staff conducts open trials to find new strikers. During this, Henry begins his school sessions in London, befriending Phoebe in the process.

During a Richmond shareholders' meeting, the news surrounding the women's team is met with disinterest. Furthermore, Higgins' report detailing the bleak financial prospects of the club are published, upsetting many that they are not investing in getting Richmond to the UEFA Champions League. Keeley is disheartened at not being informed of this, but sets out to save the team from the report. Rebecca is also forced to recoup a sponsor that pulled out of the women's team, but discovers this is affecting her relationship with Matthijs.

The tryouts prove to be harder than expected, with nearly everyone being disqualified early. Beard believes Dani Rojas' sister, Maria, has the same skills as her brother, but they are forced to disqualify her after it is clear she does not know soccer. By the end of the day, only two women, Lizzie Davis and Shannon, remain but neither are strong enough to be strikers. Without any options, they recruit both of them, with Ted admiring Shannon's energy. Alice and Ted go to speak with her old teammate Gemma, who reveals that she left football because of how hard Alice was on her when they were teammates. But when Ted reveals that Gemma was the only name Alice suggested, Gemma reconsiders and decides to play for the team while remaining in law school.

Keeley struggles in keeping the women's team afloat, to the point that she is unable to get the uniforms. Roy then gets Phoebe to help her in making the uniforms with her friends, finishing them just in time for the first game. The game almost ends with no plays, but Alice gets Gemma to enter the game, and she scores the winning goal. Roy visits Keeley, giving her a new report to convince her not to give up on her plans. After failing to show up multiple times, Rebecca finally meets with Matthijs for a date.

== Development ==
=== Production ===
The episode was written by co-producer Sasha Garron and directed by MJ Delaney. This marked Garron's third writing credit, and Delaney's eighth directing credit.

=== Writing ===
Abbie Hern said that Gemma's motivation to join Richmond is due to her passion for football, despite her troubled past with Alice. She explained, "Of course, she wants to be a professional women's football player, and she wants that to be her career and her life. But actually, that comes with a lot of compromise. Juggling the two worlds will prove physically taxing and emotionally taxing and academically taxing."

=== Casting ===
The episode introduces the character of Maria Rojas, sister of Dani Rojas. In real life, actress Paloma Cinco is the sister of Cristo Fernández, who plays Dani. Both stars pitched the idea, with many ideas floating around, including having the character named "Daniela Rojas" and having the character be as talented as Dani. Cinco added, "I like the idea that Maria left the tryouts and was inspired to learn how to play soccer, as well as the idea that it's never too late to learn something new. I like that Maria has learned so many great things from her brother. Who better to teach her how to kick the ball around, right?"

== Critical response ==
"Richmond's Got Talent" received positive reviews from critics. The review aggregator website Rotten Tomatoes reported a 100% approval rating for the episode, based on 6 reviews, with an average rating of 7.8/10.

Saloni Gajjar of The A.V. Club gave the episode a "B" and wrote, "Preachy as it may be, Ted Lasso at least hammers on the right points in “Richmond's Got Talent,” as when Roy's niece Phoebe's pointedly reminds us “Both teams are Richmond.” After a disastrous start to the season and a surprisingly solid second outing, it's a relief that episode three lands with its heart in the right place."

Keith Phipps of Vulture gave the episode a 4 star rating out of 5 and wrote, "The team is playing to a smaller crowd and its matches are being streamed, not broadcast. There's a long, tough road ahead, even after these triumphs." Eric Francisco of Esquire wrote, "The Apple TV hit has spent its fourth season thus far relishing its worst habits from seasons 2 and 3 to the point that I'm convinced the show's writers are intentionally trying to craft a parody of their own work. “Richmond's Got Talent,” the third episode of season 4, isn't making a compelling argument to the contrary."

Evan Davis of Decider wrote, "Ted Lasso isn't showing toxic men to precisely reflect reality, but rather to set up its typical stakes. The underdog must be firmly established so that they may overcome impossible odds by season's end. It's how the men's team somehow nearly won the Premier League title by the end of season 3, one year after getting promoted back to the division. The open tryouts the coaches hold are another way to show that the Lady Greyhounds are the little engine that could." Maggie Herriman of TV Fanatic gave the episode a 4.1 star rating out of 5 and wrote, "The season is just heating up and starting to hit its stride — and I can't wait to see what's next for our growing women's team."

Christopher Orr of The New York Times wrote, "And with full awareness that I am a broken record on the subject, please, enough of Roy orbiting Keeley mopily and making nervous gestures of affection. Of all the paths this story line can take, the current unhappy stasis may be the least fun of all." Lara Rosales of Telltale TV gave the episode a 4.5 rating out of 5 and wrote, "Ted Lasso Season 4 has started on a high note, but there is one thing that feels a bit off. While it's exciting to see Rebecca find a relationship the way she wanted to, this particular relationship does not feel good or thrilling."
