= Greyhounds' Day Off =

- Ted Lasso episode
- Episode no.: Season 4 Episode 4
- Directed by: Ellie Heydon
- Written by: Sarah Walker
- Cinematography by: David Rom
- Editing by: A.J. Catoline
- Original release date: August 26, 2026
- Running time: 44 minutes

Guest appearances
- Sarah Niles as Dr. Sharon Fieldstone; James Lance as Trent Crimm; Annette Badland as Mae Green; Tracey Ullman as Zelda Southport; Mercedes Assad as Margy El Sharif; Annelise Heywood as Mandy Song; Shannon Hayes as Shannon; Adam Colborne as Basil "Baz" Primrose; Kevin Garry as Paul La Fleur; Bronson Webb as Jeremy Blumenthal; Laura Haddock as Dr. Erin Beaumont

Episode chronology
← Previous "Richmond's Got Talent"	Next → "Riches of Embarrassment"

"Greyhounds' Day Off" is the fourth episode of the fourth season of the American sports comedy-drama television series Ted Lasso, based on the character played by Jason Sudeikis in a series of promos for NBC Sports' coverage of England's Premier League. It is the 38th overall episode of the series and was written by co-executive producer Sarah Walker and directed by Ellie Heydon. It was released on Apple TV on August 26, 2026.

The series follows Ted Lasso, an American college football coach who is unexpectedly recruited to coach a fictional English Premier League soccer team, A.F.C. Richmond, despite having no experience coaching soccer. After helping the team reach second place in the Premier League, Ted returns home to be with his young son. In the episode, Ted, Beard and Alice try to build a bond between the team, while Roy finally makes clear his intentions with Keeley.

The episode received positive reviews from critics, who praised the chemistry between the team and Tracey Ullman's guest appearance, although some were critical of Keeley's and Roy's subplot.

== Plot ==
Trent Crimm invites Dr. Sharon to his podcast, Through the Laces, to discuss her book. The book's content is supported by the events of the episode.

Ted, Beard and Alice are aware of problems within the team, requiring them to disband cliques in the locker room. Ted and Beard realize they need either a common goal or a common enemy to unite them. When a squabble breaks out in the locker room, Ted decides to cancel training and enlist all the girls in the newly reinstated quiz night at the Crown & Anchor, with Ted choosing their teams. While it seems that they finally bonded, the team gets into another brawl when Gemma is accused of cheating, landing the team in jail.

Keeley encourages Rebecca to meet with Zelda Southport, a woman who has made a name for herself financing women's football clubs. Keeley is enthralled by Zelda but Rebecca is hesitant, as she believes Zelda will not be a great investment. While discussing this with Roy, Keeley realizes he wants to get back together with her. She states that she is unable to see him commit himself to a relationship given he has not dated a single woman since they broke up, so Roy sets out to date 10 different women to be sure that Roy genuinely wants her. Roy tries to speedrun the dates and ends up hooking up with a bartender until he injures his knee again. At the hospital, Jenni takes him to a friend specialist, Dr. Erin Beaumont, and they end up bonding.

Zelda gets the whole team released using her connections, arranging for their charges to be dropped. Higgins arrives, confirming that their next match at Women's FA Cup will be Chelsea F.C. at home, exciting the team. Keeley takes a picture of the team and Zelda quietly encourages her that it is a prime marketing opportunity. As consequence of their actions, Ted forces the team to run to the pub and clean it up.

== Development ==
=== Production ===
The episode was written by co-executive producer Sarah Walker and directed by Ellie Heydon. This marked Walker's first writing credit, and Heydon's first directing credit.

=== Writing ===
For the quiz night scenes, Abbie Hern explained "it foreshadows all of our parts of the team and the parts that we play within the team. When we’re faced with that immediate adversity, Gemma will be like ‘Absolutely not. You're saying we can't do something, you watch us do it.’" Jude Mack further added, "[Boots is] an agent of chaos. I think it's that turning point for the team of becoming a team. In a classic Ted Lasso style, that being done in such a silly, fun way of it being a bottling in a pub is perfect. I think, for the character, it's the moment where she uses that aggression for loyalty and to stand up for the gals, which is very fun."

=== Casting ===
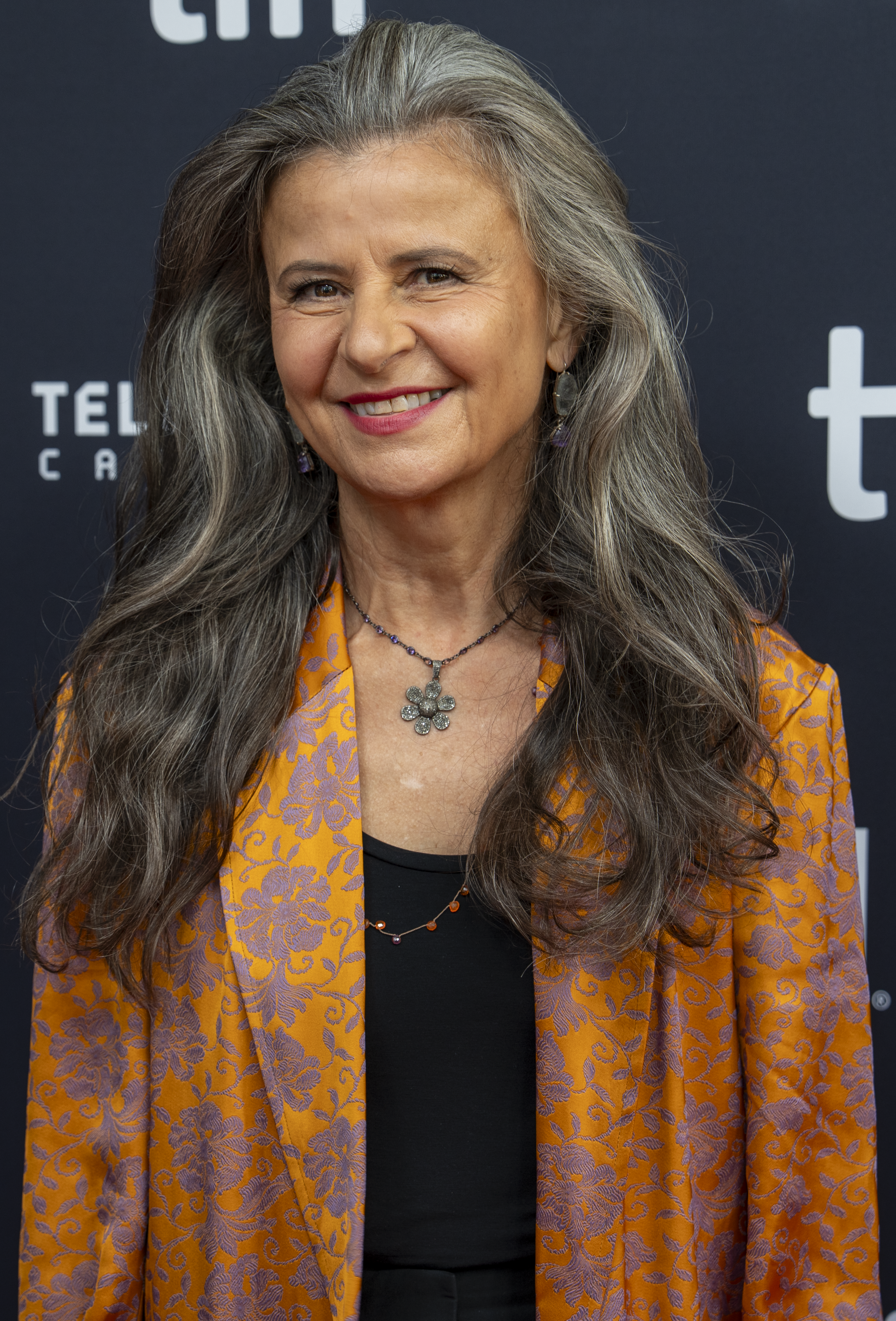
Tracey Ullman guest stars in the episode as Zelda Southport.

The episode features a guest appearance of Tracey Ullman, playing entrepreneur Zelda Southport. Brendan Hunt said that the plan was to feature "this character, someone else in the business, someone in the women's sports business realm for Rebecca and Keeley to rub shoulders with and eventually go into cahoots with and try to learn from." Originally, the crew planned for the character to be younger, but they felt that the character had to be "in more of a position of mentorship for Rebecca." When they established the character, Ullman was their first and only choice for the role.

== Critical response ==
"Greyhounds' Day Off" received positive reviews from critics. The review aggregator website Rotten Tomatoes reported a 83% approval rating for the episode, based on 6 reviews, with an average rating of 7.4/10.

Saloni Gajjar of The A.V. Club gave the episode a "B" and wrote, "“Greyhounds’ Day Off” is, ultimately, what we would back in the day call a filler episode. I don't mean this as a complaint, or in a bad way at all. TV shows need such outings to fill in the blanks and patiently help us understand characters better, regardless of the plot's momentum. The episode doesn't exactly ace this, but it's comforting to know that Ted Lasso still has the ability to make an overlong but fun and somewhat compelling episode — even if it comes at the cost of Beard losing his mind over Jane once again."

Keith Phipps of Vulture gave the episode a 4 star rating out of 5 and wrote, "There are matches to win, obstacles to overcome, and a new ally in the form of Zelda. It’s a fun, fast-paced episode, too. While this season hasn't returned to the half-hour outings of the show's first season, there's been a nice effort to keep the pace brisk. Now it's on to the FA Cup." Eric Francisco of Esquire wrote, "since season 2, the show has been a painful caricature of itself, and season 4 has only calcified all of its worst attributes. This week's episode doesn't come close to telling me the show is on any course correction — we're too far away for any miracles to happen now — but I have a glimmer of hope that it can recapture some of its bygone brilliance yet. But I know, I know. It's the hope that kills you."

Evan Davis of Decider wrote, "Some of Jason Sudeikis's and co-showrunner Jack Burditt's efforts to bring the audience inside the struggles of being a women's footballer in England have paid off. Some of them haven't. Yet one cannot dismiss the sincere effort on the writers' parts." Maggie Herriman of TV Fanatic gave the episode a 4.4 star rating out of 5 and wrote, "I think Ted Lasso Season 4 Episode 4 is a great step in establishing the team as a set of unique characters you want to root for, who can inspire the same dedication as the team we got to know and love over Ted Lasso's first three seasons."

Christopher Orr of The New York Times wrote, "After all, in the show's initial seasons, Ted's work in the men's locker room — the pep talks, the mind games — was the beating heart of Lasso-ism. How is he going to work his motivational magic if he can't reach the women's players where they (metaphorically) live?" Lara Rosales of Telltale TV gave the episode a perfect 5 rating out of 5 and wrote, "Ted Lasso Season 4 Episode 4, “Greyhounds’ Day Off,” is so far the best episode of the season. It serves as a reminder of why we fell in love with this show in the first place, and why Ted became a symbol of hope."
