= Yes & Baby =

- Ted Lasso episode
- Episode no.: Season 4 Episode 7
- Directed by: Erica Dunton
- Written by: Jane Becker; Bill Wrubel
- Cinematography by: David Rom
- Editing by: A.J. Catoline
- Original release date: September 16, 2026
- Running time: 41 minutes

Guest appearances
- Tracey Ullman as Zelda Southport; Mercedes Assad as Margy El Sharif; Annelise Heywood as Mady Song; Shannon Hayes as Shannon; Laura Haddock as Dr. Erin Beaumont; Charlotte Riley as stage manager

Episode chronology
← Previous "Don't Jump Around Much Anymore"	Next → "Follow the Anger"

"Yes & Baby" is the seventh episode of the fourth season of the American sports comedy-drama television series Ted Lasso, based on the character played by Jason Sudeikis in a series of promos for NBC Sports' coverage of England's Premier League. It is the 41st overall episode of the series and was written by executive producers Jane Becker and Bill Wrubel, and directed by Erica Dunton. It was released on Apple TV on September 16, 2026.

The series follows Ted Lasso, an American college football coach who is unexpectedly recruited to coach a fictional English Premier League soccer team, A.F.C. Richmond, despite having no experience coaching soccer. After helping the team reach second place in the Premier League, Ted returns home to be with his young son. In the episode, Ted and Beard help Alice when she returns to the club after her suspension, while Rebecca asks Zelda for help.

The episode received generally positive reviews from critics, who praised the episode's pacing and performances.

== Plot ==
Alice returns to Richmond for the first time since the suspension and (on the advice of a podcaster) resolves to "say yes" more often. While this is expected to improve her image in the team, Ted and Beard realize this is making things more complicated, such as allowing Lizzie to arrive late to training. They suggest using the "yes and" mantra of improvisational comedy, which helps Alice's dilemma.

Roy's greedy agent surprises Rebecca and Higgins when he asks for both Roy and Dani Rojas to leave Richmond, claiming Dani is being courted by more professional clubs. Desperate, Rebecca recurs to Zelda for help, who makes it clear she wants to take part in the club's operations. She uses her contacts to prevent Dani's exit, and Rebecca decides to hire her. Ted tries to set up a Bantr dating profile and asks Keeley to help him set it up. She posts his interests, but his detailed and funky nature makes it difficult to meet the site's limitations.

Roy returns to the club in a wheelchair, with Erin helping in his recovery. After his condition improves, Erin amicably parts ways with Roy, stating that she knows he loves Keeley. That night, Ted finishes setting up his Bantr account, but instead of activating it he deletes it. Instead, he returns to the theater where Jane performs her play. He meets with the stage manager he met before, where he asks her out on a date, but she declines since she has recently begun a new relationship. However, the manager says she would have gone out with him if she was single, disappointing Ted.

== Development ==
=== Production ===
The episode was written by executive producers Jane Becker and Bill Wrubel, and directed by Erica Dunton. This marked Becker's fourth writing credit, Wrubel's fourth writing credit, and Dunton's fifth directing credit.

== Critical response ==
"Yes & Baby" received generally positive reviews from critics. Saloni Gajjar of The A.V. Club gave the episode a "B" and wrote, "The parts of the seventh episode of Ted Lasso's fourth season with the Lady Greyhounds are so endearing, vital, and overdue, I'm tempted to move past other issues like the show's insistence on dragging out a will-they/won't-they we've already lived through. But since the torture continues, so does the complaining. The annoyance isn't just because of what Ted Lasso puts Roy, Keeley, and all of us through; it's because of what the two of them put poor Erin through. Has there ever been a clearer case of “this TV character is getting strung along for no reason” in recent memory?"

Keith Phipps of Vulture gave the episode a 4 star rating out of 5 and wrote, "After a couple of good-enough episodes, the season bounces back with “Yes & Baby,” in part because it feels kind of small after episodes focused on a big game and a big party. Here, we effectively get a day-in-the-life episode in which every character gets a moment or two, including the featured team members. We also, finally, get some Keeley scenes that aren’t defined by her yearning for Roy, a subplot that looks likely to be resolved soon. It's a reminder that every episode has to involve some kind of high drama and that Ted Lasso is often at its best when it doesn't feel like it's trying too hard." Kevin Dolak of The Hollywood Reporter wrote, "This episode of Ted Lasso is more like it. After last week's pseudo-bottle episode came up short, the Apple TV series packed in 44 minutes of character development, wrapped up mini plotlines and launched a classic, low-stakes dilemma for our titular football coach."

Eric Francisco of Esquire wrote, "You won't see a more concentrated instance of how funny and frustrating Ted Lasso can be at the same time than an overly long bit where Ted fills out his dating profile. In signature Lasso fashion, mundane questions are but prompts for Ted to run wild with his brand of mistaken yet sincere and wholesome wit. It's cute, mostly, until it gets embarrassing. I fail to find a more apt summary for Ted Lasso as a whole." Evan Davis of Decider wrote, "Lo and behold, Season 4 Episode 7, “Yes & Baby,” looks and feels like a normal television episode! It has been the shortest episode since Ted and the gang returned to England. You can feel a notable difference in how each scene and plot thread is paced. Is it any good? Not really. But we must still celebrate the small victories."

Christopher Orr of The New York Times wrote, "This is the episode where we finally have a meaningful story line involving one of the Richmond A.F.C. players. The problem is that it's not Lizzie or Gemma, whose subplots are pretty contained. In fact, it's not any of the women players. It's Dani Rojas, who isn't even on the show this season." Maggie Herriman of TV Fanatic gave the episode a 4.4 star rating out of 5.
