= Home (Ted Lasso) =

- Ted Lasso episode
- Episode no.: Season 4 Episode 1
- Directed by: Declan Lowney
- Written by: Joe Kelly
- Cinematography by: Bella Gonzales
- Editing by: Melissa McCoy
- Original release date: August 5, 2026
- Running time: 42 minutes

Guest appearances
- Andrea Anders as Michelle Keller; Grant Feely as Henry Lasso; Matteo van der Grijn as Matthijs; Suzanne Cryer as Tammy; Scott Speiser as Coach; Milan Carter as Charles; Alex Weisman as Principal Casey; James Earl as Joe Conrad; Hannah Ingle as Tabitha Conrad; Ira Amyx as Ronnie; Becky Ann Baker as Dottie Lasso

Episode chronology
← Previous "So Long, Farewell"	Next → "Curiouser and Curiouser!"

"Home" is the first episode of the fourth season of the American sports comedy-drama television series Ted Lasso, based on the character played by Jason Sudeikis in a series of promos for NBC Sports' coverage of England's Premier League. It is the 35th overall episode of the series and was written by series co-creator Joe Kelly, and directed by co-executive producer Declan Lowney. It was released on Apple TV on August 5, 2026.

The series follows Ted Lasso, an American college football coach who is unexpectedly recruited to coach a fictional English Premier League soccer team, AFC Richmond, despite having no experience coaching soccer. After helping the team reach second place in the Premier League, Ted returns home to be with his young son. In the episode, Ted is living in Kansas City, Missouri, co-parenting Henry with Michelle, when he is visited by Rebecca for a new offer in Richmond.

The episode received generally positive reviews from critics, who praised the episode's tone and performances, although some criticized its pacing and lack of plot progress.

== Plot ==
A couple of years after leaving AFC Richmond, Ted is still living in Kansas City, Missouri, working as a cashier at a grocery store. He is forced to end his shift early when he is summoned to Henry's high school for a parental meeting, alongside Michelle. A teacher was disturbed by a poem found in Henry's notebook, but Ted and Michelle realize he was quoting the song "Black Steel in the Hour of Chaos". Ted and Michelle are on good terms and continue co-parenting Henry, although Michelle has felt stressed with her job.

Returning home, Ted is surprised when Rebecca, Keeley and Higgins visit him. While catching up, they reveal Richmond has a new women's football team and want Ted to coach it, based on his success with the men's team. Ted hesitates, but says he will think about it. Privately, it is revealed that Richmond is facing financial problems, and they are facing the same challenge that plagues other women's teams in other clubs. Ted is also surprised when his mother starts selling her items as she plans to sell their childhood home.

During the visit, Rebecca discovers a fondness for Kansas City barbecue but ruins all of her outfits with the sauce, forcing her to buy an overly bedazzled outfit from a local boutique. Higgins, unable to visit the American Jazz Museum due to a private event, instead visits the Negro League Baseball Museum and is inspired by the career of Satchel Paige. Keeley's belief in the women's team is further inspired by a visit to CPKC Stadium as they watch a Kansas City Current game.

Afterwards, Rebecca, Keeley and Higgins board a plane to return to London. Back home, Ted continues thinking about the offer. During this, it is revealed that Roy won the FA Cup as manager of AFC Richmond, Jamie has left the team, and Trent Crimm is now writing for The Guardian newspaper. Ted texts Michelle and Henry about the idea of moving the whole family to London. To his surprise, they say it would be a good idea.

== Development ==
=== Production ===
The episode was directed by co-executive producer Declan Lowney and written by co-creator Joe Kelly. This was Lowney's ninth directing credit, and Kelly's eleventh writing credit.

=== Writing ===
Jason Sudeikis said that Ted's new life in Missouri consisted of "hiding out a little bit, and slowly puts the pieces together of a different way to go about this familiar situation from the inside out." He further added that the episode still needed to emphasize his love for soccer, "it's getting back to doing what he loves, which he was depriving himself of for one reason or another. That's open to interpretation. I have my theories."

Sudeikis also explained Ted's decision relying on his relationship with Ted's late father, "It's exactly what his mom says to him at the end of the first episode, where it's like, 'You loved being around your dad when he was doing something he loved, and he loved being a salesman,'" Sudeikis says. "Whatever he was selling, you've got to assume it was to make their lives better. He wasn't ripping people off or anything like that, and Ted loved seeing that. And so he's like, 'Oh, I'm depriving my own son. Here I am returning in the physical [sense], but am I there emotionally? Am I there on a soul level?' Because he's certainly there in proximity, which is important as a parent, 'but I'm not thriving from within. I'm depriving instead of thriving."

== Critical response ==
"Home" received generally positive reviews from critics. The review aggregator website Rotten Tomatoes reported a 100% approval rating for the episode, based on 8 reviews, with an average rating of 7.8/10.

Eric Goldman of IGN gave the episode a "good" 7 out of 10 rating and wrote in his verdict, "Ted Lasso sets the stage for its return with an extended prologue of sorts, explaining what Ted's been up to back in Kansas City before some old friends come calling in order to lure him back to coaching in London. Even though Season 3 often felt incredibly overstuffed, the core characters remained charming and likable, and that's underlined here by a premiere that focuses only on Ted, Rebecca, Leslie, and Keeley, reminding fans why we were drawn to them in the first place. It remains to be seen if Ted Lasso fully has its mojo back this season, and how the new team that Ted's coaching will compare to the former group, but for now it's a promising start."

Saloni Gajjar of The A.V. Club gave the episode a "C–" and wrote, "It's not like "Home" didn't excite me at all. It is nice to have a cheery Keeley back on my screen, to hear Ted Lasso-isms like "You can always give up tomorrow," and to see that Ted has learned to openly talk about his dead dad. There's some growth here, but the premiere would've landed better if it were a tight 25-minutes at best. As it currently stands, the premiere is a rough stepping stone to season four, but I'll take Ted Lasso's most famous piece of advice — be curious, not judgmental — as we dig into it every week."

Keith Phipps of Vulture gave the episode a 4 star rating out of 5 and wrote, "it's now clear season three didn't have to be a definitive end to the series. In fact, it pretty neatly laid the groundwork for a fourth season. So here we are with a new season, and so far, it's nice to have a chance to escape to Ted Lasso's world again." Hannah Abraham of Forbes wrote, "Incredibly little of the episode's forty-plus minutes were about football, and in a way it's reflective of what Ted's life has become, but come on. I am simply not interested in Mom Lasso's garage sale grift or a fabulous store manager I am never going to see again! Cut them out!"

Evan Davis of Decider wrote, "The episode is very much a Ted Lasso episode, for good and for ill. The season 4 premiere crystallizes what is so frequently maddening about this show. So laser-focused have Sudeikis and fellow showrunners Brendan Hunt and Joe Kelly been about having their characters find some measure of emotional self-acceptance that it drains the show of conflict nearly from the moment it arises." Maggie Herriman of TV Fanatic gave the episode a 3.25 star rating out of 5 and wrote, "while the episode does bring some enjoyable moments, the episode — running at 42 minutes — feels drawn out with filler as you follow Rebecca, Keeley, and Higgins on their journeys around Kansas City. Of course, it's full of BBQ sauce and shopping for bedazzled suits, but when it's not teasing the upcoming tension between Keeley's vigorous excitement for the women's team and Rebecca's financial pragmatism, it ultimately does little to advance the core plot."

Christopher Orr of The New York Times wrote, "Here, I think an early but brief digression is merited. Careful viewers of the show may recall a couple of past references to a "Ronnie Fowch," who bullied Ted as a schoolboy and was fond of a grotesque prank that involved getting someone to eat something he had put in a Butterfinger wrapper that was not a Butterfinger." Lara Rosales of Telltale TV gave the episode a perfect 5 rating out of 5 and wrote, "Ted Lasso returns exactly the way it started. It feels like the show we first fell in love with so many moons ago. The funny and heartwarming show that stole people's hearts, kept them going through a world pandemic, and earned several awards is back with a vengeance."
