= Ted Lasso =

American sports comedy-drama television series

- Genre: Sports comedy-drama
- Based on: Format and characters from NBC Sports
- Developed by: Jason Sudeikis; Bill Lawrence; Brendan Hunt; Joe Kelly
- Showrunners: Jason Sudeikis; Bill Lawrence; Brendan Hunt; Joe Kelly
- Starring: Jason Sudeikis; Hannah Waddingham; Jeremy Swift; Phil Dunster; Brett Goldstein; Brendan Hunt; Nick Mohammed; Juno Temple; Sarah Niles; Anthony Head; Toheeb Jimoh; Cristo Fernández; Kola Bokinni; Billy Harris; James Lance; Tanya Reynolds; Abbie Hern; Faye Marsay; Jude Mack; Aisling Sharkey; Rex Hayes
- Music by: Marcus Mumford; Tom Howe
- Country of origin: United States
- Original language: English
- No. of seasons: 4
- No. of episodes: 44

Production
- Executive producers: Bill Lawrence; Jason Sudeikis; Brendan Hunt; Joe Kelly; Jeff Ingold; Bill Wrubel
- Production location: London
- Running time: 29–78 minutes
- Production companies: Ruby's Tuna Inc.; Doozer; Universal Television; Warner Bros. Television

Original release
- Network: Apple TV+
- Release: August 14, 2020 – May 31, 2023
- Network: Apple TV
- Release: August 5, 2026 – present

Ted Lasso (/ˈlæsoʊ/ LASS-oh) is an American sports comedy-drama television series developed by Jason Sudeikis, Bill Lawrence, Brendan Hunt, and Joe Kelly. It is based on a character Sudeikis portrayed in a series of promotional media for NBC Sports's coverage of England's football Premier League. The show follows Ted Lasso, an American college football coach who is hired to coach an English football team, A.F.C. Richmond, whose owner secretly hopes his inexperience will lead it to failure; instead, Lasso's folksy, optimistic leadership proves unexpectedly successful. The first season of ten episodes premiered on Apple TV+ on August 14, 2020, with the first three episodes releasing immediately. A second season of twelve episodes followed on July 23, 2021, with the third season released on March 15, 2023, which was intended to be the final season. It was announced in March 2025 that the series had been renewed for a fourth season, which premiered on August 5, 2026.

The series has received critical acclaim, with particular praise for its performances (notably Sudeikis, Hannah Waddingham, Phil Dunster, Brett Goldstein, Nick Mohammed, and Juno Temple), humor, writing, themes, and uplifting tone. Among other accolades, its first season was nominated for 20 Primetime Emmy Awards, becoming the most nominated first-season comedy in Emmy history. Sudeikis, Waddingham, and Goldstein won for their performances, and the series won the 2021 Primetime Emmy Award for Outstanding Comedy Series. Sudeikis also won the Golden Globe Award for Best Actor – Television Series Musical or Comedy and the Screen Actors Guild Award for Outstanding Performance by a Male Actor in a Comedy Series. The series repeated all three of those award wins the next year.

== Premise ==
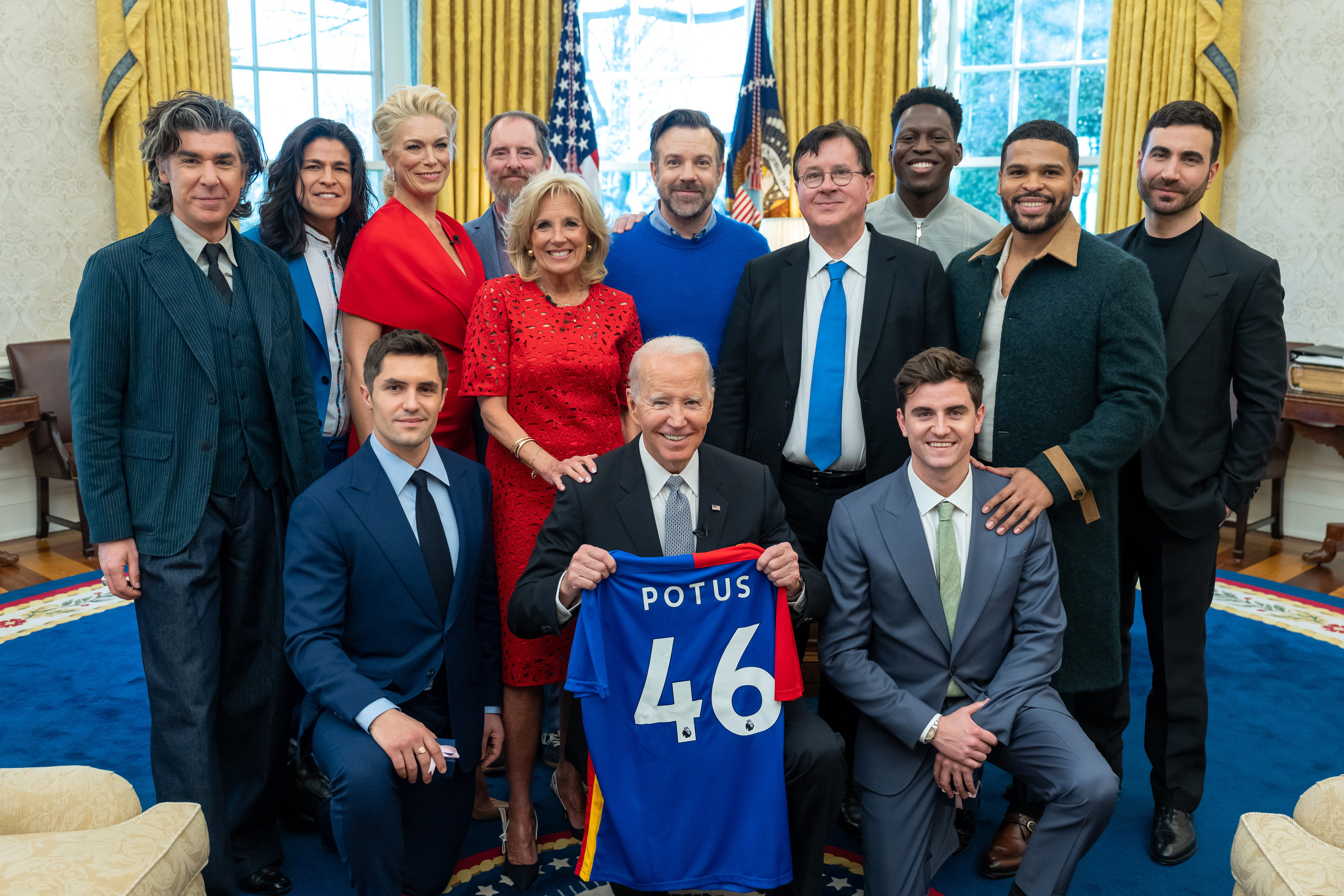
President Joe Biden, holding an AFC Richmond jersey, and First Lady Jill Biden greet the cast of Ted Lasso in the Oval Office on March 20, 2023

Ted Lasso, an American college football coach, is unexpectedly recruited to coach a fictional English Premier League soccer team, A.F.C. Richmond, despite having no experience coaching soccer. The team's owner, Rebecca Welton, gained ownership of the team in a divorce from her unfaithful ex-husband, Rupert. She has hired Lasso, secretly hoping he will cause the team's downfall and devastate Rupert, who cared more about AFC Richmond than anything else. However, Ted's charm, personality, and humor begin to win over Rebecca, the team, and those who had been skeptical about his appointment.

== Cast and characters ==
=== Main ===
- Jason Sudeikis as Ted Lasso, an American college football coach from the Kansas City metropolitan area who is hired to coach AFC Richmond, an English soccer team. He is frequently ridiculed for his folksy optimism and inexperience with the sport, but gradually wins people over through his kind and compassionate approach to coaching. Ted joins Richmond halfway through Richmond's season in the Premier League, and gets relegated to the Championship. He manages to lead them back to the Premier League, and then finishes as runner-up in his third year at the club. Ted leaves Richmond at the end of Season 3 to be closer to his son, and migrates back to the UK with his family in Season 4, returning to Richmond as head coach of the club's women's team.
- Hannah Waddingham as Rebecca Welton, the new owner of AFC Richmond. Having gained ownership of the team through a divorce settlement with her philandering ex-husband Rupert Mannion, Rebecca hires Lasso as part of a ploy to ruin the club, the only thing her ex-husband truly loved. She eventually comes to appreciate Lasso as a coach and works with him to improve the club's standings within the English soccer league system. Rebecca is especially close with Keeley Jones, the club's PR specialist, and eventually becomes an angel investor for Keeley's PR firm.
- Jeremy Swift as Leslie Higgins, the timid but quirky Director of Football Operations at AFC Richmond. Higgins was indirectly responsible for Rebecca's divorce due to covering for his ex-boss Rupert during his affairs. Higgins is opposed to Rebecca's plans to sabotage Ted's efforts and eventually quits his post after the two fall out. They eventually reconcile, and Higgins returns to Richmond for the long haul. A jazz enthusiast and musician (who plays the double bass), Higgins has a large family with five sons.
- Phil Dunster as Jamie Tartt (seasons 1–3; guest season 4), a talented young forward, on loan to Richmond from Manchester City in Season 1. Despite his talent, Tartt is extremely arrogant and believes himself to be superior to the other Richmond players. After pursuing an opportunity to appear on a dating reality show, he struggles to get his life back on track when he is eliminated and Manchester City drops him from their team. Eventually rejoining Richmond, Jamie slowly learns the value of teamwork and transitions into a more versatile attacking midfielder, developing his playmaking skills in addition to scoring. Prior to the events of Season 4, Jamie had transferred to FC Barcelona for the new season, and returns to Richmond as a guest to endorse his new line of vodka, reuniting with Keeley, Rebecca, and Roy.
- Brett Goldstein as Roy Kent, a veteran box-to-box midfielder. Kent is Richmond's captain at the start of the series, until a tackle on Tartt in a match against Manchester City ends his career in professional soccer. Kent does a brief stint as a commentator before realizing that he misses being on the pitch and returns to Richmond as an assistant coach. At the end of season 3, Kent is appointed as Richmond's new manager following Ted's departure. In Season 4, Roy is still the head coach of the Richmond men's team, and has led them to an FA Cup victory and several Champions League appearances. Kent is primarily based on hot-headed Irish former footballer Roy Keane.
- Brendan Hunt as Coach Willis Beard, Lasso's grounded, laconic longtime assistant coach and friend from Peoria, Illinois. Beard originally met Ted through college football and eventually fell into trouble with the law, with Ted coming to his aid and helping him get back on his feet. Throughout the series, Beard is in an on-off relationship with a London woman named Jane, whom he met through playing chess. At the end of Season 3, Beard chooses to remain in the UK, staying on as an assistant coach for AFC Richmond and marrying Jane in a ceremony at Stonehenge. In Season 4, Kent releases Beard from the men's team, allowing him to rejoin Ted as assistant coach for the women's team.
- Nick Mohammed as Nathan "Nate" Shelley (seasons 1–3; guest season 4), AFC Richmond's original equipment manager who is promoted to assistant coach in Season 2. Despite his tactical brilliance, being dubbed the "Wonder Kid" after an inspired substitution which results in a Richmond victory over Tottenham in the FA Cup, Nate is insecure about his abilities. This eventually results in him falling out with Ted after believing the latter has forsaken him and leads him to become the manager of West Ham United under Rupert Mannion's ownership. Nate eventually reconciles with Ted and the other members of Richmond, eventually quitting West Ham and returning to Richmond. Prior to Season 4, Nate leaves Richmond to coach the Polish national football team, marries Jade (a server at his family's favorite restaurant), and has a daughter with her named Athena.
- Juno Temple as Keeley Jones, a model who also works as Richmond's Chief Marketing Officer. At the start of the series, Keeley is dating Jamie Tartt but breaks up with him after realizing his immaturity and arrogance are not a good fit for her. She later enters into a relationship with Roy Kent throughout the second season, though they break up in Season 3 due to conflicting schedules and extra duties. Keeley eventually leaves the club to start her own PR firm and retains Richmond as one of her biggest clients. Keeley is bisexual, having had relationships with Tartt, Kent, and later Jack Danvers, the female venture capitalist who finances her company. At the end of the third season, Keeley has rebuilt her firm with Rebecca as her angel investor, following her falling out with Jack. Keeley returns in Season 4 as Richmond's official Chief Marketing Officer, promoting the club's women's team. She eventually rekindles her relationship with Roy, and becomes pregnant with their child.
- Sarah Niles as Dr. Sharon M. Fieldstone (season 2; recurring season 3; guest season 4), a sports psychologist. Sharon is initially hired by Richmond to help Dani Rojas, who suffered from the yips (after his penalty kick accidentally kills the club's mascot). She stays to help the players and staff with their mental health. She helps Ted with his mental health throughout the season and continues his therapy after her contract with Richmond expires. At the end of Season 3, Sharon is hired by Richmond full-time as their resident head of mental health and emotional well-being.
- Anthony Head as Rupert Mannion (season 3; recurring season 1; guest season 2), Rebecca's vindictive, philandering ex-husband, the former owner of AFC Richmond and later the owner of West Ham United.
- Toheeb Jimoh as Samuel "Sam" Obisanya (season 3; recurring seasons 1–2; guest season 4), Richmond's right-back, who later converts to playing as a right winger. Sam is from Nigeria and is passionate about environmental issues, driving a Tesla and boycotting AFC Richmond's sponsor when it is revealed they are destroying his homeland's natural environment. Outside of football, Sam is also a restaurateur and owns a Nigerian-themed restaurant named "Ola's" (after his father). In Season 4, it is revealed that Obisanya left Richmond to play for Manchester United.
- Cristo Fernández as Dani Rojas (season 3; recurring seasons 1–2; guest season 4), an enthusiastic player from Mexico who joins Richmond as a forward half way through the first season, after recovering from an injury. Enthusiastic, upbeat, and passionate, Dani's philosophy is "football is life"; he eventually becomes a core part of Richmond's starting lineup, playing as a second striker.
- Kola Bokinni as Isaac McAdoo (season 3; recurring seasons 1–2; guest season 4), a center-back for team Richmond. After Roy Kent retires from the team, he chooses Isaac as his successor as captain. Isaac initially struggles with leadership, but he recovers and becomes an effective captain as the season progresses. He is close friends with Colin Hughes and was resentful that Colin did not feel comfortable sharing his sexual orientation with him. The two eventually make amends over a game of FIFA. Besides his defending, Isaac has an especially powerful kick and scored an equalizing penalty in Richmond's final match against West Ham.
- Billy Harris as Colin Hughes (season 3; recurring seasons 1–2; guest season 4), Richmond's left winger who comes from Wales. Colin is initially closeted; his sexual orientation is revealed during a match when one of the fans yells a homophobic slur and captain Isaac McAdoo goes to confront him in the stands. Colin then comes out to the team and makes amends with McAdoo. Colin is a supercar enthusiast, owning several exotic vehicles including a Lamborghini Huracán Evo, and a Noble M500. In Season 4, it is revealed that Hughes has left Richmond and now plays for Welsh club Wrexham.
- James Lance as Trent Crimm (season 3; recurring seasons 1–2; guest season 4), a cynical, pragmatic sports reporter for The Independent who is a regular member of the press at Richmond's media conferences. Trent is fired at the end of the second season for revealing his anonymous source regarding Ted's panic attacks, though he remains on good terms with Ted. In the third season, Trent is a freelance writer who spends the season with Richmond to author a book about the club, which is ultimately titled The Richmond Way. Like Colin Hughes, Trent is gay, and came out to his family prior to the series. Trent returns in Season 4 as the host of his own podcast, Through the Laces.
- Tanya Reynolds as Alice Chilton (season 4), the hard-to-crack assistant coach of AFC Richmond's women's team. A former professional midfielder, Alice's career on the pitch came to an end after multiple ACL injuries in rapid succession. She was Rebecca's backup choice in the event that Ted declined her request to coach, and chose to tender her resignation after feeling her abilities had been overlooked and that Rebecca favored Ted simply because he was a man. However, Ted convinces her to stay on after reminding her of her love of the sport and the people under her charge. Throughout the season, Alice learns to loosen up and bond with the players under her care, and is eventually promoted at Ted's recommendation to become manager of the AFC Richmond women's team.
- Abbie Hern as Gemma Jay (season 4), a striker for the women's team. Gemma used to play football with Alice, until she quit due to Alice's harsh criticism. Gemma is studying law when Alice and Ted visit her school to request her to join their team. Though she initially refuses, Gemma remembers her love for the game, and joins Richmond as a striker, choosing to juggle both soccer and law school.
- Faye Marsay as Lizzie Davis (season 4), a center-back and captain for the women's team who is also a single mother. Lizzie joins the team through an open tryout to bolster the team's ranks, and juggles her career with being a parent for her two sons.
- Jude Mack as Katie "Boots" Quinn (season 4), the goalkeeper for the Richmond Women's team. Boots is known for choosing to not wear gloves while she plays, claiming that she prefers to feel the ball as is. However, in the critical game against Bristol City, Boots suffers from a broken finger, and receives a pair of gloves from Coach Beard, which she uses for the second half of the match and for the final game of the season.
- Rex Hayes and Aisling Sharkey as Siobhan and Niamh Harrigan (season 4), the left and right-backs on the women's team. Siobhan is the older twin (by about three minutes), and the twins are always sparring and aiming to outperform each other on the pitch. Despite their rivalry, the twins are close (almost to the point of having extra-sensory perception), and work incredibly well together on the pitch. The twins score a critical goal in the club's penultimate match of the season to secure promotion, with Niamh assisting Siobhan in obtaining an equalizer against Bristol City.

=== Recurring ===
==== AFC Richmond personnel ====
- Stephen Manas as Richard Montlaur (seasons 1–3, guest season 4), a young, womanizing French midfielder.
- Moe Jeudy-Lamour as Thierry Zoreaux (seasons 1–3, guest season 4), a French-Canadian goalkeeper and a close friend of Isaac's. In Season 3, after being inspired by Zava joining the team, Zoreaux changes his name to "Van Damme" (after Jean-Claude Van Damme). He eventually settles for "Zorro", after suffering a broken nose during a World Cup match against Dani and having to play with a protective face mask.
- Charlie Hiscock as Will Kitman (seasons 2–3; guest seasons 1 & 4), the new equipment manager after Nate's promotion.
- David Elsendoorn as Jan Maas (seasons 2–3, guest season 4), a Dutch center back known for his blunt personality, who transferred to Richmond from Ajax.
- Moe Hashim as Moe Bumbercatch (seasons 1–3, guest season 4), a Swiss midfielder who is close friends with Richard.
- Ash Bayliss as Arlo Dixon, Richmond's English right back. He is named after Arlo White and Lee Dixon.
- Flaurese as Gareth Canterbury (seasons 1–2), Richmond's reserve left back, who is from Slough. His name and hometown are a reference to the British version of The Office, namely its characters Gareth Keenan and Tim Canterbury.
- Maximilian Osinski as Zava (season 3), a talented but eccentric striker. Zava has a tendency to only stay with clubs for a single season, single-handedly carrying their teams to victory. In Season 3, Zava initially intends to sign for Chelsea, but is swayed to join West Ham after a conversation with Rupert, and then eventually chooses to sign with Richmond after being convinced by Rebecca. Zava leads Richmond on a significant win-streak, before suddenly retiring from professional football to work on his family's avocado farm. At the end of Season 3, Zava sends his former Richmond teammates a care package consisting of T-shirts and a large avocado. Zava is based on Swedish striker Zlatan Ibrahimović, with Osinski also basing his performance on French forward Eric Cantona.
- Shannon Hayes as Shannon Stone (season 4; guest seasons 1–3), the recurring "Soccer Girl" who occasionally bumps into Ted around Richmond. In Season 4, Shannon applies to join Richmond via open tryout. Although she is not as skilled as the other players, Ted decides to accept her onto the women's team. Shannon eventually makes her debut in a critical game against Bristol City, scoring a decisive goal which secures Richmond's promotion.
- Mercedes Assad as Margy El Sherif (season 4), a member of the women's team dating her teammate, Mady Song
- Annelise Heywood as Mady Song (season 4), a member of the women's team dating her teammate, Margy El Sherif

==== Other characters ====
- Annette Badland as Mae Green, the landlady of the Crown and Anchor pub in Richmond. Frequented by Ted Lasso, Coach Beard, and AFC Richmond fans, the pub is a staunch part of the local community. Mae purchases a large number of shares of AFC Richmond at the end of Season 3, and fervently supports the women's team throughout Season 4, even getting the opportunity to travel on the team bus to an away game against Bristol City. Mae dies at the end of the match, leaving the pub to Baz, Jeremy and Paul, and her 2% stake in Richmond to Rebecca.
- Gus Turner (seasons 1–3) and Grant Feely (season 4) as Henry Lasso, Ted's son.
- Adam Colborne, Bronson Webb and Kevin Garry as Basil "Baz" Primrose, Jeremy Blumenthal, and Paul La Fleur, a trio of die-hard AFC Richmond fans and regulars at Mae's pub. The three regularly associate with coaches Ted Lasso and Coach Beard at the pub, and even spend an evening with the latter out on the town. The three pool their money to purchase a single share of AFC Richmond, and eventually inherit the Crown and Anchor from Mae after she passes away.
- Mary Roscoe as Julie Higgins (seasons 1–3; guest season 4), Leslie's wife. Mary Roscoe is married to actor Jeremy Swift, who plays her husband on the show.
- Keeley Hazell as Bex (season 1; guest seasons 2–3), Rupert's new girlfriend and eventual third wife.
- Ellie Taylor as Flo "Sassy" Collins (seasons 1–3), Rebecca's best friend who becomes attracted to Ted.
- Tom Cotcher as Mr. Mann, an elderly AFC Richmond supporter who frequently subjects Ted to well-meaning abuse.
- Phoebe Walsh as Jane Payne (season 2; guest seasons 1, 3–4), Coach Beard's on-and-off girlfriend, and eventual wife.
- Elodie Blomfield as Phoebe (seasons 2–4; guest season 1), Roy's niece.
- Bill Fellows as George Cartrick (season 2; guest seasons 1, 3), the former Richmond coach whom Ted replaced; later a panelist on Soccer Saturday, and Nate's replacement after he quits West Ham United.
- Ruth Bradley as Ms. Bowen (season 2; guest season 3), Phoebe's teacher.
- Andrea Anders as Michelle (Keller) Lasso (seasons 3–4; guest seasons 1–2), Ted's ex-wife.
- Edyta Budnik as Jade (season 3; guest seasons 2 & 4), the hostess of A Taste of Athens in Tooting, the Shelley family's favorite restaurant. Nate develops a crush on her, and successfully asks her out in Season 3. Jade makes a cameo in Season 4, where it is revealed she has married Nate and has a daughter with him.
- Katy Wix as Barbara (seasons 3–4), CFO of KJPR and later joint head of KBPR, whose practical, no-nonsense personality often clashes with Keeley's sunny personality.
- Ambreen Razia as Shandy Fine (season 3), a modelling friend of Keeley who joins KJPR
- Jodi Balfour as Jack Danvers (season 3), a venture capitalist and the angel investor of Keeley Jones' PR firm. Jack and Keeley date briefly in Season 3, and eventually break up after falling out.
- Rosie Lou as Ms. Kakes (season 3), Rupert's assistant at West Ham
- Spencer Jones as Deryck (season 3), the owner of Nate's favorite restaurant
- Precious Mustapha as Simi (season 3), chef at Sam's restaurant
- Matteo van der Grijn as Matthijs (season 4; guest season 3), a Dutch Airlines pilot who lives on a houseboat in Amsterdam. Matthijs meets Rebecca after a friendly match against Ajax, and helps her recover after she is knocked into the canal by an errant cyclist. The two eventually begin a romantic relationship, and he regularly visits Rebecca in Season 4.

=== Guests ===
- Kieran O'Brien as James Tartt (seasons 1–3), Jamie's abusive father
- Jimmy Akingbola as Ollie (season 1), Ted's driver when he arrives in England, who also works at his family's Indian restaurant
- Kiki May as Nora (season 2), Sassy's teenage daughter and Rebecca's goddaughter
- Harriet Walter as Deborah (seasons 2–4), Rebecca's mother
- Sofia Barclay as Dr. Jenni O'Sullivan (seasons 2–4), an ER doctor and surgeon who treated Sharon after her bike accident, later confirmed to be Roy's sister and Phoebe's mother
- Sam Richardson as Edwin Akufo (seasons 2–3), a petty Ghanaian billionaire who buys Raja Casablanca and tries to convince Sam to sign with the team
- Edwin De La Renta as Francis (seasons 2–3), Edwin Akufo's assistant and handshake surrogate
- Scott Van Pelt as himself (season 1), a SportsCenter anchor who breaks the news regarding Ted's hiring at AFC Richmond
- Karen Johal as Nicole Shelley (season 3), Nate's sister
- Sam Liu as Michael (season 3), Colin's boyfriend
- Nonso Anozie as Ola Obisanya (seasons 2–3), Sam's father
- Becky Ann Baker as Dottie Lasso (seasons 3–4), Ted's mother
- Leanne Best as Georgie (season 3), Jamie's mother
- Steve Edge as Simon (season 3), Jamie's stepfather
- Laura Haddock as Dr. Erin Beaumont (season 4), a doctor at the local hospital, and Jenni's colleague.
- Tracey Ullman as Zelda Southport (season 4), a wildly eccentric entrepreneur who bankrolls various women's sports teams across Europe and the US, while also challenging the patriarchy.

=== Notable cameos ===
Many sports and television entertainment personalities appeared on the show, often appearing as themselves in cameo roles throughout the series:

- Lloyd Griffith as Lloyd (seasons 1–3), one of the regular reporters at the AFC Richmond press conferences
- Arlo White and Chris Powell as themselves (seasons 1–3), providing commentary for AFC Richmond's matches
- Jeff Stelling (seasons 1–3), Chris Kamara (seasons 1–2), Paul Merson and Clinton Morrison (season 3) as themselves, as presenter and pundits on Sky Sports Soccer Saturday, the show in which Roy briefly appears
- Thierry Henry and Gary Lineker as themselves (seasons 2–3), playing soccer pundits.
- Seema Jaswal and Ian Wright (season 2) as themselves, as a soccer TV show presenter and pundit
- Fleur East as herself (season 2), the host of Lust Conquers All, the reality dating show that Jamie appears on
- Mike Dean as himself (seasons 2–3), the referee who officiates several of AFC Richmond's games
- Holly Willoughby and Phillip Schofield as themselves (season 2), presenters of ITV's This Morning who interview Jamie about his appearance on Lust Conquers All. Dermot O'Leary and Alison Hammond appear on the show in Season 4.
- Eni Aluko as Georgia (season 2), a member of the street soccer team in the second season.
- Peter Crouch, Tom Fordyce, and Chris Stark (seasons 2–3), who are members of That Peter Crouch Podcast are heard in radio show clips describing current events at Richmond.
- Rebecca Lowe and Jermaine Jenas as themselves (season 3), presenter and pundit on the Premier League Round-up show. Lowe also appears in season 4 as a stadium commentator alongside Jill Scott.
- Colin Mochrie and Ryan Stiles (season 3), who are heard (but not seen) as Canadian TV soccer commentators Lanny and Bruce in season 3's "International Break".
- Pep Guardiola as himself (season 3), manager of Manchester City.
- Kasali Casal, Lee Hendrie, Jermaine Pennant, George Elokobi and Jay Bothroyd as opposition players (seasons 1–3).

== Episodes ==
Season	Episodes	Originally released		
Season	Episodes	First released	Last released	Network
1	10	August 14, 2020	October 2, 2020	Apple TV+
2	12	July 23, 2021	October 8, 2021	Apple TV+
3	12	March 15, 2023	May 31, 2023	Apple TV+
4	10	August 5, 2026	October 7, 2026	Apple TV

=== Season 1 (2020) ===
No. overall	No. in season	Title	Directed by	Written by	Original release date
1	1	"Pilot"	Tom Marshall	Story by : Jason Sudeikis & Bill Lawrence & Brendan Hunt & Joe Kelly; Teleplay by : Jason Sudeikis & Bill Lawrence	August 14, 2020
Rebecca Welton acquires the fictional AFC Richmond, a struggling club in the Premier League, as part of the settlement in her recent divorce. To get revenge on her ex-husband who cheated on her repeatedly and was never blamed for it, Rebecca resolves to ruin the club, as it was the only thing her ex ever loved. To this end she hires Ted Lasso, an American college football coach from Wichita, Kansas, who recently coached an NCAA Division II football team to a title but knows nothing about soccer. Arriving in Richmond with his assistant, Coach Beard, he is met with hostility and resentment from his new team as well as a roomful of belligerent sports reporters, who find his sense of humor and folksy charm off-putting. In his apartment that night, he speaks to his son and wife on the phone and hints that he took the job because his wife felt she "needed space".
2	2	"Biscuits"	Zach Braff	Story by : Brendan Hunt & Jason Sudeikis; Teleplay by : Joe Kelly	August 14, 2020
On his first day at AFC Richmond, Ted brings Rebecca shortbread as a present; she rebuffs his attempt at friendliness but loves the biscuits, and orders her assistant Higgins to find out where Ted gets them. Ted observes that perpetually grumpy team captain Roy Kent is at odds with talented but egotistical striker Jamie Tartt. Learning that Sam Obisanya is homesick for Nigeria, Ted throws him a birthday party the next game day even though the team has just lost. To win over Jamie, Ted seeks advice from Jamie's girlfriend Keeley, a model. She advises 'positive reinforcement', which Ted uses in a short discussion with Jamie. In an attempt to cause more problems for the team, Rebecca has a tabloid photograph taken of Lasso and Keeley seemingly being publicly intimate. It is revealed that Ted himself bakes the biscuits he gives Rebecca.
3	3	"Trent Crimm: The Independent"	Tom Marshall	Jane Becker	August 14, 2020
Knowing that tabloid newspaper The Sun has photographs of them, Ted and Keeley go to Rebecca. She has their publication stopped, fearful they will be traced back to her, but in exchange, Ted has to spend the day with Trent Crimm, a cynical reporter for The Independent. Ted tells him openly that the team's new plays were conceived by Nate, the kit man. When Trent asks him about his decision to throw a party after the previous week's loss, Ted tells him he's not concerned with wins and losses. Trent goes with Ted and Roy to a local school event and sees them win over the children. Ted then invites Trent to dinner at a restaurant owned by the family of the driver who met him at the airport; unused to Indian food, Ted is surprised by how spicy it is but eats it all (including Trent's) to be polite. Trent's write-up about the "Lasso Way" is thoughtfully positive, which exasperates Rebecca.
4	4	"For the Children"	Tom Marshall	Jamie Lee	August 21, 2020
The team loses again, prompting Roy and Jamie nearly to come to blows. Rebecca, whilst preparing to host an annual charity ball and auction, learns that musician Robbie Williams has suddenly canceled on her, so she presses Higgins to find another musical act. Rupert Mannion, Rebecca's ex-husband, arrives at the event and takes over the auction. Ted deduces that Rupert, wanting to embarrass Rebecca, was responsible for Robbie Williams' last-minute cancellation. Rebecca warms to Keeley, and her remark about holding people accountable convinces Keeley to break up with Jamie. Thanks to Ted's intervention, Roy and Jamie begin to develop mutual respect for each other as footballers. Ted helps Higgins hire a neighborhood street performer to replace Williams, and he meets with a great reception. Rebecca, infuriated at Rupert's sudden appearance (and the fact that he donated one million pounds to the charity event to show her up) gets drunk with Keeley, and the two ride off in a rickshaw.
5	5	"Tan Lines"	Elliot Hegarty	Brett Goldstein	August 28, 2020
Ted's wife, Michelle, and son, Henry, arrive for a visit, and they have fun together as a family until Ted finds his wife in tears. She confides in him that she doesn't love him anymore and has no idea why; she promises to keep trying. Keeley attends a promotion shoot she had set up for Jamie. Rebecca and Roy both seem concerned that Keeley is wasting her time with Jamie, but she assures them that the relationship is over. On the field, Jamie continues refusing to pass to his teammates, scoring goals alone; fans and commentators begin to believe that AFC Richmond relies solely on Jamie to score. Ted sees this is bad for team morale and benches Jamie right before half-time, which is met with harsh criticism from fans. Unfazed, Ted encourages his team to embrace change and believe in themselves. The team, working together, break the 2–2 tie to win the match. That evening, as Henry and Michelle prepare to leave, Ted tells Michelle that she does not need to try for his sake to make their marriage work.
6	6	"Two Aces"	Elliot Hegarty	Bill Wrubel	September 4, 2020
Ted struggles emotionally with the end of his marriage but is buoyed by Richmond's first win. The press continues to treat Rebecca badly, calling her "Old Rebecca" when Bex, whose name is also Rebecca, begins dating Rupert. Jamie and Ted continue to clash over his role with the team, but Jamie sees his power weaken when Dani Rojas, an enthusiastic new player who is as good as he is, joins the team. But after Dani is injured by "something not there", Ted learns of ghosts that have haunted the team's treatment room since World War I. To lift the curse, Ted has everyone on the team bring in something special to them to offer as a sacrifice, and even Jamie joins in, after inspirational words from Keeley. The next morning, Ted discovers that Jamie has been returned to Manchester City, which had loaned Jamie to AFC Richmond for the season. Dani tries to cheer him up, but it doesn't help.
7	7	"Make Rebecca Great Again"	Declan Lowney	Story by : Joe Kelly & Brendan Hunt; Teleplay by : Jason Sudeikis	September 11, 2020
AFC Richmond travels to Liverpool for its game against rivals Everton, a team they have been unable to beat for sixty years. The game is being held on the weekend of Rebecca and Rupert's wedding anniversary, so Keeley tags along to cheer Rebecca up. Rebecca's old friend Flo "Sassy" Collins shows up and immediately takes a liking to Ted. That night, Ted, reluctant to sign his divorce papers, gets drunk and snaps at Nate. The next morning, Ted apologizes and asks Nate to share some of his ideas. Nate gives the team an eye-opening pre-game speech, and they win the game. That evening, the team goes out to celebrate at a karaoke bar, where Rebecca reveals her beautiful singing voice. Ted enjoys the evening until he suffers a panic attack and stumbles out of the building, where Rebecca finds and comforts him. Ted retreats to his hotel room and signs his divorce papers, then Sassy comes calling. Roy kisses Keeley, but leaves abruptly. Rebecca invites a hotel waiter to her room.
8	8	"The Diamond Dogs"	Declan Lowney	Leann Bowen	September 18, 2020
Back at their home stadium at Nelson Road, Ted discusses his night with Sassy with Beard, Nate, and Higgins, and they nickname their group the "Diamond Dogs". Keeley asks Roy to go out for coffee but he declines. Later that night, Jamie visits Keeley, and she asks him to stay. The next day Keeley admits to Roy that she slept with Jamie, and Roy talks to Ted and the Diamond Dogs, who help Roy see another perspective. Ted thanks Rebecca for her help during his panic attack and offers to help her when she meets two minority shareholders later that day at Mae's pub. There Rebecca is blindsided by Rupert, who announces that he helped Bex – now his fiancee – to purchase the minority shares. In response, Ted makes a wager with Rupert over a game of darts, which Ted wins, much to Rebecca's delight. On their way to dinner, Keeley and Roy's kiss is caught on camera by a paparazzo, but Roy forcefully takes the camera's memory card. The next day, Higgins implores Rebecca to stop trying to ruin the team and quits when she refuses. Keeley storms in, having discovered the picture of her and Ted on the camera card and realizing that publishing it was Rebecca's idea. She threatens to tell Ted if Rebecca does not do so herself.
9	9	"All Apologies"	MJ Delaney	Phoebe Walsh	September 25, 2020
Rebecca still has not told Ted about her attempts to sabotage the team. At Keeley's prompting, Rebecca tries to tell Ted but finds she cannot. Immediately afterward, Rupert comes to tell her that he and Bex are having a baby. Rebecca marches down to Ted's office and confesses, and to her surprise, he easily forgives her. Having been forgiven by Ted, Rebecca seeks out and apologizes to Higgins, who returns to the club. In the pub, Ted again states he is not concerned about wins, but Beard angrily reminds him that these are professional athletes, not students, so winning is important to them (and to him). Roy is showing his age on the pitch, and there are calls to bench him. The next day at practice, Roy surprises Ted by showing up and donning a second team pinny, accepting his new role while still leading the team as they approach their last match.
10	10	"The Hope That Kills You"	MJ Delaney	Story by : Joe Kelly & Jason Sudeikis; Teleplay by : Brendan Hunt	October 2, 2020
Nate is promoted to assistant coach, and he shows a video interview with Jamie to motivate the team. After Jamie insults Richmond, Isaac smashes the screen. Rebecca suggests that Ted can confuse the other team by running chaotic trick plays. Roy passes his captain's armband to Isaac. In the final match of the season, Manchester City leads 1–0 in the second half, but Roy injures his knee chasing and tackling Jamie; he receives a thunderous ovation as he leaves the field. Richmond runs the "Lasso special" trick play and scores to tie the match. However, in the final seconds, Jamie makes a pass to a teammate who scores, winning the game for Manchester City. Consequently, Richmond are relegated to the Championship. As he passes the visitors' locker room, Ted observes Jamie being berated by his father for passing the ball and not making the goal himself. The heartbroken team, coaches, and friends gather in the locker room where Ted points out that being sad about the loss is bearable because they can all be sad together instead of being sad alone. Meeting with Rebecca the next day, Ted attempts to resign, but she refuses. Instead, they decide to win promotion next season and then to win the Premier League once they are back.

=== Season 2 (2021) ===
No. overall	No. in season	Title	Directed by	Written by	Original release date
11	1	"Goodbye Earl"	Declan Lowney	Brendan Hunt	July 23, 2021
The episode starts midseason, as Richmond has drawn their last seven games. Dani prepares to kick a game-winning penalty, but he accidentally kills Richmond's greyhound mascot Earl; his resulting remorse cripples his ability to play. To help Dani recover from his "yips", Richmond hires sports psychologist Sharon Fieldstone, whose direct, no-nonsense attitude contrasts with Ted's. After meeting with Sharon, Dani regains his enthusiasm for football and converts a corner kick goal in practice. As a result, more players begin to request sessions with Sharon. Meanwhile, a newly retired Roy is coaching the Under-9 Girls Football team his niece, Phoebe, plays on, and dating Keeley. Jamie is shown to be a contestant on Lust Conquers All, a Love Island-style reality show.
12	2	"Lavender"	Declan Lowney	Leann Bowen	July 30, 2021
After Jamie is evicted from Lust Conquers All, he is surprised to learn that Manchester City have dropped him from the team. Higgins hires Sharon for the rest of the season. Jamie tells Ted that he would like to rejoin Richmond, and that he only left Man City for the show to annoy his abusive father. Ted politely declines Jamie's request to rejoin. When a photo of their conversation goes viral, Sam believes that Jamie, who repeatedly bullied him, is returning and angrily storms off during practice. Ted assures Sam that he refused. After Phoebe's team lose their championship game, Keeley convinces Roy to try out a pundit job at Sky Sports. Despite his habitual cursing, Roy's commentary is positively received by the public, and the network asks him to return. Wanting to give Jamie a second chance, Ted reconsiders adding him to the team and polls the Diamond Dogs on their opinions. Higgins votes for the addition, while Beard and Nate vote against it. Roy admits to Keeley that he enjoyed being on the TV show. Jamie rejoins Richmond, to the players' confusion.
13	3	"Do the Right-est Thing"	Ezra Edelman	Ashley Nicole Black	August 6, 2021
The team does not take kindly to Jamie's return, despite his apologies for his past behavior. On Keeley's advice, Jamie visits Sharon. Sassy's 13-year-old daughter Nora (also Rebecca's goddaughter) comes to visit and spends a day with Rebecca at work. Sam participates in a photo shoot for Dubai Air, the team's sponsor, but later learns from his father that Dubai Air is owned by an oil company polluting his home country of Nigeria. He withdraws from the ad campaign, prompting pressure on Rebecca from Dubai Air to fire Sam; but she holds firm at Nora's urging. Before Richmond's next game, Sam and fellow Nigerian players Isaac and Winchester use tape to cover their uniforms' Dubai Air logos in protest. Jamie leads the rest of the team to follow suit. Ted lets Sam speak about Dubai Air's malfeasance and the Nigerian government's corruption during the postgame press conference. Jamie toasts Sam for his courage, and the two reconcile.
14	4	"Carol of the Bells"	Declan Lowney	Joe Kelly	August 13, 2021
On Christmas Day, Ted unsuccessfully tries to spend time over the phone with Henry and Michelle; becoming dejected, he starts drinking and watching It's a Wonderful Life. Suspecting Ted would feel alone on his first post-divorce Christmas, Rebecca brings him along to give gifts to underprivileged children around the town. Roy and Keeley learn Phoebe's classmate is bullying her for "rancid" breath; they find a dentist at home who traces the problem to an antihistamine she takes for a cat allergy. They take Phoebe to confront her bully using handwritten posters. Higgins and his family host an open house for players who are unable to visit their families at home, and nearly the whole team shows up, bearing food. As the party ends, Ted and Rebecca – joined by a street band they gave money to earlier – sing "Christmas (Baby Please Come Home)" to the team outside the Higgins' house.
15	5	"Rainbow"	Erica Dunton	Bill Wrubel	August 20, 2021
Nate timidly tries and fails to book a prime table at his parents' favorite restaurant for their anniversary. After Rebecca and Keeley teach him to be more assertive and confident, he successfully obtains a window table. Rebecca becomes interested in her new match on Bantr, an anonymous dating app co-owned by Keeley and now Richmond's sponsor. Richmond continues to struggle, in part due to team captain Isaac's anxiety hampering his leadership. Roy takes him and Ted to a field near his childhood home and has Isaac play a pickup match with neighborhood footballers, reminding him to have fun while playing. While commentating on his Soccer Saturday show, Roy watches a newly enthusiastic Isaac on the pitch at Nelson Road and realizes how much he misses being involved with the game. He abruptly leaves the broadcast and makes his way to Richmond's stadium, where he joins Ted's coaching staff mid-game, to the applause of the Richmond supporters and the chagrin of Nate.
16	6	"The Signal"	Erica Dunton	Brett Goldstein	August 27, 2021
Rebecca's mother visits, having recently left her father. Rebecca tells Ted that her parents repeatedly separate and reconcile every few years. Beard and Jane get back together; Ted and Roy advise Higgins not to voice his misgivings. Richmond enjoys newfound success with Roy on the coaching staff, but Jamie is upset that Roy refuses to coach him. Roy eventually relents and tells Jamie he needs to play more aggressively "when appropriate" and that the coaches will give him a signal for when to do so. In a close game against Tottenham Hotspur in the quarter-final of the FA Cup, all four coaches give Jamie the signal – raising their middle fingers at him – leading to his scoring a goal to end the first half. As the second half becomes intense, Ted has a panic attack and leaves the pitch; with Richmond in disarray, the Spurs score, tying the game. Nate steps up and calls a triple substitution that leads to a game-winning score for Richmond. Sharon finds Ted in her office asking for help.
17	7	"Headspace"	Matt Lipsey	Phoebe Walsh	September 3, 2021
Ted's first two sessions with Sharon prove fruitless. He leaves the first almost immediately and storms out of the second after expressing skepticism and contempt towards psychotherapy because couples therapy failed to save his marriage. But during the third visit, Ted apologizes for his outburst and decides to commit to the therapy process. Nate sees himself going viral on Twitter and being dubbed the "Wonder Kid" in the media for the triple-substitution that resulted in Richmond's recent win, but his insecurity worsens when his stern father advises humility instead of praising his achievement. As a result, Nate begins behaving cruelly to others in the locker room – first to Colin, who used to bully him, and to Will, the new kit man. Roy begins spending every moment he can with Keeley, to the point where she feels smothered. A remark from Jamie helps Roy understand that Keeley needs space; he makes amends by running her a candlelit rose bath to enjoy on her own.
18	8	"Man City"	Matt Lipsey	Jamie Lee	September 10, 2021
Sharon suffers a concussion after being hit by a car while biking, and Ted brings her home from the hospital. Rebecca and Sam anonymously arrange a dinner date and find out they are each other's Bantr matches. Rebecca is apprehensive, but Sam convinces her to have dinner with him platonically, which they both enjoy. They kiss when they return to Rebecca's house but agree not to escalate the relationship further. Roy is called to Phoebe's school to take her home; she has repeatedly been reprimanded for bad language and he realizes his swearing is a poor influence on her. Richmond plays Manchester City at Wembley Stadium for the first time but suffers a harsh loss. After the game, Jamie's father bullies him over the loss in the locker room in front of his teammates and coaches. Jamie finally snaps and punches his father, whom Beard throws out. Roy embraces Jamie, who breaks down crying in his arms. A shaken Ted calls Sharon and reveals that his father died by suicide when Ted was 16. Rebecca and Sam ultimately spend the night together.
19	9	"Beard After Hours"	Sam Jones	Brett Goldstein & Joe Kelly	September 17, 2021
After Richmond's loss against Manchester City, a dispirited Beard is joined at Mae's pub by avid Richmond supporters Baz, Jeremy and Paul. The four later sneak into an exclusive club, but Beard is thrown out after tearing his trousers. Mary, a woman he met at the club, offers to mend them if he comes to her apartment. She gives him another pair to wear but he is forced to flee when her hulking boyfriend Darren returns. Lost, Beard is cornered and beaten in an alley by Jamie's father and his friends, but Darren saves him, having followed him to return his wallet and phone, where Beard finds 72 angry texts from Jane, which he tries to answer, but his phone dies. Baz, Jeremy and Paul take him home in a limo they acquired while gambling at the club, and in return Beard shows them a secret entrance to Nelson Road stadium. Unable to open his door after his key breaks, Beard stumbles into a secret nightclub beneath a church, where he finds Jane and they enjoy a night of dancing. The next morning, a sleep-deprived Beard returns to work as usual, with coffee for his fellow coaches, still wearing the sequined bell bottoms Mary gave him.
20	10	"No Weddings and a Funeral"	MJ Delaney	Jane Becker	September 24, 2021
Rebecca and Sam continue their relationship in secret for several weeks. One morning, Rebecca's mother informs her that her father has died. The entire Richmond team attends the funeral, but Ted has a panic attack at home and calls Sharon for a therapy session. Rupert and Bex come to the funeral uninvited with their newborn, angering Rebecca. Keeley and Sassy deduce that Rebecca is in a secret relationship, and Keeley correctly guesses it is with Sam. Rebecca tells her mother she does not want to eulogize her father, as she had seen him cheat on her mother as a child, but her mother says that she knew about the affairs, and loved him despite his flaws. At his apartment, Ted describes his father's death by suicide to Sharon for the first time, and arrives late for the funeral. Instead of giving a traditional eulogy, Rebecca leads the mourners in singing "Never Gonna Give You Up", a song that her parents liked and found meaningful. After the service, Jamie admits to Keeley that he loves her. Rupert tells Rebecca he will give her Bex's shares of Richmond and briefly converses with Nate. Rebecca ends her relationship with Sam, fearing heartbreak, but grows closer to her mother.
21	11	"Midnight Train to Royston"	MJ Delaney	Sasha Garron	October 1, 2021
Sam scores the first hat-trick of his career. Ghanaian billionaire Edwin Akufo visits Richmond and informs Rebecca that he wants to buy Sam's contract. Akufo elaborates to Sam that he wants to buy Raja Casablanca and sign an ensemble of Africa's most talented players; he gives Sam three days to consider the offer. Nate is frustrated because he believes he gets little credit for developing the team's tactics; while trying on new suits, he impulsively kisses Keeley. During Roy and Keeley's photoshoot for her magazine profile, Keeley admits Nate's kiss and Jamie's confession of love at the funeral, and Roy tells her he spent three hours helping Phoebe's teacher prepare for a school event, leaving both shaken. Ted learns that Sharon left her job a day earlier than expected, and he tracks her down to give her the team's parting gift. Later, Ted receives a text message from Trent Crimm tipping him off about a forthcoming article revealing Ted's match day panic attack, adding that Nate was his anonymous source.
22	12	"Inverting the Pyramid of Success"	Declan Lowney	Jason Sudeikis & Joe Kelly	October 8, 2021
Ted receives the club's full support after the news breaks of his panic attack. He focuses on the season's final match, which could determine Richmond's promotion back into the Premier League. At halftime, Nate tries to abandon his false 9 tactic, but the players elect to stick with it. Ted asks Nate why he is upset with him; Nate angrily responds that Ted has continuously neglected him since he joined the coaching staff. Jamie earns a penalty kick, but hands the ball to Dani, who scores an equalizing penalty to secure Richmond's promotion. The team and supporters celebrate, but Nate walks off the field and tears down Ted's "Believe" sign. To Akufo's fury, Sam decides to stay at Richmond, indirectly telling Rebecca it would be best for his own personal journey. Ted runs into Trent Crimm, who tells him he was fired for revealing his own anonymous source. Bantr's VC company offers to finance Keeley's own PR firm. She and Rebecca discover Rupert has bought West Ham United. Roy forgives Jamie and Nate for sharing their affections with Keeley but worries she will leave him. Two months later, Rupert greets the new head of his West Ham coaching staff: Nate.

=== Season 3 (2023) ===
No. overall	No. in season	Title	Directed by	Written by	Original release date
23	1	"Smells Like Mean Spirit"	MJ Delaney	Leann Bowen	March 15, 2023
Richmond is projected to finish in last place for the new Premier League season, while West Ham is expected to be in the top four. The forecast demoralizes the team; to lift their spirits, Ted has them tour London's sewer system, using it as a metaphor for letting their difficulties and mistakes flow away, instead of dwelling on them. Photos of the team entering the sewer go viral. Nate mocks the team and Ted during a press conference, but Ted responds during his own press conference with self-deprecating jokes that charm the reporters. Roy and Keeley inform Phoebe that they are breaking up, as Roy's coaching responsibilities and Keeley's new PR firm give them little time together, but Keeley suggests there are deeper problems in their relationship. Over the phone, Ted's son Henry shows him a toy that his mother's "friend" Jake bought him, unsettling Ted.
24	2	"(I Don't Want to Go to) Chelsea"	MJ Delaney	Sasha Garron	March 22, 2023
Trent Crimm begins visiting Richmond to write a book about the club; but Roy, still bitter over a scathing article Trent wrote about his debut at age 17 for Chelsea, forbids the players to talk to him. Roy and Trent eventually reconcile at Ted's urging. Keeley, struggling to lead her PR firm, hires her inexperienced model friend Shandy, which frustrates her CFO Barbara. Meanwhile Zava, a brilliant, eccentric footballer, has quit Juventus FC. When Rebecca learns Rupert wants to sign him, she confronts Zava in the men's room during Richmond's Chelsea match and harshly tells him that joining a top club like West Ham would not be an opportunity to show his greatness. At the press conference that follows, instead of signing with Chelsea, Zava announces he will sign with Richmond. Roy reminisces to Ted and Trent about his career with Chelsea, realizing he had never allowed himself simply to enjoy playing the sport as a youth.
25	3	"4–5–1"	Destiny Ekaragha	Bill Wrubel	March 29, 2023
Richmond enjoys an unprecedented five-game winning streak with Zava on the team, culminating in a win away at Old Trafford against Manchester United. Sam takes the team to celebrate at his yet-to-open Nigerian restaurant, Ola's. Ted is disturbed to learn that his ex-wife Michelle is dating their former couples therapist, Dr. Jacob; both Sharon and Sassy validate his concern that it is an ethical violation. Jamie feels overshadowed by Zava's stardom; Roy offers to give him extra training sessions. Rebecca visits her mother's psychic Tish, who tells her, among other things, that she will become a mother. Rebecca angrily rebuffs Tish as a fraud, but is later stunned when odd things occur in line with two of Tish's premonitions. Colin introduces his boyfriend Michael to the team as just a friend, but Trent, while leaving the restaurant, spots them kissing in private.
26	4	"Big Week"	Destiny Ekaragha	Brett Goldstein	April 5, 2023
After they spend the night together, Ted asks Sassy out on "an actual date," but she declines, telling him that he, like herself, is a "mess" and that they are better off remaining friends with benefits. Richmond prepares for their much-anticipated match against West Ham, with Ted and Nate not having seen each other since Nate's acrimonious departure from Richmond. Nate privately regrets the way he left, but Rupert tells him to quash his concerns. Keeley meets Jack, the woman running the VC company that invested in her PR firm. Trent uncovers camera footage of Nate tearing Ted's "Believe" sign in half, which Beard and Roy show the team at halftime to rile them up. Richmond's furiously aggressive play in the second half of the match results in three red card penalties and ultimately a heavy loss. Rebecca notices Rupert flirting with his assistant after the match and tells him to cut it out. Ted calls Michelle to voice his concerns about her relationship with Dr. Jacob.
27	5	"Signs"	Matt Lipsey	Jamie Lee	April 12, 2023
Richmond suffers a seven-game winless streak since their loss to West Ham. Rebecca visits her gynecologist after another of Tish's premonitions comes true but learns that she is no longer fertile. Ted learns his son got in trouble for bullying another student but is reassured when Henry shows remorse. Keeley fires Shandy after her antics lead to the firm losing a client. Keeley and Jack grow closer, get drunk and have sex in the office after hours. Nate takes a famous model on a date to A Taste of Athens, his favorite restaurant, but she disdains the restaurant and leaves. Nate later bonds with waitress Jade. Zava fails to show for the Manchester City game; the team play without him and ultimately lose. After the game they learn Zava has announced his retirement. Ted suggests to them that Zava's departure will encourage them to regain their belief in themselves.
28	6	"Sunflowers"	Matt Lipsey	Story by : Joe Kelly & Jason Sudeikis; Teleplay by : Brendan Hunt	April 19, 2023
After losing a friendly against AFC Ajax in Amsterdam, Ted declares no curfew in order to lift the team's spirits. Keeley and Jack fly to Norway to see the aurora borealis. Higgins and Will go to a jazz club in the red light district. Roy pushes Jamie into training; after tiring Roy out by leading him on a running tour of the city, Jamie teaches him to ride a bicycle. Rebecca is accidentally knocked off a bridge into a canal, but a man who lives on a houseboat rescues her, and she spends the night there. Colin heads out to a gay bar where Trent finds him and relates his own struggles with coming out. The rest of the team argue about where to go that night and end up staying at the hotel to have a pillow fight. Coach Beard prepares drugged tea for himself and Ted, and they head out separately. Ted tours the Van Gogh Museum, then has supper at an American-style restaurant where the movements of players in an old Chicago Bulls basketball game on the wall inspire him to create a new strategy inadvertently based on Total Football. The next morning they all leave Amsterdam weary but in high spirits.
29	7	"The Strings That Bind Us"	Matt Lipsey	Phoebe Walsh	April 26, 2023
Ted, Beard, and Roy begin to introduce Total Football to the team with a series of unusual training exercises. Attempting the strategy in a game against Arsenal F.C., they fall behind 3–0 in the first half, but after a pep talk from Jamie they come together to score an elegant goal in the second half, convincing Trent that Ted's supportive style of coaching will succeed. Nate works up the courage to ask Jade on a date, which she accepts. Rebecca expresses concern that Jack is love-bombing Keeley with extravagant gifts, and so Keeley tells Jack she wants their relationship to be on more equal terms. Just before his father is to visit, Sam criticizes a bigoted Cabinet minister on Twitter, and the next day he finds that the minister's supporters have vandalized his restaurant. When he brings his father to see the wreckage, he finds the whole team there, cleaning, painting, and repairing the restaurant.
30	8	"We'll Never Have Paris"	Erica Dunton	Keeley Hazell & Dylan Marron	May 3, 2023
Solid application of Total Football helps Richmond to four wins in a row. But when Michelle, Henry and Dr. Jacob visit Ted in London, he is unsettled to learn Michelle is going to Paris with Dr. Jacob, whom he suspects wants to propose to her. He asks Rebecca's help in investigating the matter, but Rebecca convinces him to let it go and enjoy the time he gets to spend with Henry. When Ted, Beard and Henry attend a West Ham game, Nate is privately pleased to see them. Keeley is horrified to discover that a sexually explicit video of her has leaked online. Jack, hoping to preserve her own reputation among her wealthy friend circle, has lawyers draft an apology for Keeley to read on-air, but Keeley refuses, prompting an argument with Jack which ends their relationship. Jamie then visits Keeley and apologizes for failing to delete the email containing her leaked video, which she sent him while they dated; the two share a hug. Isaac discovers Colin is gay when the team agrees to erase all explicit photos of ex-partners. Michelle returns from Paris, and Ted notices she is not wearing a ring.
31	9	"La Locker Room Aux Folles"	Erica Dunton	Chuck Hayward	May 10, 2023
Isaac is left troubled after finding out Colin is gay, and it strains the friendship between the two men. After a poor showing by Richmond in the first half of a match against Brighton, a Richmond fan uses "the other F-word" to insult the team, causing Isaac to attack the fan and receive a red card as punishment, though the fan is also ejected. In the locker room Colin comes out to the rest of the team, and they agree to support him. Richmond wins the match, and Colin posts a season-best performance. Nate introduces Jade to Rupert, who invites him for a "guys' night out" after the West Ham game. But after he realizes that Rupert has asked two women to join them, Nate makes an excuse, leaves and shows up at Jade's. Isaac later visits Colin at his home to reveal he was troubled that Colin hadn't previously come out to him. Colin explains that he was scared of even the tiny chance Isaac might reject him, and Isaac admits that he would not have been able to keep it a secret anyway. Colin invites Isaac inside, and the two bond again as friends over some games of FIFA.
32	10	"International Break"	Matt Lipsey	Jane Becker	May 17, 2023
Nate abruptly quits West Ham and recuperates at his parents' house, where he mends his strained relationship with his father. Several Richmond players are selected to play for their World Cup national teams. Sam is disappointed not to be selected for Nigeria, only to learn Edwin Akufo bribed officials to keep him off the team out of spite. Rupert recruits Rebecca to join Akufo's exclusive Super League, but Rebecca berates Akufo and the other team owners for taking football away from working-class people out of greed. She sways them into rejecting Akufo's plan, after which he throws food all over the meeting room and storms out. An impressed Rupert tries to kiss Rebecca afterwards. She rejects him and realizes she has overcome her resentment towards him. Keeley learns that Jack's VC company has pulled funding for her firm, but Rebecca invests in the firm to keep it running. Roy apologizes to Keeley for ending their relationship, and they sleep together. The next morning, Richmond kitman Will finds the locker room in perfect order when he arrives, along with a note from Nate apologizing for his past behavior.
33	11	"Mom City"	Declan Lowney	Story by : Brendan Hunt & Jason Sudeikis; Teleplay by : Joe Kelly	May 24, 2023
Ted's mother Dottie unexpectedly arrives in London, making Ted anxious. Nate begins working at A Taste of Athens. Will, Colin and Isaac ask him to return to Richmond, but he turns them down. The team plays against Manchester City once again. Jamie suffers crippling anxiety over returning to his hometown, expecting his father to be at the game; he brings Roy and Keeley to his mother's house where she comforts him. At the game, Ted suggests to Jamie that he forgive his father for his own sake, which helps Jamie regain the confidence to seal a victory for Richmond. Jamie's father watches the game from his rehab facility and cheers him on. Ted later convinces Beard, the only holdout against Nate's return, to reconsider. Beard visits Nate and reveals how Ted helped him when he was at his lowest point; he forgives Nate and asks him to come back to work at the club. Ted admits to Dottie he resented her for glossing over her grief after his father's death, and the two reconcile.
34	12	"So Long, Farewell"	Declan Lowney	Brendan Hunt & Joe Kelly & Jason Sudeikis	May 31, 2023
Richmond can win the Premier League if they defeat West Ham, and Manchester City lose or draw their final game. News hits that Bex is divorcing Rupert over his infidelities, and he may lose his team because of sexual improprieties. Ted informs Rebecca that he and Coach Beard will be going home, and Rebecca considers selling the club. Nate becomes assistant kit man under Will and later apologizes to Ted. Trent gives Ted and Beard manuscript copies of his book to critique. West Ham take the lead in the first half of the game against Richmond. At half time the Richmond players reveal they all have pieces of the "Believe" sign that Nate tore up, and they reassemble it before returning to the pitch. When Richmond tie the score, Rupert assaults the West Ham manager to jeers from the fans. Richmond use one of Nate's original plays, and Sam scores the winning goal. Richmond finish second in the league because Manchester City won their game. Rebecca sells 49 percent of the team to the fans. She goes to the airport to bid Ted farewell; as she leaves, she helps a child who stumbled in front of her and recognizes the girl's father, a Dutch airline pilot, as the man from the Amsterdam houseboat. Beard stays in England and marries Jane. Roy becomes Richmond's head coach and starts sessions with Dr. Sharon, who is now on the team staff. Keeley gives Rebecca a proposal for an AFC Richmond Women's Team. Ted asks Trent to change the title of his book from The Lasso Way to The Richmond Way. Beard, Roy and Nate put the "Believe" sign back up in the locker room. Ted returns home and coaches his son's soccer team.

=== Season 4 (2026) ===
No. overall	No. in season	Title	Directed by	Written by	Original release date
35	1	"Home"	Declan Lowney	Joe Kelly	August 5, 2026
A few years after leaving AFC Richmond, Ted lives in Kansas City, co-parents his son with Michelle, and is an assistant manager at a local grocery store. He is surprised by a visit from Rebecca, Keeley and Higgins, who offer him the head coaching job for Richmond's women's team, which Rebecca and Higgins are secretly having financial troubles with. During the visit, Rebecca discovers a fondness for Kansas City barbecue but ruins all of her outfits with the sauce, forcing her to buy an overly bedazzled outfit from a local boutique. Higgins visits the Negro League Baseball Museum and is inspired by the career of Satchel Paige. Keeley's belief in the women's team is further inspired by a visit to a Kansas City Current game. After Rebecca, Keeley and Higgins board their flight back to London, Ted returns home and reflects on his time at Richmond. It is revealed that Roy won the FA Cup as manager of AFC Richmond, Jamie has left the team, and Trent Crimm is writing for a newspaper again. Despite initial doubts, Ted, Michelle and Henry agree to move to London.
36	2	"Curiouser and Curiouser!"	MJ Delaney	Leann Bowen	August 12, 2026
Ted finds that the women's team lacks support from Richmond fans and the press. The new assistant coach, Alice Chilton, is upset at being rejected for the role of head coach for the women's team, and is further irritated by Ted's personality. When the team's lead striker suffers a season-ending injury during training and Alice accompanies her to the hospital, Ted discovers that Alice suffered a similar injury that ended her playing career and steered her toward coaching. Despite initially quitting, Alice rejoins the team on after Ted's encouragement. Higgins and Rebecca discover a bleak outlook on the long term viability of the women's team, and withhold this from Keeley. Keeley improves the women's facilities by renovating a new locker room with the help of Roy. Beard, still coaching the Richmond men's team, is allowed to leave by Roy in order to rejoin Ted.
37	3	"Richmond's Got Talent"	MJ Delaney	Sasha Garron	August 19, 2026
When the Lady Greyhounds lose their other striker to pregnancy, Ted, Alice and Beard decide to hold open tryouts. The tryouts produce a number of enthusiastic candidates, including Dani Rojas's sister Maria, who is poor at football. Eventually, they choose Lizzie, a talented single mother, and Ted's acquaintance Shannon, who struggles to compete. Rebecca struggles to find balance between running the club and making time for her new boyfriend Matthijs. During a shareholders' meeting, Keeley learns about Higgins' viability report. Rebecca negotiates with a sponsor who is reluctant to sponsor the women's team, and Roy commissions Phoebe and her friends to create team uniforms after a delivery issue. Alice and Ted speak with Alice's former teammate Gemma, who reveals that she left football because of Alice's harshness. Ted convinces Gemma to join after revealing Alice's confidence in her. In a lacklustre opening match, Gemma scores the game winning goal.
38	4	"Greyhounds' Day Off"	Ellie Heydon	Sarah Walker	August 26, 2026
Ted, Beard and Alice try to disband cliques in the locker room. When a squabble breaks out in the locker room, Ted decides to cancel training and enlist all the players in a pub quiz. Keeley encourages Rebecca to meet with Zelda Southport, a financier for multiple women's football clubs, although Rebecca is hesitant. Roy states his desire to reunite with Keeley, with Keeley agreeing on the condition that Roy goes on ten dates with different women. Roy tries to speedrun the dates and ends up making out with a bartender until he injures his knee, leading him to become smitten with a doctor and his sister's colleague, Erin Beaumont. The pub quiz creates team chemistry when a group of men accuse Gemma of cheating, leading to a pub brawl that lands the whole team in jail. Zelda arranges the team's release in time for Higgins to arrive and announce that the team will play Chelsea in the upcoming Women's FA Cup.
39	5	"Riches of Embarrassment"	Ellie Heydon	Phoebe Walsh	September 2, 2026
After Ted is spotted eating alone, the team come to his support and question his personal life. During practice, Ted and Beard notice Alice's negative attitude, prompting the players to confront her. Beard and Ted watch Jane's play together, leading Beard to an unsatisfying encounter with Jane, and Ted to an interesting conversation with the stage manager. When Rebecca questions Matthijs' sudden move to London, he decides to pause their relationship. In the match against Chelsea, the Lady Greyhounds see a lacklustre attendance and go 2–0 down. At half time, Ted rallies up the team despite Alice's harshness, and Rebecca drunkenly rants at Richmond fans to show up for the women's team. Though Richmond manage to tie in the second half, a deflection off Niamh in the last minute grants Chelsea the lead–and the victory. Keeley, believing her marketing has failed, discovers Roy is beginning a steady relationship, leaving her heartbroken. After their match, Ted requests Alice to take time to reflect on her harsh approach and suspends her for the team's last match.
40	6	"Don't Jump Around Much Anymore"	Declan Lowney	Dylan Marron	September 9, 2026
On New Year's Eve, Ted spends time with Henry and Michelle at the Crown & Anchor; Rebecca, Keeley, and Roy attend an event where Jamie Tartt is promoting a new vodka; and the Lady Greyhounds, Leslie, and Beard, attend Zelda's party. When Michelle questions Ted's dating life, the pair end up discussing and healing old wounds around their divorce, leading Ted to agree to ask someone out on a date. Alice, still suspended, reluctantly joins the party with the Lady Greyhounds and has a tender moment with Gemma and the team. Beard is rejected by a younger woman named Claudine at the party, leading him to have a crisis about his age. While dancing, Roy aggravates his knee and is hospitalized. Keeley meets Erin and leaves heartbroken; while under strong painkillers, Roy mistakes Erin for Keeley and tells her he loves her. After no contact since their last fight, Matthijs shows up at midnight to surprise Rebecca. The Lady Greyhounds, barred from the pub, celebrate the New Year with a pickup football game out on the green, where Ted and Alice join them. However, Alice is humiliated to discover that Gemma shared her insecurities with the rest of the team and leaves early. Ted returns home and finds a new "Believe" poster crafted by Michelle.
41	7	"Yes & Baby"	Erica Dunton	Jane Becker & Bill Wrubel	September 16, 2026
Alice returns to Richmond for the first time since the suspension and (on the advice of a podcaster) resolves to "say yes" more often. This has mixed results, but when Ted and Beard suggest the "yes and" mantra of improvisational comedy, she has better success inspiring the team's confidence while still using her own voice. After Roy and Dani Rojas's greedy agent threatens their possible departure from Richmond to improve their contracts, Zelda lends Rebecca and Leslie her help, leading Rebecca to hire her. Erin makes her final checkup on Roy's knee, and decides to break up with him as she knows he is still in love with Keeley; the two part on warm and amicable terms. Ted seeks Keeley's help setting up a dating profile, but he ends up deleting the app and attempting to ask out the stage manager he met at Jane's play.
42	8	"Follow the Anger"	Erica Dunton	Jamie Lee & Brett Goldstein	September 23, 2026
The Lady Greyhounds are in contention for promotion after several wins, but in the late stages of a victory, Gemma injures her knee. She decides to concentrate on law school and accepts the internship, disheartening Alice. After comforting her, Ted tells the team that there is crying in football, and that they should express their feelings. Alice confronts Gemma at her home and urges her not to abandon football, as it is so central to her. The entire team, as well as Rebecca, come to support Gemma at the hospital as she gets the MRI to determine the extent of the injury. Roy asks dating tips from Ted for Keeley as they prepare for a ceremony (where Roy is being inducted into the Chelsea F.C. Hall of Fame), and Ted tells him to "wait for the right moment". The pair arrive late due to a number of comic mishaps, though Roy confesses his love to Keeley nonetheless, rekindling their relationship. Leslie discovers sudden sales of AFC Richmond shares and decides to investigate, concluding that Rupert is attempting to take the team back from Rebecca.
43	9	"Mae Rides the Bus"	Matt Lipsey	Jack Burditt & Julia Lindon	September 30, 2026
Following a narrow defeat against Southampton, Richmond must win their next match in order to guarantee their chances of entering the Super League. Mae is invited to attend the away game, and rides the Richmond team bus to Ashton Gate, giving the team a motivational speech before their deciding match against Bristol City. Although the Lady Greyhounds concede two goals in the first half, they manage to turn the tide, and Shannon seals Richmond's promotion in her debut for the club. However, Mae suffers a heart attack and dies after the match. Meanwhile, Keeley discovers that she is pregnant with Roy's child after a fainting spell at the match against Southampton; though she is elated, she is concerned with what Roy will think, but he is overjoyed to hear the news. The investigation into the sales of Richmond shares reveals that Zelda is responsible, and is working with her lackey Hugo to obtain a majority stake in the club.
44	10	"Being Alive"	Matt Lipsey	Brendan Hunt & Jason Sudeikis	October 7, 2026
The team mourns the loss of Mae at the Crown and Anchor. Henry leaves the wake and asks Ted about how his father died; Ted initially hides the truth but later reveals it. Nate returns to visit Richmond, and the "Diamond Dogs" reunite to offer advice to Roy regarding fatherhood, with Alice joining as the "Cat People". In their final game of the season, after earning promotion to the Women's Super League, the Lady Greyhounds play in front of a sell-out crowd at Nelson Road, including many of the players from the Richmond men's team. At Richmond's bi-annual shareholder meeting, Zelda reveals that she has bought out all of the other shareholders and now owns a significant portion of AFC Richmond, as part of a plan to challenge the patriarchy and gain social access to other male club owners in the Premier League. However, through various machinations on Rebecca and Higgins' side, Hugo Riddles' defection, and the execution of Mae's last will and testament, Rebecca manages to maintain her majority stake and full control over the club. She forgives Zelda and allows her to keep her stake in Richmond, deciding it is better to keep her enemies closer instead of allowing them to run free. Mae has also left the pub to Baz, Jeremy and Paul in her will. Roy accepts an offer to become the manager at Chelsea, and Rebecca proposes to Matthijs (which he accepts). To spend more time with Henry, Ted steps down to take on the assistant manager position of the Richmond women's team, promoting Alice in his place.

== Production ==
=== Development ===
Jason Sudeikis originally portrayed the title character in 2013 as part of a series of television commercials for NBC Sports promoting their coverage of the Premier League, in which Lasso is depicted as the new head coach of Tottenham Hotspur F.C.

In about 2015, Sudeikis's then-girlfriend Olivia Wilde suggested that he revisit the character, perhaps in a story in which Lasso found his career direction change. Whereas the original Lasso was more broadly comic and, as Sudeikis described him, "belligerent", he decided to make Lasso more sympathetic for the television series, explaining his reason for doing so in a May 2023 interview with The Guardian:

It was the culture we were living in. I'm not terribly active online and it even affected me. Then you have Donald Trump coming down the escalator. I was like, "OK, this is silly," and then what he unlocked in people ... I hated how people weren't listening to one another. Things became very binary and I don't think that's the way the world works. And, as a new parent – we had our son Otis in 2014 – it was like, "Boy, I don't want to add to this." Yeah, I just didn't want to portray it.

The series was commissioned in October 2019 by Apple TV+, with Sudeikis reprising the role. Television producer and Scrubs creator Bill Lawrence was brought in to work on a television series based around the character in 2017. The series is co-owned by Warner Bros. Television, where Lawrence's production company Doozer is based, and which controls linear distribution rights to the series, and NBC subsidiary Universal Television, which is a "passive partner".

On August 19, 2020, Apple TV+ renewed the series for a 10-episode second season. It was later confirmed that the second season had been expanded to 12 episodes. On October 28, 2020, the series was renewed for a third season. On an episode of the Scrubs rewatch podcast Fake Doctors, Real Friends with Zach + Donald, Lawrence indicated that Ted Lasso would likely be a "three-season show" due to Sudeikis's limited availability beyond the third season, and that the story had a planned resolution within those three seasons. In June 2022, Brett Goldstein also commented that the series would end after three seasons—"We are writing it like that." In March 2023, Sudeikis said that the third season "is the end of this story that we wanted to tell", and that there are possibilities for spin-offs. In an interview published in August 2023, Declan Lowney, who directed multiple episodes of the series, reiterated that the third season was "the end for now" and that it would be "two or three years [from filming the season] before anything happens — if anything happens".

In October 2021, Apple TV+ reached a licensing deal with the Premier League worth as much as £500,000 (around $682,000) for the series to feature the league's logos, kits, and trophy starting from the third season. On March 6, 2022, a day before filming for season 3 began, Nike, Inc. posted on its official Twitter account a photo of its trademark Swoosh logo incorporated onto an AFC Richmond kit, implying that the show's production had reached a deal with the company to act as the fictional club's "official" kit manufacturer on future episodes.

Some sources have noted the many similarities between the character of Ted Lasso and Terry Smith, an American football head coach who became the first American to be the manager/head coach of a professional English soccer club. AppleMagazine.com (which is not affiliated with Apple Inc.) writes that the series "was actually inspired by the story of Terry Smith, an American gridiron football coach who took over the English association football team Chester City and subsequently installed himself as the first-team coach".

In June 2024, Warner Bros. Television CEO Channing Dungey talked about the possibility of Ted Lasso returning for a fourth season. In August 2024, cast members Hannah Waddingham, Brett Goldstein, and Jeremy Swift signed contracts for a possible fourth season. In March 2025, the series was officially greenlit for a fourth season and that it was in the early stages of production. Juno Temple and Brendan Hunt were later confirmed to be returning as well.

=== Writing ===
Actors in the series Brett Goldstein and Brendan Hunt also joined the writing team along with Sudeikis as the second and third members of the main cast to do so. While Hunt and Sudeikis were part of both the cast and writing team from the start, Goldstein was initially a writer and story editor. It was only after a video audition of some Roy Kent scenes was sent to the showrunner, Bill Lawrence, that Goldstein was added to the cast.

The episodes "Carol of the Bells" and "Beard After Hours" were developed when the second season was expanded by two episodes, fitting in to the continuity of the second season without affecting storylines of the previously written episodes.

In March 2025, Sudeikis said that scripts for a fourth season were being written and that "Ted's coaching a women's team."

=== Casting ===
Theo Park is the series casting director. Nick Mohammed, who portrays Nate Shelley, originally auditioned for the role of Leslie Higgins, which in the end went to Jeremy Swift. Park pushed for Phil Dunster to play the role of Jamie Tartt, even though the character was originally to be from Latin America and portrayed by Cristo Fernández. The character Sam Obisanya was originally going to have been of Ghanaian heritage, but the character was changed after Toheeb Jimoh's casting. In March 2021, Sarah Niles was cast as Dr. Sharon Fieldstone, a sports psychologist for AFC Richmond in a main capacity for the second season. About Niles' casting, Park said that "It was really important with that role that [Niles] had a real sense of security and almost completely unflappable." Kiki May portrayed Nora, Sassy's teenaged daughter, in a recurring capacity during the second season. Casting for season three was set to begin near the end of 2021. Jodi Balfour was cast as Jack, a venture capitalist, in a recurring capacity for the third season in April 2022.

New cast members for the fourth season include Tanya Reynolds, Jude Mack, Faye Marsay, Rex Hayes, Aisling Sharkey, Abbie Hern and Grant Feely, who plays Ted's son, Henry, taking over the role from Gus Turner.

=== Filming ===
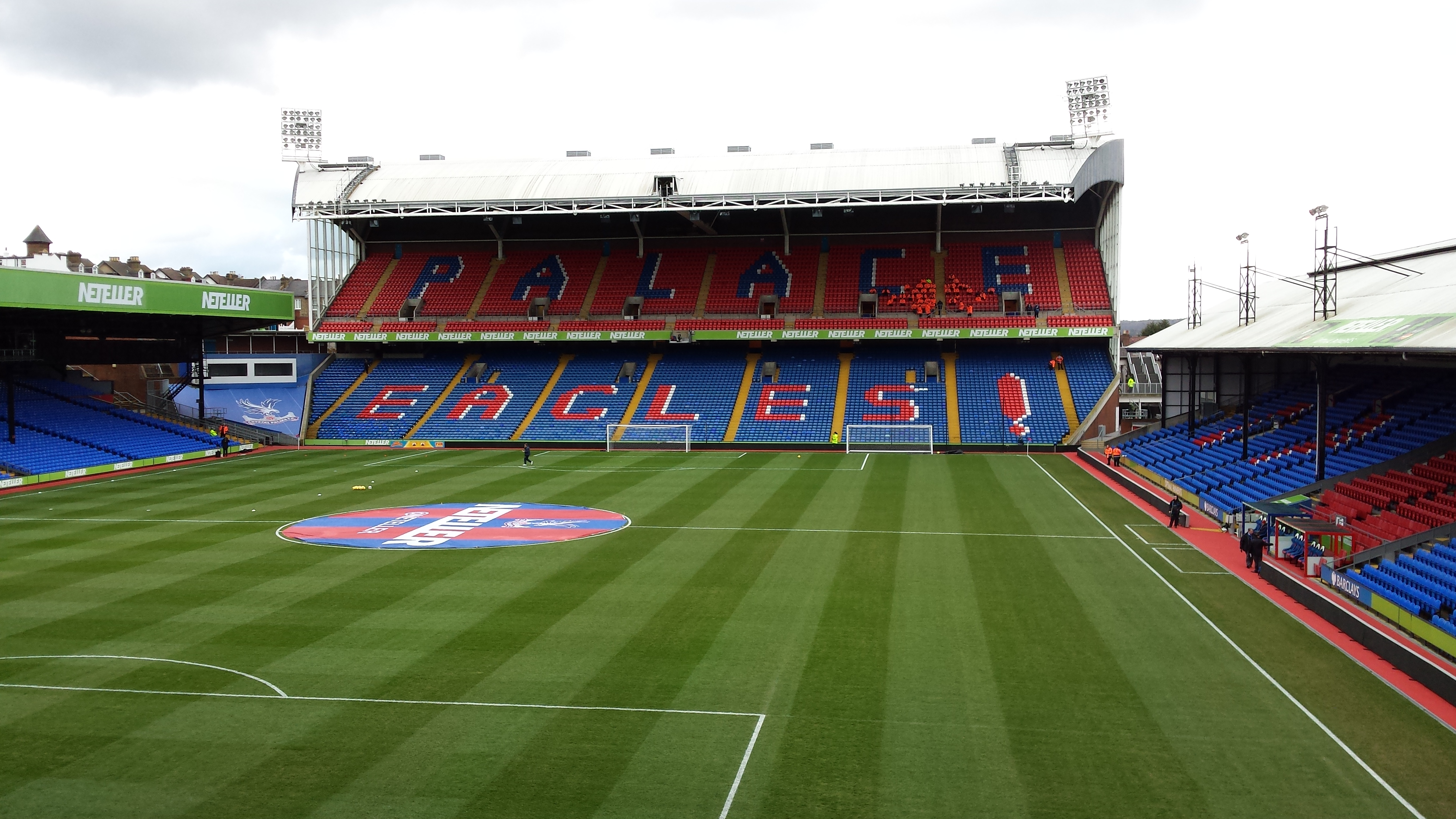
Crystal Palace's stadium Selhurst Park was used as AFC Richmond's Nelson Road.

Production began on the second season in January 2021. In March 2021, Jason Sudeikis and Hannah Waddingham were spotted filming outside a pub in London. Filming wrapped for the second season on June 4, 2021. Filming for the third season was set to take place between January and June 2022. Most of the pub and street scenes have been shot in the actual London Borough of Richmond. AFC Richmond's training field and complex in which Rebecca's office is based is filmed at the SkyEX Community Stadium which is the home ground of Hayes & Yeading United F.C. who are a semi-professional club playing in England's seventh level of competitive football, whereas Nelson Road, the home stadium of Richmond, is actually Selhurst Park, a real-life Premier League stadium used by London club Crystal Palace F.C. Exterior shots of Craven Cottage, the home stadium of Fulham F.C. were used in season 1 to pass off as fellow Premier League ground Goodison Park when AFC Richmond played away at Everton. Wembley Stadium was used in season 2 to portray the FA Cup semi-final with Manchester City.

The show incorporates many real-life members of the British football and television entertainment community. This also includes using a number of genuine television shows which feature the actual presenters, sets and theme songs, including the Sky Sports programme Soccer Saturday. The daytime ITV show This Morning also features in season 2.

For the second season, assistant director Sophie Worger hired former professional player Kasali Casal to manage the football choreography. Casal enlisted a team of former professional players to play for the opposition teams facing AFC Richmond during game scenes, these included former Premier League and England internationals Lee Hendrie and Jay Bothroyd, as well as former Liverpool player Jermaine Pennant and Wolverhampton Wanderers defender George Elokobi.

Filming for the third season began on March 7, 2022. The series filmed on location in Amsterdam for the third season. With the emergence of Nate becoming West Ham United's head coach during season 3, the club's London Stadium was used for filming. Stamford Bridge, the home of Chelsea, was used for filming in the third season episode "4–5–1". The appearance sparked controversy amongst Chelsea supporters after the show's editing team modified a memorial banner for the late Chelsea player Ray Wilkins that was paid for by the club's supporters. The banner which reads "They don't make them like Ray anymore" was changed to read "Roy" to tie in with the storyline of Richmond coach Roy Kent returning to his old club. Owner Todd Boehly released a statement apologizing to fans and to Wilkins' family, claiming the deal with Apple was agreed before he had purchased the club.

During the third season, further Premier League stadiums including Manchester United's Old Trafford and Burnley's Turf Moor were briefly filmed for on-field action, while Dutch Eredivisie side AFC Ajax's Johan Cruyff Arena was used for on and off the field scenes at the beginning of the episode "Sunflowers". Later episodes in Season 3 also filmed at Arsenal's Emirates Stadium and Manchester City's City of Manchester Stadium.

Production on season four began in July 2025, with some filming locations being scouted in Blue Springs, Missouri and other locations in the Kansas City metropolitan area. Filming began on July 21, with a photo of the main cast seated at Gates, a Kansas City barbecue restaurant. Other locations included scenes filmed at CPKC Stadium during a Kansas City Current match, the Negro Leagues Baseball Museum, and Country Club Plaza. Filming shifted back to London later in summer 2025.

=== Merchandising ===
In March 2021, Bill Lawrence revealed that official Ted Lasso merchandise would be for sale ahead of the season two premiere. The merchandise, including football jerseys, became available in June 2021.

In 2023, to coincide with the release of season 3, Nike released a full range of AFC Richmond merchandise including jerseys, hoodies, tracksuits, and practice shirts.

== Release ==
The first season of 10 episodes premiered on Apple TV+ on August 14, 2020. The first three episodes were released at once, followed by weekly installments of the remaining seven. A second season of 12 episodes premiered July 23, 2021.

In October 2020, it was renewed for a third season of 12 episodes, which premiered March 15, 2023.

In March 2025, it was announced that the series was renewed for a fourth season, which was set to premiere in summer 2026. In April 2026, it was announced the fourth season would premiere on August 5, 2026.

== Reception ==
=== Critical response ===
Critical response of Ted Lasso
Season	Rotten Tomatoes	Metacritic
1	92% (74 reviews)	71 (21 reviews)
2	98% (125 reviews)	85 (35 reviews)
3	80% (209 reviews)	73 (31 reviews)
4	90% (159 reviews)	62 (30 reviews)

==== Season 1 ====
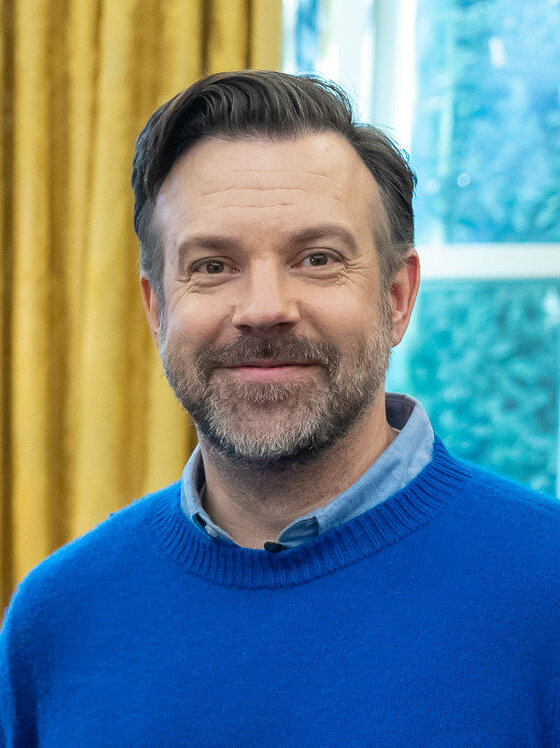
Jason Sudeikis' performance as Ted Lasso has been widely praised by critics.

Review aggregator Rotten Tomatoes reported an approval rating of 92% based on 74 reviews, with an average rating of 8.3/10. The website's critics consensus reads, "Warm and winsome, if not particularly hilarious, Ted Lasso fleshes out its promo premise with unrelenting optimism and a charming turn from Jason Sudeikis." Metacritic gave the first season a weighted average score of 71 out of 100 based on 21 reviews.

Kristen Baldwin of Entertainment Weekly gave the series an A− and wrote, "There's nothing groundbreaking about the way Ted Lasso's story beats play out, but the show—a mix of workplace antics, sentimental sports inspo, and soapy romance—is undeniably winning." Reviewing the series for Rolling Stone, Alan Sepinwall described the series as "extremely likable throughout, but it's more a hypothetical comedy than an actual one. There are long stretches where Juno Temple is the only actor even trying to sell what few jokes are in the scripts." and gave a rating of three out of five. Writing for The Guardian, Benjamin Lee gave it two out of five, describing it as "a show that isn't unwatchably bad but isn't really much of anything", and suggesting that some of its humor was "rooted in some questionable and uneasy stereotypes".

As the season went on, critical appreciation increased. After the eighth episode, Caroline Framke of Variety published a review with the headline "For Your Reconsideration: Ted Lasso". She went on to say, "Above all odds, Ted Lasso chipped away at my skepticism until there was none left—just like the character himself does to everyone he meets", adding, "At a time when just about everything feels catastrophic, there's something undeniably satisfying about spending some time with good people who are just trying to be the best they can, on and off the field." Keri Lumm of Paste said, after the airing of the penultimate episode, "Ted Lasso is the wholesome American hero we need", going on to say "... the landscape of television has felt kind of gloomy, so imagine my surprise when I turned on the TV to Ted Lasso and felt a swelling of a now unfamiliar emotion—hope". And after the finale aired, Lea Palmieri from Decider said: "Every step of the way, Ted Lasso proves to be comforting and entertaining and somehow both a distraction and a reminder that kindness is out there, not just on this fictional show, not just across the pond, but deep in the heart of America too."

==== Season 2 ====
The second season was met with critical acclaim. Rotten Tomatoes reported an approval rating of 98% based on 125 reviews, with an average rating of 8.7/10. The website's critics consensus reads, "As comforting as a buttery biscuit from a friend, Ted Lasso's sophomore season is a feel-good triumph that plays into the show's strengths while giving its supporting team more time on the pitch." Metacritic gave the second season a weighted average score of 85 out of 100 based on 35 reviews.

==== Season 3 ====
On Rotten Tomatoes, the season has an approval rating of 81% based on 207 reviews, with an average rating of 7.45/10. The website's critics consensus reads, "Ted Lasso's third and possibly final season takes time to find its footing, but patient viewers who believe will find that they appreciate Coach as much as ever." Metacritic gave the third season a weighted average score of 73 out of 100 based on 31 reviews.

Reception for the third season became progressively more mixed as it went on, with reviewers criticizing the extended episode runtimes, pacing, and characterization. A joint review published in Vulture described the third season as "bumbling", "tedious" and "discombobulated" compared to the first two, noting "a last-gap [sic] quality to these episodes and a hastiness to the storytelling that makes the show's internal world feel inexplicably small." The reviewers noted a decline across the season's various character arcs, which were said to "range from merely muddled to downright inexplicable", with particular criticism directed at Keeley and Nate's subplots. David Sims of The Atlantic felt the series had "devolv[ed] into ham-fisted, novelistic nonsense" in its pivot from its sitcom roots to a "prestige drama" in the third season. Sims lamented the hourlong episode runtimes, which he described as "a pure example of the excesses that can flourish on streaming television", and characterized the season overall as unfocused and lacking in conflict. Like Sims, Linda Holmes of NPR identified the season's separation of the cast as its primary weakness, suggesting that the series should "refocus on relationships" rather than give each character their own storyline. Jack King of GQ conversely felt the series had "markedly improved" in the third season, but found Sudeikis's "saccharine" lead character to be the "least interesting" part of the series.

==== Season 4 ====
On Rotten Tomatoes, the season has an approval rating of 90% based on 159, reviews, with an average rating of 7.2/10. The website's critics consensus reads, "Ted Lasso marks its anticipated return with a fourth season that is equal parts recycled and refreshing, proving that the tried and true formula can still withstand new challenges thrown its way." Metacritic gave the season a weighted average score of 62 out of 100 based on 30 reviews.

=== Awards and nominations ===
The first season received 20 nominations at the 73rd Primetime Emmy Awards, becoming the most nominated freshman comedy in Emmy Award history at that time. It won 7 awards, including Outstanding Comedy Series and acting awards for Jason Sudeikis, Brett Goldstein and Hannah Waddingham; while Brendan Hunt, Nick Mohammed, Jeremy Swift and Juno Temple received nominations. Sudeikis also won the Golden Globe Award for Best Actor – Television Series Musical or Comedy and the Screen Actors Guild Award for Outstanding Performance by a Male Actor in a Comedy Series for 2020 and 2021.

The series won in the categories for Outstanding New Program, Outstanding Achievement in Comedy and Program of the Year at the 37th TCA Awards and also won for best Comedy Series and New Series at the 73rd Writers Guild of America Awards.

The second season received 20 nominations at the 74th Primetime Emmy Awards. It won four awards, including Outstanding Comedy Series, acting awards for Sudeikis and Goldstein, and a directing award for MJ Delaney. Several actors received nominations, including Toheeb Jimoh, Mohammed, Temple, Waddingham, Sarah Niles, James Lance, Sam Richardson and Harriet Walter.

The third season received 21 nominations at the 75th Primetime Emmy Awards. It was nominated for Outstanding Comedy Series, Sudeikis for Outstanding Lead Actor in a Comedy Series, Phil Dunster and Goldstein for Outstanding Supporting Actor in a Comedy Series, Temple and Waddingham for Outstanding Supporting Actress in a Comedy Series, Becky Ann Baker, Sarah Niles and Harriet Walter for Outstanding Guest Actress in a Comedy Series, and the finale episode was nominated for both outstanding writing and directing. At the 75th Primetime Creative Arts Emmy Awards, Sam Richardson won for Outstanding Guest Actor in a Comedy Series.

Following the debut of the third season, the cast of Ted Lasso were invited by US President Joe Biden and First Lady Jill Biden to the White House to promote mental health and well-being, a theme that was featured in storylines during the second and third seasons of the show.

=== Audience viewership ===
Ted Lasso became the most watched television series on Apple TV+. The first-season premiere episode became Apple TV+'s most watched premiere and it ranked 89th overall among other television series or shows measured across streaming platforms from November 1, 2019, to July 18, 2021. According to TV analytics provider TVision, Ted Lasso has been viewed by panel members 8.4 times as much as the average Apple TV+ original series or shows TVision has measured since Apple TV+ launched in November 2019.

Over the second-season premiere weekend, Apple TV+ expanded its number of new viewers by 50% week over week. Apple also announced the second season of Ted Lasso "increased its viewership by six times over season one". In 2021, the final episode of the second season ranked ninth place among all SVOD programs and fifth place in the SVOD originals category with 507 million minutes (MM) viewed.

The fourth season premiere received 296.6 million minutes viewed on its release date which was the biggest launch for an Apple TV series.

== Other media ==
In December 2021, Apple TV+ released Ted Lasso: The Missing Christmas Mustache, a four-minute claymation special.

In September 2022, it was announced that AFC Richmond and Nelson Road would appear in the video game FIFA 23. The team would be available in multiple online and offline modes, with players also able to select Ted Lasso to manage any team in the game, as well as have someone else manage the team.

Ted Lasso: The Richmond Way, a box-set containing seasons 1–3, was released on Blu-ray and DVD on July 30, 2024. The same set was also released on 4K Blu-ray on December 2, 2025.
