= Leann Bowen =

American comedy writer

- Born: Leann Radmila Tamori Bowen; Los Angeles, California, U.S.
- Occupations: Writer; producer; actress
- Years active: 2008–present
- Known for: Ted Lasso, I Love You, America

Leann Bowen is an American television writer. She is best known as a writer and co-executive producer for the sports comedy-drama series Ted Lasso, which won two Primetime Emmy Award for Outstanding Comedy Series.

== Early life and education ==
Bowen was born in the Los Angeles area, and grew up in the San Fernando Valley. She is the daughter of the late Bobby Lee Bowen, who was a member of the Black Panther Party; and Lillian Tamoria, whose family hails from Cavite, a province in the Philippines. Her parents split up when she was young. Bowen was raised by her mother and maternal grandparents, who instilled in her a strong work ethic.

== Career ==
Bowen fine-tuned her writing and performing skills while working in improv and sketch comedy in the Los Angeles area.

== Selected credits ==
=== Television ===
==== Writing ====
Year(s)	Series	Network	Notes
2020-2021	Ted Lasso	Apple TV+	Two episodes
2019-2021	Dear White People	Netflix	Five episodes
2018	I Love You, America	Hulu	Two episodes

== Awards and nominations ==
Year	Television	Category	Status
2021	Ted Lasso	Outstanding Comedy Series	Won
2022	Ted Lasso	Outstanding Comedy Series	Won
2023	Ted Lasso	Outstanding Comedy Series	Nominated

- Shared PGA Award, Outstanding Producer of Episodic Television, Comedy for Ted Lasso (2022)
- NAACP Image Award nomination, Outstanding Writing in a Comedy Series for Ted Lasso (2022)
- Shared WGA Award nomination, Comedy Series for Ted Lasso (2022)
- Shared two WGA Awards for Ted Lasso (2021)
- Shared WGA Award nomination, Comedy/Variety Sketch Series for I Love You, America (2019)
