= Bronson Webb =

British actor (born 1983)

- Born: Bronson John Webb; 20 February 1983 (age 43); London, England
- Occupation: Actor
- Years active: 1994–present

Bronson John Webb (born 20 February 1983) is a British actor.

== Career ==
Webb has had supporting roles in Harry Potter and the Prisoner of Azkaban (2004), The Dark Knight (2008) from the Batman franchise, Robin Hood (2010), and Pirates of the Caribbean: On Stranger Tides (2011). In roles with more visibility, he has played Emilio, a kidnapper in The Lives of the Saints (2006), and Tony the sidekick in Pusher (2012). Webb also plays Will, a central character in "Winter Is Coming", the first episode of HBO's Game of Thrones.

== Selected filmography ==
=== Film ===
Year	Title	Role	Notes
2002	Out of Control	Charlie-boy	
2002	Pure	Tom	
2004	Harry Potter and the Prisoner of Azkaban	Pike	
2005	Kingdom of Heaven	Apprentice	
2006	The Lives of the Saints	Emilio	
2006	Venus	Jessie's Boyfriend	
2007	Atonement	Beach Soldier	
2008	The Dark Knight	Bounty Hunter	
2008	Rocknrolla	Paul	
2008	Cass	The Assassin	
2008	Eden Lake	Reece	
2008	The Disappeared	Gang Leader	
2009	Dead Man Running	Smudger	
2010	Robin Hood	Jimoen	
2011	Pirates of the Caribbean: On Stranger Tides	Cook	
2012	Payback Season	Brooksy	
2012	Pusher	Tony	
2013	Still Life	Morgue Attendant	
2015	Kill Your Friends	Hasting	
2015	Pan	Steps	
2015	Victor Frankenstein	Rafferty	
2016	Rogue One	Rebel MP	
2018	Kill Ben Lyk	Nervous Ben Lyk	
2018	Holmes & Watson	Jonathan Nightingale	
2021	Rise of the Footsoldier: Origins	Kevin Whitaker	
2022	The Batman	Hooded Gunman	
TBA	As Deep as the Grave	TBA	Post-production

=== Television ===
Year	Title	Role	Notes
1995	Porkpie	Kid	Episode: "Why Me?"
1999	The Bill	Various	4 episodes
2003	Waking the Dead	Teenage Tanner	2 episodes
2005	Fingersmith	John Vroom	3 episodes
2010	The Tudors	Forager	Episode: "As It Should Be"
2011	Game of Thrones	Will	Episode: "Winter Is Coming"
2012	Lewis	Silas Whittaker	Episode: "Fearful Symmetry"
2015	Cuffs	Reece Gutridge	2 episodes
2016	Endeavour	Bernie Waters	Episode: "Coda"
2016	The Aliens	Guy	6 episodes
2017	Count Arthur Strong	Bobby	Episode: "Arthur the Hat"
2017	Strike	Evan Duffield	3 episodes
2017	Motherland	Luke	Episode: "The Cavalry"
2020–2023	Ted Lasso	Jeremy	7 episodes

== Awards and nominations ==
Year	Association	Category	Project	Result	Ref.
2023	Screen Actors Guild Awards	Outstanding Performance by an Ensemble in a Comedy Series	Ted Lasso	Nominated	
