= Christopher Orr (film critic) =

American film critic and magazine editor (born 1967)

- Born: 1967 (age 58–59); United States
- Occupations: Film critic, journalist

Christopher Orr (born 1967) is an American film critic and journalist. He was a senior editor at The Atlantic from 2010 to 2019. In 2022, he became signature voices editor of the opinion section at The New York Times.

Orr has also written for The New Republic, Salon, LA Weekly, and The New York Sun.

== Bibliography ==
- "Thor and the Hulk walk into a bar". The Culture File. Film. The Atlantic. 321 (2): 35–37. Mar 2018.
