= So Long, Farewell (Ted Lasso) =

- Ted Lasso episode
- Episode no.: Season 3 Episode 12
- Directed by: Declan Lowney
- Written by: Brendan Hunt; Jason Sudeikis; Joe Kelly
- Cinematography by: Vanessa Whyte
- Editing by: Melissa McCoy
- Original release date: May 31, 2023
- Running time: 75 minutes

Guest appearances
- Sarah Niles as Dr. Sharon Fieldstone; Andrea Anders as Michelle Keller; Annette Badland as Mae; Adam Colborne as Baz; Bronson Webb as Jeremy; Kevin Garry as Paul; Ellie Taylor as Flo "Sassy" Collins; Katy Wix as Barbara; Edyta Budnik as Jade; Kieran O'Brien as James Tartt; Bill Fellows as George Cartrick; Mike O'Gorman as Jacob Brianson; Patrick Baladi as John; Harriet Walter as Deborah Welton

Episode chronology
← Previous "Mom City"	Next → "Home"

"So Long, Farewell" is the twelfth episode and season finale of the third season of the American sports comedy-drama television series Ted Lasso, based on the character played by Jason Sudeikis in a series of promos for NBC Sports' coverage of England's Premier League. It is the 34th overall episode of the series and was written by series co-creators Brendan Hunt, Jason Sudeikis, and Joe Kelly, and directed by Declan Lowney. It was released on Apple TV+ on May 31, 2023.

The series follows Ted Lasso, an American college football coach who is unexpectedly recruited to coach a fictional English Premier League soccer team, AFC Richmond, despite having no experience coaching soccer. The team's owner, Rebecca Welton, hires Lasso hoping he will fail as a means of exacting revenge on the team's previous owner, Rupert, her unfaithful ex-husband. The previous season saw Rebecca work with Ted in saving it, which culminated with their promotion to the Premier League, while the current season saw the club's efforts in winning the Premier League. In the episode, AFC Richmond prepares to face West Ham, with the result deciding if Richmond will win the League, while Ted prepares to leave England. Sudeikis said that the episode was "the end of this story that we wanted to tell", although Apple TV+ did not officially describe the episode as a series finale.

The episode received generally positive reviews from critics, who praised the closure to Ted's arc, performances and emotional tone, but criticizing the pacing, writing and under-developed stories, with some feeling that the episode was not enough to compensate for an uneven season.

== Plot ==
AFC Richmond can win the Premier League on the final day of the season, as long as Manchester City lose or draw in their match. Richmond will face West Ham United, just as Rupert (Anthony Head) has become involved in a scandal, with Bex planning to divorce him over his "inappropriate relationship" with his former assistant Ms. Kakes.

Higgins (Jeremy Swift) informs Rebecca (Hannah Waddingham) that the club value is at an all-time high and suggests she sells 49% of her shares, which will leave her with majority ownership. However, Rebecca is thinking of selling the club entirely, since she feels she has nothing to prove now. She remarks that she took over ownership of the club only to ruin Rupert's life, but he seems to be doing a pretty good job of it himself. Roy (Brett Goldstein) feels that Jamie (Phil Dunster) is trying to resume his relationship with Keeley (Juno Temple) and asks him to step aside. Jamie refuses and reveals that her explicit video was made for him, which angers Roy. After fighting each other, they visit Keeley to make her choose between them. Insulted by their sexism, she chooses neither and kicks them out. They realize their mistake and leave to get some food.

Ted (Jason Sudeikis) and Beard (Brendan Hunt) announce they will return home at the end of the season. At the end of their last practice before the match against West Ham, the team surprise Ted and Beard by performing "So Long, Farewell". Trent (James Lance) gives Ted and Beard a draft of his book, The Lasso Way, for feedback. Nate (Nick Mohammed) is back as assistant kit man, and is jokingly fined by the club for his season-long absence. Finally ready to talk with Ted about his departure, Rebecca reveals she is selling the club, explaining "if you go, I go". She begs him to stay, but he maintains his position. In the locker room, Nate tearfully apologizes to Ted, after noting that the "Believe" sign is no longer in the room.

The first half of the final match of the season ends with West Ham leading 2–0, while Manchester City is leading over Liverpool. At halftime, the Richmond players reveal they have kept the pieces of the ripped "Believe" sign, (Note: Which was ripped apart at the end of "Signs".) and reassemble them. During the second half, Jamie scores a goal, and later wins a penalty kick. Jamie offers the kick to Dani, who instead gives the penalty to Isaac (Kola Bokinni). Despite never having made a successful penalty kick before, Isaac ties the score by blasting right through the net into the stands.

Rupert furiously reprimands West Ham's manager, George Cartrick (Bill Fellows), (Note: AFC Richmond's previous coach who was fired by Rebecca and replaced with Ted in "Pilot".) telling him to take out Jamie by injuring him. When George refuses, Rupert assaults him. This prompts the crowd to jeer Rupert, and he leaves the stadium in disgrace. In the final minute, Richmond wins a free kick. Using a strategy developed by Nate, Sam (Toheeb Jimoh) scores the winning goal. Because Manchester City wins their match, Richmond finishes second overall, but Ted still receives widespread praise for the achievement.

At the airport, Ted says goodbye to Rebecca, who has chosen to sell 49% of Richmond to the fans while maintaining ownership. Before the plane takes off, Beard explains that he wants to stay in England to be with Jane, and the two share an emotional farewell before Beard fakes an appendicitis attack to get off the plane. As she leaves the airport, Rebecca runs into the stranger she met in Amsterdam (Matteo van der Grijn) (Note: The owner of the houseboat in "Sunflowers".) with his daughter, and both smile at their surprise reunion.

Trent finds his draft with extensive notes from Beard. Ted's note says he loved it but suggests changing the title, saying "It's not about me. It never was"; so Trent changes it to The Richmond Way. Rupert is removed as owner of West Ham and is ostracized by the media. Roy becomes the new manager of Richmond. Sam is selected to play for the Nigeria national football team. Jamie reconnects with his father (Kieran O'Brien) and remains friends with Keeley and Roy. Keeley and Barbara (Katy Wix) reopen their PR firm and propose a Richmond women's team, which Rebecca gleefully agrees to. Sharon (Sarah Niles) is hired as Richmond's Head of Mental Health, and Roy takes sessions with her. Nate glues the pieces of the "Believe" sign back together, and he, Roy, and Beard place the re-assembled "Believe" sign back in the locker room. Beard marries a now-pregnant Jane in a pagan ritual at Stonehenge, with the members of Richmond in attendance. Ted, now coach of Henry's soccer team, reminds his son to "be a goldfish", after missing a goal. As Henry goes back to play, Ted smiles, content.

== Development ==
=== Production ===
The episode was directed by Declan Lowney and written by co-creators Brendan Hunt, Jason Sudeikis and Joe Kelly. This was Lowney's eighth directing credit, Hunt's eighth writing credit, Sudeikis' eighth writing credit, and Kelly's tenth writing credit.

=== Writing ===
Jason Sudeikis has said that the episode and the season mark "the end of this story that we wanted to tell, that we were hoping to tell, that we loved to tell."

=== Music ===
In October 2021, Ed Sheeran announced that he would write a song for the season. The song was announced and released on the day of the episode as a tie-in, titled "A Beautiful Game".

== Reception ==
=== Critical response ===
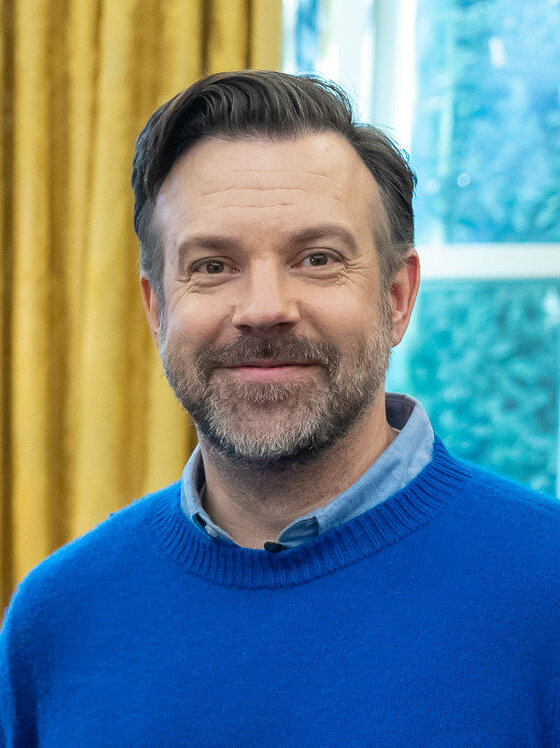
Jason Sudeikis' performance in the episode received praise, while the writing as a whole received a more mixed response.

"So Long, Farewell" received generally positive reviews from critics. The review aggregator website Rotten Tomatoes reported a 75% approval rating for the episode, based on 16 reviews, with an average rating of 7/10. The website's critics consensus reads: "Ted Lasso's last hurrah is a steady (if somewhat uneventful) conclusion that asks viewers one final time to believe."

Manuel Betancourt of The A.V. Club gave the episode a "B" and wrote, "I'd rather stay with the final image of the show: Ted staring at us in close-up, content with coaching his kid with the same enthusiasm and equanimity he brought to AFC Richmond: Be a goldfish. I may have struggled with this final season (a lot) but there remains something quite endearing about this simple dictum being leveraged within a sports comedy about men struggling to be better versions of themselves for themselves but also for each other. That's why it was never the Ted Lasso Way: It was always, as Trent admits in changing his title, the AFC Richmond Way." Rick Porter of The Hollywood Reporter wrote, "Ted Lasso spread itself thin in places this season, particularly as it regards Keeley and Nate. The finale, however, hit enough right notes to leave viewers with the warm feelings that it's trafficked in all along." Brian Lowry of CNN wrote, "All told, it was a very good and touching finish to a not-so-great season. And if it happened to be a trifle predictable, that still worked, mostly because it was hard to imagine Ted Lasso achieving its goals any other way."

Alan Sepinwall of Rolling Stone wrote, "Despite the many odd choices of what to show and what to elide, 'So Long, Farewell' trended more toward [the good version of the show] than the one on display for most of Season Three. [...] For the most part, it was the most emotionally satisfying chapter of a very weird, often hugely frustrating season. But the ambiguity about the future of the show also sapped some power from the episode." Stephen Rodrick of Variety wrote, "It was cocaine and booze that led the Gallaghers into gross indulgence. For AFC Richmond, it was a lack of discipline. In the end, Ted Lasso needed a better coach."

Keith Phipps of Vulture gave the episode a 3-star rating out of 5 and wrote, "It's a happy ending to a series that, at its best, took seriously what it meant to pursue happiness while showing kindness to others. Ted Lasso had its ups and downs, particularly in this third season, which essentially laid out Ted's fate in its opening moments then drew out the path toward that fate over a dozen episodes and took some characters along some truly peculiar sidetracks across some unusually long runtimes. But Ted Lasso will almost certainly be remembered for its best qualities, an unusual gift for heartwarming moments that felt earned rather than forced, and a central character defined as much by his willingness to admit his flaws as his infectious enthusiasm. Good effort. Nice hustle." Paul Dailly of TV Fanatic gave the episode a 4-star rating out of 5 and wrote, "'So Long, Farewell' marked the end of Ted Lasso in its current form, and it featured closure for all of the characters we've grown to love throughout the show's three-season run. There were tears, laughs, and moments of satisfaction, but there were also moments that didn't work as well as the creatives intended." Linda Holmes of NPR wrote, "Ted Lasso had a bit of a bumpy third season, and its final episode didn't undo all of those bumps. Nevertheless, the show pulled off some very nice moments that doubtless reminded viewers why they fell in love with it in the first place."

Christopher Orr of The New York Times wrote, "And so it ends, after three seasons of uplift and heartbreak, corner kicks and penalties, crummy dads and supportive moms, goofy aphorisms and movie references. But mostly uplift." Fletcher Peters of The Daily Beast wrote, "Ted Lasso Season 3 had its ups and many, many downs, but it definitely doesn't feel like the end. Ending on a milquetoast swan song for Ted would be going against his own words: It's never been about him. It's always been about Richmond. Let's crack open the rest of the team and see what stories are left to tell."

Meghan O'Keefe of Decider wrote, "The good news is the Ted Lasso Season 3 finale largely stuck its landing, offering the tender mix of comedy and catharsis that made the show a smash hit. The bad news is it might not be enough to pull a woefully uneven season of television together." Andrew Webster of The Verge wrote, "Despite an ending that seems ripped out of a rom-com, Ted Lasso is ultimately about friendship and the things that we can learn from other people. In that way, the finale was perfectly fitting: it shows how painful it can be when these relationships change but how necessary that change is for all of us. You just have to, you know, believe."

=== Accolades ===
"So Long, Farewell" was chosen by Sudeikis to support his Primetime Emmy Award nomination for Outstanding Lead Actor in a Comedy Series.

Award	Category	Recipient(s)	Result	Ref.
ACE Eddie Awards	Best Edited Single-Camera Comedy Series	Melissa McCoy	Nominated	
Astra TV Awards	Best Directing in a Streaming Comedy Series	Declan Lowney	Nominated	
Cinema Audio Society Awards	Outstanding Achievement in Sound Mixing for Television Series – One Hour	David Lascelles, Ryan Kennedy, Sean Byrne, and Jordan McClain	Nominated	
Directors Guild of America Awards	Outstanding Directorial Achievement in Comedy Series	Declan Lowney	Nominated	
Golden Reel Awards	Outstanding Achievement in Sound Editing – Broadcast Long Form Dialogue / ADR	Brent Findley, Bernard Weiser, Bruce Hond, Scott Haller, and Daniel Douglass	Nominated	
Hollywood Music in Media Awards	Best Song – Onscreen Performance – TV Show/Limited Series	"So Long, Farewell" (Written by Oscar Hammerstein; Performed by cast)	Nominated	
Primetime Emmy Awards	Outstanding Directing for a Comedy Series	Declan Lowney	Nominated	
Primetime Emmy Awards	Outstanding Writing for a Comedy Series	Brendan Hunt, Joe Kelly, and Jason Sudeikis	Nominated	
Primetime Creative Arts Emmy Awards	Outstanding Contemporary Hairstyling	Nicky Austin, Nikki Springall, Sophie Roberts, and Nicola Pope	Nominated	
Primetime Creative Arts Emmy Awards	Outstanding Guest Actress in a Comedy Series	Harriet Walter	Nominated	
Primetime Creative Arts Emmy Awards	Outstanding Music Supervision	Tony Von Pervieux and Christa Miller	Nominated	
Primetime Creative Arts Emmy Awards	Outstanding Original Music and Lyrics	"A Beautiful Game" (Ed Sheeran, Foy Vance, and Max Martin)	Won	
Primetime Creative Arts Emmy Awards	Outstanding Picture Editing for a Single-Camera Comedy Series	Melissa McCoy and Francesca Castro	Nominated	
