= International Break (Ted Lasso) =

- Ted Lasso episode
- Episode no.: Season 3 Episode 10
- Directed by: Matt Lipsey
- Written by: Jane Becker
- Cinematography by: David Rom
- Editing by: Melissa McCoy
- Original release date: May 17, 2023
- Running time: 63 minutes

Guest appearances
- Sam Richardson as Edwin Akufo; Annette Badland as Mae; Katy Wix as Barbara; Edyta Budnik as Jade; Ruth Bradley as Ms. Bowen; Jimmy Conrad as unnamed scout

Episode chronology
← Previous "La Locker Room Aux Folles"	Next → "Mom City"

"International Break" is the tenth episode of the third season of the American sports comedy-drama television series Ted Lasso, based on the character played by Jason Sudeikis in a series of promos for NBC Sports' coverage of England's Premier League. It is the 32nd overall episode of the series and was written by executive producer Jane Becker, and directed by supervising producer Matt Lipsey. It was released on Apple TV+ on May 17, 2023.

The series follows Ted Lasso, an American college football coach who is unexpectedly recruited to coach a fictional English Premier League soccer team, AFC Richmond, despite having no experience coaching soccer. The team's owner, Rebecca Welton, hires Lasso hoping he will fail as a means of exacting revenge on the team's previous owner, Rupert, her unfaithful ex-husband. The previous season saw Rebecca work with Ted in saving it, which culminated with their promotion to the Premier League. In the episode, Edwin Akufo returns to form his own Super League, while Keeley and Nate face challenges.

The episode received mixed reviews from critics, who praised the performances, but criticized the runtime, disjointed storylines and Nate's subplot. For the episode, Sam Richardson won Outstanding Guest Actor in a Comedy Series at the 75th Primetime Creative Arts Emmy Awards.

== Plot ==
AFC Richmond is coming off a 10-game winning streak, with Sam (Toheeb Jimoh) singled out as a key player. Soccer Saturday also reveals that Nate (Nick Mohammed) has unexpectedly parted ways with West Ham United, with pundits wondering if the club's success should be attributed to him or Rupert (Anthony Head). A later conversation with Jade (Edyta Budnik) reveals that Nate chose to quit the club.

With an international break approaching, several of the Richmond players are called to represent their countries: Jamie (Phil Dunster) makes his debut for the England national football team, Dani (Cristo Fernández) is called for the Mexico national football team, Bumbercatch for the Switzerland national football team, Colin (Billy Harris) for the Wales national football team, and Thierry Zoreaux/"Van Damme" (Moe Jeudy-Lamour) for the Canada national soccer team. Sam is disappointed that he was not selected for the Nigeria national football team, but his spirits are lifted when he sees Jamie wearing his number while playing for England. Meanwhile, Rebecca (Hannah Waddingham) is informed that Edwin Akufo (Sam Richardson) is visiting to form a new Super League that is to consist of top players and clubs.

Keeley (Juno Temple) arrives at KJPR and finds that the furniture is being taken away and the employees are leaving. Barbara (Katy Wix) tells her that Jack's board decided to pull funding for the company, shutting down the firm within two days. Rupert visits Rebecca at her office and invites her to attend Akufo's Super League meeting, which she accepts. Sam arrives at Ola's and finds Akufo there. As petty retribution for Sam's turning down his previous offer to join Raja CA, Akufo booked the entire restaurant and then cancelled each reservation. He reveals that he bribed the Nigerian government with $20 million to keep Sam off Nigeria's national team.

Roy's (Brett Goldstein) niece Phoebe gives him a garish tie-dyed shirt she made for him. Despite the startled and sometimes mocking reactions of the staff, Roy chooses to wear it. The next day Phoebe's teacher, Ms. Bowen (Ruth Bradley), tells him that his attitude seems much "lighter". Rebecca attends Akufo's meeting with several other team owners. Akufo reveals he intends his League to sign all the best clubs in Europe and charge higher prices for tickets. Rebecca berates them for taking football away from working-class people just to make more money that they don't need and refuses to join. This prompts the other owners to reject Akufo's plan, resulting in an off-screen tantrum from Akufo that leaves the guests covered in food. After everyone leaves, Rupert tries to kiss Rebecca, but she politely rebuffs him.

A dejected Nate visits his parents' house and sleeps there while Jade travels to Poland for a few days. After spending his time in bed for several days, Nate finds his old violin and plays it again. He then talks with his father, mending their strained relationship. Roy visits Keeley at her house and apologizes, admitting that their break-up was his fault. Rebecca visits Keeley, learns about the VC's pullout from KJPR, and offers funding she can easily afford to keep the firm going. Roy walks in wearing a robe, revealing that he and Keeley are back together.

At the Richmond locker room, Will discovers that his daily chores are already done, along with a lavender-scented note saying, "I'm sorry - Wonder Kid". Barbara tells Keeley that she has resigned from Jack's company and wants to continue working for KJPR. Roy wears another tie-dyed shirt to work. Rebecca tells Ted (Jason Sudeikis) that she no longer cares about beating Rupert but still wants to win the whole thing for Richmond.

== Development ==
=== Production ===
The episode was directed by supervising producer Matt Lipsey and written by executive producer Jane Becker. This was Lipsey's sixth directing credit, and Becker's third writing credit.

== Critical reviews ==
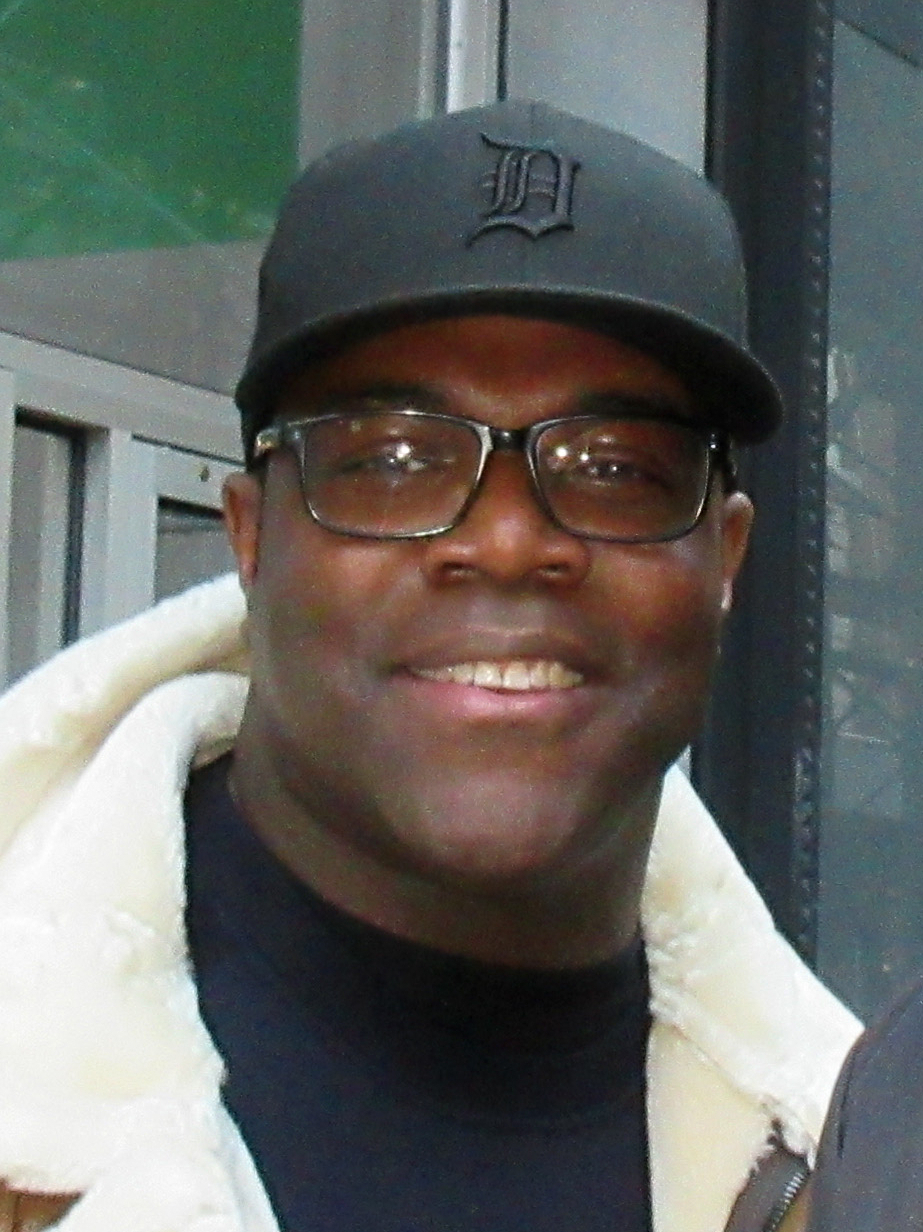
For the episode, Sam Richardson won Outstanding Guest Actor in a Comedy Series at the 75th Primetime Creative Arts Emmy Awards.

"International Break" received mixed reviews from critics. The review aggregator website Rotten Tomatoes reported a 60% approval rating for the episode, based on five reviews.

Manuel Betancourt of The A.V. Club gave the episode a "C" and wrote, "The question is obviously rhetorical as Ted Lasso has yet to meet a thorny plot it cannot neatly solve within an episode's time. And so, yes, Nate does eventually get out of bed at his parents' place, and Keeley, swallowing her pride, allows Rebecca to help her out, and both seem, by episode's end, to have found their footing once again. Their crises of confidence are shown to be mere speed bumps that maybe (finally?) will get them folded back into the fabric of the show with more finesse than we've seen this entire season." Rick Porter of The Hollywood Reporter wrote, "The show has pulled focus away from Ted and the club successfully in the past, but 'International Break' felt somewhat disjointed."

Keith Phipps of Vulture gave the episode a 3 star rating out of 5 and wrote, "As others have noted, Nate's been on a weird journey this year. Where the second season carefully set up his heel turn one rude moment at a time, this one has whisked him out of the darkness before he even really spent much time there. This episode seems, in some respects, to dramatize Nate's long overdue realization that he's gone astray, but it might have had more impact if we didn't already get the sunny, likable Nate back several episodes ago." Paul Dailly of TV Fanatic gave the episode a 4.25 star rating out of 5 and wrote, "One of my biggest complaints about Ted Lasso Season 3 has been that many of the storylines aren't moving toward the finish line. We still don't know whether this is truly the end, but thankfully, 'International Break' finally felt like we were nearing the end of a chapter."

Christopher Orr of The New York Times wrote, "I know I'm quite down on this episode, and I know that many readers will like it more than I did. Which is fine! The world don't move to the beat of just one drum. But to be clear, especially for new readers: My disappointment is not because I dislike the show or any such nonsense. It's because I like it enough to hold it to a high standard." Fletcher Peters of The Daily Beast wrote, "Seeing as Ted Lasso has gone back and undone almost every plot line it's established this season, it wouldn't shock me if Sudeikis returns after something like a three-episode hiatus in Season 4. It would be refreshing to see folks like Roy and Rebecca become the co-leads of the show. But Ted Lasso has fallen into such cyclical storylines that it's hard to believe it can reinvent itself in the way fans would enjoy. Nevertheless, losing Sudeikis might be inevitable, so perhaps some evolution is necessary."

=== Accolades ===
Sam Richardson received a nomination for Outstanding Guest Actor in a Comedy Series at the 75th Primetime Creative Arts Emmy Awards. He would win the award, marking his first Emmy win.
