= Primetime Emmy Award for Outstanding Supporting Actress in a Comedy Series =

American television award

- Awarded for: Outstanding Supporting Actress in a Comedy Series
- Country: United States
- Presented by: Academy of Television Arts & Sciences
- First award: 1954
- Currently held by: Kate O'Flynn, Widow's Bay (2026)
- Website: emmys.com

This is a list of winners and nominees of the Primetime Emmy Award for Outstanding Supporting Actress in a Comedy Series. In early Primetime Emmy Award ceremonies, the supporting categories were not always genre-, or even gender-, specific. Beginning with 1970, supporting actresses in comedy have competed alone. However, these comedic performances often included actors from miniseries, telefilms, and guest performers competing against main cast competitors. Such instances are marked below:

- # – Indicates a performance in a Miniseries or Television film, prior to the category's creation
- § – Indicates a performance as a guest performer, prior to the category's creation

== Winners and nominations ==
=== 1950s ===
| Year | Actress | Role | Program | Network |
Best Series Supporting Actress
1954 (6th) (Note: Early Emmy ceremonies did not have genre-specific acting categories)
| 1954 (6th) | Vivian Vance | Ethel Mertz | I Love Lucy | CBS |
| 1954 (6th) | Bea Benaderet | Blanche Morton | The George Burns and Gracie Allen Show | CBS |
| 1954 (6th) | Ruth Gilbert | Various characters | The Milton Berle Show | NBC |
| 1954 (6th) | Marion Lorne | Mrs. Gurney | Mister Peepers | NBC |
| 1954 (6th) | Audrey Meadows | Alice Kramden | The Jackie Gleason Show | CBS |
Best Supporting Actress in a Regular Series
1955 (7th)
| 1955 (7th) | Audrey Meadows | Alice Kramden | The Jackie Gleason Show | CBS |
| 1955 (7th) | Bea Benaderet | Blanche Morton | The George Burns and Gracie Allen Show | CBS |
| 1955 (7th) | Jean Hagen | Margaret Williams | Make Room for Daddy | ABC |
| 1955 (7th) | Marion Lorne | Mrs. Gurney | Mister Peepers | NBC |
| 1955 (7th) | Vivian Vance | Ethel Mertz | I Love Lucy | CBS |
Best Actress in a Supporting Role
1956 (8th)
| 1956 (8th) | Nanette Fabray | Various characters | Caesar's Hour | NBC |
| 1956 (8th) | Natalie Schafer | Charmaine Schultz | The Bob Cummings Show | CBS |
| 1956 (8th) | Jean Hagen | Margaret Williams | Make Room for Daddy | ABC |
| 1956 (8th) | Audrey Meadows | Alice Kramden | The Honeymooners | CBS |
| 1956 (8th) | Thelma Ritter # | Aggie Hurley | Alcoa-Goodyear Playhouse | NBC |
Best Supporting Performance by an Actress
1957 (9th)
| 1957 (9th) | Pat Carroll | Various characters | Caesar's Hour | NBC |
| 1957 (9th) | Ann B. Davis | Charmaine Schultz | The Bob Cummings Show | CBS |
| 1957 (9th) | Audrey Meadows | Various characters | The Jackie Gleason Show | CBS |
| 1957 (9th) | Mildred Natwick # | Madame Arcati | Ford Star Jubilee | CBS |
| 1957 (9th) | Vivian Vance | Ethel Mertz | I Love Lucy | CBS |
Best Continuing Supporting Performance by an Actress in a Dramatic or Comedy Series
1958 (10th)
| 1958 (10th) | Ann B. Davis | Charmaine Schultz | The Bob Cummings Show | CBS & NBC |
| 1958 (10th) | Pat Carroll | Various characters | Caesar's Hour | NBC |
| 1958 (10th) | Verna Felton | Hilda Crocker | December Bride | CBS |
| 1958 (10th) | Marion Lorne | Myrtle Banford | Sally | NBC |
| 1958 (10th) | Vivian Vance | Ethel Mertz | I Love Lucy | |
Best Supporting Actress (Continuing Character) in a Comedy Series
1959 (11th)
| 1959 (11th) | Ann B. Davis | Charmaine Schultz | The Bob Cummings Show | NBC |
| 1959 (11th) | Rosemary DeCamp | Margaret MacDonald | The Bob Cummings Show | NBC |
| 1959 (11th) | Elinor Donahue | Betty | Father Knows Best | CBS & NBC |
| 1959 (11th) | Verna Felton | Hilda Crocker | December Bride | CBS |
| 1959 (11th) | Kathleen Nolan | Kate McCoy | The Real McCoys | ABC |
| 1959 (11th) | ZaSu Pitts | Susanna Pomeroy | Oh, Susanna | CBS |

=== 1960s ===
| Year | Actress | Role | Program | Network |
Outstanding Performance by an Actress in a Series (Lead or Support)
| 1960 (12th) | Jane Wyatt | Margaret Anderson | Father Knows Best | CBS |
| 1960 (12th) | Donna Reed | Donna Stone | The Donna Reed Show | ABC |
| 1960 (12th) | Teresa Wright | Margaret Bourke-White | NBC Sunday Showcase | NBC |
| 1960 (12th) | Loretta Young | Various characters | The Loretta Young Show | NBC |
Outstanding Performance in a Supporting Role by an Actor or Actress in a Series
1961 (13th)
| 1961 (13th) | Don Knotts | Barney Fife | The Andy Griffith Show | CBS |
| 1961 (13th) | Abby Dalton | Lt. Martha Hale | Hennesey | CBS |
| 1961 (13th) | Barbara Hale | Della Street | Perry Mason | CBS |
Outstanding Performance in a Supporting Role by an Actress
1962 (14th)
| 1962 (14th) | Pamela Brown # | Princess Victoria of Saxe-Coburg-Saalfeld | Hallmark Hall of Fame | NBC |
| 1962 (14th) | Jeanne Cooper § | Anna Medalle | Ben Casey | ABC |
| 1962 (14th) | Colleen Dewhurst # | Gertrude Hart | Focus | NBC |
| 1962 (14th) | Joan Hackett § | Ellen Parker | Ben Casey | ABC |
| 1962 (14th) | Mary Wickes | Maxfield | The Gertrude Berg Show | CBS |
1963 (15th)
| 1963 (15th) | Glenda Farrell § | Martha Morrison | Ben Casey | ABC |
| 1963 (15th) | Davey Davison § | Laura Hunter | The Eleventh Hour | NBC |
| 1963 (15th) | Nancy Malone | Libby Kingston | Naked City | ABC |
| 1963 (15th) | Rose Marie | Sally Rogers | The Dick Van Dyke Show | CBS |
| 1963 (15th) | Kate Reid # | Queen Victoria | Hallmark Hall of Fame | NBC |
1964 (16th)
| 1964 (16th) | Ruth White # | Shelagh Mangan | Hallmark Hall of Fame | NBC |
| 1964 (16th) | Martine Bartlett § | Miranda Ledoux Porter | Arrest and Trial | ABC |
| 1964 (16th) | Anjanette Comer § | Annabelle Selinsky | Arrest and Trial | ABC |
| 1964 (16th) | Rose Marie | Sally Rogers | The Dick Van Dyke Show | CBS |
| 1964 (16th) | Claudia McNeil § | Mrs. Hill | The Nurses | CBS |
Outstanding Individual Achievements in Entertainment - Actors and Performers
1965 (17th)
| 1965 (17th) | Leonard Bernstein | Conductor | New York Philharmonic Young People's Concerts with Leonard Bernstein | CBS |
| 1965 (17th) | Lynn Fontanne | Fanny Bowditch Holmes | Hallmark Hall of Fame: "The Magnificent Yankee" | NBC |
| 1965 (17th) | Alfred Lunt | Oliver Wendell Holmes | Hallmark Hall of Fame: "The Magnificent Yankee" | NBC |
| 1965 (17th) | Barbra Streisand | Herself | My Name Is Barbra | CBS |
| 1965 (17th) | Dick Van Dyke | Rob Petrie | The Dick Van Dyke Show | CBS |
| 1965 (17th) | Julie Andrews | Herself | The Andy Williams Show | NBC |
| 1965 (17th) | Johnny Carson | Himself | The Tonight Show Starring Johnny Carson | NBC |
| 1965 (17th) | Gladys Cooper | Margaret St. Clair | The Rogues | NBC |
| 1965 (17th) | Robert Coote | Timmy St. Clair | The Rogues | NBC |
| 1965 (17th) | Richard Crenna | James Slattery | Slattery's People | CBS |
| 1965 (17th) | Julie Harris | Florence Nightingale | Hallmark Hall of Fame: "The Holy Terror" | NBC |
| 1965 (17th) | Bob Hope | Himself | Chrysler Presents A Bob Hope Comedy Special | NBC |
| 1965 (17th) | Dean Jagger | Principal Albert Vane | Mr. Novak | NBC |
| 1965 (17th) | Danny Kaye | Himself | The Danny Kaye Show | CBS |
| 1965 (17th) | David McCallum | Illya Kuryakin | The Man from U.N.C.L.E. | NBC |
| 1965 (17th) | Red Skelton | Himself | The Red Skelton Hour | CBS |
Outstanding Performance by an Actress in a Supporting Role in a Comedy Series
1966 (18th)
| 1966 (18th) | Alice Pearce (posthumously) | Gladys Kravitz | Bewitched | ABC |
| 1966 (18th) | Rose Marie | Sally Rogers | The Dick Van Dyke Show | CBS |
| 1966 (18th) | Agnes Moorehead | Endora | Bewitched | ABC |
1967 (19th)
| 1967 (19th) | Frances Bavier | Aunt Bee | The Andy Griffith Show | CBS |
| 1967 (19th) | Nancy Kulp | Jane Hathaway | The Beverly Hillbillies | CBS |
| 1967 (19th) | Marion Lorne | Aunt Clara | Bewitched | ABC |
1968 (20th)
| 1968 (20th) | Marion Lorne (posthumously) | Aunt Clara | Bewitched | ABC |
| 1968 (20th) | Agnes Moorehead | Endora | Bewitched | ABC |
| 1968 (20th) | Marge Redmond | Sister Jacqueline | The Flying Nun | ABC |
| 1968 (20th) | Nita Talbot § | Marya | Hogan's Heroes | CBS |
Outstanding Continued Performance by an Actress in a Supporting Role in a Series
1969 (21st)
| 1969 (21st) | Susan Saint James | Peggy Maxwell | The Name of the Game | NBC |
| 1969 (21st) | Barbara Anderson | Officer Eve Whitfield | Ironside | NBC |
| 1969 (21st) | Agnes Moorehead | Endora | Bewitched | ABC |

=== 1970s ===
| Year | Actress | Role | Program | Network |
Outstanding Performance by an Actress in a Supporting Role in Comedy
1970 (22nd)
| 1970 (22nd) | Karen Valentine | Miss Alice Johnson | Room 222 | ABC |
| 1970 (22nd) | Agnes Moorehead | Endora | Bewitched | ABC |
| 1970 (22nd) | Lurene Tuttle | Hannah Yarby | Julia | NBC |
1971 (23rd)
| 1971 (23rd) | Valerie Harper | Rhoda Morgenstern | The Mary Tyler Moore Show | CBS |
| 1971 (23rd) | Agnes Moorehead | Endora | Bewitched | ABC |
| 1971 (23rd) | Karen Valentine | Miss Alice Johnston | Room 222 | ABC |
1972 (24th)
| 1972 (24th) | Valerie Harper | Rhoda Morgenstern | The Mary Tyler Moore Show | CBS |
| 1972 (24th) | Sally Struthers | Gloria Stivic | All in the Family | CBS |
| 1972 (24th) | Cloris Leachman | Phyllis Lindstrom | The Mary Tyler Moore Show | CBS |
1973 (25th)
| 1973 (25th) | Valerie Harper | Rhoda Morgenstern | The Mary Tyler Moore Show | CBS |
| 1973 (25th) | Cloris Leachman | Phyllis Lindstrom | The Mary Tyler Moore Show | CBS |
| 1973 (25th) | Sally Struthers | Gloria Stivic | All in the Family | CBS |
Best Supporting Actress in Comedy
1974 (26th)
| 1974 (26th) | Cloris Leachman | Phyllis Lindstrom | The Mary Tyler Moore Show | CBS |
| 1974 (26th) | Valerie Harper | Rhoda Morgenstern | The Mary Tyler Moore Show | CBS |
| 1974 (26th) | Sally Struthers | Gloria Stivic | All in the Family | CBS |
| 1974 (26th) | Loretta Swit | Maj. Margaret Houlihan | M*A*S*H | CBS |
Outstanding Continuing Performance by a Supporting Actress in a Comedy Series
1975 (27th)
| 1975 (27th) | Betty White | Sue Ann Nivens | The Mary Tyler Moore Show | CBS |
| 1975 (27th) | Julie Kavner | Brenda Morgenstern | Rhoda | CBS |
| 1975 (27th) | Loretta Swit | Maj. Margaret Houlihan | M*A*S*H | CBS |
| 1975 (27th) | Nancy Walker | Ida Morgenstern | Rhoda | CBS |
1976 (28th)
| 1976 (28th) | Betty White | Sue Ann Nivens | The Mary Tyler Moore Show | CBS |
| 1976 (28th) | Georgia Engel | Georgette Franklin | The Mary Tyler Moore Show | CBS |
| 1976 (28th) | Julie Kavner | Brenda Morgenstern | Rhoda | CBS |
| 1976 (28th) | Loretta Swit | Maj. Margaret Houlihan | M*A*S*H | CBS |
| 1976 (28th) | Nancy Walker | Ida Morgenstern | Rhoda | CBS |
1977 (29th)
| 1977 (29th) | Mary Kay Place | Loretta Haggers | Mary Hartman, Mary Hartman | Syndicated |
| 1977 (29th) | Georgia Engel | Georgette Franklin | The Mary Tyler Moore Show | CBS |
| 1977 (29th) | Julie Kavner | Brenda Morgenstern | Rhoda | CBS |
| 1977 (29th) | Loretta Swit | Maj. Margaret Houlihan | M*A*S*H | CBS |
| 1977 (29th) | Betty White | Sue Ann Nivens | The Mary Tyler Moore Show | CBS |
1978 (30th)
| 1978 (30th) | Julie Kavner | Brenda Morgenstern | Rhoda | CBS |
| 1978 (30th) | Polly Holliday | Florence Jean Castleberry | Alice | CBS |
| 1978 (30th) | Sally Struthers | Gloria Stivic | All in the Family | CBS |
| 1978 (30th) | Loretta Swit | Maj. Margaret Houlihan | M*A*S*H | CBS |
| 1978 (30th) | Nancy Walker | Ida Morgenstern | Rhoda | CBS |
Outstanding Supporting Actress in a Comedy or Comedy-Variety or Music Series
1979 (31st)
| 1979 (31st) | Sally Struthers | Gloria Stivic | All in the Family | CBS |
| 1979 (31st) | Marion Ross | Marion Cunningham | Happy Days | ABC |
| 1979 (31st) | Polly Holliday | Florence Jean Castleberry | Alice | CBS |
| 1979 (31st) | Loretta Swit | Maj. Margaret Houlihan | M*A*S*H | CBS |

=== 1980s ===
| Year | Actress | Role | Program | Network |
Outstanding Supporting Actress in a Comedy or Variety or Music Series
1980 (32nd)
| 1980 (32nd) | Loretta Swit | Maj. Margaret Houlihan | M*A*S*H | CBS |
| 1980 (32nd) | Loni Anderson | Jennifer Marlowe | WKRP in Cincinnati | CBS |
| 1980 (32nd) | Polly Holliday | Florence Jean Castleberry | Alice | CBS |
| 1980 (32nd) | Inga Swenson | Gretchen Kraus | Benson | ABC |
1981 (33rd)
| 1981 (33rd) | Eileen Brennan | Cpt. Doreen Lewis | Private Benjamin | CBS |
| 1981 (33rd) | Loni Anderson | Jennifer Marlowe | WKRP in Cincinnati | CBS |
| 1981 (33rd) | Marla Gibbs | Florence Johnston | The Jeffersons | CBS |
| 1981 (33rd) | Anne Meara | Veronica Rooney | Archie Bunker's Place | CBS |
| 1981 (33rd) | Loretta Swit | Maj. Margaret Houlihan | M*A*S*H | CBS |
1982 (34th)
| 1982 (34th) | Loretta Swit | Maj. Margaret Houlihan | M*A*S*H | CBS |
| 1982 (34th) | Eileen Brennan | Cpt. Doreen Lewis | Private Benjamin | CBS |
| 1982 (34th) | Marla Gibbs | Florence Johnston | The Jeffersons | CBS |
| 1982 (34th) | Andrea Martin | Various Characters | SCTV Network | NBC |
| 1982 (34th) | Anne Meara | Veronica Rooney | Archie Bunker's Place | CBS |
| 1982 (34th) | Inga Swenson | Gretchen Kraus | Benson | ABC |
Outstanding Supporting Actress in a Comedy, Variety or Music Series
1983 (35th)
| 1983 (35th) | Carol Kane | Simka Dahblitz | Taxi | NBC |
| 1983 (35th) | Eileen Brennan | Cpt. Doreen Lewis | Private Benjamin | CBS |
| 1983 (35th) | Marla Gibbs | Florence Johnston | The Jeffersons | CBS |
| 1983 (35th) | Rhea Perlman | Carla Tortelli | Cheers | NBC |
| 1983 (35th) | Loretta Swit | Maj. Margaret Houlihan | M*A*S*H | CBS |
Outstanding Supporting Actress in a Comedy Series
1984 (36th)
| 1984 (36th) | Rhea Perlman | Carla Tortelli | Cheers | NBC |
| 1984 (36th) | Julia Duffy | Stephanie Vanderkellen | Newhart | CBS |
| 1984 (36th) | Marla Gibbs | Florence Johnston | The Jeffersons | CBS |
| 1984 (36th) | Paula Kelly | Liz Williams | Night Court | NBC |
| 1984 (36th) | Marion Ross | Marion Cunningham | Happy Days | ABC |
1985 (37th)
| 1985 (37th) | Rhea Perlman | Carla Tortelli | Cheers | NBC |
| 1985 (37th) | Selma Diamond | Selma Hacker | Night Court | NBC |
| 1985 (37th) | Julia Duffy | Stephanie Vanderkellen | Newhart | CBS |
| 1985 (37th) | Marla Gibbs | Florence Johnston | The Jeffersons | CBS |
| 1985 (37th) | Inga Swenson | Gretchen Kraus | Benson | ABC |
1986 (38th)
| 1986 (38th) | Rhea Perlman | Carla Tortelli | Cheers | NBC |
| 1986 (38th) | Justine Bateman | Mallory Keaton | Family Ties | NBC |
| 1986 (38th) | Lisa Bonet | Denise Huxtable | The Cosby Show | NBC |
| 1986 (38th) | Julia Duffy | Stephanie Vanderkellen | Newhart | CBS |
| 1986 (38th) | Estelle Getty | Sophia Petrillo | The Golden Girls | NBC |
| 1986 (38th) | Keshia Knight Pulliam | Rudy Huxtable | The Cosby Show | NBC |
1987 (39th)
| 1987 (39th) | Jackée Harry | Sandra Clark | 227 | NBC |
| 1987 (39th) | Justine Bateman | Mallory Keaton | Family Ties | NBC |
| 1987 (39th) | Julia Duffy | Stephanie Vanderkellen | Newhart | CBS |
| 1987 (39th) | Estelle Getty | Sophia Petrillo | The Golden Girls | NBC |
| 1987 (39th) | Rhea Perlman | Carla Tortelli | Cheers | NBC |
1988 (40th)
| 1988 (40th) | Estelle Getty | Sophia Petrillo | The Golden Girls | NBC |
| 1988 (40th) | Julia Duffy | Stephanie Vanderkellen | Newhart | CBS |
| 1988 (40th) | Jackée Harry | Sandra Clark | 227 | NBC |
| 1988 (40th) | Katherine Helmond | Mona Robinson | Who's the Boss? | ABC |
| 1988 (40th) | Rhea Perlman | Carla Tortelli | Cheers | NBC |
1989 (41st)
| 1989 (41st) | Rhea Perlman | Carla Tortelli | Cheers | NBC |
| 1989 (41st) | Julia Duffy | Stephanie Vanderkellen | Newhart | CBS |
| 1989 (41st) | Faith Ford | Corky Sherwood | Murphy Brown | CBS |
| 1989 (41st) | Estelle Getty | Sophia Petrillo | The Golden Girls | NBC |
| 1989 (41st) | Katherine Helmond | Mona Robinson | Who's the Boss? | ABC |

=== 1990s ===
| Year | Actress | Role | Program | Episode Submissions | Network |
|---|---|---|---|---|---|
1990 (42nd)
| 1990 (42nd) | Bebe Neuwirth | Lilith Sternin | Cheers | "The Stork Brings a Crane" + "Severe Crane Damage" + "The Ghost and Mrs Lebec" | NBC |
| 1990 (42nd) | Julia Duffy | Stephanie Vanderkellen | Newhart | "Cupcake in a Cage" + "Lights, Camera, Contradictions!" + "Seein' Double" | CBS |
| 1990 (42nd) | Faith Ford | Corky Sherwood | Murphy Brown | "And the Whiner Is..." + "Bad Girls" + "Going to the Chapel" | CBS |
| 1990 (42nd) | Estelle Getty | Sophia Petrillo | The Golden Girls | "Sick and Tired" + "Not Another Monday" + "Clinton Avenue Memoirs" | NBC |
| 1990 (42nd) | Rhea Perlman | Carla Tortelli | Cheers | "Death Takes a Holiday on Ice" + "50-50 Carla" + "The Ghost and Mrs Lebec" | NBC |
1991 (43rd)
| 1991 (43rd) | Bebe Neuwirth | Lilith Sternin | Cheers | "Veggie-Boyd" + "Rat Girl" | NBC |
| 1991 (43rd) | Elizabeth Ashley | Frieda Evans | Evening Shade | "There Once Was a Boy Named Wood" + "Chip Off the Old Brick" | CBS |
| 1991 (43rd) | Faith Ford | Corky Sherwood | Murphy Brown | "Trouble in Sherwood-Forrest" + "Corky's Place" | CBS |
| 1991 (43rd) | Estelle Getty | Sophia Petrillo | The Golden Girls | "Ebbtide's Revenge" + "There Goes the Bride: Part 1" | NBC |
| 1991 (43rd) | Rhea Perlman | Carla Tortelli | Cheers | "Carla Loves Clavin" + "Pitch It Again, Sam" | NBC |
1992 (44th)
| 1992 (44th) | Laurie Metcalf | Jackie Harris | Roseanne | "Why Jackie Becomes a Trucker" + "Kansas City, Here We Come" | ABC |
| 1992 (44th) | Faith Ford | Corky Sherwood | Murphy Brown | "Love is a Blonde" + "A Chance of Showers" | CBS |
| 1992 (44th) | Estelle Getty | Sophia Petrillo | The Golden Girls | "One Flew Out of the Cuckoo's Nest" | NBC |
| 1992 (44th) | Alice Ghostley | Bernice Clifton | Designing Women | "The Strange Case of Clarence and Anita" + "Just Say Doe" | CBS |
| 1992 (44th) | Julia Louis-Dreyfus | Elaine Benes | Seinfeld | "The Pen" + "The Tape" | NBC |
| 1992 (44th) | Frances Sternhagen § | Esther Clavin | Cheers | "Heeeeeere's... Cliffy!" | NBC |
1993 (45th)
| 1993 (45th) | Laurie Metcalf | Jackie Harris | Roseanne | "Crime and Punishment" + "Wait Till Your Father Gets Home" | ABC |
| 1993 (45th) | Shelley Fabares | Christine Armstrong-Fox | Coach | "Love Me Tender" + "Vows" | ABC |
| 1993 (45th) | Sara Gilbert | Darlene Conner | Roseanne | "Good Girls, Bad Girls" + "Playing With Matches" | ABC |
| 1993 (45th) | Julia Louis-Dreyfus | Elaine Benes | Seinfeld | "The Contest" + "The Airport" | NBC |
| 1993 (45th) | Rhea Perlman | Carla Tortelli | Cheers | "Loathe and Marriage" + "It's Lonely on the Top" | NBC |
1994 (46th)
| 1994 (46th) | Laurie Metcalf | Jackie Harris | Roseanne | "Labor Day" + "Past Imperfect" | ABC |
| 1994 (46th) | Shelley Fabares | Christine Armstrong-Fox | Coach | "Nice Job If You Can Get It" + "The Stand-In" | ABC |
| 1994 (46th) | Faith Ford | Corky Sherwood | Murphy Brown | "The Young and the Rest of Us" + "The More Things Stay the Same" | CBS |
| 1994 (46th) | Sara Gilbert | Darlene Conner | Roseanne | "Two Down, One to Go" + "Everybody Comes to Jackie's" | ABC |
| 1994 (46th) | Julia Louis-Dreyfus | Elaine Benes | Seinfeld | "The Mango" + "The Opposite" | NBC |
| 1994 (46th) | Liz Torres | Mahalia Sanchez | The John Larroquette Show | "Pilot" + "God" | NBC |
1995 (47th)
| 1995 (47th) | Christine Baranski | Maryann Thorpe | Cybill | "Starting on the Wrong Foot" | CBS |
| 1995 (47th) | Lisa Kudrow | Phoebe Buffay | Friends | "The One with the Monkey" + "The One with Two Parts: Part 1 " | NBC |
| 1995 (47th) | Julia Louis-Dreyfus | Elaine Benes | Seinfeld | "The Beard" + "The Fusilli Jerry" | NBC |
| 1995 (47th) | Laurie Metcalf | Jackie Harris | Roseanne | "Bed and Bored" + "Single Married Female" | ABC |
| 1995 (47th) | Liz Torres | Mahalia Sanchez | The John Larroquette Show | "Faith" + "In the Pink" | NBC |
1996 (48th)
| 1996 (48th) | Julia Louis-Dreyfus | Elaine Benes | Seinfeld | "The Soup Nazi" + "The Wait Out" | NBC |
| 1996 (48th) | Christine Baranski | Maryann Thorpe | Cybill | "A Who's Who for What's His Name" + "Wedding Bell Blues" | CBS |
| 1996 (48th) | Janeane Garofalo | Paula | The Larry Sanders Show | "Conflict of Interest" + "I Was a Teenage Lesbian" | HBO |
| 1996 (48th) | Jayne Meadows | Alice Morgan-DuPont-Sutton-Cushing-Ferruke | High Society | "Family Val's" + "Alice Doesn't Pump Here Anymore" | CBS |
| 1996 (48th) | Renée Taylor | Sylvia Fine | The Nanny | "Where's the Pearls?" + "The Cantor Show" | CBS |
1997 (49th)
| 1997 (49th) | Kristen Johnston | Sally Solomon | 3rd Rock from the Sun | "My Mother the Alien" + "Fifteen Minutes of Dick" | NBC |
| 1997 (49th) | Christine Baranski | Maryann Thorpe | Cybill | —N/a | CBS |
| 1997 (49th) | Janeane Garofalo | Paula | The Larry Sanders Show | —N/a | HBO |
| 1997 (49th) | Lisa Kudrow | Phoebe Buffay | Friends | "The One with the Metaphorical Tunnel" + "The One with the Flashback" | NBC |
| 1997 (49th) | Julia Louis-Dreyfus | Elaine Benes | Seinfeld | "The Little Kicks" | NBC |
1998 (50th)
| 1998 (50th) | Lisa Kudrow | Phoebe Buffay | Friends | "The One with Ross's Wedding" | NBC |
| 1998 (50th) | Christine Baranski | Maryann Thorpe | Cybill | "The Golden Years" | CBS |
| 1998 (50th) | Kristen Johnston | Sally Solomon | 3rd Rock from the Sun | —N/a | NBC |
| 1998 (50th) | Jane Leeves | Daphne Moon | Frasier | "Where Every Bloke Knows Your Name" + "First Date" | NBC |
| 1998 (50th) | Julia Louis-Dreyfus | Elaine Benes | Seinfeld | —N/a | NBC |
1999 (51st)
| 1999 (51st) | Kristen Johnston | Sally Solomon | 3rd Rock from the Sun | "Two-Faced Dick" + "Dick 'The Mouth' Solomon" | NBC |
| 1999 (51st) | Lisa Kudrow | Phoebe Buffay | Friends | "The One Hundredth" + "The One Where Everybody Finds Out" | NBC |
| 1999 (51st) | Lucy Liu | Ling Woo | Ally McBeal | "Angels and Blimps" + "Sex, Lies, and Politics" | Fox |
| 1999 (51st) | Wendie Malick | Nina Van Horn | Just Shoot Me! | "Two Girls for Every Boy" + "Slow Donnie" | NBC |
| 1999 (51st) | Doris Roberts | Marie Barone | Everybody Loves Raymond | "The Toaster" + "Frank's Tribute" | CBS |

=== 2000s ===
| Year | Actress | Role | Program | Episode Submissions | Network |
|---|---|---|---|---|---|
2000 (52nd)
| 2000 (52nd) | Megan Mullally | Karen Walker | Will & Grace | "To Serve and Disinfect" + "Polk Defeats Truman" | NBC |
| 2000 (52nd) | Jennifer Aniston | Rachel Green | Friends | "The One with Rachel's Sister" + "The One Where Chandler Can't Cry" | NBC |
| 2000 (52nd) | Kim Cattrall | Samantha Jones | Sex and the City | "The Awful Truth" + "The Freak Show" | HBO |
| 2000 (52nd) | Lisa Kudrow | Phoebe Buffay | Friends | "The One That Could Have Been" | NBC |
| 2000 (52nd) | Doris Roberts | Marie Barone | Everybody Loves Raymond | "Sex Talk" + "Robert's Divorce" | CBS |
2001 (53rd)
| 2001 (53rd) | Doris Roberts | Marie Barone | Everybody Loves Raymond | "The Sneeze" + "Ray's Journal" | CBS |
| 2001 (53rd) | Jennifer Aniston | Rachel Green | Friends | "The One with Rachel's Assistant" + "The One Where They All Turn Thirty" | NBC |
| 2001 (53rd) | Kim Cattrall | Samantha Jones | Sex and the City | "Where There's Smoke..." + "Running with Scissors" | HBO |
| 2001 (53rd) | Lisa Kudrow | Phoebe Buffay | Friends | "The One with Phoebe's Cookies" + "The One with Joey's New Brain" | NBC |
| 2001 (53rd) | Megan Mullally | Karen Walker | Will & Grace | "Husbands and Trophy Wives" + "Crazy in Love" | NBC |
2002 (54th)
| 2002 (54th) | Doris Roberts | Marie Barone | Everybody Loves Raymond | "Lucky Suit" + "Marie's Sculpture" | CBS |
| 2002 (54th) | Kim Cattrall | Samantha Jones | Sex and the City | "Belles of the Balls" + "I Heart NY" | HBO |
| 2002 (54th) | Wendie Malick | Nina Van Horn | Just Shoot Me! | "Nina Van Grandma" + "The Boys in the Band" | NBC |
| 2002 (54th) | Megan Mullally | Karen Walker | Will & Grace | "Grace in the Hole" + "A.I.: Artificial Insemination" | NBC |
| 2002 (54th) | Cynthia Nixon | Miranda Hobbes | Sex and the City | "My Motherboard, My Self" + "Change of a Dress" | HBO |
2003 (55th)
| 2003 (55th) | Doris Roberts | Marie Barone | Everybody Loves Raymond | "Marie's Vision" + "Robert's Wedding" | CBS |
| 2003 (55th) | Kim Cattrall | Samantha Jones | Sex and the City | "Cover Girl" + "Critical Condition" | HBO |
| 2003 (55th) | Cheryl Hines | Cheryl David | Curb Your Enthusiasm | "The Terrorist Attack" + "Krazee-Eyez Killa" | HBO |
| 2003 (55th) | Megan Mullally | Karen Walker | Will & Grace | "The Honeymoon's Over" + "23" | NBC |
| 2003 (55th) | Cynthia Nixon | Miranda Hobbes | Sex and the City | "Anchors Away" + "Cover Girl" | HBO |
2004 (56th)
| 2004 (56th) | Cynthia Nixon | Miranda Hobbes | Sex and the City | "One" + "The Ick Factor" | HBO |
| 2004 (56th) | Kim Cattrall | Samantha Jones | Sex and the City | "Out of the Frying Pan" + "An American Girl in Paris (Part Une)" | HBO |
| 2004 (56th) | Kristin Davis | Charlotte York Goldenblatt | Sex and the City | "Hop, Skip, and a Week" + "Splat!" | HBO |
| 2004 (56th) | Megan Mullally | Karen Walker | Will & Grace | "Heart Like a Wheelchair" + "Speechless" | NBC |
| 2004 (56th) | Doris Roberts | Marie Barone | Everybody Loves Raymond | "Thank You Notes" + "Liars" | CBS |
2005 (57th)
| 2005 (57th) | Doris Roberts | Marie Barone | Everybody Loves Raymond | "Tasteless Frank" + "The Finale" | CBS |
| 2005 (57th) | Conchata Ferrell | Berta | Two and a Half Men | "Can You Eat Human Flesh with Wooden Teeth?" + "Woo-Hoo, a Hernia Exam!" | CBS |
| 2005 (57th) | Megan Mullally | Karen Walker | Will & Grace | "The Birds and the Bees" + "Saving Grace, Again: Part I" | NBC |
| 2005 (57th) | Holland Taylor | Evelyn Harper | Two and a Half Men | "Those Big Pink Things with Coconut" + "A Sympathetic Crotch to Cry On" | CBS |
| 2005 (57th) | Jessica Walter | Lucille Bluth | Arrested Development | "Motherboy XXX" + "Spring Breakout" | Fox |
2006 (58th)
| 2006 (58th) | Megan Mullally | Karen Walker | Will & Grace | "The Finale" | NBC |
| 2006 (58th) | Cheryl Hines | Cheryl David | Curb Your Enthusiasm | "The Bowtie" + "The Korean Bookie" | HBO |
| 2006 (58th) | Elizabeth Perkins | Celia Hodes | Weeds | "You Can't Miss the Bear" + "The Punishment Light" | Showtime |
| 2006 (58th) | Jaime Pressly | Joy Turner | My Name Is Earl | "Joy's Wedding" + "The Bounty Hunter" | NBC |
| 2006 (58th) | Alfre Woodard | Betty Applewhite | Desperate Housewives | "You'll Never Get Away From Me" + "I Know Things Now" | ABC |
2007 (59th)
| 2007 (59th) | Jaime Pressly | Joy Turner | My Name Is Earl | "Jump for Joy" | NBC |
| 2007 (59th) | Conchata Ferrell | Berta | Two and a Half Men | "Repeated Blows to His Unformed Head" | CBS |
| 2007 (59th) | Jenna Fischer | Pam Beesly | The Office | "The Job" | NBC |
| 2007 (59th) | Elizabeth Perkins | Celia Hodes | Weeds | "Pittsburgh" | Showtime |
| 2007 (59th) | Holland Taylor | Evelyn Harper | Two and a Half Men | "The Sea Is a Harsh Mistress" | CBS |
| 2007 (59th) | Vanessa Williams | Wilhelmina Slater | Ugly Betty | "Don't Ask, Don't Tell" | ABC |
2008 (60th)
| 2008 (60th) | Jean Smart | Regina Newly | Samantha Who? | "The Girlfriend" | ABC |
| 2008 (60th) | Kristin Chenoweth | Olive Snook | Pushing Daisies | "Girth" | ABC |
| 2008 (60th) | Amy Poehler | Various characters | Saturday Night Live | "Host: Tina Fey" | NBC |
| 2008 (60th) | Holland Taylor | Evelyn Harper | Two and a Half Men | "Media Room Slash Dungeon" | CBS |
| 2008 (60th) | Vanessa Williams | Wilhelmina Slater | Ugly Betty | "Bananas for Betty" | ABC |
2009 (61st)
| 2009 (61st) | Kristin Chenoweth | Olive Snook | Pushing Daisies | "Bad Habits" | ABC |
| 2009 (61st) | Jane Krakowski | Jenna Maroney | 30 Rock | "The Ones" | NBC |
| 2009 (61st) | Elizabeth Perkins | Celia Hodes | Weeds | "No Man Is Pudding" | Showtime |
| 2009 (61st) | Amy Poehler | Various characters | Saturday Night Live | "Host: Josh Brolin" | NBC |
| 2009 (61st) | Kristen Wiig | Various characters | Saturday Night Live | "Host: Neil Patrick Harris" | NBC |
| 2009 (61st) | Vanessa Williams | Wilhelmina Slater | Ugly Betty | "The Fall Issue" | ABC |

=== 2010s ===
| Year | Actress | Role | Program | Episode Submissions | Network |
|---|---|---|---|---|---|
2010 (62nd)
| 2010 (62nd) | Jane Lynch | Sue Sylvester | Glee | "The Power of Madonna" | Fox |
| 2010 (62nd) | Julie Bowen | Claire Dunphy | Modern Family | "My Funky Valentine" | ABC |
| 2010 (62nd) | Jane Krakowski | Jenna Maroney | 30 Rock | "Black Light Attack!" | NBC |
| 2010 (62nd) | Sofía Vergara | Gloria Pritchett | Modern Family | "Not in My House" | ABC |
| 2010 (62nd) | Holland Taylor | Evelyn Harper | Two and a Half Men | "Give Me Your Thumb" | CBS |
| 2010 (62nd) | Kristen Wiig | Various characters | Saturday Night Live | "Host: James Franco" | NBC |
2011 (63rd)
| 2011 (63rd) | Julie Bowen | Claire Dunphy | Modern Family | "Strangers on a Treadmill" | ABC |
| 2011 (63rd) | Jane Krakowski | Jenna Maroney | 30 Rock | "Queen of Jordan" | NBC |
| 2011 (63rd) | Jane Lynch | Sue Sylvester | Glee | "Funeral" | Fox |
| 2011 (63rd) | Sofía Vergara | Gloria Pritchett | Modern Family | "Slow Down Your Neighbors" | ABC |
| 2011 (63rd) | Betty White | Elka Ostrovsky | Hot in Cleveland | "Free Elka" | TV Land |
| 2011 (63rd) | Kristen Wiig | Various characters | Saturday Night Live | "Host: Jane Lynch" | NBC |
2012 (64th)
| 2012 (64th) | Julie Bowen | Claire Dunphy | Modern Family | "Go Bullfrogs!" | ABC |
| 2012 (64th) | Mayim Bialik | Amy Farrah Fowler | The Big Bang Theory | "The Shiny Trinket Maneuver" | CBS |
| 2012 (64th) | Kathryn Joosten | Karen McCluskey | Desperate Housewives | "Give Me the Blame" + "Finishing the Hat" | ABC |
| 2012 (64th) | Sofía Vergara | Gloria Pritchett | Modern Family | "Tableau Vivant" | ABC |
| 2012 (64th) | Merritt Wever | Zoey Barkow | Nurse Jackie | "One-Armed Jacks" | Showtime |
| 2012 (64th) | Kristen Wiig | Various characters | Saturday Night Live | "Host: Mick Jagger" | NBC |
2013 (65th)
| 2013 (65th) | Merritt Wever | Zoey Barkow | Nurse Jackie | "Teachable Moments" | Showtime |
| 2013 (65th) | Mayim Bialik | Amy Farrah Fowler | The Big Bang Theory | "The Fish Guts Displacement" | CBS |
| 2013 (65th) | Julie Bowen | Claire Dunphy | Modern Family | "My Hero" | ABC |
| 2013 (65th) | Anna Chlumsky | Amy Brookheimer | Veep | "First Response" | HBO |
| 2013 (65th) | Jane Krakowski | Jenna Maroney | 30 Rock | "Hogcock!" + "Last Lunch" | NBC |
| 2013 (65th) | Jane Lynch | Sue Sylvester | Glee | "Feud" | Fox |
| 2013 (65th) | Sofía Vergara | Gloria Delgado-Pritchett | Modern Family | "Yard Sale" | ABC |
2014 (66th)
| 2014 (66th) | Allison Janney | Bonnie Plunkett | Mom | "Estrogen and a Hearty Breakfast" | CBS |
| 2014 (66th) | Mayim Bialik | Amy Farrah Fowler | The Big Bang Theory | "The Indecision Amalgamation" | CBS |
| 2014 (66th) | Julie Bowen | Claire Dunphy | Modern Family | "The Feud" | ABC |
| 2014 (66th) | Anna Chlumsky | Amy Brookheimer | Veep | "Detroit" | HBO |
| 2014 (66th) | Kate McKinnon | Various characters | Saturday Night Live | "Host: Anna Kendrick" | NBC |
| 2014 (66th) | Kate Mulgrew | Galina "Red" Reznikov | Orange Is the New Black | "Tit Punch" | Netflix |
2015 (67th)
| 2015 (67th) | Allison Janney | Bonnie Plunkett | Mom | "Dropped Soap and a Big Guy on a Throne" | CBS |
| 2015 (67th) | Mayim Bialik | Amy Farrah Fowler | The Big Bang Theory | "The Prom Equivalency" | CBS |
| 2015 (67th) | Julie Bowen | Claire Dunphy | Modern Family | "Valentine's Day 4: Twisted Sister" | ABC |
| 2015 (67th) | Anna Chlumsky | Amy Brookheimer | Veep | "Convention" | HBO |
| 2015 (67th) | Gaby Hoffmann | Ali Pfefferman | Transparent | "Rollin'" | Amazon |
| 2015 (67th) | Jane Krakowski | Jacqueline Voorhees | Unbreakable Kimmy Schmidt | "Kimmy Gets a Job!" | Netflix |
| 2015 (67th) | Kate McKinnon | Various characters | Saturday Night Live | "Host: Taraji P. Henson" | NBC |
| 2015 (67th) | Niecy Nash | Denise "DiDi" Ortley | Getting On | "The 7th Annual Christmas Card Competition" | HBO |
2016 (68th)
| 2016 (68th) | Kate McKinnon | Various characters | Saturday Night Live | "Host: Ariana Grande" | NBC |
| 2016 (68th) | Anna Chlumsky | Amy Brookheimer | Veep | "C**tgate" | HBO |
| 2016 (68th) | Gaby Hoffmann | Ali Pfefferman | Transparent | "Bulnerable" | Amazon |
| 2016 (68th) | Allison Janney | Bonnie Plunkett | Mom | "Terrorists and Gingerbread" | CBS |
| 2016 (68th) | Judith Light | Shelly Pfefferman | Transparent | "Flicky-Flicky Thump-Thump" | Amazon |
| 2016 (68th) | Niecy Nash | Denise "DiDi" Ortley | Getting On | "Don't Let It Get in You or on You" | HBO |
2017 (69th)
| 2017 (69th) | Kate McKinnon | Various characters | Saturday Night Live | "Host: Dave Chappelle" | NBC |
| 2017 (69th) | Vanessa Bayer | Various characters | Saturday Night Live | "Host: Dwayne Johnson" | NBC |
| 2017 (69th) | Anna Chlumsky | Amy Brookheimer | Veep | "Groundbreaking" | HBO |
| 2017 (69th) | Kathryn Hahn | Raquel Fein | Transparent | "Life Sucks and Then You Die" | Amazon |
| 2017 (69th) | Leslie Jones | Various characters | Saturday Night Live | "Host: Tom Hanks" | NBC |
| 2017 (69th) | Judith Light | Shelly Pfefferman | Transparent | "Exciting and New" | Amazon |
2018 (70th)
| 2018 (70th) | Alex Borstein | Susie Myerson | The Marvelous Mrs. Maisel | "Doink" | Amazon |
| 2018 (70th) | Zazie Beetz | Vanessa "Van" Keefer | Atlanta | "Helen" | FX |
| 2018 (70th) | Aidy Bryant | Various characters | Saturday Night Live | "Host: Chadwick Boseman" | NBC |
| 2018 (70th) | Betty Gilpin | Debbie "Liberty Belle" Eagan | GLOW | "Debbie Does Something" | Netflix |
| 2018 (70th) | Leslie Jones | Various characters | Saturday Night Live | "Host: Donald Glover" | NBC |
| 2018 (70th) | Kate McKinnon | Various characters | Saturday Night Live | "Host: Bill Hader" | NBC |
| 2018 (70th) | Laurie Metcalf | Jackie Harris | Roseanne | "No Country for Old Women" | ABC |
| 2018 (70th) | Megan Mullally | Karen Walker | Will & Grace | "Rosario's Quinceanera" | NBC |
2019 (71st)
| 2019 (71st) | Alex Borstein | Susie Myerson | The Marvelous Mrs. Maisel | "Vote for Kennedy, Vote for Kennedy" | Amazon |
| 2019 (71st) | Anna Chlumsky | Amy Brookheimer | Veep | "Pledge" | HBO |
| 2019 (71st) | Sian Clifford | Claire | Fleabag | "Episode 203" | Amazon |
| 2019 (71st) | Olivia Colman | Godmother | Fleabag | "Episode 204" | Amazon |
| 2019 (71st) | Betty Gilpin | Debbie "Liberty Belle" Eagan | GLOW | "Mother of All Matches" | Netflix |
| 2019 (71st) | Sarah Goldberg | Sally Reed | Barry | "The Audition" | HBO |
| 2019 (71st) | Marin Hinkle | Rose Weissman | The Marvelous Mrs. Maisel | "Simone" | Amazon |
| 2019 (71st) | Kate McKinnon | Various characters | Saturday Night Live | "Host: Liev Schreiber" | NBC |

=== 2020s ===
| Year | Actress | Role | Program | Episode Submission | Network |
|---|---|---|---|---|---|
2020 (72nd)
| 2020 (72nd) | Annie Murphy | Alexis Rose | Schitt's Creek | "The Presidential Suite" | Pop TV |
| 2020 (72nd) | Alex Borstein | Susie Myerson | The Marvelous Mrs. Maisel | "Marvelous Radio" | Amazon |
| 2020 (72nd) | D'Arcy Carden | Janet | The Good Place | "You've Changed, Man" | NBC |
| 2020 (72nd) | Betty Gilpin | Debbie "Liberty Belle" Eagan | GLOW | "A Very GLOW Christmas" | Netflix |
| 2020 (72nd) | Marin Hinkle | Rose Weissman | The Marvelous Mrs. Maisel | "A Jewish Girl Walks Into the Apollo..." | Amazon |
| 2020 (72nd) | Kate McKinnon | Various characters | Saturday Night Live | "Host: Daniel Craig" | NBC |
| 2020 (72nd) | Yvonne Orji | Molly Carter | Insecure | "Lowkey Lost" | HBO |
| 2020 (72nd) | Cecily Strong | Various characters | Saturday Night Live | "Host: Eddie Murphy" | NBC |
2021 (73rd)
| 2021 (73rd) | Hannah Waddingham | Rebecca Welton | Ted Lasso | "All Apologies" | Apple TV+ |
| 2021 (73rd) | Aidy Bryant | Various characters | Saturday Night Live | "Host: Regé-Jean Page" | NBC |
| 2021 (73rd) | Hannah Einbinder | Ava Daniels | Hacks | "I Think She Will" | HBO Max |
| 2021 (73rd) | Kate McKinnon | Various characters | Saturday Night Live | "Host: Bill Burr" | NBC |
| 2021 (73rd) | Rosie Perez | Megan Briscoe | The Flight Attendant | "Arrivals and Departures" | HBO Max |
| 2021 (73rd) | Cecily Strong | Various characters | Saturday Night Live | "Host: Anya Taylor-Joy" | NBC |
| 2021 (73rd) | Juno Temple | Keeley Jones | Ted Lasso | "For the Children" | Apple TV+ |
2022 (74th)
| 2022 (74th) | Sheryl Lee Ralph | Barbara Howard | Abbott Elementary | "New Tech" | ABC |
| 2022 (74th) | Alex Borstein | Susie Myerson | The Marvelous Mrs. Maisel | "Everything Is Bellmore" | Prime Video |
| 2022 (74th) | Hannah Einbinder | Ava Daniels | Hacks | "The Captain's Wife" | HBO Max |
| 2022 (74th) | Janelle James | Ava Coleman | Abbott Elementary | "Ava vs. Superintendent" | ABC |
| 2022 (74th) | Kate McKinnon | Various characters | Saturday Night Live | "Host: Natasha Lyonne" | NBC |
| 2022 (74th) | Sarah Niles | Dr. Sharon Fieldstone | Ted Lasso | "Headspace" | Apple TV+ |
| 2022 (74th) | Juno Temple | Keeley Jones | Ted Lasso | "Midnight Train to Royston" | Apple TV+ |
| 2022 (74th) | Hannah Waddingham | Rebecca Welton | Ted Lasso | "No Weddings and a Funeral" | Apple TV+ |
2023 (75th)
| 2023 (75th) | Ayo Edebiri | Sydney Adamu | The Bear | "Review" | FX |
| 2023 (75th) | Alex Borstein | Susie Myerson | The Marvelous Mrs. Maisel | "The Testi-Roastial" | Prime Video |
| 2023 (75th) | Janelle James | Ava Coleman | Abbott Elementary | "Fundraiser" | ABC |
| 2023 (75th) | Sheryl Lee Ralph | Barbara Howard | Abbott Elementary | "Fire" | ABC |
| 2023 (75th) | Juno Temple | Keeley Jones | Ted Lasso | "We'll Never Have Paris" | Apple TV+ |
| 2023 (75th) | Hannah Waddingham | Rebecca Welton | Ted Lasso | "International Break" | Apple TV+ |
| 2023 (75th) | Jessica Williams | Gaby Evans | Shrinking | "Boop" | Apple TV+ |
2024 (76th)
| 2024 (76th) | Liza Colón-Zayas | Tina Marrero | The Bear | "Pop" | FX |
| 2024 (76th) | Carol Burnett | Norma Dellacorte | Palm Royale | "Maxine Shakes the Tree" | Apple TV+ |
| 2024 (76th) | Hannah Einbinder | Ava Daniels | Hacks | "Bulletproof" | Max |
| 2024 (76th) | Janelle James | Ava Coleman | Abbott Elementary | "Career Day, Part 1" | ABC |
| 2024 (76th) | Sheryl Lee Ralph | Barbara Howard | Abbott Elementary | "Librarian" | ABC |
| 2024 (76th) | Meryl Streep | Loretta Durkin | Only Murders in the Building | "Grab Your Hankies" | Hulu |
2025 (77th)
| 2025 (77th) | Hannah Einbinder | Ava Daniels | Hacks | "Mrs. Table" | HBO Max |
| 2025 (77th) | Liza Colón-Zayas | Tina Marrero | The Bear | "Napkins" | FX |
| 2025 (77th) | Kathryn Hahn | Maya Mason | The Studio | "Casting" | Apple TV+ |
| 2025 (77th) | Janelle James | Ava Coleman | Abbott Elementary | "Music Class" | ABC |
| 2025 (77th) | Catherine O'Hara | Patty Leigh | The Studio | "The Promotion" | Apple TV+ |
| 2025 (77th) | Sheryl Lee Ralph | Barbara Howard | Abbott Elementary | "100th Day of School" | ABC |
| 2025 (77th) | Jessica Williams | Gaby Evans | Shrinking | "Changing Patterns" | Apple TV+ |
2026 (78th)
| 2026 (78th) | Kate O'Flynn | Patricia Moyer | Widow's Bay | "Beach Reads" | Apple TV |
| 2026 (78th) | Dale Dickey | Rosemary | Widow's Bay | "Beach Reads" | Apple TV |
| 2026 (78th) | Hannah Einbinder | Ava Daniels | Hacks | "Hacks" | HBO Max |
| 2026 (78th) | Janelle James | Ava Coleman | Abbott Elementary | "No Homework" | ABC |
| 2026 (78th) | Michelle Pfeiffer | Shyanne Millet | Margo's Got Money Troubles | "Flamingos" | Apple TV |
| 2026 (78th) | Megan Stalter | Kayla Schaefer | Hacks | "QuikScribbl" | HBO Max |
| 2026 (78th) | Jessica Williams | Gaby Evans | Shrinking | "Depression Diet" | Apple TV |

== Superlatives ==
| Superlative | Outstanding Supporting Actress in a Comedy Series |
|---|---|
| Actress with most awards | Rhea Perlman, Doris Roberts (4) |
| Actress with most nominations | Rhea Perlman, Loretta Swit (10) |
| Actress with most nominations without ever winning | Julia Duffy (7) |
| Television program with most wins | Cheers, The Mary Tyler Moore Show (6) |
| Television program with most nominations | Saturday Night Live (21) |
| Actress with most consecutive wins | Valerie Harper, Rhea Perlman, Laurie Metcalf, Doris Roberts (3) |
| First actress with multiple and consecutive wins | Ann B. Davis |

== Programs with multiple wins ==
6 wins

- Cheers (3 consecutive, twice)
- The Mary Tyler Moore Show (consecutive)

4 wins

- Everybody Loves Raymond (3 consecutive)

3 wins

- Roseanne (consecutive)

2 wins

- 3rd Rock from the Sun
- All in the Family
- The Andy Griffith Show
- The Bear (consecutive)
- Bewitched
- The Bob Cummings Show (consecutive)
- Caesar's Hour (consecutive)
- The Marvelous Mrs. Maisel (consecutive)
- M*A*S*H
- Modern Family (consecutive)
- Mom (consecutive)
- Saturday Night Live (consecutive)
- Will & Grace

== Programs with multiple nominations ==
22 nominations

- Saturday Night Live

13 nominations

- Cheers

12 nominations

- The Mary Tyler Moore Show

10 nominations

- M*A*S*H
- Modern Family

9 nominations

- Abbott Elementary
- Sex and the City

8 nominations

- Bewitched
- Friends
- Will & Grace

7 nominations

- Everybody Loves Raymond
- The Golden Girls
- The Marvelous Mrs. Maisel
- Newhart
- Rhoda
- Roseanne
- Seinfeld
- Ted Lasso

6 nominations

- Hacks
- Two and a Half Men
- Veep

5 nominations

- All in the Family
- The Bob Cummings Show
- The Jeffersons
- Murphy Brown
- Transparent

4 nominations

- 30 Rock
- The Big Bang Theory
- Cybill
- I Love Lucy

3 nominations

- 3rd Rock from the Sun
- Alice
- The Bear
- Ben Casey
- Benson
- Caesar's Hour
- The Dick Van Dyke Show
- Glee
- GLOW
- The Jackie Gleason Show
- Mom
- Private Benjamin
- Shrinking
- Ugly Betty
- Weeds

2 nominations

- 227
- The Andy Griffith Show
- Archie Bunker's Place
- Arrest and Trial
- Coach
- The Cosby Show
- Curb Your Enthusiasm
- December Bride
- Desperate Housewives
- Family Ties
- Fleabag
- The George Burns and Gracie Allen Show
- Getting On
- Happy Days
- The John Larroquette Show
- Just Shoot Me!
- The Larry Sanders Show
- Make Room for Daddy
- Mister Peepers
- Night Court
- Nurse Jackie
- Pushing Daisies
- Room 222
- The Studio
- Who's the Boss?
- Widow's Bay
- WKRP in Cincinnati

== Performers with multiple awards ==
4 awards

- Rhea Perlman (3 consecutive)
- Doris Roberts (3 consecutive)

3 awards

- Valerie Harper (consecutive)
- Laurie Metcalf (consecutive)

2 awards

- Alex Borstein (consecutive)
- Julie Bowen (consecutive)
- Ann B. Davis (consecutive)
- Allison Janney (consecutive)
- Kristen Johnston
- Kate McKinnon (consecutive)
- Megan Mullally
- Bebe Neuwirth (consecutive)
- Sally Struthers
- Loretta Swit
- Betty White (consecutive)

== Performers with multiple nominations ==
10 nominations

- Rhea Perlman
- Loretta Swit

9 nominations

- Kate McKinnon

8 nominations

- Megan Mullally

7 nominations

- Julia Duffy
- Estelle Getty
- Julia Louis-Dreyfus
- Doris Roberts

6 nominations

- Julie Bowen
- Anna Chlumsky
- Lisa Kudrow

5 nominations

- Alex Borstein
- Kim Cattrall
- Hannah Einbinder
- Faith Ford
- Marla Gibbs
- Janelle James
- Jane Krakowski
- Marion Lorne
- Laurie Metcalf
- Agnes Moorehead
- Sally Struthers

4 nominations

- Christine Baranski
- Mayim Bialik
- Ann B. Davis
- Valerie Harper
- Julie Kavner
- Audrey Meadows
- Sheryl Lee Ralph
- Holland Taylor
- Vivian Vance
- Sofía Vergara
- Betty White
- Kristen Wiig

3 nominations

- Eileen Brennan
- Betty Gilpin
- Polly Holliday
- Allison Janney
- Kristen Johnston
- Cloris Leachman
- Jane Lynch
- Rose Marie
- Cynthia Nixon
- Elizabeth Perkins
- Inga Swenson
- Juno Temple
- Hannah Waddingham
- Nancy Walker
- Jessica Williams
- Vanessa Williams

2 nominations

- Loni Anderson
- Jennifer Aniston
- Justine Bateman
- Bea Benaderet
- Aidy Bryant
- Pat Carroll
- Kristin Chenoweth
- Liza Colón-Zayas
- Georgia Engel
- Shelley Fabares
- Verna Felton
- Conchata Ferrell
- Janeane Garofalo
- Sara Gilbert
- Jean Hagen
- Kathryn Hahn
- Jackée Harry
- Katherine Helmond
- Cheryl Hines
- Marin Hinkle
- Gaby Hoffmann
- Leslie Jones
- Judith Light
- Wendie Malick
- Anne Meara
- Niecy Nash
- Bebe Neuwirth
- Amy Poehler
- Jaime Pressly
- Marion Ross
- Cecily Strong
- Liz Torres
- Karen Valentine
- Merritt Wever

== See also ==
- Primetime Emmy Award for Outstanding Lead Actor in a Comedy Series
- Primetime Emmy Award for Outstanding Lead Actress in a Comedy Series
- Primetime Emmy Award for Outstanding Supporting Actor in a Comedy Series
- Primetime Emmy Award for Outstanding Lead Actor in a Drama Series
- Primetime Emmy Award for Outstanding Lead Actress in a Drama Series
- Primetime Emmy Award for Outstanding Supporting Actor in a Drama Series
- Primetime Emmy Award for Outstanding Supporting Actress in a Drama Series
- Primetime Emmy Award for Outstanding Lead Actor in a Limited or Anthology Series or Movie
- Primetime Emmy Award for Outstanding Lead Actress in a Limited or Anthology Series or Movie
- Primetime Emmy Award for Outstanding Supporting Actor in a Limited or Anthology Series or Movie
- Primetime Emmy Award for Outstanding Supporting Actress in a Limited or Anthology Series or Movie
- Golden Globe Award for Best Supporting Actress – Series, Miniseries, or Television Film
