= La Locker Room Aux Folles =

- Ted Lasso episode
- Episode no.: Season 3 Episode 9
- Directed by: Erica Dunton
- Written by: Chuck Hayward
- Cinematography by: Vanessa Whyte
- Original release date: May 10, 2023
- Running time: 44 minutes

Guest appearances
- Andrea Anders as Michelle Keller; Annette Badland as Mae; Adam Colborne as Baz; Bronson Webb as Jeremy; Kevin Garry as Paul; Edyta Budnik as Jade

Episode chronology
← Previous "We'll Never Have Paris"	Next → "International Break"

"La Locker Room Aux Folles" is the ninth episode of the third season of the American sports comedy-drama television series Ted Lasso, based on the character played by Jason Sudeikis in a series of promos for NBC Sports' coverage of England's Premier League. It is the 31st overall episode of the series and was written by co-executive producer Chuck Hayward, and directed by Erica Dunton. It was released on Apple TV+ on May 10, 2023.

The series follows Ted Lasso, an American college football coach who is unexpectedly recruited to coach a fictional English Premier League soccer team, AFC Richmond, despite having no experience coaching soccer. The team's owner, Rebecca Welton, hires Lasso hoping he will fail as a means of exacting revenge on the team's previous owner, Rupert, her unfaithful ex-husband. The previous season saw Rebecca work with Ted in saving it, which culminated with their promotion to the Premier League. In the episode, tensions arise between Colin and Isaac after the latter discovers the former's sexuality.

The episode received generally positive reviews from critics, who praised Billy Harris's performance and Colin's storyline, but criticized the episode's writing and Nate's subplot.

== Plot ==
After Isaac (Kola Bokinni) discovers that Colin (Billy Harris) is gay, Colin tries to talk with him, but Isaac constantly ignores or pushes him away. Trent (James Lance) advises Colin to give Isaac time to process everything.

Rebecca (Hannah Waddingham) asks Roy (Brett Goldstein) to run a press conference when Ted (Jason Sudeikis) is unavailable. After Roy skips the press conference, she angrily calls him to her office, telling him that he needs to stop doing only things that are easy for him.

AFC Richmond faces Brighton. The first half ends 1–0 in Brighton's favor, with Isaac chastising Colin for missing a crucial pass. As Richmond leaves the pitch for halftime, a Richmond fan insults the team with a homophobic slur. Isaac angrily jumps into the stands and attacks the fan, and is punished with a red card. In the locker room, the team then deduces that Isaac might be gay, until Colin comes out to the team and receives their support. Roy talks with Isaac, telling him that he must deal with his anger before it eventually consumes him. In the second half, Colin gives his best performance of the season, assisting in a 2–1 win for Richmond.

Roy finally gives a press conference, using an anecdote from his past to explain that, while Richmond does not condone Isaac's actions, Isaac still has his love, since one cannot always know what others are going through.

Meanwhile, Jade (Edyta Budnik) visits Nate (Nick Mohammed) at work and meets Rupert (Anthony Head). Rupert later invites Nate to a "guys' night out" after their game, but when Nate joins Rupert at a bar, he discovers that Rupert has brought two women with him. He excuses himself and leaves the bar to visit Jade.

That night, Isaac explains to Colin that he felt betrayed by Colin's never opening up to him. Colin says he was still scared of the unlikely possibility that Isaac would not support him. Colin decides not to publicly come out, satisfied with being out to the team, and the two friends reconcile.

== Development ==
=== Production ===
The episode was directed by Erica Dunton and written by co-executive producer Chuck Hayward. This was Dunton's fourth directing credit, and Hayward's first writing credit.

== Critical reviews ==
"La Locker Room Aux Folles" received generally positive reviews from critics. The review aggregator website Rotten Tomatoes reported an 89% approval rating for the episode, based on eight reviews.

Manuel Betancourt of The A.V. Club gave the episode a "C" and wrote, "Listen, I don't want to diminish what Ted Lasso accomplishes with this episode. At a time when professional athletes (and footballers, in particular) still struggle with living their lives out and proud, there's a good argument to be made about needing stories like Colin out in the world. And yet, the didacticism of it all felt so, well, flat to me (like the locker room conversations about nudes from last week) that I couldn't help but snicker when we learn suddenly Colin becomes an even better player, praised by team, press, and coaches alike."

Keith Phipps of Vulture gave the episode a 2 star rating out of 5 and wrote, "It's one thing to have the whole team take a stand against racism, which makes sense. But it's another when an episode suggests two characters have a fundamental difference they'll never be able to resolve tied to one of the character's prejudices only to, oops, reveal it as a mere instance of hurt feelings all along. 'La Locker Room aux Folles' takes on some not-nice-at-all real-world problems only to wave them away while confirming the Greyhounds as a bubble where niceness smothers out any bursts of unpleasantness. It's, as usual, well played with plenty of witty moments. But it ultimately feels mushy as oatmeal." Paul Dailly of TV Fanatic gave the episode a 3.25 star rating out of 5 and wrote, "Ted Lasso Season 3 is supposed to be the show's final season, so it's disconcerting that many storylines are moving in circles instead of forward, but the show did very well by Colin here."

Christopher Orr of The New York Times wrote, "For anyone doubting the adage that less is sometimes more, I offer the example of this episode of Ted Lasso. While it's not what I would describe as remarkable, or even especially memorable, it has a nice rhythm to it, in part because it tackles fewer unrelated story lines. The aggressive jumps from subplot to subplot, many involving new or peripheral characters are less in evidence — Keeley's professional and romantic dalliances with, respectively, Shandy and Jack, had been particular offenders — and their absence is a welcome break." Fletcher Peters of The Daily Beast wrote, "Because we see the characters taking over Ted's roles, this episode is one of the most streamlined of the season. It feels like one of the best of Season 3 so far, more reminiscent of the best installments of Seasons 1 and 2."
