= Sunflowers (Ted Lasso) =

- Ted Lasso episode
- Episode no.: Season 3 Episode 6
- Directed by: Matt Lipsey
- Story by: Joe Kelly; Jason Sudeikis
- Teleplay by: Brendan Hunt
- Cinematography by: David Rom
- Editing by: Melissa McCoy; Francesca Castro
- Original release date: April 19, 2023
- Running time: 63 minutes

Guest appearances
- Matteo van der Grijn as Stranger; Ellie Taylor as Flo "Sassy" Collins; Corey Burton as The True Spirit of Adventure

Episode chronology
| ← Previous "Signs" | Next → "The Strings That Bind Us" |

"Sunflowers" is the sixth episode of the third season of the American sports comedy-drama television series Ted Lasso, based on the character played by Jason Sudeikis in a series of promos for NBC Sports' coverage of England's Premier League. It is the 28th overall episode of the series and was written by cast member Brendan Hunt from a story by executive producer Joe Kelly and lead actor Jason Sudeikis, and directed by supervising producer Matt Lipsey. It was released on Apple TV+ on April 19, 2023.

The series follows Ted Lasso, an American college football coach who is unexpectedly recruited to coach a fictional English Premier League soccer team, AFC Richmond, despite having no experience coaching soccer. The team's owner, Rebecca Welton, hires Lasso hoping he will fail as a means of exacting revenge on the team's previous owner, Rupert, her unfaithful ex-husband. The previous season saw Rebecca work with Ted in saving it, which culminated with their promotion to the Premier League. In the episode, Ted decides to give the club a night out in Amsterdam to lift their spirits.

The episode received generally positive reviews from critics, who praised the performances and character development, although some still criticized the disjointed storylines, runtime and lack of progress.

== Plot ==
AFC Richmond loses 5–0 during a friendly game to AFC Ajax in Amsterdam. Rebecca (Hannah Waddingham) is annoyed by the Ajax supporters happily singing the club's anthem, "Three Little Birds" by Bob Marley and the Wailers. Ted (Jason Sudeikis) tries to lift the club's spirits by announcing no curfew that night.

Roy (Brett Goldstein) forbids Jamie (Phil Dunster) from taking the night off and takes him for training through Amsterdam, but is annoyed by Jamie's enthusiastic attitude and knowledge of the city. When Roy mentions that he's never seen a windmill, Jamie buys stolen bicycles so they can go to see one; but Roy confesses that he never learned to ride a bike. Jamie teaches him, and although Roy struggles at first, the two eventually ride to the outskirts of the city and see a windmill.

Rebecca wants to spend time with Keeley (Juno Temple), but she leaves to see the aurora borealis with her girlfriend Jack in Norway. While walking in a bike lane, Rebecca is knocked off a bridge and falls into a canal. An onlooker (Matteo van der Grijn) invites her onto his houseboat so she can shower and change her clothes. He cooks her dinner, they bond over deep conversations, and she falls asleep on his couch. Higgins (Jeremy Swift) takes Will (Charlie Hiscock) to a jazz club to pay respects to Chet Baker. Will is delighted by the music and is also surprised by Higgins' skills when he is invited to join the band onstage.

The team discusses what to do for their free night: some want to go to a sex show, while others want to attend a private party where Jan Maas’ (David Elsendoorn) cousin Martin Garrix is performing in Groningen, two hours' drive away. After a lengthy, inconclusive and angry debate, they hold a pillow fight at the hotel. During this time, Colin (Billy Harris) heads to a gay bar and is followed by Trent (James Lance). Colin panics and leaves, but Trent assures him that he has known Colin is gay for months. He tells Colin about his own experience coming out to his family. Colin says that he wants to be able to kiss his boyfriend when he wins a match and not worry about it.

Beard (Brendan Hunt) offers to help Ted get out of his rut by sharing drugs with him, but Ted is unwilling to drink the drugged tea until after Beard has left. He visits the Van Gogh Museum, where Van Gogh's paintings of sunflowers remind him of his home state of Kansas.

While watching a recording of an old Chicago Bulls game at an American-style theme restaurant, Ted is offered a bottle of Arthur Bryant's barbecue sauce, after which he begins to experience hallucinations inspired by Tex Winter's use of the triangle offense, leading him to devise a new football strategy.

The next morning, the club is ready to leave Amsterdam. Ted shows Beard his new tactic, which involves the players being prepared to take any position in the field. Beard notes that this strategy, Total Football, was first developed in Amsterdam in the 1970s but agrees that the team should adopt it. All in high spirits, the rest of the club and Rebecca board the bus, which drives off as the club collectively sings "Three Little Birds".

== Development ==
=== Production ===
The episode was directed by supervising producer Matt Lipsey and written by cast member Brendan Hunt from a story by executive producer Joe Kelly and lead actor Jason Sudeikis. This was Lipsey's fourth directing credit, Hunt's sixth writing credit, Kelly's eighth writing credit, and Sudeikis's sixth writing credit for the show.

=== Writing ===
The basis for the episode originated from Hunt's experiences while living in Amsterdam. As Beard's storyline was the last one to be considered, Hunt decided to omit it entirely from the episode.

Commenting on Colin's storyline, actor Billy Harris explained, "Trent is probably the first person in sports that he's had that kind of conversation with. And also, he's a journalist. I think that that's so brave of Colin to go, 'OK, I trust you. I trust what you're saying. I have a lot on my plate. I have a lot on my mind. Please can you listen?' And Trent does that. He does a fantastic job of just giving Colin the space to tell his truth."

== Critical reviews ==
"Sunflowers" received generally positive reviews from critics. The review aggregator website Rotten Tomatoes reported a 100% approval rating for the episode, based on seven reviews.

Manuel Betancourt of The A.V. Club gave the episode a "B–" and wrote, "Clocking in past the hour mark, 'Sunflowers' captures both what makes the show great, yes — but also exactly why it's struggling in this final season as it caters to its own worst instincts. What began as a true ensemble comedy has slowly morphed into a series of disconnected storylines that only intermittently intersect, and 'Sunflowers' shows us why such an approach is producing diminishing returns."

Keith Phipps of Vulture gave the episode a 4 star rating out of 5 and wrote, "We're now officially halfway through this season of Ted Lasso, so the aerial of this change-of-pace episode makes sense. By design or not, it also shakes up the season in a way that opens up possibilities for what's to come." Paul Dailly of TV Fanatic gave the episode a 3.75 star rating out of 5 and wrote, "A trip to Amsterdam could have brought all the characters together, but thanks to the scattered nature of Ted Lasso Season 3, it was more of the same. 'Sunflowers' excelled in many areas, but keeping many characters apart as they search for meaning is beginning to stretch very thin."

Christopher Orr of The New York Times wrote, "This was for me an odd and largely dissatisfying episode in addition to being, at over an hour, the longest episode to date. It felt an awful lot like the 'bottle episodes' added to the run late last season: 'Carol of the Bells' and 'Beard After Hours'. It is not, however, a bottle episode, as two characters' story lines move notably forward; it's just an episode that, apart from those characters, goes essentially nowhere. And did I mention it was really long?" Fletcher Peters of The Daily Beast wrote, "Apart from this bizarre drug storyline, 'Sunflowers' is actually one of the better episodes of the season thus far."

=== Accolades ===
TVLine named Hannah Waddingham as an honorable mention as the "Performer of the Week" for the week of April 22, 2023, for her performance in the episode. The site wrote, "The last time we honored Ted Lasso's Hannah Waddingham, she went big. Like, 'sing Rick Astley at your father's funeral' big. This time around, the actress who brings our favorite #BossAssBitch to life caught our eye because of just how effortlessly charming she was throughout Rebecca's dreamy, romantic interlude in Amsterdam. We'd never seen Rebecca this relaxed... this carefree... this unburdened by the world around her. Take, for instance, when she first broke out into song. Waddingham imbued each and every Kenny Rogers lyric with a sense of unbridled joy. Rebecca wasn't worried about what her mystery man thought of her singing. For the first time in a long time, she was just having fun — and Waddingham made you feel that. Our absolute favorite moment, though, came the morning after, when Rebecca got back on the bus. The way she sank into her seat and kicked her feet up on the table told us all we needed to know. Her breezy, soulful rendition of 'Three Little Birds' was the cherry on top of an already sublime showcase."
