= The Strings That Bind Us =

- Ted Lasso episode
- Episode no.: Season 3 Episode 7
- Directed by: Matt Lipsey
- Written by: Phoebe Walsh
- Cinematography by: David Rom
- Editing by: A.J. Catoline
- Original release date: April 26, 2023
- Running time: 57 minutes

Guest appearances
- Nonso Anozie as Ola Obisanya; Annette Badland as Mae; Adam Colborne as Baz; Bronson Webb as Jeremy; Kevin Garry as Paul; Katy Wix as Barbara; Edyta Budnik as Jade; Jodi Balfour as Jack Danvers

Episode chronology
← Previous "Sunflowers"	Next → "We'll Never Have Paris"

"The Strings That Bind Us" is the seventh episode of the third season of the American sports comedy-drama television series Ted Lasso, based on the character played by Jason Sudeikis in a series of promos for NBC Sports' coverage of England's Premier League. It is the 29th overall episode of the series and was written by producer Phoebe Walsh, and directed by supervising producer Matt Lipsey. It was released on Apple TV+ on April 26, 2023.

The series follows Ted Lasso, an American college football coach who is unexpectedly recruited to coach a fictional English Premier League soccer team, AFC Richmond, despite having no experience coaching soccer. The team's owner, Rebecca Welton, hires Lasso hoping he will fail as a means of exacting revenge on the team's previous owner, Rupert, her unfaithful ex-husband. The previous season saw Rebecca work with Ted in saving it, which culminated with their promotion to the Premier League. In the episode, AFC Richmond starts using the Total Football tactic, to mixed results. Meanwhile, Sam's father is visiting him, while Keeley discloses her relationship with Jack.

The episode received generally positive reviews from critics, who praised the performances and the series' return to its training sequences, but criticized the episode's runtime, disjointed storylines and Keeley's and Nate's subplots.

== Plot ==
Ted (Jason Sudeikis) gets Beard (Brendan Hunt) and Roy (Brett Goldstein) to explain their Total Football tactic to AFC Richmond.

Jack (Jodi Balfour) gives Keeley (Juno Temple) a first edition of Sense and Sensibility signed by Jane Austen. Barbara remarks on the impropriety of Keeley receiving such a valuable gift from her "boss". When Keeley expresses her concerns to Jack, Jack announces to the entire office that they are dating. The evening at a restaurant, Rebecca compares Jack's extravagant gifts with the "love-bombing" techniques Rupert used early in their relationship; on their second date Rupert bought her an expensive car. Keeley claims everything is fine but is then notified that Jack has paid for their meal.

Sam (Toheeb Jimoh) is delighted to hear that his father (Nonso Anozie) will be visiting. Before his arrival, he finds that Home Secretary Brinda Barot plans to bar refugees from entering Britain. Sam politely criticizes her decisions on Twitter, and Barot replies by telling him to "shut up and dribble", prompting Sam to refer to her as a "world-class bigot". Meanwhile, Nate (Nick Mohammed) wants to ask Jade (Edyta Budnik) out on a date but is worried that she could reject him. His mother and sister encourage him to ask her, so he makes a gift box for Jade. But he trips when crossing the street, and a car runs over the gift. Nate then simply asks her out, and she accepts.

To teach the team versatility, Ted makes the players swap positions during training; Jamie (Phil Dunster) is the only one to play his usual position. The tactic has mixed results, and Trent (James Lance) is unconvinced that it will pay off, but Ted maintains his optimism. The next day, they use a tactic devised by Roy to teach the team to pay attention to each other's positions on the pitch: the players are connected to each other with strings tied to their penises.

A day before their game against Arsenal, Sam finds that his restaurant has been vandalized by Barot's supporters. He has an emotional breakdown in the locker room, but his father, Ola, arrives and comforts him. Sam does not want to show Ola his wrecked restaurant, but Ola insists on seeing it after their game. On game day, the first half ends with a 3–0 lead for Arsenal, and the pundits are confused by Richmond's tactics. In the locker room, Jamie suggests to the team that instead of playing "to" him, they should play "through" him. During the second half, they score an elegant goal using the Total Football approach. While the game still ends in a 3–1 win for Arsenal, Richmond's reputation drastically improves. Trent observes that Ted's supportive coaching style over the past three seasons has been instrumental in teaching the team to trust and support each other.

Keeley tells Jack that she loves her but wants their relationship to be on equal terms; she later treats Jack to dinner at A Taste of Athens. Nate and Jade finally go on a date. Sam takes Ola to see his restaurant and finds that the team has been cleaning and repairing it. Sam decides to keep the broken mirrors, as a reminder that "everything does not have to be perfect." Ola, touched upon seeing that Sam named the restaurant after him, cooks dinner with Sam for the rest of the team.

== Development ==
=== Production ===
The episode was directed by supervising producer Matt Lipsey and written by producer Phoebe Walsh. This was Lipsey's fifth directing credit, and Walsh's third writing credit.

== Critical reviews ==
"The Strings That Bind Us" received generally positive reviews from critics. The review aggregator website Rotten Tomatoes reported a 75% approval rating for the episode, based on eight reviews.

Manuel Betancourt of The A.V. Club gave the episode a "C+" and wrote, "In a way, this was a close-to-perfect season-one episode about Ted coaching the team in an unorthodox way that made its players embrace their own senses of community and humanity (also, it was all about soccer!), But it needlessly had to jockey for attention with Keeley and Jack's 'love bombing' deal, Nate's protracted date with his favorite hostess, and even with Sam's Twitter feud with a U.K. politician intent on keeping immigrants out of the country. As with almost every other episode this season, there was little cohesion to these various storylines."

Alan Sepinwall of Rolling Stone criticized Nate's storyline, writing, "it sure feels as if the writers are expecting Nate's romantic adventures to make us sympathize with him again — rather than, you know, having him actually make significant amends for all the people he treated like garbage before he quit Richmond to coach West Ham. It's possible that some of this is coming in the home stretch. But if so, it's going to feel awfully rushed, and make you wonder why a season where many of the episodes are coming in at an hour long couldn't find the time to properly work up to this, rather than assuming that if Nate can win the heart of the girl who initially didn't like him, then he obviously deserves to win back our hearts, too."

Keith Phipps of Vulture gave the episode a 4 star rating out of 5 and wrote, "It's easy to resolve to change your life when on vacation and away from the everyday routine. Seeing those changes through, on the other hand, can be tricky. Where the previous episode, 'Sunflowers', found the Greyhounds and their entourage come to realizations about what they wanted out of life, episode seven, 'The Strings That Bind Us', depicts the sometimes tricky process of turning those realizations into action. It also introduces some new problems, specifically for Sam, and a sadistic new practice technique that almost seems designed to invite lawsuits (but, this being Ted Lasso, almost certainly will not)." Paul Dailly of TV Fanatic gave the episode a 2.75 star rating out of 5 and wrote, "The episode continued to juggle more storylines than the series should be handling, and because of the lack of connective tissue between them, it was another disjointed hour. Embracing longer run times shouldn't be detrimental to the story, but 'The Strings That Bind' might be the most self-indulgent hour of Ted Lasso yet."

Christopher Orr of The New York Times wrote, "The first practice, on 'conditioning', is fine. Ditto the second one, on 'versatility', although no matter how 'total' Total Football may be, it does not involve swapping out your goalkeeper, especially not in favor of the team's shortest player. But the 'awareness' practice in which the players used red string to tie themselves to one another's man parts? Count me out. Humor this broad has never been a strong suit for Ted Lasso." Fletcher Peters of The Daily Beast wrote, "Luckily, in Season 3 of Ted Lasso, nothing has changed about Rebecca and Keeley’s friendship. They still check in on one another constantly. No one can deny their commitment to one another as companions. But they've run out of things to talk about other than their love lives, a sign of weak writing for these otherwise strong female characters."

=== Accolades ===
TVLine named Toheeb Jimoh as an honorable mention as the "Performer of the Week" for the week of April 29, 2023, for his performance in the episode. The site wrote, "Ted Lasso's Sam Obisanya always tries to see the best in people. Heck, in this week's episode, the midfielder attempted to give a racist politician the benefit of the doubt. But once he discovered his restaurant in ruins, Sam could no longer ignore the hatred that fueled this act of vandalism. What followed was a brief but visceral outburst that offered Toheeb Jimoh a chance to show off his dramatic chops — and boy did he deliver. Sam's anger was reflected in Jimoh's body language; his shoulders remained stiff even as the rest of his body vibrated with rage. And the way his voice cracked as Sam pointed out that the same people who love him for scoring goals would 'ship me back to wherever the f–k I came from' if he stopped winning matches was especially effective."
