= Mom City =

- Ted Lasso episode
- Episode no.: Season 3 Episode 11
- Directed by: Declan Lowney
- Story by: Brendan Hunt; Jason Sudeikis
- Teleplay by: Joe Kelly
- Cinematography by: Vanessa Whyte
- Editing by: A.J. Catoline; Alex Szabo
- Original release date: May 24, 2023
- Running time: 69 minutes

Guest appearances
- Annette Badland as Mae; Adam Colborne as Baz; Bronson Webb as Jeremy; Kevin Garry as Paul; Katy Wix as Barbara; Edyta Budnik as Jade; Kieran O'Brien as James Tartt; Leanne Best as Georgie Tartt; Becky Ann Baker as Dottie Lasso; Pep Guardiola as himself

Episode chronology
← Previous "International Break"	Next → "So Long, Farewell"

"Mom City" is the eleventh episode of the third season of the American sports comedy-drama television series Ted Lasso, based on the character played by Jason Sudeikis in a series of promos for NBC Sports' coverage of England's Premier League. It is the 33rd overall episode of the series and was written by series co-creator Joe Kelly from a story by co-creators and main stars Brendan Hunt and Jason Sudeikis, and directed by Declan Lowney. It was released on Apple TV+ on May 24, 2023.

The series follows Ted Lasso, an American college football coach who is unexpectedly recruited to coach a fictional English Premier League soccer team, AFC Richmond, despite having no experience coaching soccer. The team's owner, Rebecca Welton, hires Lasso hoping he will fail as a means of exacting revenge on the team's previous owner, Rupert, her unfaithful ex-husband. The previous season saw Rebecca work with Ted in saving it, which culminated with their promotion to the Premier League. In the episode, AFC Richmond is nearing the end of the season and prepares to face Manchester City F.C., while Jamie experiences pressure.

The episode received generally positive reviews from critics, who praised the performances and emotional tone. The resolution of Nate's arc, however, divided critics; many felt it was genuine, while others deemed it rushed and unconvincing. Additionally, at the 75th Primetime Emmy Awards, Phil Dunster and Becky Ann Baker each received a nomination for their performances in the episode, the former for Outstanding Supporting Actor in Comedy Series, while the latter for Outstanding Guest Actress in a Comedy Series.

== Plot ==
Ted (Jason Sudeikis) receives an unexpected visit from his mother, Dottie (Becky Ann Baker). Although Ted is uncomfortable with her presence, Dottie charms the AFC Richmond players and Ted's other friends.

Nate (Nick Mohammed) is now working with Jade (Edyta Budnik) at Taste of Athens. Isaac (Kola Bokinni), Colin (Billy Harris) and Will (Charlie Hiscock) ask him to return to coaching at Richmond. Nate declines when he learns Ted was not part of the decision to ask him back. When Higgins (Jeremy Swift) mentions the possibility to the coaches, Roy is for it, but Beard (Brendan Hunt) voices his opposition. Later, Jade blackmails their boss into firing Nate to motivate him to return to football.

Richmond has been riding a 15-game winning streak, and a victory in their upcoming match against Manchester City will put them in contention to win the Premier League. Despite his success with Richmond, Jamie (Phil Dunster), who once played for City, has been suffering from depression. After the team arrive in Manchester, Jamie visits his mother Georgie (Leanne Best). He confides in her that he feels nervous about the negative reception he faces from City fans—including his abusive father, James (Kieran O'Brien). Georgie consoles him, telling him he has nothing to prove to James.

During the match, Manchester City fans heckle Jamie. Despite this, he assists Colin in scoring a goal. Late in the game, he injures his ankle preventing a City goal. Rather than replacing him, Ted waits for Jamie to recover, forcing Richmond to play with just 10 players. Ted's suggestion that Jamie forgive his father motivates Jamie to return to the game. He scores a goal in the final minutes, clinching Richmond's 2–0 victory and earning the applause of the local audience, including James, who is watching the game from a rehab facility.

Back in London, Ted asks Beard to give Nate a second chance. Beard visits Nate, who is in the process of writing an apology letter to Ted, and reveals his history with Ted. They became friends on their college football team, but Beard later went to prison for stealing meth. After his release, Beard looked up Ted who took him in, but Beard stole Ted's car. Ted saved him from returning to prison by telling the police that he had loaned him the car. As Ted forgave him and gave him a second chance, Beard forgives Nate and offers him his job back.

Ted confronts his mother over her not seeking emotional support for herself or Ted after his father's suicide. Dottie apologizes, tells him she didn't know what else to do and that she came to tell him that his son misses him. Meanwhile, Rebecca (Hannah Waddingham) is visited by Bex (Keeley Hazell) and Rupert's assistant Ms. Kakes, asking for advice. The next morning, Ted tells Rebecca he has his own "truth bomb" to reveal.

== Development ==
=== Production ===
The episode was directed by Declan Lowney and written by series co-creator Joe Kelly from a story by co-creators and main stars Brendan Hunt and Jason Sudeikis. This was Lowney's seventh directing credit, Kelly's ninth writing credit, Hunt's seventh writing credit, and Sudeikis' seventh writing credit.

=== Casting ===
The episode featured an appearance by Pep Guardiola, Manchester City F.C.'s real-life coach, playing himself.

== Reception ==
=== Critical response ===
"Mom City" received generally positive reviews from critics. The review aggregator website Rotten Tomatoes reported an 88% approval rating for the episode, based on eight reviews.

Manuel Betancourt of The A.V. Club gave the episode a "B" and wrote, "'Mom City' has bits and pieces of a killer Ted Lasso episode. But it has just as many of its many foibles. As a penultimate episode, it works perfectly to begin tying up many of its season-long (if not outright series-long) arcs all the while setting up what may be on the horizon in next week's finale episode." Betancourt also noted several references to The Wizard of Oz in the episode, suggesting they allude to Ted's desire to return home. Rick Porter of The Hollywood Reporter was not convinced of Nate's arc, but praised Beard's conversation, "an effective enough speech to patch over some of the missing pieces in Nate's arc."

Keith Phipps of Vulture gave the episode a 3 star rating out of 5 and wrote, "Beard's learned the importance of forgiveness firsthand and offers it to Nate, who accepts it, and a job. One gentle head-butt later, they're friends again. And with that, Ted Lasso is positioned to bring the season (both the football season and this season of television) to an end." Paul Dailly of TV Fanatic gave the episode a perfect 5 star rating out of 5 and wrote, "It's no secret that I've struggled with the longer episodes this season, but 'Mom City' didn't waste a single minute. It was a perfect episode of TV and might be my favorite episode of the series."

Christopher Orr of The New York Times wrote, "When 'Man City' came out last season, it was the longest Lasso episode to date, at 45 minutes. 'Mom City' puts that number to shame, clocking in at one hour and nine minutes (the show's latest longest run time). Yet in contrast to several episodes this season, the extended length is spent not hopping among unrelated subplots but developing a relatively uniform theme." Fletcher Peters of The Daily Beast wrote, "'Mom City' feels like far from the second-to-last episode of a beloved show, devoid of any grand gestures or character departures. In fact, it's quite the opposite: This episode proves that Ted Lasso can and should carry on without Ted. It's just the beginning for Roy, Nate (though the writers have a lot to work on with him), Rebecca, and Jamie in a post-Ted landscape." Meghan O'Keefe of Decider wrote, "The divinely kind Ted Lasso might have the grace to forgive Nate his sins, but Ted Lasso didn't quite do enough to redeem him in the eyes of us crabby viewers at home."

=== Accolades ===
"Mom City" was chosen by Dunster to support his Primetime Emmy Award nomination for Outstanding Supporting Actor in a Comedy Series. Additionally, Becky Ann Baker was nominated for Outstanding Guest Actress in a Comedy Series for her performance in the episode.

Award	Category	Recipient(s)	Result	Ref.
Hollywood Music in Media Awards	Best Original Song – TV Show/Limited Series	"Fought & Lost" (Written by Jamie Hartman, Sam Ryder, and Tom Howe; Performed by Sam Ryder)	Won	
Primetime Creative Arts Emmy Awards	Outstanding Guest Actress in a Comedy Series	Becky Ann Baker	Nominated	
Primetime Creative Arts Emmy Awards	Outstanding Original Music and Lyrics	"Fought & Lost" (Tom Howe, Jamie Hartman, and Sam Ryder)	Nominated	
Primetime Creative Arts Emmy Awards	Outstanding Picture Editing for a Single-Camera Comedy Series	A.J. Catoline and Alex Szabo	Nominated	
Primetime Creative Arts Emmy Awards	Outstanding Special Visual Effects in a Single Episode	James MacLachlan, Bill Parker, Lenny Wilson, Gretchen Bangs, Brian Hobert, Shiying Li, Kenneth Armstrong, Ying Lin, and Neil Taylor	Nominated	
Visual Effects Society Awards	Outstanding Supporting Visual Effects in a Photoreal Episode	Gretchen Bangs, Bill Parker, Lenny Wilson, and James MacLachlan	Nominated	
