= Headspace (Ted Lasso) =

- Ted Lasso episode
- Episode no.: Season 2 Episode 7
- Directed by: Matt Lipsey
- Written by: Phoebe Walsh
- Cinematography by: Vanessa Whyte
- Editing by: Melissa McCoy
- Original release date: September 3, 2021
- Running time: 35 minutes

Guest appearances
- Toheeb Jimoh as Sam Obisanya; Cristo Fernández as Dani Rojas; Kola Bokinni as Isaac McAdoo; Annette Badland as Mae; James Lance as Trent Crimm

Episode chronology
← Previous "The Signal"	Next → "Man City"

"Headspace" is the seventh episode of the second season of the American sports comedy-drama television series Ted Lasso, based on the character played by Jason Sudeikis in a series of promos for NBC Sports' coverage of England's Premier League. It is the 17th overall episode of the series and was written by Phoebe Walsh and directed by Matt Lipsey. It was released on Apple TV+ on September 3, 2021.

The series follows Ted Lasso, an American college football coach, who is unexpectedly recruited to coach a fictional English Premier League soccer team, AFC Richmond, despite having no experience coaching soccer. The team's owner, Rebecca Welton, hires Lasso hoping he will fail as a means of exacting revenge on the team's previous owner, Rupert, her unfaithful ex-husband. The previous season saw Rebecca change her mind on the club's direction and working Ted in saving it, although the club is relegated from the Premier League. In the episode, Ted starts therapy sessions with Sharon, but his lack of commitment proves to be frustrating. Meanwhile, Beard notes a new behavior on Nate while Roy tries to spend every moment with Keeley.

The episode received positive reviews, with critics praising the performances, therapy scenes, writing and character development. Nate's behavior was analyzed by many critics. For her performance in the episode, Sarah Niles was nominated for Outstanding Supporting Actress in a Comedy Series at the 74th Primetime Emmy Awards.

== Plot ==
Ted (Jason Sudeikis) starts therapy sessions with Sharon (Sarah Niles), although his reluctance to open up makes it difficult, and his disrespect for psychiatry disappoints her. Meanwhile, Roy (Brett Goldstein) begins to spend all his free time with Keeley (Juno Temple), who is becoming uncomfortable with his constant presence.

Nate (Nick Mohammed) is delighted with the media's praise for his role in the team's victory. However, he is disappointed when his father downplays his role, once again making him feel insecure. This prompts him to act rudely to some of the crew, particularly Colin (Billy Harris), a player who previously mocked him, and Will (Charlie Hiscock), the new kit man. The latter is witnessed by Beard (Brendan Hunt), who becomes concerned about Nate.

Having been advised by Rebecca (Hannah Waddingham), Ted and Higgins (Jeremy Swift), Keeley tries to discourage Roy from spending every minute with her. However, when Roy reads and comments on The Da Vinci Code while she's trying to watch Sex and the City, Keeley finally tells him that she needs some space, revealing she talked with others about him. An angered Roy storms out, and Keeley dissolves into tears.

During another therapy session, Ted apologizes for mocking Sharon's profession, intending to open up more. After Beard calls out Nate for his behavior, Nate apologizes before the team for his comments to Colin and is forgiven by the club. Ted is unaware of what he did. While leading a training session, Roy admonishes Jamie (Phil Dunster) for not supporting a teammate by staying close to him, but Jamie says he needed to give his teammate space. Roy interprets that as applying to him and Keeley. That night, Roy tells Keeley that he understands her frustration and runs her a candlelit rose bath to enjoy all by herself.

Also that night, Ted encounters Trent Crimm (James Lance) at the pub, who asks for a statement on his exit from the game. Ted continues claiming it was food poisoning. In his office, Nate happily scrolls through tweets that praise him. He then runs into a tweet that calls him a loser despite winning. Hurt, Nate once again is cruel to Will, throwing down the special "Wonder Kid" jersey Will inspired the team to give him.

== Development ==
=== Production ===
The episode was directed by Matt Lipsey and written by Phoebe Walsh. This was Lipsey's first directing credit, and Walsh's second writing credit for the show.

== Critical reviews ==
"Headspace" received positive reviews from critics. Myles McNutt of The A.V. Club gave the episode a "B+" and wrote, "This might mean that a character like Nate starts to fall in our estimation, but that's a natural extension of what we knew about the character thus far, and despite my initial reservations has evolved into a rich vein of storytelling for the back half of the season."

Alan Sepinwall of Rolling Stone wrote, "If 'Headspace' was lighter than 'The Signal', it also makes clear throughout that all is not nearly as well for the nice people of AFC Richmond going into the home stretch of Season Two as they would like to believe."

Keith Phipps of Vulture gave the episode a 4 star rating out of 5 and wrote, "Much of 'Headspace' leaves viewers hanging about the fate of its plot strands. Will Ted be able to confront what's going on inside him? Will Nate continue his descent into prickdom? Is there a future to this Bantr match? All that, and the Greyhounds' season remains on the line, even if the episode largely ignores that. Football is life, sure, but there's more to life than just football." Becca Newton of TV Fanatic gave the episode a 4.4 star rating out of 5 and wrote, "With Nate's behavior becoming more problematic as he receives outside praise, including the possibility of outside offers to manage a team, it begs the question of how dark Nate's story will go. Is he Ted Lasso's Anakin Skywalker?"

Linda Holmes of NPR wrote, "Nate has never really felt like he had power, either in his family or at work or probably anywhere else, and he has no idea what it's supposed to look like. It seems like there's some stuff going on with him that maybe hasn't entirely been explored, but at the very least, he's pointing his anger in the wrong direction. It's especially unsettling that he's so insistent that he didn't bungle the name 'Wonder Kid', when he did. You never like to see a guy commit to something that's not true." Christopher Orr of The New York Times wrote, "At last: A clear vision of the trajectory of this season — hinted at last week — has come into focus. It's not about wins and losses. We still have no idea of AFC Richmond's chances of rejoining the Premier League. We don't even know their next opponent in the FA Cup, following last week's shocking upset of Tottenham Hotspur. What we do know is a little bit more about Ted and the journey he appears to be on this season."

=== Awards and accolades ===
Sarah Niles submitted this episode for consideration for her Primetime Emmy Award for Outstanding Supporting Actress in a Comedy Series nomination at the 74th Primetime Emmy Awards. She lost the award to Sheryl Lee Ralph in Abbott Elementary.
