= Signs (Ted Lasso) =

- Ted Lasso episode
- Episode no.: Season 3 Episode 5
- Directed by: Matt Lipsey
- Written by: Jamie Lee
- Cinematography by: David Rom
- Editing by: A.J. Catoline; Alex Szabo
- Original release date: April 12, 2023
- Running time: 49 minutes

Guest appearances
- Andrea Anders as Michelle Lasso; Annette Badland as Mae; Adam Colborne as Baz; Bronson Webb as Jeremy; Kevin Garry as Paul; Katy Wix as Barbara; Maximilian Osinski as Zava; Ambreen Razia as Shandy Fine; Edyta Budnik as Jade; Jodi Balfour as Jack Danvers; Patrick Baladi as John

Episode chronology
← Previous "Big Week"	Next → "Sunflowers"

"Signs" is the fifth episode of the third season of the American sports comedy-drama television series Ted Lasso, based on the character played by Jason Sudeikis in a series of promos for NBC Sports' coverage of England's Premier League. It is the 27th overall episode of the series and was written by executive producer Jamie Lee and directed by supervising producer Matt Lipsey. It was released on Apple TV+ on April 12, 2023.

The series follows Ted Lasso, an American college football coach who is unexpectedly recruited to coach a fictional English Premier League soccer team, AFC Richmond, despite having no experience coaching soccer. The team's owner, Rebecca Welton, hires Lasso hoping he will fail as a means of exacting revenge on the team's previous owner, Rupert, her unfaithful ex-husband. The previous season saw Rebecca work with Ted in saving it, which culminated with their promotion to the Premier League. In the episode, Ted faces a dilemma with his son, while Rebecca looks for a possible life change.

The episode received mixed reviews from critics, who praised the performances and humor but criticized the episode's pacing, underdeveloped stories, and Keeley's and Rebecca's subplots.

== Plot ==
AFC Richmond loses 4–2 to Newcastle United, which makes it its seventh straight week without winning. The coaching staff is unable to fully settle on what to do.

At a café, Rebecca (Hannah Waddingham) finds her ex-boyfriend John (Patrick Baladi) (Note: Previously seen in Goodbye Earl.) is now engaged to another woman, and Rebecca is taken aback when she repeats a phrase that was in one of Tish's predictions. Meanwhile, while Keeley (Juno Temple) and Jack (Jodi Balfour) have a meeting, Shandy (Ambreen Razia) announces that she is developing a new app to help users to have sex with celebrities. After she leaves, Jack encourages Keeley to fire Shandy, which Keeley is unwilling to do.

Ted (Jason Sudeikis) learns that Henry was involved in a bullying incident and talks with Michelle that night to know the details, only to find Henry himself was the bully. Meanwhile, Keeley decides to finally fire Shandy, after learning her antics cost the firm a client. Shandy angrily storms out.

Before Richmond's next match against Manchester City, Rebecca visits a fertility clinic to know her chances of ever getting pregnant and is promised the results after the game. After discovering that Shandy left a lamb that defecated all over a conference room, Keeley and Jack are forced to stay at the office to clean up. Nate (Nick Mohammed) takes his shallow model date to his favorite restaurant, but she looks down on the ambiance and insults the food. With the Manchester game about to start, Zava (Maximilian Osinski) is nowhere to be found. The club is forced to use Colin (Billy Harris) in Zava's place, confusing the pundits. The game ends in a heavy 4–0 loss for Richmond, damaging the public's faith in the team.

After the game, Rebecca receives a call from the clinic and is disappointed in her result. She calls Keeley, who does not answer since she is spending the night with Jack at her office, the two having bonded after cleaning up the lamb feces together. On an impulse, Keeley kisses Jack, who reciprocates. Back at the restaurant, hostess Jade (Edyta Budnik) brings two baklava servings that Nate ordered and discovers that his date left him. He jokingly invites her to eat them with him, which she actually accepts. Ted has a call with Henry and is reassured when he says he already made up with the student at whom he lashed out.

At the locker room, the club watches a video from Zava announcing his retirement to spend time with his family and tend to his avocado farm. After his call with Henry, Ted wards off a panic attack and makes a speech to the team suggesting Zava's departure will benefit them, as it will force the team to believe in themselves. When half the "Believe" sign falls from the wall, he tears up the rest of it, saying it's "just a sign" and that their belief in themselves and each other cannot be ripped apart. The team regains its spirits, and Jamie (Phil Dunster) and Roy (Brett Goldstein) continue their workout sessions.

== Development ==
=== Production ===
The episode was directed by supervising producer Matt Lipsey and written by executive producer Jamie Lee. This was Lipsey's third directing credit, and Lee's third writing credit for the show.

== Critical reviews ==
"Signs" received mixed reviews from critics. The review aggregator website Rotten Tomatoes reported a 50% approval rating for the episode, based on six reviews.

Manuel Betancourt of The A.V. Club gave the episode a "C+" and wrote, "Are we at a turning point this season? We're not even halfway through Ted Lasso's final season and, perhaps given the length of these most recent episodes, it feels like we're both covering a lot of ground all while leaving so many B/C plots dangling. I hope now that Zava's out of the picture we can maybe return to what made Ted Lasso such a breath of fresh air a few years back before its own messaging began to feel stale even within the show itself."

Keith Phipps of Vulture gave the episode a 3 star rating out of 5 and wrote, "This is an odd episode, one in which the subject of malaise has seeped into the tone a bit. Season three has upped the drama for a handful of its characters and taken on so many subplots that even the 45-plus-minute running times that have become standard don't feel long enough to contain all the narrative every episode needs to burn through. At the same time, the balance between character business and spritely humor has tilted toward the former, never more than in this episode. The cast's work is as strong as ever, and it might be expected for a series (maybe) entering the home stretch of its run to take on more gravity, but the moments of leavening humor have started to become more sparse." Paul Dailly of TV Fanatic gave the episode a 3.25 star rating out of 5 and wrote, "All things considered, 'Signs' was a bit of a disjointed hour of this Apple TV+ drama. Some of the storylines are moving swimmingly, but others are dragging on for dear life."

Lacy Baugher of Telltale TV gave the episode a 2.5 star rating out of 5 and wrote, "'Signs' reflects many of the problematic issues that have come to plague this season — a weird tonal imbalance, too many subplots, a lack of focus on the series' core characters, and bizarre plot twists that no one asked for." James Hibbs of Radio Times wrote, "Could the series potentially continue without Sudeikis' Ted, and instead focus on a new manager at Richmond, or feature one of the current coaching team stepping up to replace him? After the second episode of this season also dropped hints around the series' future, it seems that only time will tell." Christopher Orr of The New York Times wrote, "This episode of Ted Lasso was a bit disjointed — what Raymond Chandler would have called 'passagework' — following individual stories that were only loosely connected. But it did push forward several important subplots."

=== Accolades ===
TVLine named Ambreen Razia as an honorable mention as the "Performer of the Week" for the week of April 15, 2023, for her performance in the episode. The site wrote, "When her cocky, 'Who's coming with me?' failed to yield any takers (despite multiple tries and an increasingly sweetened perk package), Razia amped up her character's fury from a 5 to an 8 before dropping it back to a wounded, whimpering 1 before taking it back up — this time all the way to a bird-flipping, expletive-spouting 10. Coincidentally, that mirrors the perfect score we're giving Razia for this balls-to-the-wall, brilliantly whiplash-inducing performance."
