= We'll Never Have Paris (Ted Lasso) =

- Ted Lasso episode
- Episode no.: Season 3 Episode 8
- Directed by: Erica Dunton
- Written by: Keeley Hazell; Dylan Marron
- Cinematography by: Vanessa Whyte
- Editing by: Melissa McCoy
- Original release date: May 3, 2023
- Running time: 55 minutes

Guest appearances
- Andrea Anders as Michelle Keller; Annette Badland as Mae; Adam Colborne as Baz; Bronson Webb as Jeremy; Kevin Garry as Paul; Katy Wix as Barbara; Edyta Budnik as Jade; Jodi Balfour as Jack Danvers; Mike O'Gorman as Jacob Brianson

Episode chronology
| ← Previous "The Strings That Bind Us" | Next → "La Locker Room Aux Folles" |

"We'll Never Have Paris" is the eighth episode of the third season of the American sports comedy-drama television series Ted Lasso, based on the character played by Jason Sudeikis in a series of promos for NBC Sports' coverage of England's Premier League. It is the 30th overall episode of the series and was written by Keeley Hazell and Dylan Marron, and directed by Erica Dunton. It was released on Apple TV+ on May 3, 2023.

The series follows Ted Lasso, an American college football coach who is unexpectedly recruited to coach a fictional English Premier League soccer team, AFC Richmond, despite having no experience coaching soccer. The team's owner, Rebecca Welton, hires Lasso hoping he will fail as a means of exacting revenge on the team's previous owner, Rupert, her unfaithful ex-husband. The previous season saw Rebecca work with Ted in saving it, which culminated with their promotion to the Premier League. In the episode, Ted is visited by Henry, while fearing that Michelle will get engaged. Meanwhile, Keeley is shocked to find that a sexually explicit video of hers has been leaked, while Nate wonders how his relationship with Jade is going.

The episode received mixed reviews from critics, who praised Jason Sudeikis' performance, but criticized the pacing and Keeley's and Nate's storylines.

== Plot ==
AFC Richmond is on a winning streak. But Ted (Jason Sudeikis) is anxious, as Dr. Jacob (Mike O'Gorman) is taking Michelle (Andrea Anders) on a surprise trip to Paris, leaving Henry (Gus Turner) with Ted.

Keeley (Juno Temple) is horrified to discover that a sexually explicit video of her is part of a massive leak of such videos to the Internet. Isaac (Kola Bokinni) orders the team to delete all sexually explicit images from their phones to prevent future leaks. When Colin (Billy Harris) leaves the locker room, Isaac follows him and takes his phone to delete what he was looking at. Surprised at what he sees, Isaac looks back at Colin, gives a slight nod, before silently handing him back his phone and walking away.

Ted fears that Dr. Jacob will propose to Michelle in Paris, although his friends tell him not to fret about something that hasn't happened yet. Ted asks Rebecca (Hannah Waddingham) to hire a private investigator to follow them in Paris. Meanwhile, Nate (Nick Mohammed) and Jade (Edyta Budnik) sleep together after their date, but she is hesitant to label their relationship. Nate seeks advice from fellow West Ham staff members, but they are no help. Later, however, Jade describes Nate as her boyfriend.

Jack (Jodi Balfour) has her lawyers draft a formal-sounding statement of apology for Keeley to "minimize the damage" to her public image from the leak. Not wanting to apologize for something that wasn't her fault, Keeley refuses. Jack tells Keeley she should not have made the video in the first place and implies that she values her own reputation above Keeley's welfare. When Keeley shows no regrets, Jack ends their relationship. The next day, Keeley is visited by Jamie (Phil Dunster), who was the original recipient of Keeley's video when they were dating. Jamie apologizes for having forgotten to delete the email with the video, and the two share a hug.

Henry asks to watch a soccer game, so Ted and Beard reluctantly take him to a West Ham game. Nate sees them in the stands and nervously turns his back. After the game, Rupert texts that he will not allow Ted into the stadium in the future. Nate considers telling Rupert that he didn't mind Ted being there, but instead thanks him. Rebecca calls Ted to tell him that he shouldn't care if Michelle gets engaged. Meanwhile, Henry hears a busker singing "Hey Jude", and Beard explains that the song was written to comfort a boy whose parents were divorcing. When Michelle and Jacob return from Paris and Henry leaves with them, Ted notes that Michelle is not wearing a ring.

== Development ==
=== Production ===
The episode was directed by Erica Dunton and written by Keeley Hazell (who plays Bex in the series) and Dylan Marron. This was Dunton's third directing credit, Hazell's first writing credit, and Marron's first writing credit.

== Critical reviews ==
"We'll Never Have Paris" received mixed reviews from critics. The review aggregator website Rotten Tomatoes reported a 75% approval rating for the episode, based on four reviews.

Manuel Betancourt of The A.V. Club gave the episode a "C" and wrote, "This episode was full of moments, scenes, and outright storylines that made me wonder what had gone so terribly, terribly wrong with this once affable kindcore fish-out-of-water comedy series about a bumbling American football coach in London."

Keith Phipps of Vulture gave the episode a 3 star rating out of 5 and wrote, "Nate doesn't get a lot of help from those around him, not even from the makeshift Diamond Dogs he puts together at West Ham, complete with a pseudo-Higgins and a pseudo-Roy. Ultimately, there's not a lot of drama here. Jade's into him. In fact, she's happy to call Nate her boyfriend. They, at least, end the episode on an unambiguously happy note. As happy as they may have begun the episode, the same can't be said for anyone else." Paul Dailly of TV Fanatic gave the episode a 3.75 star rating out of 5 and wrote, "'We'll Never Have Paris' was one of the better episodes of the season because some relationships went south, long-dead relationships showed signs of life, and it leaves us with more possibilities as we approach the end of the series in its current form."

Christopher Orr of The New York Times wrote, "This is yet another episode that feels somewhat disjointed, following multiple story lines that don't overlap much or offer a strong through-line. One could make the case that this is an episode about the ends and beginnings of relationships. But the subplots nonetheless felt more like separate pieces than parts of a whole." Fletcher Peters of The Daily Beast wrote, "Not much else happens in the eighth chapter of Ted Lasso Season 3. Ted takes his son to the bar for a pint of milk. Nate cozies up with his new girlfriend. There are some high points (Keeley's steadfast stance on the video leaking) and low moments (everything with Jack), but all in all, the plot doesn't really move forward."
