= So Long, Farewell =

Song from The Sound of Music

Song by The von Trapp children (original Broadway cast)

from the album The Sound of Music: Original Broadway Cast Recording
- Published: 1959
- Released: December 1959
- Recorded: November 22, 1959
- Studio: Columbia 30th Street Studio, New York City
- Genre: Show tune
- Length: 2:48
- Label: Columbia Masterworks
- Composer: Richard Rodgers
- Lyricist: Oscar Hammerstein II
- Producer: Goddard Lieberson

"So Long, Farewell" is a song from Rodgers and Hammerstein's 1959 musical, The Sound of Music. It was included in the original Broadway run and was first performed by the Von Trapp children, played by Kathy Dunn, David Gress, Evanna Lien, Mary Susan Locke, Lauri Peters, Marilyn Rogers, Joseph Stewart, and Frances Underhill. "So Long, Farewell", "The Lonely Goatherd", and "Do-Re-Mi" are the only songs which predominantly feature the Von Trapp children. They first perform the song on their own late in the first act for their parents' party guests; when it is reprised near the end of the second act, they are joined by Maria (Mary Martin) and The Captain (Theodore Bikel).

== Description ==
"So Long, Farewell" is an ensemble song from The Sound of Music, composed by Richard Rodgers with lyrics by Oscar Hammerstein II. It is performed by the von Trapp children during a formal party at the von Trapp household, serving as a polite yet playful way for them to excuse themselves for bedtime.

The song is structured as a series of short verses sung by individual children, each followed by a recurring refrain. This cumulative format highlights the distinct personalities of the children and accommodates their differing ages and vocal ranges. The repeated farewell phrases—"So long," "Farewell," "Auf Wiedersehen," and "Good night"—combine English and German, reinforcing the musical’s Austrian setting.

Lyrically and dramatically, the number derives much of its humor from the children’s repeated exits and re-entries, which extend the performance beyond its apparent conclusion. Within the narrative, the song provides comic relief and underscores Maria’s influence in encouraging warmth and self-expression within the family.

In stage productions, the song is typically presented with simple choreography emphasizing timing and character interaction. In the 1965 film adaptation, it is staged on the mansion’s staircase, with camera movement and pacing enhancing the comedic effect, making it one of the film's most recognizable sequences.

== Legacy ==
"So Long, Farewell" was featured in the 1965 film the Sound of Music. It is one of the last songs written by Oscar Hammerstein II, who died nine months after the play opened.

The band Laibach released a video for "So Long, Farewell" on March 14, 2019. It depicts a Goebbels type family eating dinner in a bunker next to the Swastika Christmas tree from John Heartfield's O Tannenbaum im deutschen Raum, wie krumm sind deine äste!. The father (played by Ivan Novak) finishes eating and then leads them one by one through the basement door. According to Laibach the symbolism of this video is that the Von Trapp family never left Nazi controlled Austria but simply went "underground" much like how North Koreans are trapped in their totalitarian country. In their own words, the Sound of Music ends in "captivity and death." This music video also includes a reference to Josef Fritzl with the father leading his children to the basement. Lead vocalist of the band Laibach, Milan Fras, makes a physical appearance at the end of the video as a nun.

In 2023, the cast of the American television series Ted Lasso released a cover of the song for the season 3 finale of the same name as this song.
