= Men's Journal =

American monthly men's lifestyle magazine

Men’s Journal
- Editor-in-Chief: Brittany Smith
- Former editors: Greg Emmanuel
- Categories: Adventure
- Frequency: Quarterly
- Total circulation: 977,060 (June 2012)
- Founder: Jann Wenner
- Founded: April 13, 1992; 34 years ago
- Company: The Arena Group
- Country: United States
- Based in: New York City
- Language: English
- Website: www.mensjournal.com
- ISSN: 1063-4657
- OCLC: 883191893

Men's Journal is an American men's lifestyle magazine focused on outdoor recreation and comprising editorials on the outdoors, environmental issues, health and fitness, style and fashion, and gear. It was founded in 1992 by Jann Wenner of Wenner Media, who sought to create a publication for "active, accomplished men to fuel an adventurous and discerning lifestyle". Wenner Media sold Men's Journal to American Media, Inc. in 2017. The Arena Group acquired Men's Journal in 2022. After a two-year print hiatus during which its content was only available online, in July of 2025, Men’s Journal relaunched as a quarterly glossy magazine.

== Format ==
Each issue of Men's Journal is divided into 3 subsections:

- Notebook – encompasses the latest trends, products, destinations, style & design
- Blueprint – provides the latest science articles and expert advice on diet, fitness, and exercise
- Gear Lab – a monthly buyer's guide of tested and approved essentials: tech, tools and toys. Men's Journal hires experts and professionals to examine the products; the best performing gear throughout the year get highlighted in the December issue, "Gear of the Year".

== History ==
On April 6, 1992, The New York Times announced the debut of Men's Journal, saying: "The first issue of Men's Journal, a magazine for men interested in adventure, fitness and participatory sports, will appear on newsstands on April 13. ... The 180-page issue of Men's Journal carries 83 pages of ads. Straight Arrow will distribute 135,000 copies on newsstands with a $3 cover price to test reader interest."

In the years that followed, Jann Wenner repeatedly replaced Men's Journal's top editor, for seemingly little reason. "Men's Journal ... is about to explore the great indoors and begin competing more directly with the men's general-interest magazines, Esquire and GQ," the Times reported in August 2002. "The adventure is over for the editor in chief, Sid Evans, who was hired 20 months ago with the charge to undo his predecessor's moves toward the mainstream and return Men's Journal to its adventurous roots. Mr. Evans is being succeeded by Robert L. Wallace, a former editorial director of Talk magazine and an editor at Rolling Stone in the 1970's and 1980's."

In 2014, Matthew Power—"a wide-roving journalist whose writing took readers from a journey down the Mississippi with modern-day hobos to the scenes of international disasters"—died from heat stroke and exhaustion while on assignment for Men's Journal in Uganda.

In 2017, Wenner Media sold Men's Journal to AMI, publisher of the National Enquirer, among other supermarket tabloids. On July 21, 2017, Greg Emmanuel was named chief content officer of Men's Journal, succeeding Mark Healey. In August 2017, Men's Journal began incorporating Men's Fitness into its print edition, increasing both its page count and issue count to 12 issues annually.

On February 21, 2020, American Media announced the layoff of Men's Journal's entire New York editorial staff, totaling about 20 people. In doing so, the company also reduced the magazine's frequency, from 10 issues a year to six, and trimmed circulation to 1 million, down from about 1.25 million. WWD reported: "...David Pecker’s American Media is merging Men’s Journal's editorial operations with Carlsbad, Calif.-based The Adventures Sport Network, which it acquired last year. From April, all editorial operations will be run out of that West Coast office."

At the time of the layoffs, Men's Journal, after years of losing money under Wenner Media, was profitable.

The New York Post reported: "The layoffs include Greg Emmanuel, the chief content officer and most senior editor, who had moved with the title from Wenner Media and got elevated to the top job when American Media laid off the previous editor-in-chief, Mark Healy, in 2017."

On Twitter, the news was taken as the death of the magazine. "RIP @mensjournal," the writer Stephen Rodrick wrote. The investigative reporter Bryn Stole wrote: "here is full of the kinds of ambitious and entertaining pieces that made Men's Journal a damn fine magazine. It was among a small—& dwindling—number of places that'd actually pay writers to chase these sorts of stories."

In December 2022, it was reported that The Arena Group, owner of Sports Illustrated and other publications, would acquire Men's Journal from AMI. On February 3, 2023, the Wall Street Journal reported that The Arena Group would begin using artificial intelligence to generate magazine content. On February 9, Futurism reported that the first story Men’s Journal published using AI — a piece titled "What All Men Should Know About Low Testosterone" — included “serious errors.” Bradley Anawalt, the chief of medicine at the University of Washington Medical Center, pointed out 18 specific errors in the story, according to Futurism.

In February 2023, subscribers of Men’s Journal received the March 2023 issue of Sports Illustrated with a cover announcing that Men's Journal had ceased publication. Subscribers were to receive copies of Sports Illustrated for the remaining duration of their subscription, and those subscribed to both will have their Sports Illustrated subscription extended by the amount of Men's Journal issues that they would not receive.

On July 11, 2025, the print edition of Men’s Journal hit newsstands once again with The Bear’s Matty Matheson on its cover. Relaunched as a quarterly publication by The Arena Group, the 100-page summer issue was helmed by editor-in-chief Brittany Smith.

== Covers ==
Men's Journal covers have included Jeremy Renner, Mark Wahlberg, Robert Downey Jr., Daniel Craig, Rafael Nadal, Jake Gyllenhaal, Anderson Cooper, Jimmy Fallon, Harrison Ford, Anthony Bourdain, Liam Neeson, J. J. Watt, and Arnold Schwarzenegger.
