= Stephen Rodrick =

American journalist

- Occupation: Journalist
- Writing career
- Subjects: Politics, Film, Sports
- Notable awards: Peabody Award (as segment editor and online editor)
- Movement: New Journalism

Stephen Rodrick is an American journalist who is a contributing writer for The New York Times Magazine and a contributing editor for Men's Journal. He also writes for Rolling Stone. Rodrick writes mostly about politics, film, and sports, often following his subjects around for months before writing.

== Biography ==
Before becoming a reporter, Rodrick worked as a deputy press secretary for United States Senator Alan J. Dixon.

In 1996, Rodrick wrote an exposé of controversial Republican political consultant Arthur Finkelstein for Boston Magazine. The story included the first interview with Finkelstein in over a decade.

Rodrick's stories for New York magazine have included profiles of Senator Fred Thompson and former New York Mayor Rudy Giuliani. The Giuliani story was included in the 2007 edition of The Best American Political Writing anthology. Rodrick's stories have also been anthologized five times in The Best American Sports Writing series, The Best American Crime Reporting series, Wild Stories: The Best of Men's Journal, and Going Long: The Best Stories From Runner's World. His first book, The Magical Stranger was published in May 2013. The book is an account of his father's life, Commander Peter Rodrick, killed in a plane crash on November 28, 1979, and two years spent with VAQ-135, his father's former squadron. The book was excerpted in Men's Journal, Slate, Salon, and The New York Times Magazine. In November 2013, Tina Brown described Rodrick's profile of Robert Redford as "a very, very evocative piece about Redford, who is himself a survivor." In 2018, Rodrick wrote a profile about actor Johnny Depp for the Rolling Stone.

He appears briefly as a New York Times reporter in Tristram Shandy: A Cock and Bull Story and, uncredited, as a fantasy baseball player in Knocked Up..

== Bibliography ==
- The magical stranger : a son's journey into his father's life. New York: Harper. 2013.
- "The nerd hunter : the casting director Allison Jones is reshaping American comedy, one misfit at a time". Onward and Upward with the Arts. The New Yorker. 91 (7): 34–41. April 6, 2015.
