= Matt Lipsey =

British television and film director

- Born: England
- Occupation: Director

Matt Lipsey is a British television and film director. His work includes King Bert Productions TV movies such as The Boy in the Dress and Billionaire Boy, Baby Cow Productions sitcoms Human Remains and Saxondale, and Hartswood Films series Supernova, The Cup and Jekyll. His first film, Caught in the Act, was released in 2008. He also directed all 14 episodes of the BBC Two sitcom Psychoville.

In 1987, as part of a volunteer team from the Royal College of Art, he was the camera operator on Operation Raleigh: Not Quite Paradise. Emma Freud was the narrator. The film aired on BBC2 on 30 June 1988.

In 2005 he was presented with a British Academy Television Award for his work directing the second series of Little Britain.

In 2013, he directed Gangsta Granny.

In 2014, he directed the BBC television series Big School.

In 2017, he directed Sick Note starring Rupert Grint.

In 2019, he directed certain episodes of the comedy series Turn Up Charlie (directed alongside Tristram Shapeero), which was released on Netflix.

In 2020, he directed the comedy series Intelligence for Sky One starring David Schwimmer.

He was a producer and director for episodes of Ted Lasso during seasons 2, 3 and 4.
