= Billy Harris (actor) =

English actor

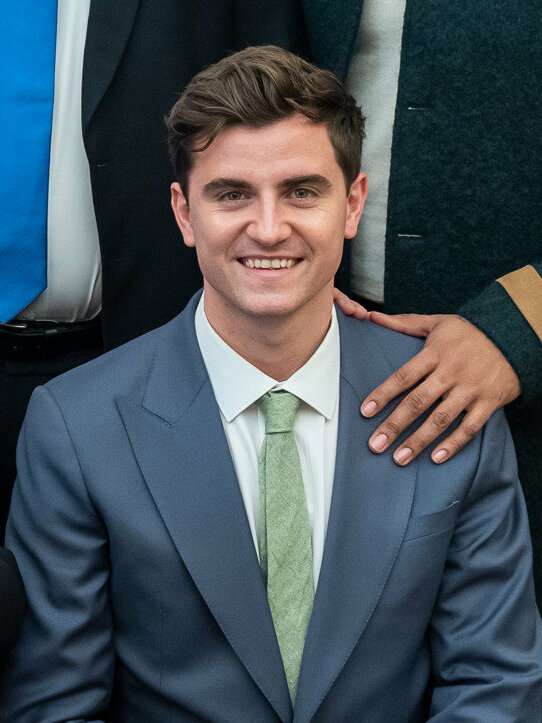
- Harris in 2023
- Born: 12 April 1994 (age 32); Southend-on-Sea, Essex, England
- Education: Bristol Old Vic Theatre School (BA)
- Occupation: Actor
- Years active: 2013–present
- Notable work: Ted Lasso

Billy Harris (born 12 April 1994) is an English actor. He appears as Colin Hughes in the first three seasons of the Apple TV+ television show Ted Lasso (2020–2023).

== Career ==
Harris was a student of theatre at the Bristol Old Vic Theatre School from 2014 and 2017. After graduation, he appeared in a wide number of stage roles.

=== Influences ===
Harris has cited Marlon Brando as an acting inspiration. He emulated Brando in a performance of his speech from the Joseph L. Mankiewicz film Julius Caesar in an unsuccessful audition and it helped him find his own voice as an actor. He has also expressed admiration for actor Anthony Hopkins and his philosophy on preparing for a role.

=== Early roles ===
Harris started out in commercials, notably one for Nike starring Kevin Durant. He then had a few small parts in short films and web series. Harris' first lead role was as Callum McGregor in a stage adaptation of the Noughts & Crosses novel series by author Malorie Blackman, OBE.

=== Ted Lasso and other work ===
Harris appears in the Apple TV+ series Ted Lasso as Welsh winger Colin Hughes. He was part of the recurring cast in the first and second seasons, and was upped to series regular for season 3. He received praise for his portrayal of Hughes when it was revealed that the character was gay, especially from LGBTQ+ fans. Co-creator of Ted Lasso, Brendan Hunt, said "Billy's been really amazing in this part" as the series discusses issues such as male vulnerability and homosexuality which are still taboo in the world of association football.

Harris had a small role in the BBC One series The Outlaws in 2022. His upcoming projects include voice acting in an animated show by writer and previous collaborator, Elliot Blake.

In 2025, he appeared in the Death in Paradise Christmas special, with Kate Ashfield, Josie Lawrence and Pearl Mackie.

== Personal life ==
Harris is from Southend, Essex and he has a sister. He is a fan of Manchester United F.C.

== Filmography ==
Key
| † | Denotes works that have not yet been released |

| Year | Title | Role | Notes |
|---|---|---|---|
| 2020–2023 | Ted Lasso | Colin Hughes | Recurring role (seasons 1–2), main role (season 3) |
| 2022 | The Outlaws | Posh Boy/Scott Patterson | 2 episode |
| 2025 | Silent Witness | DC Nick Whelen | 2 episode |
| 2025 | The Sisters Grimm | Puck/3rd Giant (Voice) | 4 episode |
| 2025 | Death in Paradise | Neil Dugdale | 1 episode |

== Awards and nominations ==
| Year | Association | Category | Project | Result | Ref. |
|---|---|---|---|---|---|
| 2023 | Screen Actors Guild Awards | Outstanding Performance by an Ensemble in a Comedy Series | Ted Lasso | Nominated | |
