= Promo (media) =

Form of commercial advertising

A promo (a shorthand term for promotion) is a form of commercial advertising used in broadcast media, either television or radio, which promotes a program airing on a television or radio station/network to the viewing or listening audience. Promos usually appear during commercial breaks, although sometimes they appear during another program.

== Background ==
Promos typically run from 15 to 60 seconds, with 30-second spots being the most common, although some occasionally run as little as five seconds or as long as 90 seconds. Most promos comprise video or audio clips of scenes or segments from an upcoming program, such as a television or radio series, film or special. Some television promos, particularly for an upcoming television series, are in a monologue format in which a star or host of the program breaks the fourth wall, which may often be done in a humorous and/or parodical manner. Most radio promos utilize this format as well, with a host of the program discussing the show itself, though some feature audio clips from past editions of the radio broadcast. Broadcast television stations promote upcoming newscasts by featuring teases of select story packages to be featured in the broadcast, such as an investigative report or a special-interest feature segment.

Norwegian Nynorsk Wikipedia promotion

The airdate and time of the program's broadcast as well as the name and/or logo of the station or network that the program will be broadcast on are displayed either at the end of or throughout the promo (in the latter case, the airtime and network/station may be displayed before it is mentioned by the announcer). Until the mid-1980s, on broadcast television stations the text showing the date and time, along with the station logo were displayed on the bottom of the screen. Unlike with broadcast and cable television, airtime information is not pre-displayed on promos for syndicated programs, as syndicated programs are typically aired at different times depending on the market; they are instead inserted by the station itself). However, stations now posterize graphics over the tail end of a syndicated program promos where the program's logo is shown (many stations use this treatment on promos for programs airing on networks that the station maintains an affiliation, such as Fox and The CW) or show the latter portion of the promo within a box surrounded by the graphic.

Premium cable channels and other television networks that do not accept outside advertising traditionally only air promos during pre-determined breaks that start after a program concludes; the length of these breaks can vary depending on the start time of the succeeding program, it is feasible for multiple program promotions to be shown within the break until the start of the next program.

== Snipe ==
An ad in the lower third of a TV screen during a show helps to remind people what network they are watching. Called a snipe, this type of promotion targets people, especially younger people, who are used to seeing such items when they look at computer screens or cell phones. Some people have criticized the practice because it is distracting, and such ads may cover up subtitles and prevent information from being seen. In some cases, the additional information can help people understand a story, but in others, too much information can interfere with communication.

== See also ==
- Advertising
- Promotion (marketing)
- Sponsor (commercial)
- Television advertisement
- Advertising adstock
  - Radio advertisement
- Marketing
- Bumper (broadcasting)
- Public service announcement
