= ATC Theatre =

Coordinates: 51.5273°N 0.0759°W

Actors Touring Company (ATC) is a British touring theatre company based in London, founded in 1978 by artistic director John Retallack. Matthew Xia has been led the company since 2018.

== History ==
Actors Touring Company (ATC) was founded in 1978 by John Retallack, who was also the company's inaugural artistic director. Other former artistic directors have included Mark Brickman, Ceri Sherlock, Nick Philippou, Gordon Anderson, Bijan Sheibani, and Ramin Gray.

Since 2007 the company has toured internationally and throughout the UK.

In November 2018, after dissatisfaction with Gray's leadership had led to his departure (after a formal warning relating to complaints of "inappropriate verbal conduct"), Matthew Xia was appointed artistic director. Xia focused on changing the direction and governance of ATC; to this end, he established a new board and relocating the headquarters from the Institute of Contemporary Arts to Brixton House, which had recently opened as a theatre. These moves were intended to better align with the vision and values of the company. Xia's first production with the company was Amsterdam, by Israeli writer Maya Arad Yasur, at the Orange Tree Theatre in Richmond, London, in autumn 2019.

== Description ==
Actors Touring Company (ATC)

The company pursues a policy of internationalism — making theatre collaboratively with artists from abroad, as well as with the voices of the global nations with the UK.

== Awards and nominations ==
ATC received Olivier Award nominations for the productions of The Brothers Size with the Young Vic and Ivan and the Dogs with Soho Theatre.

The company won an Olivier Award for the production of Gone Too Far! with the Royal Court Theatre.

In 2021, ATC's commission Family Tree by Mojisola Adebayo won the 25th Alfred Fagon Award, in a ceremony held at the National Theatre.

In 2023, Tambo & Bones and received three nominations in the 2023 Black British Theatre Awards, including Best Director for Matthew Xia, and Best Production

== Selected productions ==
=== Matthew Xia's tenure (2018 – present) ===
- 2023: Tambo & Bones, at Theatre Royal Stratford East, written by African American poet and playwright Dave Harris, from West Philadelphia; directed by Xia, who also wrote the hip hop music for the production
- 2021-2: Rice, by Michele Lee, co-produced with Orange Tree Theatre, directed by Xia
- 2021: Family Tree by Mojisola Adebayo, co-produced with Greenwich & Docklands International Festival and Young Vic, directed by Xia
- 2021: Dear Tomorrow: Hope from Home, co-produced with Northern Stage, by Ameera Conrad, Satinder Chohan, Hannah Khalid, Nemo Martin, Chiméne Suleyman, Eve Leigh, directed by Xia and Natalie Ibu
- 2020: Dear Tomorrow by Maya Arad Yasur, Kimber Lee and Stephanie Street (letters of hope delivered during COVID lockdowns) directed by Xia
- 2019 Amsterdam by Maya Arad Yasur, co-produced with Orange Tree Theatre and Theatre Royal, Plymouth and Richmond, 2019; tour, 2020 (cancelled due to COVID, production released via online streaming) directed by Xia

=== Ramin Gray's tenure (2011–2018) ===
- 2016 – Winter Solstice by Roland Schimmelpfennig, directed by Ramin Gray
- 2016 -2018 – The Suppliant Women by Aeschylus, in a new version by David Greig, directed by Ramin Gray
- 2015 – Living with the Lights On with Mark Lockyer, directed by Ramin Gray
- 2015 – Martyr by Marius von Mayenburg, directed by Ramin Gray
- 2014 – Blind Hamlet by Nassim Soleimanpour, directed by Ramin Gray
- 2014 – Hendelsen, the Norwegian-language version of The Events by David Greig, translated by Oda Radoor, directed by Ramin Gray
- 2014 – Chorale – A Sam Shepard Roadshow directed by Simon Usher
- 2013 – Die Ereignisse, the German-language version of The Events by David Greig, translated by Brigitte Auer, directed by Ramin Gray
- 2013 – The Events by David Greig, directed by Ramin Gray
- 2012 – The Broadwalk Trilogy, comprising three short plays by Mikhail Durnenkov, Pavel Pryazhko, and Natal’ya Vorozhbit, directed by Ramin Gray and Sacha Wares
- 2012 – Making the Sound of Loneliness, created by Jack Tarlton and Simon Usher, directed by Simon Usher
- 2012 – Illusions by Ivan Viripaev, translated by Cazimir Liske, directed by Ramin Gray
- 2012 – Crave by Sarah Kane, directed by Ramin Gray
- 2012 – Wild Swans, adapted by Alex Woods from the memoir by Jung Chang, directed by Sacha Wares
- 2011 – The Golden Dragon by Roland Schimmelpfennig, directed by Ramin Gray

=== Bijan Sheibani's tenure (2007–2011) ===
- 2011 – Fatherland by Tom Holloway, directed by Caroline Steinbeis
- 2010 – Ivan and the Dogs by Hattie Naylor, directed by Ellen Mcdougall
- 2010 – The Typist by Rebecca Lenkiewicz, directed by Bijan Sheibani
- 2010 – Eurydice by Sarah Ruhl, directed by Bihan Sheibani
- 2009 – Ghosts or Those Who Return by Henrik Ibsen, in a new version by Rebecca Lenkiewicz, directed by Bijan Sheibani
- 2008 – The Brothers Size by Tarell Alvin McCraney, directed by Bijan Sheibani
- 2008 – Gone Too Far! by Bola Agbaje, directed by Bijan Sheibani
- 2007 – The Brothers Size by Tarell Alvin McCraney, directed by Bijan Sheibani

=== Gordon Anderson's tenure (2001–2007) ===
- 2006 – Bad Jazz by Robert Farquhar, directed by Gordon Anderson
- 2006 – Gizmo Love by John Kolvenbach, directed by Matt Wilde
- 2005 – A Brief History of Helen of Troy by Mark Schultz, directed by Gordon Anderson
- 2004 – Jeff Koons by Rainald Goetz, directed by Gordon Anderson
- 2004 – Country Music by Simon Stephens, directed by Gordon Anderson
- 2003 – Excuses! by Joel Joan and Jordi Sanchez, directed by David Grindley
- 2003 – One Minute by Simon Stephens, directed by Gordon Anderson
- 2003 – Out of Our Heads directed by Gordon Anderson
- 2002 – Arabian Night by Roland Schimmelpfennig, directed by Gordon Anderson
- 2001 – In the Solitude of Cotton Fields by Bernard-Marie Koltès, directed by Gordon Anderson

=== Nick Philippou's tenure (1992–2000) ===
- 2000 – The Boy Who Left Home after the Brothers Grimm, directed by Nick Philippou
- 2000 – Macbeth False Memory by Deborah Levy, directed by Nick Philippou
- 1999 – The Tempest by William Shakespeare, directed by Nick Philippou
- 1998 – Handbag or The Importance of Being Someone by Mark Ravenhill, directed by Nick Philippou
- 1997 – Orpheus by Kenneth McLeish, directed by Nick Philippou
- 1997 – Faust with Pete Bailie and Alain Pelletier, text by Mark Ravenhill, directed by Nick Philippou
- 1996 – The Belle Vue by Ödön von Horváth, translated by Kenneth McLeish, directed by Nick Philippou
- 1996 – Miss Julie by August Strindberg, directed by Nick Philippou
- 1995 – The Modern Husband by Paul Godfrey, directed by Nick Philippou
- 1995 – Venus and Adonis by William Shakespeare, directed by Nick Philippou
- 1994 – Ion, the Lost Boy Found by Euripides, translated by Kenneth McLeish, directed by Nick Philippou
- 1993 – Celestina, attributed to Fernando de Rojas, adapted by Max Hafler and Nick Philippou, directed by Nick Philippou
- 1993 – The Maids by Jean Genet and No Way Out by Jean-Paul Sartre, directed by Nick Philippou
- 1992 – The Coaldust Affair by Eugène Marin Labiche, directed by Jane Collins

=== Ceri Sherlock's tenure (1989–1992) ===
- 1992 – Woman of Flowers, Blodeuwedd, directed by Ceri Sherlock
- 1991 – Punishment Without Revenge by Lope de Vega, directed by Ceri Sherlock
- 1991 – La Ronde by Arthur Schnitzler, directed by Ceri Sherlock
- 1991 – Mozart and Salieri by Alexander Pushkin, directed by Ceri Sherlock
- 1990 – Torquato Tasso by Johann Wolfgang von Goethe, translated by Robert David MacDonald, directed by Ceri Sherlock
- 1990 – Phaedra by Marina Tsvetayeva directed by Ceri Sherlock
- 1989 – The Triumph of Love by Pierre de Marivaux, directed by Ceri Sherlock
- 1989 – Cleopatra and Antony by William Shakespeare, directed by Malcolm Edwards

=== Mark Brickman's tenure (1986–1988) ===
- 1988 – The Illusion by Pierre Corneille, directed by Mark Brickman
- 1988 – Princess Ivona by Witold Gombrowicz, directed by Mark Brickman
- 1987 – Faustus, directed by Mark Brickman
- 1987 – Heaven Bent, Hell Bound, directed by Mark Brickman
- 1986 – The Bourgeois Gentleman by Molière, directed by Mark Brickman
- 1986 – Hamlet by William Shakespeare, directed by Mark Brickman

=== John Retallack's tenure (1980–1985) ===
- 1986 – Ubu and the Clowns / Ubu in Chains, based on Ubu enchaîné by Alfred Jarry, directed by John Retallack
- 1984 – A Doll's House by Henrik Ibsen, in a version by Michael Meyer, directed by John Retallack
- 1984 – Twelfth Night by William Shakespeare, directed by John Retallack
- 1984 – Peer Gynt by Henrik Ibsen, directed by Mark Brickman and John Retallack
- 1983 – Don Juan, adapted by Nigel Gearing and John Retallack, directed by John Retallack
- 1982 – Ubu the Vandalist, freely adapted from Ubu Roi by Alfred Jarry, directed by John Retallack
- 1982 – The Provoked Wife by John Vanbrugh, directed by John Retallack
- 1981 – The Tempest by John Vanbrugh, directed by John Retallack
- 1980 – Berlin, Berlin, based on The Man Without Qualities by Robert Musil, music by Paul Sand, directed by John Retallack
- 1980 – The Life and Death of Don Quixote, based on Don Quixote by Miguel de Cervantes, directed by John Retallack
- 1978 – Don Juan
