= Matthew Xia =

- Born: 1982 (age 43–44); Waltham Forest, London, England
- Other name: DJ Excalibah
- Occupations: Theatre director, DJ, radio presenter, journalist
- Website: www.matthewxia.com

Matthew Xia (born 1982) is a British theatre director, DJ, composer, broadcaster, and journalist. He is currently the Artistic Director of the Actors Touring Company. He performs music under the name DJ Excalibah.

== Early life and education ==
Matthew Xia was born in 1982 to a Scottish and English mother and a Jamaican father. He was born in Waltham Forest, London. He grew up in the Leytonstone and Newham areas.

His interest in the performing arts started when he was 11 years old. He joined the youth theatre program at the Theatre Royal Stratford East. During this time, he experienced his very first acting audition alongside Jude Law.

== Career ==
As a young man, Xia worked for his uncle's recruitment agency. He did some map reading for drivers and picked up a few other random jobs before launching his music career.

=== DJ Excalibah and Broadcasting ===
Xia's first major role was working as a DJ. Under the stage name DJ Excalibah, he became a prominent hip hop DJ. He presented his show Tales From the Legend on BBC Radio 1Xtra until 2005. His wider broadcast work includes hosting on BBC Radio 1, 6 Music, the BBC World Service, and Radio 4. He has also submitted formal responses to Ofcom consultations regarding BBC performance standards.

During the parade at the 2012 Summer Paralympics opening ceremony, he presented a mix of global music alongside DJ Walde and Goldierocks. He has performed live sets at the Glastonbury Festival, Ministry of Sound, Fabric, and various clubs across Europe.

=== Theatre direction ===
As a young actor, he appeared in the television series Tube Tales. The project was directed by Armando Iannucci and marked his first paid acting job.

He eventually transitioned into directing and leadership. He sat on the board at the Theatre Royal Stratford East for 10 years and served as their associate director from 2009 to 2010. He developed a strong collaborative style with theatre designers during this period. His directing work there included I Was Looking at the Ceiling and Then I Saw the Sky, Mad Blud, Re:Definition, Da Boyz, and The Blacks.

In 2013, Xia received the Regional Theatre Young Director Scheme bursary. He took a post as the director in residence at the Liverpool Everyman and Playhouse theatres. There he directed the premiere of Daniel Matthew's Scrappers and worked as the associate director for the Everyman's opening ceremony. That same year, his production of Sizwe Banzi is Dead sold out a six-week run at the Young Vic before launching a national tour. He returned to the Young Vic in 2015 to direct a revival of Joe Penhall's Blue/Orange starring David Haig and Daniel Kaluuya.

From 2014 to 2017, Xia served as the associate artistic director at the Manchester Royal Exchange. His directing credits there included Katherine Soper's Wish List, Stephen Sondheim's Into the Woods, and an adaptation of Frankenstein by April De Angelis.

In November 2018, Xia was appointed the artistic director of the Actors Touring Company (ATC). His debut production with the company was Amsterdam by Israeli writer Maya Arad Yasur. It opened at the Orange Tree Theatre in autumn 2019. Xia worked to update the governance of ATC by establishing a new board and relocating their headquarters to the newly opened Brixton House.

During the 2020 Greenwich and Docklands International Festival, Xia directed 846 Live. The play was a direct response to the murder of George Floyd. The title referenced the 8 minutes and 46 seconds that a police officer knelt on Floyd's neck. In 2022, he directed Marcelo Dos Santos's Feeling Afraid As If Something Terrible Is Going to Happen at the Edinburgh Fringe and the children's show Hey Duggee.

In 2023, he directed Tambo & Bones for the Actors Touring Company. The production was written by Dave Harris. Xia also composed the hip hop music for the show. The play received excellent reviews and earned three nominations at the 2023 Black British Theatre Awards.

== Other activities ==
Xia is a founding member of the Act For Change advocacy group. He serves as a trustee for Artistic Directors of the Future. He has also held board positions for Rich Mix and Creative Future.

During the COVID pandemic lockdowns, Xia formed an informal group for Black cultural leaders. They met biweekly to discuss the pandemic's impact on the arts and coordinate responses to the Black Lives Matter movement.

Xia works in education as a tutor for the Arvon foundation and as a staff member at the Central School of Speech and Drama. He was a judge for the Bruntwood Prize for Playwriting in 2017 and the Alfred Fagon Award in 2017. He also served as a jury member for the Eurovision Song Contest 2022.

As a journalist, Xia has contributed articles to The Stage, Hip Hop Connection, The Sunday Telegraph, The Guardian, and the Evening Standard.

== Recognition and awards ==
- 2013: Recipient of the Regional Theatre Young Director Scheme bursary.
- 2013: Winner of the Young Vic Genesis Future Director award for Sizwe Banzi is Dead.
- 2017: Manchester Theatre award for best studio production for Wish List.
- 2019: Honorary doctorate from the University of the Arts London.
- 2022: Olivier Award for best family entertainment for Hey Duggee The Live Theatre Show.

== Selected theatre productions ==
- 2004: Da Boyz by Rodgers & Hart at Theatre Royal Stratford East.
- 2007: The Blacks by Jean Genet at Theatre Royal Stratford East.
- 2011: I Was Looking at the Ceiling and Then I Saw the Sky by John Adams at Theatre Royal Stratford East.
- 2013: Sizwe Banzi Is Dead by Athol Fugard at the Young Vic.
- 2015: Into The Woods by Stephen Sondheim at the Manchester Royal Exchange.
- 2015: Blue/Orange by Joe Penhall at the Young Vic.
- 2016: Wish List by Katherine Soper at the Manchester Royal Exchange.
- 2018: Frankenstein adapted by April De Angelis at the Manchester Royal Exchange.
- 2018: Shebeen by Mufaro Makubika.
