= Big Week (Ted Lasso) =

- Ted Lasso episode
- Episode no.: Season 3 Episode 4
- Directed by: Destiny Ekaragha
- Written by: Brett Goldstein
- Cinematography by: Vanessa Whyte
- Editing by: Melissa McCoy
- Original release date: April 5, 2023
- Running time: 49 minutes

Guest appearances
- Andrea Anders as Michelle Lasso; Annette Badland as Mae; Adam Colborne as Baz; Bronson Webb as Jeremy; Kevin Garry as Paul; Katy Wix as Barbara; Maximilian Osinski as Zava; Ellie Taylor as Flo "Sassy" Collins; Ambreen Razia as Shandy Fine; Edyta Budnik as Jade; Jodi Balfour as Jack Danvers

Episode chronology
← Previous "4-5-1"	Next → "Signs"

"Big Week" is the fourth episode of the third season of the American sports comedy-drama television series Ted Lasso, based on the character played by Jason Sudeikis in a series of promos for NBC Sports' coverage of England's Premier League. It is the 26th overall episode of the series and was written by main cast actor Brett Goldstein and directed by Destiny Ekaragha. It was released on Apple TV+ on April 5, 2023.

The series follows Ted Lasso, an American college football coach, who is unexpectedly recruited to coach a fictional English Premier League soccer team, AFC Richmond, despite having no experience coaching soccer. The team's owner, Rebecca Welton, hires Lasso hoping he will fail as a means of exacting revenge on the team's previous owner, Rupert, her unfaithful ex-husband. The previous season saw Rebecca work with Ted in saving it, which culminated with their promotion to the Premier League. In the episode, Richmond is facing West Ham United, with Ted and Nate finally seeing each other since he left Richmond.

The episode received positive reviews from critics, who praised the set-up for the match, performances, character development (particularly Nate) and emotional tone.

== Plot ==
As part of their deal, Jamie (Phil Dunster) is woken by Roy (Brett Goldstein) at 4 am, to prepare for their new workout. Meanwhile, Nate (Nick Mohammed) is preparing for the West Ham match against AFC Richmond.

After spending the night together, Ted (Jason Sudeikis) asks Sassy (Ellie Taylor) to go out on a date with him. Sassy declines, stating that he is "a mess" like her and feeling that a relationship could jeopardize their current friends with benefits status. Discussing the team's formation, Beard (Brendan Hunt) and Roy decide on "Nate's False Nine" formation, which will probably surprise Nate, although they think that Zava (Maximilian Osinski) may disapprove of the tactic, which involves his dropping back with the rest of the team.

Questioning why Ted isn't angry with Nate, Beard and Roy show him video footage of Nate tearing apart the "Believe" sign in the locker room, which was recently discovered by Trent (James Lance). They're hoping Ted will show the footage to the team as motivation. Ted is still conflicted about his wife's relationship with their marriage counselor, Dr. Jacob, and is motivated by Rebecca (Hannah Waddingham) to beat West Ham. Meanwhile, Nate has been regretting the way he left Richmond, noting his life did not improve as much as he wanted. Rupert (Anthony Head) tells him he should not be worried and that he earned his position.

Before the game, Ted runs into Nate in the elevator, their first encounter since he left Richmond. Nate's apology is interrupted by Rupert, prompting Nate to leave. Keeley (Juno Temple) has her period in a restroom, where she is helped by a woman in the next stall. At their seats, she finds that the woman is Jack Danvers (Jodi Balfour), the venture capitalist who has invested in her PR firm. Shandy (Ambreen Razia) notes to Keeley that Barbara (Katy Wix) has taken an interest in Rebecca, which seems to unnerve her.

The first half of the game ends with West Ham scoring two goals, despite Richmond's dominating possession. Rebecca awkwardly confronts Ted at half time, encouraging him to forget the pressure and “have fun”. During halftime, Beard and Kent show the video footage of Nate to the team, enraging them. They play the second half extremely aggressively, which results in three Richmond players being sent off and the game ending with a 4-1 victory for West Ham. Despite scoring the single Richmond goal, Zava is disappointed by the match. Beard and Roy blame themselves for their approach, but Ted is not angry with them. During a press conference, Nate is questioned about not shaking Ted's hand after the game. Afterwards he is about to approach Ted in a hallway, only to be interrupted by an invitation from Rupert to a club to celebrate, causing him to miss Ted.

Rebecca sees Rupert kissing his assistant. As he is about to leave with Bex, Rebecca tells him not to ruin his life with Bex and their child. Shandy informs Keeley that Bantr has been trending since she changed the bio line to include having sex with celebrities, and Keeley forces her to change it back. At the club, Nate is celebrated for his role in the match and is introduced to a famous model, although he does not really enjoy the evening. Back at his apartment, Ted speaks with Michelle (Andrea Anders) through FaceTime and admits that he is disturbed by her relationship with Jacob. He tells her he will care for her and Henry, no matter what happens.

== Development ==
=== Production ===
The episode was directed by Destiny Ekaragha and written by main cast actor Brett Goldstein. This was Ekaragha's second directing credit, and Goldstein's fourth writing credit for the show. The episode was dedicated to the memory of Grant Wahl, a sports journalist who died in December 2022. Wahl was a fan of the series and influenced Trent Crimm's storyline in the season.

=== Writing ===
Commenting on Nate's story arc, Nick Mohammed said, "It's not yes, he gets fully redeemed or no, he never does. It's more complex than that, partly because Nate is a complicated character." He further added, "For some people, Nate could beg for forgiveness and do a whole manner of things, but never make up for the betrayal at the end of Season 2, right? I don't think that's in my control, or even the writers to a degree."

== Critical reviews ==
"Big Week" received generally positive reviews from critics. The review aggregator website Rotten Tomatoes reported a 100% approval rating for the episode, based on six reviews.

Manuel Betancourt of The A.V. Club gave the episode a "B" and wrote, "We're four episodes into Ted Lasso's third and final season, and you may have noticed that our titular mustachioed leading man has been mostly playing on the sidelines. This has given us plenty of time to venture into the lives of the very funny ensemble that surrounds good ol' Ted. But it was only a matter of time until he came into clearer focus. And what better occasion for that to happen than the big West Ham vs. Richmond game we’ve all been breathlessly anticipating?"

Keith Phipps of Vulture gave the episode a 4 star rating out of 5 and wrote, "The question at the heart of 'Big Week,' the fourth episode of Ted Lasso's third season: Is Ted a mess? Ted wants to know." Paul Dailly of TV Fanatic gave the episode a 4 star rating out of 5 and wrote, "'Big Week' was another solid episode of this Apple TV+ dramedy."

Lacy Baugher of Telltale TV gave the episode a 3.5 star rating out of 5 and wrote, "AFC Richmond and West Ham face off for the first time in Ted Lasso Season 3 Episode 4, 'Big Week,' and it goes about as well as any of us might have expected. Of course, anyone who's ever watched a sports movie before likely knew going into this episode that Richmond was going to lose this game, if only because it will make the Greyhounds' inevitable triumph over the Hammers in the season finale taste all the sweeter. But, at least Ted Lasso figures out an unexpected way to bring about the team's loss." Christopher Orr of The New York Times wrote, "As noted earlier, the fact that this season opened with Ted's face suggests that it will be largely Ted's story. But what will that story be? After his conversation with Sassy, it seems unlikely that his life path lies in that direction." Tim Stevens of The Spool wrote, "Director Destiny Ekaragha and writer Brett Goldstein are here to welcome us all to what we've been looking forward to since Nate first ripped that Believe sign: Richmond v. West Ham, Round One. Or, to put a fine point on it, Lasso v. Shelley, Round One. And without patting myself on the back too hard, it pretty much went down as I predicted last season."
