= 4-5-1 (Ted Lasso) =

- Ted Lasso episode
- Episode no.: Season 3 Episode 3
- Directed by: Destiny Ekaragha
- Written by: Bill Wrubel
- Cinematography by: Vanessa Whyte
- Editing by: A.J. Catoline
- Original air date: March 29, 2023
- Running time: 47 minutes

Guest appearances
- Sarah Niles as Dr. Sharon Fieldstone; Andrea Anders as Michelle Lasso; Annette Badland as Mae; Adam Colborne as Baz; Bronson Webb as Jeremy; Kevin Garry as Paul; Maximilian Osinski as Zava; Ellie Taylor as Flo "Sassy" Collins; Ambreen Razia as Shandy Fine; Mike O'Gorman as Jacob Brianson; Jeff Stelling as himself; Paul Merson as himself

Episode chronology
| ← Previous "(I Don't Want to Go to) Chelsea" | Next → "Big Week" |

"4-5-1" is the third episode of the third season of the American sports comedy-drama television series Ted Lasso, based on the character played by Jason Sudeikis in a series of promos for NBC Sports' coverage of England's Premier League. It is the 25th overall episode of the series and was written by executive producer Bill Wrubel and directed by Destiny Ekaragha. It was released on Apple TV+ on March 29, 2023.

The series follows Ted Lasso, an American college football coach, who is unexpectedly recruited to coach a fictional English Premier League soccer team, AFC Richmond, despite having no experience coaching soccer. The team's owner, Rebecca Welton, hires Lasso hoping he will fail as a means of exacting revenge on the team's previous owner, Rupert, her unfaithful ex-husband. The previous season saw Rebecca work with Ted in saving it, which culminated with their promotion to the Premier League. In the episode, Zava makes a great first impression at Richmond, although Jamie starts to feel jealous for all the attention he gets.

The episode received generally positive reviews from critics, with critics praising the character development and new storylines, although some still expressed criticism for the amount of subplots.

== Plot ==
Colin (Billy Harris) starts his daily routine at home, where he is revealed to be in a relationship with a man named Michael (Sam Liu). Colin leaves for Richmond, while Michael heads off for a trip to Dubai.

AFC Richmond welcomes Zava (Maximilian Osinski) into the club, although he arrives two hours late for a press conference. Ted (Jason Sudeikis), Beard (Brendan Hunt) and Roy (Brett Goldstein) discuss how placing Zava in the club's line-up will require benching another player and changing tactics. When he arrives, Zava impresses the team members, although the coaching staff is concerned when he proposes taking the forward position on his own and leaving the other players in the backfield. Meanwhile, Rebecca (Hannah Waddingham) skeptically visits her mother's psychic, Tish (Emma Davies). Among other things, Tish predicts that Rebecca will become a mother, but Rebecca dismisses her as a fraud.

The coaching staff settles for a 4-5-1 formation, reinforcing the strategy of having Zava score all goals. Before their game against Wolverhampton Wanderers F.C., Ted calls Michelle (Andrea Anders), but her phone is answered by Jacob Brianson (Mike O'Gorman), their former couple's therapist. Remembering a previous conversation with Henry, Ted realizes that Michelle and Jacob are dating, which disturbs him and triggers an incipient panic attack.

Zava starts the game by scoring a goal from midfield, halting Ted's panic attack and leading to a victory for Richmond. Zava then leads Richmond into a 6-game winning streak, placing Richmond as the third best team in the league, frustrating Nate (Nick Mohammed) and Rupert (Anthony Head). However, Jamie (Phil Dunster) also feels frustrated by Zava, especially when he steals a goal from him.

Sam (Toheeb Jimoh) invites the club to his yet-to-open Nigerian restaurant, Ola's. During the celebration, Colin arrives with Michael, presenting him as just a friend. Roy converses with Jamie, who feels left out by the attention that Zava has achieved. Roy offers to train Jamie, who accepts. Ted runs into Sassy (Ellie Taylor) and opens up about Michelle's relationship. As a child psychologist, Sassy notes that Michelle and Jacob's relationship is an ethical violation.

Sam gives everyone a green matchbook to commemorate the restaurant. Rebecca is taken aback, as Tish had predicted she would receive a green matchbook, and wonders if any other predictions might come true. Trent (James Lance) leaves the restaurant, where he sees Colin and Michael kissing in an alley.

== Development ==
=== Production ===
The episode was directed by Destiny Ekaragha and written by executive producer Bill Wrubel. This was Ekaragha's first directing credit, and Wrubel's third writing credit for the show.

=== Writing ===
On the decision to have Roy train Jamie, Brett Goldstein explained, "Doing things for other people will make you happier, and I don't think Roy was ever an actual, gifted footballer. He was an excellent footballer, but because he worked f–king hard [at it], whereas Jamie is a natural and doesn't have that work ethic. Roy sees that and thinks, 'if I can instill the parts of me that he doesn't have, he could be one of the all-time greats', and that would be a gift for both of them, really."

Regarding Ted's storyline, Jason Sudeikis explained, "When an ex moves on, that's a very human experience. I think the one thing that maybe eliminates some of the processes that people go through when that happens is that [Ted and Michelle] are an ocean and half a country apart." He also added, "you fall prey to those things, so I think you'll see the process of him going through those things, including exploring, as you labeled it, a betrayal by Michelle, [as well as] what that relationship [with Dr. Jacob] turns into, and how Ted responds to that."

== Critical reviews ==
"4-5-1" received generally positive reviews from critics. The review aggregator website Rotten Tomatoes reported an 80% approval rating for the episode, based on five reviews.

Manuel Betancourt of The A.V. Club gave the episode a "B+" and wrote, "The episode '4-5-1' opens and closes with a secondary character we haven't spent much time with. Colin, like many of the players not named Jamie or Sam, has long been merely a background teammate. That changes here. For all of a sudden, Ted Lasso is wading into the 'no homo' territory that so continues to afflict many locker rooms across the world. Colin, you see, has a boy he's seeing regularly. Yet, because of the tone-deaf way his teammates react to anything remotely homoerotic — as both ha-ha funny and ha-ha weird — Colin finds himself keeping that part of himself a secret."

Keith Phipps of Vulture gave the episode a 4 star rating out of 5 and wrote, "There's a lot going on in these episodes, isn't there? They're long and packed with plot, but moments like the winning montage suggest they're not just thrown together randomly." Paul Dailly of TV Fanatic gave the episode a 4.5 star rating out of 5 and wrote, "Zava's presence echoed through '4-5-1', a robust hour that washed away all my concerns about Ted Lasso Season 3."

Lacy Baugher of Telltale TV gave the episode a 4 star rating out of 5 and wrote, "Ted Lasso Season 3 Episode 3, '4-5-1', is ostensibly named after the soccer formation with four defenders, five midfielders, and one striker. But it probably should be called 'Zava', as the mega-talented if somewhat divaesque new Italian addition officially joins the AFC Richmond squad. And his effect — both on and off the pitch — is both immediate and extensive." Christopher Orr of The New York Times wrote, "I'm guessing the relationship between Zava and his teammates will sour before long, because a) the show has made a big deal about how he changes teams almost every season; and b) his real-life doppelgänger, Ibrahimovic, has a history of violent altercations with teammates. So stay tuned." Tim Stevens of The Spool wrote, "While my feelings about episodes of Ted Lasso have differed, installment to installment, there haven't been any that made me deeply angry. Sure, I've disagreed with certain developments. I've even been annoyed at times. I have never, however, felt a sort of bubbling rage at a plot development. Until now."
