= Gone Too Far =

Gone Too Far may refer to:

In music:

- "Gone Too Far" (Dragonette song), 2009
- "Gone Too Far" (Eddie Rabbitt song), 1980
- "Gone Too Far", a 1977 song by England Dan & John Ford Coley from their album Dowdy Ferry Road
- "Gone Too Far", a 2007 song by Gotthard from their album Domino Effect
- "Gone Too Far", a 2012 song by Soulsavers from their album The Light the Dead See
- "Gone Too Far", a 1966 song by Tages from their album Extra Extra

In other media:

- Gone Too Far (TV series), a 2009 reality TV series about drug addiction
- Gone Too Far!, a 2007 play by Bola Agbaje
  - Gone Too Far! (film), a 2013 adaptation of the play
- Gone Too Far, a Transformers story published by Fun Publications
