= Retallack (disambiguation) =

Retallack is a village in Cornwall, England. The Cornish surname Retallack comes from the three places named Retallack in Cornwall.

Retallack may also refer to:

- Retallack, British Columbia, Canada, a deserted mining town
- Joan Retallack (born 1941), American poet and scholar
- John Retallack (born 1950), British playwright and director
- Gregory Retallack (born 1951), Australian paleontologist and geologist, authority on fossil soils
- Retallack Resort and Spa, a holiday resort in Cornwall, situated near the site of Retallack village, close to St Columb Major

== See also ==
- Retallick, a surname
- HMS Retalick, a ship in Britain's Royal Navy
