= (I Don't Want to Go to) Chelsea (Ted Lasso) =

- Ted Lasso episode
- Episode no.: Season 3 Episode 2
- Directed by: MJ Delaney
- Written by: Sasha Garron
- Cinematography by: David Rom
- Editing by: Melissa McCoy
- Original release date: March 22, 2023
- Running time: 47 minutes

Guest appearances
- Annette Badland as Mae; Adam Colborne as Baz; Bronson Webb as Jeremy; Kevin Garry as Paul; Maximilian Osinski as Zava; Katy Wix as Barbara; Ambreen Razia as Shandy Fine; Harriet Walter as Deborah Welton

Episode chronology
← Previous "Smells Like Mean Spirit"	Next → "4-5-1"

"(I Don't Want to Go to) Chelsea" is the second episode of the third season of the American sports comedy-drama television series Ted Lasso, based on the character played by Jason Sudeikis in a series of promos for NBC Sports' coverage of England's Premier League. It is the 24th overall episode of the series and was written by Sasha Garron and directed by MJ Delaney. It was released on Apple TV+ on March 22, 2023. The title comes from the Elvis Costello song of the same name.

The series follows Ted Lasso, an American college football coach, who is unexpectedly recruited to coach a fictional English Premier League soccer team, AFC Richmond, despite having no experience coaching soccer. The team's owner, Rebecca Welton, hires Lasso hoping he will fail as a means of exacting revenge on the team's previous owner, Rupert, her unfaithful ex-husband. The previous season saw Rebecca work with Ted in saving it, which culminated with their promotion to the Premier League. In the episode, as Richmond starts the season, Rebecca tries to get a talented but arrogant footballer into the club, while Trent Crimm follows the club for a book.

The episode received generally positive reviews from critics, with critics praising Brett Goldstein's performance and character development, although some expressed criticism for the subplots and runtime.

== Plot ==
Ted (Jason Sudeikis) is visited by Trent Crimm (James Lance), who wants to write a book about AFC Richmond. Despite being warned by Rebecca (Hannah Waddingham), Keeley (Juno Temple) and Higgins (Jeremy Swift), Ted tells Trent to write it. The club also discovers that Zava (Maximilian Osinski), a talented footballer, has left Juventus FC, and many clubs want him. Despite his talent, Zava has earned a reputation for being difficult to work with, lasting only a single season with each club. Rebecca decides to meet him after realizing that West Ham United F.C. is interested in him.

Jamie (Phil Dunster) discovers that Keeley is single and offers a hug to Roy (Brett Goldstein), who refuses to disclose details. Despite wanting to keep it a secret, confusion causes Roy to reveal it to the club, embarrassing him. Roy is also forced to share his office with Trent, who will stay close to the club throughout the season. He refuses to talk with Trent and forbids the players from doing so. Meanwhile, Keeley is making several impractical decisions for KJPR, frustrating Barbara (Katy Wix). During a photoshoot, Keeley runs into an old friend, Shandy Fine (Ambreen Razia), who helps her with the shoot and reduces costs. When she decides to hire Shandy for a job, Barbara calls her out for hiring someone with no experience. Keeley convinces her to give Shandy a chance.

While the club leaves for their first match of the season against Chelsea F.C., Rebecca is informed that Zava will be joining Chelsea, delighting her that Rupert (Anthony Head) failed to sign him. But while Richmond is losing the game during the first half, Rebecca sees Rupert arrive and use his charm on Zava in order to sign him to West Ham. She confronts Zava in the bathroom, where she insults him, tells him he's overrated and challenges him to join a team that may not win without him. During halftime, Roy finally explains to Trent why he is giving him the cold shoulder: Trent wrote a scathing article about Roy when he first played for Chelsea at 17 years old. Trent regrets his remarks and both reconcile. During the second half, Richmond scores when the ball bounces off Dani's face into the goal, ending the game with a 1–1 tie.

At the post-game press conference, Zava shocks the media by announcing that he will play for Richmond and not Chelsea. While talking with Ted and Trent, Roy reminisces about his career at Chelsea, revealing he quit the team over his concern about his worsening skills. He admits he occasionally wonders if he should have stayed and allowed himself to simply enjoy the sport.

== Development ==
=== Production ===
The episode was directed by MJ Delaney and written by Sasha Garron. This was Delaney's sixth directing credit, and Garron's second writing credit for the show.

=== Writing ===
The episode introduced Maximilian Osinski as the footballer Zava. Brendan Hunt described the character, "He merely is Zava. Much as the wind is to the cliff, he is Zava. He just has no regard for the small things that a coach may try to do. He has no disregard either. He's a force of nature." The character borrowed the "egos and energies" of many players, including Eric Cantona and Robert Lewandowski. But primarily, Zlatan Ibrahimović was used as a role model for the character. Osinski, who speaks with a fluent Polish accent, chose to use a combination of Eastern Baltic accents to confuse the audience, explaining "I didn't want to make it like he's definitely Russian or French or Swedish. I just wanted a guy who's just been everywhere and lived everywhere. I had that in my head and I came on set with it, and I think they dug it from from [sic] the tape because they didn't ask me to change anything."

== Critical reviews ==
"(I Don't Want to Go to) Chelsea" received generally positive reviews from critics. The review aggregator website Rotten Tomatoes reported a 100% approval rating for the episode, based on six reviews.

Manuel Betancourt of The A.V. Club gave the episode a "C+" and wrote, "We'd already seen episodes ballooning past the 40 minute mark last season; this one doesn't seem to want to break from that: '(I Don't Want To Go To) Chelsea' is a whopping 48 minutes. And listen, I'm not saying such length is a detriment to the quippy Lasso sensibility. But also... I could have done with a tighter sophomore season three episode."

Keith Phipps of Vulture gave the episode a 4 star rating out of 5 and wrote, "Roy Kent is not an expressive man, but that doesn't mean he's not an emotional man." Paull Dailly of TV Fanatic gave the episode a 3.25 star rating out of 5 and wrote, "'Chelsea' juggled many storylines, but it's disconcerting that a significant chunk of the scenes felt like they could have been cut to make a leaner installment. Ted Lasso has been straddling the fine line between comedy and drama for a while now, and 'Chelsea' was the first time I wanted the series to pick a lane and stick with it."

Lacy Baugher of Telltale TV gave the episode a 4 star rating out of 5 and wrote, "In many ways, '(I Don't Want to Go to) Chelsea' feels a bit more like the Season 3 premiere I thought 'Smells Like Mean Spirit' would be. But, part of that is because it just basically ignores some of the story threads the season's first episode introduced." Christopher Orr of The New York Times wrote, "Last week, obviously, we suffered the gut punch that Roy and Keeley have broken up. I don't mean to dwell on this, but it would have been so much more powerful if it had taken place at the end of last season. Here it felt a little bit thrown in, a move-the-narrative-forward tactic rather than an opportunity for one or more genuinely heartbreaking scenes."

=== Accolades ===
TVLine named Brett Goldstein as an honorable mention as the "Performer of the Week" for the week of March 25, 2023, for his performance in the episode. The site wrote, "Ted Lasso's Brett Goldstein is a comedy dynamo whose praises we've previously sung for his ability to imbue every cuss word that comes out of Roy Kent's mouth with a sense of what he's feeling. Before now, it was the only way Roy knew how to express himself. But in Season 3's second episode, Roy opened up emotionally in a way we haven't seen before — and Goldstein effing delivered. As the ex-footballer spoke about what it was like being back at Stamford Bridge — how he regrets that he left the second things got hard, a character trait we now realize propelled him to end things with Keeley — Goldstein dug deeper than he ever has before. Not only could we see the sadness in Roy's eyes, but we could feel his pain in each and every breathy syllable he spoke aloud. It was all we could do to keep from reaching through the TV to give him a hug — and we all know how that would have gone."

== Controversy ==
Stamford Bridge, the home of Chelsea F.C. was used for filming this season 3 episode. It sparked controversy amongst Chelsea supporters after the show's editing team modified a memorial banner for the late Chelsea player Ray Wilkins that was paid for by the club's supporters. The banner which reads "They don't make them like Ray anymore" was changed to read "Roy" to tie in with the storyline of Richmond coach Roy Kent returning to his old club. Owner Todd Boehly released a statement apologizing to fans and to Wilkins' family, claiming the deal with Apple was agreed before he had purchased the club.
