= Belong (play) =

Contemporary play by British playwright Bola Agbaje

Belong is a contemporary play by British playwright Bola Agbaje. Following the life of a failed British politician who unexpectedly finds opportunity in his remote hometown village in Nigeria, Belong explores the impact of Western culture and the meaning of home and family. Originally coproduced by the Royal Court Theatre and the Tiata Fahodzi Company, Belong opened to critical acclaim, receiving praise for its ability to "tackle big issues" and "switch deftly between Britain and Nigeria."

== Characters ==
- Kayode, black man, forty-five. Well-spoken, sometimes has a Nigerian accent.
- Rita, Kayode's wife. Black woman, thirty-five. Nigerian, speaks English.
- Fola, friend, black woman, forty. Well-spoken with a Nigerian accent.
- Kunle, black boy, twenty-eight. Nigerian accent.
- Mama, Kayode's mother, sixty-five. Well-spoken with a Nigerian accent
- Barman/Buchi, black men, early twenties. Strong African accents.
- Chief Olowolaye, Kunle's boss. Black man, fifty. Strong African accent.
- Police Commissioner (Samson Ali-Amin), black man, forty. African accent.

== Plot ==
=== Scene 1 ===
Young and aspirational Kayode has just wrapped up a failed campaign for office in Britain. By the end of the scene, his wife's friend Fola has convinced him to take a vacation to Nigeria, his homeland, to visit Kayode's mother who he has not seen for several years.

=== Scene 2 ===
Upon arrival at Kayode's Mama's house, Kayode is introduced to a stray young man, Kunle, that Mama has taken in as one of her own. Following in similar footsteps to Kayode, Kunle is an aspiring politician who has brought social and education reform to his town at only the age of 28. Mama also learns that Kayode has stopped practicing his religion, and blames Rita, Kayode's wife, for it.

=== Scene 3 ===
Kayode, Kunle, and Mama discuss life in England versus life in Nigeria, and how Kayode has changed since moving to England. Mama goes to bed, and Kayode and Kunle discuss politics and the meaning of family extending beyond bloodlines. Kunle expresses his appreciate for Kayode explaining how he is not trying to replace him as Mama's son.

=== Scene 4 ===
Kunle and Kayode go to a bar for drinks, when Chief Olowolaye, a feared local politician enters. The Chief is under the assumption that Kayode has returned to Nigeria to invest in the Chief's political campaign after Kayode's failed run for office in England. Kayode explains this is not the case; but the Chief takes this as an insult, and the two get into a fist fight. Kayode storms out of the bar, but Kunle stays behind with the Chief.

=== Scene 5 ===
The police commissioner for the town arrives to arrest Kayode on charges of assaulting Chief Olowolaye.

=== Scene 6 ===
Back in England, Fola continues to criticize Rita for not having children and accuses her of disliking Nigerians and the African culture.

=== Scene 7 ===
Kayode returns from the custody of the police, who have beaten him severely. Mama paid 4500 pounds as a bribe to have Kayode released.

=== Scene 8 ===
Rita and Fola continue arguing about Rita's resistance to accepting her African heritage.

=== Scene 9 ===
Kayode tries to convince Kunle to run together for local office. Mama supports the idea, but Kunle is offended that Kayode is trying to "save Nigeria" when he does not even live there.

=== Scene 10 ===
Kayode continues on with his campaign without Kunle. He goes to the marketplace where he explains his goals of advancing Nigeria into the 21st century to the street vendors. He incites a chant, gaining the support of the vendors and locals.

=== Scene 11 ===
The Chief threatens Kunle that if he does not win the election, Kunle will owe him 100 million pounds. On his last straw, Kunle insults the Chief and storms out on him, leaving the Chief shocked and scared.

=== Scene 12 ===
Kayode is practicing his speech. Rita and Fola have traveled to Nigeria to join Kayode on his campaign but Rita gets in an argument with Kayode over whether he is going to stay in London or move to Nigeria. The play ends with Kunle entering Mama's home, coughing up blood, presumably from being attacked by the Chief. He is severely injured.

== Production history and reception ==
Belong has received workshops and readings around the England and the greater United Kingdom. On Thursday, April 26, 2012 the show premiered directed by Indhu Rubasingham at the Royal Court Theatre in Sloan Square in London in a coproduction with Tiata Fahodzi. The Telegraph praised Belong for being "sharp, funny, touching and, finally, disturbing" but criticized the text for being highly unbelievable, claiming audience members can only enjoy it if there are good at "suspending [their] incredulity."

== Playwright ==
Bola Agbaje is a Laurence Olivier Award-winning playwright of Nigerian origin. Born in London, Agbaje has spent almost her entire life in England, living in Nigeria between the ages of six and eight. Formerly an actress, Agbaje's works explore the African condition both in England and abroad, mainly exploring the assimilation and social dynamics in African communities. Works such as Gone Too Far!, and Belong examine these elements alongside the tensions and conflicts between racial and ethnic identities.

== Themes ==
Belong, in consistency with other works of Bola Agbaje, explores subjects such as ethnic identity versus citizenship and values, African governmental systems and Democratic consolidation, Western influence, and social stigmas surrounding expression of native culture. Belong boldly exposes the kind of corruption and practices common in Nigerian politics and business.

== See also ==
- Gone Too Far!
- Bola Agbaje
- Royal Court Theatre
- Politics of Nigeria
