= Gone Too Far! (film) =

2013 film by Destiny Ekaragha

- Film poster
- Directed by: Destiny Ekaragha
- Based on: Gone Too Far! by Bola Agbaje
- Produced by: Christopher Granier-Deferre
- Starring: Malachi Kirby; OC Ukeje; Adelayo Adedayo; Shanika Warren-Markland
- Cinematography: Stil Williams
- Edited by: Anna Dick
- Music by: Rhys Adams; Ben Onono
- Production company: Poisson Rouge Pictures
- Distributed by: FilmOne Distribution
- Release dates: 18 October 2013 (BFI); 10 October 2014 (United Kingdom); 16 January 2015 (Nigeria)
- Running time: 88 minutes
- Countries: Nigeria; United Kingdom
- Language: English
- Box office: ₦8,500,000 (Nigerian domestic gross)

Gone Too Far! is a 2013 British Nigerian comedy-drama film, directed by Destiny Ekaragha, and based on the Olivier-Award-winning play of the same name by Bola Agbaje. It stars Malachi Kirby, OC Ukeje, Adelayo Adedayo and Shanika Warren-Markland. It was released in Nigeria on 16 January 2015.

== Plot ==
Nigerian-born Yemi moved to the UK with his mother when he was three years old. He is now a teenager (about 16–17) living in Peckham, south London, with his mum. He has an older brother, Iku, who did not emigrate with them, and has grown up in Nigeria.

Their mum has finally arranged a visa for Iku to come to live with them. She has asked Yemi to get his room ready for his brother to stay. His uncle is collecting Iku from the airport, but Yemi has still not tidied his room. He wants to play football with his mates, but Mum disallows it. She heads out food shopping; then he goes to play football regardless.

At the park, Armani and Paris sit down on a bench, watching the footballers and chatting. Armani is hoping to see Razor, with whom she has recently broken up. Yemi clocks her and wanders over to chat her up. As Razor and Ghost pass by, and Razor becomes jealous and angry, Yemi's mum is also passing. She acts first and drags Yemi home by the ear, to his embarrassment.

When Iku arrives, Yemi is dismayed by his dress sense, in particular the socks and sandals. Mum wants to start cooking a meal, but can't find the okra she bought earlier. She sends Yemi out to get some more, insisting he takes his brother with him.

As they near the shop, Yemi asks his brother to wait behind. Iku catches up with Yemi in the shop; he wants him to get crisps and chocolate, and shoves some down the front of Yemi's hoodie. Yemi puts it all back, but misses one item. At the checkout, Reema frisks him and finds it. The brothers leave without the okra.

Aiming to source okra from the market instead, the pair suffer a series of mishaps, including, more than once, Iku losing sight of Yemi and becoming lost. They also see Armani and Paris a few times, whereupon Yemi tries to chat Armani up.

Meanwhile, Razor and his mates are sitting in a car smoking, listening to a local radio station. The theme of the show is "Can Black British rappers with African parents really use West Indian slang in their lyrics?" A discussion ensues during which it becomes clear that Razor has a pro-Jamaican, anti-African mindset.

Yemi comes across Armani's younger sister and asks her whereabouts. A short while later, Razor and Ghost pass the sister who tells them that Yemi was looking for Armani. They steal a bike from a younger boy, and ride it together trying to find Yemi.

Yemi and Iku encounter Armani and Paris once again. Armani persuades Yemi to get her a Peruvian hair extension to show his commitment. As Yemi contemplates stealing it, Iku ushers him out of the shop.

Razor and Ghost then spot them. After a short chase, a scrap ensues, until Iku fly-kicks both Razor and Ghost in the face, and the brothers run off. For the first time, Yemi is impressed by his brother, and resolves to "deal with Razor and his batch". But Iku regrets the fly kick, describes Armani as a "foolish girl", and reveals that earlier he asked Razor for directions when lost. Yemi is once again annoyed by his brother and they argue.

Meanwhile, Paris criticizes Armani for trying to use Yemi to make Razor jealous, and reveals that she herself fancies him. The pair fall out.

Razor phones an older friend, Blazer, who is at the radio station, to ask for help dealing with Yemi. Rez (the rapper Hi Res) and the DJ say that Blazer should tell Razor that he's African.

After yet another altercation between the brothers, this time during which Iku says he's proud to be Nigerian, and following which Yemi walks off, Razor and Ghost spot Iku alone, and beat him up. Yemi comes across Armani, who reveals she wasn't really interested in him. An argument about cultural heritage ensues, during which Armani, who has a Jamaican father and white mother, says she blames Africans for allowing the slave trade.

Yemi starts looking for his brother, and literally bumps into Paris, who offers to help. It gets dark. Paris spots Iku sitting against a wall, recovering. Iku refuses help from his brother, and says he's ashamed to call him that. Yemi concedes that it was his fault Iku was attacked, and promises to "make it right". Yemi finds Razor, Armani and Ghost. Yemi says he wants to talk to Razor, but Razor immediately starts scrapping with him. Iku arrives with Paris, and he and Ghost join in the affray. Paris questions whether they know what they're fighting about, to which Ghost admits he doesn't.

The guys from the radio station arrive. Rez asks: "Which one of you's on this African-West-Indian war thing?" Blazer asks: "You didn't know I was African?" Rez continues: "This black on black thing has to stop." Razor says he's going to leave the area and go to Jamaica, walking off. Iku says something in Yoruba, which Rez understands, and the pair bond, with Rez being impressed by Iku's socks and sandals. Rez invites the brothers back to his studio, but Mum turns up, irate, saying they are not going anywhere.

The next day, the brothers are doing exercises in the front garden, as punishment. Yemi asks if Iku has forgiven him. Iku smiles and says, "Of course." Yemi smiles and says: "It's been cool, you being here."

== Cast ==
- Malachi Kirby as Yemi
- OC Ukeje as Iku
- Golda John as Mum
- Adelayo Adedayo as Paris
- Shanika Warren-Markland as Armani
- Tosin Cole as Razor
- Miles McDonald as Ghost
- Pooja Shah as Reema
- Bhasker Patel as Mr. Patel
- KG Tha Comedian as Hi Res
- Michael Maris as Blazer
- Eddie Kadi as Radio DJ

== Reception ==
The film received mixed but generally positive reviews from critics. It has an approval rating of 73% based on 11 critic reviews with an average of 5.8/10 on review aggregator website Rotten Tomatoes.

In a 4/5 review, Tom Huddleston, for Time Out, praised it for being a "superbly judged comedy of racial manners." However, Wendy Ide, in a 3/5 review for The Times, criticized it for "some of the hammiest acting around."
