= Retallick =

Retallick is a surname originating in Cornwall, England. Notable people surnamed Retallick include:

- Katrina Retallick, Australian actress
- Culum Retallick (born 1985), New Zealand rugby player, plays for Bay of Plenty and Blues
- Brodie Retallick (born 1991), New Zealand rugby player, plays for Bay of Plenty, Chiefs and New Zealand

== See also ==
- HMS Retalick, a ship in Britain's Royal Navy
- Retallack (disambiguation)
