= Destiny Ekaragha =

British film director

Destiny Ekaragha is a British film director. She is only the third British black woman, following Ngozi Onwurah and Amma Asante, to have directed a feature-length film that was given cinema distribution in the UK.

== Career ==
Ekaragha began her career with a series of successful short films: Tight Jeans (2008), The Park (2009) and Chance Meeting (2013), all of which premiered at the BFI London Film Festival.

In 2013, she directed her first feature film, Gone Too Far!, an adaptation of Bola Agbaje's 2007 play of the same name. The film premiered at the 2013 BFI London Film Festival and was given a cinema release in 2014. In 2014, BAFTA named her one of their Breakthrough Brits.

In 2015, Ekaragha announced that she would be directing Danny and the Human Zoo for BBC One television. The TV film was written by Lenny Henry and was a fictionalized version of his life. It premiered on 31 August 2015.

In 2020, Ekaragha directed four episodes of The End of the F***ing World, which won the Best Drama award at the 2020 British Academy Television Awards.

In 2023, Ekaragha directed two episodes of Fellow Travelers for Showtime.
