= Inverting the Pyramid of Success =

- Ted Lasso episode
- Episode no.: Season 2 Episode 12
- Directed by: Declan Lowney
- Written by: Jason Sudeikis; Joe Kelly
- Cinematography by: David Rom
- Editing by: A.J. Catoline
- Original release date: October 8, 2021
- Running time: 49 minutes

Guest appearances
- Anthony Head as Rupert Mannion; Toheeb Jimoh as Sam Obisanya; Cristo Fernández as Dani Rojas; Kola Bokinni as Isaac McAdoo; Sam Richardson as Edwin Akufo; Annette Badland as Mae; James Lance as Trent Crimm

Episode chronology
← Previous "Midnight Train to Royston"	Next → "Smells Like Mean Spirit"

"Inverting the Pyramid of Success" is the twelfth episode and season finale of the second season of the American sports comedy-drama television series Ted Lasso, based on the character played by Jason Sudeikis in a series of promos for NBC Sports' coverage of England's Premier League. It is the 22nd overall episode of the series and was written by main cast member Jason Sudeikis and executive producer Joe Kelly and directed by supervising producer Declan Lowney. It was released on Apple TV+ on October 8, 2021.

The series follows Ted Lasso, an American college football coach, who is unexpectedly recruited to coach a fictional English Premier League soccer team, AFC Richmond, despite having no experience coaching soccer. The team's owner, Rebecca Welton, hires Lasso hoping he will fail as a means of exacting revenge on the team's previous owner, Rupert, her unfaithful ex-husband. The previous season saw Rebecca change her mind on the club's direction and working with Ted in saving it, although the club is relegated from the Premier League. In the episode, AFC Richmond faces Brentford F.C. in an effort to secure an immediate return to the Premier League. The episode takes its name from a 2008 football book, Inverting The Pyramid by Jonathan Wilson that refers to the historical 2-3-5 association football pyramid formation. Coach Beard is seen reading this book in the multiple episodes. The additional reference is to the Pyramid of Success developed by basketball coach John Wooden that hangs in the team locker room.

The episode received mixed reviews from critics; while some praised the resolution to Richmond's storyline, others criticized the episode for its over-abundance of subplots and rushed pacing. For his performance in the episode, Nick Mohammed was nominated for Outstanding Supporting Actor in a Comedy Series at the 74th Primetime Emmy Awards. Additionally, James Lance was nominated for Primetime Emmy Award for Outstanding Guest Actor in a Comedy Series nomination at the 74th Primetime Creative Arts Emmy Awards.

== Plot ==
News about Ted (Jason Sudeikis) having a panic attack reaches the media, with some pundits wondering if he is fit for his position. Rebecca (Hannah Waddingham) and the club make it clear to Ted that they support him. Ted apologises to the team for not telling them the truth but otherwise ignores the revelation, preferring to focus on their next game, which will determine whether the club is promoted to the Premier League.

Jamie (Phil Dunster) admits to Roy (Brett Goldstein) that he told Keeley (Juno Temple) he still loves her. Jamie apologises for his actions, and to his surprise, Roy forgives him. Meanwhile Keeley informs Higgins (Jeremy Swift) that Bantr's financial backer wants to finance her own PR firm, but she is nervous about telling Rebecca. Roy is delighted by the news, although he fears she will be less present for him. Roy and Keeley also find that the Vanity Fair article does not include photos of Roy, although he claims he is not bothered.

That night, Beard (Brendan Hunt) tells Ted he knows that Nate (Nick Mohammed) was the anonymous source who reported his panic attack and that Ted must act accordingly. The next day, Keeley tells Rebecca she’s leaving to start her own firm, and Rebecca congratulates her. They are both surprised to receive news that Rupert (Anthony Head) has bought West Ham United F.C.

On the day of the match against Brentford F.C., Roy admits to the "Diamond Dogs" that he felt hurt for being excluded from the photos, and he's annoyed at having forgiven Jamie for confessing his love for Keeley. This prompts Nate to admit that he kissed Keeley. Roy already knew and forgives him without difficulty, which Nate finds annoying. The first half ends with AFC Richmond losing 0-2, failing with Nate's False 9 strategy. He wants to abandon the tactic, but the team decides to stick with it.

After everyone heads back out onto the pitch, Ted asks Nate why he is so mad at him. Nate reveals that Ted made him believe he was very important, only to abandon him when he joined the coaching staff. He tells Ted that the team wouldn't have gotten this far without his input, that he earned his place as a coach, and that Ted doesn’t belong here. He angrily rejects Ted’s apology, telling him he’s "full of shit", and storms out.

During the second half, Sam scores a goal, and Jamie is fouled on his way to score. He gives the penalty kick to Dani (Cristo Fernández), who hasn't taken one since his accidental killing of team mascot Earl. Inspired by the presence of the new mascot on the sidelines, Dani scores a goal, which gives the team a draw - enough to promote them back to the Premier League. As the team celebrates, Ted finds that Nate has torn up the "Believe" sign in the locker room and left without a word to the team. Meeting with Akufo (Sam Richardson), Sam declines his offer, which enrages Akufo, who claims Sam will never play on the Nigeria national football team. Sam tells Ted and Rebecca that his decision was based on his journey, feeling he still has more left with the club.

After facing the press about the game and his mental health, Ted encounters Trent Crimm (James Lance), who tells Ted he was fired from The Independent after admitting to his editor that he'd revealed an anonymous source. Despite losing his job, he remains optimistic for his future and wishes Ted good luck in the next season. A few days later, Roy surprises Keeley with tickets for an overseas holiday, but while Keeley is delighted, she turns it down to remain in London and work on her new business. She tells him to not waste the journey and go alone. Sam buys a space where he intends to open a Nigerian cuisine restaurant. Two months later, in the London Stadium, the West Ham United F.C. players are training, while Rupert whispers something to a member of the coaching staff. The person turns, revealing himself to be Nate.

== Development ==
=== Production ===
The episode was directed by supervising producer Declan Lowney and written by main cast member Jason Sudeikis and executive producer Joe Kelly. This was Lowney's sixth directing credit, Sudeikis' fifth writing credit, and Kelly's seventh writing credit for the show.

=== Writing ===
The episode developed Nate's character, by having him admit his anger towards Ted and taking a job as a coach in West Ham United F.C. Nick Mohammed knew fans of the series wouldn't like his character's progress through the season, explaining "He's making a series of bad decisions; he has issues with his dad; he feels insecure and abandoned. It's all been building to his conversation with Ted in the finale where he's able to express what he's feeling." As part of the character's descent, the crew decided to have Nate's hair slowly turn grey throughout the season.

== Critical reviews ==
"Inverting the Pyramid of Success" received mixed reviews from critics. Myles McNutt of The A.V. Club gave the episode a "B-" and wrote, "'Inverting The Pyramid Of Success' — and the second season as a whole — was going for complicated and landed on confused. For every story being told, there were a collection of open questions as to why characters behaved in a certain way, but the show generally ignored these questions, or answered them offscreen in unsatisfying ways."

Alan Sepinwall of Rolling Stone wrote, "The creative team's wanted to expand its focus beyond the Ted-Rebecca core, and to dig deep into both the impact Ted's positivity was having on the team and the limits of that positivity. That's admirable ambition, and a lot of it worked very well. But despite two additional episodes and longer running times every week, there wasn't always enough room to successfully execute those goals. And that struggle was palpable in these last few episodes. The believing is great, and vital to the experience of watching and loving Ted Lasso. But having a sound strategy mapped out in advance helps a lot, too. Nate's an ass, but he's not wrong about everything."

Keith Phipps of Vulture gave the episode a 4 star rating out of 5 and wrote, "In some respects, 'Inverting the Pyramid of Success' illustrates just how Ted Lasso often doesn't have to be about Ted Lasso. Ted remains central to the story this week, but his season-long journey more or less ended with the preceding episodes." Becca Newton of TV Fanatic gave the episode a 4.5 star rating out of 5 and wrote, "It was the best of times - Richmond earned a promotion back to the Premier League. It was the worst of times - an unrepentant Nate managing Rupert's new football club. In other words, watching 'Inverting the Pyramid of Success' is like riding a rollercoaster - lots of ups and downs."

Linda Holmes of NPR wrote, "The fact that not every effort to fill out the complexities of the feelings among all these characters succeeded at the very end doesn't make me wish they hadn't gone at this season with so many interesting ideas." Christopher Orr of The New York Times wrote, "After a dozen episodes, Season 2 of Ted Lasso is officially in the books. And viewers of the finale might be forgiven for, in the words of Yogi Berra, feeling déjà vu all over again."

=== Awards and accolades ===
Nick Mohammed submitted this episode for consideration for his Primetime Emmy Award for Outstanding Supporting Actor in a Comedy Series nomination at the 74th Primetime Emmy Awards. He lost the award to his co-star, Brett Goldstein.

Additionally, James Lance was nominated for Primetime Emmy Award for Outstanding Guest Actor in a Comedy Series nomination at the 74th Primetime Creative Arts Emmy Awards. He lost the award to Nathan Lane in Only Murders in the Building.
