= 2023 Black British Theatre Awards =

The Black British Theatre Awards (BBTA) were launched in 2019 and recognise excellence among black performers and creatives in the UK.

In 2023 the Best Director and Best Producer Awards were sponsored by Disney Theatrical.

The 2023 Black British Theatre Awards winners and nominees were:

Best Play	Best Musical
Going For Gold (UK Tour); Tambo and Bones (Actors Touring Company and Theatre Royal Stratford East); The Importance of Being Earnest (UK Tour)	Sylvia at The Old Vic; The Color Purple (UK Tour); Tina: The Tina Turner Musical at the Aldwych Theatre
Best Male Actor in a Play	Best Male Actor in a Musical
Jazz Lintott for Going for Gold (UK Tour); David Alade for Sunny Side Up at the Theatre Peckham; Gamba Cole for Housemates Returns: Chicken Burger N Chips at Brixton House	Michael Ahomka-Lindsay for Newsies at the Troubadour Wembley Park Theatre; Caleb Roberts for Tina: The Tina Turner Musical at the Aldwych Theatre; Owen Chaponda for The Lion King at the Lyceum Theatre
Best Female Actor in a Play	Best Female Actor in a Musical
Toyin Ayedun-Alase for The Clinic at the Almeida Theatre; Aminita Francis for Family Tree (UK Tour); Kibong Tanji for Recognition (Talawa Theatre Company)	Elesha Paul Moses for Tina: The Tina Turner Musical at the Aldwych Theatre; Heidi Williams for Matilda the Musical at the Cambridge Theatre; Nicole-Lily Baisden for 42nd Street at the Sadler's Wells
Best Supporting Male Actor in a Play	Best Supporting Male Actor in a Musical
Christian Alifoe for Sucker Punch (UK Tour); Khai Shaw for Alice in Wonderland at Brixton House; Fode Simbo for Under the Kundè Tree at Southwark Playhouse	Kyrelle Lammy for Nativity! The Musical at the Birmingham Repertory Theatre; Jay Perry for Sylvia at The Old Vic; Kylan Denis for Matilda the Musical at the Cambridge Theatre
Best Supporting Female Actor in a Play	Best Supporting Female Actor in a Musical
Toyin Ayedun-Alase for Alice in Wonderland at the Brixton House; Bola Akeju for School Girls; Or, The African Mean Girls Play at the Lyric Hammersmith; Sasha Frost for Noises Off (UK Tour)	Billie-Kay Payne for Annie (UK Tour); Charis Alexandra for Tina: The Tina Turner Musical at the Aldwych Theatre; Irene Myrtle Forrester for Tina: The Tina Turner Musical at the Aldwych Theatre
Best Non Binary Performer in a Play	Best Non Binary Performer in a Musical
Phoebe Campbell for The Importance of Being Earnest (UK Tour); Sam Crerar for A Midsummer Night's Dream at Shakespeare's Globe; Travis Alabanza for Burgerz at the Southbank Centre	Claudia Kariuki for Six at the Vaudeville Theatre; Alex Thomas-Smith for & Juliet at the Shaftesbury Theatre

Creatives Awards
Best Director for a Play or Musical	Best Producer
Mya Onwugbonu for Hear Me Now at the Southwark Playhouse; Denzel Westley-Sanderson for The Importance of Being Earnest (UK Tour); Matthew Xia for Tambo and Bones (Actors Touring Company and Theatre Royal Stratford East)	Jazz Lintott and Frank Skully for Going for Gold (UK Tour); Ben Quashie for Alice in Wonderland at Brixton House; Shereener Browne for PlayFight at the Pleasance Theatre and Seven Dials Playhouse
Best Choreographer or Movement Director	Best Dance Production or Performance
Mthuthuzeli November for Nina: By Whatever Means (UK Tour); Kloe Dean for Tambo & Bones (Actors Touring Company and Theatre Royal Stratford East); Tinovimbanashe Sibanda for The Importance of Being Earnest (UK Tour)	Isabela Coracy for Nina: By Whatever Means (UK Tour); Cassa Pancho's Ballet Black for Nina: By Whatever Means (UK Tour); Tonyé Scott-Obené for I Am Here (UK Tour)
Best Opera Production or Performance	
Nadine Benjamin for Blue (English National Opera); April Koyejo-Audiger for The Magic Flute (UK Tour); English National Opera for Blue (English National Opera)

Recognition Awards
Lighting Design Recognition Award	Sound Design Recognition Award
Joshie Harriette; Simeon Miller; Simisola Majekodunmi	Xana; Rasaq Kukoyi; Tony Gayle
Theatre Design Recognition Award	Playwright Recognition Award
Debbie Duru; Fay Fullerton; Sadeysa Greenaway-Bailey	Adenike Ojo; David Alade; Matilda Feyiṣayọ Ibini
Book and Lyrics Recognition Award	Musical Director Recognition Award
Gerel Falconer	Sean Green for Sylvia at The Old Vic; Ian Oakley for The Color Purple (UK Tour); Sean Mayes for Mandela at the Young Vic

Achievement Awards
LGBTQ+ Champion Award	Disability Champion Award
Myles Hart; Claudia Kariuki; Daniel Jacob	Kyrelle Lammy
Best Teacher Award	Best Recent Graduate Award
Erina Lewis from Platinum Academy; Billy Luke Nevers from the Helen Hawkins Dance Company; Nadine Kennedy Wood from NDC College	Leah Vassell from ArtsEd; Charis Alexandra from ArtsEd; Jenna Bonner from ArtsEd
Lifetime Achievement	The Lord Hastings of Scarisbrick Award
Yvonne Jones Brewster OBE	Cedric Neal

== See also ==
- Laurence Olivier Awards
- WhatsOnStage Awards
- Evening Standard Theatre Awards
- Tony Awards
- Drama Desk Awards
