= Smells Like Mean Spirit =

- Ted Lasso episode
- Episode no.: Season 3 Episode 1
- Directed by: MJ Delaney
- Written by: Leann Bowen
- Cinematography by: David Rom
- Editing by: A.J. Catoline
- Original release date: March 15, 2023
- Running time: 43 minutes

Guest appearances
- Sarah Niles as Dr. Sharon Fieldstone; Katy Wix as Barbara

Episode chronology
← Previous "Inverting the Pyramid of Success"	Next → "(I Don't Want to Go to) Chelsea"

"Smells Like Mean Spirit" is the first episode of the third season of the American sports comedy-drama television series Ted Lasso, based on the character played by Jason Sudeikis in a series of promos for NBC Sports' coverage of England's Premier League. It is the 23rd overall episode of the series and was written by co-executive producer Leann Bowen and directed by MJ Delaney. It was released on Apple TV+ on March 15, 2023.

The series follows Ted Lasso, an American college football coach, who is unexpectedly recruited to coach a fictional English Premier League soccer team, AFC Richmond, despite having no experience coaching soccer. The team's owner, Rebecca Welton, hires Lasso hoping he will fail as a means of exacting revenge on the team's previous owner, Rupert, her unfaithful ex-husband. The previous season saw Rebecca work with Ted in saving it, which culminated with their promotion to the Premier League. In the episode, pundits predict Richmond will finish last in their new season, prompting Ted to find ways to motivate the club.

The episode received generally positive reviews from critics, who praised the performances and humor, although some criticized the writing, pacing and over-abundance of subplots not addressed from the previous season.

== Plot ==
At Heathrow Airport, Ted (Jason Sudeikis) brings his son Henry to board a flight back to Kansas. As he returns to his apartment to clean up, he calls Sharon (Sarah Niles) to talk about his day and progress. Sharon has been transferred to a new club and is also dating a man.

Rebecca (Hannah Waddingham) and Higgins (Jeremy Swift) find that pundits are predicting AFC Richmond will finish in last place for the new Premier League season, while West Ham United F.C. is predicted to be in the top four. Rebecca presses Ted to become more aggressive for the season, as she cannot lose to Rupert (Anthony Head). Meanwhile, Keeley (Juno Temple) has started her PR firm, KJPR, although she later confides in Rebecca that she feels unhappy and stressed out due to how little free time she has left. Her CFO, Barbara (Katy Wix), is concerned about Keeley's expenses for flowers.

Demotivated after reading the pundits' forecast, the team is underperforming during training. To lift their spirits, Ted has them descend into the London sewer system, where he explains that the "poopy" in the sewers is just like those predictions and tells them they need to build an internal sewer system within themselves and each other to keep the bad feelings flowing away. Meanwhile, at the London Stadium, Nate (Nick Mohammed) is training West Ham United players as their new manager but continues to struggle with his self-confidence despite the predictions of the team's success. During a press conference arranged by Rupert, Nate makes a cruel remark to a reporter and mocks Richmond's forecast. He also makes fun of Ted as news of the club's descent into the sewers go viral.

The team learns about Nate's comments, but as suggested by Jamie (Phil Dunster), they must "let it flow". Ted is called back by Rebecca, telling him he must fight back, as everyone is laughing at Richmond. During a press conference, Ted claims that he found Nate's comments "hilarious", wishing him good luck on his new position and mocking himself by listing a lot of his imperfections, which delights the reporters and Rebecca. Social media praises Ted and mocks Nate, frustrating him.

That night, Keeley and Roy (Brett Goldstein) inform his niece, Phoebe (Elodie Blomfield), that they have ended their relationship. Roy claims it is due to their busy schedules, but Keeley suggests something else is happening. At his apartment, Ted talks with Henry over the phone. Henry reveals that his mother's "friend", Jake, bought him an Infinity Gauntlet toy, which unsettles Ted.

== Development ==
=== Production ===
The episode was directed by MJ Delaney and written by co-executive producer Leann Bowen. This was Delaney's fifth directing credit, and Bowen's third writing credit for the show.

=== Set design ===
Production designer Paul Cripps worked with Sudeikis and set decorator Kate Goodman in setting the characters' personality in their spaces. For Keeley's offices, Sudeikis wanted to illustrate the tension between her corporate investors and her own individuality. Cripps described it as, "We felt like the best way to do that was the majority of the office would be an attempt to be tasteful, but quite a bland corporate look."

Rupert's office was inspired by Palpatine's throne room on the Death Star in Return of the Jedi. Cripps said, "wherever Rupert is, it's his empire, and he's the Dark Lord who's interfering all the time. I just thought, well, actually, why can't we make him an office that feels like the scene when Luke meets the Emperor?" For the look of the office, the crew built steps up, gold lights and a round window overlooking the stadium.

== Critical reviews ==
"Smells Like Mean Spirit" received generally positive reviews from critics. The review aggregator website Rotten Tomatoes reported a 100% approval rating for the episode, based on six reviews with an average rating of 7.3/10.

Manuel Betancourt of The A.V. Club gave the episode a "B+" and wrote, "I am happy to report that with its season three opener, 'Smells Like Mean Spirit', Apple TV+'s Emmy juggernaut has lost none of its luster. If anything, it's doubled (tripled?) down on its commitment to finding the funny in preaching against those who’d take pleasure in mean-spirited humor. This is what structures the episode, with Ted's classy, self-deprecating jokes shining over and against Nate's needless digs."

Alan Sepinwall of Rolling Stone wrote, "The season premiere has an early scene where Ted FaceTimes with his therapist, Dr. Sharon, and admits that he's not sure why he and Coach Beard are still in England. 'Maybe my being here is doing more hurting than helping at this point,' he admits. The remainder of the episode is such a long and clumsy chore that it seems fair to wonder if this is Sudeikis worrying that the series itself may have overstayed its welcome."

Keith Phipps of Vulture gave the episode a 4 star rating out of 5 and wrote, "Ted Lasso's third season has a lot of dangling threads left over from season two to attend to, and this premiere doesn't get to all of them. What, for instance, is going on with Sam and Rebecca? Or, for that matter, how are Sam's plans to launch a Nigerian restaurant going? Maybe they're going really well, and that's why Rebecca gave up vegetarianism? How are Beard and Jane doing? We'll have to wait to find out. Other threads get half-tended to. Jamie, still a seemingly reformed bad boy, has a role to play in 'Smells Like Mean Spirit', but his lingering feelings for Keeley remain unaddressed. The other two corners of the love triangle that might have existed only in Jamie's mind, however, are spending the evening together." Paull Dailly of TV Fanatic gave the episode a 4 star rating out of 5 and wrote, "All things considered, the premiere delivered in many ways, and I'm cautiously optimistic about the season ahead."

Lacy Baugher of Telltale TV gave the episode a 3 star rating out of 5 and wrote, "In the end, the Season 3 premiere is a mixed bag. There's a lot of table setting and far too little of the trademark comedic warmth that made so many of us fall in love with this show. But, the flashes of its trademark brilliance make me hopeful there's still reason to believe." Christopher Orr of The New York Times wrote, "Wow. The first episode of the third season of Ted Lasso — and I'm trying to summon my own inner Ted here — is a humdinger."
