= Midnight Train to Royston =

- Ted Lasso episode
- Episode no.: Season 2 Episode 11
- Directed by: MJ Delaney
- Written by: Sasha Garron
- Cinematography by: David Rom
- Editing by: Melissa McCoy
- Original release date: October 1, 2021
- Running time: 42 minutes

Guest appearances
- Toheeb Jimoh as Sam Obisanya; Sam Richardson as Edwin Akufo; Ruth Bradley as Mrs. Bowen; Cristo Fernández as Dani Rojas; Kola Bokinni as Isaac McAdoo; Annette Badland as Mae

Episode chronology
← Previous "No Weddings and a Funeral"	Next → "Inverting the Pyramid of Success"

"Midnight Train to Royston" is the eleventh episode of the second season of the American sports comedy-drama television series Ted Lasso, based on the character played by Jason Sudeikis in a series of promos for NBC Sports' coverage of England's Premier League. It is the 21st overall episode of the series and was written by Sasha Garron and directed by MJ Delaney. It was released on Apple TV+ on October 1, 2021.

The series follows Ted Lasso, an American college football coach, who is unexpectedly recruited to coach a fictional English Premier League soccer team, AFC Richmond, despite having no experience coaching soccer. The team's owner, Rebecca Welton, hires Lasso hoping he will fail as a means of exacting revenge on the team's previous owner, Rupert, her unfaithful ex-husband. The previous season saw Rebecca change her mind on the club's direction and working Ted in saving it, although the club is relegated from the Premier League. In the episode, a Ghanaian billionaire named Edwin Akufo takes an interest in buying Sam for an African soccer team he is assembling, putting Rebecca in a dire situation. Meanwhile, Ted finds that Sharon is leaving, while Nate accompanies Keeley in shopping after feeling his tactics do not get enough credit.

The episode received mixed-to-positive reviews from critics, who praised the performances and ending, but criticizing Rebecca's and Sam's romantic subplot as well as Keeley's subplot. For her performance in the episode, Juno Temple was nominated for Outstanding Supporting Actress in a Comedy Series at the 74th Primetime Emmy Awards. Additionally, Sam Richardson was nominated for Primetime Emmy Award for Outstanding Guest Actor in a Comedy Series nomination at the 74th Primetime Creative Arts Emmy Awards.

== Plot ==
During a game, Sam (Toheeb Jimoh) achieves his first hat-trick, although he is still distracted by his breakup with Rebecca (Hannah Waddingham). Meanwhile, Keeley (Juno Temple) is preparing for a photoshoot and profile by Vanity Fair about her business venture.

Higgins (Jeremy Swift) informs Rebecca that Edwin Akufo (Sam Richardson), a Ghanaian billionaire, called and may be interested in buying AFC Richmond. Akufo arrives in a helicopter and reveals that he does not intend to buy the club, he actually wants to buy Sam's contract. While the club does not want to trade Sam, Akufo states that Sam may want to play in a team close to his home. Akufo tells Sam that he will buy Raja Casablanca and sign all talented African soccer players, intending to eventually get Africa a FIFA World Cup. He gives Sam three days to consider his offer. Ted supports whatever Sam decides, while Rebecca tells Ted of her affair with Sam. Meanwhile, Nate (Nick Mohammed) feels frustrated that Ted is given credit for tactics that he develops, although Roy (Brett Goldstein) and Beard (Brendan Hunt) tell him that's part of being an assistant coach.

Sharon (Sarah Niles) is about to leave her position at Richmond, but Ted is frustrated when she leaves the day before her official final day. He meets her at her apartment and scolds her for leaving without saying goodbye. He gives her the gift of cash collected by the team. Claiming she is not good at goodbyes, she insists he read the letter she left him, which leaves Ted emotionally moved. He takes her for a drink at the pub to bid her farewell.

Keeley takes Nate to shop for an elegant new suit. He surprises Keeley by kissing her and then apologizes for his behavior. During the photoshoot, Keeley admits to Roy that Nate kissed her. Roy does not seem bothered and tells her that he spent three hours with Phoebe's teacher, indicating he liked her attention. Keeley then confesses that Jamie told her he still loves her at the funeral, which makes them uncomfortable during the rest of the photoshoot.

Rebecca meets Sam outside his home and tells him she hopes he does not go, leaving him confused. Back home, Ted receives texts from Trent Crimm stating that an article will be published the next day in which an anonymous source reveals that Ted suffered a panic attack during the game against Tottenham Hotspur F.C. While Trent felt that, as a journalist, he had to submit the story, he reveals that the anonymous source was Nate.

== Development ==
=== Production ===
The episode was directed by MJ Delaney and written by Sasha Garron. This was Delaney's fourth directing credit, and Garron's first writing credit for the show.

== Critical reviews ==
"Midnight Train to Royston" received mixed-to-positive reviews from critics. Myles McNutt of The A.V. Club gave the episode a "B-" and wrote, "Given how much trust I held in the show at the end of the first season, it's deeply disappointing to leave 'Midnight Train to Royston' feeling so at odds with the show's priorities, and its understanding of the stories being told. For me, it's not as simple as a lack of focus on the football elements of the series, or the tonal swings as we dig deeper into the characters' pain, or the fiction that a Nigerian player who loses a game protesting a sponsor would only benefit from doing so. It's the intangible feeling that there are dimensions to these stories that are being left behind or elided for reasons that I don't understand, which is all the more distressing for a show that I was so in tune with last year."

Alan Sepinwall of Rolling Stone wrote, "We have Nate, who was one of the great success stories of Ted's generosity and encouragement a season ago, doing something unforgivable by revealing private, sensitive mental-health information about a colleague to a member of the press. It's a story I'm excited to see pay off in the finale. The other conflicts advanced by 'Midnight Train to Royston', much less so."

Keith Phipps of Vulture gave the episode a 4 star rating out of 5 and wrote, "If we assume that this dark phase in Nate's life is just that, a phase, it's a scene in which a socially awkward person has his worst fears about interacting with others confirmed by Keeley's rejection. But can we assume it’s just a phase?" Becca Newton of TV Fanatic gave the episode a 4.3 star rating out of 5 and wrote, "Did the ending make you want to swear like Roy Kent? That's the thing about tragedy. You know it's coming, and it still hurts like hell when it happens."

Linda Holmes of NPR wrote, "We have one episode to go in this season. There is a lot to get done. The team has to wrap up its season, and Sam has to decide whether to leave, and two love plots need addressing, and oh yes, we have to deal with Nate and his apparent heel turn, and with whatever it has to do with Rupert. Friends, I am concerned." Christopher Orr of The New York Times wrote, "I've come to expect Ted Lasso's oddly dismissive approach toward the finer points of soccer. But now journalism, too?"

=== Awards and accolades ===
Juno Temple submitted this episode for consideration for her Primetime Emmy Award for Outstanding Supporting Actress in a Comedy Series nomination at the 74th Primetime Emmy Awards. She lost the award to Sheryl Lee Ralph in Abbott Elementary.

Additionally, Sam Richardson was nominated for Primetime Emmy Award for Outstanding Guest Actor in a Comedy Series nomination at the 74th Primetime Creative Arts Emmy Awards. He lost the award to Nathan Lane in Only Murders in the Building.
