= Retallack =

Coordinates: 50.456°N 4.912°W

Retallack village: Cornish: Res'helyk
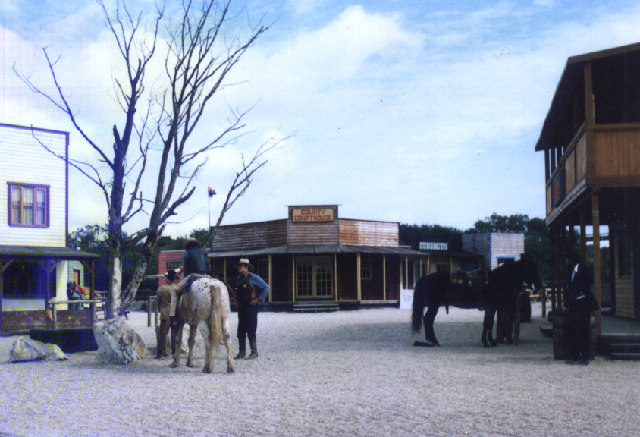
- Spirit of the West Theme Park, Retallack

- Location within Cornwall
- OS grid reference: SW934658
- Civil parish: St Wenn
- Unitary authority: Cornwall
- Ceremonial county: Cornwall
- Region: South West
- Country: England
- Sovereign state: United Kingdom
- Post town: St Columb
- Postcode district: TR9
- Dialling code: 01637

Retallack village is near St Columb Major, in Cornwall, England, UK, and in the civil parish of St Wenn.

Most of the village was turned into a 100-acre commercial theme park called "Spirit of the West". The theme park opened in 1989 under the name Frontier City on what was originally a 34-acre site. The attraction was created by Malcolm Stuart Warriner, who was one of its business partners and a Western reenactor portraying the town sheriff, JB. The Spirit of the West closed in 2009 and was redeveloped into holiday lodges, which use the name Retallack Resort & Spa.

Outer Retallick (sic) is another village 1 km to the northwest of the village of Winnards Perch, which was destroyed to make way for a nearby highway roundabout.

Retallack is also a Cornish surname. The name can be traced back to the location near St Columb. John Retallack, listed as a local farmer living at Retallack in 1602. Other Cornish localities named for this family include Retillick Farm (sic) near Roche (SW 974593), Retallack Farm near Constantine (SW 733304), and Retallack Mine near Millpool (SW 573314) Other Cornish places called Retallack also exist: these are in St Hilary and Constantine. while Retallick is in Roche. Though the modern forms are the same the earlier forms show that the original meanings are different. This Retallack and the nearby Retallick have the meaning "ford by willow trees".

== Gallery ==
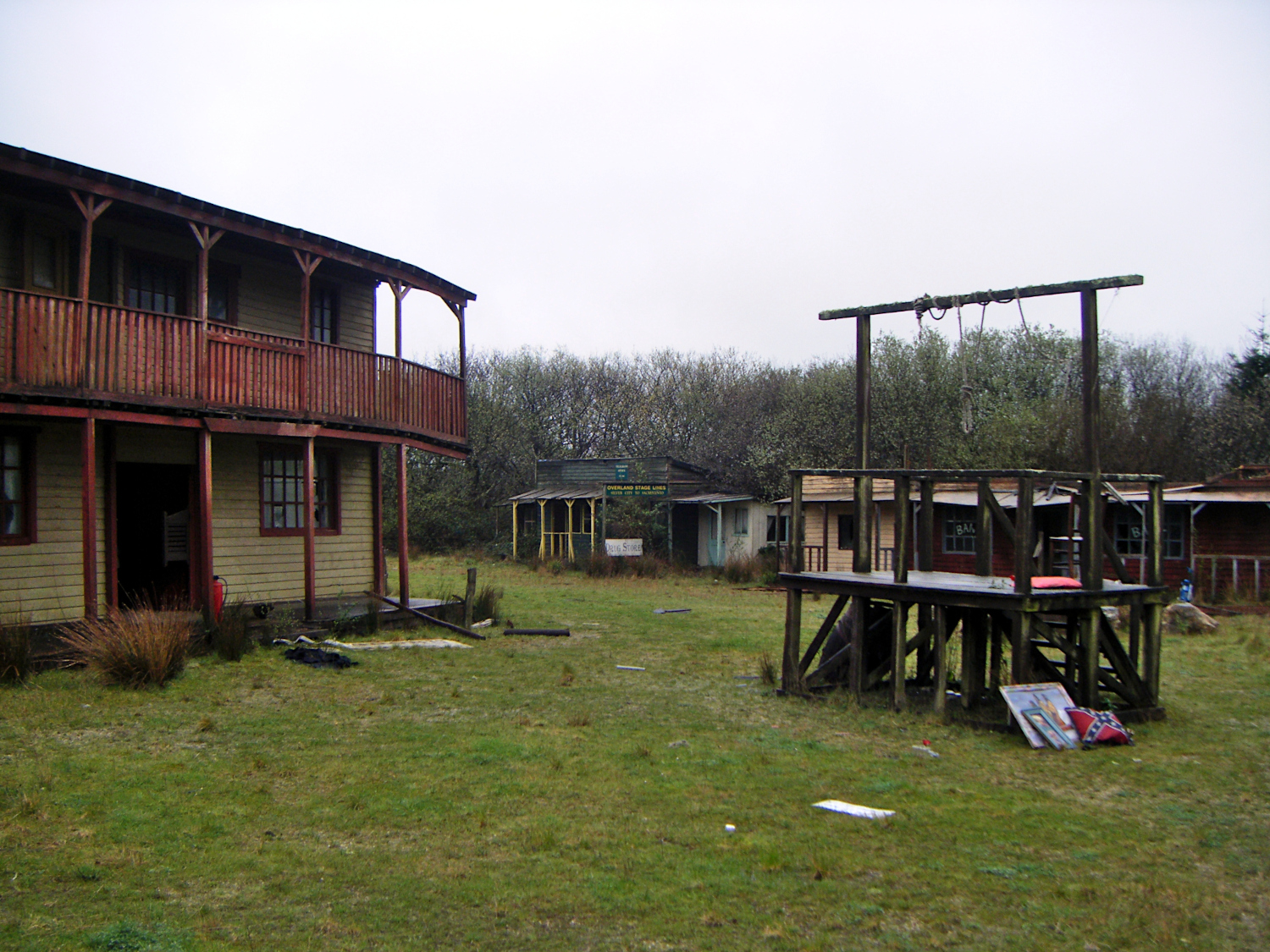
The derelict Spirit of the West theme park in 2014, five years after its closure.

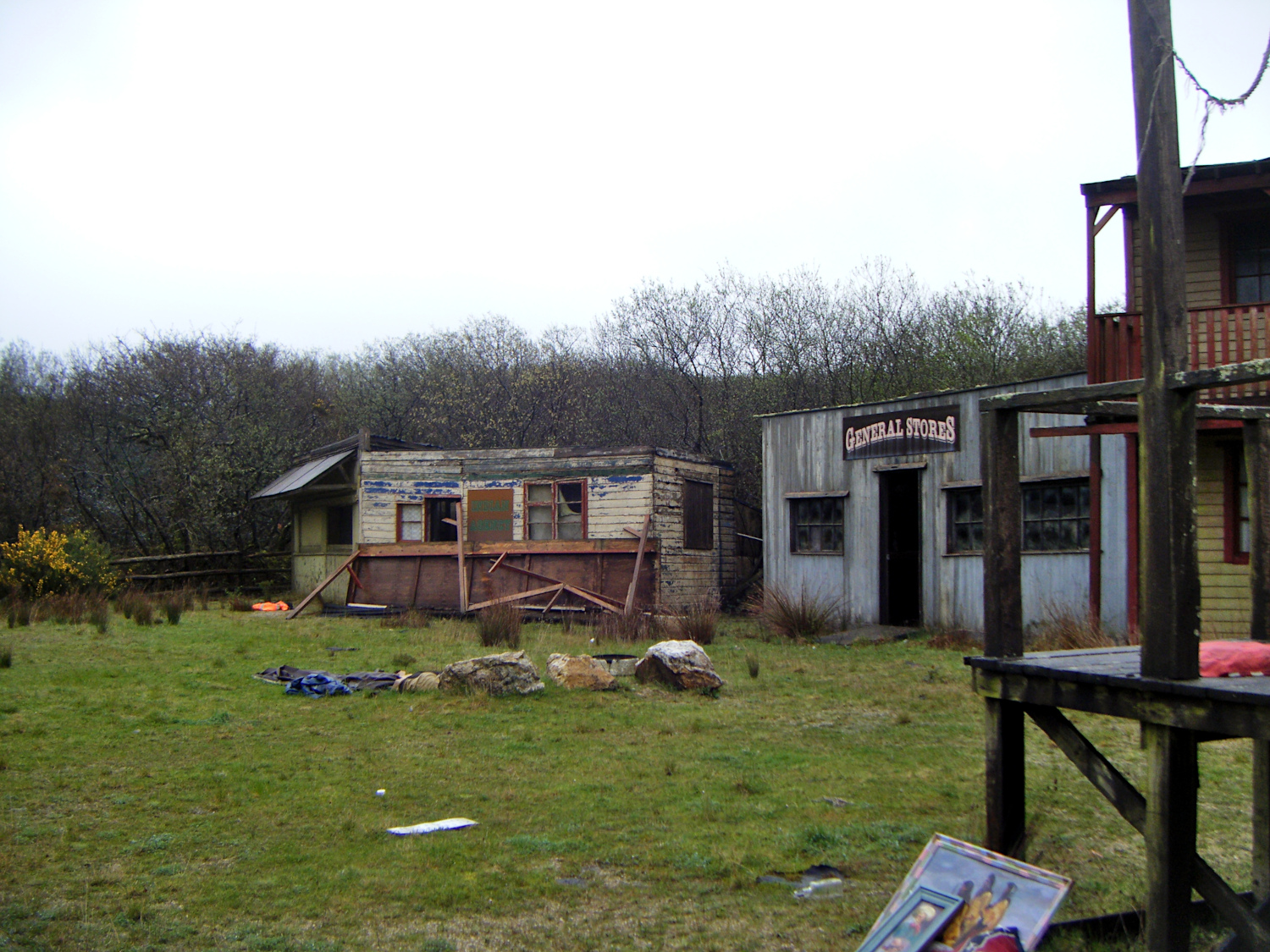
