= John Retallack =

British playwright and director (born 1950)

John Retallack (born 1950) is a British playwright and director.

== Education ==
He studied at St Paul's School in London (1963–68) and later at St Paul's College of Education, Cheltenham, Gloucestershire, where he took the Double English course (aimed at future secondary school English teachers) for his C.Ed. qualification (awarded summer 1973), and English and Education for his B.Ed. (awarded summer 1974). At St Paul's he was already active in the arts, organising a number of literary events during his stay.

== Career ==
He is the author of twelve plays for young people and has adapted numerous texts for the stage and for radio.

Oberon Books published four of his plays for Company of Angels (Hannah & Hanna, Risk, Club Asylum and Virgins). Methuen publish Sweetpeter. His plays have been translated and published in several languages and are performed in Germany, Austria, Sweden, Holland and France.

He was the founding director of ATC Theatre (1977–85) which continues today as a National Portfolio client of the Arts Council of England.

John was formerly director of Oldham Coliseum Theatre (1985–88) and Oxford Stage Company (1989–99) where his adaptation of Melvin Burgess’s Junk won the TMA Young People's Award in 1998. His Shakespeare productions for Oxford Stage Company toured internationally and won widespread critical acclaim over a period of ten years.

From 2001- 2011 he was the founding director of Company of Angels, now operating under the name Boundless Theatre, which produces new and experimental work for young audiences and continues today as a National Portfolio client of the Arts Council of England.

From 2010 - 2013, he was Associate Director at Bristol Old Vic where he remains Artistic Associate.

In 2013, he became Tutor in Writing for Performance at Ruskin College in Oxford.

In 2015, he will revive his 2014 production of DIDO & AENEAS for Bristol Old Vic/English Concert and spend two months with the 'reseau europeen des centres culturels de rencontre' at La Chartreuse de Neuville in France researching a play about the current plight of refugees in Calais.

== Awards ==
- 1978:Edinburgh Festival Fringe First
- 1983: Laurence Olivier Award for Best Newcomer in a Play
- 1998: TMA Young People's Award
- 2001: Herald Angel at the 2001 Edinburgh Festival
- 2010: Herald Angel at the 2010 Edinburgh Festival

== Works ==
Early adaptations for ATC

1978 - 80 Don Juan (adaptation from Byron's poem) ATC National tour Edinburgh Festival Avignon Festival Fringe First Award International tour with British Council

1981 - 83 Don Quixote parts 1 & 2 with Richard Curtis (adaptation from the novel) ATC National Tour Edinburgh Festival Almeida & Donmar Warehouse Olivier Award International tour with British Council to over 20 countries including New York

1982 - 83 Berlin Berlin (adaptation from Robert Musil's The Man Without Qualities) Edinburgh Festival ATC National tour International tour with British Council including Berlin

1983 Ubu The Vandalist (adaptation from Alfred Jarry's plays) ATC National Tour Edinburgh Festival International tour with British Council

1985 Hamlet National Drama Conservatoire, New Delhi (for British Council)

Adaptations for Oxford Stage Company

(1989 – 1999 Directed 14 plays by Shakespeare Oxford Stage Company National tours throughout UK International tours to Japan and Far East)

1998 Junk (adaptation of Melvyn Burgess’ novel) Oxford Stage Company 1998/2000 Oxford Playhouse & National Tour 1999 Winner of TMA award/ Best New Show for Young People 1999 2000 Bergen Theatre, Norway Published by Methuen

2000 The Plague (adaptation of Camus’ novel) Dundee Rep

Company of Angels

2001 Hannah and Hanna Company of Angels tour in UK and Edinburgh 2001 - 2003 Edinburgh Festival Winner of Herald Angel Award TMA Award/Best New Show for Young People nominee 2004 – 2005 British Council tours to India, Malaysia and The Philippines 2002—World Service radio Published by Oberon, English Centre, Frenchs and Editions Fontaine Translated & produced in French, Swedish, German, Dutch, Portuguese, Hebrew & Japanese Over 200 performances in Sweden and 100 in Belgium

2002 The Toll Bridge (adaptation of Aidan Chamber's novel) Reading at Soho Theatre

2002/2013 Wild Girl 2002 Company of Angels/ Quicksilver tour 2004 Wederzijds tour of Holland & Belgium 2004 Runner-up/Hans Snoek Award, Amsterdam 2013 Bristol Old Vic tour in co-production with Theatre Royal, Bath, Dukes Playhouse, Lancaster and Theatre Iolo, Cardiff Translated & produced in French and Dutch

2002 Club Asylum Company of Angels tour of Scotland Tron Theatre Glasgow Published by Oberon Translated in French

2003 The Foundling Brighton Theatre Company tour of South-East

2003 Common Ground Cardboard Citizens tour for homeless people in London

2004 Ballroom National Tour Riverside Studios London Translated in French

2004 Sweetpeter (with Usifu Jalloh) Company of Angels National Tour Polka Theatre London Translated & performed in French Published by Methuen

2005 Virgins Company of Angels National Tour Edinburgh Festival Translated and performed in French, Swedish, German Published by Oberon Over 150 performances in Sweden

2006 Risk Company of Angels Scottish & English tour Tron Theatre Glasgow Translated and performed in French and German Published by Oberon and Les Solitaires Intempestifs 2008 Theater an der Parkaue Berlin 2012 Compagnie L’Interlude Tour of France 2013 Avignon Festival

2007 A Bridge to the Stars Cottesloe Theatre National Theatre Connections Festival 2008 Radio 4 Afternoon play

2009 Apples (Adapted from Richard Milward's novel) Company of Angels & Northern Stage Newcastle National Tour Edinburgh Festival Winner of Herald Angel Award

2010 Arlo Public Reading for Company of Angels Theatre Café Southwark Playhouse

2011 Truant National Theatre of Scotland & Company of Angels Glasgow tour

2012 Pictures at an Exhibition Bristol Old Vic Young Company

2013 The Last Days of Mankind with Toby Hulse (adapted from original text by Karl Kraus) Bristol Old Vic/Bristol Old Vic Theatre School

2013 The Outsider (adapted from Albert Camus’ novel) Radio 3 90 minute broadcast on centenary of Camus’ birth 3.11.13

Arlo Radio 4 Afternoon Play 26.11.13
