= Maya Arad Yasur =

Israeli playwright (born 1976)

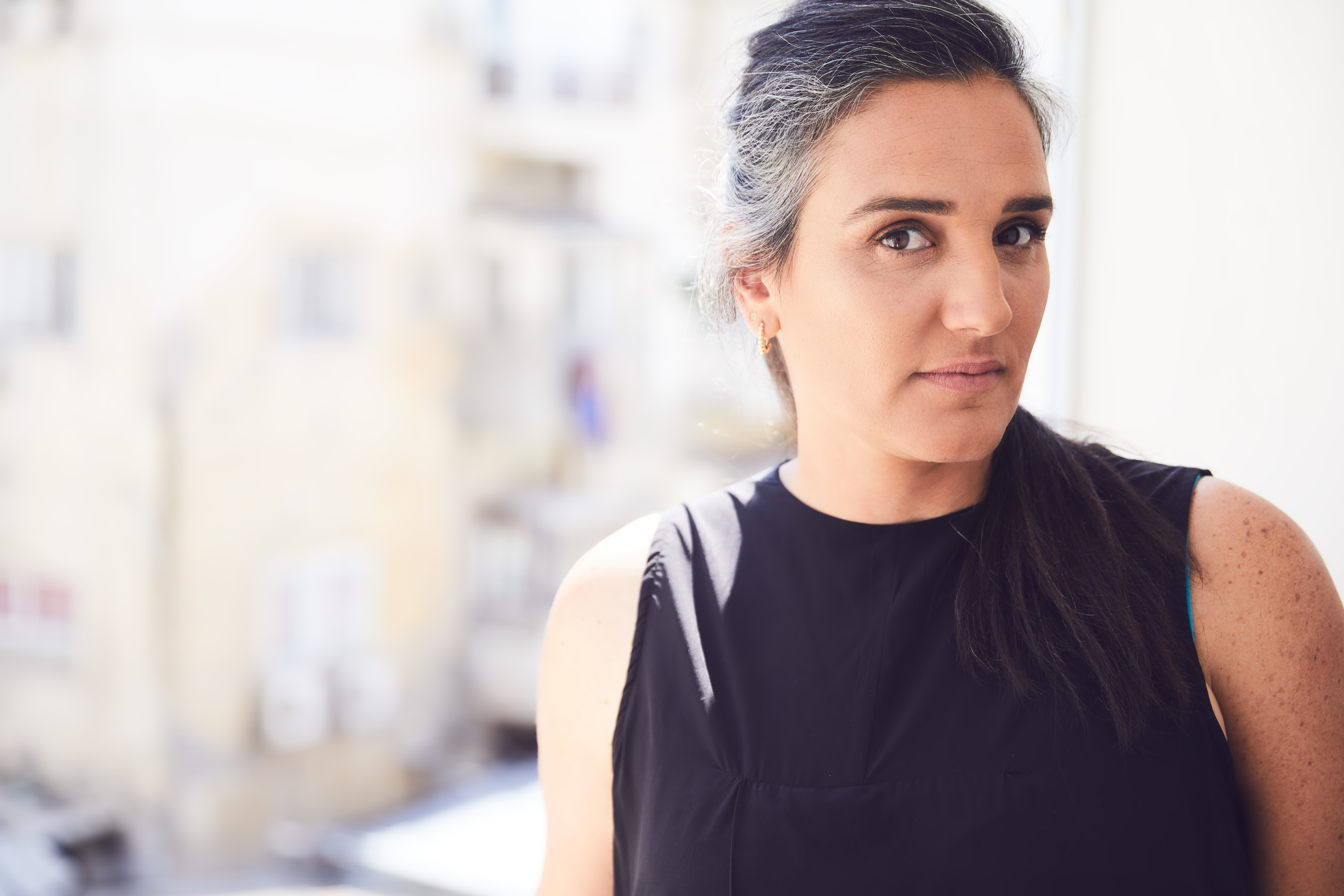
- Maya Arad Yasur by Liron Weissman
- Born: 1976 (age 49–50); Ramat Gan, Israel
- Education: Hebrew University of Jerusalem; University of Amsterdam; Tel-Aviv University
- Occupation: Playwright

Maya Arad Yasur (Hebrew: מאיה ערד יסעור; born 1976) is an Israeli playwright. Yasur's works have been produced worldwide, translated to over thirteen languages and are published in Chinese, English, French, German, Hebrew, Russian, Italian and Polish. She is the recipient of the Theatertreffen's Stückemarkt prize 2018. Yasur is known for her knotty and complex form of fractured narratives.

== Early life ==
Yasur was born in the Israeli city of Ramat Gan and went to high school in Tel-Aviv, majoring in Film and Photography, she went on to the Hebrew University of Jerusalem where she studied theatre, communication and journalism studies. She holds a master's degree in dramaturgy from the University of Amsterdam where she graduated with distinction and a PhD in theatre studies from Tel-Aviv University.

== Career ==
Yasur's plays have been staged and publicly read in various theatres in Israel, France, the UK, Germany, Austria, Serbia, Slovenia, Cyprus, Norway, Finland and the U.S. Yasur worked as the dramaturg on several performances by Serbian-Dutch theatre-maker Sanja Mitrović and was the dramaturg of the series Het Beloofde Feest by the Dutch theatre-maker Ilay den Boer. Her play Amsterdam received its English language premier at the Orange Tree Theatre in London in 2019, produced by the Actors Touring Company, an extensive UK tour followed. Lyn Gardner admired the bravado of the fractured structure which mixed thriller with a multitude of voices and likened the use of unstable perspectives to Prebble's A Very Expensive Poison.

=== Plays ===
- How to Remain a Humanist after a Massacre in 17 Steps, directed by Sapir Heller, 2023.
- Triage opened at Beit Lessin Theatre in Tel-Aviv in January 2023 directed by Ilan Ronen.
- The Exiteers (Blaue Stille) opened at Landestheater Schwaben Memmingen Germany in October 2020, directed by Sapir Heller.
- BOMB - Variations on Refusal opened at the Schauspiel Theatre Cologne in 2020, directed by Lily Sykes.
- God Waits at the Station opened at Habima – Israel's national theatre in 2014, at Volkstheater Vienna in 2015 at the Schauspiel Dresden in 2016 and at the Theater Paderborn in 2017. It had a staged reading at AdK Berlin.
- Ten Minutes from Home opened at Habima - Israel's national Theatre in 2015.
- Suspended opened at Upstream Theatre in St. Louis in 2016 and received its German premiere at Deutsches Theater Göttingen (October 2018).
- Amsterdam premiered at the Haifa Theater (Israel) July 2018, Volkstheater Munich (Feb. 2019).

=== Production history ===
- 2024: How to Remain a Humanist after a Massacre in 17 Steps, Schauspiel Dresden, Germany
- 2024: How to Remain a Humanist after a Massacre in 17 Steps, Jaffa Theatre, Israel
- 2024: Gott Wartet an der Haltestelle (God Waits at the Station), Theater Heilbronn, Germany
- 2023: How to Remain a Humanist after a Massacre in 17 Steps, Landestheater Württemberg-Hohenzollern Tübingen and various theatres around Germany (dir. Sapir Heller)
- 2023: Amsterdam, Deutsches Theater Göttingen
- 2023: Bomb - Variations on Refusal, Theater Lübeck, Germany.
- 2023: Gott Wartet an der Haltestelle (God Waits at the Station), Theater Kiel, Germany.
- 2023: Triage, Beit Lessin Theatre, Tel-Aviv.
- 2022: Amsterdam, Oldenburgisches Staatstheater, Oldenburg, Germany
- 2022: Amsterdam, Theater Nestroyhof, Vienna
- 2022: Amsterdam, Le menteur volontaire, France
- 2022: Amsterdam, Staatstheater Darmstadt
- 2021: Amsterdam, Hessisches Landestheater Marburg, Germany
- 2020 : Blaue Stille, Landestheater Schwaben Memmingen, Germany
- 2020 : Bomb, Schauspiel Cologne, Germany
- 2019 : Amsterdam, Scene Dock Theatre, Los Angeles, USA.
- 2019: Amsterdam, Orange Tree Theatre, UK
- 2019 : Amsterdam, Theater Kiel, Germany
- 2019: Amsterdam : Festival LA MOUSSON D’ÉTÉ, France (staged reading)
- 2019: Amsterdam, Regards Croises Festival, Grenoble (staged reading)
- 2019: Amsterdam, Volkstheater Munich
- 2019: Suspended, Thalia Theater, Hamburg
- 2018: Suspended, Deutsches Theater Göttingen
- 2018: Amsterdam, Haifa Theater
- 2017: Gott Wartet an der Haltestelle, Theater Paderborn
- 2016: Gott Wartet an der Haltestelle, Staatsschauspiel Dresden
- 2016: Suspended, Upstream Theatre, St. Louis, USA.
- 2015: Ten Minutes from Home, Habima –Israel's National Theatre
- 2015: Gott Wartet an der Haltestelle, AdK Berlin (staged reading)
- 2015: Gott Wartet an der Haltestelle, Volkstheater Wien
- 2014: God Waits at the Station, Habima –Israel's National Theatre
- 2012: Diamond Stars, The Blank Theater, Los Angeles (staged reading)
- 2011: Diamond Stars, Det Norske Teatret, Oslo (staged reading)

=== Published works ===
- How to Remain a Humanist after a Massacre in 17 Steps, Cora Magazine, 2024 (Swedish)
- How to Remain a Humanist after a Massacre in 17 Steps, Haaretz, 2023 (Hebrew)
- God Waits at the Station. Theater der Zeit, 2016 (German)
- God Waits at the Station Dialog, 2017 (Polish)
- Suspended. Theater: periodical for contemporary theater, 2018 (Hebrew)
- Focalizing Bodies: Visual Narratology in the Post-Dramatic Theatre. (English) ISBN 978-3-8288-2623-6
- Amsterdam. translated by Eran Edry. London: Nick Hern Books, 2019. ISBN 978-1848428898
- Amsterdam. translated by Laurence Sendrowicz. Paris: Éditions Théâtrales, 2019. ISBN 978-2-84260-818-7
- Suspended. translated by Guan Hui. In New Drama publication. Shanghai: Office of New Drama, 2019. ISSN 1003-8043
- Amsterdam translated by Sarah Kaminski and Maria Teresa Milano. Rome: Modern Times Publishers, 2021. ISBN 979-12-80667-04-5

=== Dramaturgical work ===
- 2021: Salomonsoordeel, tgilay (dir. Ilay den Boer), Holland
- 2012: Everyone Expects to Grow Old but No One Expects to Get Fired, European Capital of Culture, Teater Oficinia Guimaraes, Stand Up Tall Productions (dir.Sanja Mitrovic), Portugal
- 2012: Crash Course Chit Chat, Huis a/d Werf, Stand Up Tall Productions (dir.Sanja Mitrovic), Utrecht, Holland
- 2012: Broer, Festival Over het Ij, Amsterdam
- 2011: Zoek het Lekker Zelf Uit!, Het huis van Bourgondie and Het Lab Utrecht. Premiere at Festival a/d Werf, Utrecht, the Netherlands. Winner of The Silver Cricket award
- 2011: DayDream House, Festival a/d Werf, Stand Up Tall Productions (dir.Sanja Mitrovic), Utrecht, the Netherlands
- 2010: A Short History of Crying, Hetveem Theater, Stand Up Tall Productions (dir.Sanja Mitrovic), Amsterdam, the Netherlands
- 2010: Dit is mijn vader, Het huis van Bourgondie. Selected for the Netherlands Theater Festival 2010 (Best 10 performances of the year in Holland and Belgium) and won the BNG award 2011
- 2009: Janken en Schieten, Over Het Ij Festival Amsterdam and Het huis van Bourgondie Maastricht

== Awards and honours ==
- 1st prize of the international playwriting competition of ITI–UNESCO for Suspended (2011)
- Habima (Israel's national theatre) prize for emerging playwrights for God Waits at the Station (2014)
- The Berliner Theatertreffen's Stückemarkt prize for Amsterdam (2018)
- The Tel-Aviv Rosenblum Award for performing Arts (2022)
