= Greenwich+Docklands International Festival =

Annual performing arts festival in London, England

Greenwich+Docklands International Festival (GDIF)
- Location: Royal Greenwich Tower Hamlets
- Founded: 1996
- Founded by: Bradley Hemmings MBE
- Artistic director: Bradley Hemmings MBE
- Type of plays: Multidisciplinary (theatre, dance, music)
- Festival date: June–July
- Website: http://www.festival.org

The Greenwich+Docklands International Festival (GDIF) is a free annual outdoor performing arts festival, which takes place across East (Tower Hamlets) and South East London (Greenwich) every summer. Greenwich+Docklands International Festival was founded by Artistic Director Bradley Hemmings in 1996 and is produced by the charitable organisation Festival.org. The festival brings together a programme of UK and international events taking place across 17 days, encompassing large-scale spectacle, theatre, circus and dance.

== Founding ==
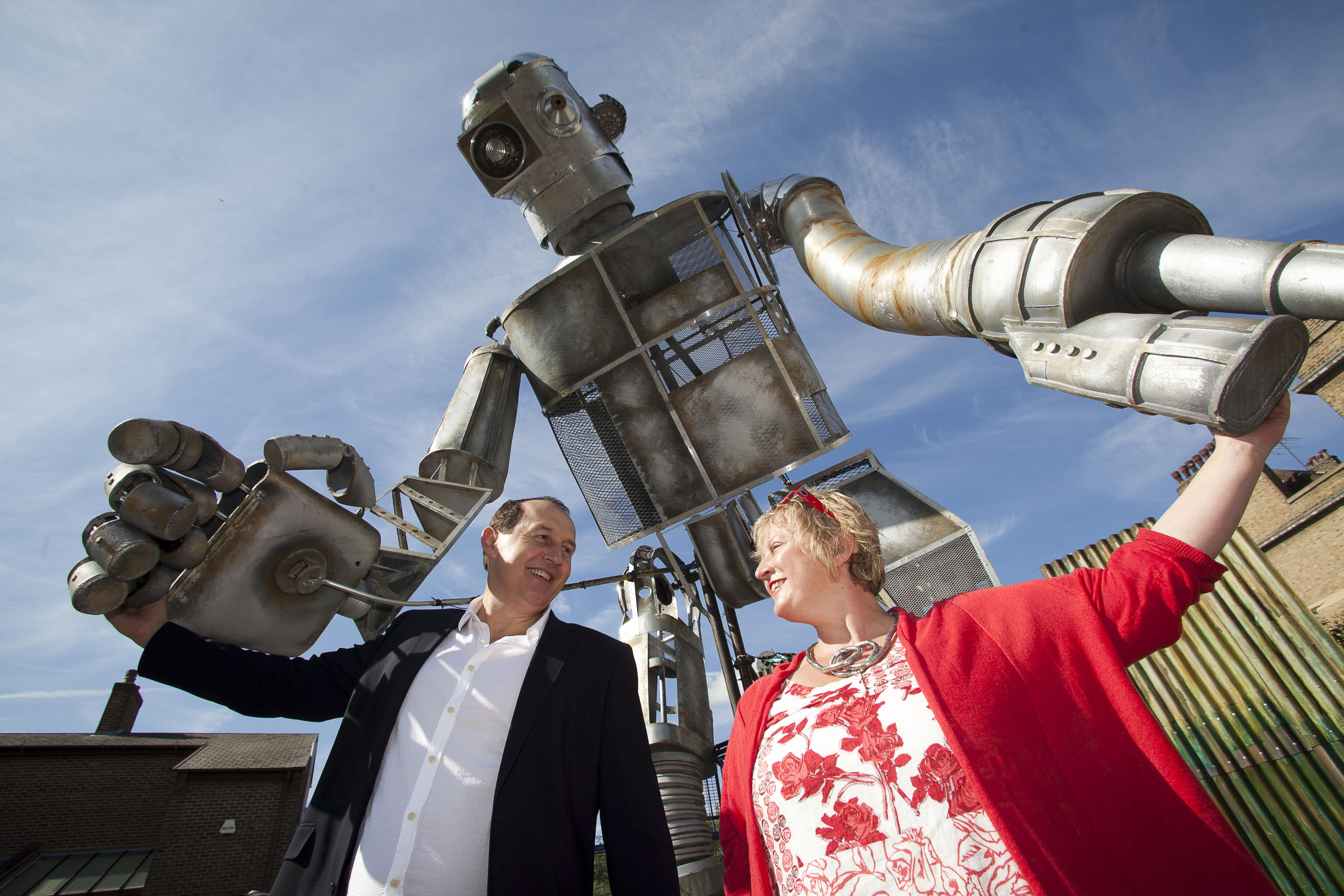
GDIF's Artistic Director Bradley Hemmings and Graeae's Artistic Director Jenny Sealey appointed leading artistic directors for London 2012 Paralympic Games Opening Ceremony (24 June 2011)

The Greenwich+Docklands International Festival was founded by Artistic Director Bradley Hemmings as an independent festival in 1996. The Festival developed out of the former Greenwich Festival into a cross-river festival.

Hemmings also performed as Co-Artistic Director of the Paralympic Opening Ceremony 2012 in London together with Jenny Sealey from Graeae Theatre Company.

== Festival programme ==
The festival produces site-specific outdoor performances across the breadth of South East London and the City of London. Notable areas where GDIF present work annually include Thamesmead, Woolwich, Greenwich, Newham, Royal Docks, Canary Wharf and The City of London.

Performances include small to large-scale theatrical and acrobatic shows by national and international artists. GDIF has a tradition of presenting large-scale spectacular shows and ceremonies such as Graeae's and La Fura dels Baus' Prometheus Awakes (2012; Spain/UK), Compagnie Off's Les Girafes (2011; France), Free Art's Voala (2010; Spain), Close Act's Pi-Leau (2009; Netherlands), Periplum's and The World Famous's The Bell (2008; UK), Strange Fruit's Absolute Pearl (2007; Australia), Borealis (2021, UK), Spark (2022, The Netherlands) and Resurgam (2023, USA).

GDIF also features two mini-festivals within its programme Greenwich Fair, which brings together a mix of street arts and theatre for a family-friendly day of outdoor arts in Greenwich Town Centre whilst Dancing City, an annual celebration of contemporary dance takes place in the urban environment of Canary Wharf. Dancing City is part of the international Dancing Cities network.

Events address local and global issues through art, such as Woman Life Freedom (2023), a physical theatre piece addressing human rights violations in Iran, and The Architect (2023) an immersive theatre piece taking place on a moving double-decker bus in Greenwich and Deptford, which celebrated the legacy of local teenager Stephen Lawrence who was murdered in a racist attack in 1993.

GDIF aims to make theatre and the arts more accessible for deaf, disabled and neurodivergent artists and audiences. In 2023 the festival became the first festival in the UK to be awarded a Platinum status by the accessibility charity Attitude is Everything.

Two of the shows produced for GDIF2012, Prometheus Awakes and Crow) and GDF's production of Close Act's Pi-Leau in Hastings (23 June 2012) were part of the London 2012 Festival, the Cultural Olympiad accompanying the Olympic Games in London. GDIF takes place in Greenwich and Tower Hamlets, both Olympic host boroughs.

=== Outdoor performing arts ===
Since 2011 the festival also hosts London's annual showcase of outdoor theatre with over 150 national and international delegates attending and up to 40 companies presenting. The list of companies showcasing at GDIF 2012 included:

- 11:18
- BiDiNG TiME
- Chadwick Song Theatre]
- Circ Pànic
- Circus Diaspora
- curious directive
- Dans La Poche
- D'irque & Fien
- Gijs van Bon
- Graeae
- Handspring Puppet Company UK
- High Hearted Theatre
- Inua Ellams
- Itinerània
- Kazzum
- La Fura dels Baus
- Les Enfants Terribles
- Ljud
- Low
- Marco Neri & Luca Regina
- Mimbre
- nabokov
- Orange
- PanGottic Circus-Theatre
- Plunge Boom
- RashDash
- Requardt & Rosenberg
- Sarruga
- StopGAP Dance Company
- tangled feet
- Whalley Range All Stars

== Gallery ==
GDIF2012

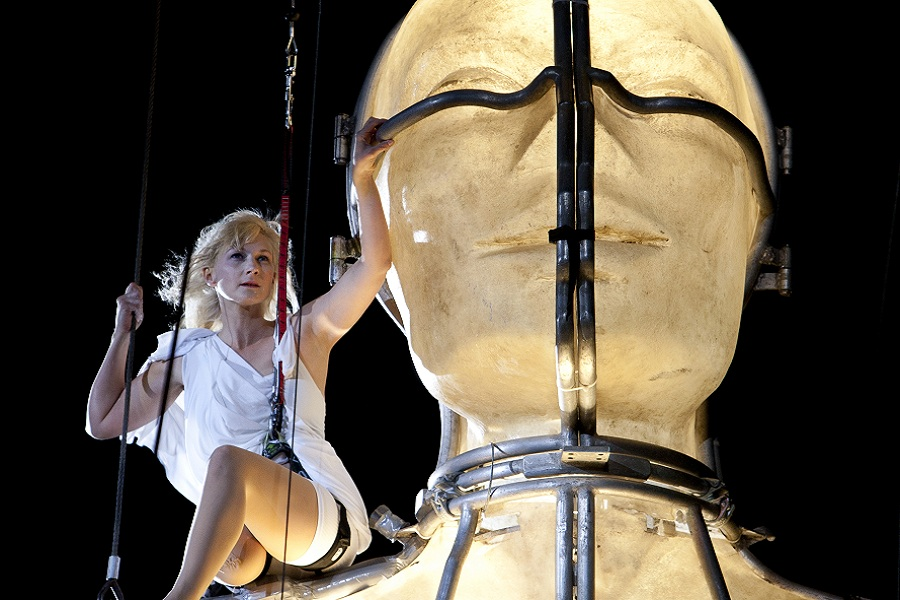
Prometheus Awakes

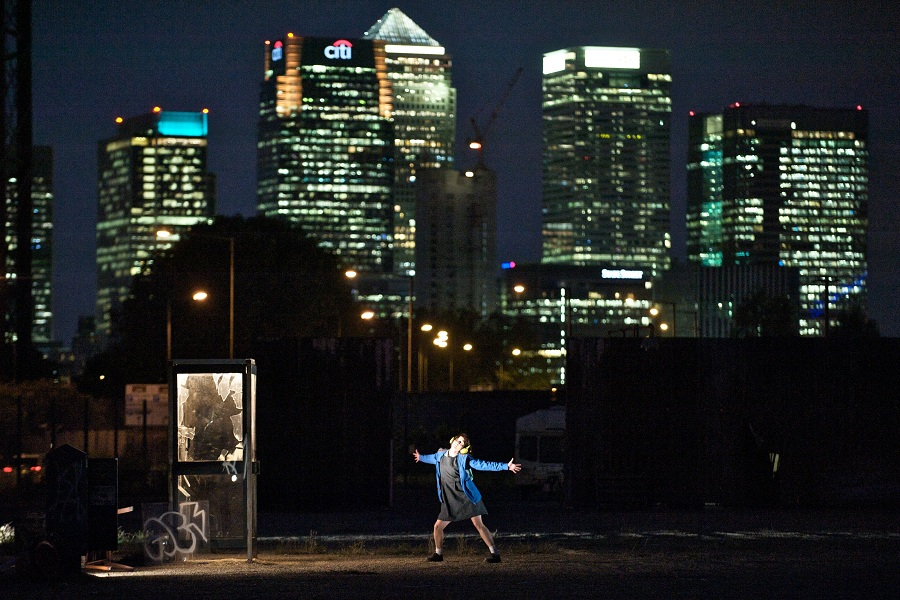
Motor Show

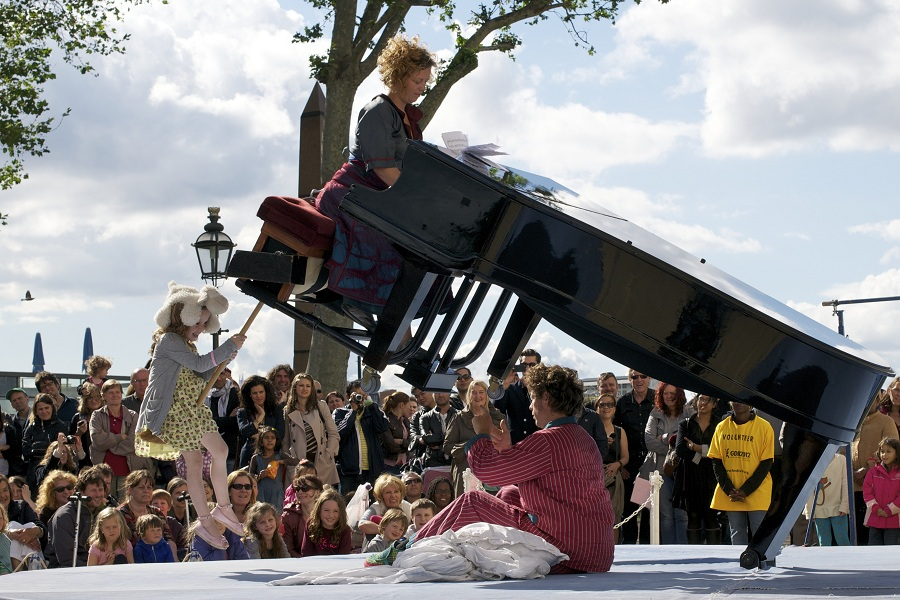
Carrousel des Moutons

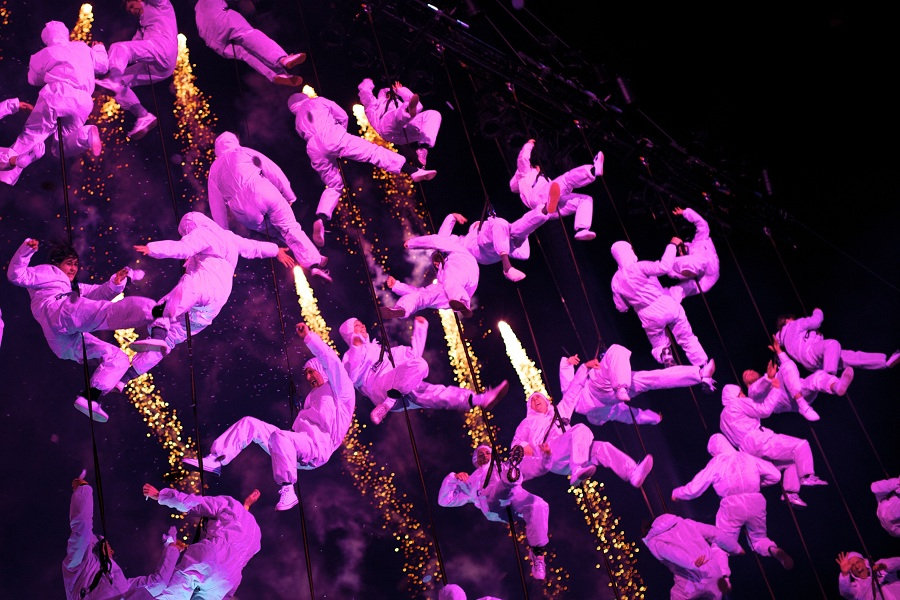
Prometheus Awakes
GDIF2011

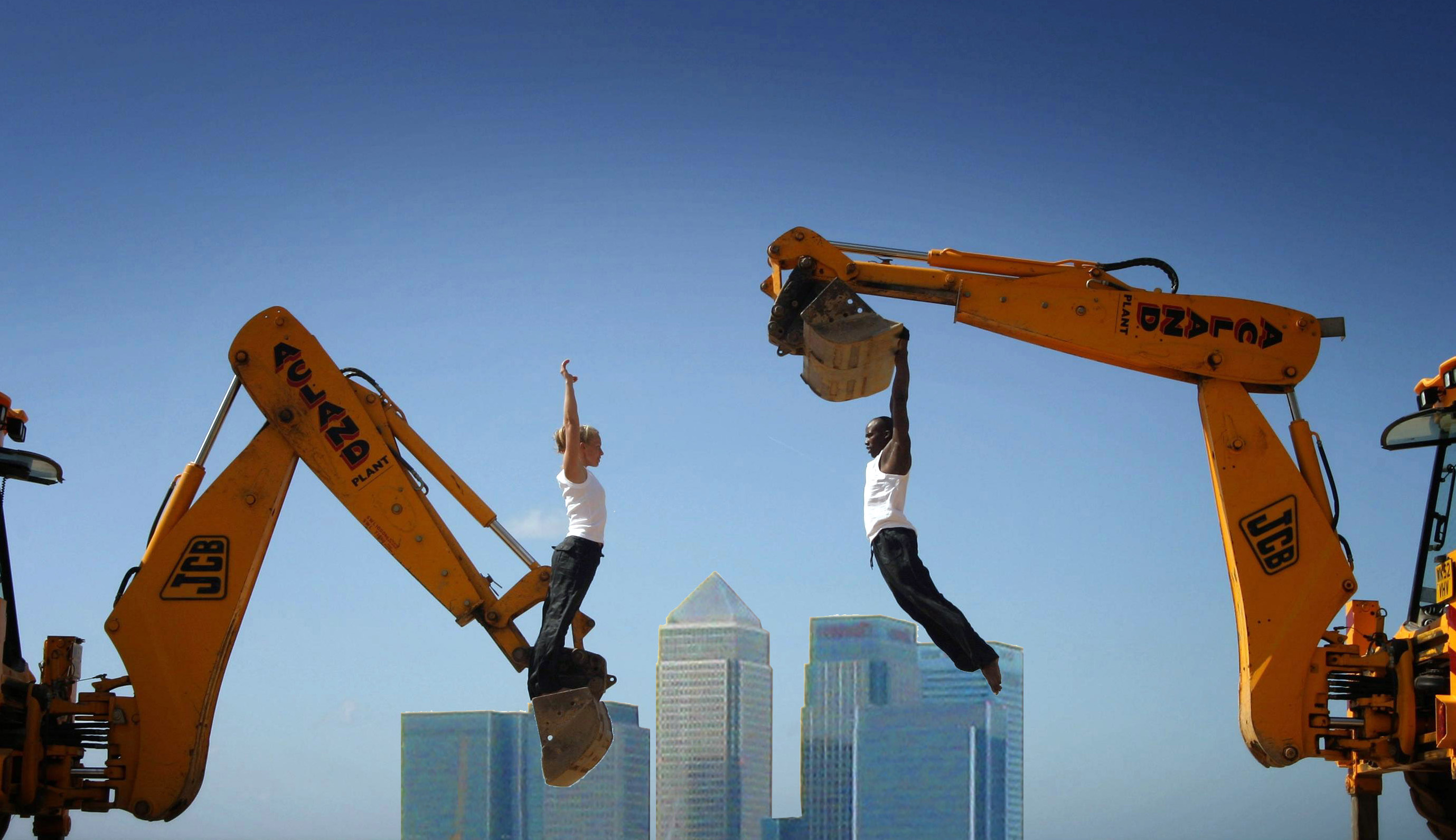
Waiting Game

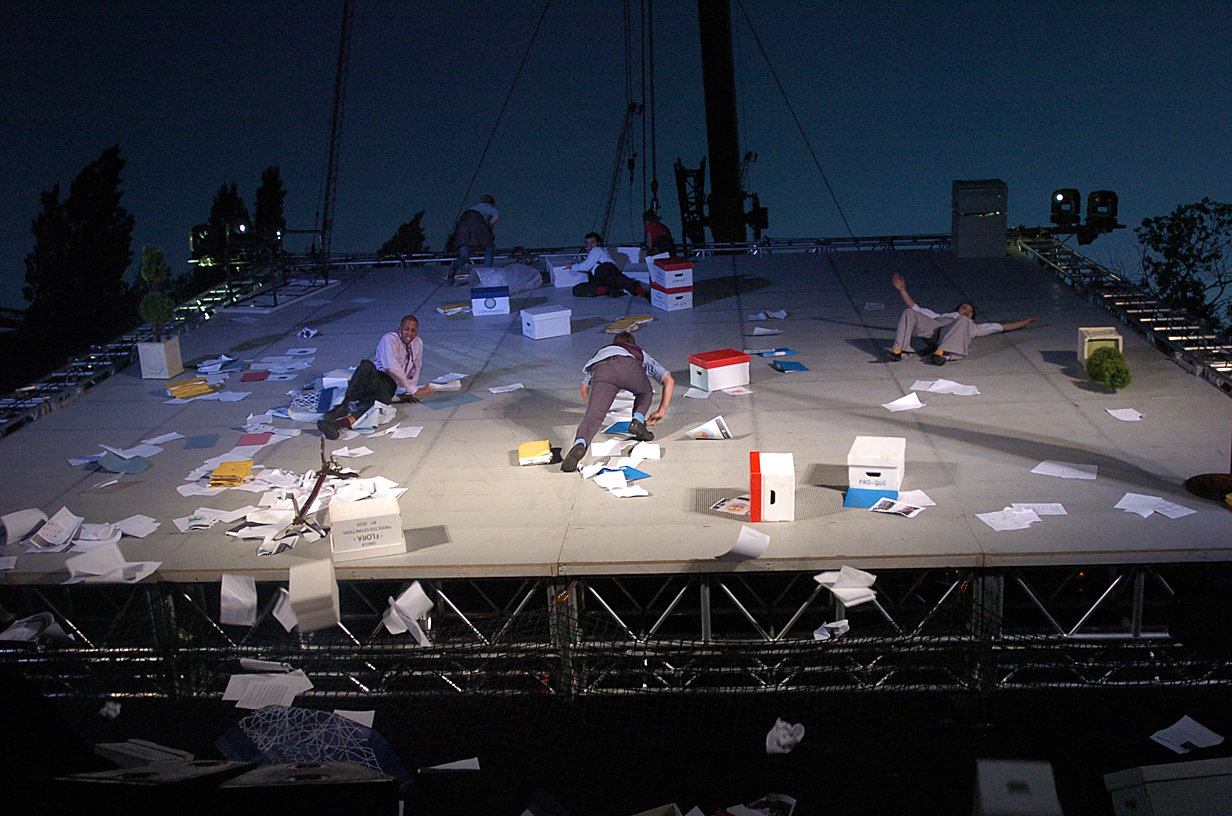
As The World Tipped

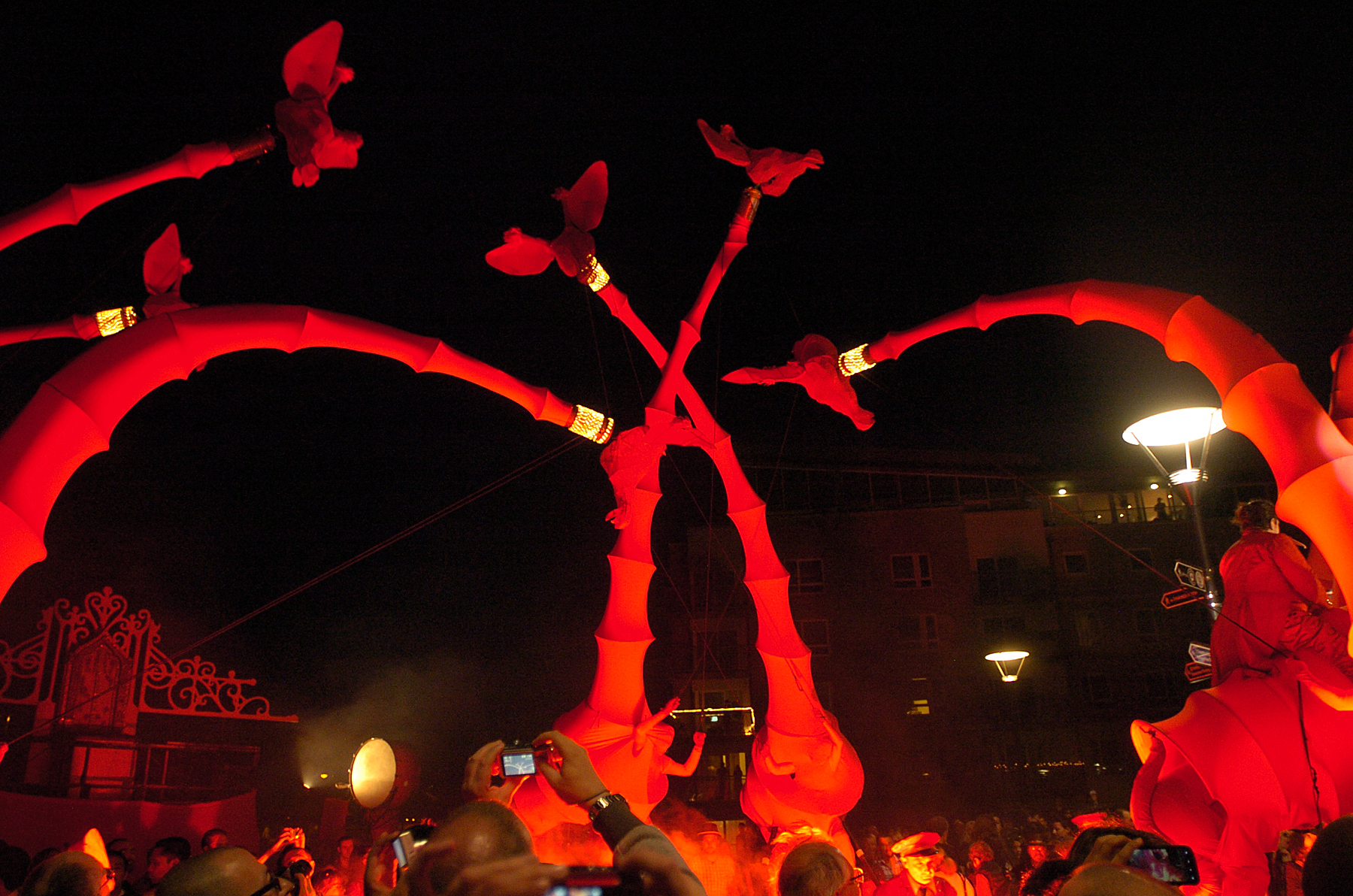
Les Girafes

== Reception ==
National press coverage in 2011 described GDIF as a key arts event in London’s cultural agenda with Lynn Gardner of The Guardian saying that the festival's "annual contribution to the happiness of the people of London is unrivalled".

The Telegraph called the event "reliably engaging and innovative", while Time Out described GDIF2012 as "one of London’s greatest free cultural events".

A Younger Theatre described GDIF as "street theatre at its best: epic, emotive and full of surprises."

== Funding ==
GDF is core funded by Arts Council England.
