= Bola Agbaje =

British-Nigerian playwright (born 1981)

Bola Agbaje FRSL
- Born: 1981 (age 43–44); St Thomas' Hospital, London, England
- Occupation: Playwright
- Notable works: Gone Too Far! Belong

Bola Agbaje FRSL (born 1981) is a British playwright of Nigerian descent.

== Biography ==
Agbaje was born at St Thomas' Hospital in the Waterloo area of London, England, to Nigerian parents, her father a civil servant and her mother a cook, and grew up in on the North Peckham Estate. She briefly lived in Nigeria between the ages of six and eight. After beginning her studies at Identity Drama School, Agbaje withdrew and instead joined the Royal Court Theatre's Young Writers Programme.

Formerly an actress, Agbaje's works explore the African condition both in England and abroad, mainly exploring the assimilation and social dynamics in African communities. Works such as Gone Too Far! and Belong examine these elements alongside the tensions and conflicts between racial and ethnic identities.

Agbaje's first play, Gone Too Far!, was produced at the Royal Court Theatre in London, where it won the 2008 Laurence Olivier Award for Outstanding Achievement in an Affiliate Theatre. It was later revived for very brief runs at the Albany Theatre and Hackney Empire.

Agjabe also wrote the plays The Burial and Belong.

In 2018, Agbaje was elected as a Fellow of the Royal Society of Literature (RSL), one of 40 under the age of 40 elected in an RSL initiative designed "to address historical biases".
