= Ambreen Razia =

English actress and writer

- Born: 1992 (age 33–34); London, England
- Education: University of West London; Identity School of Acting
- Occupation: Actress
- Years active: 2013–present

Ambreen Razia (born 1992) is an English actress and writer. She wrote and appeared in the sitcom Hounslow Diaries (2018). She has also appeared in the television series Murdered by My Father (2016), Trigonometry (2019), This Way Up (2019), Black Mirror (2019), Scrapper (2020), The Long Goodbye (2021), Starstruck (2022), The Curse (2022), and Ted Lasso (2023).

In 2023, Razia secured a development deal with Expectation Entertainment to write a comedy drama series, Wasted, about a South Asian immigrant mother and daughter.

== Background ==
Razia was born in 1992 in South London to a Pakistani single mother. She took her grandmother's given name, Razia, as her surname. She has an older sister. Razia graduated with a bachelor's degree from the University of West London in 2013 and training at the Identity School of Acting (IDSA). Prior to this, she attended Kingston College where she studied a BTEC in performing arts. She also attended Ricards Lodge School in South West London.

In 2015, Razia wrote and starred in the one-woman show The Diary of a Hounslow Girl at the Oval House Theatre in London. She took the show on a UK tour in 2016. That year, Razia was named best newcomer at the Asian Media Awards.
