= Brixton House =

Theatre in Brixton, London

Coordinates: 51.461975°N 0.11083961°W

- Interactive map of Brixton House
- Address: 385 Coldharbour Lane; London, SW9 8GL; United Kingdom
- Operator: Ovalhouse Theatre Limited
- Capacity: 180 and 120
- Type: Community producing theatre

Construction
- Opened: 2021; 5 years ago
- Architect: Edmund Wilson

Website
- brixtonhouse.co.uk

Brixton House is an Off-West End theatre in Brixton in the London Borough of Lambeth, located at 385 Coldharbour Lane, London, SW9 8GL. It is the successor to Ovalhouse at Kennington, and opened in 2022.

== Ovalhouse ==
The roots of Brixton House can be traced back to the 1930s and its foundations, as Christ Church (Oxford) Clubs, by the graduates of Christ Church, Oxford. Young people from disadvantaged areas in South London were able to access sports activities, skills training and supervised leisure activities through membership of the club. In the 1960s the club moved into theatre and it became known as the Oval House Theatre (later Ovalhouse), gaining a reputation as one of the most important centres for pioneer fringe theatre groups.

Ovalhouse closed in 2020, and moved to Brixton, initially named as Ovalhouse in Brixton but then Brixton House in time for opening in 2022. The move to Brixton was long in development: it was first announced in 2013, with an initial opening date of 2016.

== Brixton House ==
The inaugural artistic director of Brixton House is Gbolahan Obisesan. The theatre aims to be a cultural hub for social entertainment and artistic inspiration. There are two performance spaces, seating 180 and 120 audience members. The building was designed by Edmund Wilson of Foster Wilson Architects. It is adjacent to, and retains views of, Nuclear Dawn, one of the Brixton murals.

== Planned productions ==
Planned productions include:

- Mugabe, My Dad and Me, by Tonderai Munyevu
- Station, by Hussina Raja
