= Gone Too Far! =

Play by British-Nigerian playwright Bola Agbaje

- Written by: Bola Agbaje
- Original language: English
- Genre: Comedy

Premiere
- Place premiered: Jerwood Theatre Upstairs; Royal Court Theatre; London

Gone Too Far! is a play written by Bola Agbaje. It was produced at the Royal Court Theatre in February 2007, and won the Olivier Award for Outstanding Achievement in an Affiliate Theatre in 2008.
