= A.F.C. Richmond =

Fictional football club

- Full name: Association Football Club Richmond
- Nickname: The Greyhounds
- Founded: 1897 (fictional)
- Ground: The Dogtrack at Nelson Road (also known as Selhurst Park)
- Capacity: 25,000 (fictional)
- Owners: Rupert Mannion (former, fictional); Rebecca Welton (fictional)
- Manager: George Cartrick (former, fictional); Ted Lasso (former, fictional); Roy Kent (fictional)
- League: Premier League (fictional depiction)
- Website: afcrichmond.com
Home colours	Away colours	Third colours

Association Football Club Richmond is a fictional professional football club based in Richmond-upon-Thames, London, England. The club is featured in the Apple TV show Ted Lasso. They compete in the Premier League, the top tier of the English football league system.

The club dates back to the year 1897, and played their first match that same year. Since their founding, Richmond has played all of their home games at the fictitious Nelson Road Stadium, also known as "The Dogtrack". Formerly owned by the wealthy businessman Rupert Mannion, the club then came under the ownership of his ex-wife Rebecca Welton as part of their divorce settlement. As of the end of Season 3, Welton has sold 49% of the club, retaining a majority stake and full control of the club's operations. In season 4, Richmond launches a women's team.

== Club fictional history ==
A.F.C. Richmond in Ted Lasso is a historic English football club originally created in 1897 in Richmond, London and played its inaugural match in the same year. Throughout the First World War, their home ground was at the fictional Nelson Road Stadium.

The club has a traditional place in English football, regularly fluctuating between the Premier League and the Championship, competes against actual teams in the Premier League. In the fictional universe of the show, Richmond has gained a committed fan base deeply rooted in the local community.

Ted Lasso in a press conference after signing with A.F.C. Richmond

The modern history of A.F.C. Richmond began with the appointment of Ted Lasso as manager. Lasso, an American college football coach with no previous experience in English football, was appointed by owner Rebecca Welton as part of an attempt to undermine the club. His arrival alongside Coach Beard was met with scepticism from sections of the club and the media, with journalist Trent Crimm of The Independent initially predicting that he would fail. Lasso subsequently introduced an unconventional approach to coaching, placing emphasis on the development of players both on and off the pitch.

In Season 1, Richmond has a tough time on the pitch in the series, culminating in a heart-wrenching relegation from the Premier League following a dramatic last-day defeat. The relegation proves to be the changing moment. In their season in the Championship, the team finds their rhythm again, comes together as one under Lasso's guidance, and earns their way back into the top tier.

During the 2021–22 season, AFC Richmond's coaching staff underwent changes as Nathan Shelley, who had previously worked as the club's kit man before becoming an assistant coach, became dissatisfied with his position at the club. At the end of the season, Shelley left Richmond and joined West Ham United, which was owned by Rupert Mannion, the former husband of Richmond owner Rebecca Welton. His departure established West Ham as a rival to Richmond. AFC Richmond's relationship with West Ham United becomes more complicated after Shelley becomes West Ham's manager(fictional).

== Notable events ==
=== Match against Manchester City ===
A significant and emotionally charged match for A.F.C. Richmond in Ted Lasso takes place in Season 2, Episode 8 ("Man City"), during the FA Cup semi-final against Manchester City F.C. Held at Wembley Stadium, the game results in a heavy 5–0 loss for Richmond, emphasizing the disparity in skill and experience between the two teams.

Although the match ends in a decisive loss, the emotional aftermath prompts an exchange between assistant coach Beard and head coach Ted Lasso, while also triggering personal revelations for several players. Notably, Jamie Tartt confronts his abusive father in a tense locker room encounter, which becomes a catalyst for his personal growth and contributes to a renewed sense of unity within the team.

The match against Manchester City also reinforces the show's exploration of mental health, emotional vulnerability, and the importance of support within a team setting. Ted's struggle with panic attacks and Jamie's confrontation with his traumatic past are central to the episode, signaling a tonal shift from the show's earlier comedic focus to a more emotionally nuanced approach to character development.

Although fictional, the depiction of Manchester City reflects their real-life dominance in English football, reinforcing the authenticity of Ted Lasso's footballing world. The match further enhances the credibility of A.F.C. Richmond's underdog narrative as the team continues its journey toward redemption.

== Notable matches ==
Several matches in Ted Lasso serve as major narrative turning points for AFC Richmond throughout the series.

- AFC Richmond vs Crystal Palace (Season 1, Episode 2): Ted Lasso's first match as manager ends in a defeat, reinforcing early skepticism from fans and players regarding his appointment.
- AFC Richmond vs Everton (Season 1, Episode 7): Richmond secures an unexpected victory, with the signing of Dani Rojas providing a significant lift to the team's morale.
- AFC Richmond vs Manchester City (Season 1, Episode 10): Richmond loses in a decisive end-of-season match, resulting in the club being relegated to the Championship. Jamie Tartt delivers the assist that seals Richmond's fate.
- AFC Richmond vs Tottenham Hotspur – FA Cup match (Season 2, Episode 6): Richmond wins through a dramatic counterattack fueled by Nathan Shelley's tactic of "parking the bus", meanwhile Ted has a panic attack and leaves the field.
- AFC Richmond vs Manchester City – FA Cup Semi-final (Season 2, Episode 8): Richmond suffers a heavy defeat, but the match is notable for Jamie Tartt's confrontation with his father, followed by Roy Kent offering him support.
- AFC Richmond vs Brentford (Season 2, Episode 12): Richmond earns promotion back to the Premier League following a dramatic penalty taken by Dani Rojas, who hadn't taken a penalty since after accidentally killing the team mascot, Earl, paying homage to him in his celebrations.
- AFC Richmond vs West Ham United (Season 3, Episode 4): Richmond's first match against West Ham, with the latter now under the management of Nate Shelley. The match marks the start of a bitter rivalry between the clubs, with Richmond playing aggressively in the second half and losing heavily.
- AFC Richmond vs Manchester City (Season 3, Episode 11): Richmond defeats Manchester City in a pivotal late-season fixture. The match is significant for Jamie Tartt's return to his hometown, his continued personal growth, and the club's resurgence.
- AFC Richmond vs West Ham United (Season 3, Episode 12): Richmond's rematch against West Ham, after Nate reconciles with Lasso and rejoins Richmond. Despite trailing two goals to none after the first half, Richmond rallies and defeats West Ham, finishing second in the Premier League and securing a place in the Champions League. This is Richmond's final match under Ted Lasso's management, and symbolizes the club's development during Lasso's tenure.

== Stadium ==
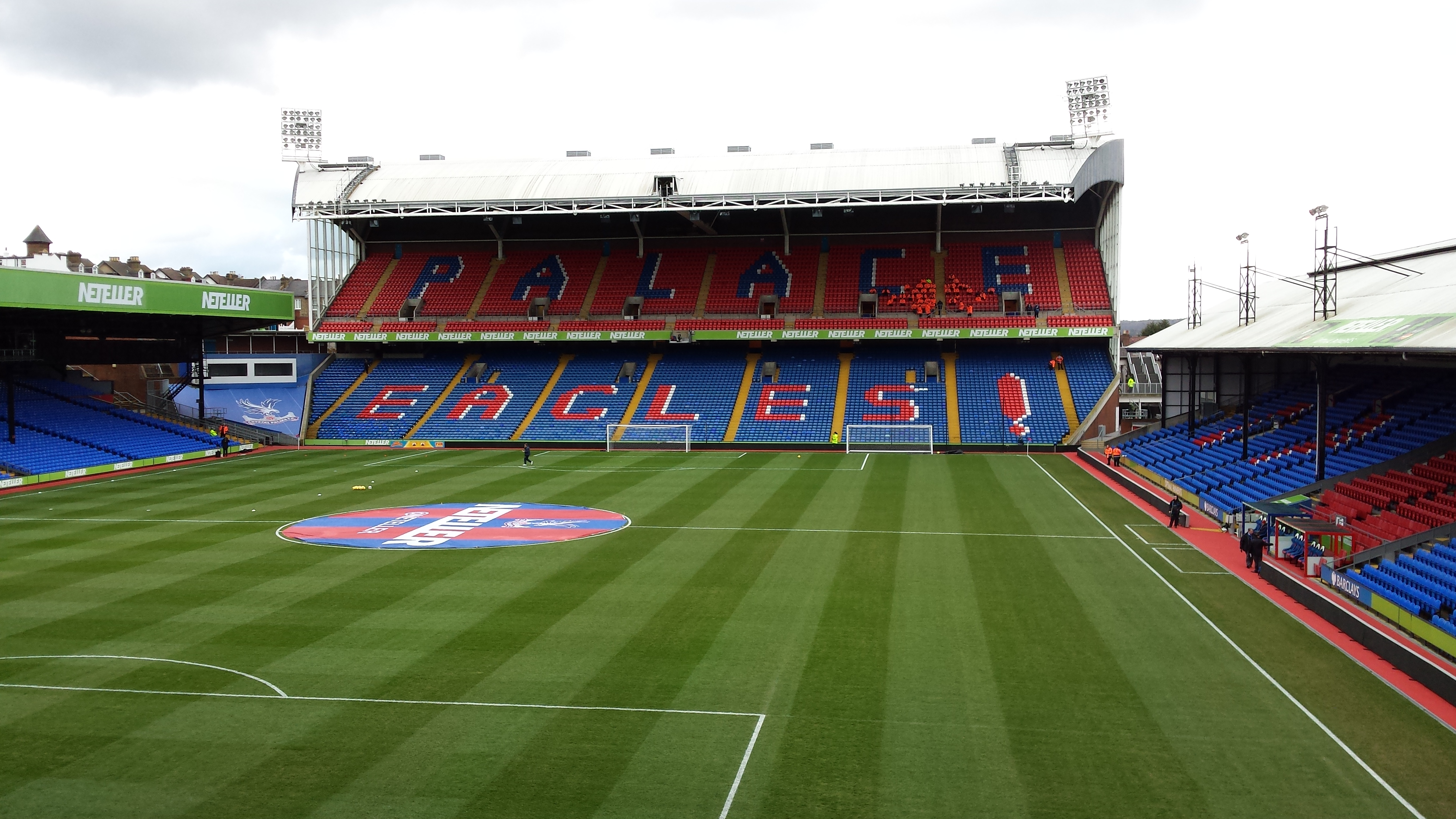
Crystal Palace's stadium Selhurst Park was used as AFC Richmond's Nelson Road.

A.F.C. Richmond plays its home matches at Nelson Road Stadium, a fictional football ground located in the London Borough of Richmond upon Thames. Within the Ted Lasso universe, Nelson Road serves as the club's historic home and a central setting for many key moments in the series. The stadium is portrayed as a traditional English football ground with a passionate fan base, often seen filled with supporters donning the team's signature claret and blue colors.

While Nelson Road itself is fictional, the scenes set at the stadium are filmed at Selhurst Park, the real-life home of Crystal Palace F.C. in the London Borough of Croydon. The production team digitally modifies the stadium to match the show's aesthetic and to represent Richmond's home venue.

Nelson Road is depicted as a classic English ground with close-up seating, raucous fan support, and a strong sense of community. The stadium becomes a symbol of Richmond's identity, hosting everything from decisive matches to emotional character arcs, including Ted's speeches, Jamie Tartt’s return, and Roy Kent’s final games as a player.

== Kit and sponsorship ==
Home kit used in first and second seasons of Ted Lasso.

In season 1 of Ted Lasso, AFC Richmond's kit is manufactured by fictitious brand Verani Sports, and their shirt sponsor is the fictitious airline Dubai Air.

During season 2, Richmond winger Sam Obisanya learns that Dubai Air's parent company (the fictitious Cerethium Oil) has been polluting his home country of Nigeria, and bribing the government to turn a blind eye, shortly after accepting a marketing campaign with Dubai Air. While preparing for their Championship match against Coventry City, Obisanya covers the Dubai Air logo on his chest in protest, and the rest of the team follows suit. Some time later, Richmond drops Dubai Air as its sponsor in favor of the fictional dating app Bantr, which their PR consultant is promoting.

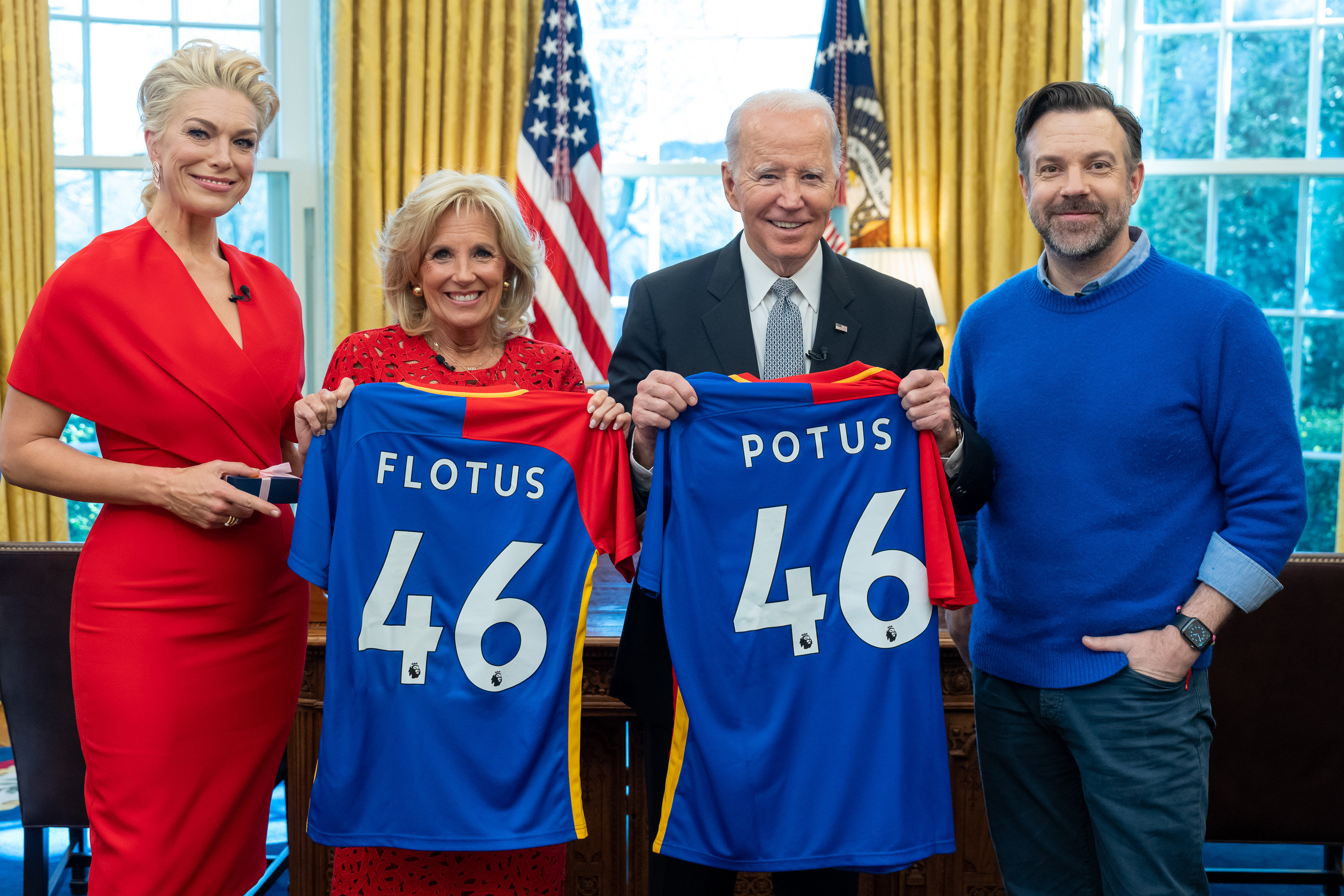
Joe Biden and Jill Biden with Jason Sudeikis (Ted Lasso) and Hannah Waddingham (Rebecca Welton) presenting them with AFC Richmond shirts on March 20, 2023

In season 3, AFC Richmond keeps Bantr as their shirt sponsor, and has entered a kit deal with major sportswear company Nike, following their return to the Premier League. The fictional deal represents the club's increased prominence in the series' narrative, and the growth of its presence among the show's fanbase.

Nike also released official A.F.C. Richmond merchandise, including replica home and away kits, which became available for purchase through select retailers and Apple's online store. This real-world tie-in has contributed to the show's immersive fan experience, blurring the line between fiction and reality for supporters of the series.

== Key characters ==
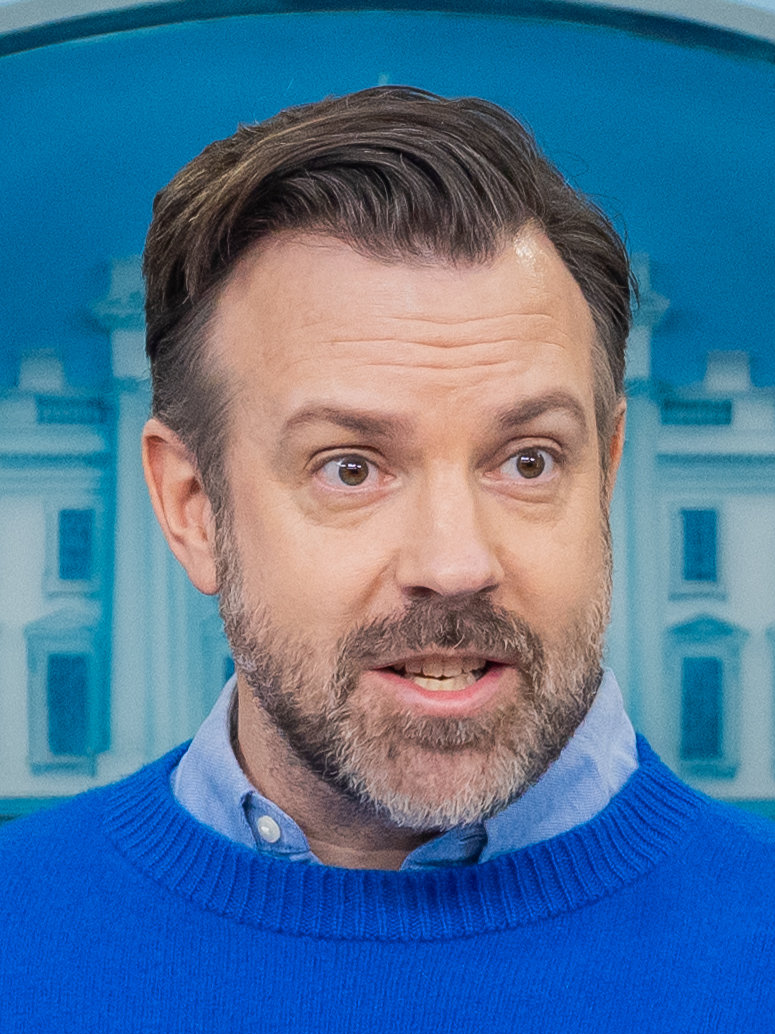
Ted Lasso, Head coach from American college football

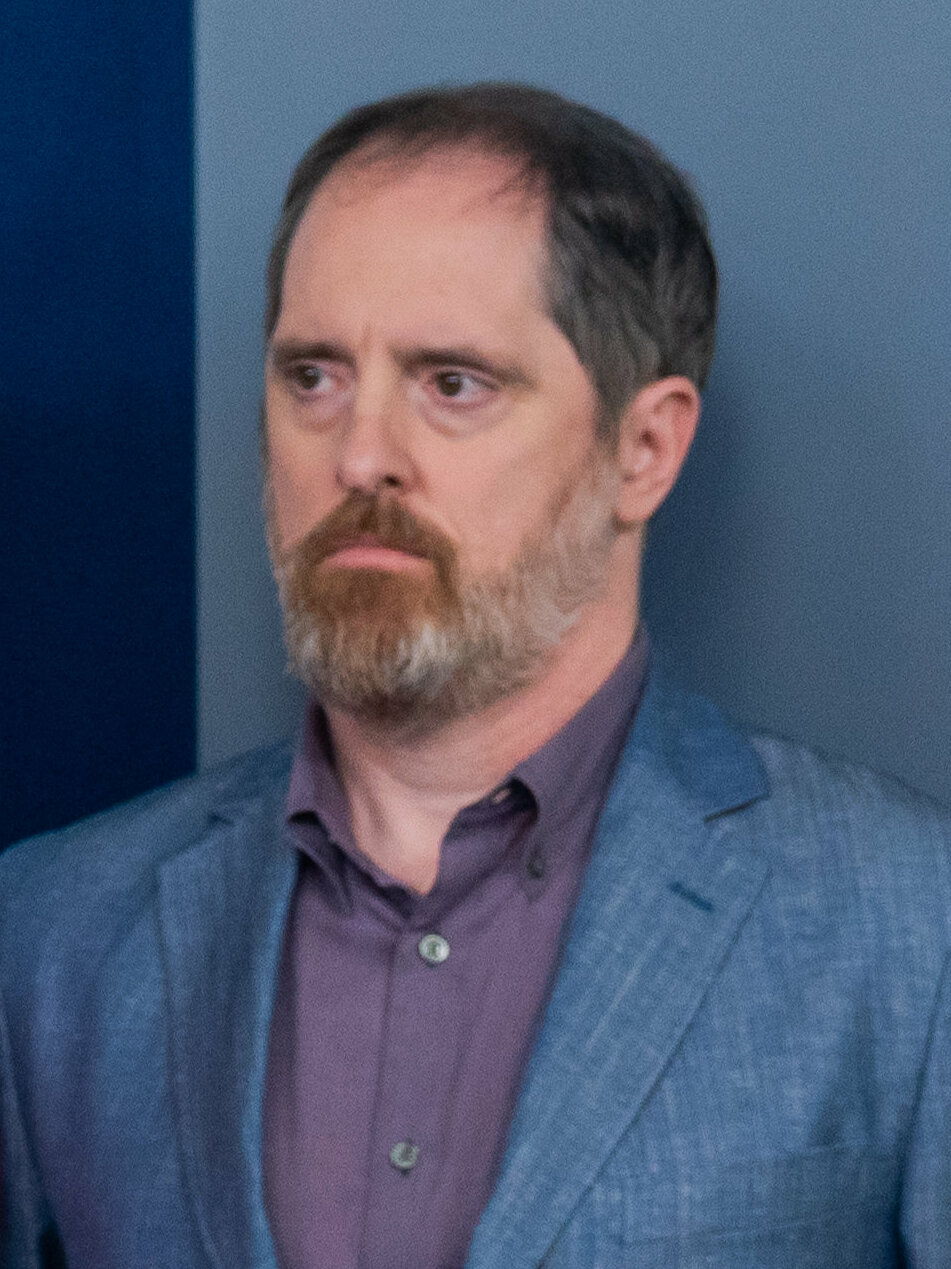
Willis Beard, assistant coach; joined Ted Lasso as assistant coach at the club

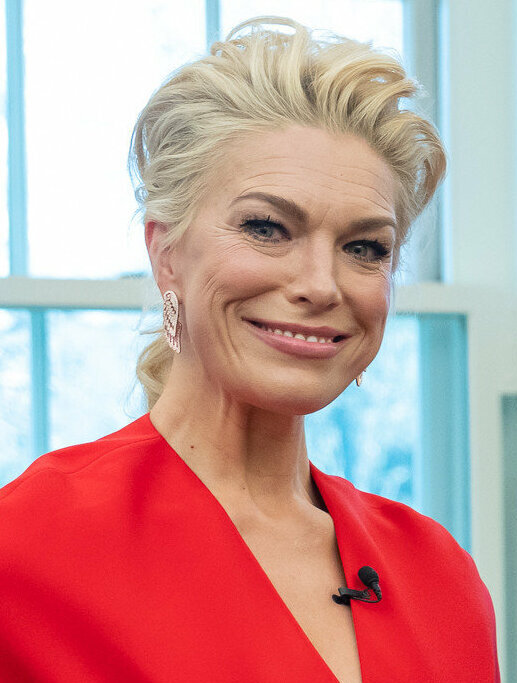
Rebecca Welton, Owner of A.F.C. Richmond

=== Club officials ===
Name	Note
Ted Lasso	The club's head coach for three seasons. Originally an American football coach at the college level, Ted is hired as the club's new owner believes his lack of knowledge of association football will lead the club to ruin, in a plan to get revenge on her unfaithful ex-husband. However, Ted proves to be a worthy, capable coach, and earns the respect of his players and colleagues through his positivity and humble approach to coaching. Though his first season is poor, resulting in Richmond getting relegated, Ted's efforts result in the club getting promoted again, eventually finishing as runners-up in the Premier League. Ted eventually resigns to return to the United States to be closer to his son.
Willis Beard	One of the club's assistant coaches, and Ted's long-time best friend. Beard was originally Ted's assistant coach for American football at the college level, and moved to the United Kingdom with Ted to support him. Beard is currently an assistant coach, supporting Roy Kent.
Rebecca Welton	Richmond's current owner, who gained ownership of the club as part of her divorce settlement from Rupert Mannion (the club's previous owner). Though she initially wished to ruin the club as a way to get revenge on her ex-husband, she eventually reconsiders, and works with Ted to improve the club's standings in the Championship, and later, the Premier League. Rebecca eventually sells part of the club to the fans, retaining a majority stake and full control over the club's operations.
Roy Kent	The club's former captain, and current head coach. A veteran with stints at Sunderland and Chelsea, Roy is a box-to-box midfielder with a gruff personality and commanding presence. After retiring from professional football following a career-ending tackle, Roy has a brief stint as a football pundit before returning to Richmond as an assistant coach. After Ted leaves the club and returns to the United States, Roy steps in as the new manager and head coach.
Nathan Shelley	The club's kit man, with a gift for football tactics and management. Nate is promoted to assistant coach at the start of Richmond's season in the EFL Championship, and leaves at the end of the season after a falling-out with Ted. Nate begins the next season as the head coach of West Ham United F.C.. After regretting his actions, he quits West Ham and returns to his old position at AFC Richmond, reconciling with the other staff.
Leslie Higgins	Richmond's Director of Football Operations, and Rebecca's assistant. Leslie is responsible for most of the administrative work at AFC Richmond, such as drafting contracts for new players and promoting the club's activities.
Keeley Jones	A former model, and Richmond's public relations consultant. Keeley's job is to promote Richmond as a brand and establish corporate relationships to fund the club's activities and equipment. Keeley later leaves Richmond to set up her own PR firm, with the club becoming one of their top clients.
Alice Chilton	The hard-to-crack assistant coach of AFC Richmond's women's team. A former professional midfielder, Alice's career on the pitch came to an end after multiple ACL injuries in rapid succession. On Ted's recommendation, Alice eventually gets promoted to the manager of the women's team.

=== Notable supporting members ===
Name	Note
Trent Crimm	Former journalist with The Independent who joins AFC Richmond in Season 3 to write a book about the club.
Dr. Sharon Fieldstone	Sports psychologist hired during Season 2 to improve the players’ mental health; Head of Mental Health and Emotional Being.

=== Former club officials ===
Name	Note
Rupert Mannion	Former owner of AFC Richmond; later purchased West Ham United F.C.
George Cartrick	Former AFC Richmond manager; later became a football pundit and replaced Nathan Shelley as head coach of West Ham United F.C.

== Fictional players ==
As depicted in the television series Ted Lasso, the following fictional players are part of A.F.C. Richmond's roster:

=== Men's team ===
Note: Flags indicate national team as defined under FIFA eligibility rules; some limited exceptions apply. Players may hold more than one non-FIFA nationality.

No.	Pos.	Nation	Player
1	GK	ENG	Tom O'Brien
2	DF	ENG	Arlo Dixon
3	DF	ENG	Gareth Canterbury
4	DF	NGR	Emmanuel Winchester
5	DF	ENG	Isaac McAdoo (Captain)
6	MF	ENG	Roy Kent (Retired, Former Captain)
7	MF	ENG	Ozzie Kukoč
8	MF	FRA	Richard Montlaur
9	FW	ENG	Jamie Tartt
10	FW	POL	Zava
12	MF	WAL	Colin Hughes
13	DF	NED	Jan Maas
14	FW	MEX	Dani Rojas
15	MF	ENG	Jack "Diesel" Dawkins
16	FW	ZIM	Robbie Roberts
17	DF	ENG	George Goodman
18	DF	NGR	Ugo Babatunde
23	-	N/A	Bockronde (1 season)
19	FW	ENG	Declan Cockburn
20	DF	IRL	Paul Reynolds
21	MF	SUI	Moe Bumbercatch
22	GK	NED	Martin De Maat
23	-	N/A	Giovanni Sagredo (1 season)
23	-	N/A	Snape (1 season)
24	FW	NGR	Sam Obisanya
25	-	N/A	Gerald Alexander (1 season)
25	GK	N/A	Alexander Bekoe (1 season)
26	-	N/A	Garvey
27	MF	BOL	Tyler Shannon
28	FW	ENG	Kyle McCracken (duplicate number)
28	-	N/A	Ray Bhargava (duplicate number)
31	-	N/A	Christian Garron
33	-	N/A	Anders Rosenfeldt
47	-	N/A	Robbie
81	GK	CAN	Thierry "Van Damme" Zoreaux

=== Women's team ===
Note: Flags indicate national team as defined under FIFA eligibility rules; some limited exceptions apply. Players may hold more than one non-FIFA nationality.

No.	Pos.	Nation	Player
1	GK	ENG	Katie "Boots" Quinn
3	DF	ENG	Lizzie Davis (Captain)
4	DF	IRL	Siobhan Harrigan
5	DF	IRL	Niamh Harrigan
6	MF	N/A	Mady Song
6	MF	N/A	Margy El Sherif
21	FW	ENG	Shannon Stone
47	FW	ENG	Gemma Jay

== Cultural impact ==
A.F.C. Richmond developed a real-world following through Ted Lasso. Merchandise, including kits and scarves, have been released under official license. In 2023, A.F.C. Richmond was included as a playable team in FIFA 23, video game by EA Sports, marking one of the few times a fictional club was featured in the franchise.
