= Ted Lasso (character) =

Protagonist of the Ted Lasso television series

- Ted Lasso character
- Jason Sudeikis as Ted Lasso
- First appearance: "Pilot"; August 14, 2020
- Portrayed by: Jason Sudeikis

In-universe information
- Full name: Theodore Lasso
- Occupation: Soccer coach
- Spouse: Michelle Lasso (formerly)
- Children: Henry
- Origin: Kansas City Metropolitan Area
- Nationality: American

Theodore "Ted" Lasso is the title character and protagonist of the American sports comedy-drama television series Ted Lasso, portrayed by Jason Sudeikis. The character originated in promotional material produced for NBC Sports in 2012, in which an American football coach is hired to manage an English football club. The television version of the character was substantially reworked from this premise: where the original was written as ignorant and arrogant, the series version was reconceived as curious and emotionally open. In the series, Ted serves as head coach of AFC Richmond, a fictional English Premier League club, across three seasons, before resigning and returning to the United States to be present in his son's life.

Critical reception of the character was broadly favorable through the first two seasons and became more divided in the third. Reviewers praised Sudeikis's performance across all three seasons, and most found the character's optimism plausible rather than cloying, particularly as the second season introduced his history of trauma and his engagement with therapy. Some critics identified weaknesses in the character's construction from the outset, including underdeveloped motivation and a peripheral treatment of the women in his life. By the third season, a portion of critics argued that the series had regressed toward an uncritical endorsement of Ted's perspective, rendering his persistent ignorance of soccer implausible and his influence didactic. For his portrayal of Ted Lasso, Sudeikis won and was nominated for many awards, including two Primetime Emmy Awards, two Golden Globes, and two Critics' Choice Awards. He reprised the role in FIFA 23 and at the 2026 FIFA World Cup final halftime show.

Scholars have analyzed the character through frameworks drawn from leadership theory, psychology, and cultural criticism. Researchers argued that Ted's behavior illustrates principles of authentic and servant leadership, and that his relational style reflects an attachment pattern shaped by his father's death by suicide, with humor functioning as a defense against unprocessed grief. Cultural critics offered more skeptical readings, contending that Ted's optimism operates at the level of interpersonal attitude rather than institutional critique and that his utopian framing excludes racial and systemic realities in ways accessible primarily to those insulated from them. One critic identified the character as a deliberate formal inversion of the antihero tradition in prestige television.

== Role ==
In the first season, Ted Lasso moves from Kansas to London to serve as the head coach of AFC Richmond, an English Premier League football club, despite having no experience coaching association football. He accepts the position under the employment of club owner Rebecca Welton and brings his assistant, Coach Beard, to help manage the team. Throughout the season, Lasso remains positive despite hostility from the local fans, the press, and his own players, including veteran Roy Kent and the arrogant Jamie Tartt. After she visits London, Ted's wife Michelle informs him that her feelings for him had waned and files for divorce, which he finalizes. Ted promotes the former kit man Nate Shelley to assistant coach. By the end of the season, Ted discovers that Rebecca originally hired him to ensure the club's failure as a means of seeking revenge against her ex-husband, Rupert Mannion, but he accepts her apology and remains with the team following their relegation to the Championship.

During the second season, Ted manages the club in the Championship, which sustains a streak of consecutive draws that affects team confidence. After Dani Rojas accidentally kills the team mascot on the pitch during a penalty kick, Ted supports the hiring of sports psychologist Dr. Sharon Fieldstone, though he initially expresses skepticism toward her profession. Ted experiences several panic attacks, including one during a high-stakes match against Tottenham Hotspur, which leads him to leave the pitch before the game concludes. He eventually enters therapy with Dr. Fieldstone and discloses that his father died by suicide during Ted's adolescence. Ted and Nate's relationship deteriorates as Nate feels ignored by Ted's management style, leading to Nate leaking the news of Ted's panic attack to the press and subsequently leaving the club to coach West Ham United, while Ted leads Richmond to earn promotion back to the Premier League.

In the third season, Ted continues to coach AFC Richmond while managing his feelings regarding his ex-wife's new romantic relationship with their former marriage counselor. Richmond briefly signs the mercurial superstar Zava, but after his sudden retirement, Ted implements a new tactical system called "Richmond Way" (his version of Total Football). Ted eventually reconciles with Nate, who resigns from West Ham after realizing Rupert's toxicity and returns to Richmond as an assistant. Throughout the season, Ted expresses an increasing desire to spend more time with his son, Henry, who lives in the United States. During the final league match against West Ham, Ted coaches the team to a second-place finish in the Premier League behind Manchester City. Following the conclusion of the season, Ted resigns from his position at AFC Richmond and returns to Kansas to resume a role in his son's daily life, where he coaches Henry's youth soccer team.

== Development and writing ==
The character of Ted Lasso originated in an Amsterdam dressing room around 2001, during Jason Sudeikis and Brendan Hunt's time as members of the improvisational comedy group Boom Chicago. Hunt had arrived in the Netherlands as a Chicago Bears fan who disliked soccer, but he became interested in the sport through exposure to its culture in the city. Sudeikis purchased a PlayStation so the two could play the soccer video game FIFA around their performance schedule, and those sessions prompted them to speculate about what it would look like if an American NFL coach were placed in charge of a major European club, a scenario with no real-world precedent at the time. In 2012, NBC Sports acquired the broadcast rights to the Premier League, but they were not sure that American audiences knew enough about English soccer to justify the investment. The network commissioned a short promotional film built around a fictional American football coach mistakenly hired to manage Tottenham Hotspur, and they cast Sudeikis in the role. NBC brought the character back for a second promotional spot the following year but subsequently retired him.

The version of Ted Lasso who appeared in the NBC Sports promotional videos was, by Sudeikis's own description, broader and less sympathetic than the television character. Sudeikis called the original Ted "belligerent", and separately characterized the type of person that version represented as someone combining ignorance with arrogance, a pairing he described as "the worst combination of a human man". He said that screen comedy at the time was "inundated" with that kind of character—"people that you're like, 'How does this person still have this job?'". Around 2015, Sudeikis began reconsidering the character, and he identified the cultural climate of that period as a direct reason for the change in direction, citing the tenor of online discourse, the political emergence of Donald Trump, and his experience as a new parent as factors that made him reluctant to add to what he described as a binary and non-listening culture. Sudeikis said he knew, from 2015, that the character was "real", "complicated", "not perfect", going through difficulties, and "actually nice".

The central authorial decision in moving from the NBC version to the Apple TV+ version concerned Ted's relationship to his own ignorance. Hunt explained that Sudeikis identified curiosity as the quality that defined the character; it is the difference between being simply unknowing and being someone who recognizes their own limits and wants to learn. Hunt added that this disposition "automatically lends itself to being a big-hearted, welcoming person who wants to know about every single person you meet". The character they built was ignorant but curious, and Sudeikis attributed that quality directly to his own father, saying it was also probably how he himself behaves toward his children and calling it "the unlocking of the character". Hunt confirmed that while the premise from the original promotional material of a coach in an unfamiliar place tasked with learning how to navigate it remained in the series, he and Sudeikis regarded the NBC spots as "the footprints that [they were] walking in" rather than a template, and that the character had to be made into "a fuller, different version". By the time the series went into production, soccer had grown considerably in the United States, with two Women's World Cup victories and the expansion of Major League Soccer. Sudeikis argued that a character written as a college football coach would by then have picked up some knowledge of the sport from sports media, so the new version of Ted had to reflect that.

The writing room also worked to define what kind of cultural moment the character was meant to address. Bill Lawrence described the writers as regularly discussing what he called a prevailing "attitude of pessimism" in the culture, using as an example the assumption that anyone who said they wanted to go into politics was probably looking to exploit the system rather than genuinely wanting to help people. Sudeikis found the act of writing and performing the character sustaining, saying: "The feeling at the end of the day of writing or pretending to be this guy, it's nice. He's egoless". He characterized Ted's narrative function as someone who leads people toward a better place rather than saving them outright, and summarized the character's overall target as a mix between Fred Rogers and John Wooden. He described the character to The Observer in 2023 as functioning like "the American Mary Poppins", someone who shows up, does what needs doing, and tries to leave things better than he found them.

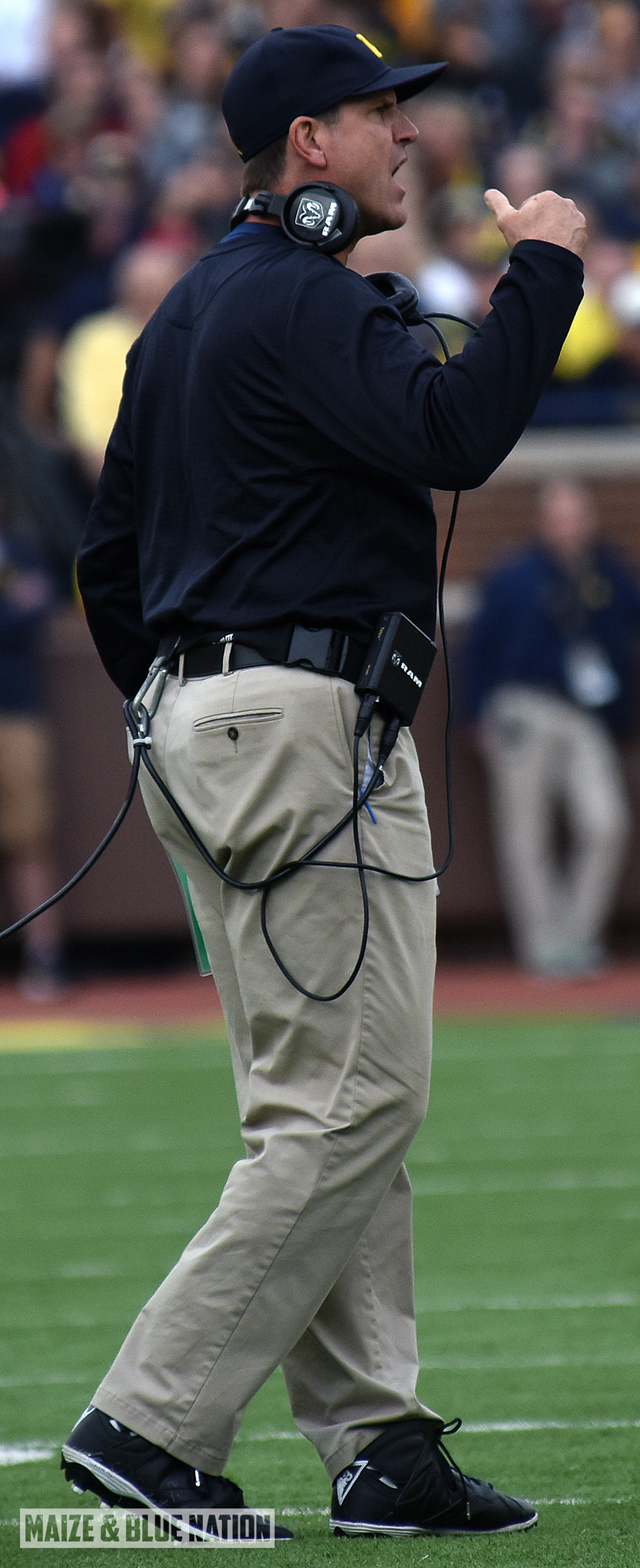
Jim Harbaugh's game-day attire influenced Ted Lasso's attire.

Sudeikis drew on specific real people when building the character's voice, values, and verbal habits, most of them coaches he had encountered or admired during his years playing high school basketball in Kansas. He named a set of coaches—John Wooden, Roy Williams, Bill Self, Pete Carroll, Steve Kerr, and Jürgen Klopp—as influences, describing them as coaches who care more about the person than the result. He also named his own high school basketball coach, Donnie Campbell of Shawnee Mission West High School in Kansas City, crediting him with having introduced him to Wooden's "Pyramid of Success" by posting a daily quotation from it before practice and requiring players to memorize it. In the series, Ted hangs a copy of the Pyramid of Success in his office. From Campbell, Sudeikis also took a set of folksy sayings, including "You guys look more nervous than a long-tailed cat in a room full of rocking chairs", and implemented them into Ted's speech. The character's game-day wardrobe was developed through a direct exchange between Sudeikis and football coach Jim Harbaugh. On September 4, 2019, while filming was underway on the second episode of the series, Sudeikis texted Harbaugh to ask how he dressed on game days and for post-game interviews. Harbaugh replied with a detailed account: the same khakis and blue sweatshirt every day, no change of clothes after games, and a duplicate set kept in his locker by the equipment manager for inclement conditions, closing with the line "I pack a toothbrush and a great attitude".

== Analysis ==
Megan Garber of The Atlantic argued that the defining quality of Ted Lasso as a character is not his optimism but his curiosity, setting him apart from comparable "fish-across-the-pond" protagonists, like Emily Cooper from Emily in Paris. Where other such characters treat their ignorance as existential—something to be accommodated or forgiven—Garber contended that Ted's ignorance is conditional, a starting condition he works to overcome rather than a fixed identity. She further argued that the character is constructed with an explicit awareness of the negative valences of American identity. When a Nigerian player declines a gift of toy soldiers, Ted's simple acknowledgment of the word "imperialism" signals that he understands his national identity as a liability to be overcome rather than a virtue to be exported. Garber characterized Ted's refusal to prioritize winning as functioning at the edges of the comedy as an elegy for a receding version of American exceptionalism, and argued that while Ted may function as an avatar of American entitlement, he frames that entitlement as something to be overcome rather than accommodated. Judy Berman of Time suggested that Ted's selflessness constitutes a deliberate formal inversion of the antihero tradition that dominated prestige television from the late 1990s onward, in which masculine authority was expressed through violence, deception, or emotional suppression. Berman identified these traits as ones more culturally associated with women, and argued that the character is engineered to demonstrate them as compatible with the traditionally masculine context of professional sport.

Alexander Hudson Beare and Robert Boucaut, writing in Critical Studies in Television, argued that the character's "philosophy of kindness" is structurally one-dimensional and serves corporate rather than socially critical ends. They contended that Ted's optimism operates at the level of individual acts and interpersonal relationships rather than challenging the institutional and systemic conditions of professional football, and that this vagueness is consonant with Apple's corporate identity, in which the appearance of progressive values is deployed in support of existing commercial structures. Beare and Boucaut argued that the story world Ted inhabits constitutes a "capitalist utopia" in which systemic problems are rendered as the failures of individual bad actors who simply need to "believe", and that Ted himself embodies this worldview by achieving cultural transformation through attitudinal change rather than institutional critique. Shannon Sweeney, writing in Television & New Media, contended that Ted's optimism and the show's near-absence of racial and COVID-19 pandemic–related content made the character a vehicle for a specific form of white middle-class engagement with political crisis. Sweeney argued that Ted's "be curious, not judgmental" formulation presents individual attitude change as a plausible substitute for organized political action, and that this substitution is itself an expression of social privilege available only to those not directly threatened by the conditions the character's world excludes. She further said that Ted's construction as a utopian figure made the first season "a post-racial and post-feminist text" whose escapist qualities were accessible primarily to those with the social and economic security to use television as a retreat from the conditions it omits.

Beare and Boucaut directed a specific dimension of their ideological argument at the character's relationship to homophobia in professional sport. They documented the pervasiveness of institutional homophobia in real-world soccer and argued that the show's decision to exclude gay characters and storylines from its first two seasons is not an oversight but a structural feature of the utopic logic Ted enacts: a world in which inclusivity is asserted through Ted's coaching ethos without the conditions that would make such inclusivity necessary or meaningful. They said that the show's eventual introduction of LGBTQ+ storylines in the third season does not revise this logic but confirms it, in that Colin, a player, staying closeted is framed as an unfounded personal fear rather than a response to real institutional homophobia. On the question of masculinity more broadly, Beare and Boucaut contended that while Ted's character recontextualizes several traits associated with hypermasculinity—the player Roy Kent's anger is redirected toward team unity, and the player Jamie Tartt's aggression is reframed as a tactical tool—these recontextualizations do not constitute a genuine dismantling of toxic masculinity but rather a repositioning of it in service of a positive affective outcome. Berman identified a related structural problem at the level of character construction, arguing that Ted's perfection is "weirdly brittle": his personality is so precisely calibrated to balance masculine credibility with emotional sensitivity that it cannot sustain contact with realistic psychological pressure. She suggested that the cultural inability to imagine a decent but unexceptional man may itself be symptomatic of the crisis of masculine representation the character is designed to address.

Brian Driscoll, writing in the New England College Journal of Applied Educational Research, asserted that Ted's relational orientation—his capacity to meet people where they are emotionally—is a formation shaped by his own trauma history, including his father's suicide. He identified Ted's attachment style as consistent with what John Bowlby theorized as a preoccupied adult attachment pattern, arising from inconsistent caregiving in childhood and expressed through a tendency to seek approval and prioritize others' needs over his. Driscoll further argued that Ted's use of humor functions within his psychology as a defense mechanism against unprocessed grief, a dynamic the series makes explicit in his sessions with the team's psychologist, where he deploys comedy to deflect acknowledgment of his own pain. Christopher P. Neck and Christopher B. Neck, writing in Administrative Sciences, analyzed the same psychological material through a leadership framework rather than a clinical one, saying that Ted's consistency of values in the face of external criticism constitutes, in their account, an expression of authentic leadership's requirement that a leader remain grounded in internalized moral principles regardless of external pressure.

Christopher P. Neck and Christopher B. Neck argued that Ted's character illustrates a specific theoretical relationship between two moral leadership frameworks: authentic leadership and servant leadership. They contended that in Ted's case, authentic leadership functions as a mechanism through which servant leadership is enacted, because Ted's core identity is defined by a desire to serve others. They specified that this alignment is not a universal feature of authentic leadership: other authentically led individuals may express their values through transformational or directive styles. What makes Ted analytically distinctive, in their account, is that his authentic self and his servant orientation are inseparable, such that behaving in accordance with his own values necessarily produces follower-centered leadership. Driscoll argued that these same behaviors correspond to the counseling competencies that trauma-informed educational research identifies as effective for building trust with students who have experienced adverse childhood experiences. He proposed that Ted's behavioral model, while scripted, illustrates principles of relational trust-building that educators can apply in classroom settings, treating the character as a portable demonstration of Carl Rogers's person-centered therapeutic conditions translated into a non-clinical relational context.

== Reception ==
=== Critical reception ===
Jason Sudeikis's performance as Ted Lasso drew broad critical attention. Ben Travers of IndieWire argued that few actors could have made the character's "unflappable optimism" feel as charming and believable as Sudeikis did, writing that Sudeikis "knows just how to shrug off an attack without dismissing its intentions, plow ahead with encouragement without overwhelming his target", and that when the mustachioed grin is not appropriate, "he can keep the aura of a smile hidden behind his straight face". Nick Harley of Den of Geek described Sudeikis as delivering an "intensely likable lead performance", and argued that the role constituted the ideal deployment of his comedic persona, much as Palm Springs had done for Andy Samberg. Johanna Schneller of The Globe and Mail called Sudeikis's casting "the role of his life". Liz Shannon Miller of Collider argued that much of the character's appeal derives from Sudeikis's "innate charisma", while Ed Cumming of The Independent wrote that the more rounded version of the character, as developed for the series, constituted "a better use of Sudeikis's talents". Mike Hale of The New York Times, more reserved in his appraisal, wrote that Sudeikis possesses "a preternatural ability to commit to the slightest wisp of a character" and is "believable and even likable as Lasso", though he characterized the character himself as one who "makes no sense except as an avatar of a mythical Midwestern good-heartedness".

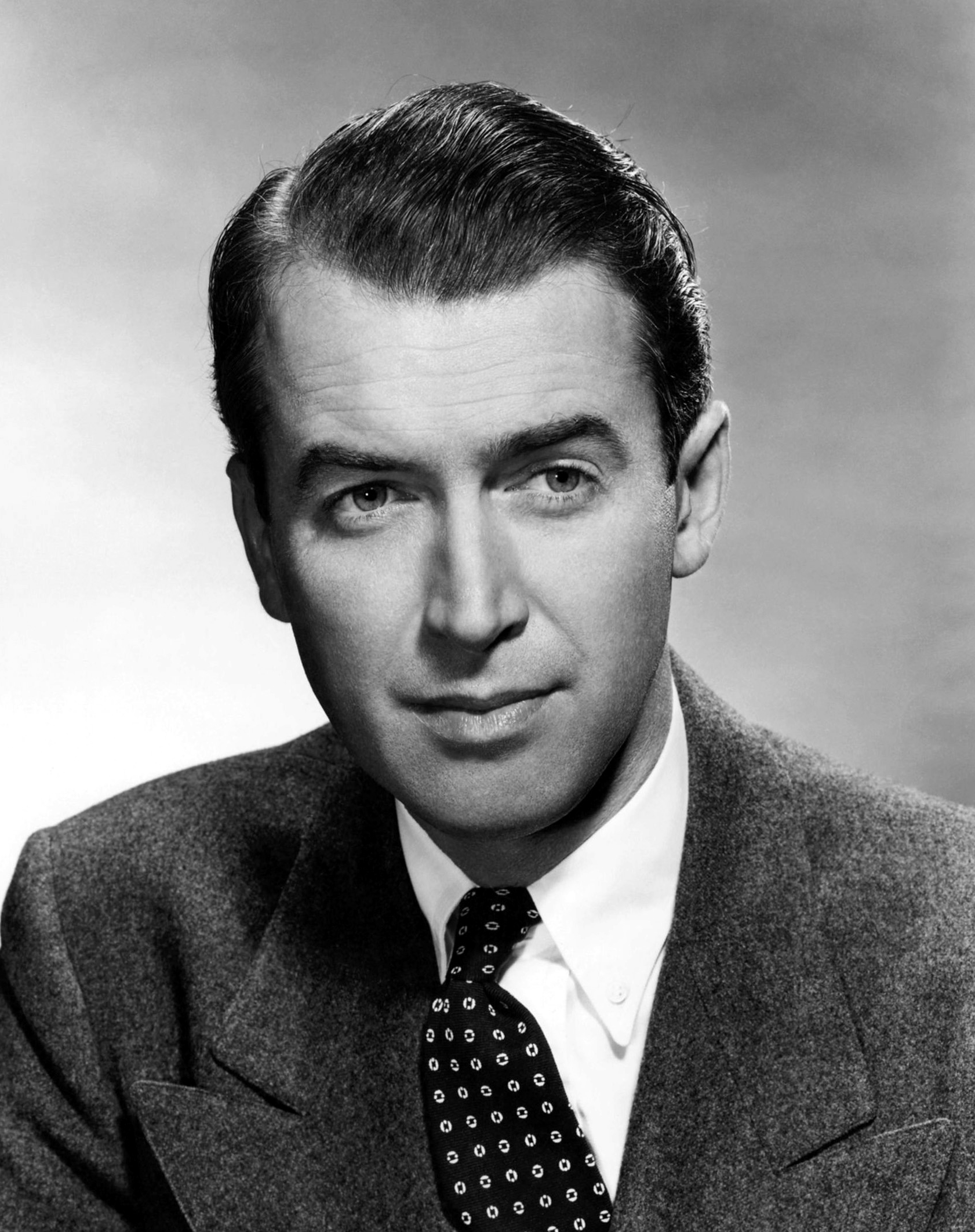
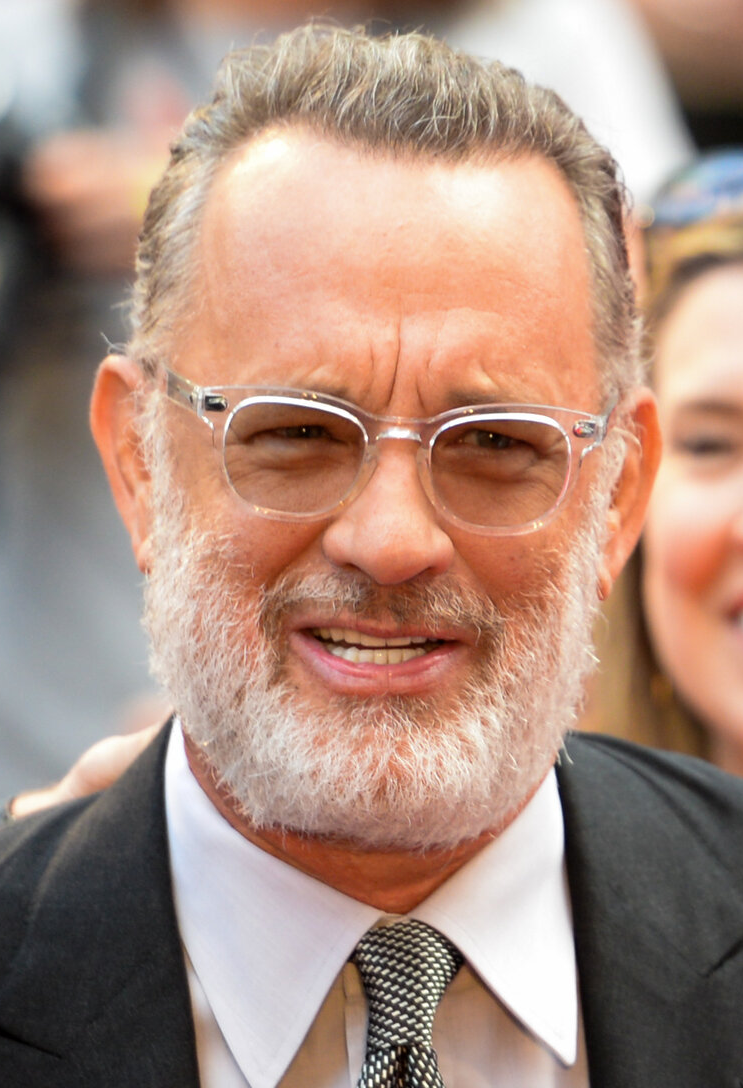
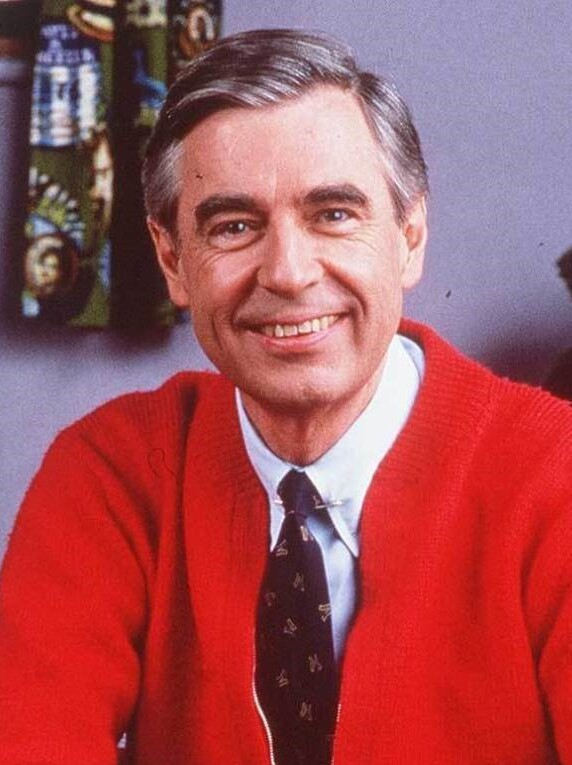
Ted Lasso has been compared with Jimmy Stewart (left), Tom Hanks (middle), and Fred Rogers (right).

Critical assessments of the character's construction and appeal were largely affirmative in response to the first season. Travers argued that Ted is "never a caricature or even an idealistic impossibility", and that the character "feels real, which is essential to the show's compassionate purpose", distinguishing him from more exaggerated optimistic television figures. Brandon Katz of Observer described Ted's "unwavering belief and steadfast kindness" as "pitch-perfect counterbalances" to the prevailing cultural mood, and called him "football's Mr. Rogers", while also acknowledging that the character's positivity risked becoming "irritatingly grating" without the counterweight of his personal difficulties. Harley similarly wrote that the character is "practically impossible not to like", and described him as a composite of James Stewart, Tom Hanks, and Fred Rogers in the retooled series incarnation. Shannon Miller wrote that Ted's goodness functions as the show's structural foundation, though she identified as a flaw the absence of a clear explanation for why the character accepts his circumstances so readily.

Several critics identified specific limitations or contradictions in the character's writing. Hale argued that a close reading of Ted reveals him to be "a nice guy whose life is complicated by an embittered, scheming woman and a wishy-washy, unappreciative woman", and who "finds solace with other men", a dynamic Hale characterized as undermining the character's ostensibly progressive framing. Benjamin Lee of The Guardian contended that the character "isn't interesting or funny or substantial enough to warrant a commercial-to-sitcom expansion", that his warmth is "well-intentioned" but also reflects an arrogance "that, at least in the early episodes, isn't explored enough", and that the "charm feels forced". Lee argued that the British supporting cast provided more nuanced characters, leaving Ted less engaging. Maureen Ryan of Vanity Fair, while broadly favorable toward the character, wrote that Sudeikis "does terrific work as Ted, especially in scenes in which we see the coach's flaws and fears", and that Ted's cheerful demeanor can function as "a way to avoid some hard truths" in a manner the show depicts self-awarely. Ben Allen of GQ argued that transforming Lasso from the buffoon of the original sketches into "an affable fish out of water" gave the character sufficient depth to sustain a full series, though he raised concerns about the thin characterization of female figures surrounding him.

Ted's depiction in the second season was received more favorably. Caroline Framke of Variety argued that Ted's inability to outrun his past "[deepened] the bruise of Season 2" and described Ted in his therapy session with Dr. Sharon as "a raw and exposed nerve shuddering at every flicker of contact", acted with "precise skill". Emily St. James of Vox praised the depiction of Lasso as emotionally available to everyone not because of his emotional maturity but because of his incapacity to manage his own feelings, feeling it a "worthwhile conversation to be having about mental health right now". St. James argued that allowing Ted, who is seemingly happy, to articulate his feelings at therapy might inspire hesitant viewers to do the same. However, Doreen St. Félix of The New Yorker described Ted and his "belief in unabating optimism" as waning against themes of self-help and therapy in the season and said that she "can’t say that [she] particularly [misses] him".

Critical response to Ted as a character became more divided with the third season. Roxana Hadadi of Vulture argued that the season was "stuck treating Ted's refusal to educate himself about his job like an aw-shucks asset", and that the series' resurgent insistence on a "Ted is always right" theme represented "an ideological backslide" from the more challenging second season. Jen Chaney, also writing at Vulture, argued that the character's persistent ignorance of the sport he coaches had curdled from charming to implausible, writing that "Ted being a kind but unprepared bumpkin was charming in season one, but he's been the coach of AFC Richmond for multiple seasons" and should by then "know some shit about soccer". Linda Holmes of National Public Radio agreed, citing Ted's ignorance of Zava, a star player; his continued reliance on Coach Beard and Roy Kent for coaching; and the credit he gives to FIFA for what he does know; and saying that there is "a solid argument that Ted does not belong in this job even more than he didn't belong in it before". Hadadi added that the third season's didactic framing of Ted's influence—wherein every deviation from his methods is punished—diminished what made the character distinctive, describing the pattern as "pervasive and pernicious".

=== Accolades ===
Jason Sudeikis won and was nominated for many awards for his portrayal of Ted Lasso.

Awards and nominations received by Jason Sudeikis for his portrayal of Ted LassoAwards and nominations received by Jason Sudeikis for Ted Lasso
Award	Year	Category	Result	Ref.
AACTA International Awards	2022	Best Actor in a Series	Nominated	
Critics' Choice Television Awards	2021	Best Actor in a Comedy Series	Won	
Critics' Choice Television Awards	2022	Best Actor in a Comedy Series	Won	
Dorian Awards	2021	Best TV Performance	Nominated	
Golden Globes	2021	Best Actor – Television Series Musical or Comedy	Won	
Golden Globes	2022	Best Actor – Television Series Musical or Comedy	Won	
Golden Globes	2024	Best Actor – Television Series Musical or Comedy	Nominated	
Hollywood Critics Association TV Awards	2021	Best Actor in a Streaming Series, Comedy	Won	
Hollywood Critics Association TV Awards	2022	Best Actor in a Streaming Series, Comedy	Nominated	
Hollywood Critics Association TV Awards	2023	Best Actor in a Streaming Series, Comedy	Nominated	
MTV Movie & TV Awards	2021	Best Comedic Performance	Nominated	
People's Choice Awards	2021	The Male TV Star of 2021	Nominated	
People's Choice Awards	2021	The Comedy TV Star of 2021	Nominated	
Primetime Emmy Awards	2021	Outstanding Lead Actor in a Comedy Series	Won	
Primetime Emmy Awards	2022	Outstanding Lead Actor in a Comedy Series	Won	
Primetime Emmy Awards	2023	Outstanding Lead Actor in a Comedy Series	Nominated	
Satellite Awards	2021	Best Actor – Television Series Musical or Comedy	Nominated	
Satellite Awards	2022	Best Actor – Television Series Musical or Comedy	Won	
Actor Awards	2021	Outstanding Performance by a Male Actor in a Comedy Series	Won	
Actor Awards	2022	Outstanding Performance by a Male Actor in a Comedy Series	Won	
Actor Awards	2024	Outstanding Performance by a Male Actor in a Comedy Series	Nominated	
TCA Awards	2021	Individual Achievement in Comedy	Nominated	
TCA Awards	2022	Individual Achievement in Comedy	Nominated	
