= Aisling Sharkey =

Irish actress

- Born: Aisling Louise Sharkey
- Education: Laine Theatre Arts
- Occupation: Actress
- Years active: 2019-present
- Television: Ted Lasso

Aisling Louise Sharkey is an Irish stage, film and television actress and singer. Her credits include Ted Lasso (2026).

== Biography ==
Sharkey first appeared in a television role at the age of 14 years-old, appearing in European fantasy television series Heirs of the Night as a teenager, filmed in Latvia and Croatia. Having attended drama school at Laine Theatre Arts in Epsom, and trained as a soprano and in dance, Sharkey appeared in 2022 action film Jurassic Park: Dominion as well as a variety of theatre work including portraying Wendy in a production of Peter Pan and Jo in an adaptation of Little Women and Agnes in Gypsy.

In 2026, Sharkey could be seen portraying Niamh Harrigan on season 4 of Apple TV series Ted Lasso, a defender on the women's team and twin sister of the character Siobhan (Rex Hayes). She had been cast as part of the Mamma Mia musical tour prior to the successful audition for the series.

== Personal life ==
From Dublin, Ireland, her mother is from Armagh and has family in County Monaghan. Later living in London, she and on-screen twin Rex Hayes bonded so well on set of Ted Lasso that they spent Christmas together with Hayes' family in Cardiff after filming.

== Filmography ==
Year	Title	Role	Notes
2019–2020	Heirs of the Night	Ivy	24 episodes
2022	Jurassic World: Dominion	Madison	Film
2026	Ted Lasso	Niamh Harrigan	Main cast (season 4)
