= George Montagu =

George Montagu may refer to:

- George Montagu (17th century politician) (1622–1681), English politician
- George Montagu (naturalist) (1753–1815), English naturalist
- George Montagu (Royal Navy officer) (1750–1829)
- George Montagu (18th century politician) (1713–1780), British politician, MP for Northampton
- George Montagu, 1st Earl of Halifax (c. 1684–1739), English politician
- George Montagu-Dunk, 2nd Earl of Halifax (1716–1771), British statesman of the Georgian era
- George Montagu, 1st Duke of Montagu (1712–1790), British peer
- George Montagu, 4th Duke of Manchester (1737–1788), British peer
- George Montagu, 6th Earl of Sandwich (1773–1818), British peer
- George Montagu, 6th Duke of Manchester (1799–1855), British peer
- George Montagu, 8th Duke of Manchester (1853–1892), British peer
- George Montagu, 9th Earl of Sandwich (1874–1962), British peer and Conservative politician
- George Montagu (police officer), Australian police officer
