= Rex Hayes =

Welsh actress

- Education: Royal Welsh College of Music & Drama
- Occupation: Actress
- Years active: 2015-present
- Television: Ted Lasso

Rex Hayes is a Welsh stage and television actor. Their credits include Ted Lasso (2026).

== Career ==
From Cardiff, Hayes was a keen footballer before no longer being able to play youth football in boys' teams. Hayes attended a Welsh-language school and was regular part of the Eisteddfod, later attending drama school at the Royal Welsh College of Music & Drama.

Hayes debuted in the West End in the Aaron Sorkin adaptation of To Kill a Mockingbird. Hayes also played Peter Pan at the Sherman Theatre and appeared in an adaptation of Coram Boy.

Hayes television credits include The Bastard Executioner and Welsh-set Bregus, Bang and The Pact for BBC One. In 2026, Hayes could be seen portraying Siobhan Harrigan on season 4 of Apple TV series Ted Lasso, an Irish defender on the women's team and twin sister of the character Niamh (Aisling Sharkey).

== Personal life ==
Hayes identifies as non-binary and uses they/them pronouns. They have spoken about coming out as queer in their early 20s.

A football fan, Hayes played grassroots football in London with Victoria Park Vixens and is a supporter of Liverpool.

== Partial filmography ==
Year	Title	Role	Notes
2015	The Bastard Executioner	Nia	1 episode
2017-2020	Bang	Mel	6 episodes
2019	35 awr	Ree	8 episodes
2021	Bregus	Carly	2 episodes
2021	The Pact	Morgan	1 episode
2026	Ted Lasso	Siobhan Harrigan	Main cast (season 4)
