= List of West Ham United F.C. managers =

West Ham United Football Club, an association football club based in Stratford, London, have had twenty permanent managers in their history and an additional three caretaker managers. Up until 1989 the club had only had five different managers. Before the appointment of Gianfranco Zola in 2008 the club never had an overseas manager, with the only non-Englishman being the Scot, Lou Macari. The current manager is the Portuguese Nuno Espírito Santo, appointed in 2025 after Graham Potter was dismissed. Three former West Ham players have taken on temporary managerial roles at the club, between permanent managers. Ronnie Boyce briefly took the reins, in February 1990, between Macari's resignation and the appointment of Billy Bonds. Former Hammers player and board member Trevor Brooking was briefly in charge during two separate spells as caretaker manager in 2003, first during the illness of Glenn Roeder and again between Roeder's sacking and the appointment of Alan Pardew. Former player Kevin Keen has been caretaker manager twice; immediately prior to Zola's appointment in 2008 and after the sacking of Avram Grant in 2011.

== Managers ==
Manager	Caretaker Manager	Period	G	W	D	L	Win %	Honours/Notes (major honours shown in bold)
(England) Syd King		1901–32	638	248	146	244	38.87	Club's longest serving manager (31 years). FA Cup runners-up 1923
(England) Charlie Paynter		1932–50	480	198	116	166	41.25	
(England) Ted Fenton		1950–61	484	193	107	184	39.87	Division Two Champions 1957–58
(England) Ron Greenwood		1961–74	613	215	165	233	35.07	**FA Cup winners 1964**, **UEFA Cup Winners Cup winners 1965.** League Cup runners-up 1966.
(England) John Lyall		1974–89	**708**	**277**	176	255	39.12	**FA Cup winners 1975, 1980.** Highest league finish in club's history (3rd in Division One 1985–86). UEFA Cup Winners' Cup runners-up 1976; League Cup runners-up 1981.
(Scotland) Lou Macari		1989–90	38	14	12	12	36.84	
	(England) Ronnie Boyce	1990	1	0	1	0	0.00	
(England) Billy Bonds		1990–94	227	99	61	67	43.61	
(England) Harry Redknapp		1994–01	327	121	85	121	37.00	UEFA Intertoto Cup joint winners 1999 (European qualification). Club's highest Premier League finish (5th, 1998–99)
(England) Glenn Roeder		2001–03	86	27	23	36	31.40	
	(England) Trevor Brooking	2003	14	9	4	1	**64.29**	
(England) Alan Pardew		2003–06	163	67	38	58	41.10	Championship Play-off Winners 2005, FA Cup runners-up 2006 (UEFA Cup qualification)
(England) Alan Curbishley		2006–08	71	28	14	29	39.44	
	(England) Kevin Keen	2008	1	0	0	1	0.00	
(Italy) Gianfranco Zola		2008–10	80	23	21	36	28.75	Club's first non-British manager.
(Israel) Avram Grant		2010–11	47	15	12	20	31.91	Club's first non EU manager.
	(England) Kevin Keen	2011	1	0	0	1	0.00	
(England) Sam Allardyce		2011–15	181	68	46	67	37.57	Championship Play-off Winners 2012.
(Croatia) Slaven Bilić		2015–17	111	42	30	39	37.84	
(Scotland) David Moyes		2017–18	31	9	10	12	29.03	
(Chile) Manuel Pellegrini		2018–19	64	24	11	29	37.50	
(Scotland) David Moyes		2019–2024	231	103	45	83	44.59	**UEFA Europa Conference League winners 2023.** Highest win percentage of club's permanent managers. Highest Premier League win percentage of club's Premier League era managers.
(Spain) Julen Lopetegui		2024–2025	22	7	5	10	31.82	
(England) Graham Potter		2025	25	6	5	14	24.00	
(Portugal) Nuno Espírito Santo		2025–2026	53	19	15	19	35.85	
(England) Scott Parker		2026	2	0	1	1	0	

== Managerial History ==
Prior to the appointment of West Ham's first manager, team selection was the responsibility of a committee. Lew Bowen served as secretary for the club's initial season of 1900–01.

=== Syd King ===
In May 1902, West Ham appointed full-back Syd King as secretary-manager. King had replaced Bowen as secretary at the start of the 1901–02 season, combining the role with his playing duties. A player with West Ham's predecessor team Thames Ironworks, he continued to play for the newly formed club until 1903. He remained manager until 1932, when he was sacked. He later committed suicide.

=== Charlie Paynter ===
King was replaced by Charlie Paynter, who had been appointed reserve-team trainer in 1902 and was promoted to first-team trainer when Syd King was appointed as manager. Paynter was appointed on 1 November 1932.

=== Ted Fenton ===
Paynter remained as manager until 1950 when he was replaced by Ted Fenton on 1 August 1950. Fenton was a PT instructor for the Army in North Africa and Burma during World War II. He had, since 1948, been Paynter's assistant manager. Fenton's greatest achievement was in winning the Division Two championship in the 1957–58 season and thereby securing the club top flight football for the first time since 1932. The 1957–58 and 1958–59 seasons saw West Ham achieve two goalscoring records; in 1957–58, the club scored 101 league goals, and in 1958–59, the club scored 59 home league goals in a season, which was even more remarkable it being the season following promotion to Division One. During his time, Fenton was responsible for establishing the Academy and the development of youth teams that reached the FA Youth Cup final twice in three years over the period 1956–59. With the help of chairman Reg Pratt, he was also responsible for encouraging as many players as possible to take their FA Coaching Badges to ensure the players had something to fall back on when their playing days were over. Seven of the West Ham 1964 FA Cup winning team had either been signed by Ted Fenton from other clubs, or had worked their way up from The Academy during his time as manager. Fenton's departure from West Ham in March 1961 has never been fully explained by the club. Under strain and on sick-leave and with West Ham's league position suffering, he left the club under circumstances which both he and the club decided would remain confidential.

=== Ron Greenwood ===
In April 1961, Pratt selected Ron Greenwood as manager. His reign at West Ham brought them sizeable success. He oversaw the development of players such as the 1966 FIFA World Cup-winning trio of Bobby Moore, Geoff Hurst and Martin Peters, and under him the Hammers won the FA Cup in 1964 and the European Cup Winners' Cup in 1965, the first two major trophies of their history. He moved upstairs in 1974, becoming the club's general manager for the next three years, with John Lyall being placed in charge of the first team.

=== John Lyall ===
Lyall was appointed on 16 April 1974. In 1975, at the end of his first season as manager, West Ham won the FA Cup final and reached the final of the European Cup Winners' Cup the following year, losing 4–2 to Anderlecht. West Ham, however, slipped down to the Second Division in 1978. Lyall attempted to rebuild the side and made significant purchases in Phil Parkes, £565,000 from Queens Park Rangers, a world record for a goalkeeper and Ray Stewart from Dundee United for £430,000, a British record for a teenager. West Ham returned to the First Division in 1981, winning the title by a 13-point margin.

During their exile from the top flight, on 10 May 1980 West Ham beat Arsenal in the FA Cup final, the last lower league side to do so. In their 1981 promotion season, Lyall also led the Hammers to the final of the League Cup – where they drew 1–1 against Liverpool, before losing the replay 2–1, having led early in the match. They also reached the quarter-finals of the European Cup Winners' Cup in the same year.

West Ham spent the first four years back in the top flight consolidating their position. Long serving Trevor Brooking and Frank Lampard both retired and Billy Bonds was struggling with the effects of first team football. Lyall again attempted to rebuild the team bringing Frank McAvennie from St Mirren and Mark Ward from Oldham Athletic. 28 goals from McAvennie, 25 from Tony Cottee and an eighteen-game unbeaten run saw Lyall take West Ham to their highest ever league finish in the 1985–1986 First Division campaign when they finished third behind champions Liverpool and runners-up Everton. However, they were unable to compete in the UEFA Cup because of the ban on English teams from European competition arising from the previous year's Heysel Disaster. Lyall failed to build on the side which finished third in the First Division. McAvennie was sold to Celtic in 1987 and Cottee to Everton in July 1988 for a British transfer record of £2.05 million. Their replacements combined with the additions of Tommy McQueen, Gary Strodder, David Kelly, Allen McKnight, Liam Brady, Julian Dicks and the return of McAvennie in March 1989 failed to save West Ham from relegation in May 1989. Lyall was sacked on 5 June 1989. He was awarded an ex gratia payment of £100,000 but left the club in what Lyall described as "upsetting" circumstances, meriting only 73 words in a terse acknowledgement of his service in the club programme. Lyall left West Ham after 34 years service.

=== Lou Macari ===
For their next manager, West Ham did not appoint from within the club – former Swindon Town manager Lou Macari was given the job on 3 July 1989. He had a reputation for discipline and tried to change the training and dietary habits of the players. This met with some disapproval within the playing ranks. Macari bought in new recruits in future regular players, Luděk Mikloško, Trevor Morley, Martin Allen and Ian Bishop. His team struggled to make much headway towards promotion and by the end of 1989 were in tenth place in The Second Division. They were also knocked out of the FA Cup by Torquay United on 6 January 1990 in the Third Round. Shortly after, it emerged that Macari was being investigated for betting irregularities while at his former club, Swindon Town.

=== Billy Bonds ===
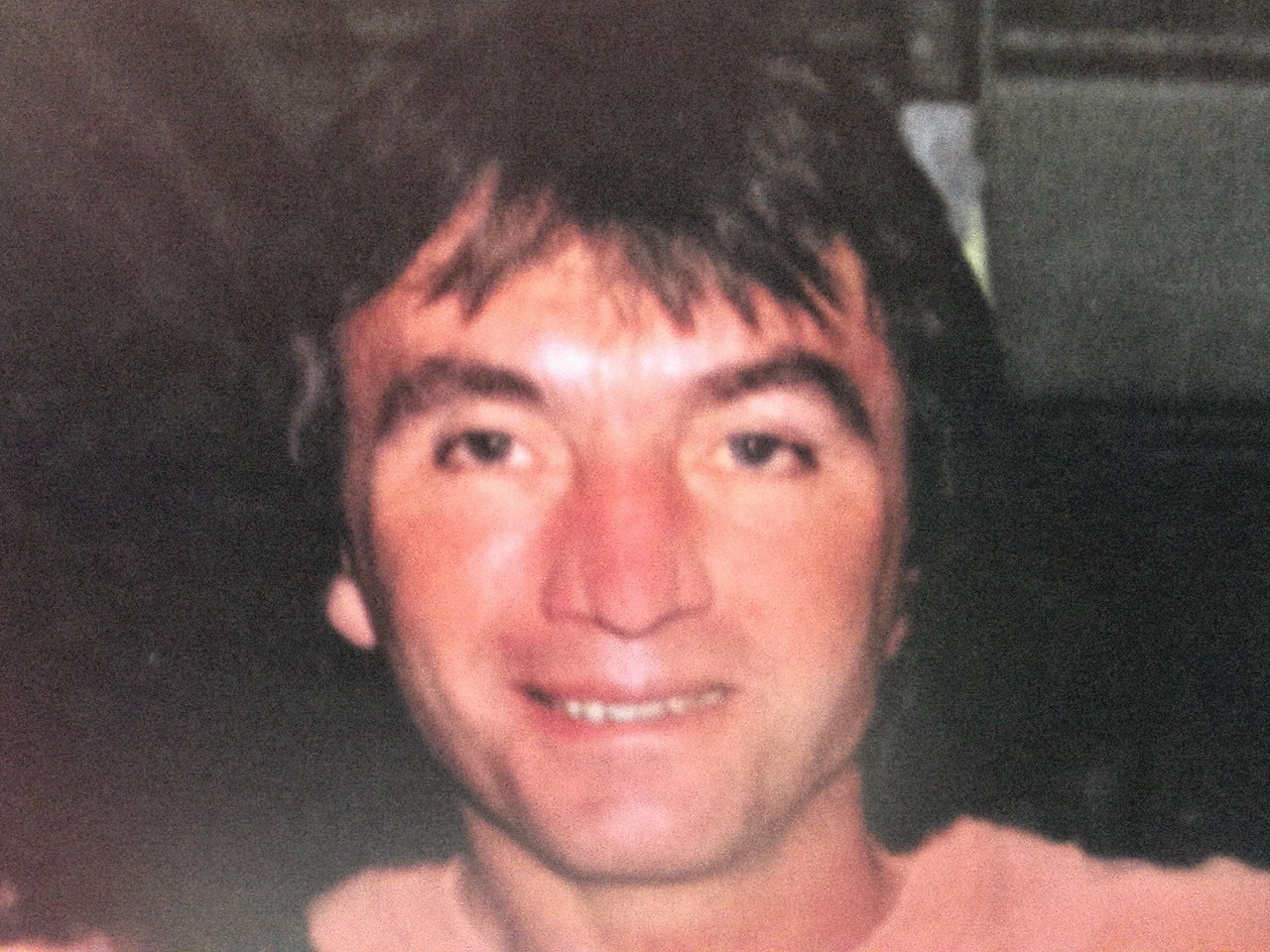
Billy Bonds

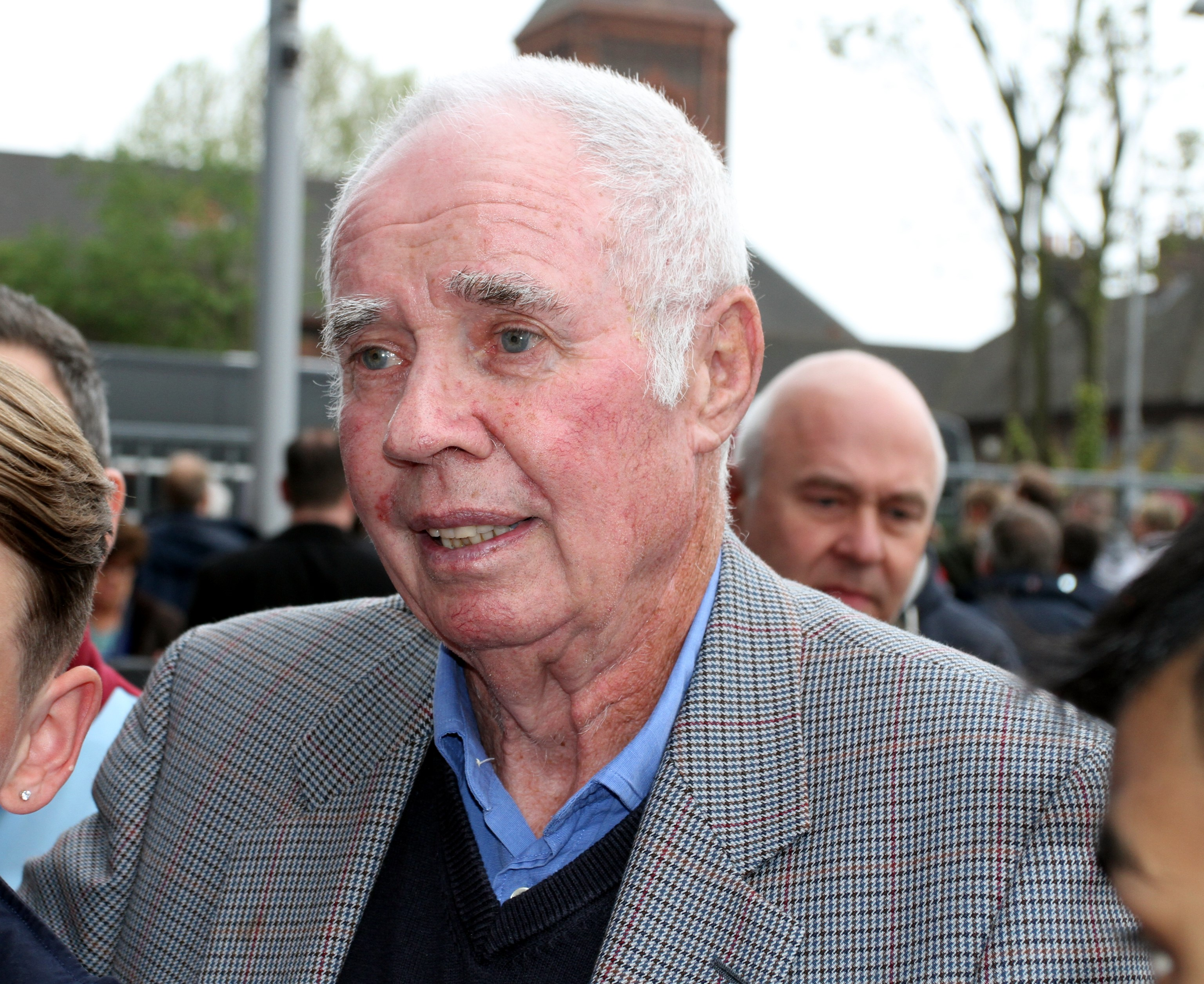
Ronnie Boyce

Macari resigned in February 1990 in order to "clear his name". Former player Ronnie Boyce stood in as manager for a single game. The next manager was Billy Bonds, a popular choice who took-up the post on 23 February 1990. It was too late for Bonds to turn the season around, however, and they finished seventh. In the following season, with Trevor Morley scoring 17 goals and McAvennie 11, Bonds guided West Ham to second place and promotion to the First Division and an FA Cup semi-final place before being beaten in controversial circumstances by Nottingham Forest. Now back in the top flight, Bonds saw West Ham through one of their most controversial seasons. With the club planning to introduce a bond scheme, there was crowd unrest. New players Mike Small and Clive Allen were unable to provide the goals and the team finished bottom with only nine wins, only three after the turn of the new year. With the club now back in the second tier, Bonds appointed Harry Redknapp as his assistant at the start of the season. Bond's West Ham finished second and again gained promotion, this time to the FA Premier League. With Morley and Allen scoring 40 goals, they gained promotion on the last day of the season with a 2–0 home win against Cambridge United. With the team in the FA Premier League there was a need to rebuild the team. Oxford United player Joey Beauchamp was recruited for a fee of £1.2 million. Shortly after arriving at the club, he complained that he should not have made the move as it was too far from his Oxford home. Bonds found this attitude hard to understand compared with his own committed, never-say-die style. This was the first evidence of his losing appetite for the modern game and modern player. Fifty-eight days later, Beauchamp was signed by Swindon for a club-record combined fee of £800,000, which included defender Adrian Whitbread going in the opposite direction; Whitbread was valued at £750,000 in the deal. Assistant manager Harry Redknapp was also now taking a bigger role in the transfer of players, with the club's approval. With rumours of his old club, AFC Bournemouth being prepared to offer him a position the West Ham board and their managing director, Peter Storrie made a controversial move. Anxious not to lose Redknapp's services the West Ham board offered Bonds a place away from the day-to-day affairs of the club, on the West Ham board. This would have allowed them to appoint Redknapp as manager. Bonds refused the post offered and walked away from the club. His accusations of deceit and manipulation by the board and by Redknapp have continued to cause ill-feeling. Peter Storrie claimed that they had handled the situation correctly, saying, "If Harry had gone to Bournemouth, there was a good chance Bill would have resigned anyway, so we were in a no-win situation. We're sad that Bill is going, and it's a big blow but it's time to move on and we have appointed a great manager."

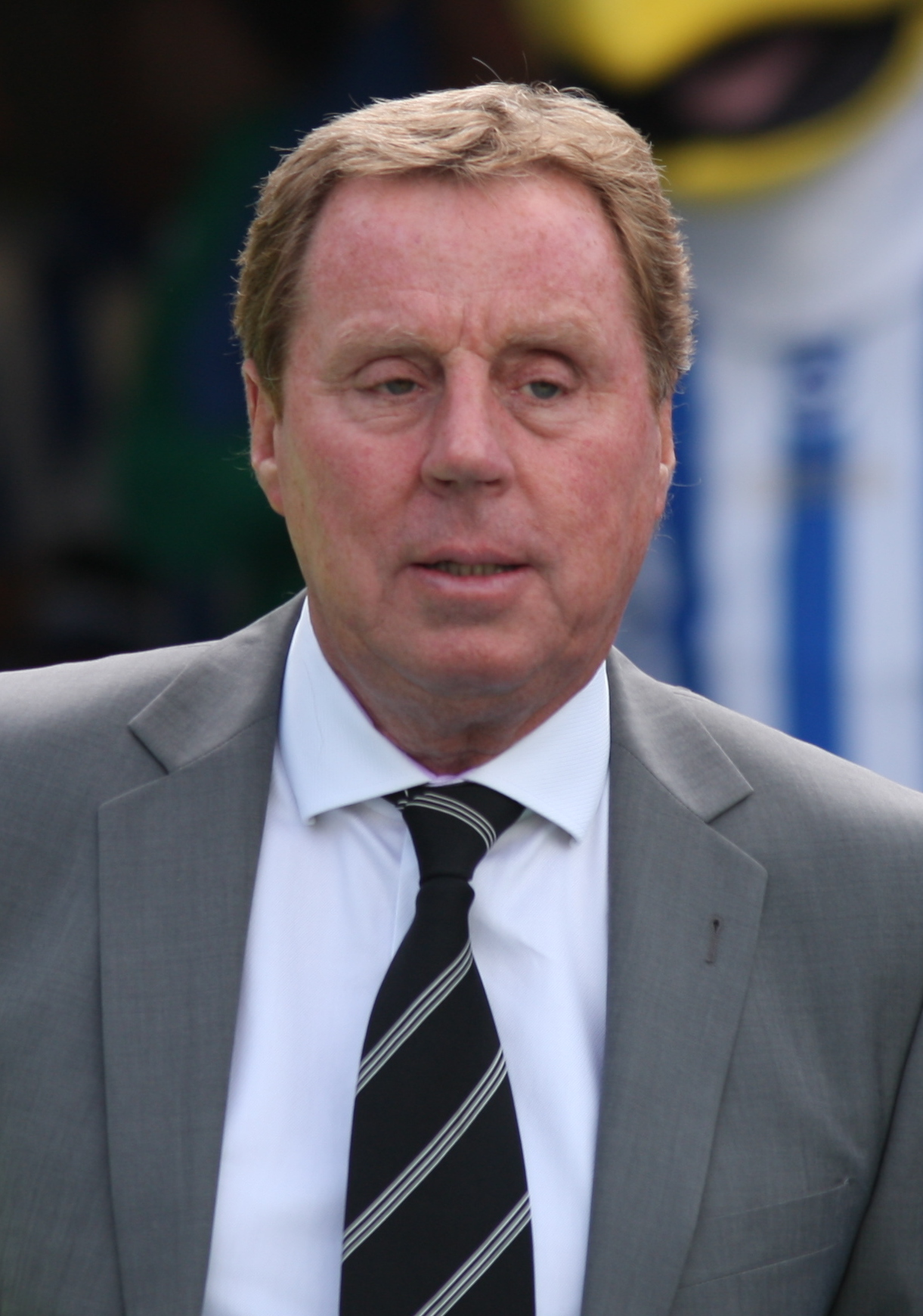
Harry Redknapp

=== Harry Redknapp ===
Redknapp became manager on 10 August 1994. His time at West Ham was notable for the turnover of players during his tenure and for the level of attractive football and success which had not been seen since the managership of John Lyall. Over 134 players passed through the club while he was manager, producing a net transfer fee deficit of £16 million, even after the £18 million sale of Rio Ferdinand. Some, however, were notably successful, such as the signings of Stuart Pearce, Trevor Sinclair, Paolo Di Canio, John Hartson, Eyal Berkovic and Ian Wright. Some were expensive, international players who failed at West Ham, such as Florin Raducioiu, Davor Šuker (who earned as much in wages as the revenue gained from one entire stand yet made only eight appearances), Christian Bassila (who cost £720,000 and played only 86 minutes of football), Titi Camara, Gary Charles (whose wages amounted to £4.4 million but made only three starts for the club), Rigobert Song, Paulo Futre and Marco Boogers (a player often quoted as one of the biggest failures in the Premier League). His first season in charge saw West Ham fighting the threat of relegation until the last few weeks. His third season saw another relegation battle. Always willing to enter the transfer market, Redknapp bought in the winter transfer window John Hartson and Paul Kitson who added the impetus needed at the season's end.

In 1999, the club finished in fifth position, their highest place since 1986. They also won the Intertoto Cup to qualify for the UEFA Cup. Things started to falter for Redknapp with the sale for £18m to Leeds United of Rio Ferdinand in November 2000. Redknapp used the transfer money poorly with purchases such as Ragnvald Soma (who cost £800,000 and played only seven league games), Camera and Song. Redknapp felt he needed more funds with which to deal in the transfer market. Chairman Brown lost patience with Redknapp due to his demands for further transfer funds. In May 2001, he left the club following a meeting with Brown and a dispute over the club's potential summer transfer fund. His assistant Frank Lampard, Sr., also left, making the sale of his son Frank Lampard, Jr., inevitable; in the summer of 2001, he joined Chelsea for £11 million.

=== Glenn Roeder ===
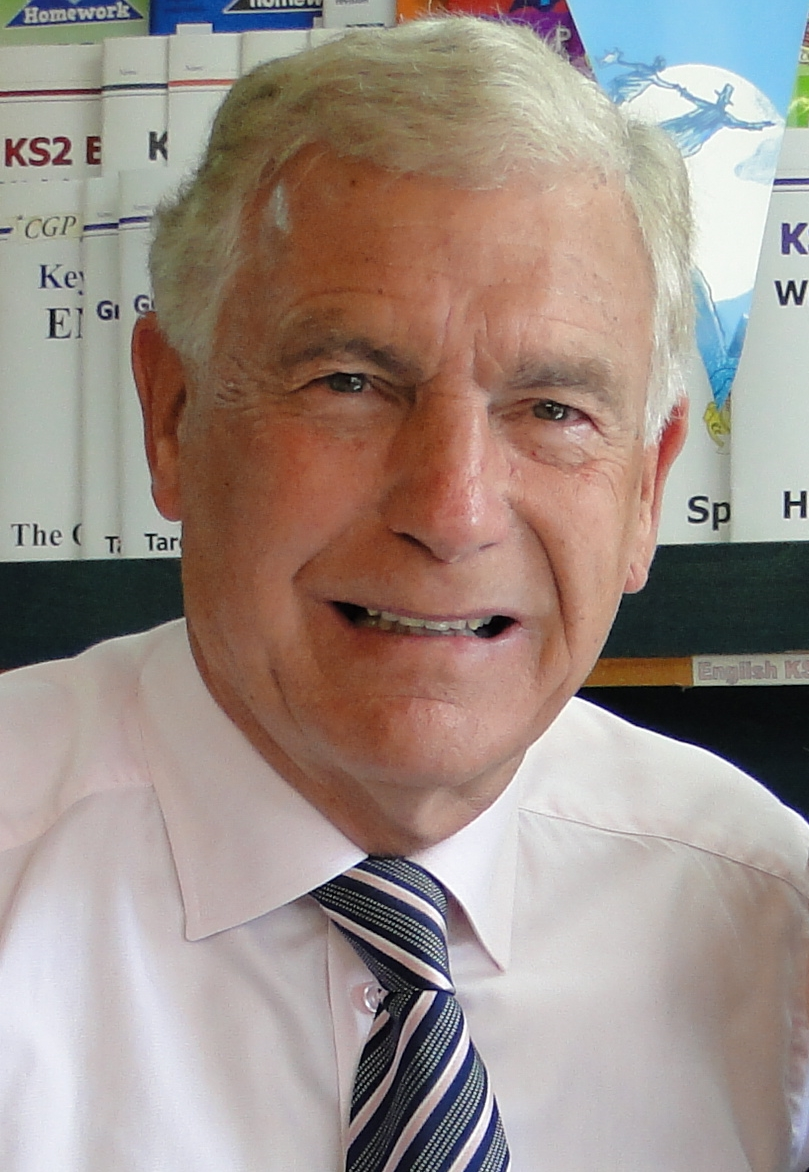
Trevor Brooking

With several names such as former player Alan Curbishley now linked with the job, chairman Brown recruited from within the club. Reserve team coach Glenn Roeder was appointed manager on 9 May 2001. He had already failed in management with Gillingham, where he lost 22 of the 35 games he managed, and Watford. His first big signings were the return of Don Hutchison for £5 million and Czech centre-back Tomáš Řepka. Finishing seventh in his first season Roeder made the error of not buying new players for the 2002–03 season. Numerous fall outs with Paolo Di Canio and a series of injuries to Frédéric Kanouté left the team with too few strikers. They took until 28 September 2002 to win their first game. Veterans Les Ferdinand, Rufus Brevett and Lee Bowyer were recruited in the winter of 2002 but results barely improved. Bowyer's transfer in January 2003 was controversial and Roeder came under criticism for signing him. After a game against Middlesbrough, Roeder, in his office at Upton Park, suffered a blocked blood vessel in his brain. Now needing medical help and recuperation, former stalwart Trevor Brooking stood in as caretaker manager. Despite not losing another match, the Hammers were relegated on the last day of the season at Birmingham City with a record for a relegated club of 42 points. Nine seasons of top tier football were over. Many top players – including Joe Cole, Paolo Di Canio and Frédéric Kanouté – all left the club.

The next season now in the second tier Roeder resumed as manager. Results were still poor and after an away defeat to Rotherham United, he was sacked on 24 August 2003. Brooking again took over as caretaker. He lost only one game, a 2–0 away defeat to Gillingham and is known as "the best manager West Ham never had".

=== Alan Pardew ===
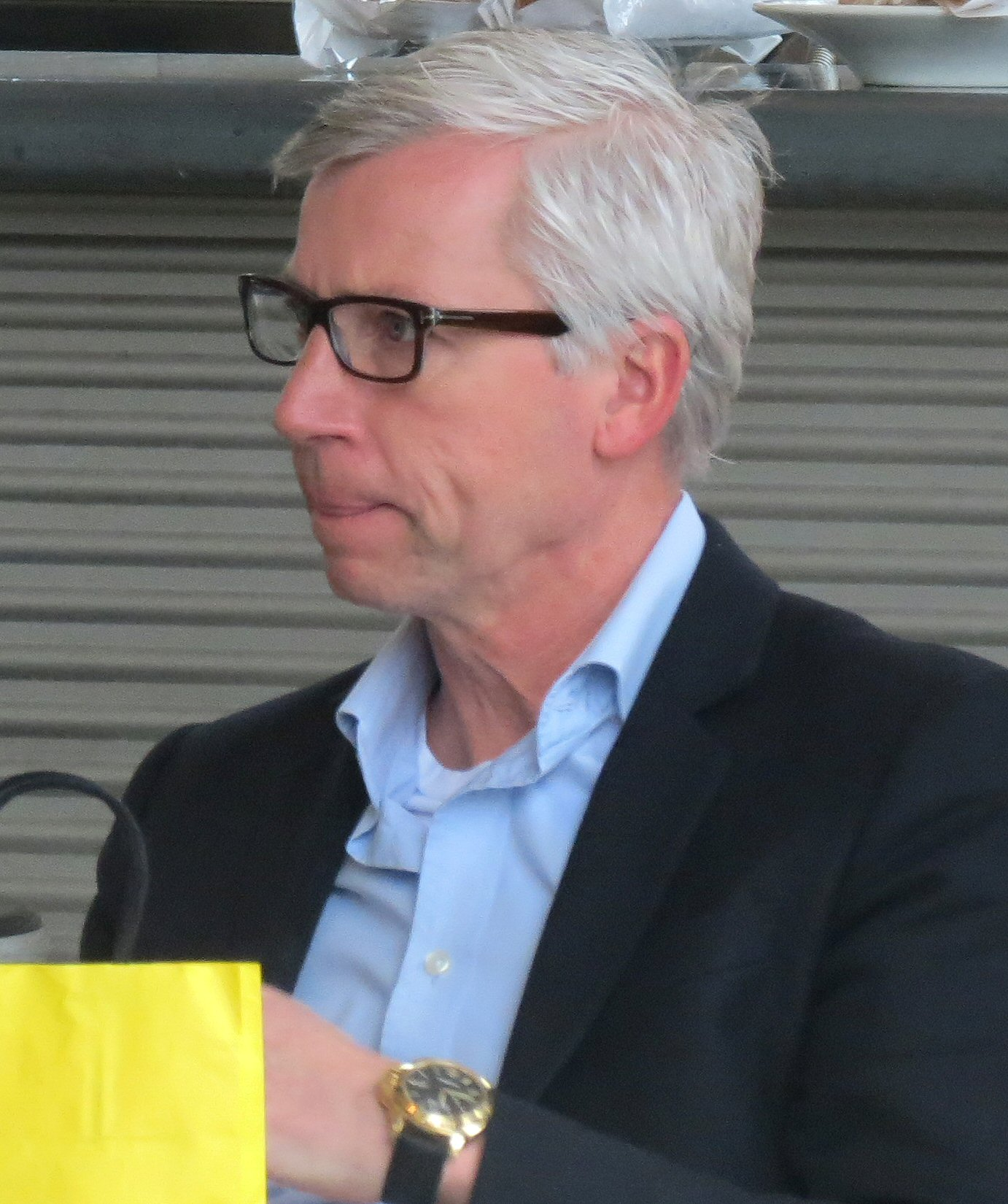
Alan Pardew

Former Crystal Palace player and the manager of Reading, Alan Pardew was lined up to be the next manager. Reading and their chairman, John Madejski, were reluctant to let him leave. After serving a period of notice and gardening leave and with West Ham paying Reading £380,000 in compensation, he was appointed manager on 18 October 2003, their tenth permanent manager. Pardew set out to rebuild the side bringing in Nigel Reo-Coker, Marlon Harewood and Brian Deane. In his 1st season in charge they made the playoff final only to lose to Crystal Palace. His signings of Bobby Zamora, Matthew Etherington and veterans Chris Powell and Teddy Sheringham saw West Ham finishing in sixth position and subsequently beating Preston North End 1–0, thanks to a Zamora goal, in the 2005 playoff final to return to the Premier League. Of securing promotion, Pardew said, "It's a team effort. We defended well and we're back where we belong."

In the 2005–06 season, having signed striker Dean Ashton he guided them to ninth place and an FA Cup final where they were beaten on penalties by Liverpool. In the close season, Pardew signed Carlton Cole from Chelsea, with Pardew saying of the deal, "This is a great coup for West Ham. Several clubs came in for Carlton and it is a great compliment to what we have achieved here, that he has signed for us."

The 2006–07 season started poorly. Now back playing in Europe in the UEFA Cup, they were beaten in the first round 4–0 by Palermo. The team went ten games without a win and in October 2006 they were beaten in the League Cup by fourth tier side Chesterfield. The club were on their worst run of results for 74 years. Pardew was acting more like a highly paid player than a manager by turning up for training driving an expensive Ferrari car and was boasting of his wealth having earned £1.5 million in bonuses in the previous season. His actions did not help team morale. There were accusations that several young players had got carried away with one successful season in the top flight. After a 4–0 away defeat to Bolton Wanderers, Pardew was sacked on 11 December 2006 by new chairman Eggert Magnússon.

=== Alan Curbishley ===
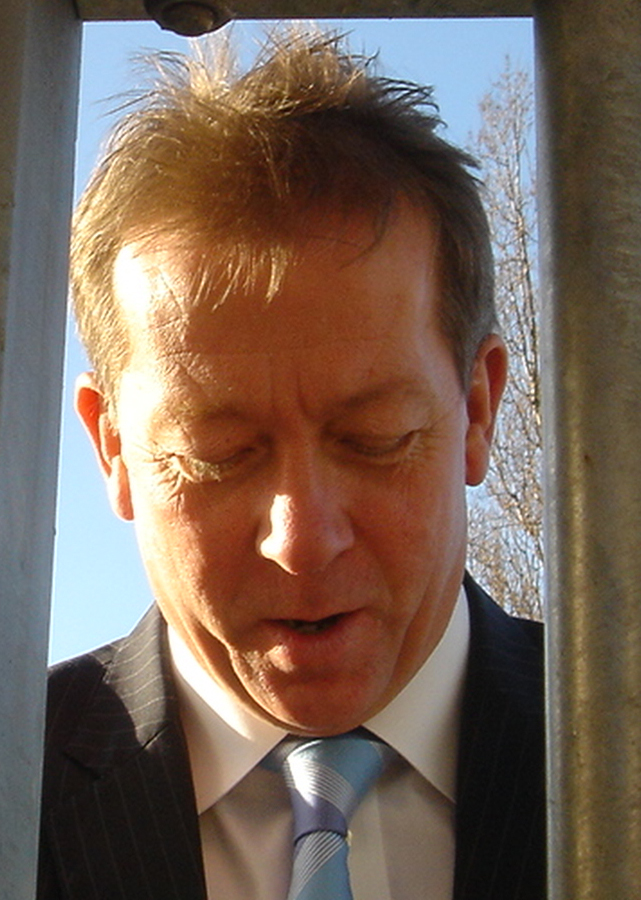
Alan Curbishley

The new owners wasted little time is searching for a replacement, and on 13 December 2006, Alan Curbishley was appointed. During his 15 years as manager of Charlton Athletic, Curbishley produced an established mid-table side. He continued in the same vein at West Ham and in his first season in charge, 2006–07, they finished 15th in the Premier League. He was also required to deal with the controversy caused under Pardew's managership by the signings of Argentine internationals Javier Mascherano and Carlos Tevez. He rarely used Mascherano who made only five league appearances. He also had a poor relationship with Tevez. West Ham struggled and were embroiled in problems with the FA over the legalities concerning the contracts of Mascherano and Tevez. Curbishley finally consistently picked Tevez at the start of 2007. His 26 games and 7 goals proved to be vital. West Ham maintained their Premier League status only on the last day of the season, with Tevez scoring the only goal at Old Trafford against Manchester United. Many, including Lord Griffiths, who ruled on the legality of Tevez's contract, thought maintaining their Premier League had been as much to do with the efforts of Tevez as the management skills of Curbishley. Tevez left the club in the summer and Curbishley produced what he was renowned for; a comfortable mid-table finish of tenth place with a degree of stability in defence due to the performances of Lucas Neil and Matthew Upson.

The start of the next season saw him in conflict with the management. Suffering financially due to the effects of the 2008–11 Icelandic financial crisis on chairman and owner, Björgólfur Guðmundsson, who had seen his wealth disappear, and because of the costly signings of players such as Kieron Dyer, Craig Bellamy and Freddie Ljungberg, the board saw fit to transfer players without the manager's approval. Anton Ferdinand and George McCartney were sold to Sunderland against Curbishley's wishes. As he was contractually in control of all first team transfers, Curbishley felt he had no choice but to resign, on 3 September 2008. Kevin Keen was appointed as caretaker while the search for a new manager went underway.

=== Gianfranco Zola ===
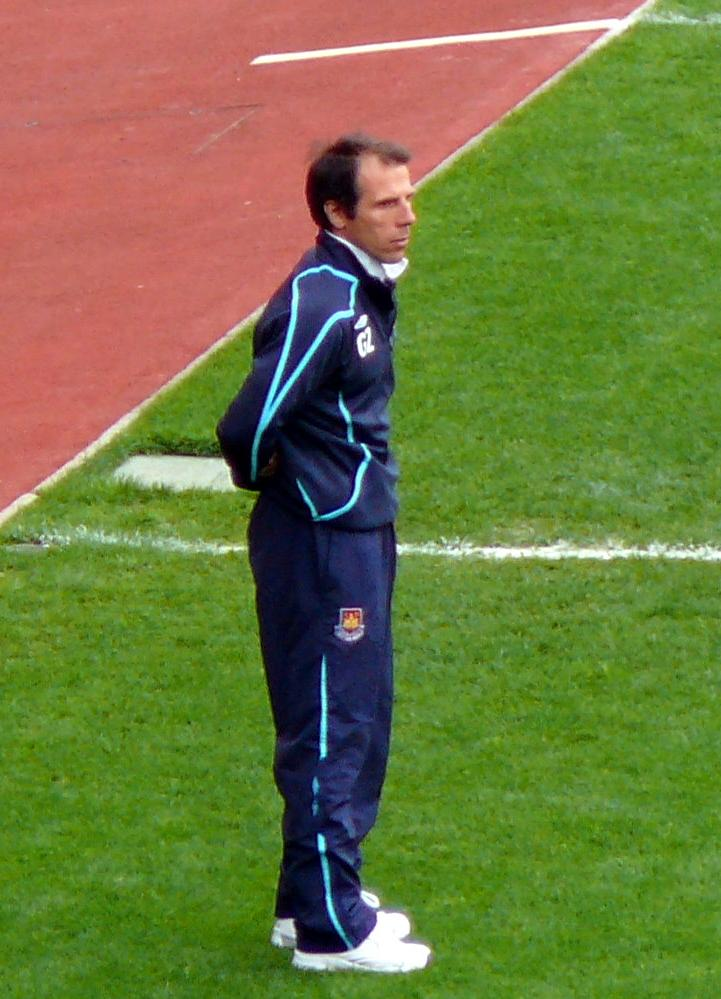
Zola

The next manager was another, like Glenn Roeder, untried at the top level: the Italian Gianfranco Zola was appointed on 15 September 2008. His only other managerial role being the Italy national under-21 team. His first season brought a ninth-place Premier League finish largely through the 12 league goals of Carlton Cole, the only West Ham player to make double figures. Zola's second, however, was a continual fight near the bottom of the league table, with the club finishing 17th and only five points away from relegation. His transfers dealings, particularly the reportedly club record £9 million fee paid for untried teenager Savio Nsereko, had failed to enhance the team. He also signed South African international striker Benni McCarthy, who failed to score at all. By this time, the new club owners, David Gold and David Sullivan, were in place and the club £38 million in debt. They sought out a more experienced manager and on 11 May 2010, Zola was sacked after less than two years as manager. Zola later admitted he had lacked the experience to tackle the pressures of top-flight management.

=== Avram Grant ===
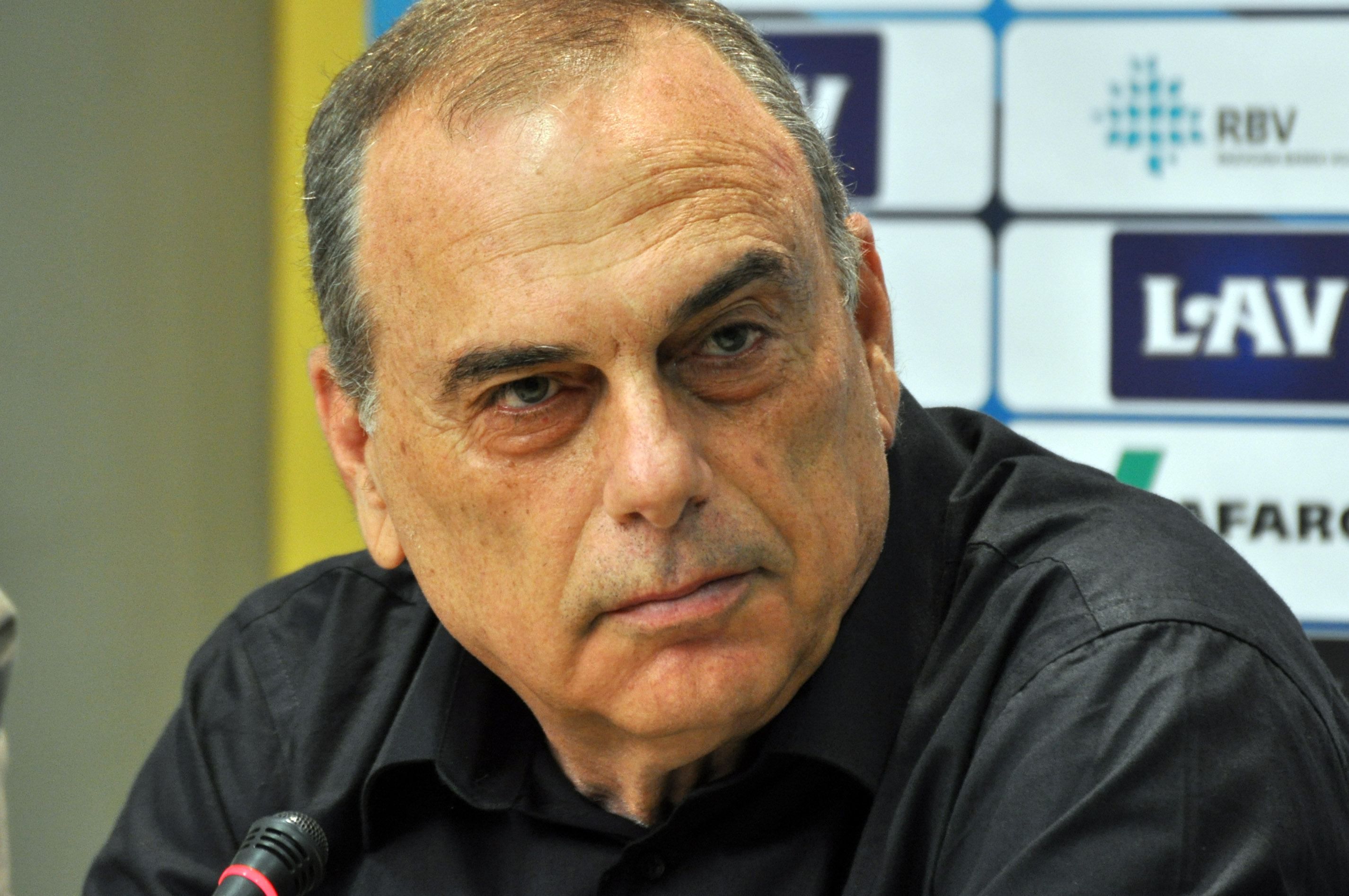
Avram Grant

Israeli Avram Grant had been manager with Chelsea and had taken them to the UEFA Champions League final in 2008. He was appointed on 3 June 2010. His signings of Pablo Barrera and Frédéric Piquionne added little to the team. His teams performed poorly and although he brought in striker Demba Ba, West Ham were relegated in May 2011. Grant was sacked on the day of relegation. He had been in charge for less than a year. Kevin Keen stood in for one game as manager, a 3–0 home defeat to Sunderland. The mood at the club was low. Club co-chairman David Sullivan later admitted he had made an error in employing Grant as manager.

=== Sam Allardyce ===
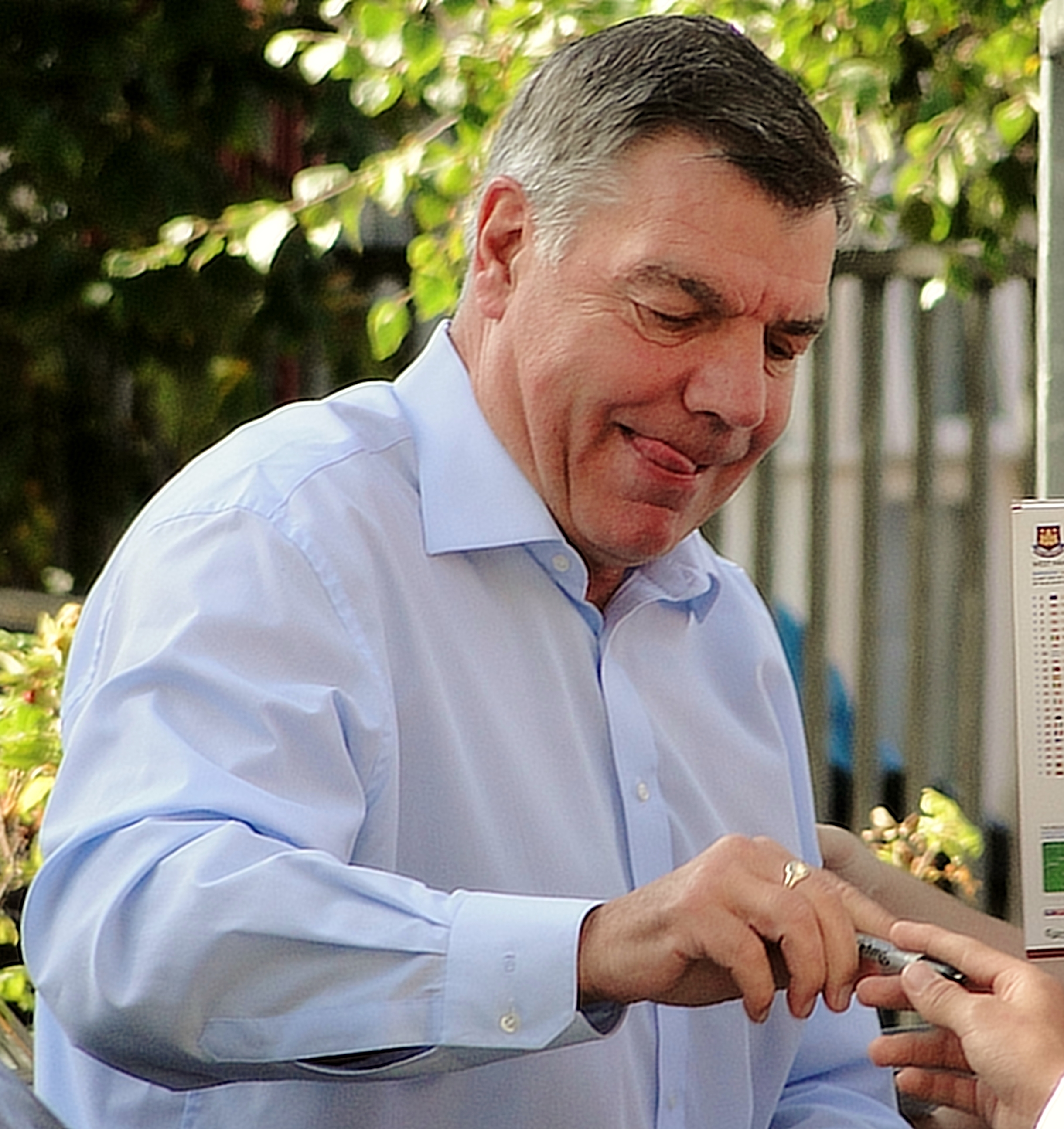
Allardyce at the Boleyn Ground

In the summer of 2011, the West Ham owners turned to experienced manager Sam Allardyce. His years with Bolton Wanderers had seen a style of long ball football, but had also seen them qualify for European competition. He signed new captain, Kevin Nolan, whom he had worked with before at Bolton and Newcastle United. Despite Allardyce's style of play coming under criticism from fans, he guided West Ham to immediate promotion. After finishing third in the Championship, they won the 2012 play-off final against Blackpool at Wembley to gain promotion. In his first Premier League season as manager, the club finished tenth and Allardyce was rewarded with a new contract in May 2013. In July 2013, co-chairman David Gold defended Allardyce's style of football, saying, "Sam could not be described as a pussy cat or a cute panda, someone you might want to pick up and give a big cuddle to and that is why he may be hard to love, but you cannot question the job he has done at West Ham."

Allardyce left West Ham on 24 May 2015, the final day of the Premier League season, after his contract was not renewed. Informed of the club's decision not to renew his contract on 22 May, Allardyce said that he had already decided not to renew saying, "I didn't want to stay. I suppose you could say it was mutual if they didn't want me to stay either." His West Ham side had finished 12th in the League, one place higher than in 2013–14, but after a promising start to the 2014–15 season, poor results meant supporters had turned against him.

=== Slaven Bilić ===
On 9 June 2015, Slaven Bilić was appointed as the club's new manager on a two-year contract, after having left Beşiktaş in May. As a former West Ham player, he made 54 appearances as a defender between 1996 and 1997. Bilić was already a fan favourite due to his time playing at the club. Upon joining, he said, "I remember West Ham as a special club. My last club, Beşiktaş, was that kind of club. It's not about the size — there is something special about them — they are a cult club." In Bilić's first season as manager, West Ham finished seventh in the Premier League. Bilić was sacked on 6 November 2017.

=== David Moyes ===
Former Preston North End, Everton, Manchester United, Real Sociedad and Sunderland manager David Moyes was appointed as successor to Slaven Bilić on 7 November 2017. Moyes was brought in with the club 18th in the league and flirting with relegation. The club ended the season in 13th position, with Moyes overseeing 9 wins, 10 draws and 12 losses from his 31 games in charge. On 16 May 2018, it was confirmed that Moyes' contract had not been renewed and that he had left his role at West Ham.

=== Manuel Pellegrini ===
Manuel Pellegrini was appointed as the new manager of the club and as a successor of David Moyes on 22 May 2018, after having left his previous club Hebei China Fortune. In Pellegrini’s first season in charge West Ham finished in 10th place, their first top ten place since 2016.

West Ham broke their transfer record twice under Pellegrini paying £36m for Felipe Anderson in 2018 and £45m for striker Sebastien Haller in 2019. They spent £155m in transfer fees while he was in charge, £71m in the summer before the 2019-20 season. In September they were knocked out from the EFL Cup losing 4-0 to Oxford United of League One. He was sacked by the club on 28 December 2019 after a 2–1 home loss to Leicester City, their fourth straight home defeat, with the club in 17th place and having won only five league games all season. His time at West Ham saw a win rate of 38.98% of all games played.

=== David Moyes (second spell) ===
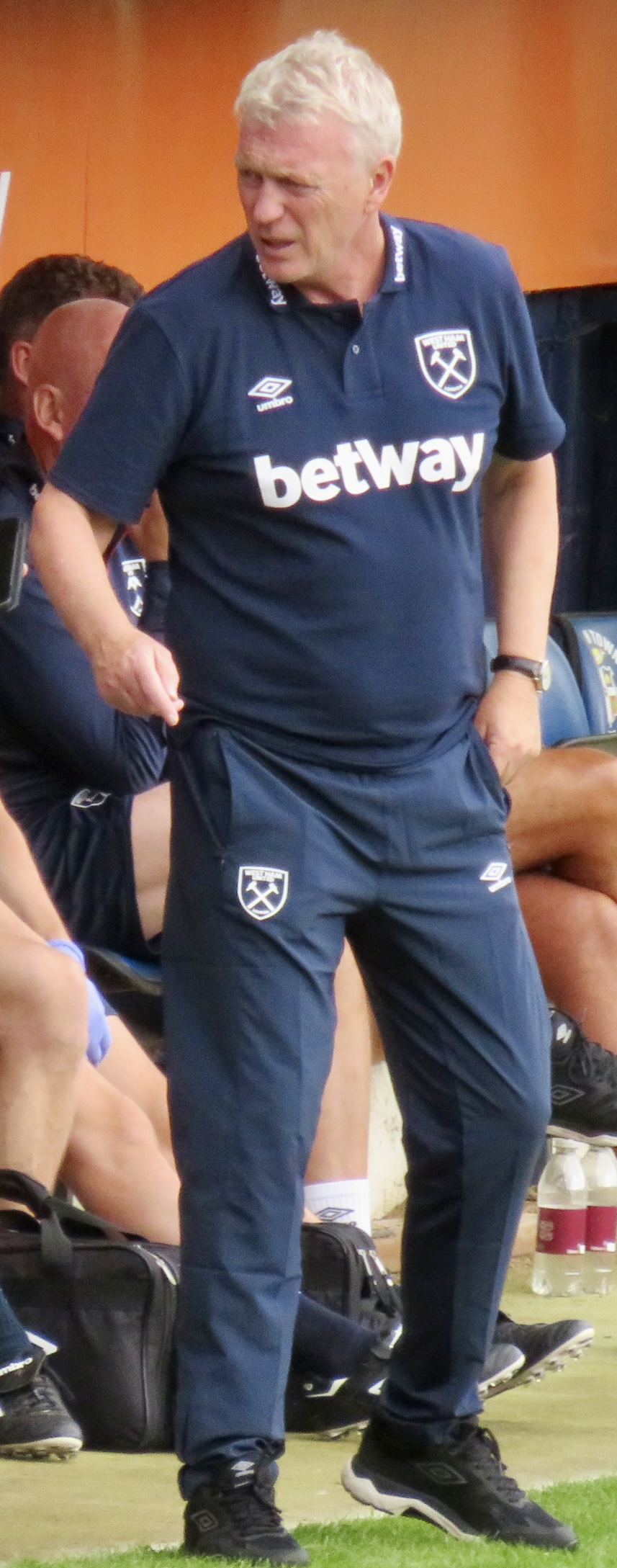
David Moyes

Moyes returned as West Ham manager on 29 December 2019, signing an 18-month contract. He steered the club away from relegation in the 2019-20 season with West Ham finishing 16th. In Moyes' first full season in charge, he led the club to a 6th place finish, qualifying for the Europa League. The following year, West Ham reached the semi-final of the Europa League, before losing to Eintracht Frankfurt 3-1 on aggregate as well as finishing 7th in the Premier League and qualifying for the Europa Conference League. West Ham won the competition the next year, beating Fiorentina 2-1 in the final in Prague, thereby qualifying for a third consecutive season of European football for the first time in their history. In May 2024, West Ham announced that Moyes would be leaving the club at the end of the 2023–24 season, the end of his contract. In his final season they reached the quarter-finals of the 2023–24 Europa League before being beaten by Bayer Leverkusen, finished 9th in the Premier League but did not qualify for European football for the 2024–25 season despite being in qualifying positions during the season. In four seasons, he managed 261 matches achieving 112 victories and three top-ten Premier League finishes, and in his second spell had the highest win percentage of any West Ham manager.

=== Julen Lopetegui ===
In May 2024, Spaniard Julen Lopetegui was appointed as new West Ham manager on a two-year contract with the option for a third year. He had previously managed in the Premier League with Wolverhampton Wanderers.

Lopetegui was dismissed by West Ham United on 8 January 2025 after a disappointing start to the season.

=== Graham Potter ===
Graham Potter was appointed as West Ham United's new manager on 9 January 2025. The timing of the appointment was regarded by some as controversial as the dismissal of Lopetegui and subsequent appointment of Potter had been widely reported in the footballing press for some days before Lopetegui was dismissed. Potter was appointed on an initial two-and-a-half year contract with his first game in charge being the FA Cup third round match against Aston Villa on 10 January.

=== Nuno Espírito Santo ===
On 27 September 2025, Nuno Espírito Santo was appointed head coach on a three-year contract, following the dismissal of Graham Potter on the same day.
