= 3rd Astra TV Awards =

2024 American television programming awards

- Date: January 8, 2024
- Site: Biltmore Hotel; Los Angeles, California
- Hosted by: Aida Rodriguez

Highlights
- Most wins: Succession (5)
- Most nominations: Yellowjackets (11)
- Website: theastras.com

Television/radio coverage
- Network: ABS-CBN News; KNEKT Television Network; YouTube (@TheAstraAwards)

The 3rd Astra TV Awards, presented by the Hollywood Creative Alliance, initially scheduled to take place on August 12 and 13, 2023, took place on January 8, 2024, at the Biltmore Hotel in Los Angeles, and streamed live on YouTube. The ceremony, produced by DIGA Studios and Content.23 Media, was hosted by comedian Aida Rodriguez. The nominations were announced on July 11, 2023.

Additionally, this was the first year where these nominations were announced alongside the inaugural Astra Creative Arts TV Awards nominations. The live-streamed event was broadcast globally, beginning at 6:30 p.m. PDT/9:30 p.m. EDT. The Hollywood Creative Alliance also revealed a new partnership with ABS-CBN, who served as the global broadcast partner for the HCA Astra TV Awards and HCA Astra Film Awards. Both ceremonies aired in 247 countries and territories in addition to the live stream on the official HCA YouTube channel and KNEKT.tv. Furthermore, the combined Astra Creative Arts TV Awards and Astra Film Creative Arts Awards ceremonies both took place at City Market Social House in Los Angeles on February 26.

In terms of the main television awards, Yellowjackets led the nominations with 11, followed by Party Down with 10; Abbott Elementary and The Boys received nine each. Channelwise, Netflix led the nominations with 39, followed by Hulu with 33; HBO and Apple TV+ followed with 31 and 29, respectively. This year, the Astra TV Awards spread across 25 Broadcast and Cable, 22 Streaming, and 26 Creative Arts categories.

== Winners and nominees ==
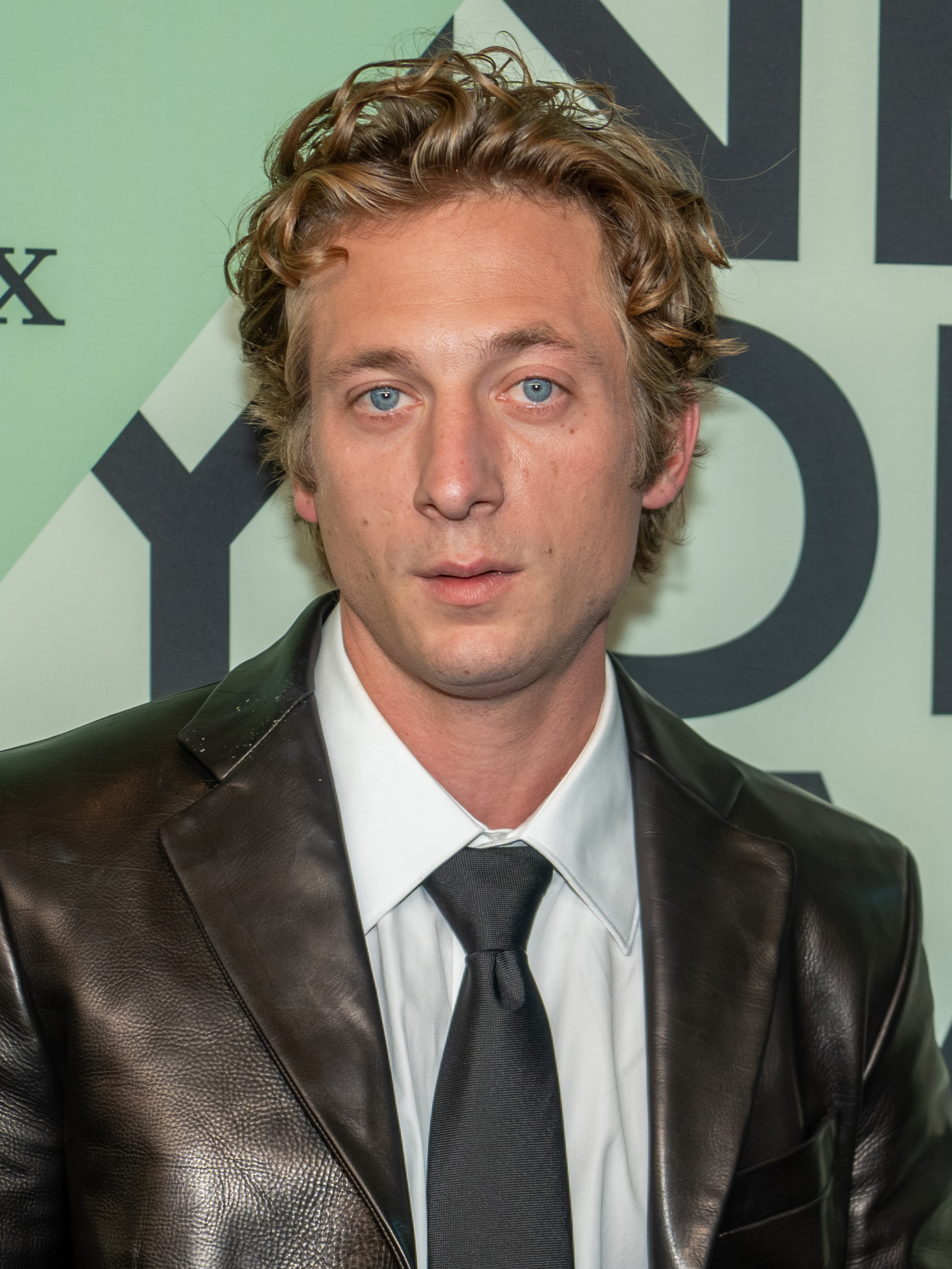
Jeremy Allen White, Best Actor in a Streaming Series, Comedy winner

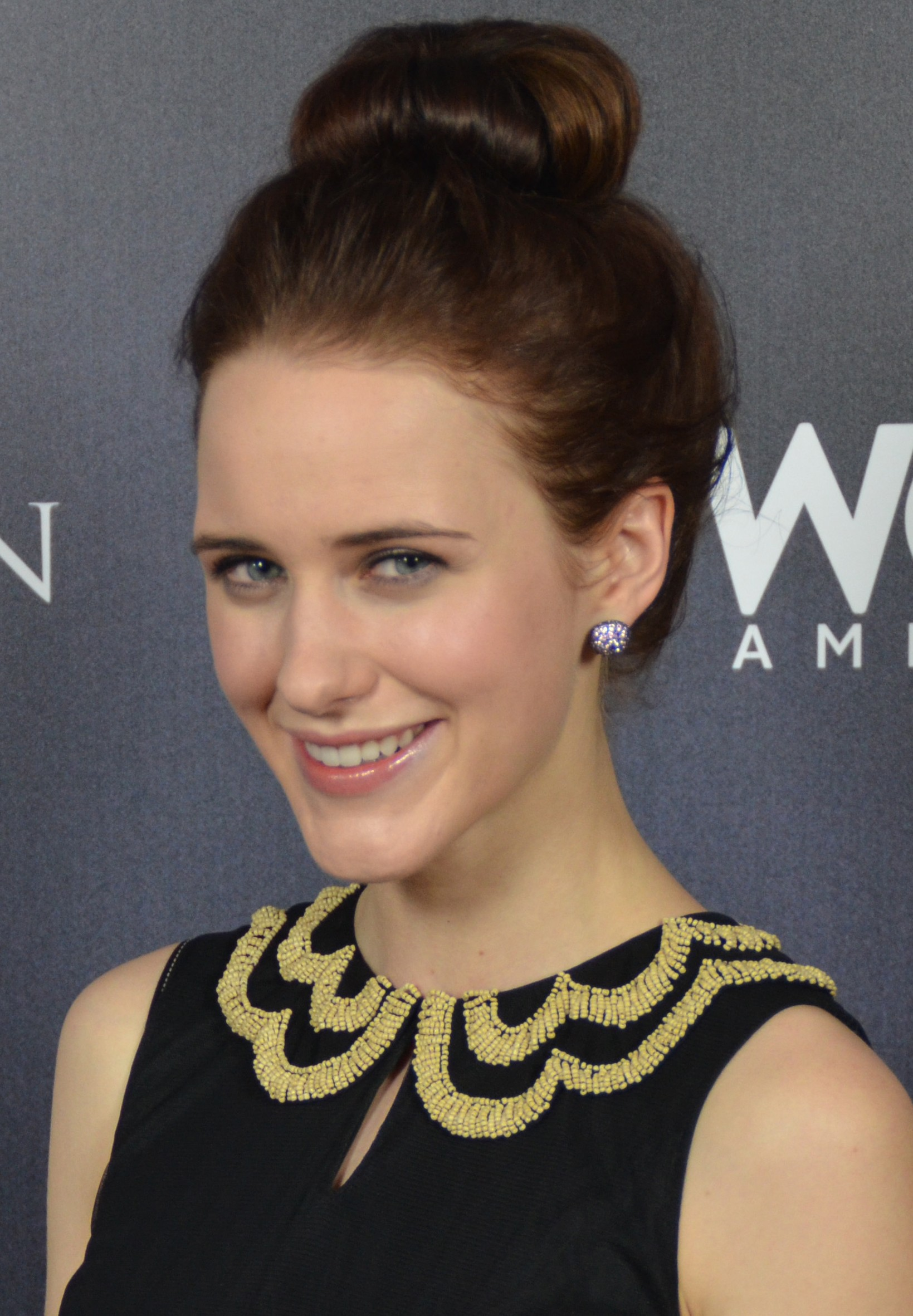
Rachel Brosnahan, Best Actress in a Streaming Series, Comedy winner

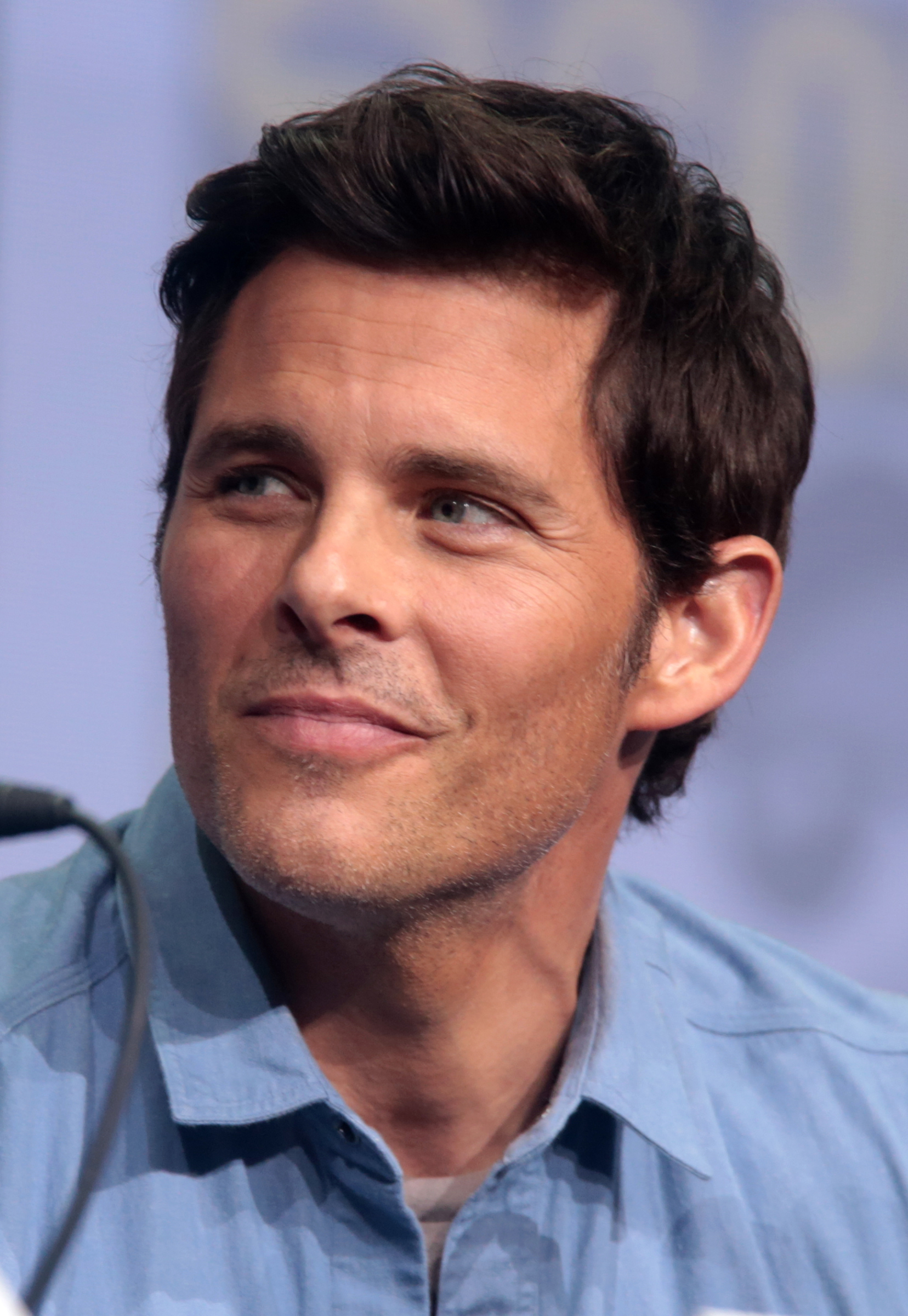
James Marsden, Best Supporting Actor in a Streaming Series, Comedy winner

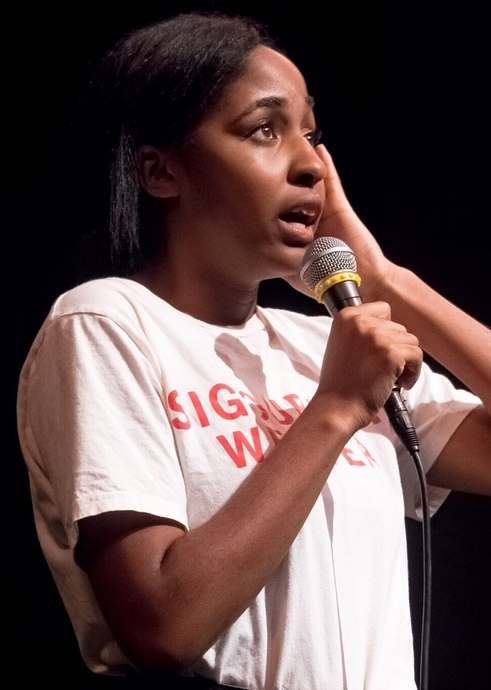
Ayo Edebiri, Best Supporting Actress in a Streaming Series, Comedy co-winner

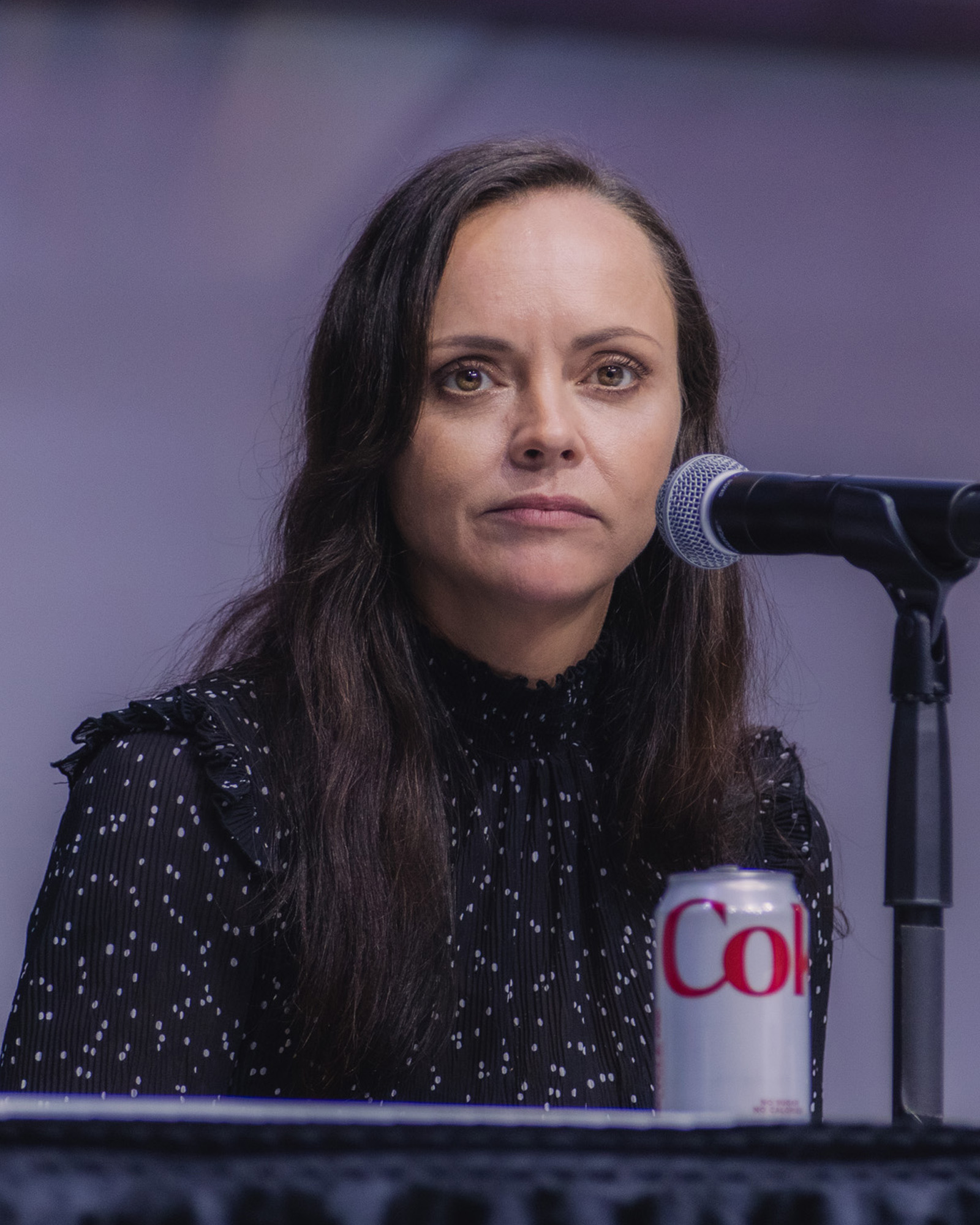
Christina Ricci, Best Supporting Actress in a Streaming Series, Comedy co-winner

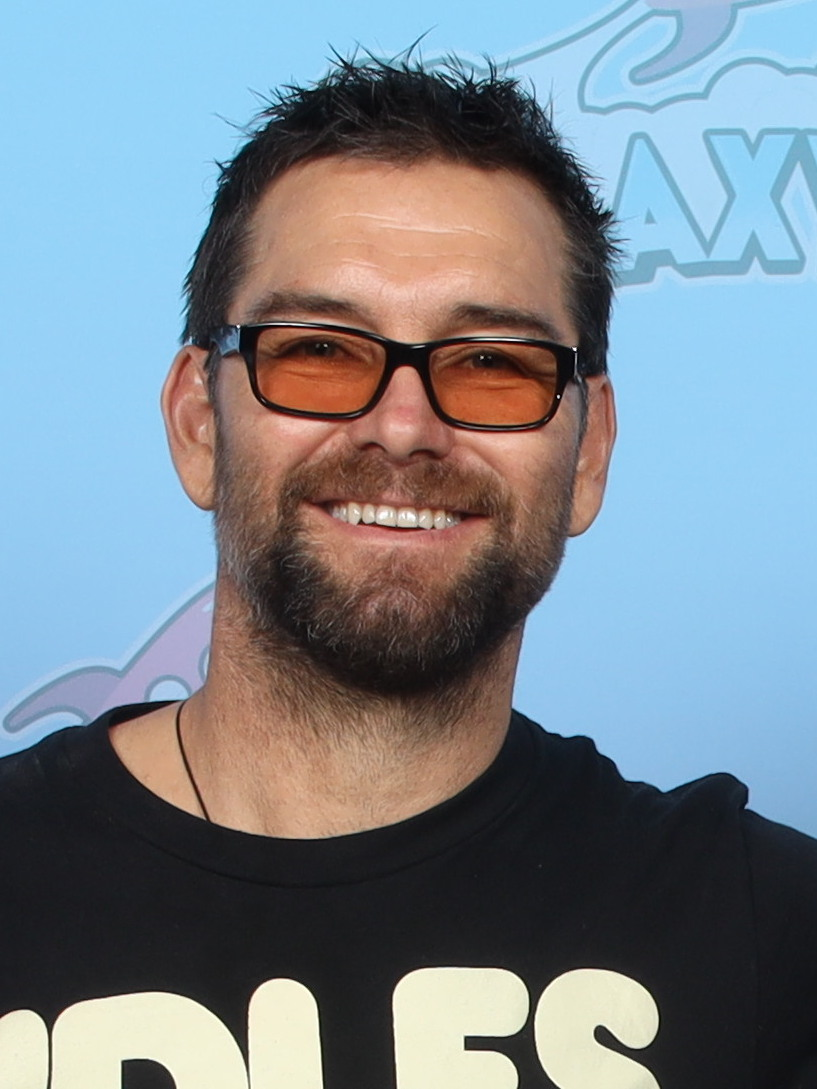
Antony Starr, Best Actor in a Streaming Series, Drama winner

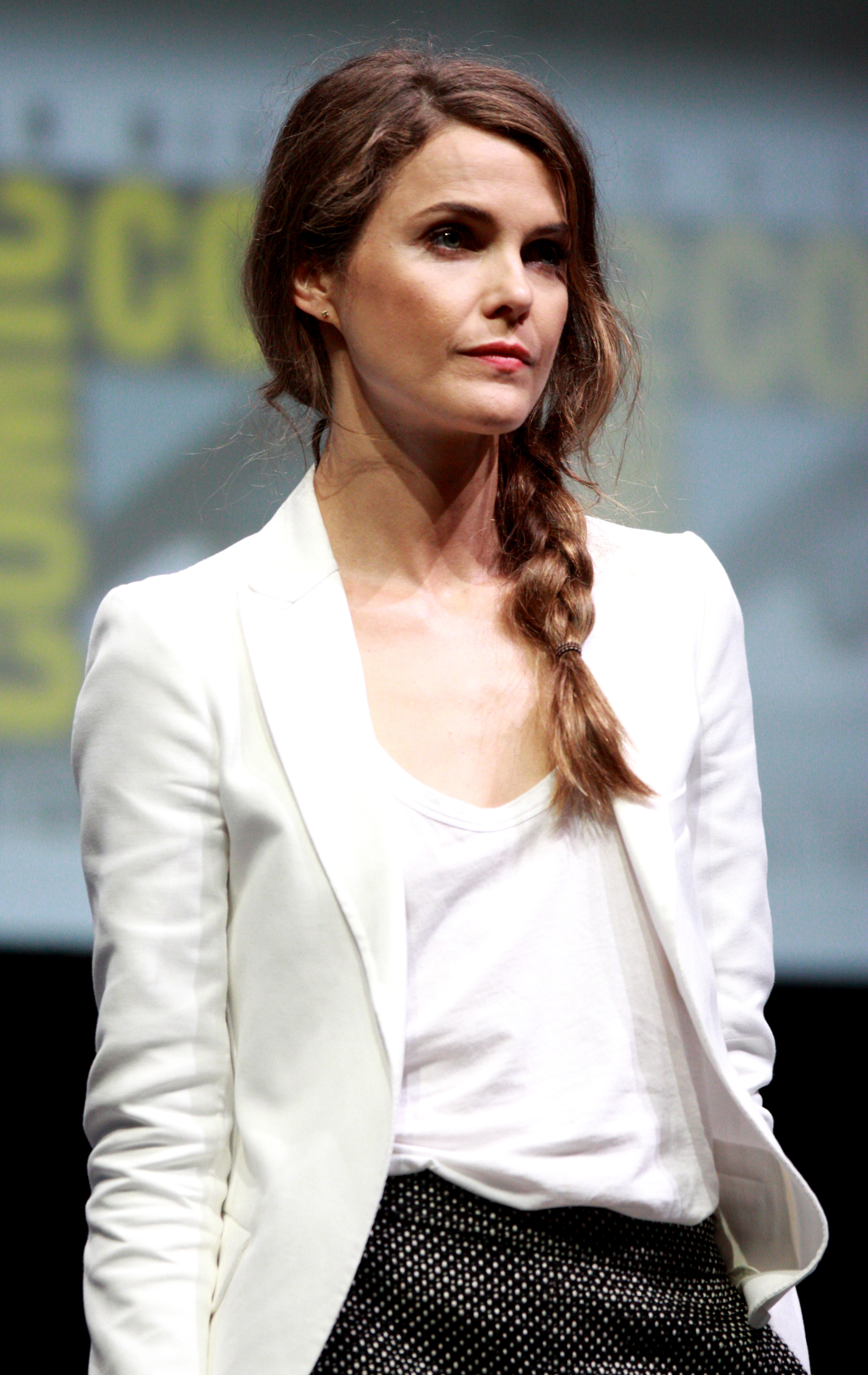
Keri Russell, Best Actress in a Streaming Series, Drama winner

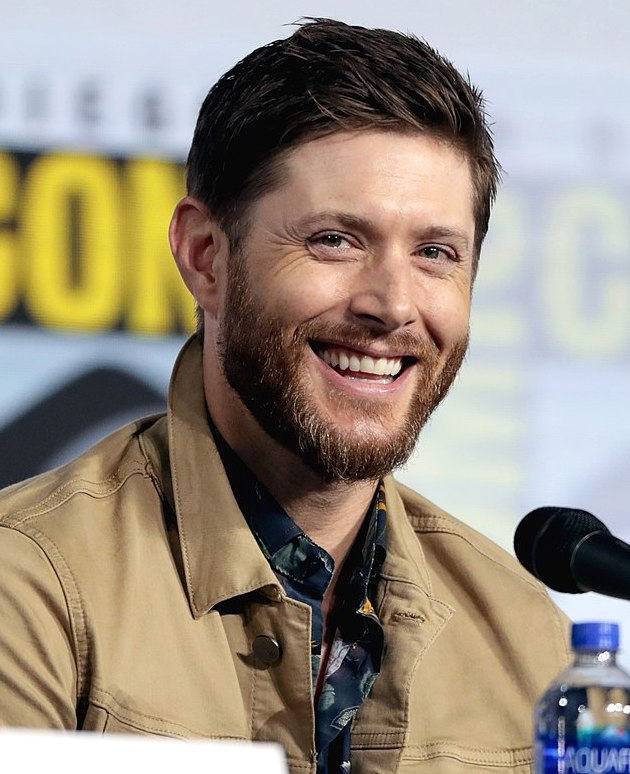
Jensen Ackles, Best Supporting Actor in a Streaming Series, Drama winner

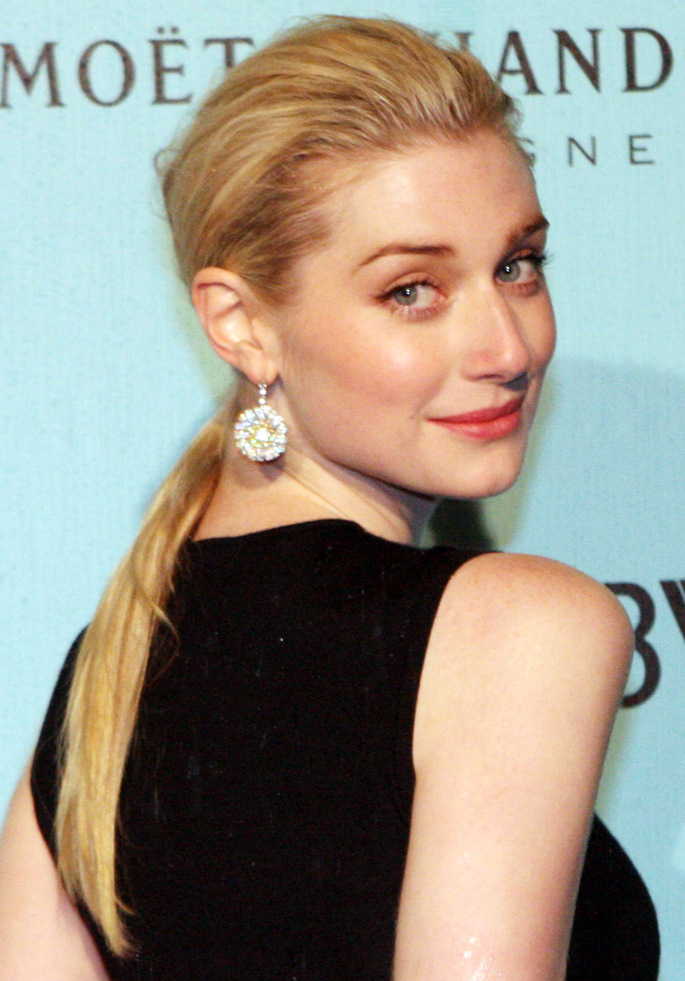
Elizabeth Debicki, Best Supporting Actress in a Streaming Series, Drama co-winner

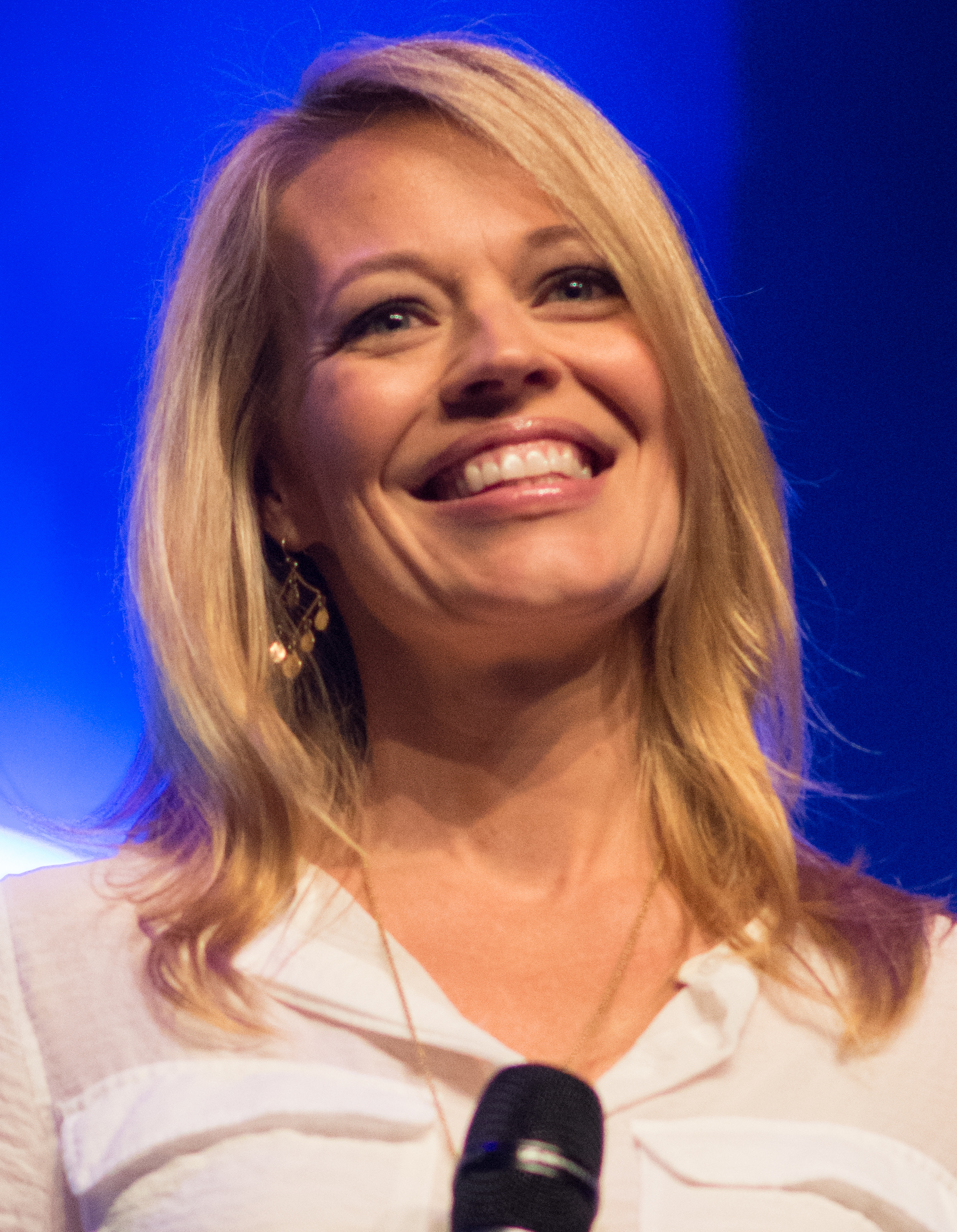
Jeri Ryan, Best Supporting Actress in a Streaming Series, Drama co-winner

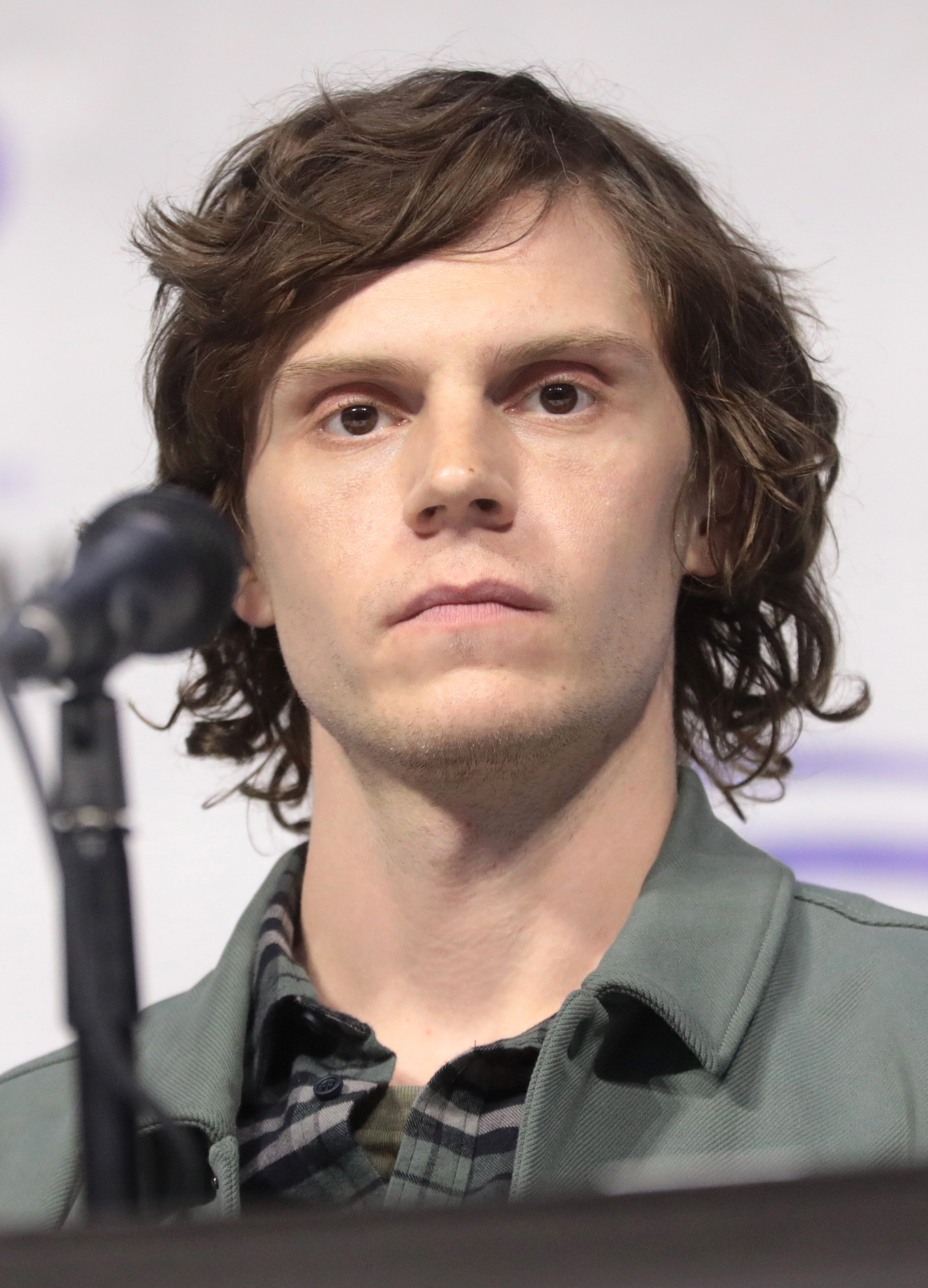
Evan Peters, Best Actor in a Streaming Limited or Anthology Series or Movie winner

Paul Walter Hauser, Best Supporting Actor in a Streaming Limited or Anthology Series or Movie winner

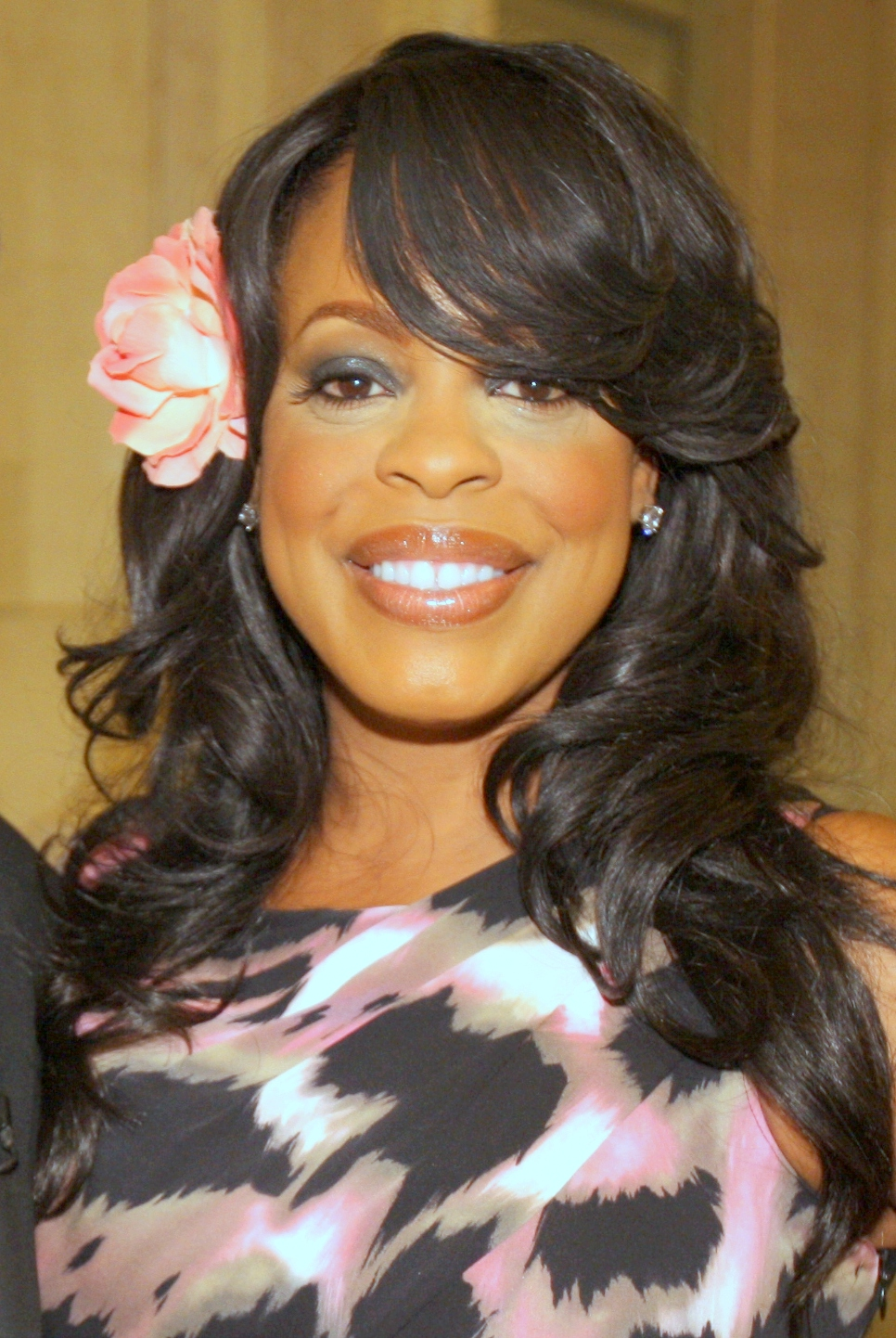
Niecy Nash-Betts, Best Supporting Actress in a Streaming Limited or Anthology Series or Movie winner

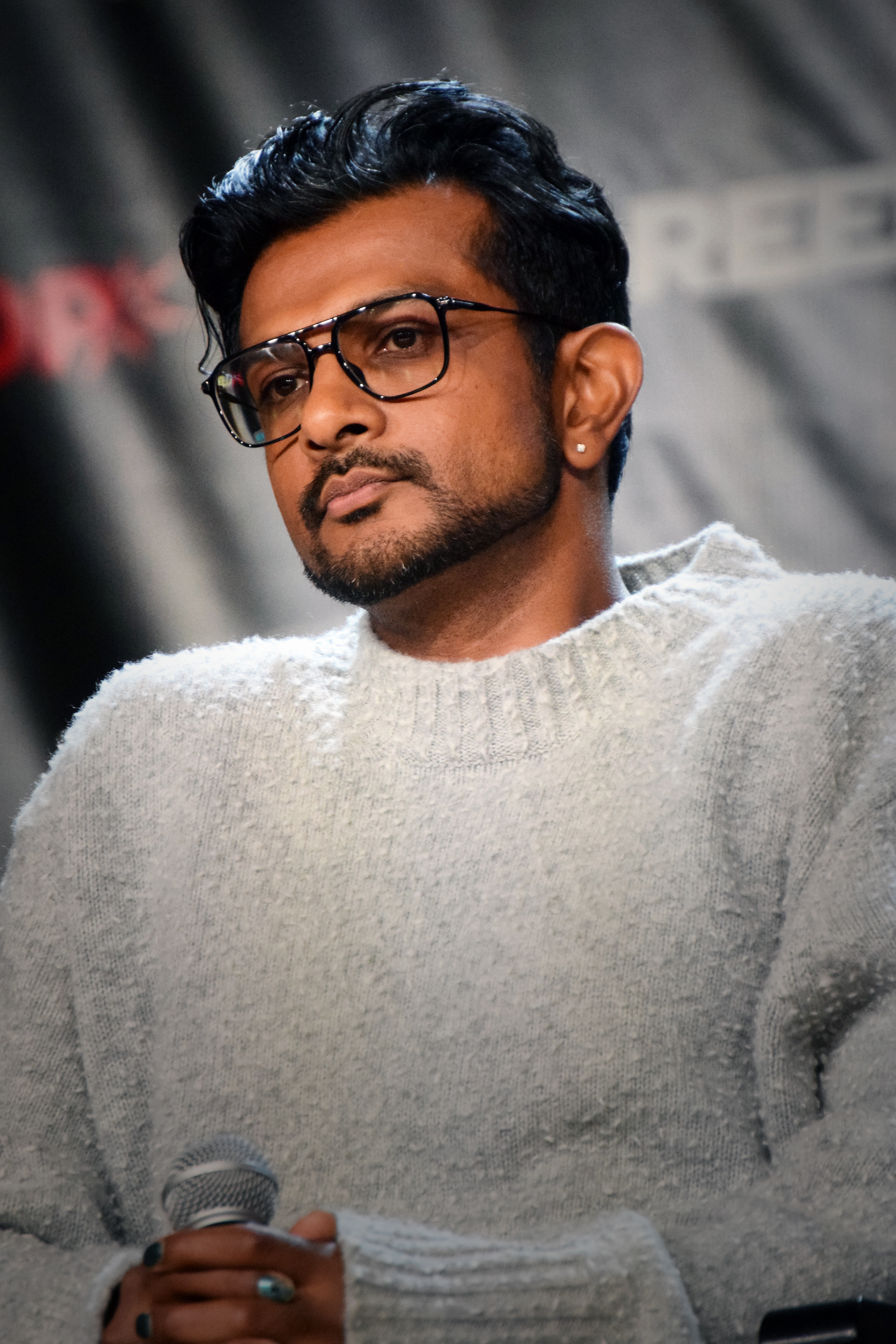
Utkarsh Ambudkar, Best Actor in a Broadcast Network or Cable Series, Comedy winner

Quinta Brunson, Best Actress in a Broadcast Network or Cable Series, Comedy winner

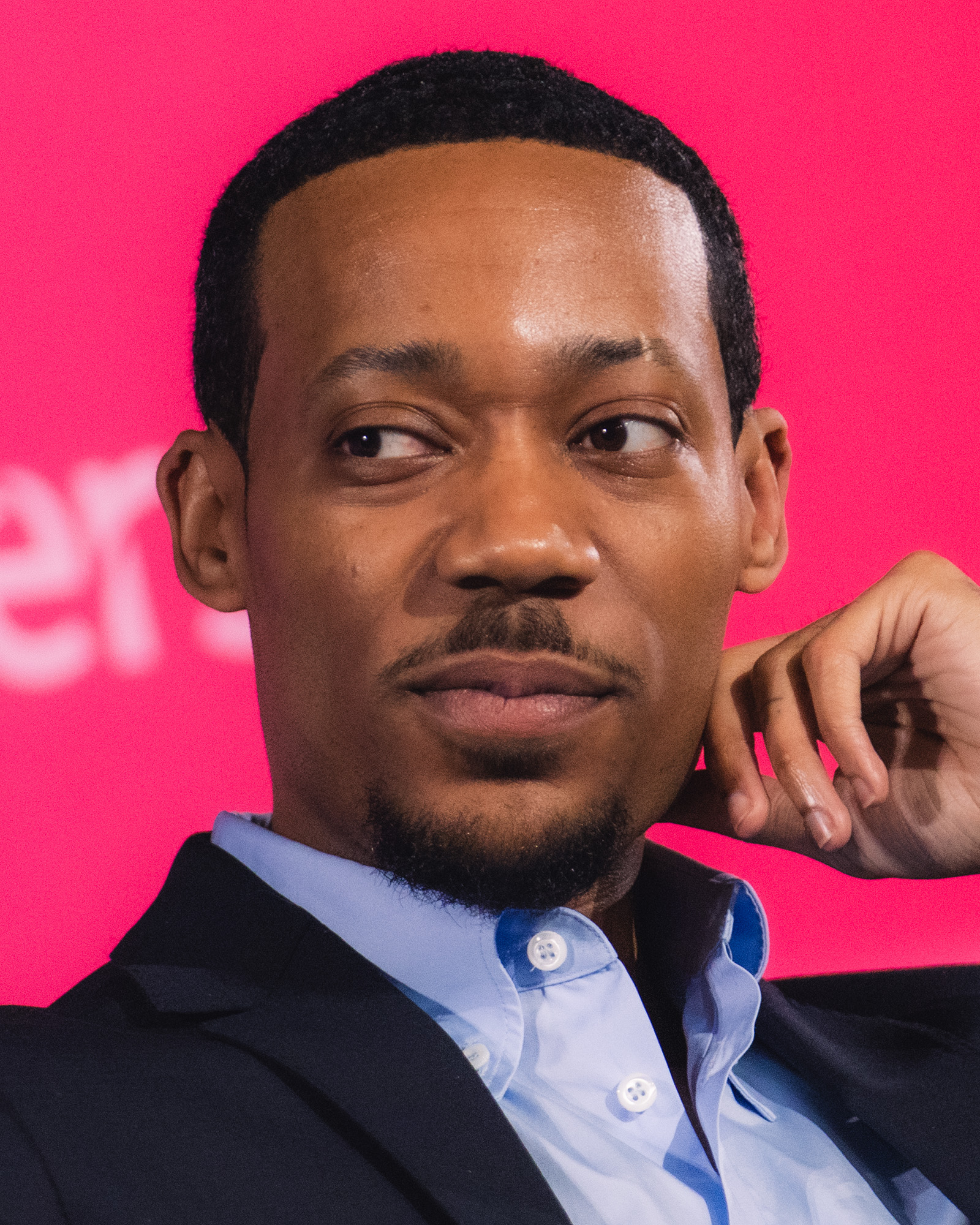
Tyler James Williams, Best Supporting Actor in a Broadcast Network or Cable Series, Comedy winner

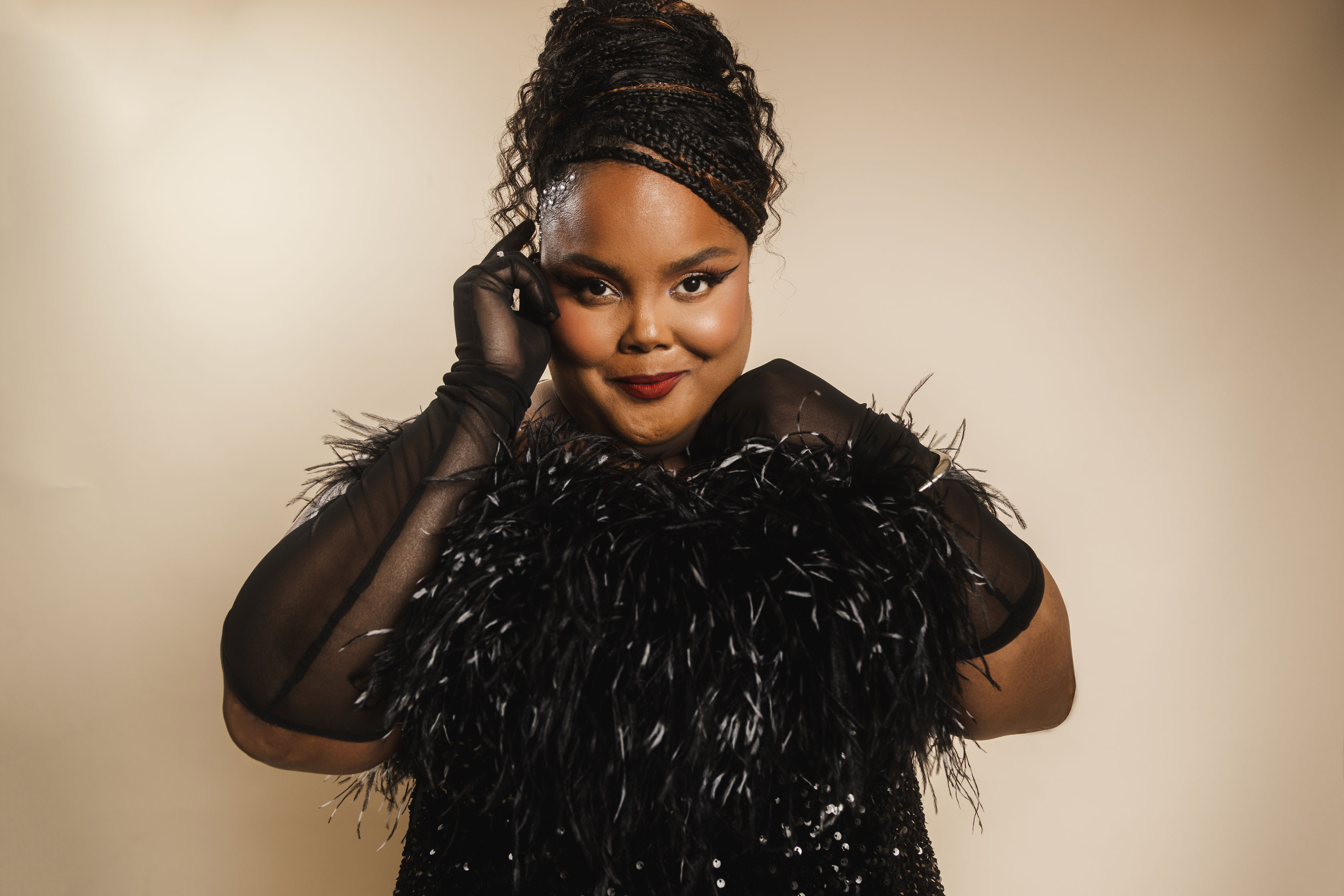
Danielle Pinnock, Best Supporting Actress in a Broadcast Network or Cable Series, Comedy winner

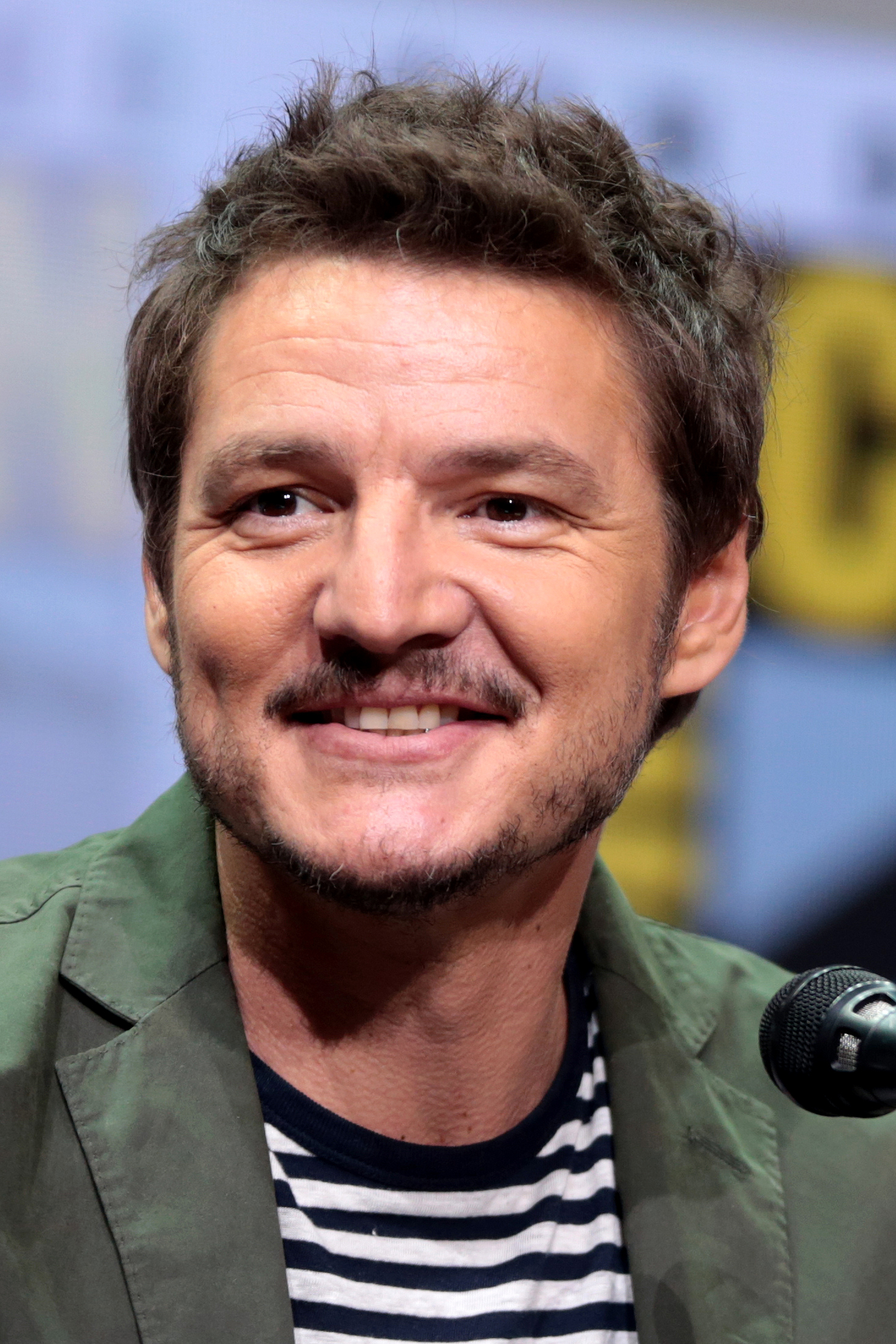
Pedro Pascal, Best Actor in a Broadcast Network or Cable Series, Drama winner

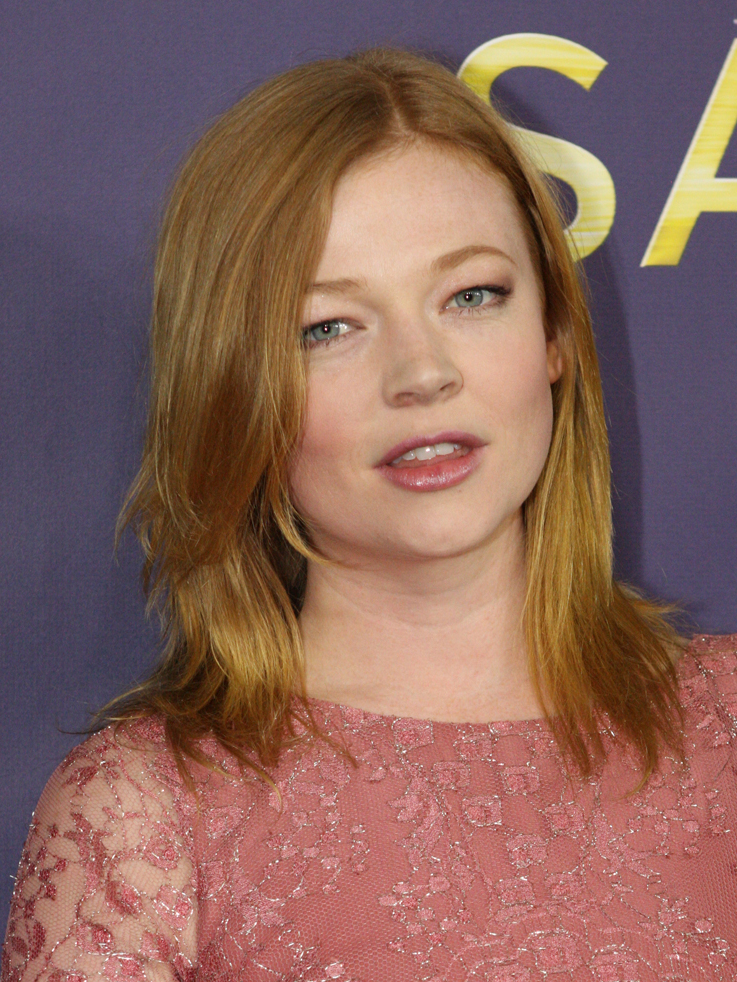
Sarah Snook, Best Actress in a Broadcast Network or Cable Series, Drama winner

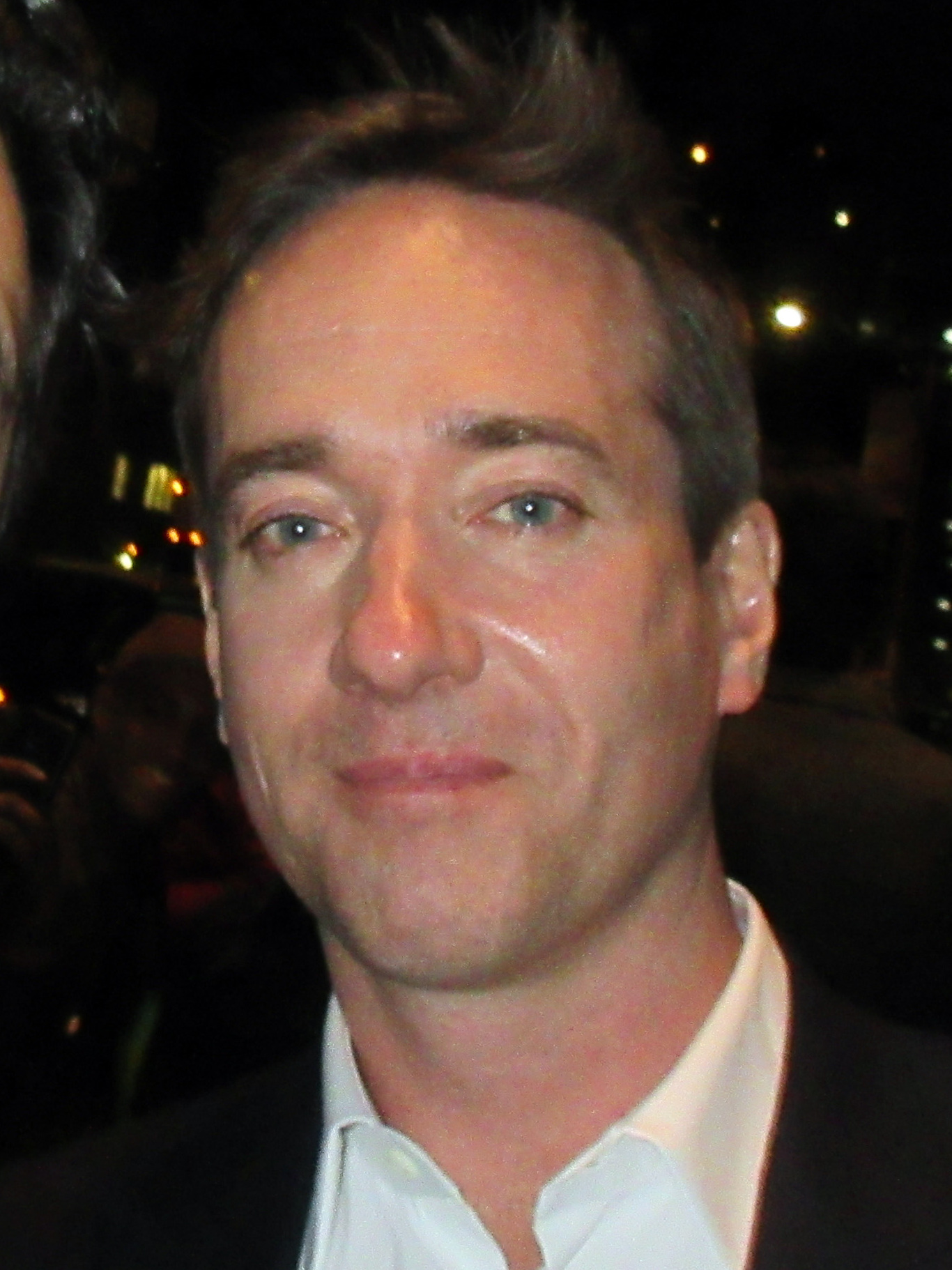
Matthew Macfadyen, Best Supporting Actor in a Broadcast Network or Cable Series, Drama winner

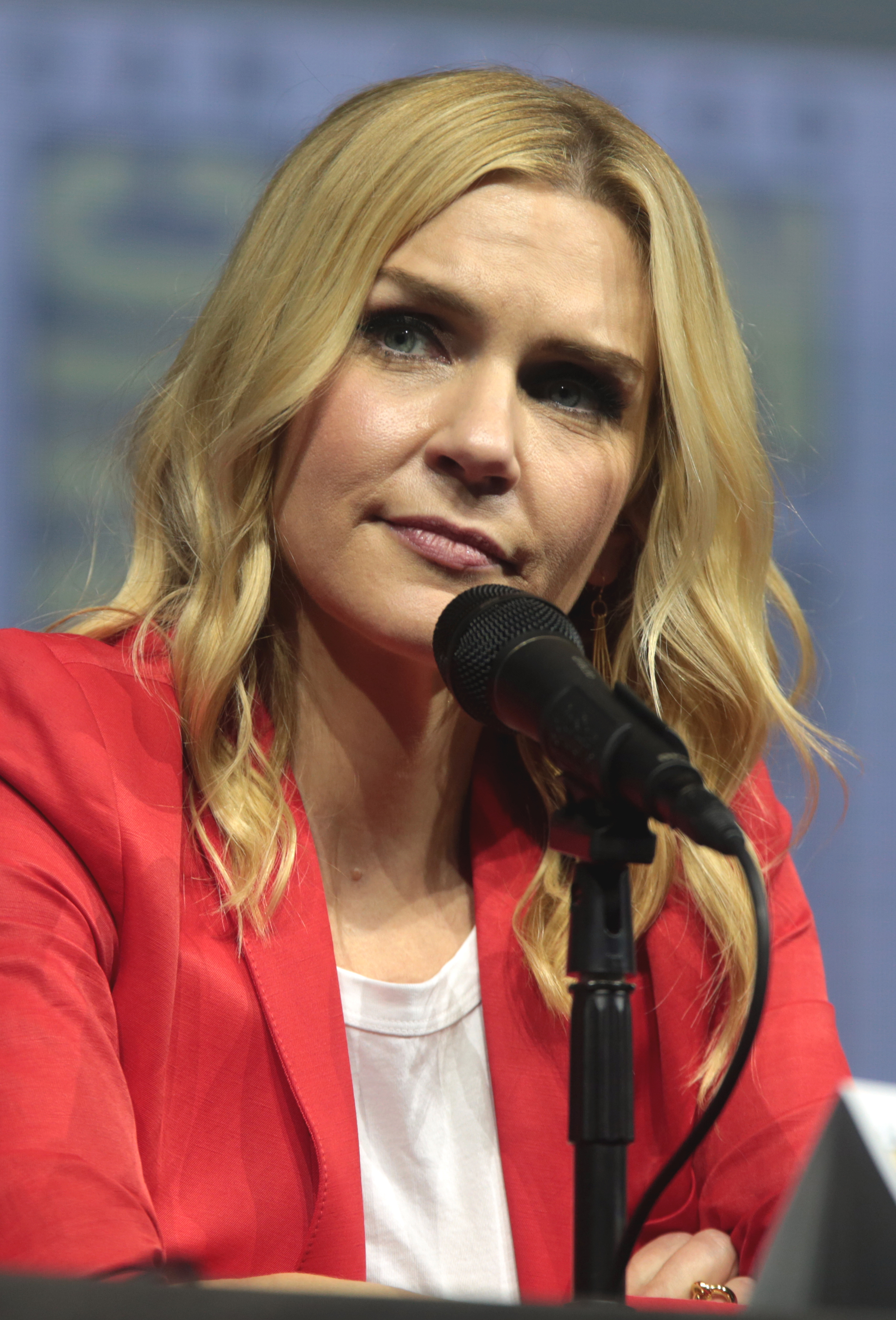
Rhea Seehorn, Best Supporting Actress in a Broadcast Network or Cable Series, Drama winner

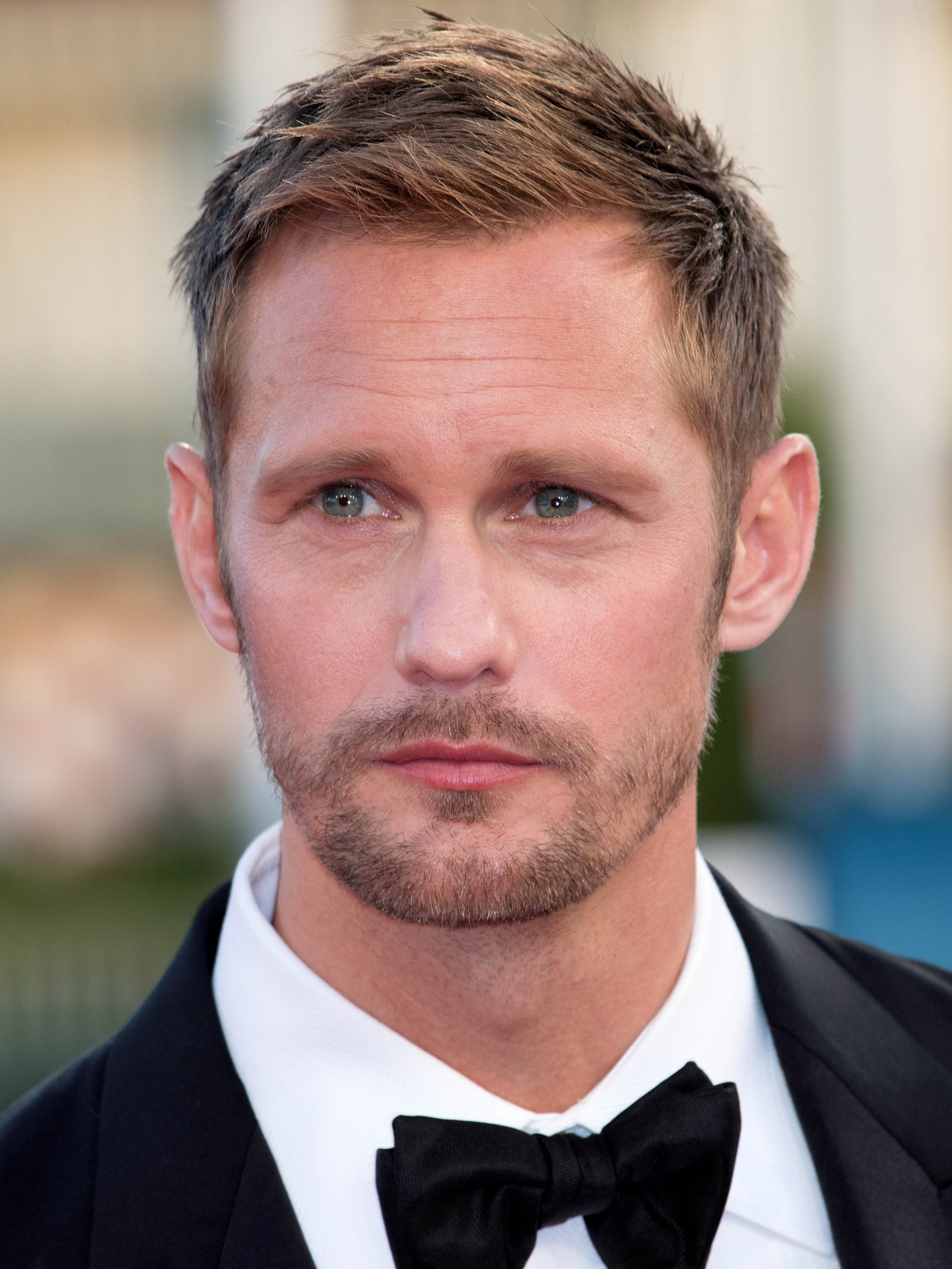
Alexander Skarsgård, Best Actor in a Broadcast Network or Cable Limited or Anthology Series co-winner

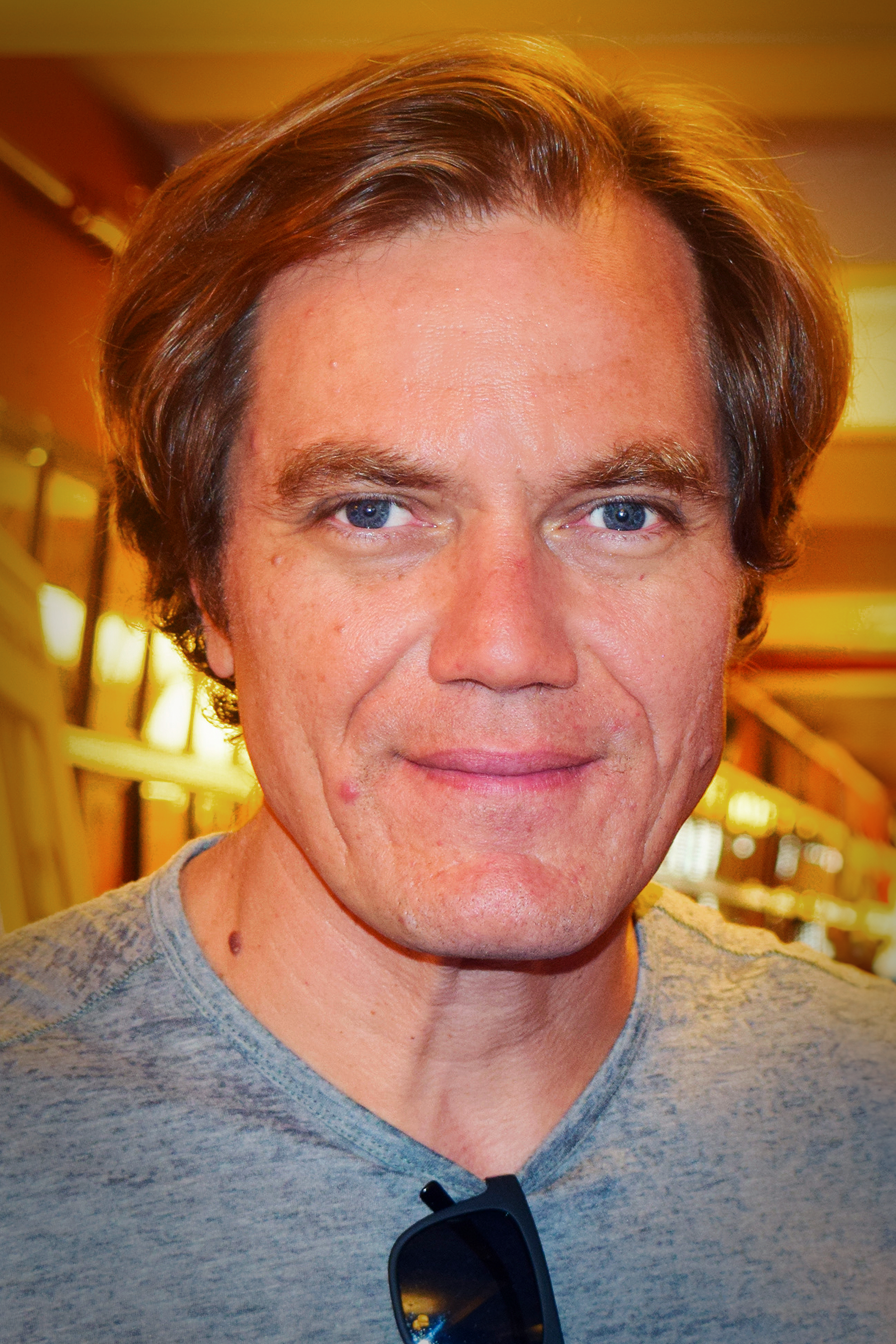
Michael Shannon, Best Actor in a Broadcast Network or Cable Limited or Anthology Series co-winner

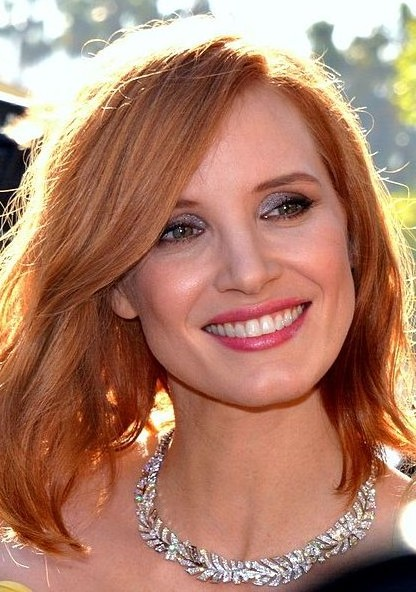
Jessica Chastain, Best Actress in a Broadcast Network or Cable Limited or Anthology Series winner

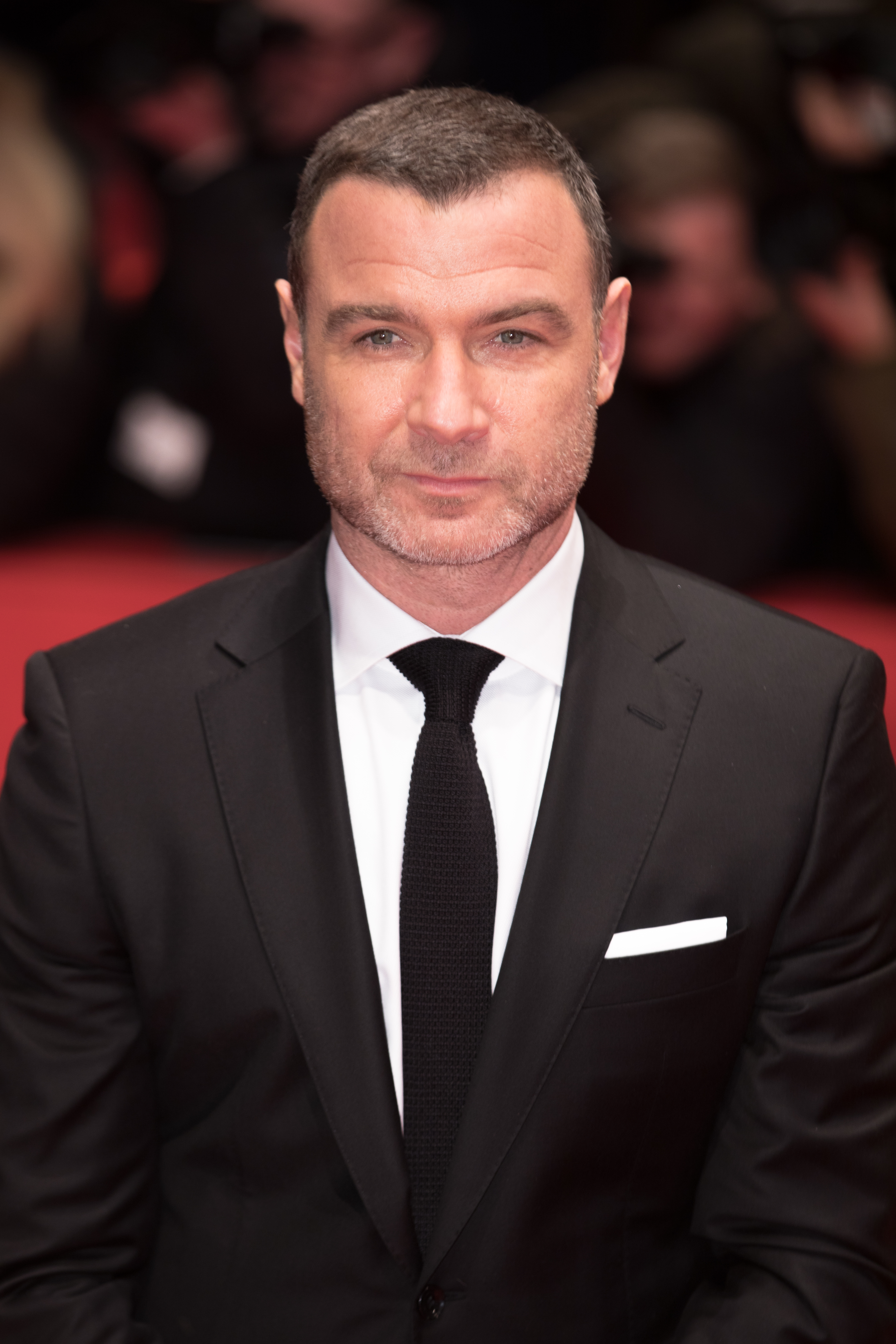
Liev Schreiber, Best Supporting Actor in a Broadcast Network or Cable Limited or Anthology Series winner

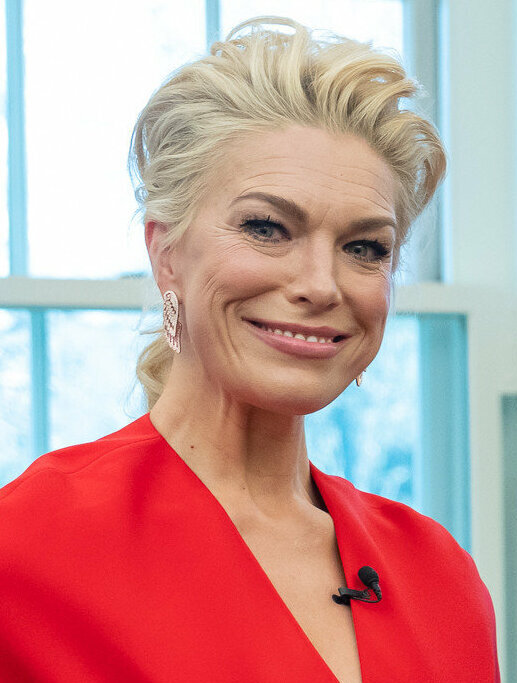
Hannah Waddingham, Best Supporting Actress in a Broadcast Network or Cable Limited or Anthology Series winner

Winners are listed first and highlighted with boldface.

=== Programs ===
==== Streaming ====
**Best Streaming Series, Comedy**: **The Marvelous Mrs. Maisel (Prime Video)**; Grease: Rise of the Pink Ladies (Paramount+); Jury Duty (Freevee); Only Murders in the Building (Hulu); Poker Face (Peacock); Shrinking (Apple TV+); Ted Lasso (Apple TV+); The Bear (FX on Hulu); Tulsa King (Paramount+); Wednesday (Netflix)	**Best Streaming Series, Drama**: **The Boys (Prime Video)**; 1923 (Paramount+); Andor (Disney+); Bad Sisters (Apple TV+); Queen Charlotte: A Bridgerton Story (Netflix); Star Trek: Picard (Paramount+); The Crown (Netflix); The Diplomat (Netflix); The Handmaid's Tale (Hulu); The Mandalorian (Disney+)
**Best Streaming Limited or Anthology Series**: **Beef (Netflix)**; Black Bird (Apple TV+); Dahmer – Monster: The Jeffrey Dahmer Story (Netflix); Daisy Jones & the Six (Prime Video); Fleishman Is in Trouble (FX on Hulu); Guillermo del Toro's Cabinet of Curiosities (Netflix); Mrs. Davis (Peacock); Ms. Marvel (Disney+); Tiny Beautiful Things (Hulu); Welcome to Chippendales (Hulu)	**Best Streaming Movie**: **Weird: The Al Yankovic Story (Roku)**; Boston Strangler (Hulu); Fire Island (Hulu); Hocus Pocus 2 (Disney+); Jerry & Marge Go Large (Paramount+); Not Okay (Hulu); Prey (Hulu); Reality (Max); Rosaline (Hulu); The People We Hate at the Wedding (Prime Video)

==== Broadcast Network / Cable ====
**Best Broadcast Network Series, Comedy**: **Abbott Elementary (ABC)**; Animal Control (Fox); Ghosts (CBS); Night Court (NBC); Not Dead Yet (ABC); The Goldbergs (ABC)	**Best Cable Series, Comedy**: **Party Down (Starz)**; Atlanta (FX); Barry (HBO); Blindspotting (Starz); Dave (FXX); What We Do in the Shadows (FX)
**Best Broadcast Network Series, Drama**: **Will Trent (ABC)**; 9-1-1 (Fox); Alaska Daily (ABC); Chicago Fire (NBC); Grey's Anatomy (ABC); Law & Order (NBC); Law & Order: Special Victims Unit (NBC); New Amsterdam (NBC); Quantum Leap (NBC); The Cleaning Lady (Fox)	**Best Cable Series, Drama**: **Succession (HBO)**; Anne Rice's Interview with the Vampire (AMC); Better Call Saul (AMC); From (MGM+); P-Valley (Starz); The Last of Us (HBO); The White Lotus (HBO); Yellowjackets (Showtime); Yellowstone (Paramount Network); Your Honor (Showtime)
**Best Broadcast Network or Cable Limited or Anthology Series**: **A Small Light (Nat Geo)**; Accused (Fox); Flowers in the Attic: The Origin (Lifetime); George & Tammy (Showtime)	**Best Broadcast Network or Cable Live-Action Television Movie**: **Black Girl Missing (Lifetime)**; Dolly Parton's Mountain Magic Christmas (NBC); Reno 9-1-1!: It's a Wonderful Heist (Comedy Central); The Portable Door (MGM+)

=== Acting ===
==== Streaming ====
**Best Actor in a Streaming Series, Comedy**: **Jeremy Allen White – The Bear as Carmen "Carmy" Berzatto (FX on Hulu)**; Jason Segel – Shrinking as Jimmy Laird (Apple TV+); Jason Sudeikis – Ted Lasso as Ted Lasso (Apple TV+); Keegan-Michael Key – Reboot as Reed Sterling (Hulu); Martin Short – Only Murders in the Building as Oliver Putnam (Hulu); Nicholas Hoult – The Great as Peter III of Russia (Hulu); Steve Martin – Only Murders in the Building as Charles-Haden Savage (Hulu); Sylvester Stallone – Tulsa King as Dwight "The General" Manfredi (Paramount+)	**Best Actress in a Streaming Series, Comedy**: **Rachel Brosnahan – The Marvelous Mrs. Maisel as Miriam "Midge" Maisel (Prime Video)**; Christina Applegate – Dead to Me as Jen Harding (Netflix); Jenna Ortega – Wednesday as Wednesday Addams (Netflix); Kim Fields – The Upshaws as Regina Upshaw (Netflix); Maya Rudolph – Loot as Molly Novak (Apple TV+); Natasha Lyonne – Poker Face as Charlie Cale (Peacock); Selena Gomez – Only Murders in the Building as Mabel Mora (Hulu); Tatiana Maslany – She-Hulk: Attorney at Law as Jennifer Walters / She-Hulk (Disney+)
**Best Supporting Actor in a Streaming Series, Comedy**: **James Marsden – Jury Duty as Himself (Freevee)**; Benjamin Bratt – Poker Face as Cliff LeGrand (Peacock); Brendan Hunt – Ted Lasso as Coach Beard (Apple TV+); Brett Goldstein – Ted Lasso as Roy Kent (Apple TV+); Ebon Moss-Bachrach – The Bear as Richard "Richie" Jerimovich (FX on Hulu); Harrison Ford – Shrinking as Dr. Paul Rhoades (Apple TV+); James Marsden – Dead to Me as Ben Wood (Netflix); Ke Huy Quan – American Born Chinese as Jamie Yao (Disney+); Phil Dunster – Ted Lasso as Jamie Tartt (Apple TV+); Tony Shalhoub – The Marvelous Mrs. Maisel as Abraham "Abe" Weissman (Prime Video)	**Best Supporting Actress in a Streaming Series, Comedy**: **Ayo Edebiri – The Bear as Sydney Adamu (FX on Hulu) (TIE)**; **Christina Ricci – Wednesday as Marilyn Thornhill / Laurel Gates (Netflix) (TIE)**; Alex Borstein – The Marvelous Mrs. Maisel as Susie Myerson (Prime Video); Ashley Park – Emily in Paris as Mindy Chen (Netflix); Diana Maria Riva – Dead to Me as Ana Perez (Netflix); Hannah Waddingham – Ted Lasso as Rebecca Welton (Apple TV+); Jessica Williams – Shrinking as Gaby (Apple TV+); Kristin Chenoweth – Schmigadoon! as Miss Codwell (Apple TV+); Rachel Bloom – Reboot as Hannah Korman (Hulu); Yeo Yann Yann – American Born Chinese as Christine Wang (Disney+)
**Best Actor in a Streaming Series, Drama**: **Antony Starr – The Boys as Homelander (Prime Video)**; Diego Luna – Andor as Cassian Andor (Disney+); Dominic West – The Crown as Charles, Prince of Wales; Harrison Ford – 1923 as Jacob Dutton (Paramount+); Jack Quaid – The Boys as Hughie Campbell (Prime Video); Logan Lerman – Hunters as Jonah Heidelbaum (Prime Video); Patrick Stewart – Star Trek: Picard as Jean-Luc Picard (Paramount+); Penn Badgley – You as Joe Goldberg (Netflix)	**Best Actress in a Streaming Series, Drama**: **Keri Russell – The Diplomat as Kate Wyler (Netflix)**; Elisabeth Moss – The Handmaid's Tale as June Osborne (Hulu); Erin Moriarty – The Boys as Annie January / Starlight (Prime Video); Helen Mirren – 1923 as Cara Dutton (Paramount+); India Amarteifio – Queen Charlotte: A Bridgerton Story as Queen Charlotte (Netflix); Karen Fukuhara – The Boys as Kimiko Miyashiro (Prime Video); Lizzy Caplan – Fatal Attraction as Alex Forrest (Paramount+); Sharon Horgan – Bad Sisters as Eva Garvey (Apple TV+)
**Best Supporting Actor in a Streaming Series, Drama**: **Jensen Ackles – The Boys as Soldier Boy (Prime Video)**; Bradley Whitford – The Handmaid's Tale as Commander Joseph Lawrence (Hulu); Brent Spiner – Star Trek: Picard as Data / Doctor Altan Inigo Soong (Paramount+); Chace Crawford – The Boys as The Deep (Prime Video); Edi Gathegi – For All Mankind as Dev Ayesa (Apple TV+); Ismael Cruz Córdova – The Lord of the Rings: The Rings of Power as Arondir (Prime Video); Jonathan Pryce – The Crown as Prince Philip, Duke of Edinburgh (Netflix); Max Minghella – The Handmaid's Tale as Commander Nick Blaine (Hulu); Rufus Sewell – The Diplomat as Hal Wyler (Netflix); Stellan Skarsgård – Andor as Luthen Rael (Disney+)	**Best Supporting Actress in a Streaming Series, Drama**: **Elizabeth Debicki – The Crown as Diana, Princess of Wales (Netflix) (TIE)**; **Jeri Ryan – Star Trek: Picard as Seven of Nine (Paramount+) (TIE)**; Ann Dowd – The Handmaid's Tale as Aunt Lydia Clements (Hulu); Anne-Marie Duff – Bad Sisters as Grace Williams (Apple TV+); Emily Swallow – The Mandalorian as The Armorer (Disney+); Eve Hewson – Bad Sisters as Becka Garvey (Apple TV+); Genevieve O'Reilly – Andor as Mon Mothma (Disney+); Lesley Manville – The Crown as Princess Margaret, Countess of Snowdon (Netflix); Sarah Desjardins – The Night Agent as Maddie Redfield (Netflix); Yvonne Strahovski – The Handmaid's Tale as Serena Joy Waterford (Hulu)
**Best Actor in a Streaming Limited or Anthology Series or Movie**: **Evan Peters – Dahmer – Monster: The Jeffrey Dahmer Story as Jeffrey Dahmer (Netflix)**; Daniel Radcliffe – Weird: The Al Yankovic Story as "Weird Al" Yankovic (Roku); Ewan McGregor – Obi-Wan Kenobi as Obi-Wan Kenobi (Disney+); Kumail Nanjiani – Welcome to Chippendales as Somen "Steve" Sonerjee (Hulu); Sam Claflin – Daisy Jones & the Six as Billy Dunne (Prime Video); Steve Carell – The Patient as Alan Strauss (FX on Hulu); Steven Yeun – Beef as Danny Cho (Netflix); Taron Egerton – Black Bird as James "Jimmy" Keene (Apple TV+)	**Best Actress in a Streaming Limited or Anthology Series or Movie**: **Ali Wong – Beef as Amy Lau (Netflix)**; Amber Midthunder – Prey as Naru (Hulu); Dominique Fishback – Swarm as Andrea "Dre" Greene (Prime Video); Iman Vellani – Ms. Marvel as Kamala Khan / Ms. Marvel (Disney+); Kathryn Hahn – Tiny Beautiful Things as Clare Pierce (Hulu); Rachel Weisz – Dead Ringers as Beverly and Elliot Mantle (Prime Video); Riley Keough – Daisy Jones & the Six as Daisy Jones (Prime Video); Vera Farmiga – Five Days at Memorial as Dr. Anna Pou (Apple TV+)
**Best Supporting Actor in a Streaming Limited or Anthology Series or Movie**: **Paul Walter Hauser – Black Bird as Larry Hall (Apple TV+)**; Domhnall Gleeson – The Patient as Sam Fortner (FX on Hulu); Kieran Tamondong – Dahmer – Monster: The Jeffrey Dahmer Story as Konerak Sinthasomphone (Netflix); Murray Bartlett – Welcome to Chippendales as Nick De Noia (Hulu); Nikolaj Coster-Waldau – The Last Thing He Told Me as Owen Michaels / Ethan (Apple TV+); Rainn Wilson – Weird: The Al Yankovic Story as Dr. Demento (Roku); Ray Liotta – Black Bird as James "Big Jim" Keene (Apple TV+); Richard Jenkins – Dahmer – Monster: The Jeffrey Dahmer Story as Lionel Dahmer (Netflix); Timothy Olyphant – Daisy Jones & the Six as Rod Reyes (Prime Video); Young Mazino – Beef as Paul Cho (Netflix)	**Best Supporting Actress in a Streaming Limited or Anthology Series or Movie**: **Niecy Nash-Betts – Dahmer – Monster: The Jeffrey Dahmer Story as Glenda Cleveland (Netflix)**; Anjali Bhimani – Ms. Marvel as Aunt Ruby (Disney+); Annaleigh Ashford – Welcome to Chippendales as Irene Banerjee (Hulu); Ashley Park – Beef as Naomi (Netflix); Camila Morrone – Daisy Jones & the Six as Camila Alvarez (Prime Video); Claire Danes – Fleishman Is in Trouble as Rachel Fleishman (FX on Hulu); Evan Rachel Wood – Weird: The Al Yankovic Story as Madonna (Roku); Julie Ann Emery – Five Days at Memorial as Diane Robichaux (Apple TV+); Maria Bello – Beef as Jordan (Netflix); Sarah Pidgeon – Tiny Beautiful Things as Younger Clare (Hulu)

==== Broadcast Network / Cable ====
**Best Actor in a Broadcast Network or Cable Series, Comedy**: **Utkarsh Ambudkar – Ghosts as Jay Arondekar (CBS)**; Adam Scott – Party Down as Henry Pollard (Starz); Alan Tudyk – Resident Alien as Harry Vanderspeigle (Syfy); Bill Hader – Barry as Barry Berkman (HBO); Bob Odenkirk – Lucky Hank as William Henry "Hank" Devereaux, Jr. (AMC); Joel McHale – Animal Control as Frank Shaw (Fox); John Goodman – The Conners as Dan Conner (ABC); John Larroquette – Night Court as Dan Fielding (NBC)	**Best Actress in a Broadcast Network or Cable Series, Comedy**: **Quinta Brunson – Abbott Elementary as Janine Teagues (ABC)**; Gina Rodriguez – Not Dead Yet as Nell Serrano (ABC); Jasmine Cephas Jones – Blindspotting as Ashley Rose (Starz); Marcia Gay Harden – So Help Me Todd as Margaret (CBS); Natasia Demetriou – What We Do in the Shadows as Nadja of Antipaxos (FX); Robin Thede – A Black Lady Sketch Show as Various Characters (HBO); Rose McIver – Ghosts as Samantha "Sam" Arondekar (CBS); Sofia Black-D'Elia – Single Drunk Female as Samantha Fink (Freeform)
**Best Supporting Actor in a Broadcast Network or Cable Series, Comedy**: **Tyler James Williams – Abbott Elementary as Gregory Eddie (ABC)**; Brandon Scott Jones – Ghosts as Captain Isaac Higgintoot (CBS); Brian Tyree Henry – Atlanta as Alfred "Paper Boi" Miles (FX); Harvey Guillén – What We Do in the Shadows as Guillermo de la Cruz (FX); Henry Winkler – Barry as Gene Cousineau (HBO); Ken Marino – Party Down as Ronald Wayne "Ron" Donald (Starz); Leslie Jordan – Call Me Kat as Phil (Fox) (posthumous); Martin Starr – Party Down as Roman DeBeers (Starz); Ryan Hansen – Party Down as Kyle Bradway (Starz); William Stanford Davis – Abbott Elementary as Mr. Johnson (ABC)	**Best Supporting Actress in a Broadcast Network or Cable Series, Comedy**: **Danielle Pinnock – Ghosts as Alberta Haynes (CBS)**; Janelle James – Abbott Elementary as Ava Coleman (ABC); Jane Lynch – Party Down as Constance Carmell (Starz); Jennifer Garner – Party Down as Evie Adler (Starz); Lisa Ann Walter – Abbott Elementary as Melissa Schemmenti (ABC); Megan Mullally – Party Down as Lydia Dunfree (Starz); Rebecca Wisocky – Ghosts as Henrietta "Hetty" Woodstone (CBS); Sarah Goldberg – Barry as Sally Reed (HBO); Sheryl Lee Ralph – Abbott Elementary as Barbara Howard (ABC); Zazie Beetz – Atlanta as Van Keefer (FX)
**Best Actor in a Broadcast Network or Cable Series, Drama**: **Pedro Pascal – The Last of Us as Joel Miller (HBO)**; Bob Odenkirk – Better Call Saul as Jimmy McGill / Saul Goodman / Gene Takavic (AMC); Harold Perrineau – From as Boyd Stevens (MGM+); Kevin Costner – Yellowstone as John Dutton III (Paramount Network); Kieran Culkin – Succession as Roman Roy (HBO); Milo Ventimiglia – The Company You Keep as Charlie Nicoletti (ABC); Ramón Rodríguez – Will Trent as Will Trent (ABC); Raymond Lee – Quantum Leap as Ben Song (NBC)	**Best Actress in a Broadcast Network or Cable Series, Drama**: **Sarah Snook – Succession as Siobhan "Shiv" Roy (HBO)**; Angela Bassett – 9-1-1 as Athena Grant-Nash (Fox); Bella Ramsey – The Last of Us as Ellie (HBO); Emma D'Arcy – House of the Dragon as Princess / Queen Rhaenyra Targaryen (HBO); Erika Christensen – Will Trent as Angie Polaski (ABC); Juliette Lewis – Yellowjackets as Natalie "Nat" Scatorccio (Showtime); Kelly Reilly – Yellowstone as Bethany "Beth" Dutton (Paramount Network); Melanie Lynskey – Yellowjackets as Shauna Shipman (Showtime)
**Best Supporting Actor in a Broadcast Network or Cable Series, Drama**: **Matthew Macfadyen – Succession as Tom Wambsgans (HBO)**; Alexander Skarsgård – Succession as Lukas Matsson (HBO); Cole Hauser – Yellowstone as Rip Wheeler (Paramount Network); Elijah Wood – Yellowjackets as Walter Tattersall (Showtime); Jeremy Sisto – FBI as Jubal Valentine (CBS); Jonathan Banks – Better Call Saul as Mike Ehrmantraut (AMC); Luke Grimes – Yellowstone as Kayce Dutton (Paramount Network); Matt Smith – House of the Dragon as Prince Daemon Targaryen (HBO); Theo James – The White Lotus as Cameron Sullivan (HBO); Wes Bentley – Yellowstone as James Michael "Jamie" Dutton (Paramount Network)	**Best Supporting Actress in a Broadcast Network or Cable Series, Drama**: **Rhea Seehorn – Better Call Saul as Kim Wexler (AMC)**; Aubrey Plaza – The White Lotus as Harper Spiller (HBO); Catalina Sandino Moreno – From as Tabitha Matthews (MGM+); Christina Ricci – Yellowjackets as Misty Quigley (Showtime); Janet Montgomery – New Amsterdam as Dr. Lauren Bloom (NBC); Jennifer Coolidge – The White Lotus as Tanya McQuoid-Hunt (HBO); Jen Tullock – Perry Mason as Anita St. Pierre (HBO); Lauren Ambrose – Yellowjackets as Vanessa "Van" Palmer (Showtime); Sonja Sohn – Will Trent as Amanda Wagner (ABC); Sophie Thatcher – Yellowjackets as Teen Natalie "Nat" Scatorccio (Showtime)
**Best Actor in a Broadcast Network or Cable Limited or Anthology Series**: **Alexander Skarsgård – Documentary Now! as Rainer Wolz (IFC) (TIE)**; **Michael Shannon – George & Tammy as George Jones (Showtime) (TIE)**; Josh Groban – Beauty and the Beast: A 30th Celebration as Beast (ABC); Woody Harrelson – White House Plumbers as E. Howard Hunt (HBO)	**Best Actress in a Broadcast Network or Cable Limited or Anthology Series**: **Jessica Chastain – George & Tammy as Tammy Wynette (Showtime)**; Bel Powley – A Small Light as Miep Gies (Nat Geo); Cate Blanchett – Documentary Now! as Alice (IFC); H.E.R. – Beauty and the Beast: A 30th Celebration as Belle (ABC)
**Best Supporting Actor in a Broadcast Network or Cable Limited or Anthology Series**: **Liev Schreiber – A Small Light as Otto Frank (Nat Geo)**; Guy Pearce – A Spy Among Friends as Kim Philby (MGM+); Justin Theroux – White House Plumbers as G. Gordon Liddy (HBO); Wendell Pierce – Accused as Detective Trent Douglas (Fox)	**Best Supporting Actress in a Broadcast Network or Cable Limited or Anthology Series**: **Hannah Waddingham – Tom Jones: Masterpiece as Lady Bellaston (PBS)**; Judy Greer – White House Plumbers as Fran Liddy (HBO); Kathleen Turner – White House Plumbers as Dita Beard (HBO); Lena Headey – White House Plumbers as Dorothy Hunt (HBO)

=== Directing ===
==== Streaming ====
**Best Directing in a Streaming Series, Comedy**: **Unprisoned – Numa Perrier: "Nigrescence" (Hulu)**; Only Murders in the Building – Jamie Babbit: "I Know Who Did It" (Hulu); Poker Face – Rian Johnson: "Escape from Shit Mountain" (Peacock); Shrinking – James Ponsoldt: "Coin Flip" (Apple TV+); Ted Lasso – Declan Lowney: "So Long, Farewell" (Apple TV+); The Bear – Christopher Storer: "Review" (FX on Hulu); The Marvelous Mrs. Maisel – Amy Sherman-Palladino: "Four Minutes" (Prime Video); Wednesday – Tim Burton: "Wednesday's Child is Full of Woe" (Netflix)	**Best Directing in a Streaming Series, Drama**: **The Boys – Nelson Cragg: "Herogasm" (Prime Video)**; 1923 – Ben Richardson: "1923" (Paramount+); Andor – Benjamin Caron: "Rix Road" (Disney+); Star Trek: Picard – Terry Matalas: "The Last Generation" (Paramount+); The Diplomat – Alex Graves: "The James Bond Clause" (Netflix); The Mandalorian – Lee Isaac Chung: "Chapter 19: The Convert" (Disney+)
**Best Directing in a Streaming Limited or Anthology Series or Movie**: **Beef – Lee Sung Jin: "Figures of Light" (Netflix)**; Black Bird – Michaël R. Roskam: "Pilot" (Apple TV+); Dahmer – Monster: The Jeffrey Dahmer Story – Paris Barclay: "God of Forgiveness, God of Vengeance" (Netflix); Prey – Dan Trachtenberg (Hulu); Tiny Beautiful Things – Rachel Lee Goldenberg: "Pilot" (Hulu); Weird: The Al Yankovic Story – Eric Appel (Roku)

==== Broadcast Network / Cable ====
**Best Directing in a Broadcast Network or Cable Series, Comedy**: **Party Down – Ken Marino: "KSGY-95 Prizewinner's Luau" (Starz)**; Abbott Elementary – Randall Einhorn: "Teacher's Conference" (ABC); Barry – Bill Hader: "wow" (HBO); Blindspotting – Rafael Casal: "The Good, the Bad, and the Thizzly" (Starz); Ghosts – Christine Gernon: "Whodunnit" (CBS); What We Do in the Shadows – Kyle Newacheck: "Private School" (FX)	**Best Directing in a Broadcast Network or Cable Series, Drama**: **Succession – Mark Mylod: "Connor's Wedding" (HBO)**; From – Jack Bender: "Pas de Deux" (MGM+); Queen Sugar – Ava DuVernay: "For They Existed" (OWN); The Cleaning Lady – Timothy Busfield: "Sanctuary" (Fox); The Company You Keep – Jon Huertas: "The Spy Who Loved Me" (ABC); Will Trent – Howard Deutch: "Bill Black" (ABC); Yellowjackets – Ben Semanoff: "Edible Complex" (Showtime); Yellowjackets – Karyn Kusama: "Storytelling" (Showtime)
**Best Directing in a Broadcast Network or Cable Limited or Anthology Series**: **A Small Light – Susanna Fogel: "Pilot" (Nat Geo)**; A Spy Among Friends – Nick Murphy: "Snow" (MGM+); Documentary Now! – Alex Buono and Rhys Thomas: "Soldier of Illusion, Part 1" (IFC); White House Plumbers – David Mandel (HBO)

=== Writing ===
==== Streaming ====
**Best Writing in a Streaming Series, Comedy**: **The Bear – Christopher Storer: "System" (FX on Hulu)**; Only Murders in the Building – John Hoffman, Matteo Borghese, and Rob Turbovsky: "I Know Who Did It" (Hulu); Poker Face – Rian Johnson: "Dead Man's Hand" (Peacock); Shrinking – Bill Lawrence, Jason Segel, and Brett Goldstein: "Coin Flip" (Apple TV+); The Coroner's Assistant – Angeline Walsh: "The Interview" (YouTube); The Great – Tony McNamara: "Choose Your Weapon" (Hulu); The Marvelous Mrs. Maisel – Amy Sherman-Palladino and Daniel Palladino: "Four Minutes" (Prime Video); Wednesday – Alfred Gough and Miles Millar: "Wednesday's Child is Full of Woe" (Netflix)	**Best Writing in a Streaming Series, Drama**: **Star Trek: Picard – Terry Matalas: "The Last Generation" (Paramount+)**; 1923 – Taylor Sheridan: "1923" (Paramount+); Andor – Tony Gilroy: "Rix Road" (Disney+); Bel-Air – Carla Banks Waddles and Daniela Gaj: "Don't Look Back" (Peacock); The Boys – Logan Ritchey and David Reed: "The Instant White-Hot Wild" (Prime Video); The Crown – Peter Morgan: "Gunpowder" (Netflix)
**Best Writing in a Streaming Limited or Anthology Series or Movie**: **Weird: The Al Yankovic Story – Al Yankovic and Eric Appel (Roku)**; Beef – Lee Sung Jin: "The Birds Don't Sing, They Screech in Pain" (Netflix); Black Bird – Dennis Lehane and Steve Harris: "WhatsHerName" (Apple TV+); Fleishman Is in Trouble – Taffy Brodesser-Akner: "Me-Time" (FX on Hulu); The Patient – Joel Fields and Joe Weisberg (FX on Hulu); Tiny Beautiful Things – Liz Tigelaar: "Pilot" (Hulu)

==== Broadcast Network / Cable ====
**Best Writing in a Broadcast Network or Cable Series, Comedy**: **What We Do in the Shadows – Ayo Edebiri and Shana Gohd: "Private School" (FX)**; Abbott Elementary – Quinta Brunson: "Development Day" (ABC); Barry – Bill Hader: "wow" (HBO); Ghosts – Joe Port and Joe Wiseman: "Whodunnit "(CBS); Not Dead Yet – Casey Johnson and David Windsor: "Pilot" (ABC); Party Down – John Enbom: "Once Upon a Time 'Proms Away' Prom-otional Event" (Starz)	**Best Writing in a Broadcast Network or Cable Series, Drama**: **Succession – Jesse Armstrong: "Connor's Wedding" (HBO)**; A Million Little Things – DJ Nash and James Roday Rodriguez: "One Big Thing" (ABC); Quantum Leap – Shakina: "Let Them Play" (NBC); The White Lotus – Mike White: "Arrivederci" (HBO); Will Trent – Liz Heldens and Kath Lingenfelter: "A Bad Temper and a Hard Heart" (ABC); Yellowjackets – Jonathan Lisco: "Edible Complex" (Showtime); Yellowjackets – Liz Phang and Rich Monahan: "Burial" (Showtime); Yellowstone – Taylor Sheridan: "Horses in Heaven" (Paramount Network)
**Best Writing in a Broadcast Network or Cable Limited or Anthology Series**: **Documentary Now! – John Mulaney: "Soldier of Illusion, Part 1" (IFC)**; Accused – Howard Gordon: "Scott's Story" (Fox); A Small Light – Joan Rater and Tony Phelan: "Pilot" (Nat Geo); A Spy Among Friends – Alexander Cary: "Boom-ooh-yatatatah" (MGM+)

== Honorary Awards ==
- TV Icon Award – Eric Kripke
- Artisan Spotlight Award – Ariel Marx

== Most wins ==
Wins by series
Wins	Series
5	Succession
4	The Boys
3	Abbott Elementary
3	The Bear
3	Beef
3	A Small Light
2	Dahmer – Monster: The Jeffrey Dahmer Story
2	Documentary Now!
2	George & Tammy
2	Ghosts
2	The Marvelous Mrs. Maisel
2	Party Down
2	Star Trek: Picard
2	Weird: The Al Yankovic Story

Wins by network/platform
Wins	Network/Platform
8	Netflix
6	HBO
6	Prime Video
4	ABC
3	FX on Hulu
3	Nat Geo
2	CBS
2	IFC
2	Paramount+
2	Roku
2	Showtime
2	Starz

== Most nominations ==
Nominations by series
Nominations	Series
11	Yellowjackets
10	Party Down
9	Abbott Elementary
9	The Boys
8	Beef
8	Ghosts
7	Succession
7	Ted Lasso
7	Yellowstone
6	Andor
6	Barry
6	The Bear
6	Black Bird
6	The Crown
6	Dahmer – Monster: The Jeffrey Dahmer Story
6	The Handmaid's Tale
6	The Marvelous Mrs. Maisel
6	Only Murders in the Building
6	Shrinking
6	Star Trek: Picard
6	Weird: The Al Yankovic Story
6	White House Plumbers
6	Will Trent
5	1923
5	Daisy Jones & the Six
5	Poker Face
5	A Small Light
5	Tiny Beautiful Things
5	Wednesday
5	What We Do in the Shadows
5	The White Lotus
4	Bad Sisters
4	Better Call Saul
4	The Diplomat
4	Documentary Now!
4	From
4	Welcome to Chippendales
3	Accused
3	Atlanta
3	Blindspotting
3	Dead to Me
3	Fleishman Is in Trouble
3	George & Tammy
3	The Last of Us
3	The Mandalorian
3	Ms. Marvel
3	Not Dead Yet
3	The Patient
3	Prey
3	Quantum Leap
3	A Spy Among Friends
2	9-1-1
2	American Born Chinese
2	Animal Control
2	Beauty and the Beast: A 30th Celebration
2	The Cleaning Lady
2	The Company You Keep
2	Five Days at Memorial
2	The Great
2	House of the Dragon
2	Jury Duty
2	New Amsterdam
2	Night Court
2	Queen Charlotte: A Bridgerton Story
2	Reboot
2	Tulsa King

Nominations by network/platform
Nominations	Network/Platform
39	Netflix
33	Hulu
31	HBO
29	Apple TV+
27	ABC
25	Prime Video
17	Disney+
16	Paramount+
15	Showtime
14	Starz
12	FX on Hulu
11	NBC
10	CBS
10	Fox
8	FX
8	MGM+
7	Paramount Network
7	Peacock
6	AMC
6	Roku
5	Nat Geo
4	IFC
2	Freevee
2	Lifetime

== See also ==
- 7th Astra Film Awards
- 1st Astra Creative Arts TV Awards
- 2nd Astra Film Creative Arts Awards
- 6th Hollywood Critics Association Midseason Film Awards
