= Alex Paez =

American actor, musician and former restaurateur

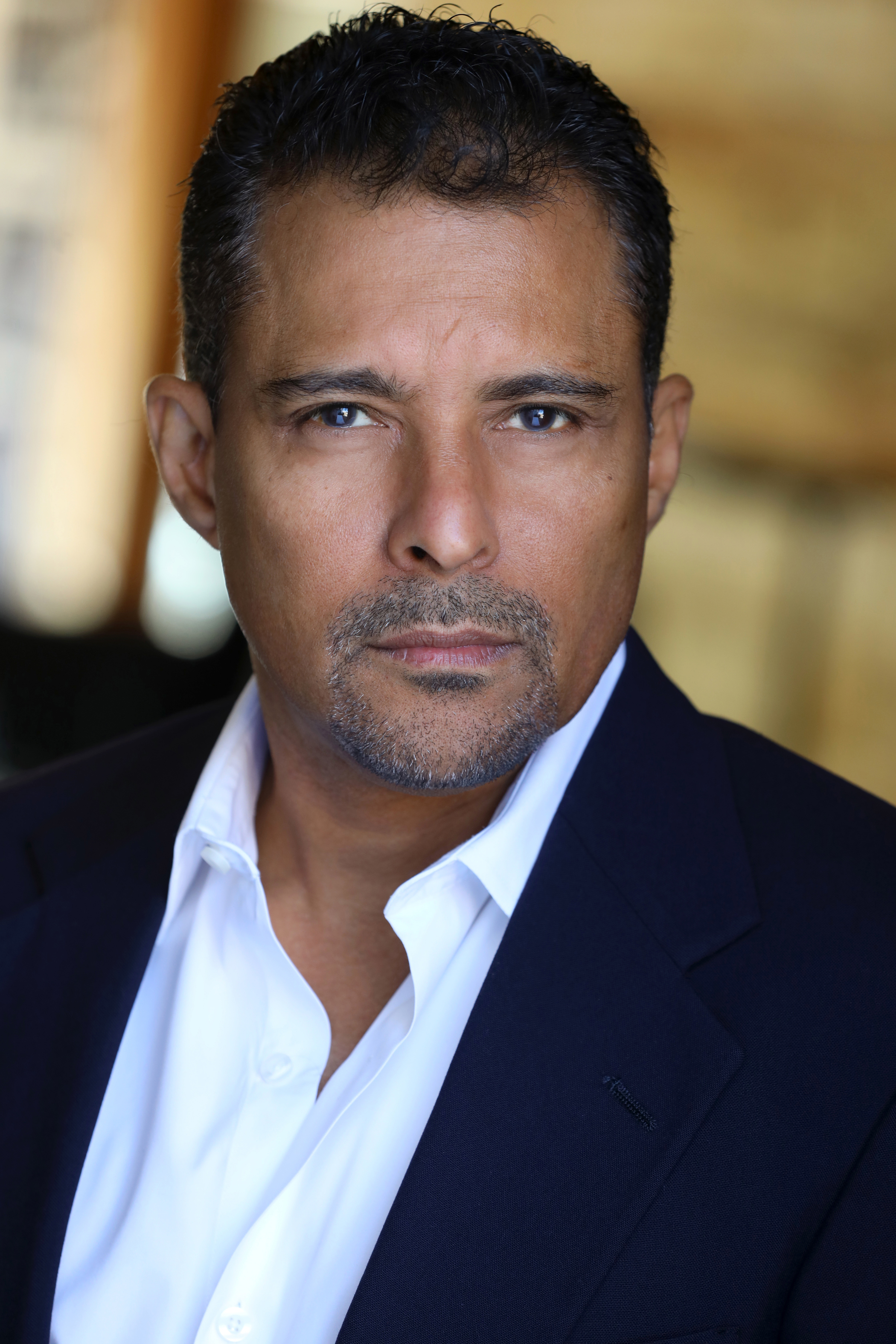
Alex Paez

Alex Paez is an American actor, musician and former restaurateur.

== Career ==
Paez began his career in 1971 appearing in various TV commercials. In 1979, he received a Best Actor Emmy Award for his performances in Unicorn Tales, a series of mini-musicals for NBC. The following year brought a second nomination in the same category for the NBC Special Treat presentation: NYC Too Far From Tampa Blues He went on to play Benjamin in "The Me Nobody Knows" at The Morris A. Mechanic Theater in Baltimore with cast-mates Damon Evans & Tisha Campbell.

He recorded "What A Piece of Work Is Man" for the movie version of Hair (1979); a duet with David Lasley. Sad to say, the song - along with "Frank Mills", "Air" and many others - were cut from the final version of the film.

In 1980 he was cast as Prince Choi Amid Sin Du in the Garry Marshall pilot "Katmandu" for Paramount Pictures starring Vicki Lawrence, Alice Ghostly and Victor Buono, and he played a young mugger in CBSʼ "Stone Pillow" opposite Lucille Ball. The mid 80s brought with them various opportunities. In particular, the roles of Elio Escobar in the Miami Vice episode “The Maze” & Santino Amaro in the Kay O'Brien MD episode “Dollars & Sense” for NBC & CBS respectively.

In 1987 he made his Broadway debut as Momo (Mohammed) at The Royale Theatre (now The Jacobs Theatre) in Hal Princeʼs musical Roza! The show played to mixed reviews in both Baltimore (Center Stage) and Los Angeles (The Mark Taper Forum), but closed shortly after opening in New York.

In 1991 he took over the role of Ritchie Valens on the US National Tour of Buddy - The Buddy Holly Story, with stops at Toronto's Royal Alexandra & Princess Of Wales Theaters. He later relocated to London to play the role at the Victoria Palace & The Strand (now The Novello) Theatres in the West End.

Off Broadway, he played the headstrong patriarch Martin Valdovinos in the Musical ¡Americano! at New World Stages. Garcín in "Azul" at The Eugene O'Neill Theater Center in Waterford CT & as George/Dave in "East Carson Street" at The Bell Theater in Holmdel, NJ

After relocating to Los Angeles, the offers changed, and Paez began playing such roles as: the good guy, the Detective, the Politician, and the occasional Military Man in such shows as: NYPD Blue, The District, Charmed, The West Wing, Monk, CSI: Miami, Commander In Chief, Boston Legal, Dexter: Resurrection and various movies of the week and mini-series, including A Gunfighter's Pledge and Meteor.

Along with his Ex Wife, he owned & operated two locations (Venice & Burbank) of Centanni Trattoria in Los Angeles.

== Filmography ==
Year	Title	Role	Notes
1977	The Stowaway	Peter	NBC Short
1977	The Magnificent Major	Marin	NBC Short
1977	The Magic Hat	Andy	NBC Short
1978	Big Apple Birthday	Aladdin	NBC Short
1978	Carnival Circus	Andy	NBC Short
1978	Alex And The Wonderful Doo-Wah Lamp	Alex	NBC Short
1979	NYC Too Far From Tampa Blues	Tom	NBC Special Treat
1980	Katmandu	Prince Choi Amid Sin Du	Pilot (Garry Marshall Producer)
1980	Coach Of The Year	Hector Estrada	NBC Movie Of The Week
1984	Kate & Allie	College Student	Episode: "Back To School"
1985	The Cosby Show	Al	Episode: "Jitterbug Break"
1985	Miami Vice	Elio Escobar	Episode: "The Maze"
1985	Stone Pillow	Young Thug	CBS Movie Of The Week
1986	Charley Hannah	Lance	NBC Movie Of The Week
1986	Kay O'Brien	Santino Amaro	Episode: "Dollars & Sense"
1988	Tattingers	Julio Martinez	Episode: "Rest In Peas"
1989	A Man Called Hawk	Victor Lael	Episode: "The Divided Child"
2001	The District	Diego Salvador	Episode: "Night Moves"
2001	NYPD Blue	INS Agent Joe Ramos	Episode: "Puppy Love"
2002	The West Wing	David Guerrero	Episode: "College Kids"
2002	CSI: Miami	Detective Martin Puig	Episode: Losing Face Episode: Breathless
2003	Charmed	Cop 1	Episode: "The Importance Of Being Phoebe"
2003	Monk	The Patient Waiter	Episode: "Mr. Monk Goes To Mexico"
2005	Boston Legal	Officer Coulier	Episode: "Schmidt Happens"
2005	Commander In Chief	Carlos	Episode: "Rubie Dubidoux And The Brown Bound Express"
2006	Mystery Woman: Oh Baby	Detective Ortiz	Hallmark Series
2007	Pandemic	Jose Ruiz	TV Mini Series
2008	A Gunfighter's Pledge	Eddie Aguilar	TV movie
2008	Depth Charge	Lieutenant Tim Michaels	TV movie
2009	Meteor	Lieutenant Finn	TV Mini Series
2010	Isaac The Psychic: Your Cosmic Sidekick	Isaac Robespierre Nathaniel Worthington III	Independent Short
2011	Up From The Minors	Danny Lopez	Independent Short
2012	Rosita Lopez For President	Felipe Santos	A.F.I. Short
2012	The Sound!	Bobby Casilla	Independent Short
2012	Blackout	Detective Bert Jackson	TV Mini Series
2013	Late Bloomers	Marcello Sosa	Pilot
2013	The Great Feye	Feye Phofum	Independent Short
2015	Agents Of S.H.I.E.L.D.	TAC Agent	Episode: "Melinda"
2018	Red Dead Redemption II	Voice – Local Pedestrian	
2024	Here's Yianni	Manny	Independent Film
2025	Dexter: Resurrection	Mayor Thompson	Episode: "And Justice For All"
