= Chippendales =

Erotic dance troupe

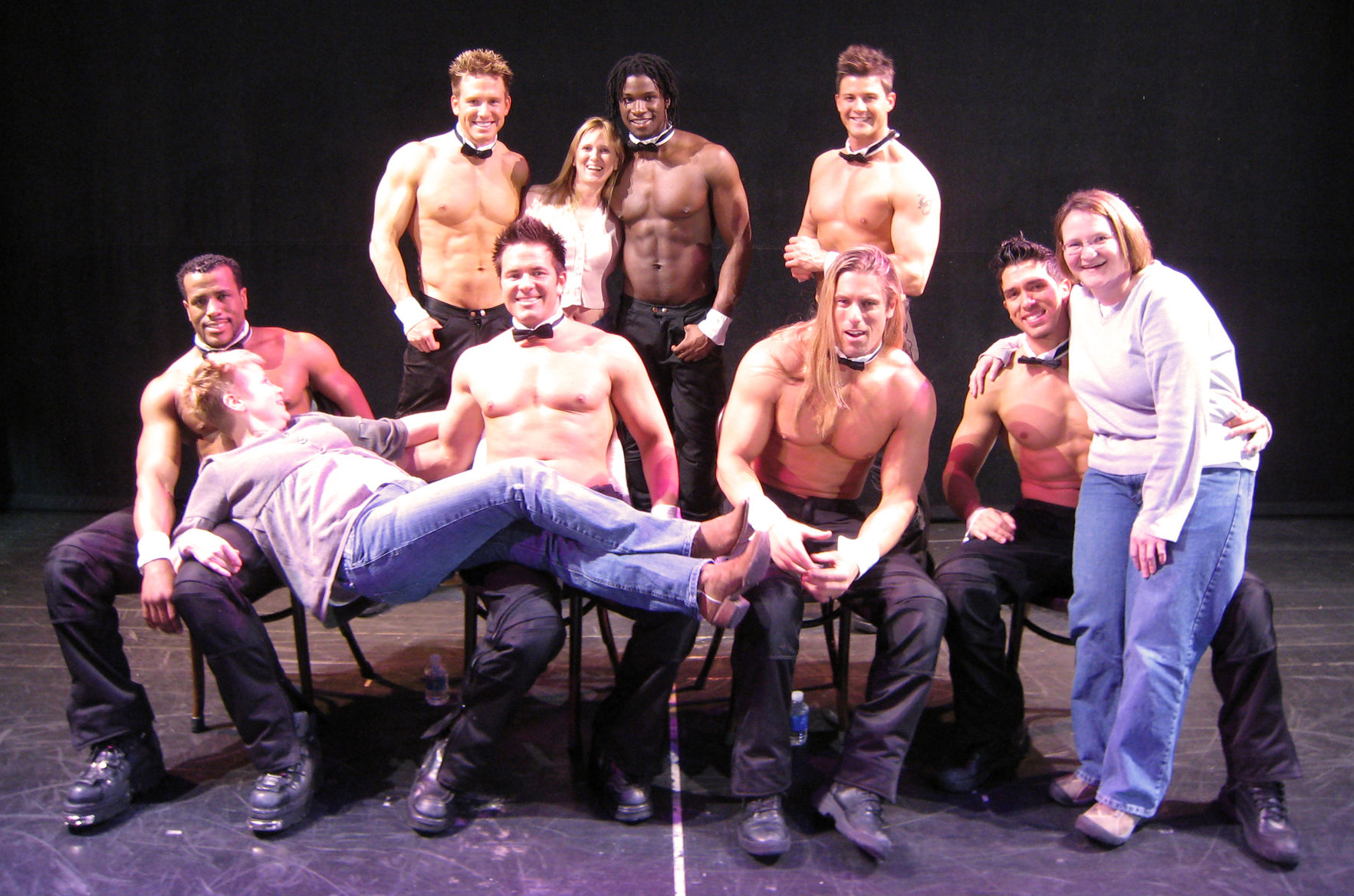
- Chippendales dancers in Las Vegas with fans
- Formation: 1979
- Type: Theatre group
- Purpose: Erotic
- Location(s): New York City Los Angeles Las Vegas
- Website: www.Chippendales.com

Chippendales is a touring dance troupe best known for its male striptease performances and for its dancers' distinctive upper body costume of a bow tie, collar, and shirt cuffs worn on an otherwise bare torso with jeans and undergarment.

Established in 1979, Chippendales was the first all-male stripping troupe to make a business performing for mostly female audiences. The company produces Broadway-style burlesque shows worldwide and licenses its intellectual property for select consumer products ranging from apparel and accessories to slot machines. The Chippendales perform at Planet Hollywood Las Vegas in Las Vegas.

== History ==
Chippendales was founded by Indian American entrepreneur Somen "Steve" Banerjee and Los Angeles–based lawyer Bruce Nahin. In 1975, Banerjee bought a failing West Los Angeles bar named Destiny II. In 1979, Banerjee and Nahin renamed the bar "Chippendales" and began hosting exotic dance nights for women, which became a major hit.

Banerjee opened clubs in New York, Dallas, and Denver, and three touring troupes toured around the US and Europe.

Similar nightclubs soon followed. Banerjee was worried about the competition and attempted to burn down at least three of them.

In 1987, Banerjee hired his close associate Ray Colon to murder his business partner Nick De Noia. Colon later hired Gilbert Rivera Lopez to murder De Noia. Banerjee also plotted to have two other former associates killed. He was arrested in 1993 for murder for hire, racketeering, and attempted arson, for which he was sentenced to 26 years on a plea bargain. He hanged himself in his cell a year later.

In 2020, the troupe turned their show into workout videos as an alternative form of entertainment/exercise to people in lockdown and quarantine due to the COVID-19 pandemic.

== Legal affairs ==
The company continues to battle similar male revues in the courts. In 1980, Chippendales successfully registered its "Cuffs and Collar" uniform as a trademark, following an agreement with Hugh Hefner that was brokered by Playboy model Dorothy Stratten. However, because this registration was based on "acquired distinctiveness", Chippendales filed a subsequent application for the same mark in an effort to have the mark recognized as being inherently distinctive. The Trademark Trial and Appeal Board affirmed the decision of the examiner that the mark was not inherently distinctive with one member of the panel dissenting. The Trademark Trial and Appeal Board noted that its decision in no way detracted from the rights flowing from the registration in 2003: "However, the fact that the applicant already owns an incontestable registration for the Cuffs & Collar Mark should serve as no small consolation in spite of our decision here."

On October 1, 2010, the U.S. Court of Appeals for the Federal Circuit affirmed the decision of the Trademark Trial and Appeal Board. Nothing in that decision affected the validity of the 2003 registration. One of the reasons for upholding the decision was the testimony of Chippendales' own expert, who admitted the male dancers' outfits were "inspired" by those of the Playboy Bunny, who also feature a bow-tie and shirt cuffs.

== Notable dancers and hosts ==
Former The Bachelor fiancée Vienna Girardi hosted the Chippendales' "Ultimate Girls Night Out" in November 2010. Karina Smirnoff of Dancing with the Stars hosted the following month. Ronnie Magro of Jersey Shore guest hosted an event in February 2011. It was reported that Jeff Timmons would be performing with the group through the summer. Jaymes Vaughan and James Davis appeared on The Amazing Race 21 as current Chippendales dancers. In 2012, Joey Lawrence was a dancer for a special engagement in June at the Rio All Suite Hotel and Casino in Las Vegas. Former dancers from the inception of the 1980s Chippendales choreographed show include Michael Rapp, John Bernard Richardson, Dean Mammales, Scott Marlowe, and Jonathan Hagan.

== In popular culture ==
The 1990 Saturday Night Live sketch "Chippendales Audition" featured Chris Farley competing with guest host Patrick Swayze to become a Chippendales dancer.

The 1997 British comedy film The Full Monty is based on a striptease group similar to Chippendales.

Films and television series based on the real story of Chippendales and its founder Steve Banerjee include the 2000 television movie The Chippendales Murder, directed by Eric Bross; the 2001 direct-to-video film Just Can't Get Enough, and the 2022 Hulu miniseries Welcome to Chippendales.

Others who have attempted to make a film about the Chippendales story include Tony Scott in 2009, producer Alan Ball in 2014, Salman Khan in 2016, and Craig Gillespie in 2017, in a film that would have starred Dev Patel.

The true story of Chippendales has also been the subject of several episodes of true crime series, as well as the 2021 Amazon Prime and Discovery+ four-part documentary series Curse of the Chippendales, written and directed by Jesse Vile.

== Literature ==
- David Henry Sterry: Master of Ceremonies: A True Story of Love, Murder, Roller Skates and Chippendales (Grove Atlantic, 2008, ISBN 978-1841958767)
- K Scot MacDonald: Deadly Dance: The Chippendales Murders (Kerrera House Press, 2014, ISBN 978-0991665327)

== See also ==
- Australia's Thunder from Down Under
- Dreamboys
