= Unicorn Tales =

1970s American children's television

Unicorn Tales is a series of eight musical short films for young audiences created and directed by Nick De Noia in association with NBC that aired sporadically as television specials as well as 16 mm educational films. Each 23-minute episode, made in 1977 or 1978, tells a modern version of a fairy tale with three songs integral to the story's narratives and themes. Some of the child actors went on to later fame, including Ava Haddad, Alex Paez, Michael Eric Kramer, Tisha Campbell, Marcelino Sanchez, and Trini Alvarado. Most episodes were set in Unicorn City, a lightly fictionalized version of New York City with the same mayor, Abraham Beame, featuring a multicultural cast. A stock company of actors appeared in various episodes, usually in different roles, although characters from The Magic Hat appear in Carnival Circus. A lead actor in one episode may be an extra in others.

== Episodes ==
Lyrics by writer unless otherwise specified. De Noia introduces many of the episodes in a jean jacket with a unicorn on the back. After a guest appearance by Isaac Asimov, later episodes are introduced by characters. Most lead into the story with "Once upon a time in the here and the now..."

=== 1977 ===
- The Magic Pony Ride (The Ugly Duckling), written by Bill C. Davis and Nick De Noia, music composed and conducted by Gerard Bernard Cohen, lyrics by Anne S. Orwin. Outcast Jennifer (Kelly Ellen Collins) relates to outcast pony Corny, who can talk to her.
- The Stowaway (Pinocchio), written by Nick De Noia, music by Gerard Bernard Cohen, lyrics by Anne S. Orwin. Orphan Peter (Alex Paez) escapes Italy by stowing away on a ship and tries to fit into Little Italy, where he is taken in by Gepetto De Angeles (Sid Baird), and aided by Jimmy the pizza man (Phil Black, choreographer for the series) who send him to school, where he tells tall tales to get people to like him, scratching his nose whenever he tells them.
- The Magic Hat (The Emperor's New Clothes), written by David Wolf, music by Jack Feldman. Andy (Alex Paez) is a new kid in the neighborhood and doesn't think kids will like him. Grover (Dennis Ferden), one of the movers, gives him a hat to help him inspire confidence in meeting others, telling him that it's magic. The other kids take to him right away, apart from bully Howard (John Femia) who wants the hat for himself.
- The Magnificent Major (The Wizard of Oz), written by William P. Milling and David Wolf, music by Gerard Bernard Cohen, conducted by Steven Orich, guest hosted by Isaac Asimov. Daisy Bunsen (Tisha Campbell) does not want to read The Wonderful Wizard of Oz for school thinking seeing the movie is good enough. Her friends (Renee Haynes, John Nevitt, Alex Paez) are building a veeblefetzer, which she accidentally activates. It appears to send her to the future, run by The Grand Poloni (Anthony Mucci) who has banned all reading and books, and kids spend all their time playing video games. A robot called the Magnificent Major (Paul Gantt) unobtrusively maintains a library and tries to protect her from The Grand Poloni, who tries to make her burn the book, which, despite her animosity toward reading, she is not willing to do. When the Grand Poloni puts her on trial, the Major has her read the book from the witness stand as her defense, changing public opinion.

=== 1978 ===
- The Maltese Unicorn (The Boy Who Cried Wolf), written by David Wolf, music by Ed Linderman, arranged and conducted by Arnold Gross. Brian Watson (John Nevitt) has a reputation for fibbing, so when his parents' (Lea Collins, Peter Shawn) Maltese Unicorn statue that they purchased on their honeymoon is broken, Brian seeks out the help of a private detective, a goofy Sherlock Holmes enthusiast named Holmes McGuffin (Bill Drew) to determine who framed him, including investigating his sister (Kelly Ellen Collins) and grandmother (Lorna Dunes).
- Alex and the Wonderful Doo-Wah Lamp (Aladdin), written by David Wolf, music by Donald Alan Siegal, orchestrated by Michael Abene, lyrics by Susan Birkenhead. Alex Bramble (Alex Paez) loses the election for class president to Susan Underhill (Elise Stiefel), the most disliked person in his class. His sister (Ava Haddad) tries to cheer him up, but he realizes he is late to help Uncle Ernie (Phil Black) clean up his shop. While cleaning, he finds and old fashioned lamp and releases a trio of genies modeled on The Andrews Sisters: Jane (Jesse M. Cohen), Jan (Robin G. Cooley), and June (Kathy Ingraham) that grant him three wishes.
- Big Apple Birthday (Alice in Wonderland), written by David Wolf, music by Thomas Tierney, orchestrated and conducted by J. 'Billy' Ver Planck. Amy Patterson (Kelly Ellen Collins) wakes up on her tenth birthday completely bored with life because every day is the same. Her mother (her mother (Lea Collins, billed immediately below as "Her Mother") and father (Tierney) try to convince her otherwise, but what they say repeats things they said yesterday, and her brother, Gordon (Anthony Ventresca) is being similarly annoying. She is sent from their suburban home into Unicorn City to visit her Aunt Lucy (Maria Malfitano), and meets an array of unusual people living in the same apartment building, all of whom know her aunt, and all of whom insist that she has a beagle named Charlie, which makes Amy think that they mean a different Lucy. In the climax, she encounters numerous fairy tale characters (Rep Gurst, series assistant choreographer Robin Black, John Nevitt, Trini Alvarado, Alex Paez, Phil Rash, Ann Nevill, Peter Taylor, and others, including Marcelino Sanchez) who inform her that the unusual things that made them famous happened on days that began like any other.
- Carnival Circus (Cinderella), written by David Wolf, music by Thomas Tierney, orchestrated and conducted by J. 'Billy' Ver Planck. Andy (Alex Paez) is the ringmaster of a carnival circus the neighborhood kids are performing in the park. Kelly (Kelly Ellen Collins) wants to participate, but she thinks she is too clumsy and getting in the way too much. Andy tries to help her find her place in the circus as two idiots scheme to acquire the land on which they intend to perform, believing it to be rich in oil. Frannie (Ava Haddad) is performing as a fat lady using a fake suit, as are Elise Stiefel as the Bearded Lady and Peter Taylor as The World's Strongest Man. Howard (John Femia) and Lonnie (Michael Eric Kramer) return from The Magic Hat (Andy is presumably also the same character, as is Kelly, though her clumsiness was not address in the other film). Ultimately, Kelly becomes a hit as a clown, and the oil is explained away as the result of a leaky gas station formerly on the site.

== Home video ==
The eight episodes were released on two VHS tapes by CBS/Fox Video and Playhouse Video as Unicorn Tales I and Unicorn Tales II in 1985. Each volume had two 1977 and two 1978 episodes.

== Recognition ==
The series won two Emmy Awards, and an Action for Children award in 1978.
