= Steve Banerjee =

Indian entrepreneur (1946–1994)

- সোমেন বাঁড়ুজ্জে
- Born: Somen Banerjee; October 8, 1946; Bombay, Bombay Province, British Raj
- Died: October 23, 1994 (aged 48); Los Angeles, California, United States
- Other name: Steve Banerjee
- Occupations: Entrepreneur, promoter
- Known for: Founder of Chippendales
- Spouse: Irene Tychowskyj

Somen "Steve" Banerjee (Bengali: সোমেন বাঁড়ুজ্জে, romanized: Sōmēn Barujje; October 8, 1946 – October 23, 1994) was an American entrepreneur, the founder of Chippendales, and a felon.

== Biography ==
Somen Banerjee was born in Bombay (now Mumbai), India, on October 8, 1946, to Bengali parents. He moved to the United States, anglicising his name to Steve Banerjee, where he operated a Mobil gas station and afterward a failed backgammon club. Banerjee bought a failed Los Angeles club named "Destiny II" and turned it into a nightclub that featured female mud wrestling and a "Female Exotic Dancing Night." The 1979 addition of a male stripper dance troupe performing to target female audiences was the first of its kind in the United States. Banerjee married his accountant, Irene, in the 1980s. They had two children — daughter Lindsay and son Christian.

Banerjee was charged with enlisting the aid of Ray Colon, a former Palm Springs police officer and lounge room entertainer, to commit the murder of show producer Nick De Noia in 1987, and in 1990 and 1991, a plot to kill Michael Fullington, a former Chippendales dancer and choreographer, and two other ex-Chippendales dancers, who Banerjee felt were competition to the Chippendales franchise. He eventually pleaded guilty to attempted arson, racketeering, and murder for hire. He entered into a plea bargain that would have led to 26 years in prison, and loss of his share of Chippendales. Irene had frantically managed to organize a group of character witnesses for him. She hoped it would sway the judge to reduce Steve’s penalty of 26 years.

In the early morning of October 23, 1994, hours before he was due to be sentenced, Banerjee was found dead in his cell, having hanged himself. Reports stated that while he was depressed, it was not thought he would take his own life. When Banerjee died, Irene inherited the entire Chippendales outfit, including money, properties, and associated assets. She died February 8, 2001, from breast cancer.

== In popular culture ==
Banerjee has appeared in the following fictionalized portrayals:

- The 2000 television movie The Chippendales Murder, portrayed by Naveen Andrews
- The 2002 direct-to-video movie Just Can't Get Enough, portrayed by Shelley Malil
- The 2022 Hulu miniseries Welcome to Chippendales, portrayed by Kumail Nanjiani.

Notable other attempts to film Banerjee's life story include those by director Tony Scott in 2009, by Trisha Ray and Salman Khan in 2016, and by director Craig Gillespie and actor Dev Patel in 2020.

Banerjee has also been the focus of several true crime and documentary series:

- The 2001 episode "Backstage Murder" (Season 3, Episode 13) of The FBI Files
- "The Chippendales Murders", the season 45 (2021) premiere episode of ABC's 20/20
- The first episode of Welcome to Your Fantasy, a 2021 serial podcast telling the Chippendales story.
