= Nick De Noia =

American director, screenwriter, and choreographer (1941–1987)

Nicholas John De Noia Jr.
- Born: May 14, 1941
- Died: April 7, 1987 (aged 45)
- Cause of death: Murder
- Occupations: Choreographer, director, screenwriter
- Spouse: Jennifer O'Neill (m. 1975; div. 1976)

Nicholas John De Noia Jr. (May 14, 1941 – April 7, 1987) was an American choreographer, director, and screenwriter.

He is known for his work as choreographer of the Chippendales dance troupe; and for his 1977–1978 Unicorn Tales, eight television musical short films for young audiences, for which he won two Emmy Awards.

== Career ==
=== Acting ===
In 1971, De Noia appeared in the drama film Some of My Best Friends Are..., written and directed by Mervyn Nelson. Credited as Nick DeNoia, he portrayed Phil Drew. The film follows a group of gay men and lesbians who gather at a bar in New York City's Greenwich Village on Christmas Eve. Its ensemble cast included Candy Darling, Rue McClanahan, Fannie Flagg and Carleton Carpenter.

=== Television production and choreography ===
During the 1970s, De Noia worked as a television producer, writer, director and choreographer. He created and directed Unicorn Tales, a series of eight musical short films for children produced in 1977 and 1978. The productions presented contemporary adaptations of traditional fairy tales and earned him two Emmy Awards.

In the early 1980s, De Noia was recruited by Steve Banerjee, founder of the Chippendales male dance revue, to develop its choreography and theatrical presentation. Drawing on his television production experience, De Noia introduced more elaborate routines and production elements to the performances.

De Noia subsequently helped establish Chippendales performances in New York City and developed a touring production. His commercial arrangement with Banerjee, which gave him a share of the touring business, became a source of conflict between the two men.

== Personal life ==
De Noia was married to actress Jennifer O'Neill from 1975 to 1976, although he was a closeted homosexual.

== Murder ==
On April 7, 1987, at 3:40 p.m., De Noia was shot in the face with a large-caliber pistol while sitting at his 15th-floor office desk at 264 West 40th Street, Manhattan, located near the garment district. De Noia was 45 years old at the time of his murder.

He was shot by Gilberto Rivera Lopez, recruited by Ray Colon, an accomplice of Somen ("Steve") Banerjee who originally hired Colon to murder De Noia.

At the time, De Noia no longer worked for Banerjee, and was on a national tour with his associate producer, Candace Mayeron.

De Noia had a licensing arrangement through a company called Chippendales Universal to use the name Chippendales for those tour engagements. Banerjee was dissatisfied with the business arrangement, which was memorialized on a cocktail napkin. Banerjee tried unsuccessfully to break the contract in New York courts.

The murder of Nick De Noia was orchestrated by Banerjee along with the burning of a competitor's Red Onion nightclub.

Banerjee pleaded guilty to murder, arson and RICO charges in July 1994. Under a plea bargain, Banerjee pleaded guilty and was sentenced to 26 years in prison.

Banerjee died by suicide in prison while awaiting final sentencing and, as a result, Chippendales was inherited by Banerjee's wife.

== Legacy ==
Actor Murray Bartlett portrayed Nick De Noia in the 2022–2023 Hulu miniseries Welcome to Chippendales.

== Filmography ==
=== Film ===
Year	Title	Role	Notes
1971	Some of My Best Friends Are...	Phil Drew	Credited as Nick DeNoia
