= Welcome to Chippendales =

2022 drama miniseries

- Genre: Biographical drama; Black comedy
- Created by: Robert Siegel
- Inspired by: Deadly Dance: The Chippendales Murders by: K. Scot Macdonald; Patrick MontesDeOca
- Starring: Kumail Nanjiani; Murray Bartlett; Annaleigh Ashford; Juliette Lewis
- Composer: Siddhartha Khosla
- Country of origin: United States
- Original language: English
- No. of episodes: 8

Production
- Executive producers: Robert Siegel; Kumail Nanjiani; Emily V. Gordon; Jenni Konner; Dylan Sellers; Matt Shakman; Nora Silver; Rajiv Joseph; Mehar Sethi
- Running time: 39–46 minutes
- Production companies: Limelight; Winter Coat Productions; Jenni Konner Productions; Robert Siegel and Jen Cohn's Production Company; 20th Television

Original release
- Network: Hulu
- Release: November 22, 2022 – January 3, 2023

Welcome to Chippendales is an American biographical drama television miniseries created by Robert Siegel inspired by the book Deadly Dance: The Chippendales Murders by K. Scot Macdonald and Patrick MontesDeOca. It stars Kumail Nanjiani as Somen "Steve" Banerjee, the founder of Chippendales.

Welcome to Chippendales premiered on November 22, 2022, on Hulu. It received generally positive reviews from critics and earned five Primetime Emmy Awards nominations, including for all four leads.

== Premise ==
The tale of Steve Banerjee, an Indian immigrant seeking the American dream, is chronicled in this true crime series laced with murder and sex. He builds the largest and first male strip joint, Chippendales, only to burn it down in less than ten years and wind up being an accessory to murder.

== Cast and characters ==
=== Main ===
- Kumail Nanjiani as Somen "Steve" Banerjee
- Murray Bartlett as Nick De Noia
- Annaleigh Ashford as Irene Banerjee née Tychowskyj, Steve's wife
- Juliette Lewis as Denise Coughlan, a composite character

=== Recurring ===
- Quentin Plair as Otis McCutcheon
- Andrew Rannells as Bradford Barton
- Robin de Jesús as Ray Colon
- Spencer Boldman as Lance McCrae

=== Guest ===
- Nicola Peltz as Dorothy Stratten
- Dan Stevens as Paul Snider

== Episodes ==
No.	Title	Directed by	Teleplay by	Original release date
1	"An Elegant, Exclusive Atmosphere"	Matt Shakman	Robert Siegel	November 22, 2022
In 1979, Los Angeles, Indian immigrant Somen Banerjee dreams of becoming a successful businessman much like his idol Hugh Hefner. Adopting the name Steve, he leaves his job as a gas station manager to open a backgammon club "Destiny II". Meeting club promoter Paul Snider and his wife, Playboy Playmate Dorothy Stratten, Steve convinces him to join the struggling business. After several failed gimmicks, Dorothy and Paul bring Steve to a gay bar, where he is inspired to transform their business into a male striptease show for women. Renaming the club "Chippendales", Steve enlists the help of Emmy-winning choreographer Nick De Noia while Dorothy suggests that the staff wear collars and cuffs based on the Playboy Bunnies. The club becomes a hit, but Paul clashes with Nick, who fires him as the show's emcee. Deeply jealous and controlling of Dorothy, Paul shoots her and then himself in 1980.
2	"Four Geniuses"	Matt Shakman	Robert Siegel	November 22, 2022
In the wake of his partner's murder-suicide, Steve convinces Nick to become Chippendales' full-time choreographer. Newly divorced and secretly gay, Nick auditions an entirely new troupe of performers, including experienced dancer Otis. Steve hires Irene, an accountant with suggestions to improve business, such as opening the club to men after shows to mingle with the female customers. The two begin a relationship, while the new dancers enjoy their drug-and-sex-fueled popularity. Otis becomes the club's star, but grows uncomfortable being groped for tips. Impressed when Steve arranges a religious protest of the club with news coverage for free publicity, Otis asks to learn from his less-than-ethical business practices, frustrating Nick. When frequent customer Denise approaches Nick with advice to use tearaway pants, Nick forces Steve to hire her as the show's costumer, straining their partnership.
3	"Velveeta"	Gwyneth Horder-Payton	Rajiv Joseph	November 29, 2022
By 1981, Steve has married Irene and returns to Bombay for his father's funeral, while Nick, Denise, and Irene celebrate the success of Chippendales' increasingly elaborate performances. Steve's mother refuses to join him in America, disappointed that he left the family and that his business is "not respectable". Learning that Denise introduced Irene to cocaine, Steve returns to the club, where Irene has hired handyman Ray Colon, and Denise and Nick have begun work on a Frankenstein-inspired rock opera. Distraught from his mother's words, Steve denounces the performance and angrily asserts himself as Chippendales' owner, deepening Nick and Denise's frustration and alienating Irene. Steve recruits Ray to help him photograph the dancers for a calendar without involving Nick or Denise, which proves to be the final straw for Nick, who departs on a plane for New York City.
4	"Just Business"	Gwyneth Horder-Payton	Annie Julia Wyman	December 6, 2022
In 1982, Nick makes an unsuccessful pitch for "US Male", his own version of Chippendales, and strikes up a relationship with wealthy Bradford Barton, who offers to finance a New York City Chippendales franchise. The calendar is an enormous bestseller, but Steve admits to Otis that as the club's only black dancer, he was left out of the calendar as a "business decision". When the print shop is unwilling to rush production of 10,000 new calendars, Steve buys the shop, and he and Irene are turned away from an exclusive restaurant, inspiring him to implement a membership card for the club. Nick forces Steve to accept his ultimatum: allow him to open and run the NYC franchise, or he will create his own competing show. Steve lies to Irene that this was his idea, and discovers Otis making his own calendar with Ray. Otis quits, while Ray pledges his loyalty to Steve.
5	"Leeches"	Nisha Ganatra	Jacqui Rivera	December 13, 2022
In 1983, Steve arrives in New York City for the successful opening of Nick and Denise's new Chippendales, and their "Dr. Hunkenstein" number is a hit. A snowball fight with Nick bruises Steve's ego and he returns to Los Angeles, where he is sued for the club's discriminatory membership cards. Denise is jealous of Nick's partnership with Bradford, and In 1984, Nick appears with his New York dancers on The Phil Donahue Show, infuriating Steve by receiving credit for Chippendales' creation. Confronted by a pregnant Irene, Steve admits to creating the membership cards to keep out black clientele. After an angry phone call with Steve, Nick appears on a string of talk shows, establishing himself as the face of Chippendales. Making his own disastrous media appearance, Steve is overwhelmed with insecurity and confronts a club owner for advertising a male strip show. Having seen Nick on TV, the owner dismisses Steve as a liar and an immigrant, and Ray burns down his club on Steve's orders.
6	"February 31st"	Nisha Ganatra	Annie Julia Wyman	December 20, 2022
Steve continues to frustrate Nick, while the growing class action lawsuit threatens to bankrupt the business. In 1985, Bradford suggests a Chippendales national tour, which Nick convinces Steve will expand their brand globally, even to India. Steve has Nick draw up an impromptu contract on a napkin for a 50/50 split of the tour profits in perpetuity. Neglecting to proofread an order for 500,000 new calendars for 1986, Steve struggles to reassure Irene, who tries to return his gift of an expensive necklace, but the saleswoman inspires her to "be the woman" her husband thinks she is. Irene throws herself into Steve's underhanded dealings, including watering down the bar's liquor, as they experiment with cocaine. Losing the lawsuit, Steve discovers a costly printing error in the new calendars, and is forced to declare bankruptcy. He believes Nick has cheated him out of profits from the highly successful tour, and a call from his mother, who has discovered the true nature of his business and declares him a failure, leaves Steve in tears.
7	"Paper Is Paper"	Richard Shepard	Jenni Konner	December 27, 2022
Reveling in the success of the national tour, Nick is outraged when Steve tries to launch a competing tour, and legally intervenes. Using pills and cocaine, Steve allows the LA club to exceed maximum occupancy, leading the city to finally shut it down. Denise, in love with Nick, is heartbroken when he chooses Bradford over her. At the NYC office, as Nick and Bradford plan Chippendales' upcoming European tour, a man arrives while Bradford is in the bathroom and shoots Nick dead. Steve's reaction and strange questions when she tells him about the shooting makes Irene suspicious. Later a distraught Denise confronts them at home, declaring Steve a murderer. Irene's suspicions about her husband's involvement are confirmed when he is unable to explain why he took $15,000 in cash from their safe, and she leaves with their young daughter. Steve is questioned by the FBI, and angrily protests his innocence. The agents are privately convinced Steve is guilty, but lack any hard evidence; at home, Steve retrieves a handgun.
8	"Switzerland"	Richard Shephard	Rajiv Joseph & Robert Siegel	January 3, 2023
In 1991, five years after Nick's murder, Steve lives in a village in Switzerland while also running Chippendales overseas. Nick's shooter confessed to the crime after being caught in a drug sting operation. He ratted out Ray who is working with the feds for immunity to get Steve to confess. Not knowing the FBI wired the room, Steve confessed to this and three other murders that he hired Ray to do over the last five years. Three years later, while in prison in Los Angeles, Steve is being charged for RICO; his company and assets are frozen by the government, putting his now ex wife, Irene and young daughter in financial ruin. As Steve is sitting in his empty cell, he hallucinates with Nick's ghost, who makes him realize all the damage he caused during the past ten years. Steve commits suicide hours before his sentencing. As a result, the government cannot seize his assets, and Irene inherits everything—including Chippendales.

== Production ==
=== Development ===
In May 2021, it was announced Hulu had given the series a straight-to-series order, with Robert Siegel, Rajiv Joseph and Mehar Sethi serving as writers. In October 2021, it was announced Ramin Bahrani would direct and executive produce the series, with Jenni Konner joining as an executive producer. In February 2022, it was announced Matt Shakman would replace Bahrani as director and executive producer.

=== Casting ===
Upon the initial announcement, Kumail Nanjiani was announced to star in the series. Nanjiani was first offered a role in the series in 2017, but at the time wasn't sure if he wanted to play a "bad guy" Indian immigrant. By the time the project came back around a few years later, he had a different perspective, and was more open to portraying such a character. In January 2022, Murray Bartlett and Annaleigh Ashford joined the cast of the series. In February, Dan Stevens was announced as another series regular, with Quentin Plair and Andrew Rannells in a recurring capacity, and Nicola Peltz as a guest star. In March, Robin de Jesús and Juliette Lewis joined the cast in recurring and series regular roles, respectively. In April, Spencer Boldman joined the cast in a recurring capacity.

=== Filming ===
Principal photography began by March 2022, with production briefly paused due to a positive COVID-19 test.

=== Music ===
The score was composed by Siddhartha Khosla. The album was released on December 30, 2022.

Welcome to Chippendales (Original Score)
No.	Title	Length
1.	"Welcome to Chippendales"	1:04
2.	"Somen's Dream"	1:37
3.	"Nick De Noia"	0:57
4.	"31 Days"	1:26
5.	"Banerjee"	1:21
6.	"Calendar"	0:30
7.	"Father's Funeral"	1:21
8.	"Bad Contract"	3:08
9.	"You Gave My Wife Cocaine"	1:51
10.	"Somen and Ray"	4:20
11.	"What About a Tour?"	2:02
12.	"Success"	3:54
13.	"Ray Colon"	2:22
14.	"The End of an Era"	1:52
Total length:		27:00

== Release ==
The series was released on November 22, 2022 on Hulu. Internationally, Welcome to Chippendales premiered on Disney+ via the Star hub and in Star+ in Latin America and on Disney+ Hotstar. The series premiered on Disney+ in Sub-Saharan Africa on January 11, 2023.

== Reception ==
=== Critical response ===
The review aggregator website Rotten Tomatoes reported a 73% approval rating with an average rating of 7.20/10, based on 45 critic reviews. The website's critics consensus reads, "Blessed with a twisty true story that needs little embellishment to intrigue, Welcome to Chippendales details the battle over a beefcake empire with stylistic verve." Metacritic, which uses a weighted average, assigned a score of 67 out of 100 based on 22 critics, indicating "generally favorable reviews".

== Accolades ==
Year	Award	Category	Nominee(s)	Result	Ref.
2023	Critics' Choice Awards	Best Supporting Actor in a Movie/ Miniseries	Murray Bartlett	Nominated	
2023	GLAAD Media Awards	Outstanding Limited or Anthology Series	Welcome to Chippendales	Nominated	
2023	Golden Trailer Awards	Best Billboard (for Feature Film or TV/Streaming Series)	Welcome to Chippendales	Won	
2023	Primetime Creative Arts Emmy Awards	Outstanding Period Costumes	Peggy Schnitzer, Derek Bulger, Julie Heath (for "Leeches")	Nominated	
2023	Primetime Emmy Awards	Outstanding Lead Actor in a Limited or Anthology Series or Movie	Kumail Nanjiani	Nominated	
2023	Primetime Emmy Awards	Outstanding Supporting Actor in a Limited or Anthology Series or Movie	Murray Bartlett	Nominated	
2023	Primetime Emmy Awards	Outstanding Supporting Actress in a Limited or Anthology Series or Movie	Annaleigh Ashford	Nominated	
2023	Primetime Emmy Awards	Outstanding Supporting Actress in a Limited or Anthology Series or Movie	Juliette Lewis	Nominated	
2023	Queerties	TV Drama	Welcome to Chippendales	Nominated	
2023	Queerties	TV Performance	Murray Bartlett	Nominated	
