= 80th Golden Globe Awards =

Film award ceremony in 2023

- Official poster
- Date: January 10, 2023
- Site: The Beverly Hilton, Beverly Hills, California, U.S.
- Hosted by: Jerrod Carmichael

Highlights
- Best Film: Drama: The Fabelmans
- Best Film: Musical or Comedy: The Banshees of Inisherin
- Best Drama Series: House of the Dragon
- Best Musical or Comedy Series: Abbott Elementary
- Best Miniseries or Television movie: The White Lotus
- Most awards: Abbott Elementary; The Banshees of Inisherin (3)
- Most nominations: The Banshees of Inisherin (8)

Television coverage
- Network: NBC; Peacock (streaming)
- Ratings: 6.3 million (Nielsen ratings)

The 80th Golden Globe Awards honored the best in film and American television of 2022, as chosen by the Hollywood Foreign Press Association (HFPA). The ceremony was held on January 10, 2023, from The Beverly Hilton in Beverly Hills, California, produced by Dick Clark Productions, Jesse Collins Entertainment, and the HFPA. It aired live in the United States on NBC and streamed on Peacock. Comedian Jerrod Carmichael hosted the ceremony. This was the final Golden Globes ceremony to air on NBC before the HFPA was rebranded as the Golden Globe Foundation on June 12, 2023.

The nominees were announced on December 12, 2022. Father-daughter duo George and Mayan Lopez were scheduled to announce the nominations together, but the former dropped out after testing positive for COVID-19; he was replaced by Selenis Leyva. Eddie Murphy and Ryan Murphy were announced as the recipients of the Cecil B. DeMille Award and Carol Burnett Award, respectively.

The Banshees of Inisherin received a leading 8 nominations, including Best Motion Picture – Musical or Comedy and Best Director (Martin McDonagh), the most achieved by any film since Cold Mountain in 2004; it also, alongside ABC's first-year mockumentary Abbott Elementary, won the most awards at the ceremony with three wins.

The ceremony also marked Lisa Marie Presley's last public appearance before her death two days later on January 12.

== Ceremony information ==
On September 20, 2022, the HFPA and Golden Globe Awards producer Dick Clark Productions announced that the ceremony would be broadcast on NBC and streamed on Peacock under a one-year contract. After being the Golden Globes' regular broadcaster since 1996, NBC declined to air the previous year's ceremony in support of boycotts by various media companies, actors, and other creatives over the HFPA's history of financial malfeasance and lack of action to increase the membership diversity of the organization. The HFPA had previously approved a major restructuring in July 2022, under which HFPA interim CEO Todd Boehly agreed to establish a for-profit entity via his holding company Eldridge Industries (owner of DCP and entertainment trade publication The Hollywood Reporter) that will hold the Golden Globe Awards' intellectual property and oversee the "professionalization and modernization" of the ceremony, including "[increasing] the size and diversity of the available voters for the annual awards". The HFPA's philanthropic activities would continue separately as a non-profit entity.

Due to conflicts with NBC's Sunday Night Football (the NFL regular season has been extended with an additional game since 2021), and to avoid competing with the 2023 College Football Playoff National Championship on Monday January 9 (a game played at Inglewood's SoFi Stadium) and the 28th Critics' Choice Awards the following Sunday (January 15), the Globes ceremony was scheduled for Tuesday, January 10, 2023. It was the first Golden Globes ceremony to take place on a Tuesday since the 19th edition in 1962, as well as the first to be staged on a weeknight since the 64th Golden Globes were presented on Monday, January 15, 2007.

Among the changes include modifications to the supporting acting categories for Television: Both categories for Best Supporting Actor and Best Supporting Actress in a Series, Miniseries, or Television Film have been split into separate categories for "Musical-Comedy or Drama" and "Limited Series, Anthology Series, or Motion Picture Made for Television". However, it was announced on September 26, 2023, that both categories have been eliminated in order to make room for two new categories: "Cinematic and Box Office Achievement" and "Best Performance in Stand-Up Comedy on Television" (also known as "Best Stand-Up Comedian on Television"); both eliminated categories will now be remerged into one each, but retitled as "Best Performance by a Male Actor in a Supporting Role on Television" (or "Best Supporting Male Actor – Television") and "Best Performance by a Female Actor in a Supporting Role on Television" (or "Best Supporting Female Actor – Television"), respectively.

== Winners and nominees ==
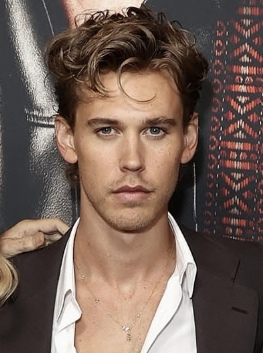
Austin Butler, Best Actor in a Motion Picture – Drama winner

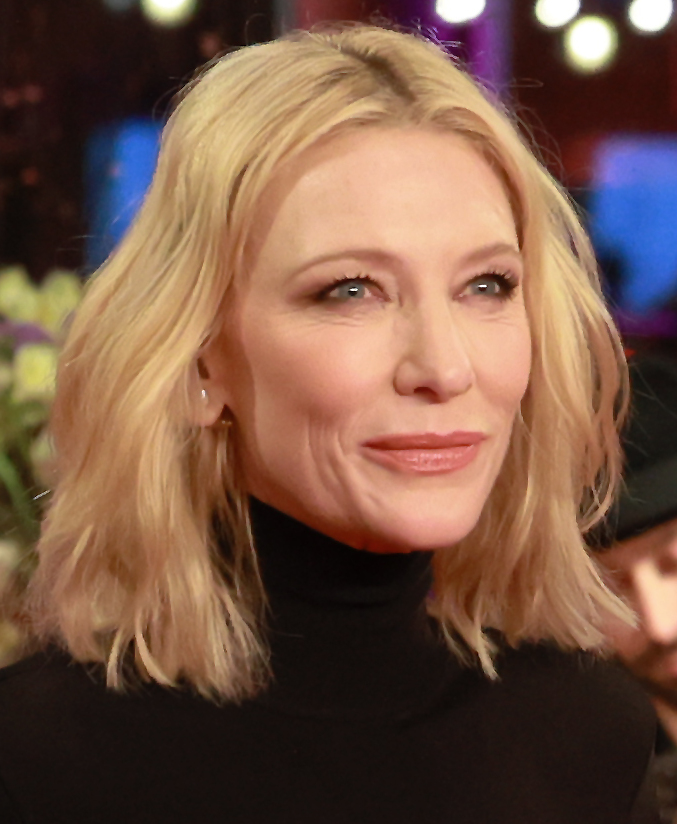
Cate Blanchett, Best Actress in a Motion Picture – Drama winner

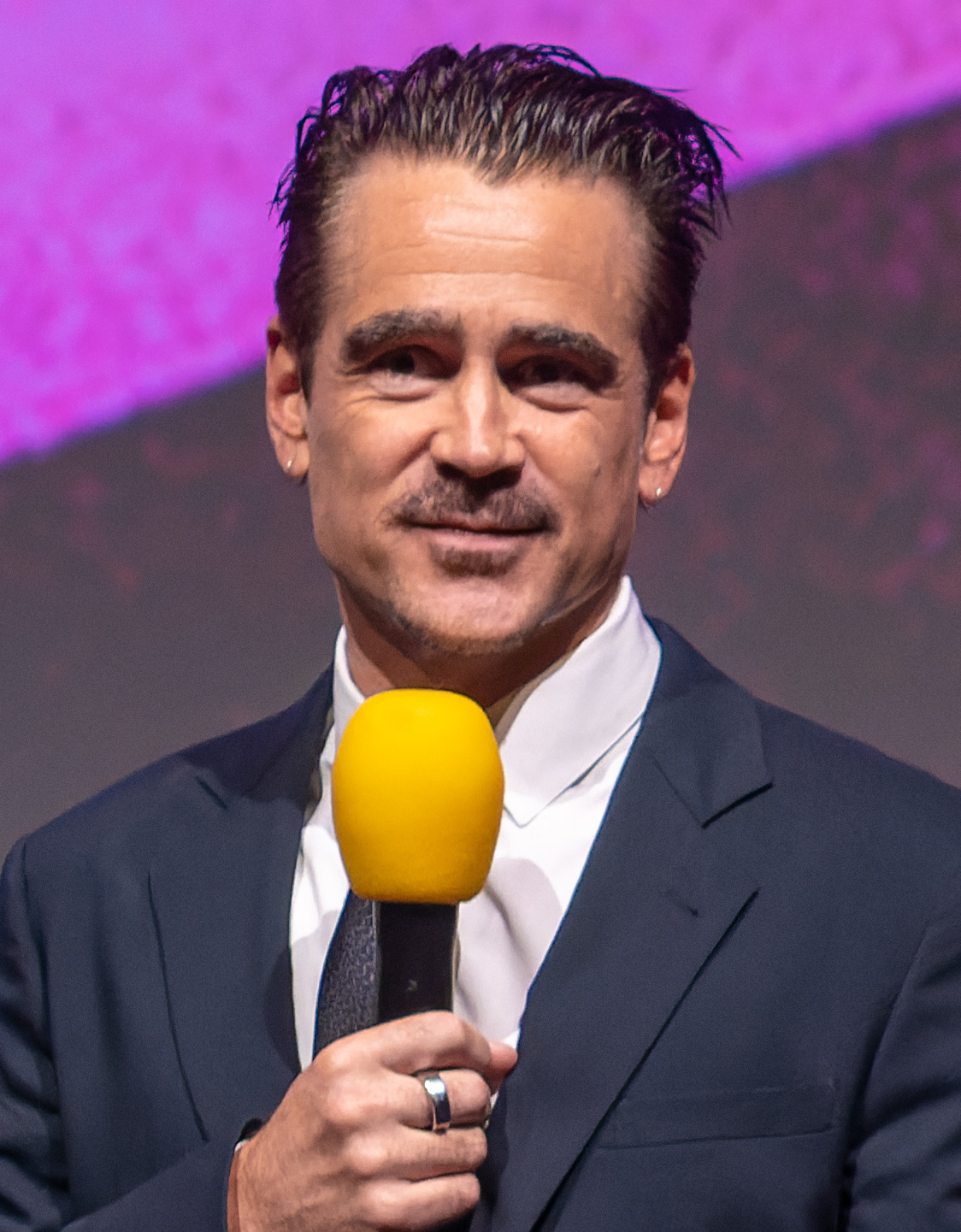
Colin Farrell, Best Actor in a Motion Picture – Musical or Comedy winner

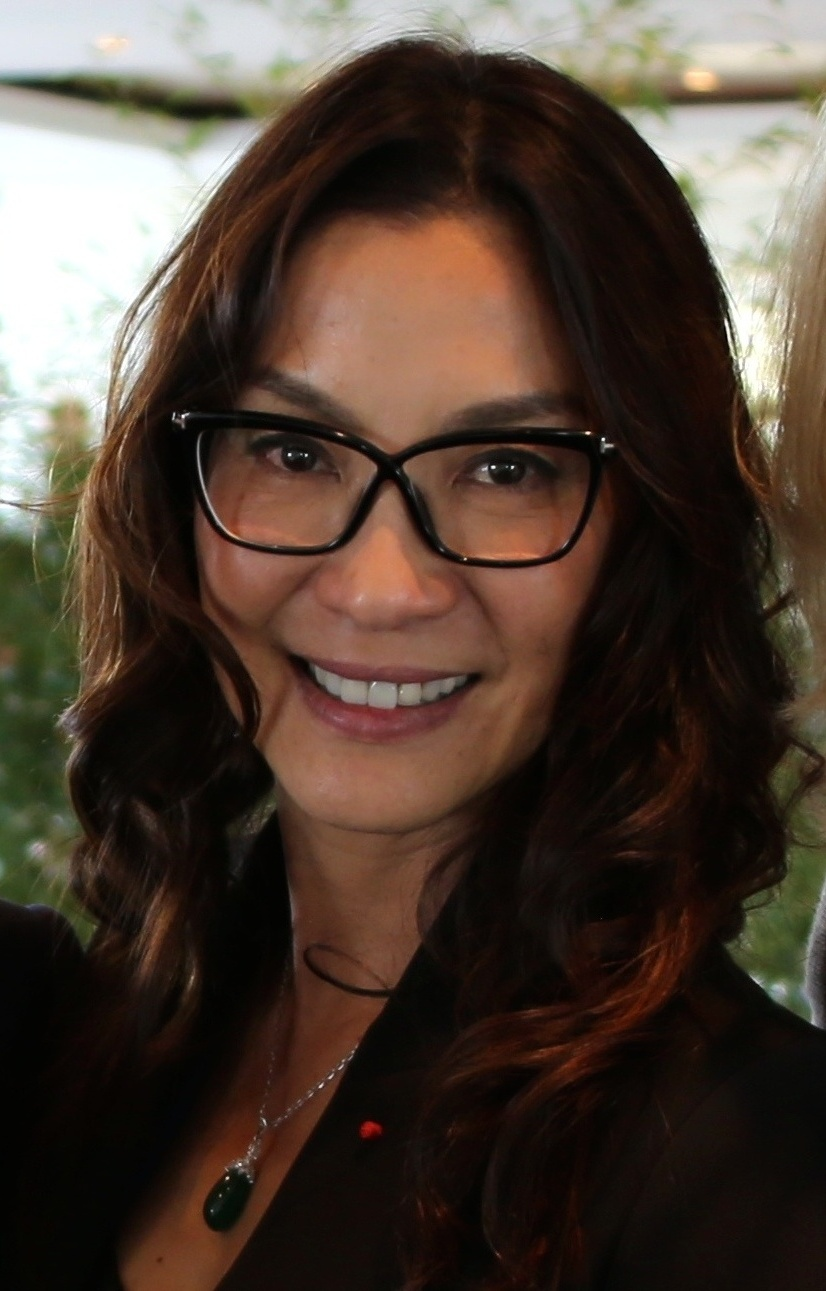
Michelle Yeoh, Best Actress in a Motion Picture – Musical or Comedy winner

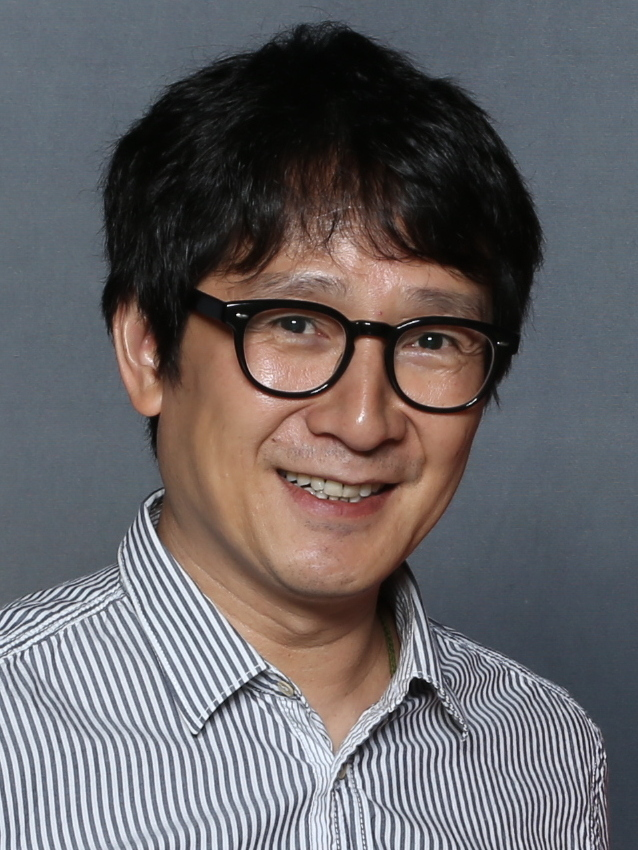
Ke Huy Quan, Best Supporting Actor winner

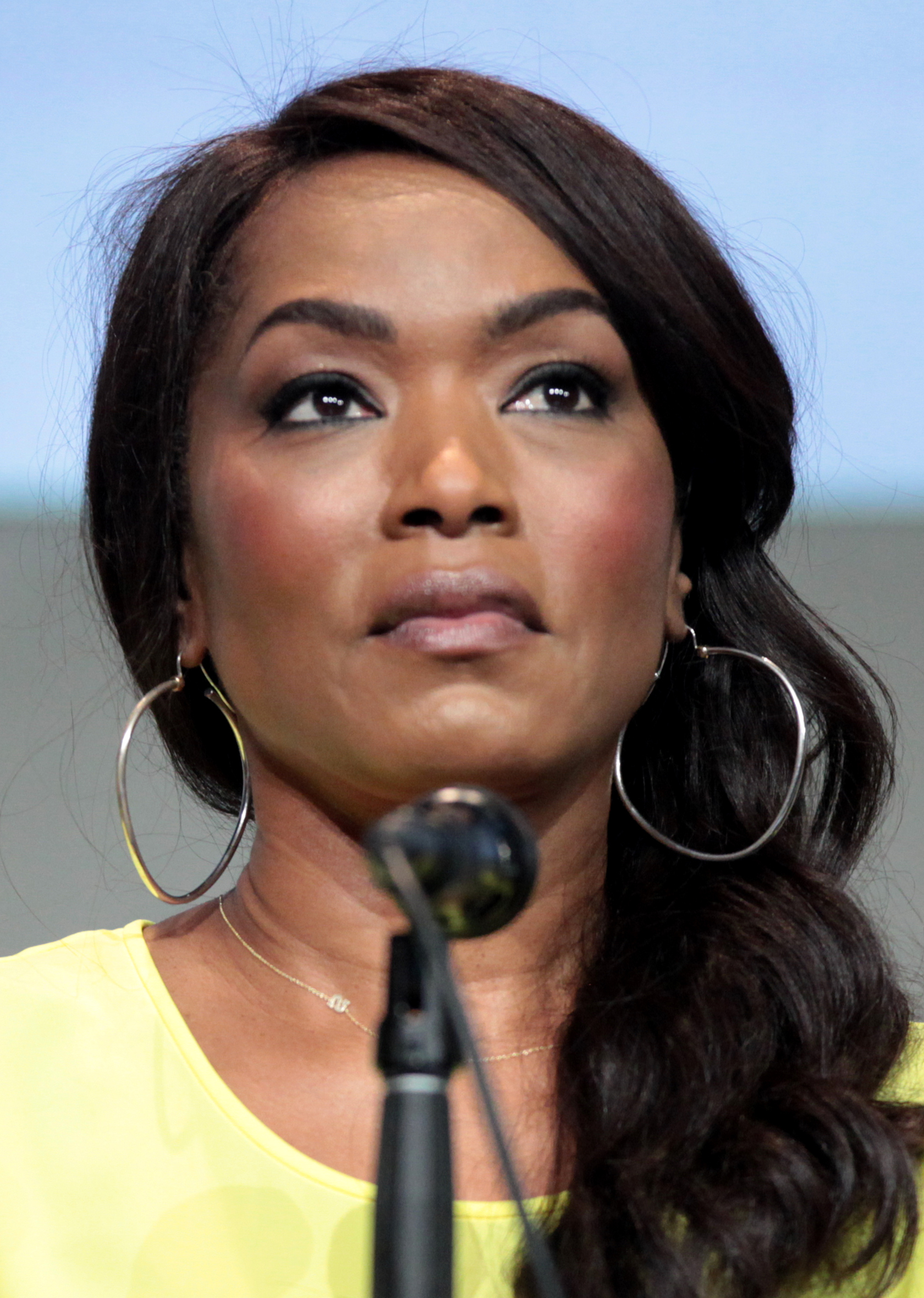
Angela Bassett, Best Supporting Actress winner

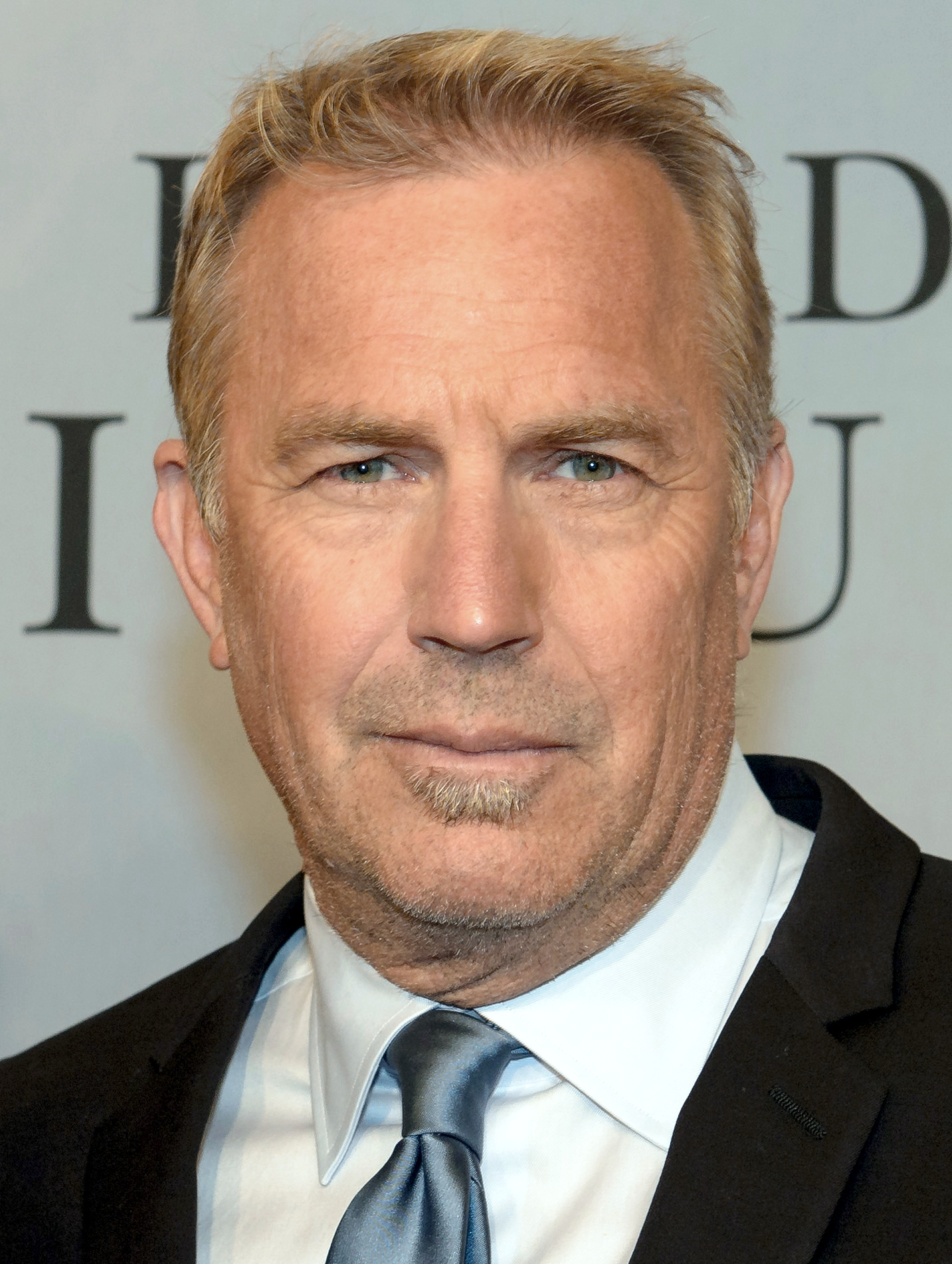
Kevin Costner, Best Actor in a Television Series – Drama winner

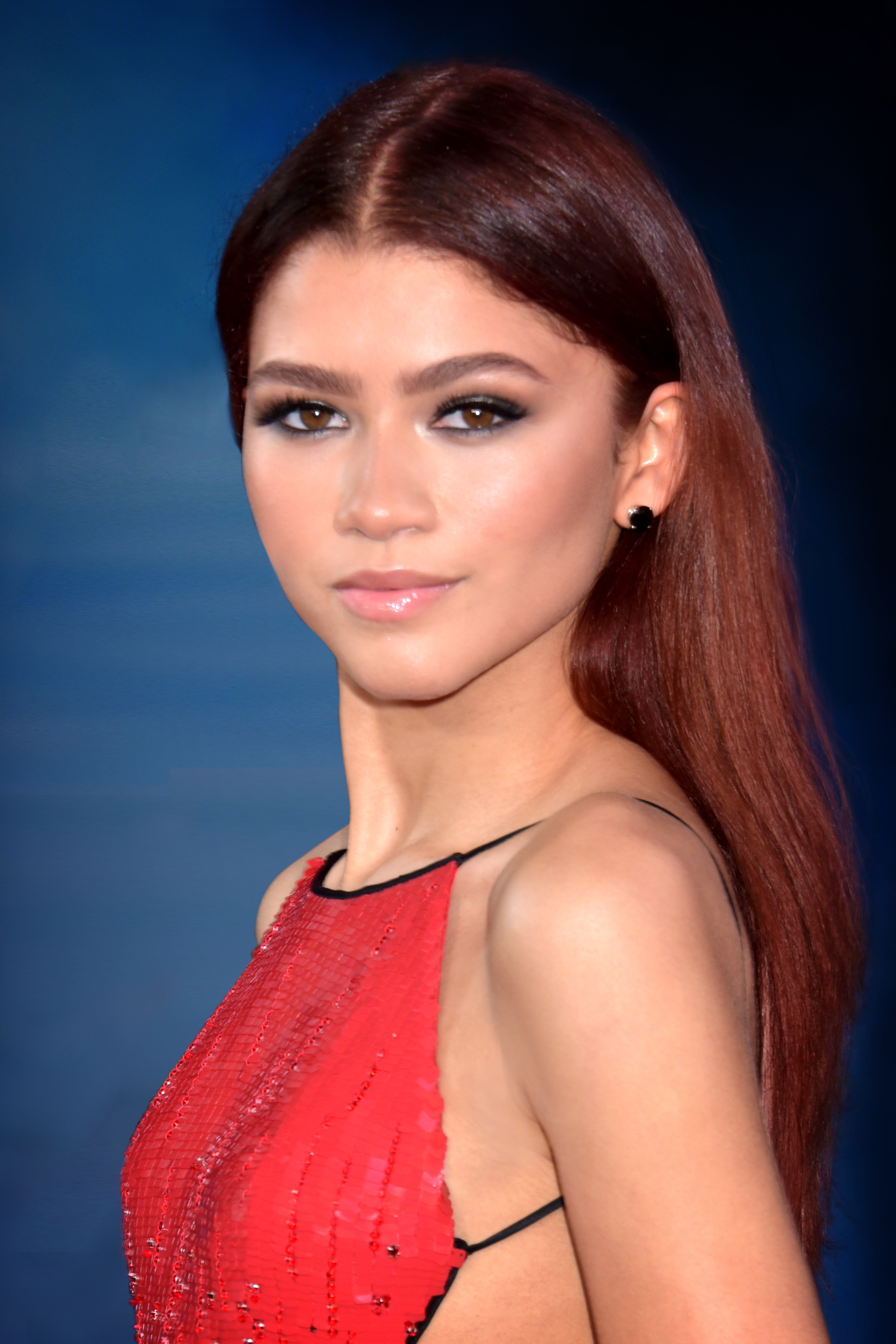
Zendaya, Best Actress in a Television Series – Drama winner

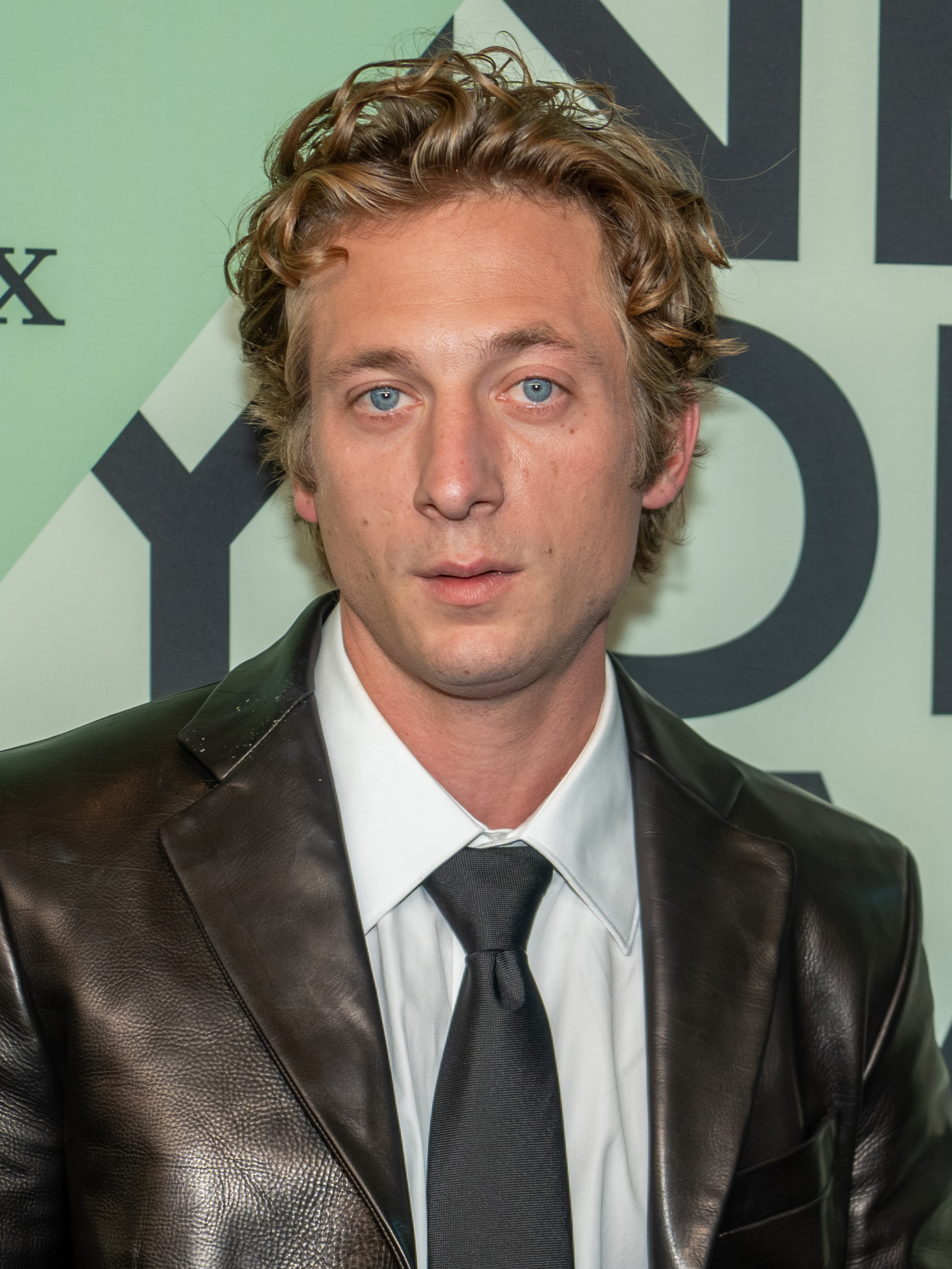
Jeremy Allen White, Best Actor in a Television Series – Musical or Comedy winner

Quinta Brunson, Best Actress in a Television Series – Musical or Comedy winner

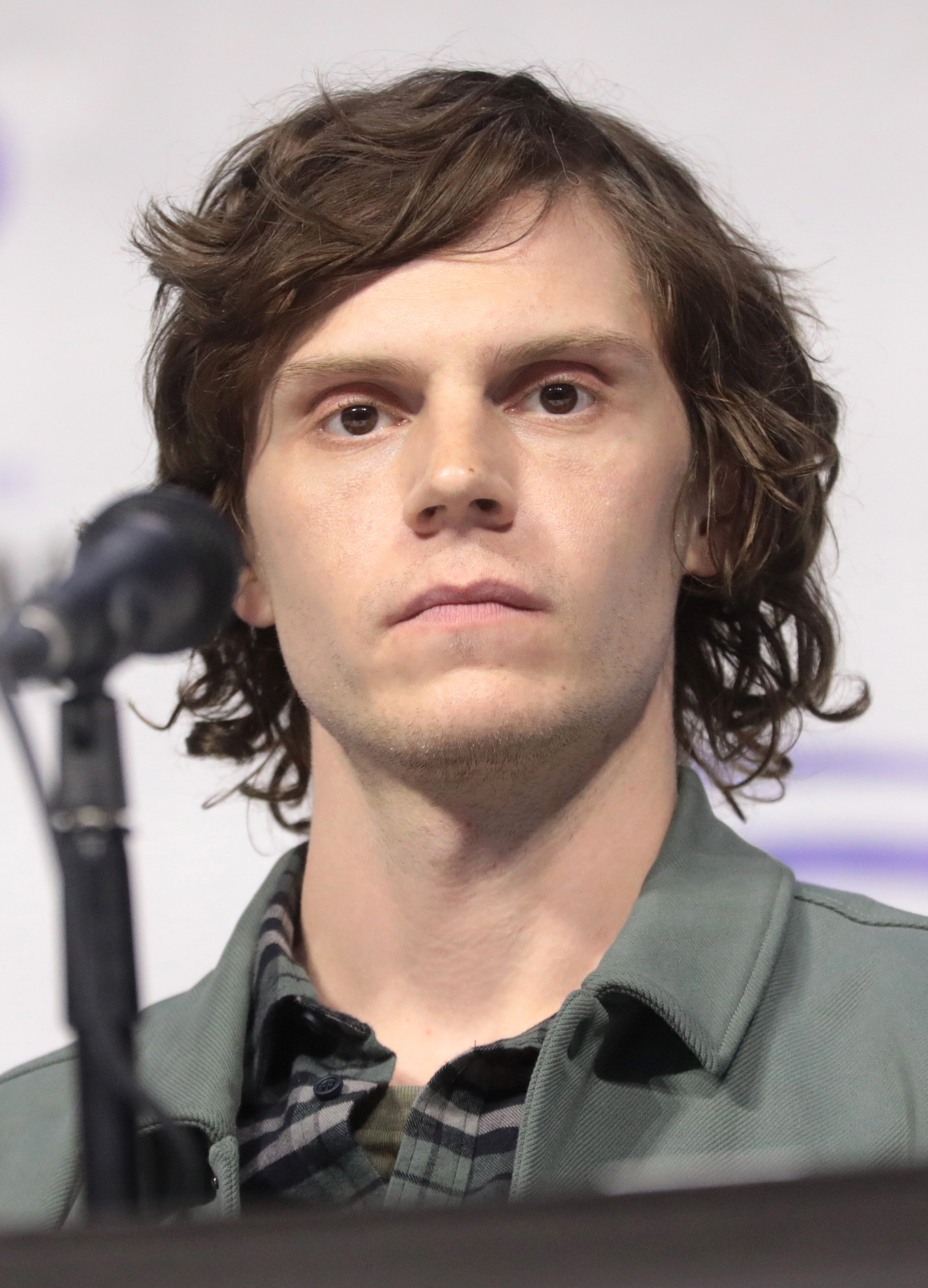
Evan Peters, Best Actor in a Limited Series, Anthology Series, or Motion Picture Made for Television winner

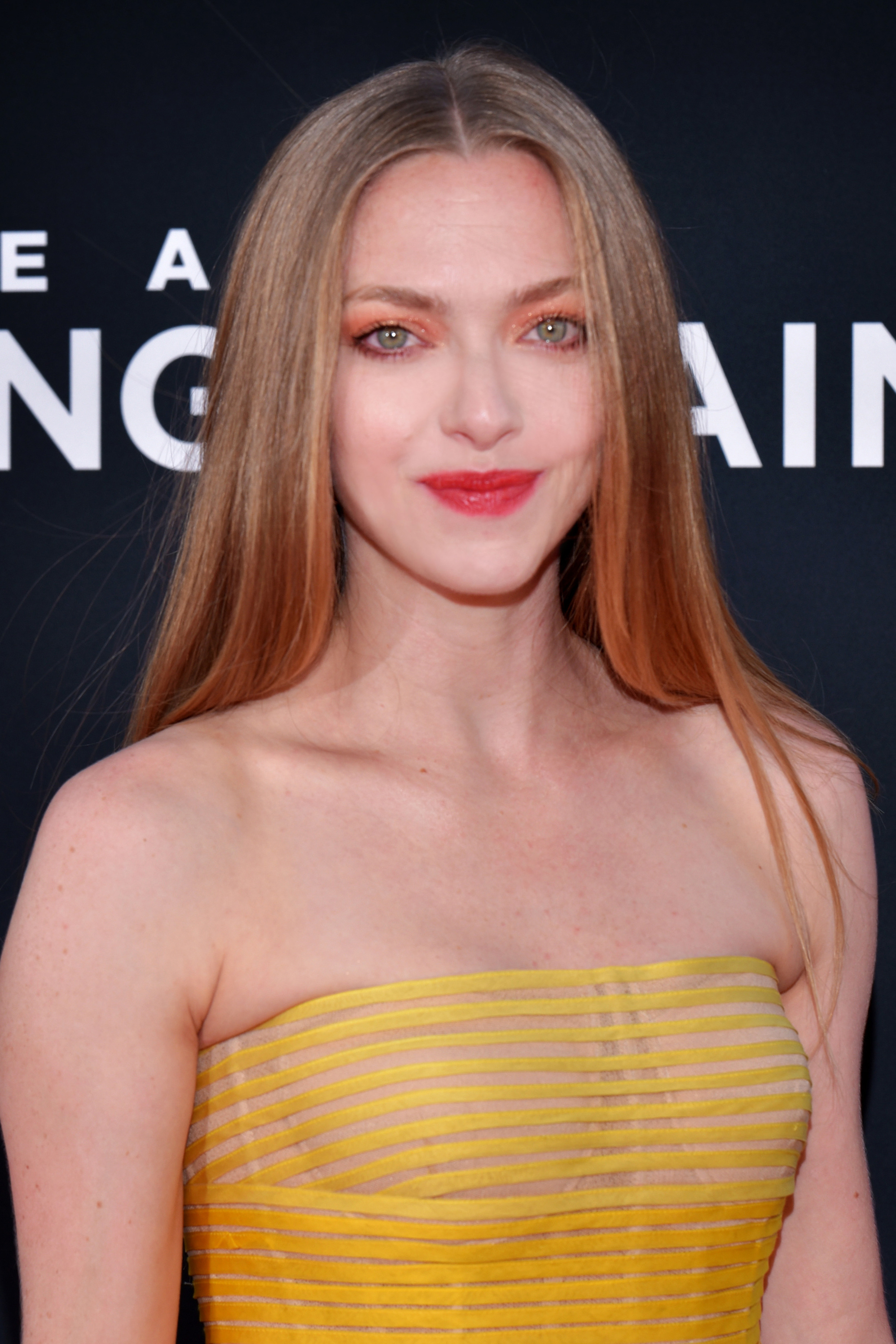
Amanda Seyfried, Best Actress in a Limited Series, Anthology Series, or Motion Picture Made for Television winner

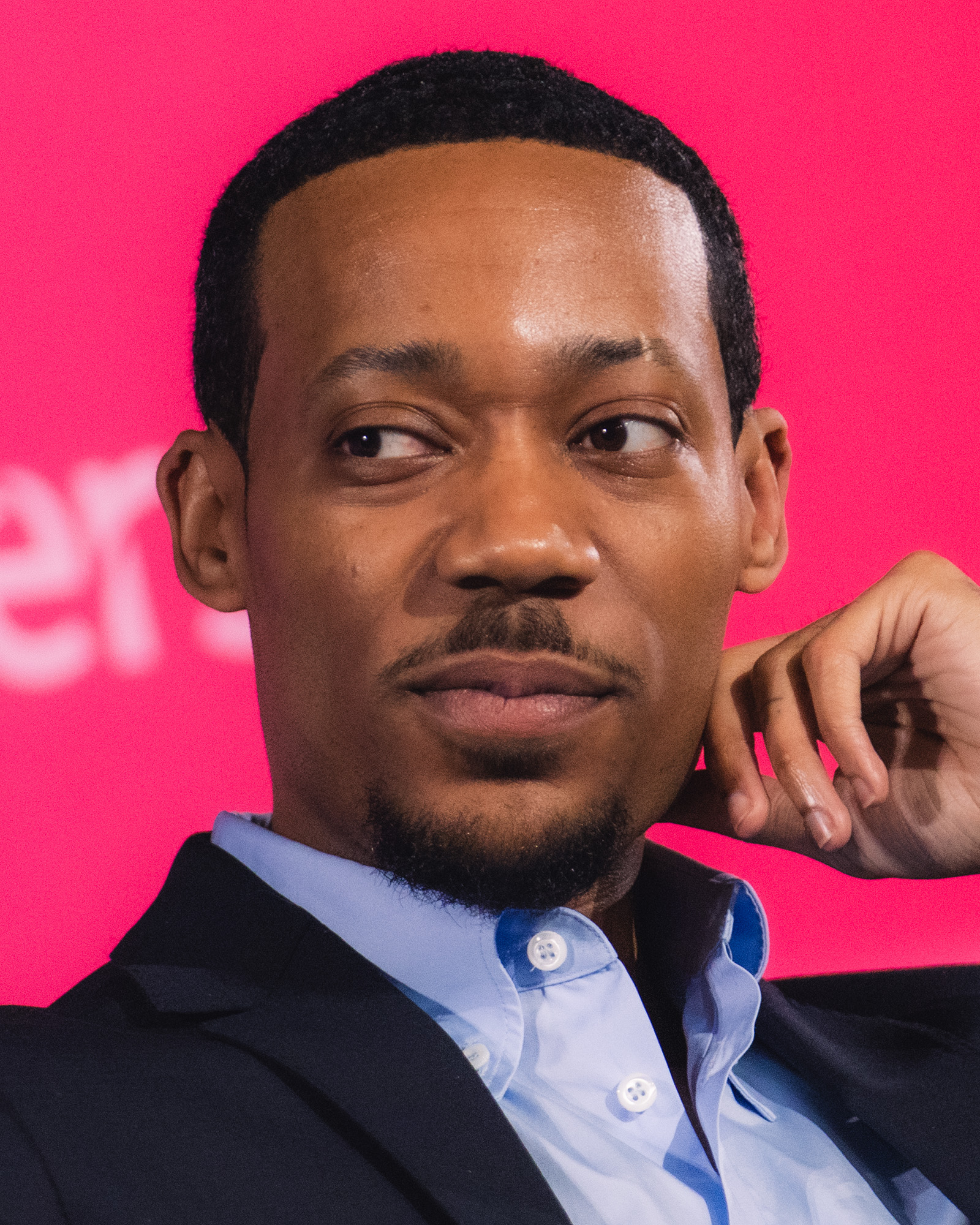
Tyler James Williams, Best Supporting Actor in a Television Series – Musical-Comedy or Drama winner

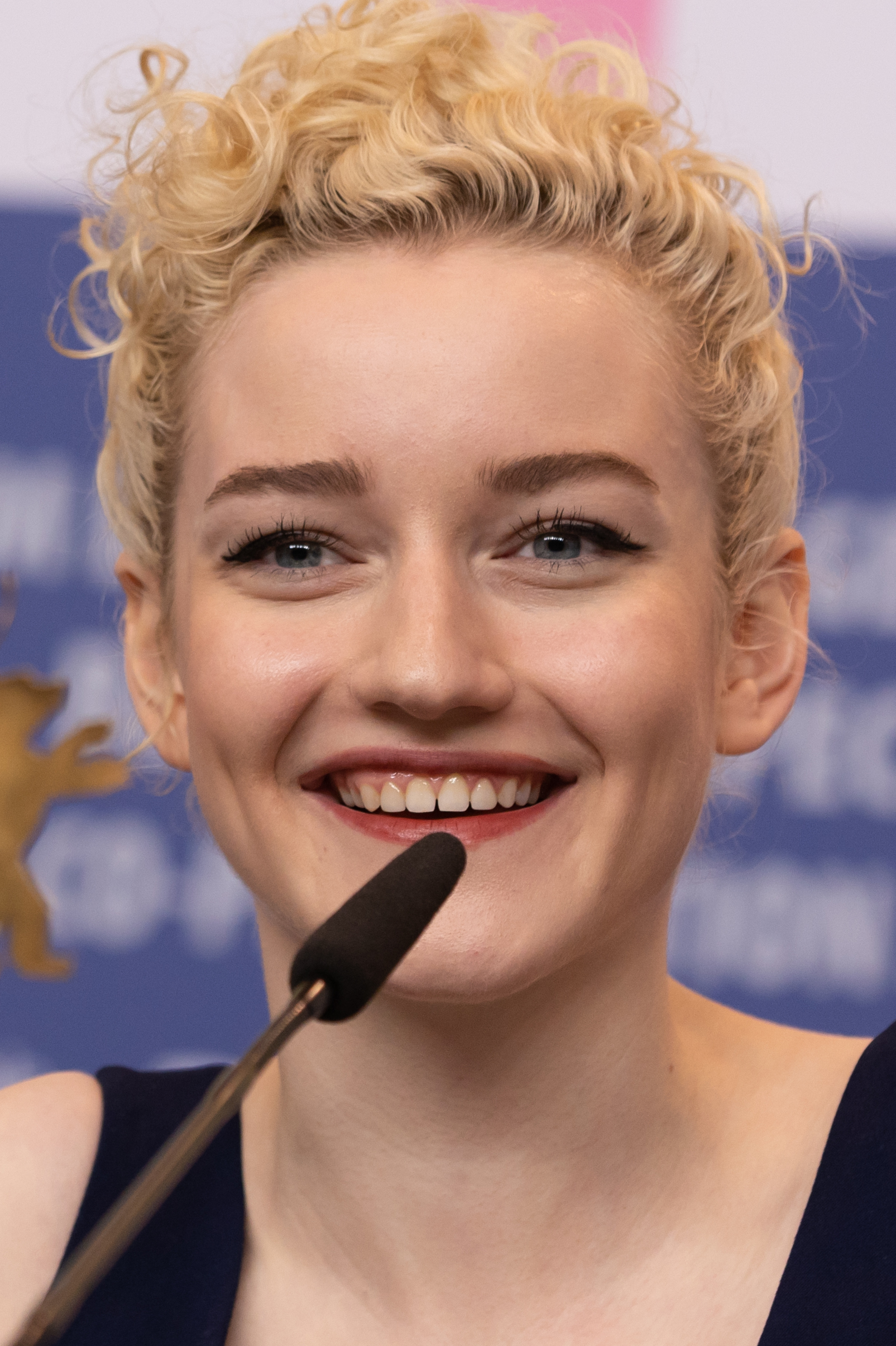
Julia Garner, Best Supporting Actress in a Television Series – Musical-Comedy or Drama winner

Paul Walter Hauser, Best Supporting Actor in a Limited Series, Anthology Series, or Motion Picture Made for Television winner

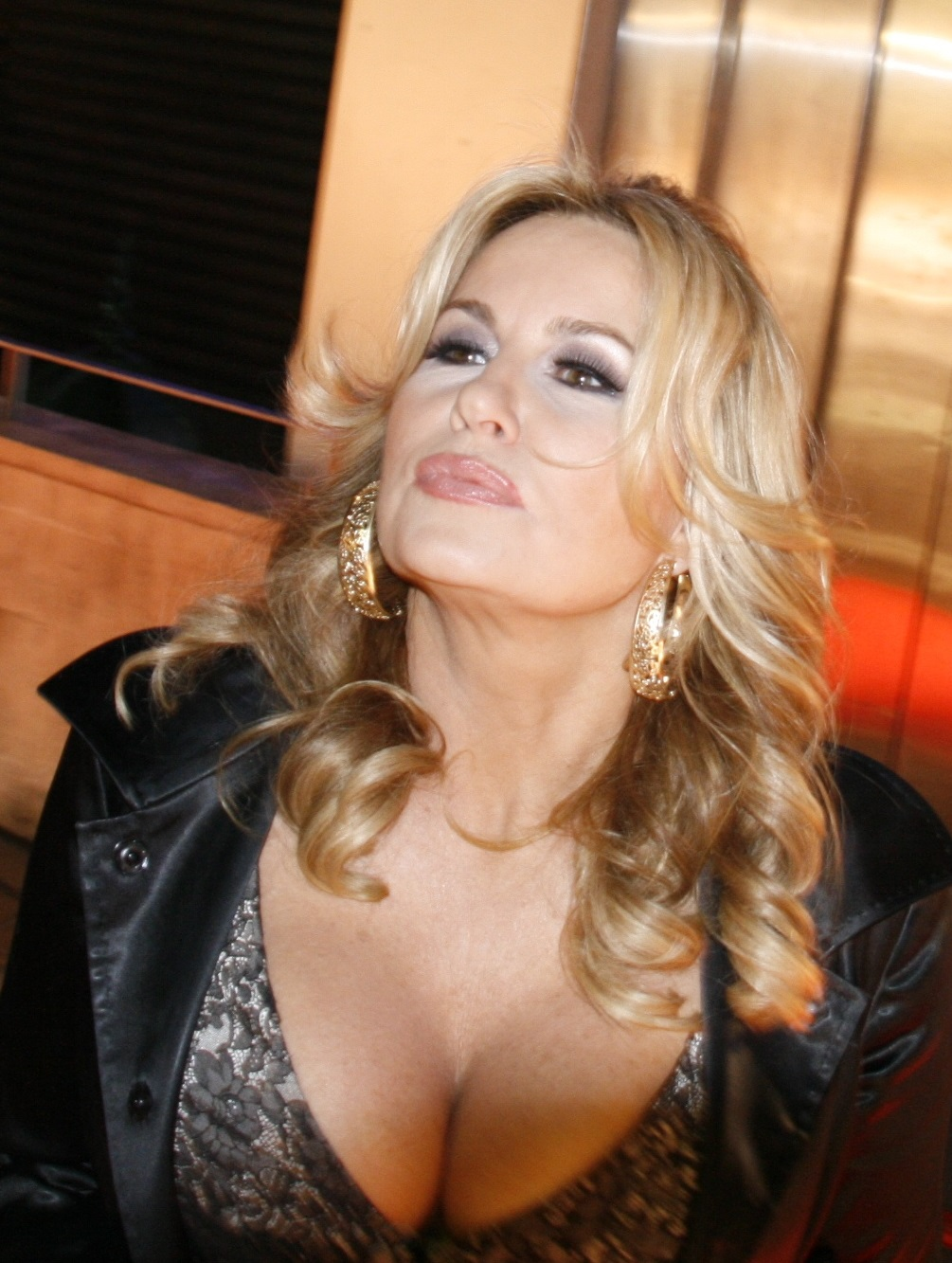
Jennifer Coolidge, Best Supporting Actress in a Limited Series, Anthology Series, or Motion Picture Made for Television winner

=== Film ===
Best Motion Picture
| Drama | Musical or Comedy |
|---|---|
| The Fabelmans; Avatar: The Way of Water; Elvis; Tár; Top Gun: Maverick | The Banshees of Inisherin; Babylon; Everything Everywhere All at Once; Glass Onion: A Knives Out Mystery; Triangle of Sadness |
| Animated | Non-English Language |
| Guillermo del Toro's Pinocchio; Inu-Oh; Marcel the Shell with Shoes On; Puss in Boots: The Last Wish; Turning Red | Argentina, 1985 (Argentina); All Quiet on the Western Front (Germany); Close (Belgium); Decision to Leave (South Korea); RRR (India) |
Best Performance in a Motion Picture – Drama
| Actor | Actress |
| Austin Butler – Elvis as Elvis Presley; Brendan Fraser – The Whale as Charlie; Hugh Jackman – The Son as Peter Miller; Bill Nighy – Living as Mr. Rodney Williams; Jeremy Pope – The Inspection as Ellis French | Cate Blanchett – Tár as Lydia Tár; Olivia Colman – Empire of Light as Hilary Small; Viola Davis – The Woman King as General Nanisca; Ana de Armas – Blonde as Norma Jeane; Michelle Williams – The Fabelmans as Mitzi Fabelman |
Best Performance in a Motion Picture – Musical or Comedy
| Actor | Actress |
| Colin Farrell – The Banshees of Inisherin as Pádraic Súilleabháin; Diego Calva – Babylon as Manuel "Manny" Torres; Daniel Craig – Glass Onion: A Knives Out Mystery as Detective Benoit Blanc; Adam Driver – White Noise as Jack Gladney; Ralph Fiennes – The Menu as Chef Slowik | Michelle Yeoh – Everything Everywhere All at Once as Evelyn Quan Wang; Lesley Manville – Mrs. Harris Goes to Paris as Ada Harris; Margot Robbie – Babylon as Nellie LaRoy; Anya Taylor-Joy – The Menu as Margot; Emma Thompson – Good Luck to You, Leo Grande as Nancy Stokes / Susan Robinson |
Best Supporting Performance in a Motion Picture
| Supporting Actor | Supporting Actress |
| Ke Huy Quan – Everything Everywhere All at Once as Waymond Wang; Brendan Gleeson – The Banshees of Inisherin as Colm Doherty; Barry Keoghan – The Banshees of Inisherin as Dominic Kearney; Brad Pitt – Babylon as Jack Conrad; Eddie Redmayne – The Good Nurse as Charlie Cullen | Angela Bassett – Black Panther: Wakanda Forever as Queen Ramonda; Kerry Condon – The Banshees of Inisherin as Siobhán Súilleabháin; Jamie Lee Curtis – Everything Everywhere All at Once as Deirdre Beaubeirdre; Dolly de Leon – Triangle of Sadness as Abigail; Carey Mulligan – She Said as Megan Twohey |
Other
| Best Director | Best Screenplay |
| Steven Spielberg – The Fabelmans; James Cameron – Avatar: The Way of Water; Daniel Kwan and Daniel Scheinert – Everything Everywhere All at Once; Baz Luhrmann – Elvis; Martin McDonagh – The Banshees of Inisherin | Martin McDonagh – The Banshees of Inisherin; Todd Field – Tár; Daniel Kwan and Daniel Scheinert – Everything Everywhere All at Once; Sarah Polley – Women Talking; Steven Spielberg and Tony Kushner – The Fabelmans |
| Best Original Score | Best Original Song |
| Justin Hurwitz – Babylon; Carter Burwell – The Banshees of Inisherin; Alexandre Desplat – Guillermo del Toro's Pinocchio; Hildur Guðnadóttir – Women Talking; John Williams – The Fabelmans | "Naatu Naatu" (M. M. Keeravani and Chandrabose) – RRR; "Carolina" (Taylor Swift) – Where the Crawdads Sing; "Ciao Papa" (Alexandre Desplat, Roeban Katz, and Guillermo del Toro) – Guillermo del Toro's Pinocchio; "Hold My Hand" (Lady Gaga, BloodPop, and Benjamin Rice) – Top Gun: Maverick; "Lift Me Up" (Tems, Rihanna, Ryan Coogler, and Ludwig Göransson) – Black Panther: Wakanda Forever |

==== Films with multiple nominations ====
The following films received multiple nominations:

| Nominations | Films | Distributor |
|---|---|---|
| 8 | The Banshees of Inisherin | Searchlight Pictures |
| 6 | Everything Everywhere All at Once | A24 |
| 5 | Babylon | Paramount Pictures |
| 5 | The Fabelmans | Universal Pictures |
| 3 | Elvis | Warner Bros. Pictures |
| 3 | Guillermo del Toro's Pinocchio | Netflix |
| 3 | Tár | Focus Features |
| 2 | Avatar: The Way of Water | Walt Disney Studios Motion Pictures |
| 2 | Black Panther: Wakanda Forever | Walt Disney Studios Motion Pictures |
| 2 | The Menu | Searchlight Pictures |
| 2 | Glass Onion: A Knives Out Mystery | Netflix |
| 2 | RRR | Variance Films |
| 2 | Top Gun: Maverick | Paramount Pictures |
| 2 | Triangle of Sadness | Neon |
| 2 | Women Talking | United Artists Releasing |

==== Films with multiple wins ====
The following films received multiple wins:

| Wins | Films | Distributor |
|---|---|---|
| 3 | The Banshees of Inisherin | Searchlight Pictures |
| 2 | Everything Everywhere All at Once | A24 |
| 2 | The Fabelmans | Universal Pictures |

=== Television ===
Best Television Series
| Drama | Musical or Comedy |
|---|---|
| House of the Dragon (HBO); Better Call Saul (AMC); The Crown (Netflix); Ozark (Netflix); Severance (Apple TV+) | Abbott Elementary (ABC); The Bear (FX); Hacks (HBO Max); Only Murders in the Building (Hulu); Wednesday (Netflix) |
Limited Series, Anthology Series, or Motion Picture Made for Television
The White Lotus (HBO); Black Bird (Apple TV+); Dahmer – Monster: The Jeffrey Dahmer Story (Netflix); The Dropout (Hulu); Pam & Tommy (Hulu)
Best Performance in a Television Series – Drama
| Actor | Actress |
| Kevin Costner – Yellowstone (Paramount Network) as John Dutton; Jeff Bridges – The Old Man (FX) as Dan Chase; Diego Luna – Andor (Disney+) as Cassian Andor; Bob Odenkirk – Better Call Saul (AMC) as Jimmy McGill / Saul Goodman / Gene Takavic; Adam Scott – Severance (Apple TV+) as Mark Scout | Zendaya – Euphoria (HBO) as Rue Bennett; Emma D'Arcy – House of the Dragon (HBO) as Princess Rhaenyra Targaryen; Laura Linney – Ozark (Netflix) as Wendy Byrde; Imelda Staunton – The Crown (Netflix) as Queen Elizabeth II; Hilary Swank – Alaska Daily (ABC) as Eileen Fitzgerald |
Best Performance in a Television Series – Musical or Comedy
| Actor | Actress |
| Jeremy Allen White – The Bear (FX) as Carmen "Carmy" Berzatto; Donald Glover – Atlanta (FX) as Earnest "Earn" Marks; Bill Hader – Barry (HBO) as Barry Berkman / Barry Block; Steve Martin – Only Murders in the Building (Hulu) as Charles-Haden Savage; Martin Short – Only Murders in the Building (Hulu) as Oliver Putnam | Quinta Brunson – Abbott Elementary (ABC) as Janine Teagues; Kaley Cuoco – The Flight Attendant (HBO Max) as Cassandra "Cassie" Bowden; Selena Gomez – Only Murders in the Building (Hulu) as Mabel Mora; Jenna Ortega – Wednesday (Netflix) as Wednesday Addams; Jean Smart – Hacks (HBO Max) as Deborah Vance |
Best Performance in a Limited Series, Anthology Series, or Motion Picture Made for Television
| Actor | Actress |
| Evan Peters – Dahmer – Monster: The Jeffrey Dahmer Story (Netflix) as Jeffrey Dahmer; Taron Egerton – Black Bird (Apple TV+) as James "Jimmy" Keene; Colin Firth – The Staircase (HBO Max) as Michael Peterson; Andrew Garfield – Under the Banner of Heaven (FX) as Detective Jeb Pyre; Sebastian Stan – Pam & Tommy (Hulu) as Tommy Lee | Amanda Seyfried – The Dropout (Hulu) as Elizabeth Holmes; Jessica Chastain – George & Tammy (Showtime) as Tammy Wynette; Julia Garner – Inventing Anna (Netflix) as Anna Sorokin / Anna Delvey; Lily James – Pam & Tommy (Hulu) as Pamela Anderson; Julia Roberts – Gaslit (Starz) as Martha Mitchell |
Best Supporting Performance in a Television Series – Musical-Comedy or Drama
| Supporting Actor | Supporting Actress |
| Tyler James Williams – Abbott Elementary (ABC) as Gregory Eddie; John Lithgow – The Old Man (FX) as Harold Harper; Jonathan Pryce – The Crown (Netflix) as Prince Philip, Duke of Edinburgh; John Turturro – Severance (Apple TV+) as Irving Bailiff; Henry Winkler – Barry (HBO) as Gene Cousineau | Julia Garner – Ozark (Netflix) as Ruth Langmore; Elizabeth Debicki – The Crown (Netflix) as Diana, Princess of Wales; Hannah Einbinder – Hacks (HBO Max) as Ava Daniels; Janelle James – Abbott Elementary (ABC) as Ava Coleman; Sheryl Lee Ralph – Abbott Elementary (ABC) as Barbara Howard |
Best Supporting Performance in a Limited Series, Anthology Series, or Motion Picture Made for Television
| Supporting Actor | Supporting Actress |
| Paul Walter Hauser – Black Bird (Apple TV+) as Larry Hall; F. Murray Abraham – The White Lotus (HBO) as Bert Di Grasso; Domhnall Gleeson – The Patient (FX) as Sam Fortner; Richard Jenkins – Dahmer – Monster: The Jeffrey Dahmer Story (Netflix) as Lionel Dahmer; Seth Rogen – Pam & Tommy (Hulu) as Rand Gauthier | Jennifer Coolidge – The White Lotus (HBO) as Tanya McQuoid-Hunt; Claire Danes – Fleishman Is in Trouble (FX) as Rachel Fleishman; Daisy Edgar-Jones – Under the Banner of Heaven (FX) as Brenda Lafferty; Niecy Nash – Dahmer – Monster: The Jeffrey Dahmer Story (Netflix) as Glenda Cleveland; Aubrey Plaza – The White Lotus (HBO) as Harper Spiller |

==== Series with multiple nominations ====
The following television series received multiple nominations:

| Nominations | Series | Distributor |
|---|---|---|
| 5 | Abbott Elementary | ABC |
| 4 | The Crown | Netflix |
| 4 | Dahmer – Monster: The Jeffrey Dahmer Story | Netflix |
| 4 | Only Murders in the Building | Hulu |
| 4 | Pam & Tommy | Hulu |
| 4 | The White Lotus | HBO |
| 3 | Black Bird | Apple TV+ |
| 3 | Hacks | HBO Max |
| 3 | Ozark | Netflix |
| 3 | Severance | Apple TV+ |
| 2 | Barry | HBO |
| 2 | The Bear | FX |
| 2 | Better Call Saul | AMC |
| 2 | The Dropout | Hulu |
| 2 | House of the Dragon | HBO |
| 2 | The Old Man | FX |
| 2 | Under the Banner of Heaven | FX |
| 2 | Wednesday | Netflix |

==== Series with multiple wins ====
The following series received multiple wins:

| Wins | Series | Distributor |
|---|---|---|
| 3 | Abbott Elementary | ABC |
| 2 | The White Lotus | HBO |

=== Cecil B. DeMille Award ===
The Cecil B. DeMille Award is an honorary award for outstanding contributions to the world of entertainment. It is named in honor of its first recipient, director Cecil B. DeMille.

- Eddie Murphy

=== Carol Burnett Award ===
The Carol Burnett Award is an honorary award for outstanding and lasting contributions to television on or off the screen. It is named in honor of its first recipient, actress Carol Burnett.

- Ryan Murphy

== Presenters ==
| Name(s) | Role |
|---|---|
| Jennifer Hudson | Presented the awards for Best Supporting Actor – Motion Picture and Best Supporting Actress – Motion Picture |
| Jennifer Coolidge | Presented the award for Best Supporting Actor in a Television Series – Musical-Comedy or Drama |
| Jenna Ortega | Presented the awards for Best Original Score and Best Original Song |
| Niecy Nash | Presented the awards for Best Actor – Television Series Musical or Comedy and Best Actress – Television Series Musical or Comedy |
| Ana de Armas | Presented the awards for Best Actor – Motion Picture Musical or Comedy and Best Actress – Motion Picture Musical or Comedy |
| Claire Danes | Presented the award for Best Motion Picture – Animated |
| Letitia Wright | Presented award for Best Actor – Motion Picture Drama |
| Glen Powell; Jay Ellis | Presented the awards for Best Actress – Television Series Drama and Best Supporting Actress in a Television Series – Musical-Comedy or Drama |
| Billy Porter | Presented the Carol Burnett Award to honoree Ryan Murphy |
| Henry Golding | Presented the award for Best Motion Picture – Non-English Language |
| Sean Penn | Presented Ukraine President Volodymyr Zelenskyy's telecast |
| Hilary Swank | Presented the award for Best Screenplay – Motion Picture |
| Colman Domingo | Presented the award for Best Director – Motion Picture |
| Nicole Byer; Ana Gasteyer | Presented the awards for Best Supporting Actor – Limited Series, Anthology Series, or Motion Picture Made for Television and Best Supporting Actress – Limited Series, Anthology Series, or Motion Picture Made for Television |
| Cole Hauser; Moses Brings Plenty | Presented the awards for Best Actress – Limited Series, Anthology Series, or Motion Picture Made for Television and Best Actor – Limited Series, Anthology Series, or Motion Picture Made for Television |
| Michaela Jaé Rodriguez | Presented the award for Best Limited Series, Anthology Series, or Motion Picture Made for Television |
| Tracy Morgan; Jamie Lee Curtis | Presented the Cecil B. DeMille Award to honoree Eddie Murphy |
| Regina Hall | Presented the awards for Best Actor – Television Series Drama and Best Television Series – Musical or Comedy |
| Natasha Lyonne | Presented the award for Best Television Series – Drama |
| Salma Hayek; Harvey Guillen | Presented the award for Best Motion Picture – Musical or Comedy |
| Quentin Tarantino | Presented the award for Best Motion Picture – Drama |

== See also ==
- 50th Annie Awards
- 95th Academy Awards
- 28th Critics' Choice Awards
- 38th Independent Spirit Awards
- 43rd Golden Raspberry Awards
- 29th Screen Actors Guild Awards
- 76th British Academy Film Awards
