= 29th Screen Actors Guild Awards =

- Description: Outstanding motion picture and primetime television performances
- Date: February 26, 2023
- Location: Fairmont Century Plaza, Century City, California
- Country: United States
- Presented by: SAG-AFTRA

Highlights
- Most awards: Film; Everything Everywhere All at Once (4); Television; The White Lotus (2)
- Most nominations: Film; The Banshees of Inisherin (5); Everything Everywhere All at Once (5); Television; Ozark (4)
- Website: www.sagawards.org

Television/radio coverage
- Network: YouTube (through @Netflix)
- Runtime: 2 hours, 14 minutes

The 29th Annual Screen Actors Guild Awards, honoring the best achievements in film and television performances for the year 2022, were presented on February 26, 2023, at the Fairmont Century Plaza in Century City, California. The ceremony streamed live on Netflix's YouTube channel, starting at 8:00 p.m. EST / 5:00 p.m. PST. The nominees were announced on January 11, 2023, by Ashley Park and Haley Lu Richardson via Instagram Live.

In May 2022, it was confirmed that the ceremony would no longer air on TNT and TBS (the ceremony had aired on TNT since 1998 and had been also broadcast on TBS since 2006); a spokesperson insisted that finding a new home for the ceremony "is not unusual and has occurred several times over the history of the SAG Awards. This is no different". The day of the nominations announcement, it was confirmed that the ceremony would stream live on Netflix's YouTube channel.

The Banshees of Inisherin and Everything Everywhere All at Once both received five nominations, tying the record for the most nominations in SAG Awards history with Shakespeare in Love (1998), Chicago (2002), and Doubt (2008). Everything Everywhere All at Once ultimately won the most awards of the ceremony with four wins, the most for any film in SAG Awards history, with Michelle Yeoh and Ke Huy Quan both becoming the first Asian actors to win for individual categories: Outstanding Performance by a Female Actor in a Leading Role and Outstanding Performance by a Male Actor in a Supporting Role, respectively.

Sally Field was announced as the 2022 SAG Life Achievement Award recipient on January 17, 2023.

== Winners and nominees ==
- Note: Winners are listed first and highlighted in **boldface**.

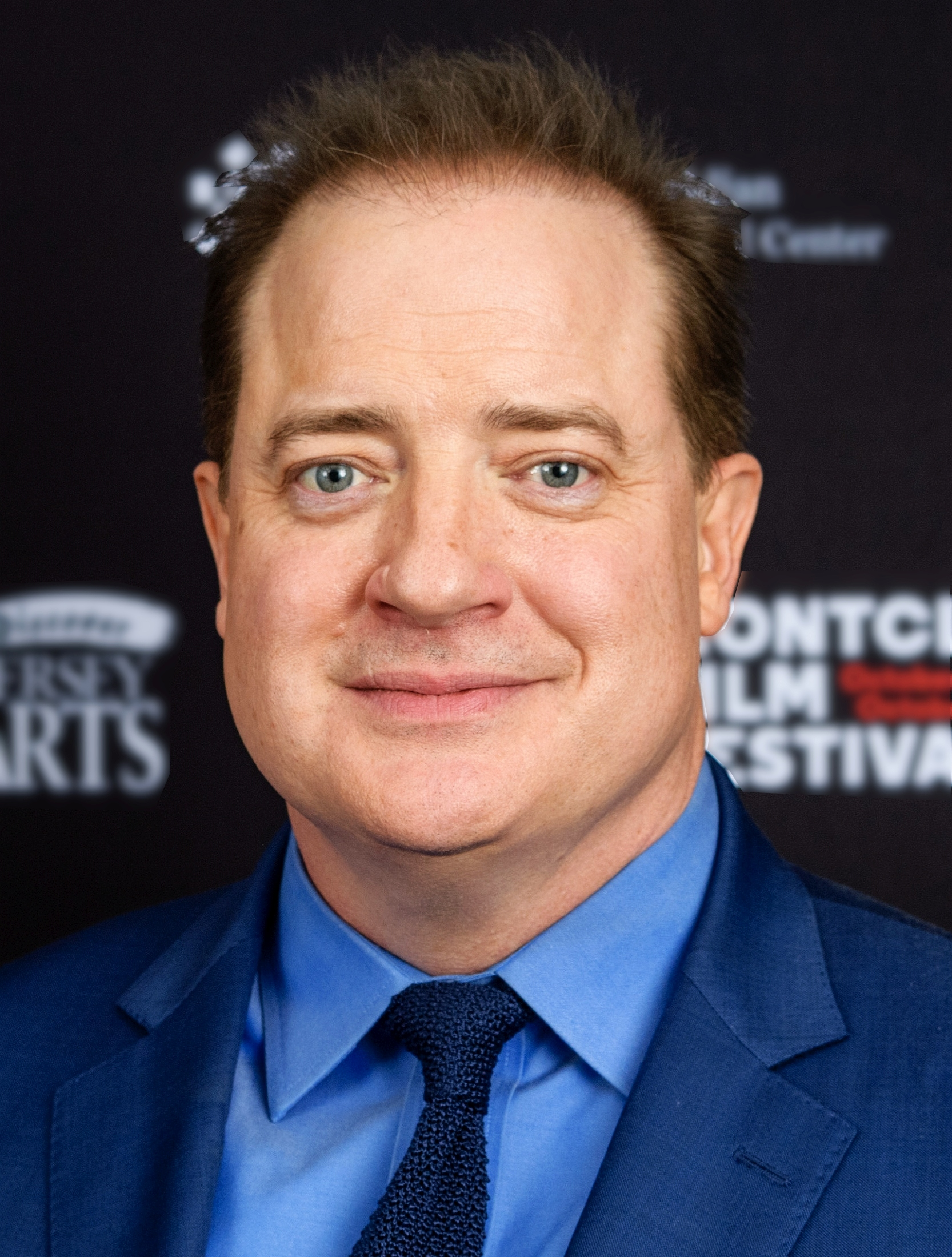
Brendan Fraser, Outstanding Performance by a Male Actor in a Leading Role winner

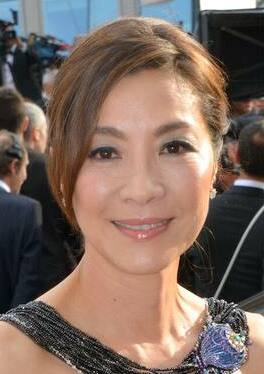
Michelle Yeoh, Outstanding Performance by a Female Actor in a Leading Role winner

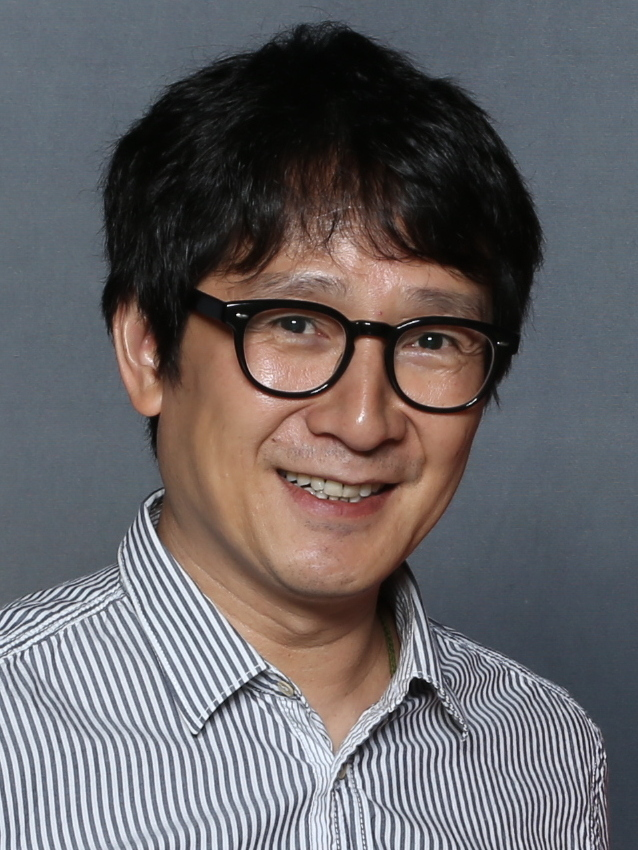
Ke Huy Quan, Outstanding Performance by a Male Actor in a Supporting Role winner

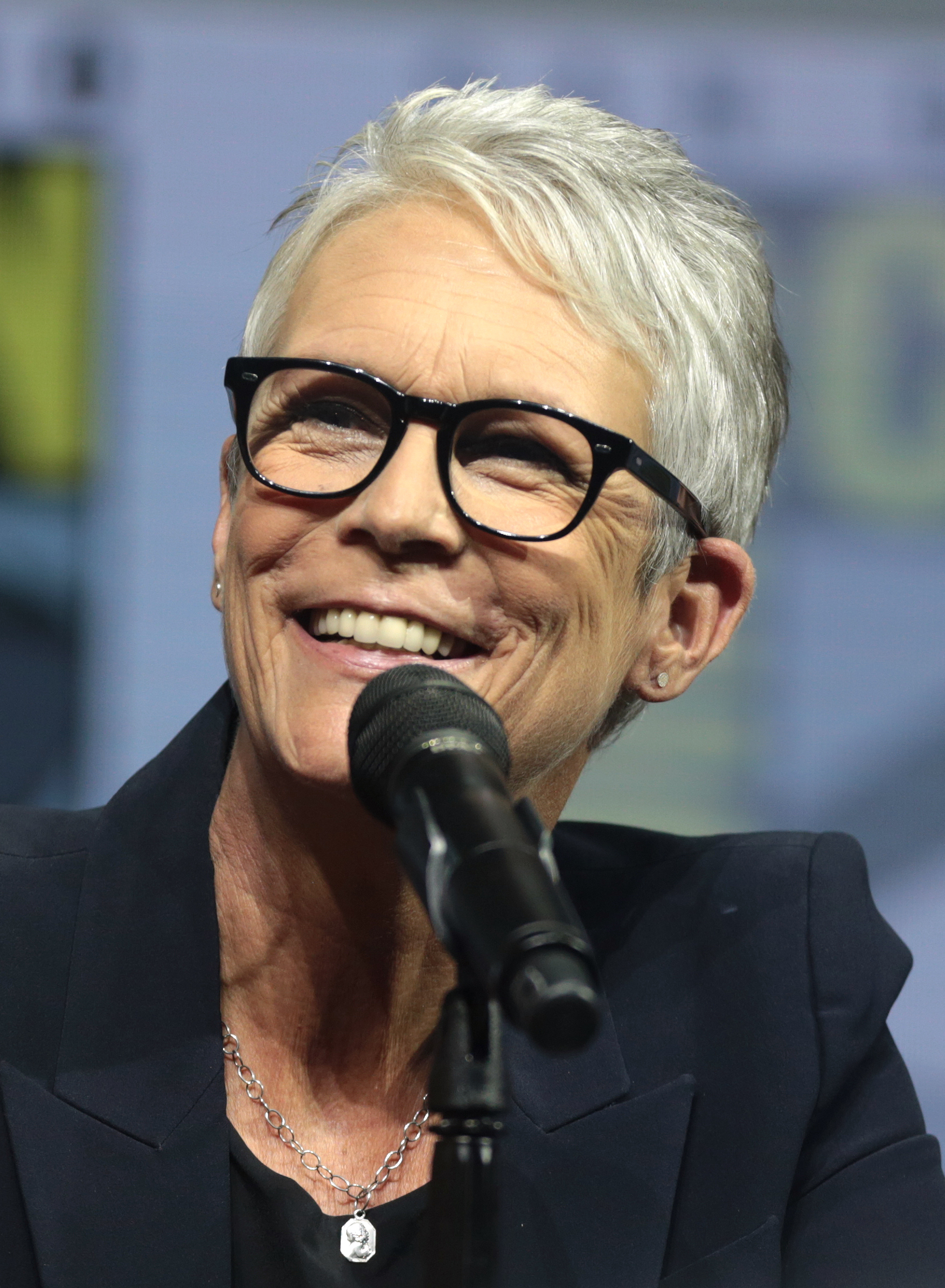
Jamie Lee Curtis, Outstanding Performance by a Female Actor in a Supporting Role winner

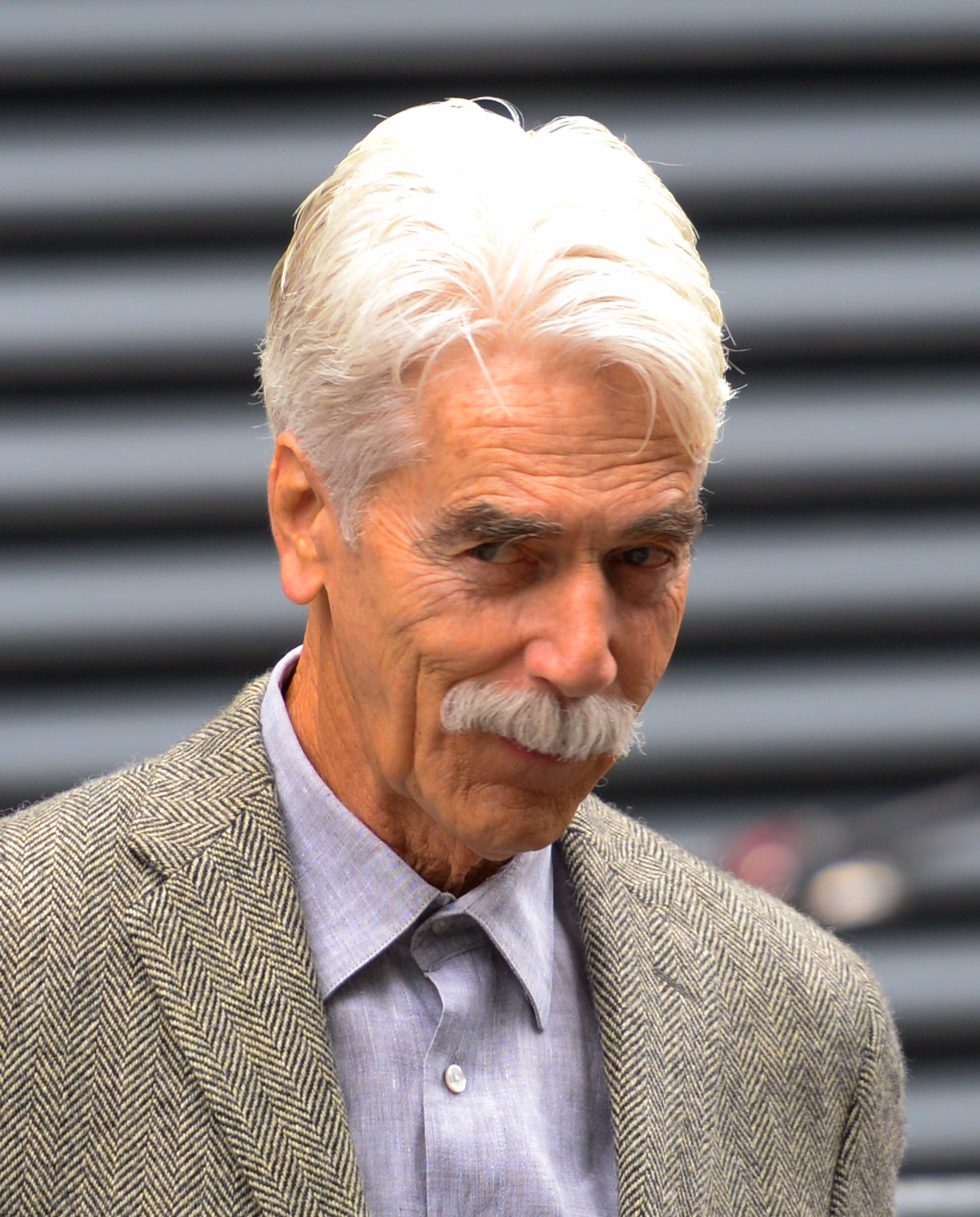
Sam Elliott, Outstanding Performance by a Male Actor in a Television Movie or Limited Series winner

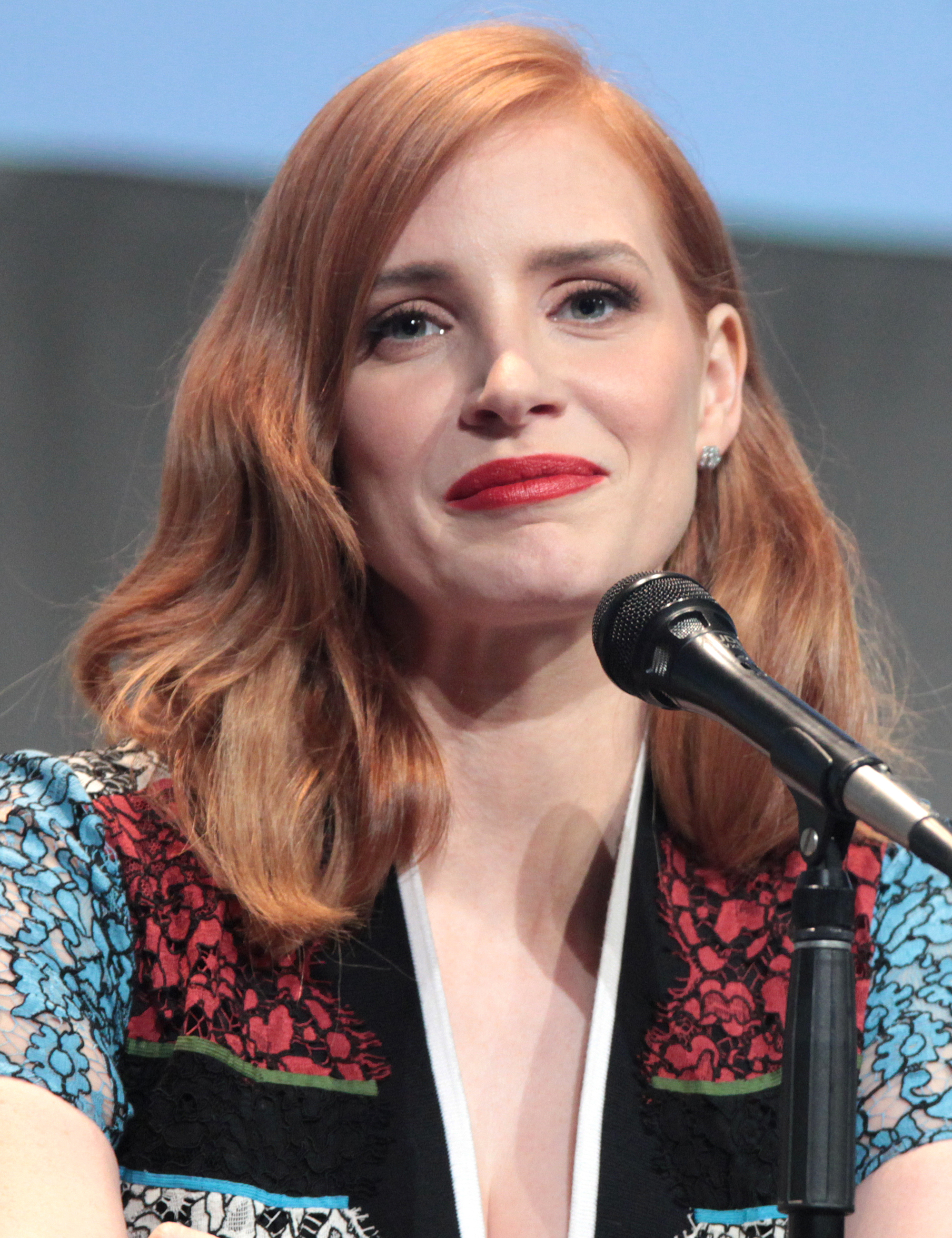
Jessica Chastain, Outstanding Performance by a Female Actor in a Television Movie or Limited Series winner

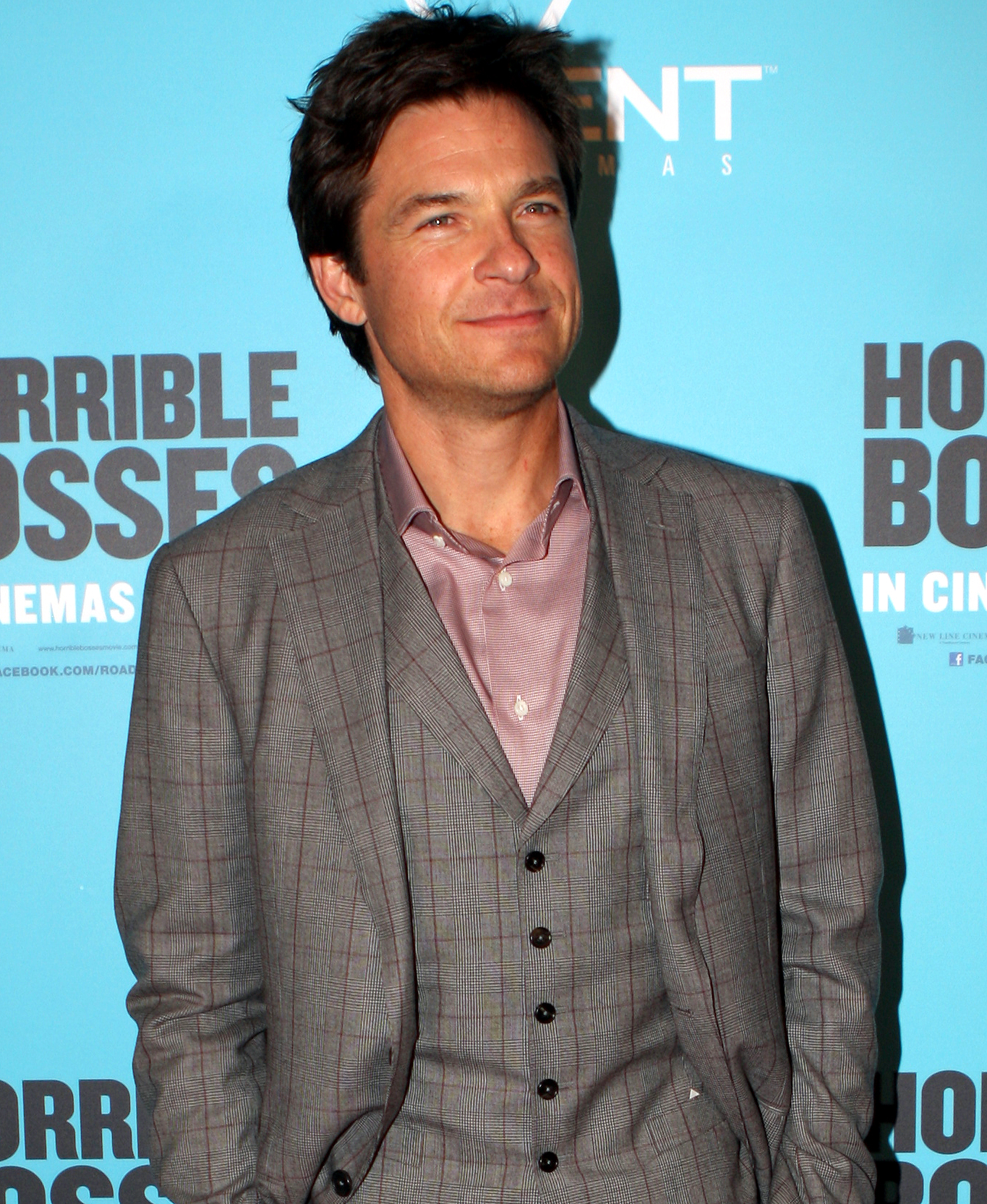
Jason Bateman, Outstanding Performance by a Male Actor in a Drama Series winner

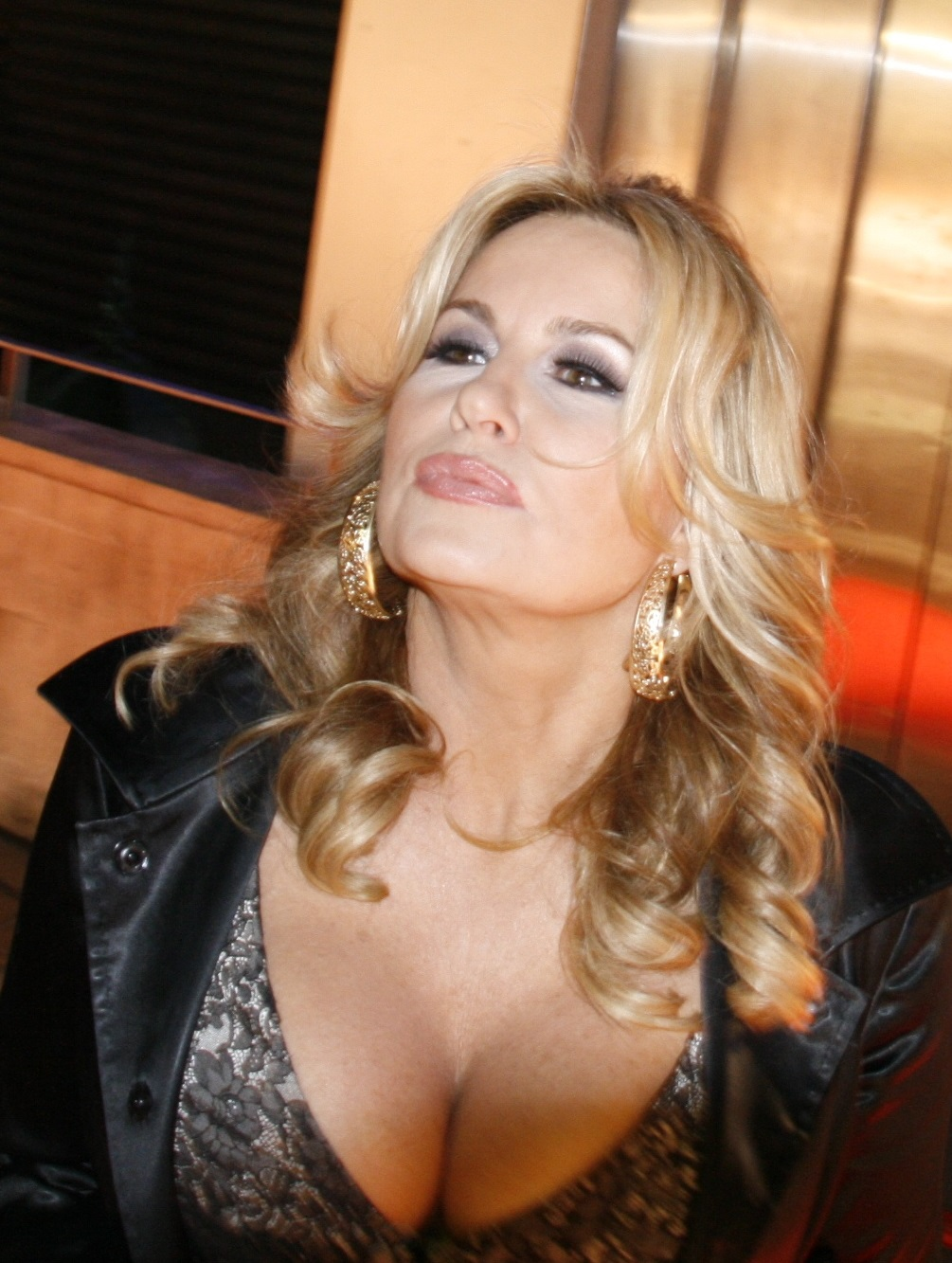
Jennifer Coolidge, Outstanding Performance by a Female Actor in a Drama Series winner

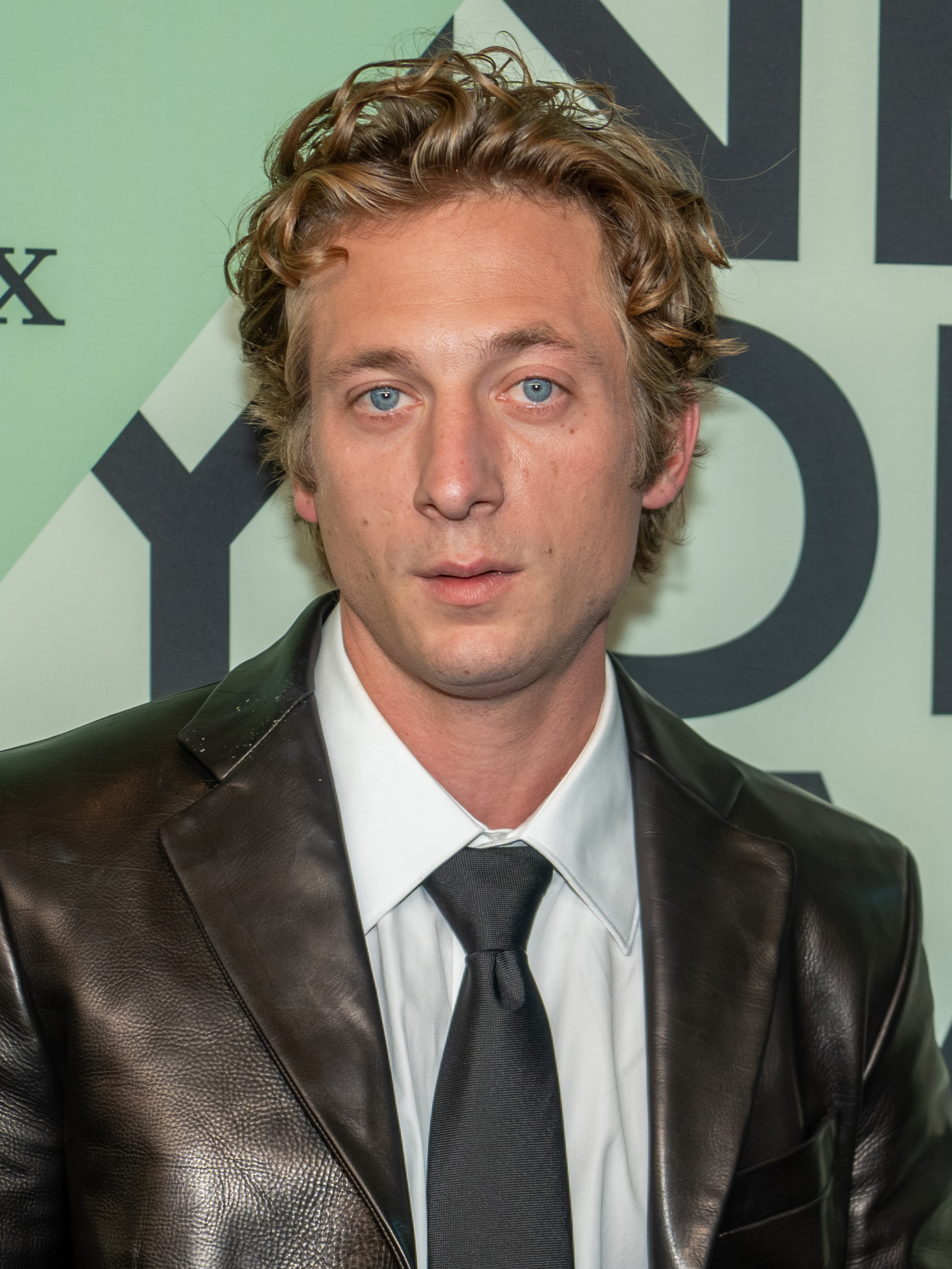
Jeremy Allen White, Outstanding Performance by a Male Actor in a Comedy Series winner

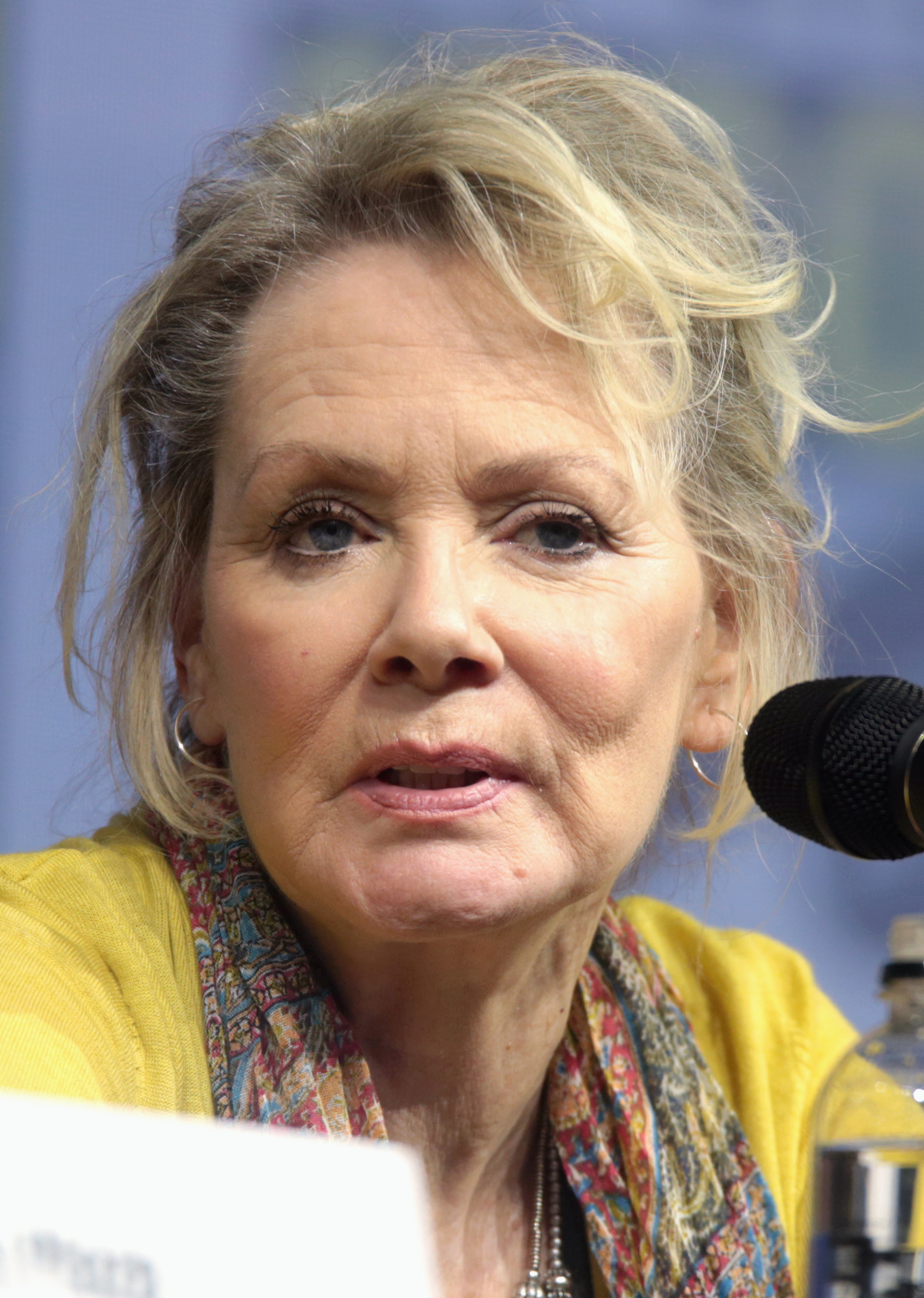
Jean Smart, Outstanding Performance by a Female Actor in a Comedy Series winner

=== Film ===
**Outstanding Performance by a Male Actor in a Leading Role**: **Brendan Fraser – The Whale as Charlie**; Austin Butler – Elvis as Elvis Presley; Colin Farrell – The Banshees of Inisherin as Pádraic Súilleabháin; Bill Nighy – Living as Mr. Williams; Adam Sandler – Hustle as Stanley Sugerman	**Outstanding Performance by a Female Actor in a Leading Role**: **Michelle Yeoh – Everything Everywhere All at Once as Evelyn Quan Wang**; Cate Blanchett – Tár as Lydia Tár; Viola Davis – The Woman King as General Nanisca; Ana de Armas – Blonde as Norma Jeane Mortensen / Marilyn Monroe; Danielle Deadwyler – Till as Mamie Till-Mobley
**Outstanding Performance by a Male Actor in a Supporting Role**: **Ke Huy Quan – Everything Everywhere All at Once as Waymond Wang**; Paul Dano – The Fabelmans as Burt Fabelman; Brendan Gleeson – The Banshees of Inisherin as Colm Doherty; Barry Keoghan – The Banshees of Inisherin as Dominic Kearney; Eddie Redmayne – The Good Nurse as Charlie Cullen	**Outstanding Performance by a Female Actor in a Supporting Role**: **Jamie Lee Curtis – Everything Everywhere All at Once as Deirdre Beaubeirdre**; Angela Bassett – Black Panther: Wakanda Forever as Queen Ramonda; Hong Chau – The Whale as Liz; Kerry Condon – The Banshees of Inisherin as Siobhán Súilleabháin; Stephanie Hsu – Everything Everywhere All at Once as Joy Wang / Jobu Tupaki
**Outstanding Performance by a Cast in a Motion Picture**: **Everything Everywhere All at Once – Jamie Lee Curtis, James Hong, Stephanie Hsu, Ke Huy Quan, Harry Shum Jr., Jenny Slate, and Michelle Yeoh**; Babylon – Jovan Adepo, P. J. Byrne, Diego Calva, Lukas Haas, Olivia Hamilton, Li Jun Li, Tobey Maguire, Max Minghella, Brad Pitt, Margot Robbie, Rory Scovel, Jean Smart, and Katherine Waterston; The Banshees of Inisherin – Kerry Condon, Colin Farrell, Brendan Gleeson, and Barry Keoghan; The Fabelmans – Jeannie Berlin, Paul Dano, Judd Hirsch, Gabriel LaBelle, David Lynch, Seth Rogen, and Michelle Williams; Women Talking – Jessie Buckley, Claire Foy, Kate Hallett, Judith Ivey, Rooney Mara, Sheila McCarthy, Frances McDormand, Michelle McLeod, Liv McNeil, Ben Whishaw, and August Winter
**Outstanding Performance by a Stunt Ensemble in a Motion Picture**: **Top Gun: Maverick**; Avatar: The Way of Water; The Batman; Black Panther: Wakanda Forever; The Woman King

=== Television ===
**Outstanding Performance by a Male Actor in a Television Movie or Limited Series**: **Sam Elliott – 1883 (Paramount+) as Shea Brennan**; Steve Carell – The Patient (FX on Hulu) as Alan Strauss; Taron Egerton – Black Bird (Apple TV+) as James "Jimmy" Keene; Paul Walter Hauser – Black Bird (Apple TV+) as Lawrence "Larry" Hall; Evan Peters – Dahmer – Monster: The Jeffrey Dahmer Story (Netflix) as Jeffrey Dahmer	**Outstanding Performance by a Female Actor in a Television Movie or Limited Series**: **Jessica Chastain – George & Tammy (Showtime) as Tammy Wynette**; Emily Blunt – The English (Prime Video) as Cornelia Locke; Julia Garner – Inventing Anna (Netflix) as Anna Sorokin / Anna Delvey; Niecy Nash-Betts – Dahmer – Monster: The Jeffrey Dahmer Story (Netflix) as Glenda Cleveland; Amanda Seyfried – The Dropout (Hulu) as Elizabeth Holmes
**Outstanding Performance by a Male Actor in a Drama Series**: **Jason Bateman – Ozark (Netflix) as Marty Byrde**; Jonathan Banks – Better Call Saul (AMC) as Mike Ehrmantraut; Jeff Bridges – The Old Man (FX) as Dan Chase; Bob Odenkirk – Better Call Saul (AMC) as Jimmy McGill / Saul Goodman / Gene Takavic; Adam Scott – Severance (Apple TV+) as Mark Scout / Mark S.	**Outstanding Performance by a Female Actor in a Drama Series**: **Jennifer Coolidge – The White Lotus (HBO) as Tanya McQuoid-Hunt**; Elizabeth Debicki – The Crown (Netflix) as Diana, Princess of Wales; Julia Garner – Ozark (Netflix) as Ruth Langmore; Laura Linney – Ozark (Netflix) as Wendy Byrde; Zendaya – Euphoria (HBO) as Rue Bennett
**Outstanding Performance by a Male Actor in a Comedy Series**: **Jeremy Allen White – The Bear (FX on Hulu) as Carmen "Carmy" Berzatto**; Anthony Carrigan – Barry (HBO) as NoHo Hank; Bill Hader – Barry (HBO) as Barry Berkman / Barry Block; Steve Martin – Only Murders in the Building (Hulu) as Charles-Haden Savage; Martin Short – Only Murders in the Building (Hulu) as Oliver Putnam	**Outstanding Performance by a Female Actor in a Comedy Series**: **Jean Smart – Hacks (HBO Max) as Deborah Vance**; Christina Applegate – Dead to Me (Netflix) as Jen Harding; Rachel Brosnahan – The Marvelous Mrs. Maisel (Prime Video) as Miriam "Midge" Maisel; Quinta Brunson – Abbott Elementary (ABC) as Janine Teagues; Jenna Ortega – Wednesday (Netflix) as Wednesday Addams
**Outstanding Performance by an Ensemble in a Drama Series**: **The White Lotus (HBO) – F. Murray Abraham, Paolo Camilli, Jennifer Coolidge, Adam DiMarco, Meghann Fahy, Federico Ferrante, Bruno Gouery, Beatrice Grannò, Jon Gries, Tom Hollander, Sabrina Impacciatore, Michael Imperioli, Theo James, Aubrey Plaza, Haley Lu Richardson, Eleonora Romandini, Federico Scribani, Will Sharpe, Simona Tabasco, Leo Woodall, and Francesco Zecca**; Better Call Saul (AMC) – Jonathan Banks, Ed Begley Jr., Tony Dalton, Giancarlo Esposito, Patrick Fabian, Bob Odenkirk, and Rhea Seehorn; The Crown (Netflix) – Elizabeth Debicki, Claudia Harrison, Andrew Havill, Lesley Manville, Jonny Lee Miller, Flora Montgomery, James Murray, Jonathan Pryce, Ed Sayer, Imelda Staunton, Marcia Warren, Dominic West, and Olivia Williams; Ozark (Netflix) – Jason Bateman, Nelson Bonilla, Jessica Frances Dukes, Lisa Emery, Skylar Gaertner, Julia Garner, Alfonso Herrera, Sofia Hublitz, Kevin L. Johnson, Katrina Lenk, Laura Linney, Adam Rothenberg, Felix Solis, Charlie Tahan, Richard Thomas, and Damian Young; Severance (Apple TV+) – Patricia Arquette, Michael Chernus, Zach Cherry, Michael Cumpsty, Dichen Lachman, Britt Lower, Adam Scott, Tramell Tillman, Jen Tullock, John Turturro, and Christopher Walken
**Outstanding Performance by an Ensemble in a Comedy Series**: **Abbott Elementary (ABC) – Quinta Brunson, William Stanford Davis, Janelle James, Chris Perfetti, Sheryl Lee Ralph, Lisa Ann Walter, and Tyler James Williams**; Barry (HBO) – Sarah Burns, D'Arcy Carden, Anthony Carrigan, Turhan Troy Caylak, Sarah Goldberg, Nick Gracer, Bill Hader, Jessy Hodges, Michael Irby, Gary Kraus, Stephen Root, and Henry Winkler; The Bear (FX on Hulu) – Lionel Boyce, Liza Colón-Zayas, Ayo Edebiri, Abby Elliott, Edwin Lee Gibson, Corey Hendrix, Matty Matheson, Ebon Moss-Bachrach, and Jeremy Allen White; Hacks (HBO Max) – Carl Clemons-Hopkins, Paul W. Downs, Hannah Einbinder, Mark Indelicato, Jean Smart, and Megan Stalter; Only Murders in the Building (Hulu) – Michael Cyril Creighton, Cara Delevingne, Selena Gomez, Jayne Houdyshell, Steve Martin, Martin Short, and Adina Verson
**Outstanding Performance by a Stunt Ensemble in a Television Series**: **Stranger Things (Netflix)**; Andor (Disney+); The Boys (Prime Video); House of the Dragon (HBO); The Lord of the Rings: The Rings of Power (Prime Video)

=== Screen Actors Guild Life Achievement Award ===
- Sally Field

== Multiple nominations ==
=== Film ===
Nominations	Film
5	The Banshees of Inisherin
5	Everything Everywhere All at Once
2	Black Panther: Wakanda Forever
2	The Fabelmans
2	The Whale
2	The Woman King

=== Television ===
Nominations	Program
4	Ozark
3	Barry
3	Better Call Saul
3	Only Murders in the Building
2	Abbott Elementary
2	The Bear
2	Black Bird
2	The Crown
2	Dahmer – Monster: The Jeffrey Dahmer Story
2	Hacks
2	Severance
2	The White Lotus

== Multiple wins ==
=== Film ===
Wins	Film
4	Everything Everywhere All at Once

=== Television ===
Wins	Program
2	The White Lotus

== In Memoriam ==
The segment, introduced by Don Cheadle, honored the following who died in 2022 and early 2023:

- Leslie Jordan
- Louise Fletcher
- David Warner
- Liz Sheridan
- Irene Cara
- Ray Liotta
- Paul Sorvino
- Cindy Williams
- William Hurt
- Lisa Loring
- Fred Ward
- Kathryn Hays
- Tony Dow
- Marsha Hunt
- L. Q. Jones
- Annie Wersching
- Tim Considine
- Ralph Ahn
- Rebecca Balding
- F.J. O'Neil
- Mitchell Ryan
- Bo Hopkins
- Yoshio Yoda
- Sandra Seacat
- Clu Gulager
- Andrew Prine
- Lance Kerwin
- Stella Stevens
- Charles Kimbrough
- Robert Morse
- Gina Lollobrigida
- Roger E. Mosley
- Ned Eisenberg
- Nehemiah Persoff
- Philip Baker Hall
- Melinda Dillon
- David Birney
- Larry Storch
- Henry Silva
- Bruce MacVittie
- John Aylward
- Bob McGrath
- Emilio Delgado
- Anne Heche
- Tony Sirico
- John Aniston
- Nichelle Nichols
- Lenny Von Dohlen
- Ron Masak
- Conrad Janis
- Ted White
- Mark Miller
- Clarence Gilyard Jr.
- Barbara Bosson
- Adam Rich
- Gregory Itzin
- Eileen Ryan
- Austin Majors
- Cody Longo
- Olivia Newton-John
- Kevin Conroy
- Pat Carroll
- Gilbert Gottfried
- Estelle Harris
- Stuart Margolin
- Raquel Welch
- Robbie Coltrane
- Richard Belzer
- Kirstie Alley
- Mary Alice
- James Caan
- Angela Lansbury

== Presenters ==
The awards and segments were presented by the following individuals:

Presenters at the ceremony
Name(s)	Role
Quinta Brunson; Janelle James	Presented the highlights of nominated acting performances
Paul Mescal; Zendaya	Presented Outstanding Performance by a Female Actor in a Miniseries or Television Movie
Stephanie Hsu; Ke Huy Quan; Michelle Yeoh	Presented the film Everything Everywhere All at Once on the Outstanding Performance by a Cast in a Motion Picture segment
Jenna Ortega; Aubrey Plaza	Presented Outstanding Performance by a Male Actor in a Miniseries or Television Movie
Amy Poehler; Adam Scott	Presented Outstanding Performance by a Female Actor in a Comedy Series
Paul Dano; Gabriel LaBelle; Michelle Williams	Presented the film The Fabelmans on the Outstanding Performance by a Cast in a Motion Picture segment
Ashley Park; Haley Lu Richardson	Presented Outstanding Performance by a Male Actor in a Comedy Series
Eugene Levy	Presented Outstanding Performance by an Ensemble in a Comedy Series
Jason Bateman; Emily Blunt	Presented Outstanding Performance by a Female Actor in a Supporting Role
Jessie Buckley; Claire Foy; Rooney Mara	Presented the film Women Talking on the Outstanding Performance by a Cast in a Motion Picture segment
Orlando Bloom	Presented Outstanding Performance by a Male Actor in a Supporting Role
Jovan Adepo; Diego Calva; Li Jun Li	Presented the film Babylon on the Outstanding Performance by a Cast in a Motion Picture segment
Andrew Garfield	Presented the Screen Actors Guild Life Achievement Award for Sally Field
Ariana DeBose; Diego Luna	Presented Outstanding Performance by a Female Actor in a Drama Series
Antonia Gentry; Caleb McLaughlin	Presented Outstanding Performance by a Male Actor in a Drama Series
James Marsden; Jenny Slate	Presented Outstanding Performance by an Ensemble in a Drama Series
Don Cheadle	Presented the In Memoriam tribute
Colin Farrell; Brendan Gleeson	Presented the film The Banshees of Inisherin on the Outstanding Performance by a Cast in a Motion Picture segment
Jeff Bridges	Presented Outstanding Performance by a Female Actor in a Leading Role
Jessica Chastain	Presented Outstanding Performance by a Male Actor in a Leading Role
Mark Wahlberg	Presented Outstanding Performance by a Cast in a Motion Picture
