= Black Bird (miniseries) =

American television series

- Genre: True crime; Drama
- Based on: In with the Devil: A Fallen Hero, a Serial Killer, and a Dangerous Bargain for Redemption by: James Keene; Hillel Levin
- Developed by: Dennis Lehane
- Starring: Taron Egerton; Paul Walter Hauser; Sepideh Moafi; Greg Kinnear; Ray Liotta
- Music by: Mogwai
- Country of origin: United States
- Original language: English
- No. of episodes: 6

Production
- Executive producers: Taron Egerton; Jimmy Keene; Michaël R. Roskam; Dan Friedkin; Ryan Friedkin; Kary Antholis; Scott Lambert; Alexandra Milchan; Bradley Thomas; Richard Plepler; Dennis Lehane
- Cinematography: Natalie Kingston
- Editors: Rob Bonz; Jonathan Alberts
- Running time: 54–60 minutes
- Production companies: EMJAG Productions; Imperative Entertainment; Eden Productions; Crime Story; Hans Bubby

Original release
- Network: Apple TV+
- Release: July 8 – August 5, 2022

Black Bird is a 2022 American true crime drama miniseries developed by Dennis Lehane, based on the 2010 autobiographical novel In with the Devil: a Fallen Hero, a Serial Killer, and a Dangerous Bargain for Redemption by Jimmy Keene with Hillel Levin. The six-episode miniseries premiered on July 8, 2022, on Apple TV+. The series received critical acclaim with particular praise toward Keene's original story and its cast.

== Plot ==
James "Jimmy" Keene has evolved into a life of crime until he is arrested as part of a wider sting. Once a promising young football star with several scholarships lined up, he became involved in a narcotics business and decided to stay in the Chicago area to continue his education and sports and to stay close to his thriving business. He accepted a plea deal he believed to be only two years with an opportunity for parole, as opposed to fighting the charges and risking five. However at trial, Jimmy is sentenced to ten years without parole.

Leveraging his persuasive skills, Jimmy was offered an opportunity for a fully commuted sentence with a clean record and no conditions by federal authorities. In exchange, Jimmy would have to transfer to a maximum-security facility for the criminally insane to befriend a suspected serial killer Larry Hall. His task there would be to elicit a confession from Hall regarding the burial sites of several young female victims before Hall's legal appeal is decided.

== Cast ==
=== Main ===
- Taron Egerton as James "Jimmy" Keene, accused of drug and weapon conspiracy, facing a 10-year prison sentence without a chance for parole
- Paul Walter Hauser as Larry Hall, a convicted serial killer and rapist accused of killing 14 women
- Sepideh Moafi as Lauren McCauley, an FBI agent and Jimmy's handler
- Greg Kinnear as Brian Miller, a police detective from Vermillion County, Illinois, investigating Larry's missing murder victims
- Ray Liotta as James "Big Jim" Keene, Jimmy's father

=== Recurring ===
- Robyn Malcolm as Sammy Keene
- Jake McLaughlin as Gary Hall, Larry's brother
- Robert Wisdom as Edmund Beaumont, McCauley's superior at the FBI
- Cullen Moss as Russ Aborn
- Tony Amendola as Vincent "The Chin" Gigante, the mob boss of the Genovese family
- Melanie Nicholls-King as Dr. Amelia Hackett
- Christopher B. Duncan as Dr. Aaron Zicherman, a prison psychiatrist
- Joe Williamson as CO Carter, a prison guard who determines Jimmy is not who he claims to be
- Laney Stiebing as Jessica Roach
- Cecilia Leal as Rochelle
- Cade Tropeano as young Larry Hall
- Blue Clarke as young Jimmy Keene
- Kwajalyn Brown as Judge Diane Wood

== Episodes ==
No.	Title	Directed by	Teleplay by	Original release date
1	"Pilot"	Michaël R. Roskam	Dennis Lehane	July 8, 2022
In 1993, Wabash resident Larry Hall is brought in for questioning as a suspect in the murder of an underage girl. Local police describe him as a harmless serial confessor, but detective Brian Miller manages to coax out of him that he has dreams about murdering women. In 1996, James "Jimmy" Keene, is arrested and sentenced to ten years in prison without parole for a drug charge. Seven months into his sentence, he is approached by FBI agent Lauren McCauley and offered a deal for a clean start with lesser sentence and completely clean record: he will transfer into a facility for the criminally insane in Springfield, befriend Larry, and convince him to admit to killing fourteen women, having only been convicted of two murders, which he is trying to get overturned. Jimmy initially rejects the deal, but after his father James has a stroke caused by the stress of his son's incarceration, he starts studying Larry's case file in hopes of being the inmate selected to befriend him.
2	"We Are Coming, Father Abraham"	Michaël R. Roskam	Dennis Lehane	July 8, 2022
Miller gets Larry to confess to a murder, but during the trial, Larry claims that Miller manipulated him and coaxed a false confession, leading to the case going to appellate court. McCauley convinces Jimmy to talk about his troubled childhood and advises him to tap into it when talking to Larry, confirming that he has been approved for the role. He almost backs out moments before he is transferred into the facility, but goes through with it and spends his first day looking for Larry, only to learn that they are in cells right across from each other. McCauley contacts Miller to inform him of her plan against Larry.
3	"Hand to Mouth"	Michaël R. Roskam	Riccardo DiLoreto & Sean K. Smith	July 15, 2022
Jimmy struggles to converse with Larry until he beats up a man who changes the TV from a program Larry was watching, earning his respect. The two talk about sex, where Larry reveals that he does not care about the woman's consent and alludes to having killed victims who threatened to report him. At the same time, a guard realizes Jimmy is James' son when he visits and threatens to expose his identity if he does not come up with $10,000. Jimmy asks James to retrieve a brick of cocaine from one of his houses, but learns that his friend Danny stole it. When McCauley visits Jimmy and offers to pull him out to save him from the guard, he refuses to leave, disturbed by his conversation with Larry and now determined to catch him.
4	"WhatsHerName"	Jim McKay	Teleplay by : Dennis Lehane; Story by : Steve Harris & Dennis Lehane	July 22, 2022
As a child, Larry's gravedigger father would take him to rob graves in the middle of the night, a habit he carried over into adulthood. In the present, Jimmy searches Larry's cell and discovers several disturbing drawings inside pornographic magazines. A violent prison riot sticks them together on cleanup duty, where Larry convinces Jimmy to tell him a story from his childhood, where he attempted to beat up his mother's abusive boyfriend because he believed that was what she wanted and failed miserably. Larry admits that he would subdue women with a rag soaked in starting fluid to get them to stop fighting back against him, and his brother visits to inform him that the police are anticipating his release.
5	"The Place I Lie"	Joe Chappelle	Dennis Lehane	July 29, 2022
The guard cuts off Jimmy's phone calls, preventing him from getting the money, and Jimmy notices the guard telling prisoners what his true "identity" is. Terrified that he may soon be killed, he coaxes Larry into admitting he abducted, raped and murdered an underage girl. At the same time, Larry makes foreboding comments towards his therapist, which she summarizes as him trying to project Jimmy's more confident attitude. McCauley and Miller search for the body of the girl Larry confessed to Jimmy that he murdered, and find that he gave the victim's mountain bike to another underage girl he was attracted to. They bring a photo of the bike to the judge who informs them it is not sufficient evidence to stop the appeal. At night, following Larry’s confession, Jimmy cries in his cell.
6	"You Promised"	Joe Chappelle	Dennis Lehane	August 5, 2022
While Larry draws a map of where all the bodies of his victims are buried, Jimmy snaps and reveals to him that he was sent to get him to confess, causing Larry to have a violent reaction. Larry's therapist has Jimmy put in solitary for upsetting him, where he is forced to try to recreate the map with his own blood after being denied a writing utensil. His FBI contact eventually realizes what is happening and that Jimmy has gotten new evidence to secure Larry Hall's conviction and frees Jimmy, and Larry Hall is denied his appeal. Jimmy is freed and completely cleared and he meets Miller, who personally thanks him. Larry's brother, disturbed after talking to McCauley and Miller, urges his brother to confess to his crimes. Closing titles reveal that Larry confessed to fifteen murders but later recanted, James died of a heart attack five years after Jimmy's release, and Jimmy went on to have a successful business career while still helping law enforcement profile serial killers.

== Production ==
The series was developed by Dennis Lehane, based on the 2010 autobiographical novel In with the Devil: a Fallen Hero, a Serial Killer, and a Dangerous Bargain for Redemption, written by James Keene with Hillel Levin.

In 2008, Paramount Pictures and GK-Films purchased Keene's story rights to make a feature film. Brad Pitt was approached to play the lead role as James "Jimmy" Keene, and Pitt’s production company Plan B was set to produce alongside Paramount and GK-Films. The rights were later purchased by HBO for a planned television series.

The rights were finally acquired by Apple and the series was announced in January 2021, with Taron Egerton and Paul Walter Hauser cast to star. Ray Liotta was added to the cast in March, and Greg Kinnear and Sepideh Moafi joined the next month. The six-episode limited series premiered on July 8, 2022, on Apple TV+.

Production for the series began in New Orleans in April 2021.

== Release ==
Black Bird premiered on July 8, 2022, on Apple TV+.

== Reception ==
=== Critical response ===
The review aggregator website Rotten Tomatoes reported a 98% approval rating with an average rating of 8.2/10, based on 80 critic reviews. The website's critics consensus reads, "Dennis Lehane's penchant for authentic grit is on full display in Black Bird, an absorbing prison drama distinguished by its moral complexity and elevated by an outstanding ensemble." Metacritic, which uses a weighted average, assigned a score of 80 out of 100 based on 29 critics, indicating "generally favorable reviews".

Mike Hale of The New York Times stated, "Despite that imbalance in the dramatic weight, Black Bird is mostly engaging — Hauser is onscreen a lot, and the production has a hushed quality, with occasional expressionistic touches, that is reminiscent of David Fincher’s crime stories. It’s at its best in the fourth episode, directed by Jim McKay (“Our Song"): Egerton is more relaxed, and Hauser even sharper than usual. And McKay's depictions of a prison riot and the subsequent cleanup, meticulously supervised by Hall, are among the show's best moments."

Brian Tallerico of RogerEbert.com gave the series three and a half stars out of four, commenting, "Its release in the era of a national obsession with true crime could lead people to dismiss Black Bird, but this show is worth your time even if you don’t usually buy into the genre. It reminded me more of rich, character-driven material like The Night Of than so many of the 'ripped from the headlines' mini-series of late. It has the weight of some of Lehane’s best fiction, even though it’s all so disturbingly true."

Daniel Fienberg of The Hollywood Reporter wrote, "Black Bird gains a tremendous amount of gravity from one of Liotta’s last screen appearances. Liotta’s death brings additional poignancy to a character who, through failing health and visits to his incarcerated son, is dealing with his own mortality and legacy... Black Bird is methodical (though not as methodical as Mindhunter) in a way that gains power as the show goes along... There’s enough good drama here to make that worthwhile."

=== Accolades ===
Year	Award	Category	Nominee	Result	Ref.
2022	30th EnergaCAMERIMAGE International Film Festival	TV Series Competition	Black Bird	Nominated	
2023	28th Critics' Choice Awards	Best Supporting Actor in a Limited Series or Movie Made for Television	Paul Walter Hauser	Won	
2023	28th Critics' Choice Awards	Best Supporting Actor in a Limited Series or Movie Made for Television	Ray Liotta	Nominated	
2023	80th Golden Globe Awards	Best Limited or Anthology Series or Television Film	Black Bird	Nominated	
2023	80th Golden Globe Awards	Best Actor – Miniseries or Television Film	Taron Egerton	Nominated	
2023	80th Golden Globe Awards	Best Supporting Actor – Series, Miniseries or Television Film	Paul Walter Hauser	Won	
2023	29th Screen Actors Guild Awards	Outstanding Male Actor in a Miniseries or Television Movie	Taron Egerton	Nominated	
2023	29th Screen Actors Guild Awards	Outstanding Male Actor in a Miniseries or Television Movie	Paul Walter Hauser	Nominated	
2023	39th TCA Awards	Outstanding Achievement in Movies, Miniseries and Specials	Black Bird	Nominated	
2023	75th Primetime Creative Arts Emmy Awards	Outstanding Cinematography for a Limited or Anthology Series or Movie	Natalie Kingston (for "Hand to Mouth")	Won	
2023	75th Primetime Emmy Awards	Outstanding Lead Actor in a Limited or Anthology Series or Movie	Taron Egerton	Nominated	
2023	75th Primetime Emmy Awards	Outstanding Supporting Actor in a Limited or Anthology Series or Movie	Paul Walter Hauser	Won	
2023	75th Primetime Emmy Awards	Outstanding Supporting Actor in a Limited or Anthology Series or Movie	Ray Liotta	Nominated	
