= Jimmy Keene =

American former FBI operative and author

- Born: Kankakee, Illinois, U.S.
- Known for: Former FBI operative, author
- Notable work: In with the Devil: a Fallen Hero, a Serial Killer and Dangerous Bargain for Redemption by James Keene with Hillel Levin (2010)
- Television: Black Bird executive producer

James Keene is an American former FBI operative and author. In 1996, Keene was sentenced to ten years' imprisonment on a marijuana-related conspiracy charge. Seven months into his incarceration, he was approached by the FBI and offered a deal which would result in having his record expunged. He was asked to transfer undercover to the prison where suspected serial killer Larry Hall was being held, befriend him, and obtain information which could be used to block Hall's appeal against his sentence. Keene was successful and he was released from prison having served 17 months.

In 2010, James Keene with Hillel Levin wrote a memoir about his experience titled In with the Devil: a Fallen Hero, a Serial Killer and Dangerous Bargain for Redemption. It was adapted into the television miniseries Black Bird, which was released in 2022. Keene served as executive producer on the series.

== Early life and education ==
James Keene was born on New Year's Eve in Kankakee, Illinois, an exurb of Chicago, to James Keene and Lynn Keene. His father was a police officer, and his mother owned a restaurant. He attended Kankakee Eastridge High School and then Triton College, where he was captain of the football and wrestling teams, and lettered in track and field. He went on to attend the University of Arizona, where he earned another degree. Keene also practiced martial arts.

== FBI operative inside federal prison ==
Keene became involved in selling marijuana as a teenager. In 1996, he was charged by the FBI and the DEA on a conspiracy charge. Prior to his sentencing, Keene did not cooperate with law enforcement according to his autobiography. He was sentenced to 10 years in prison.

Approximately seven months into Keene's sentence, the FBI and prosecutors approached him with an arrangement that would allow Keene to reduce his prison sentence and expunge his record. The arrangement involved Keene gathering incriminating evidence on suspected serial killer Larry Hall at the direction of law enforcement. The cooperation involved him being transferred to the Medical Center for Federal Prisoners (MCFP). Keene was tasked with befriending Hall, a man suspected of raping and murdering dozens of girls between 1980 and 1994. Law enforcement had only found the remains of one of Hall's victims, 15-year-old Jessica Roach. Hall confessed to the murder, but prosecutors lacked strong physical evidence for the case. After Hall retracted his confession and his attorneys filed an appeal, the FBI feared Hall's possible release was imminent. However, if Keene succeeded in obtaining new incriminating evidence about Hall while in MCFP, the U.S. Attorney and FBI agreed to end Keene's sentence and expunge his record.

With the guidance and training by the FBI, a cover story was arranged for Keene as part of his undercover mission. He was transferred to the MCFP, where he gained Hall's trust. Hall allegedly admitted to specific details about many of his crimes and murders in graphic details to Keene that no one but the killer could have known. On one occasion, Keene witnessed Hall with a map that appeared to show the locations of his victims' remains, and Keene reported the information to his FBI contacts. Based on the new evidence Keene uncovered, Larry Hall's appeal was denied. Hall remains in prison and has confessed to over twenty murders during his incarceration. He is serving a life sentence without parole in Butner, North Carolina.

The U.S. Attorney and FBI rewarded Keene's cooperation with early release and a clean record.

== Media adaptations and books ==
In 2008, Paramount Pictures and GK-Films purchased Keene's story rights to make a feature film. Brad Pitt was attached to play the lead role as James "Jimmy" Keene, and Pitt's production company Plan B was set to co-produce. The rights were later purchased by Apple TV for the miniseries Black Bird, with Taron Egerton as Keene and Paul Walter Hauser as Larry Hall. The series was released in 2022. Keene was executive producer on the project and had a cameo appearance in the final episode.

In 2010, Keene published In with the Devil: A Fallen Hero, a Serial Killer, and a Dangerous Bargain for Redemption, an autobiographical account of his time working as an FBI operative helping to secure the conviction of serial killer Larry Hall. His second book, Black Bird: One Man's Freedom Hides in Another Man's Darkness, was published in 2022. In 2023, Keene published The Chicago Phoenix: Jimmy Keene's Untold Story, a follow-up to Black Bird. It covers Keene's early years in Chicago and gives further details on his time as an FBI operative. In 2024, Keene released his fourth book, the novel The Wanderer: Bigamy, Deceit and Murder.

== See also ==
- List of Apple TV original programming
