= Larry Hall (criminal) =

American suspected serial killer (born 1962)

- Hall's 1994 mug shot
- Born: Larry DeWayne Hall; December 11, 1962 (age 63); Wabash, Indiana, U.S.
- Education: High school diploma
- Motive: Possession; Control; Sexual sadism
- Conviction: Kidnapping
- Penalty: Life imprisonment

Details
- Victims: 2 confirmed, (Note: Although Hall confessed to and was convicted of the 1993 kidnapping of 15-year-old Jessica Roach, he was not charged with her murder because authorities were unable to pinpoint where she had been killed. Circumstantial evidence also implicates him in the disappearance of 19-year-old Tricia Reitler, which occurred on March 29 of the same year; he confessed to having abducted and murdered her.) 35–40+ confessed and suspected
- Span of crimes: June 28, 1982 – September 23, 1993 (suspected)
- Country: United States
- States: Indiana, Illinois (confirmed); Wyoming, Michigan, Missouri, Kansas, Georgia, Ohio, Alabama, Pennsylvania, Wisconsin, Virginia, Tennessee, Kentucky (suspected)
- Weapons: Knife, rope, hands, belt
- Date apprehended: October 28, 1994
- Imprisoned at: FCC Butner, North Carolina

Larry DeWayne Hall (born December 11, 1962) is an American kidnapper, alleged rapist, murderer, and serial killer. An aficionado of the American Revolution and Civil War, Hall traveled around the Midwest for historical reenactments and is believed to have abducted, raped, tortured, and murdered dozens of girls and women; however, he has never been convicted for any murders.

Hall came to police attention after the discovery of a 15-year-old's remains in November 1993, and was convicted of her kidnapping. He later confessed to that and an additional murder, though recanted his confessions of both crimes. Since his arrest, Hall has confessed to more than thirty-five murders, recanting them all. However, he has also confessed to murders where he was ruled out as a suspect or gave false location for buried bodies, making his claims dubious. Nevertheless, some authorities believe he could be responsible for the deaths and disappearances of between forty and fifty young women, which would place him among the most prolific serial killers in American history.

== Early life and education ==
Larry DeWayne Hall was born in Wabash, Indiana, on December 11, 1962, to parents Robert Hall, a gravedigger at Wabash's Falls Cemetery, and his wife. Larry has an identical twin brother, Gary. There are some reports that Larry was deprived of oxygen at birth and spent several days in a neonatal intensive care unit.

Hall and his brother Gary attended West Ward Elementary School, where Hall displayed antisocial behavior and struggled academically due to his low IQ. According to Gary, Hall did not form platonic or romantic relationships. Despite his brother's efforts to be a positive influence, Hall allegedly tried to kill him several times. Hall was often teased throughout school for his learning difficulties, in addition to his frequent night terrors, various speech impediments, and bedwetting.

At age 12, Larry began digging graves with his father, which desensitized him to the presence of human cadavers. He allegedly stole from the coffins, possibly at his father's direction. Larry's father lost his job when his aggressive alcoholism caused him to put cadavers in the wrong gravesites, forcing the family to leave the house allocated for them in the cemetery and move to a shack with just one bedroom.

At the age of 15, Larry and his brother were both arrested for breaking the windows of a downtown storefront. Larry is also suspected of committing additional acts of arson, burglary, and other petty crimes during his adolescence. After high school, Larry got a job as a janitor and began traveling around the country to take part in American Civil War re-enactments.

== Murders ==
The FBI believes that Hall began killing in the early 1980s. Over the subsequent decade, numerous female corpses, some young and unidentified, were discovered and later attributed to Hall due to their bodies being strangled and sexually mutilated. Hall frequented historical re-enactment sites around the U.S. and would select victims from nearby towns and cities. He abducted his victims, who were primarily but not exclusively young white girls and adult women, and would often, but not always, rape and torture them, before then stabbing or strangling them to death. He usually dismembered their bodies post-mortem and engaged in sexual acts with their corpses.

=== Alleged victims ===
- On June 28, 1982, 19-year-old Naomi Lee Kidder left Buffalo, Wyoming, with several friends en route to Rawlins, Wyoming. They stayed at the Travel Lodge Hotel until June 29, 1982, when Kidder left to go hitchhiking. This was the last time she was seen alive. Kidder's nude remains were found in Natrona County on September 10, 1982, in what appeared to be a partially dug grave. She was identified on March 10, 1993, through dental records. Her cause of death was ligature strangulation. Hall is considered a viable suspect because a document bearing Kidder's name was found in his possession after his arrest.
- On September 6, 1986, the body of a young woman was found nude, strangled and sexually mutilated a day after her death in a cornfield near Summerfield, Illinois. The unidentified woman was referred to by detectives as the "Summerfield Jane Doe," and was buried in the Mount Hope Cemetery under a gravestone that said "Jane Doe: Known Only to God". In 2007, the woman's body was identified as being 26-year-old Eulalia Mylia "Lolly" Chavez after fingerprints from an arrest record matched. After confessing to Chavez' murder to a St. Louis television reporter via letter, Hall became a suspect. DNA evidence at the crime scene proved to be inconclusive against Hall's DNA.
- Linda Lynn Weldy, aged 10, disappeared on February 24, 1987, after she was dropped off by her school bus near her home on McClung Road in La Porte, Indiana, at about 3:30 pm. Her body was found three weeks later on March 17, along an abandoned railroad track nine miles away from where she was last seen, on County Road 500 South near Kingsbury. She had been manually strangled. According to investigators, Hall was in the area at that time.
- At around 2:00 p.m. on June 4, 1987, 16-year-old Wendy Louise Felton stayed home in Marion, Indiana, when her older sister drove their parents part-way to an airport for a business trip that afternoon. When her sister returned home at about 5:00 pm, she found Felton was gone, but all of her belongings were left behind in her bedroom. Felton's home was less than twenty-five miles from Wabash, which is where Hall lived at the time and is located only a few miles away from a re-enactment site he often visited. Detectives have not ruled out Hall as a suspect.
- 19-year-old Paulette Sue Webster was last seen walking home from a friend's house in Chester, Illinois, at 11:00 p.m. on September 2, 1988. She has not been seen since. Authorities initially believed she left on her own accord, but foul play is now suspected in her case. In 2011, Hall sent a letter to author Christopher Hawley Martin, a Wabash native who wrote a book about Hall, in which he claimed responsibility for Webster's murder. Hall claimed Paulette was taken from the main east and west roads through Chester near a mobile home park. He then claimed he took Paulette to a remote location where she was kept and sexually assaulted for several hours. Hall either threw her in the Mississippi River or buried her. Hall wrote, "If I did it, I would have put her in a river or in a field."
- On July 1, 1991, Michelle Lee Dewey, a 20-year-old single mother, was found strangled in her second-floor apartment on South Downey Avenue in the Irvington section of Indianapolis. Her 18-month-old son was in a back bedroom with the door wedged shut; he was unharmed. Hall's twin brother, Gary, claimed that he confessed to killing Dewey. Hall had visited Indianapolis that day after seeing an advertisement for a 1982 Dodge van. Authorities suspect that Hall had spotted Dewey sunbathing in the backyard.
- Laurie Jean Depies, aged 20, was seen entering her grey 1984 Volkswagen at the Fox River Mall in Grand Chute, Wisconsin, on August 19, 1992, at approximately 10:00 pm. She apparently arrived at her boyfriend's apartment complex in the 300 block of West Wilson Avenue in Menasha between approximately 10:15 and 10:30 pm. Depies' boyfriend had been waiting in his apartment with his sister and a friend. They heard her car pull into the lot and went looking for her when she did not arrive at the apartment. They found her locked vehicle in the complex parking lot. The hood was found to have a Styrofoam soda cup on it, and Depies' purse and overnight bag were still inside. In 2010, Hall, who was first identified as a suspect in Depies' disappearance in 1995, admitted to abducting and murdering her. Investigators searched the area where Hall said he had buried Depies, but they were unable to locate either her body or any other tangible proof of his claim.
- 19-year-old Tricia Lynn Reitler was last seen at approximately 8:00 p.m. on March 29, 1993, at Indiana Wesleyan University in Marion. Reitler walked to Marsh Supermarket, which was approximately half a mile from the university's campus, and purchased a soda and a magazine before leaving the store, intent on returning to her dormitory in Bowman Hall. Authorities believe she was abducted during her return journey. Between the store and the university, close to Seybold Pool and Centre Elementary School, Reitler's bloodstained pants, shirt and shoes were found in a field. Investigators found maps, ether, photos and newspaper articles concerning Reitler inside Hall's vehicle. Hall eventually withdrew his confession to Reitler's murder, and he was never charged in connection with her disappearance. Investigators searched an area of Grant County near the Mississinewa Reservoir for Reitler's body. Hall led them to the scene, saying he had buried her body there, but no evidence was located.
- On September 23, 1993, 15-year-old Jessica Lynn Roach was last seen at approximately 3:30 p.m. riding her bicycle near her home in Georgetown, Illinois. On November 8, her body was discovered in a cornfield near Perrysville, Indiana. In early 1994, two 14-year-old Georgetown girls reported to police they were followed by a man in a van. Within a few days another report was taken in Georgetown by two more teenage girls who were followed while walking home. They were able to get a partial license plate number. Police determined that the vehicle was registered to Hall, who was brought in for questioning in October 1994. After finding evidence in his van connecting him to the disappearance of Roach, and after Hall gave details that only the perpetrator of the crime could have known, he eventually confessed to and was charged with Roach's abduction. He was not, however, charged with her murder because police could not pinpoint where she was killed. He was arrested at his parents' residence in Wabash in December 1994 and found guilty in June 1995.

== Incarceration ==
In 1996, the FBI reached out to a Chicago businessman named James Keene, who was serving a ten-year prison sentence on a drug conspiracy charge. After having learned of Keene's affability and charisma, and worrying that Hall could win his appeal against his conviction for the Roach kidnapping, the bureau offered to totally commute and erase Keene's sentence if he agreed to be transferred to the same maximum security prison as Hall to befriend him and obtain the locations of the bodies of his victims.

Keene agreed to the proposition, and Hall eventually confessed to him that he had killed Reitler. Hall showed Keene a map he was working on of the American Midwest with red dots and names over it representing his victims. In response, unable to contain his growing sense of revulsion, Keene yelled at Hall, calling him "one of the most despicable forms of human life on this planet".

Hall feigned outrage, and Keene, unable to reach his government contacts or prove his true identity, was placed in solitary confinement for two weeks before being released. This gave Hall time to dispose of the map, which was never recovered by authorities. Hall's eventual appeal was denied, and Keene was released from his sentence.

Hall is serving life without the possibility of parole in Federal Correctional Complex in North Carolina.

== In popular culture ==
=== Miniseries ===
The American crime drama miniseries Black Bird (2022) depicts Keene's relationship with Hall in prison. Hall is portrayed by Paul Walter Hauser.

Developed by Dennis Lehane, the limited series is based on the autobiographical novel In with the Devil: a Fallen Hero, a Serial Killer, and a Dangerous Bargain for Redemption (2010), written by James Keene with Hillel Levin.

On July 8, 2022 (4 years ago), the six-episode miniseries premiered on Apple TV+.
