= Dorrian's Red Hand Restaurant =

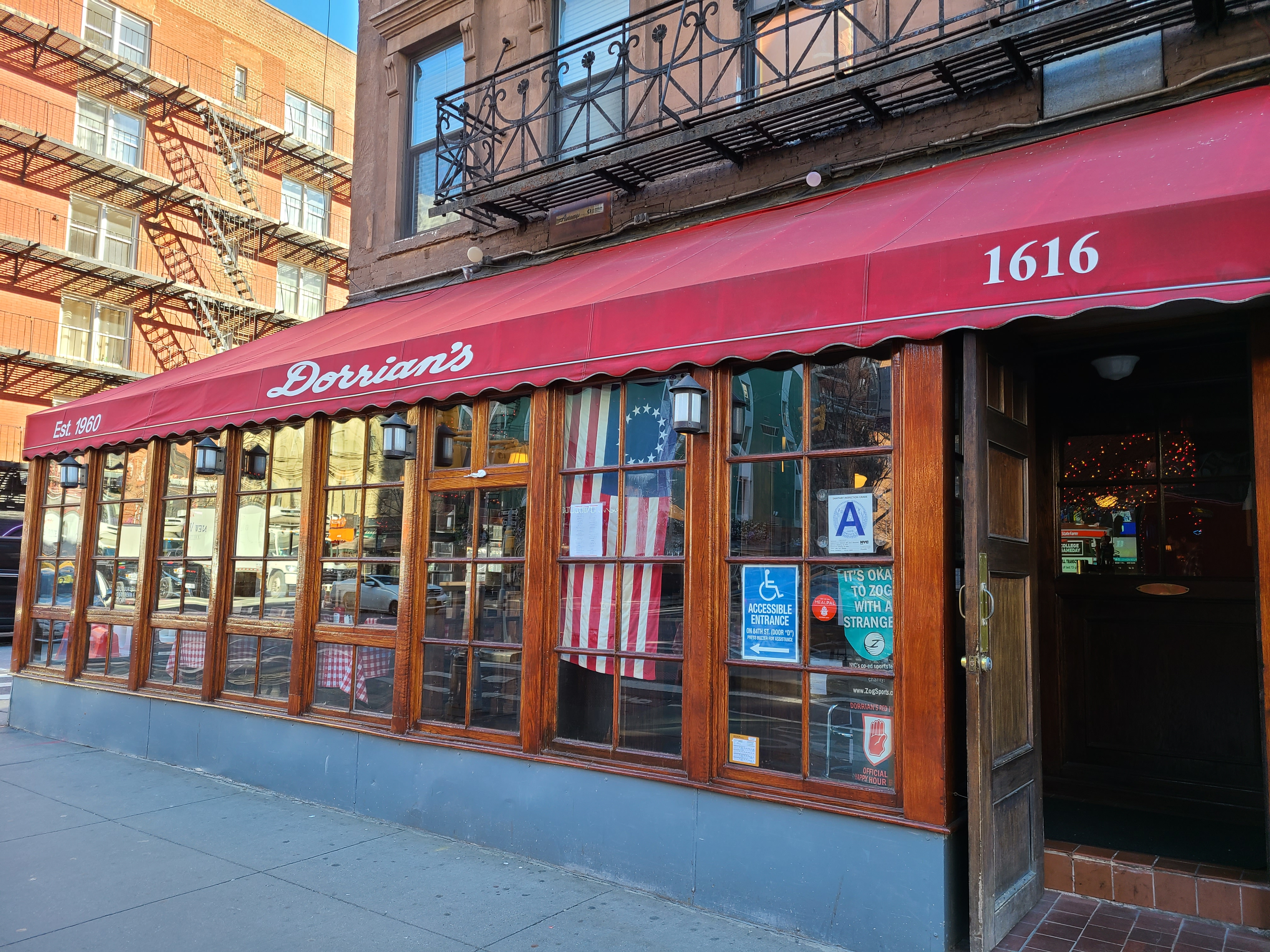
- Photographed in 2023
- Interactive map of Dorrian's Red Hand Restaurant

Restaurant information
- Established: 1960; 66 years ago
- Food type: Hamburgers, Pub Food
- Location: 1616 Second Avenue (on East 84th Street), Upper East Side, Manhattan, New York City, New York, 10028, United States
- Coordinates: 40.776401°N 73.952574°W
- Website: https://www.dorrians-nyc.com

Dorrian's Red Hand, also known simply as Dorrian's, is a famed Irish-American bar located at 1616 Second Avenue at East 84th Street, on the Upper East Side of Manhattan, New York City, New York.

Started by Irish immigrant James "Red Dog" Dorrian in 1960 and operated by his son Jack, the popular hangout became a social pillar for preppy Upper East Side teenagers, college students, and young urban professionals. It is known for its "old time" atmosphere and the chummy and clubby demeanor of its patrons. Today, the bar is still family-owned and managed by Jack Dorrian's son, Jimmy. Dorrian's has expanded to a second location in Jersey City, New Jersey. Dorrian's Red Hand is a common hang out for the players of the New York Yankees.

Dorrian's has served as a filming location for U.S. Marshals, The Deli, and episodes of Gossip Girl, Gallery Girls, and "Fleishman Is In Trouble".

== See also ==
- List of Irish restaurants
