= Kidnapping of Jack Teich =

1974 kidnapping in New York

Jack Teich kidnapping
- Location: Kings Point, New York
- Date: November 12, 1974
- Attack type: Kidnapping
- Weapons: Rifle, handguns
- Victim: Jack Teich
- Perpetrators: Up to four men, including Richard Warren Williams
- Motive: Extortion; Antisemitic hate
- Inquiries: FBI; Nassau County Police Department
- Accused: Richard Warren Williams; Charles Berkley
- Charges: Kidnapping, grand larceny, conspiracy
- Convicted: Richard Warren Williams

The 1974 kidnapping of Jack Teich in Kings Point, New York, resulted in the largest ransom paid in the United States up to that point. The subsequent criminal cases led to financial compensation and freedom for the primary suspect.

Teich was 34 years old when he was abducted in his driveway. After being held, bound in chains, tape, and handcuffs, in a closet in an undetermined location in the Bronx for seven days, he was released in exchange for a $750,000 ransom ($4.9 million in 2025). In 2013, this was listed as one of the most notorious crimes on Long Island. The Teich case was also cited in a 1975 New York Times article indicating kidnappings had increased over the previous ten years. Teich's older brother, Buddy, was the original target of the kidnapping.

== Kidnapping ==
Jack Teich (born February 3, 1940) was reported missing by his wife, Janet, on November 12, 1974, after he failed to return home from work. He had been abducted at gunpoint in his driveway in Kings Point. The kidnappers began contacting his family the following night and demanded $750,000 in exchange for his release. At the time, this was the largest ransom for a US-based kidnapping. The ransom was paid, with Teich's wife and brother following instructions to leave the money in a locker in Pennsylvania Station. Teich was released soon after, but the authorities lost sight of his captors during the retrieval. The FBI investigators indicated concern for his safety and that of others in the public area, and followed too far behind the person they were pursuing.

== Investigation ==
Immediately after Teich's release, up to four suspects were sought for their roles in the crime. It was believed there was political motivation for the kidnapping and that Teich was targeted for his wealth. During the week he was held, Teich was bound in chains and kept in a closet. His kidnappers frequently made antisemitic and anti-rich comments and accusations, and threatened to rob him. Although he was told he had been taken to Harlem, it is believed he was held in the Bronx. Teich was told the money would "go out of the country to feed hungry people, Palestinians, and poor blacks". In September 1976, Richard Williams was arrested in California, where money tied to the ransom was used to buy groceries and supplies. Williams was found with $38,000 from the ransom money in the walls of a mobile home he shared.

== Trial ==
Williams's trial began in 1977 and lasted 14 weeks. The defense caused numerous delays. Daily newspaper coverage indicated frustration and allegations of undue delay voiced both by the defense (the defendant and his attorney, Donald Kane) and Judge Alexander Vitale.

In July 1978, Williams was sentenced to 15 years for each of the conspiracy and the grand larceny charges, to be served concurrently. He was also sentenced to 25 years to life for the kidnapping.

Charles Berkley, a former employee of Teich's, was still sought as a second suspect. Berkley was found and charged in 1980, but there was insufficient evidence to bring him to trial.

== Post-trial events ==
In January 1984, while still serving his sentence, Williams was awarded $35,501 in damages after his lawyer Fern Steckler successfully argued he was denied civil rights in 1976–1977. He was awarded $25,000 for not receiving eyeglasses despite eyestrain, $10,000 for being repeatedly handcuffed to other inmates for four to eight hours in smoke-filled courthouse detention cells, $500 for being harassed by a corrections officer, and $1 for not receiving a magazine subscription in a timely fashion.

In 1994, Williams's conviction was overturned on the grounds that black jurors had been improperly dismissed. Although it was nearly 10 years after the trial, the 1986 Supreme Court case Batson v. Kentucky gave Williams's open appeal a new avenue. Cases that had open appeals fell under the 1986 ruling. In 1978, the defense had objected to six peremptory challenges used to dismiss black prospective jurors from the panel, but the judge overruled the objections. Later, the prosecution could find an explanation for only three of the six, and a panel found that insufficient to rule out racial motivation.

In June 1997, Williams was released after Judge Frank Gulotta sentenced him to 6 2/3 to 20 years, the maximum being slightly less time than he had already served. Teich vowed at that 1997 hearing to continue seeking repayment through civil suit for trauma and the unrecovered ransom, for a sum of $2,000,000. This remains unresolved.

== Life after the kidnapping ==
Teich remains active in his community and business. He continues to work at Acme Sales Group (formerly Acme Architectural Products Co, Inc.) and Whitehead Company LLC. In 2002, U.S. Representative Nita Lowey cited him on the floor of Congress for his philanthropic and business contributions.

In 2020, more than 45 years since the event, Teich published his memoir of the events, Operation Jacknap: A True Story of Kidnapping, Extortion, Ransom, and Rescue.

Teich's kidnapping inspired Taffy Brodesser-Akner's novel Long Island Compromise.

== See also ==
- List of kidnappings
- List of solved missing person cases: 1950–1999
- Bronfman kidnapping, similar New York kidnapping case in 1975
