= Kildare's Irish Pub =

American restaurant chain

- Industry: Restaurants, Beer, Pub
- Founded: May 2003
- Number of locations: 1
- Products: Irish and American Cuisine, Sandwiches, Hamburgers, Salads, Desserts, Alcoholic Beverages
- Website: www.kildarespubwc.com

Kildare's is an Irish Pub-themed casual dining restaurant chain and drinking establishment in the United States. It was named after County Kildare, located in Ireland, and it specializes in Irish American cuisine.

== History ==
Kildare's pub was established in 2003 The interior of the West Chester location was designed by The Irish Pub Company. The first of the locations opened in West Chester, Pennsylvania, on Gay Street in May 2003.

The pub has been featured in various business publications such as Smart Business Philadelphia and Philadelphia Business Journal.

== Atmosphere ==
The West Chester location was designed and built in order to replicate Old Ireland by the Irish Pub Company, a pub concept designer based in Dublin, Ireland. The interior was built in Ireland and then shipped to the United States.

== See also ==
- List of Irish restaurants
