= Glisan Building =

Building in Portland, Oregon, U.S.

- Interactive map of the Glisan Building area

General information
- Location: Portland, Oregon, United States
- Coordinates: 45.5216748°N 122.6745002°W

The Glisan Building is a historic building in Portland, Oregon's Old Town Chinatown neighborhood, in the United States. The building was constructed in 1889, and houses Kells Irish Pub. It features Queen Anne Italianate style architecture and has been designated a City of Portland Historic Landmark.
