= Kells Irish Pub =

Pub in Portland, Oregon, U.S.

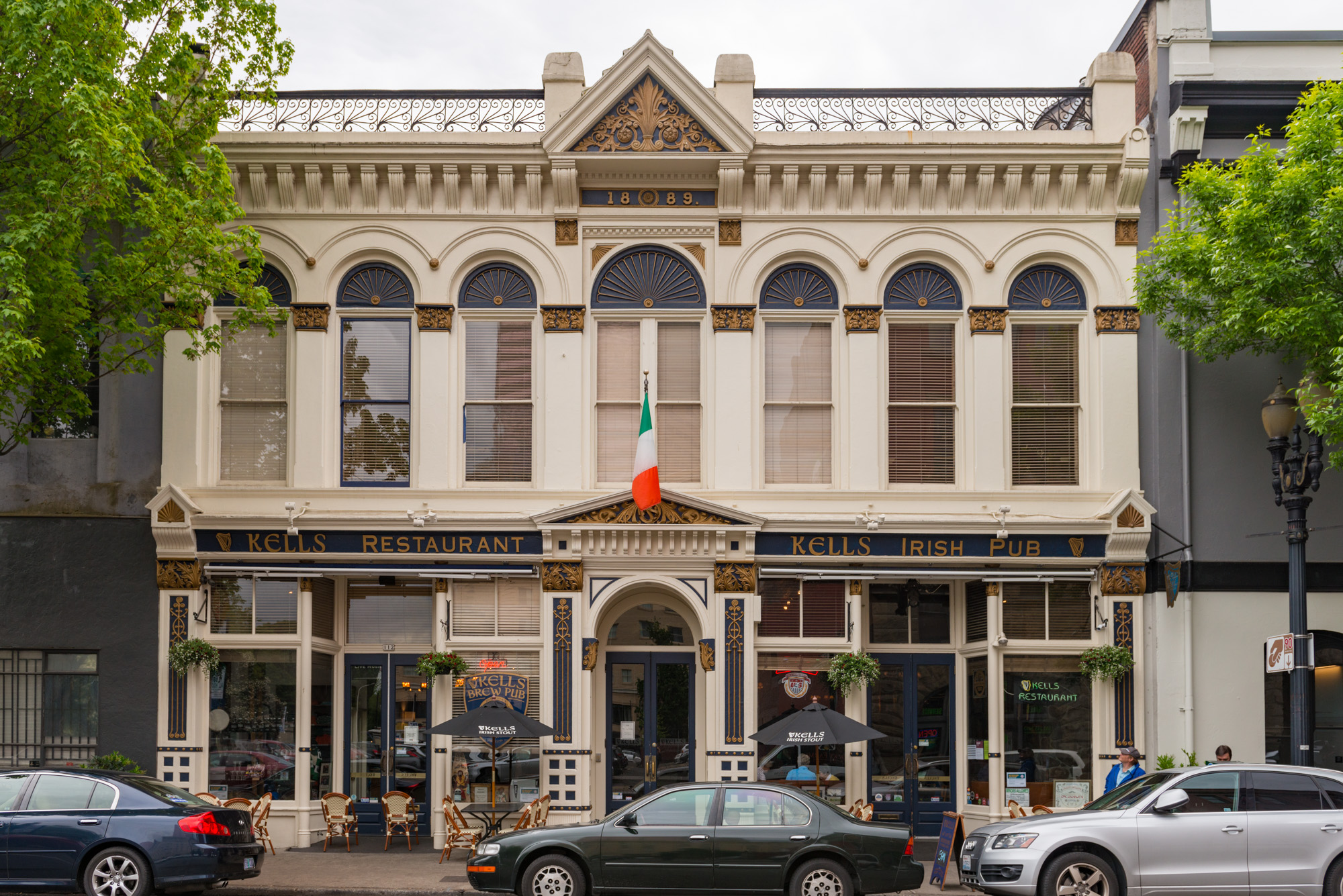
- The restaurant in 2016
- Interactive map of Kells Irish Pub

Restaurant information
- Established: 1990
- Food type: Irish
- Location: 112 Southwest 2nd Avenue, Portland, Multnomah, Oregon, United States
- Coordinates: 45.5217°N 122.6722°W
- Website: kellsportland.com

Kells Irish Pub is a pub in Portland, Oregon, United States.

== Description ==
The restaurant is housed in the Glisan Building, in the southwest portion of the city's Old Town Chinatown neighborhood. Kells serves Irish cuisine. The menu has included Irish Stew with McAleese farm lamb, potatoes, and the brewery's own Irish stout. Bread pudding with whiskey-soaked raisins and Tullamore DEW butter are among the dessert options.

== History ==
Opened in 1990, the restaurant is owned and operated by Gerard and Lucille McAleese. Their son Garrett opened Kells Brew Pub (now Kells Brewery) in northwest Portland in 2012.

Since 1995, money affixed to the ceiling has been donated to charity. The restaurant also hosts an annual Kells Irish Festival, and hosted the first Irish Beer Festival in 2017.

== See also ==
- List of Irish restaurants
