= 75th Primetime Emmy Awards =

2023 American television programming awards

- Promotional poster
- Date: January 15, 2024 (Ceremony); January 6–7, 2024 (Creative Arts Emmys)
- Location: Peacock Theater; Los Angeles, California
- Presented by: Academy of Television Arts & Sciences
- Hosted by: Anthony Anderson

Highlights
- Most awards: Major: The Bear / Succession (6); All: The Bear (10)
- Most nominations: Major: Succession (14); All: Succession (27)
- Comedy Series: The Bear
- Drama Series: Succession
- Limited or Anthology Series: Beef

Television/radio coverage
- Network: Fox
- Runtime: 3 hours
- Viewership: 4.46 million
- Produced by: Jesse Collins Entertainment
- Directed by: Alex Rudzinski

The 75th Primetime Emmy Awards honored the best in American prime time television programming from June 1, 2022, until May 31, 2023, as chosen by the Academy of Television Arts & Sciences. The awards ceremony was held on January 15, 2024, at the Peacock Theater in Downtown Los Angeles, California, and was preceded by the 75th Primetime Creative Arts Emmy Awards on January 6 and 7. The awards were postponed from their original September dates due to the 2023 Hollywood labor disputes. During the ceremony, Emmy Awards were handed out in 26 different categories. The ceremony was produced by Jesse Collins Entertainment, directed by Alex Rudzinski, and broadcast in the United States by Fox. Anthony Anderson hosted the event.

At the main ceremony, The Bear and Succession led all programs with six major wins each, including Outstanding Comedy Series and Outstanding Drama Series, respectively. Other winning programs were Beef with five wins, including Outstanding Limited or Anthology Series, Last Week Tonight with John Oliver with two awards, and Abbott Elementary, Black Bird, Dahmer – Monster: The Jeffrey Dahmer Story, The Daily Show with Trevor Noah, Elton John Live: Farewell from Dodger Stadium, RuPaul's Drag Race and The White Lotus with one each. Including Creative Arts Emmys, The Bear led all programs with ten wins, a record for a comedy series in one year; HBO and Max led all networks and platforms with 31 total wins.

== Winners and nominees ==
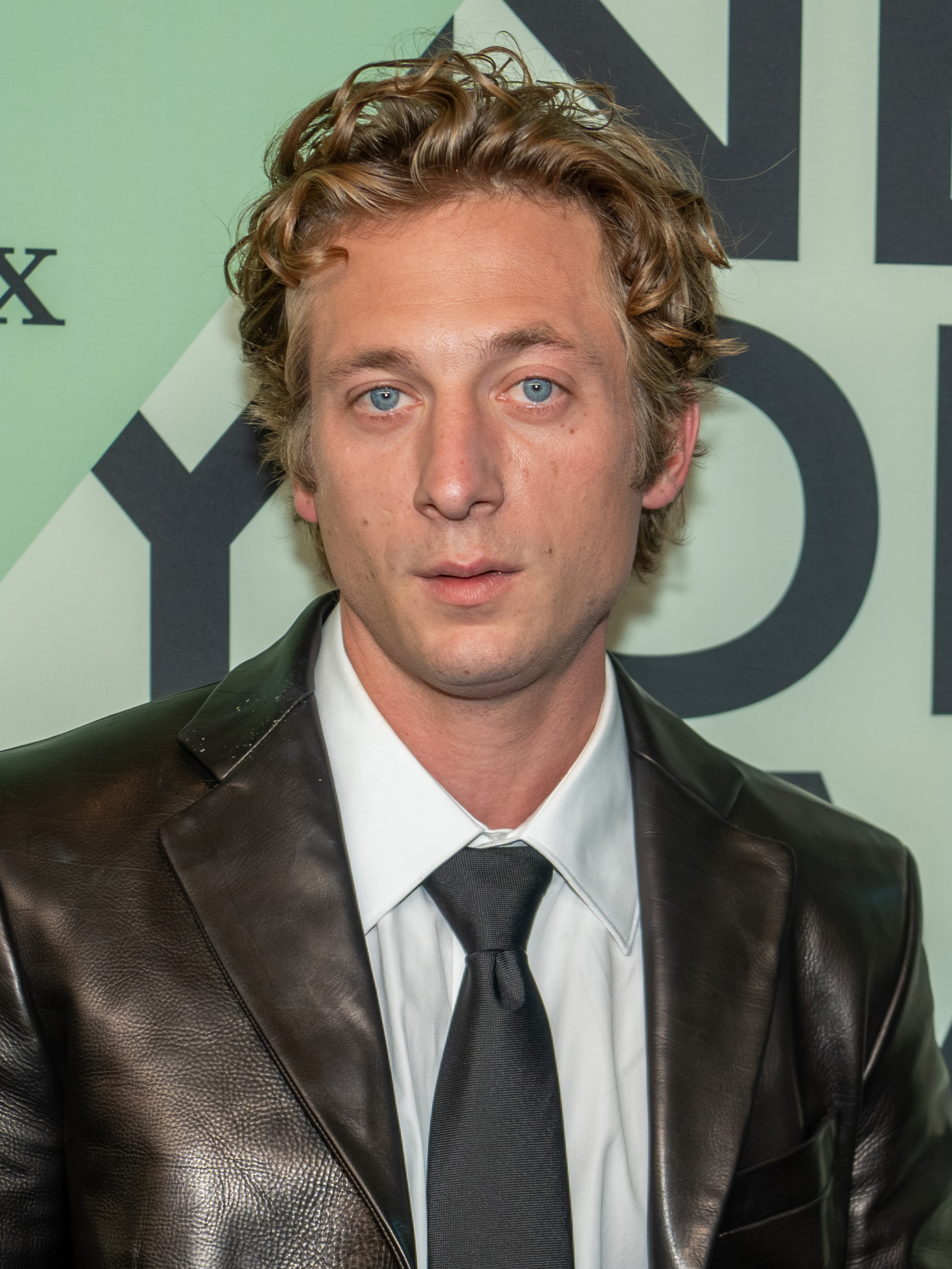
Jeremy Allen White, Outstanding Lead Actor in a Comedy Series winner

Quinta Brunson, Outstanding Lead Actress in a Comedy Series winner

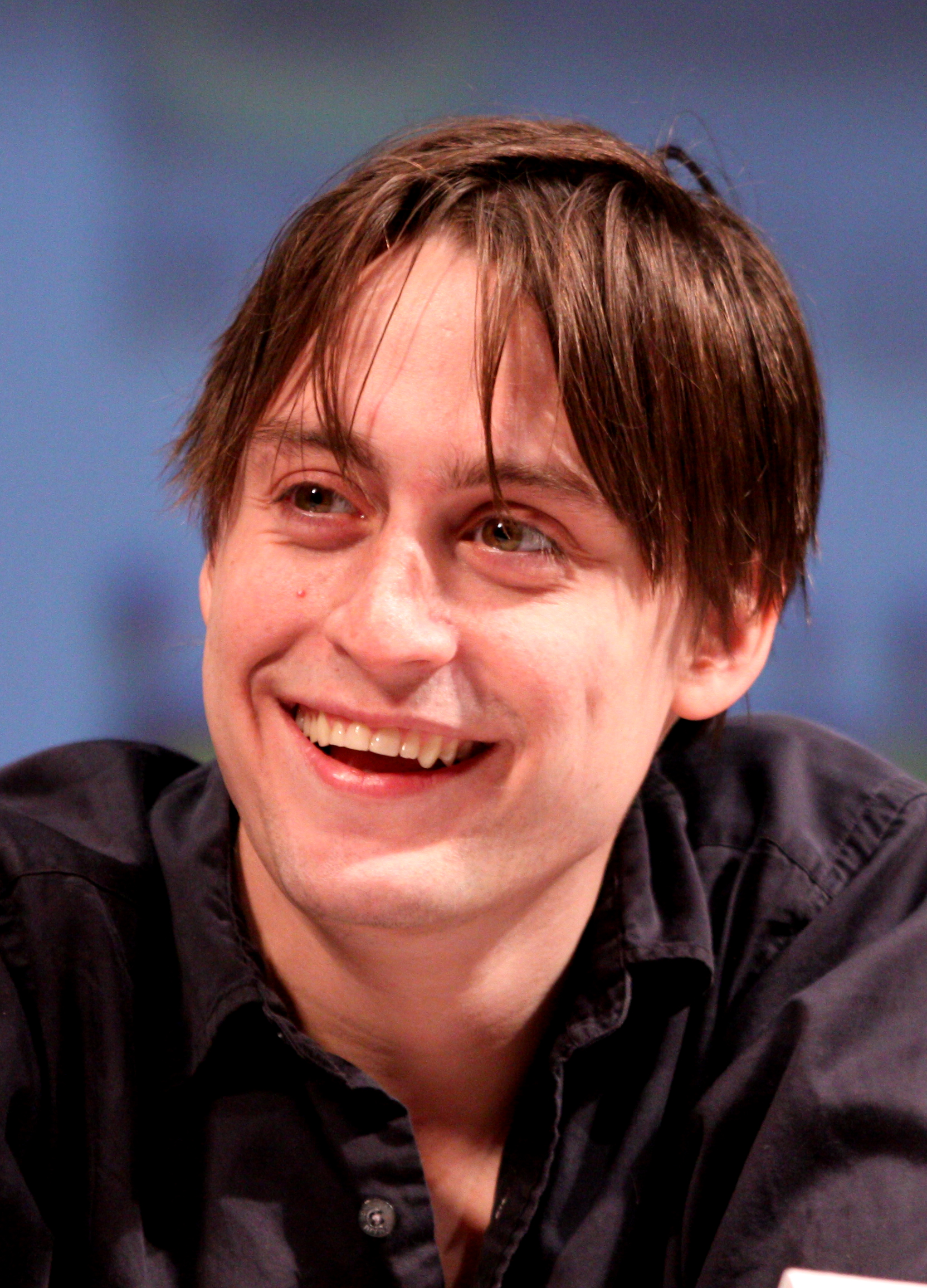
Kieran Culkin, Outstanding Lead Actor in a Drama Series winner

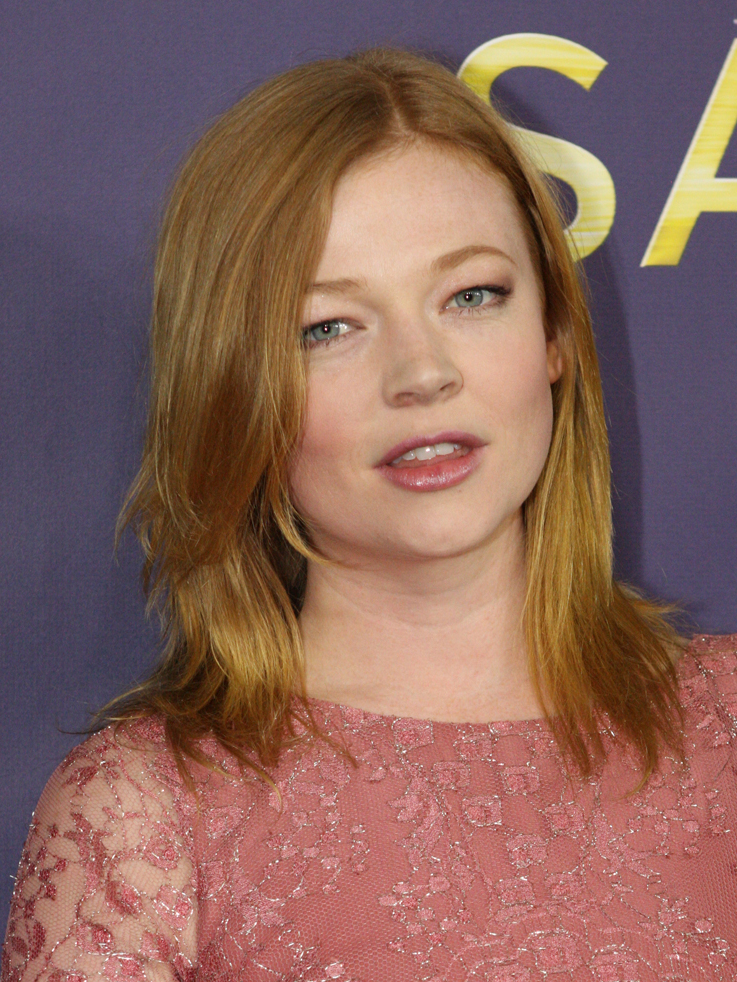
Sarah Snook, Outstanding Lead Actress in a Drama Series winner

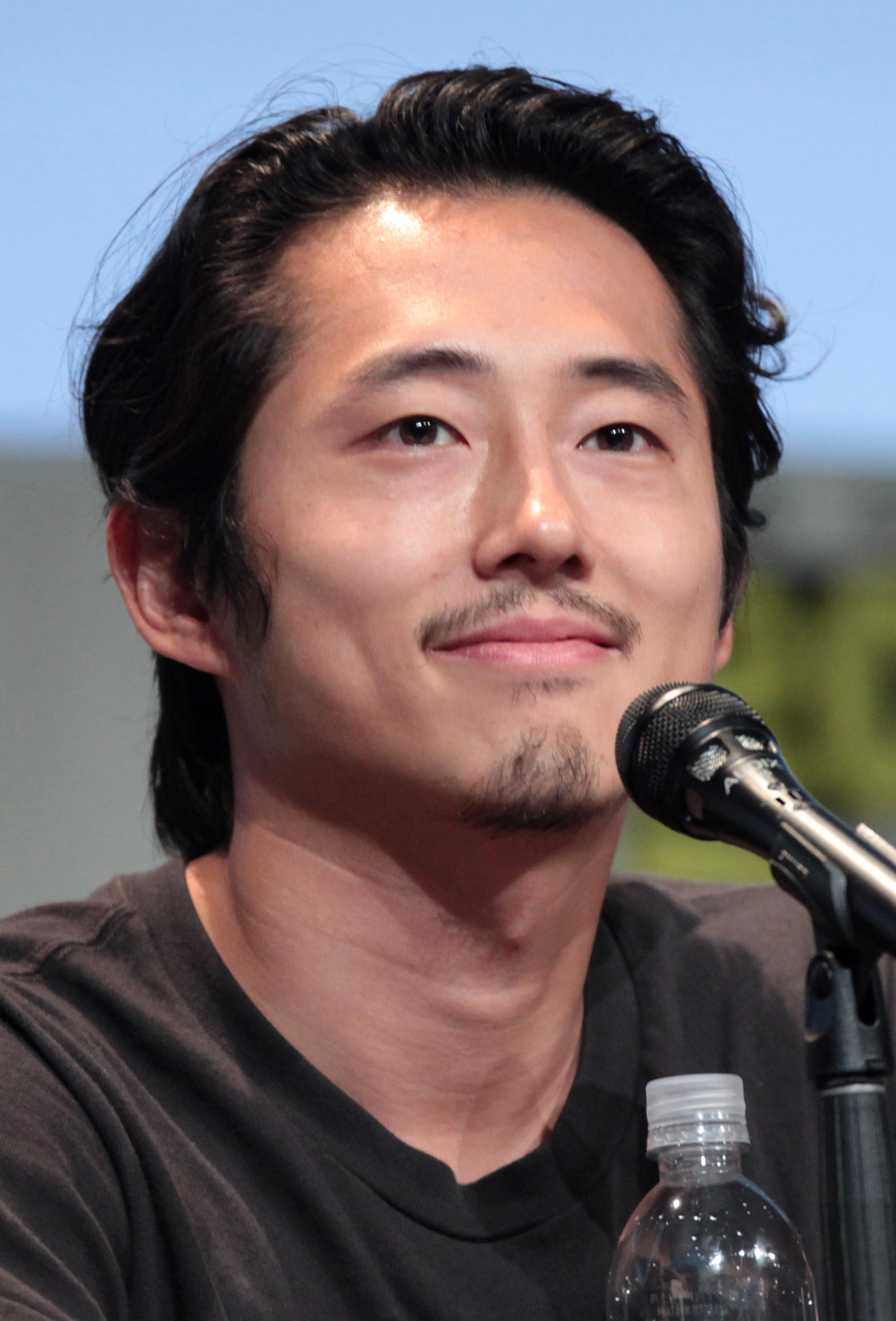
Steven Yeun, Outstanding Lead Actor in a Limited or Anthology Series or Movie winner

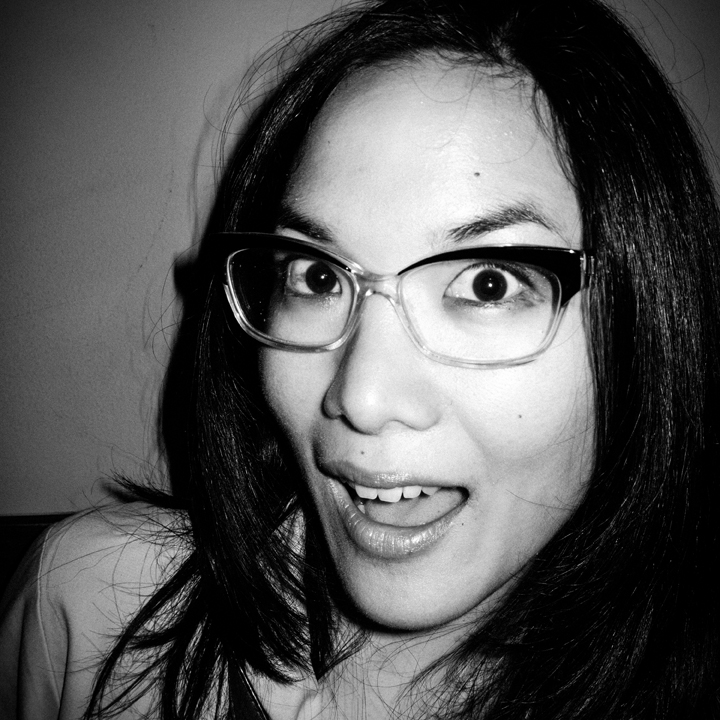
Ali Wong, Outstanding Lead Actress in a Limited or Anthology Series or Movie winner

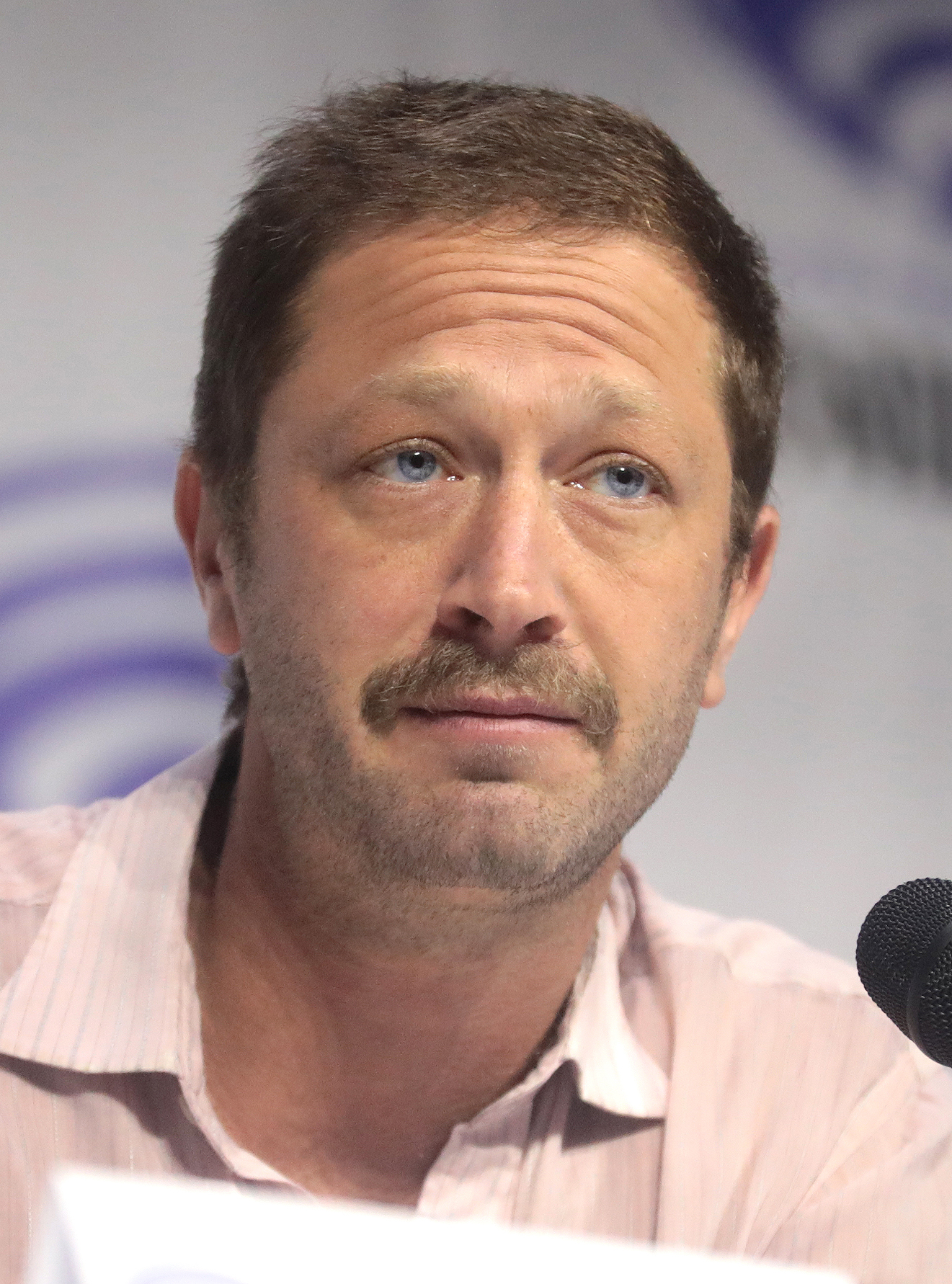
Ebon Moss-Bachrach, Outstanding Supporting Actor in a Comedy Series winner

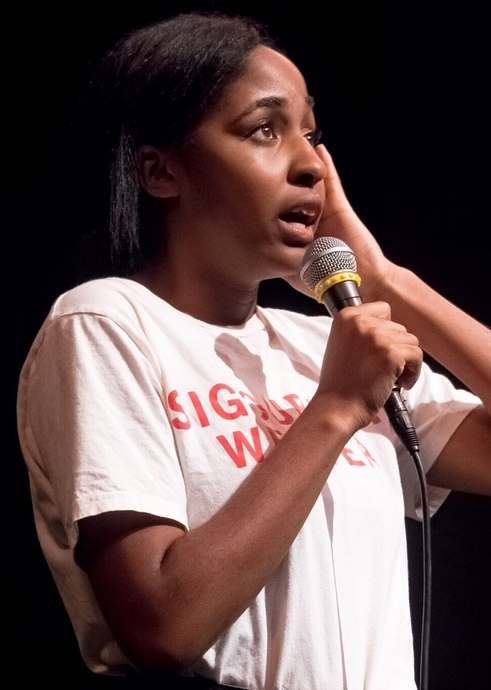
Ayo Edebiri, Outstanding Supporting Actress in a Comedy Series winner

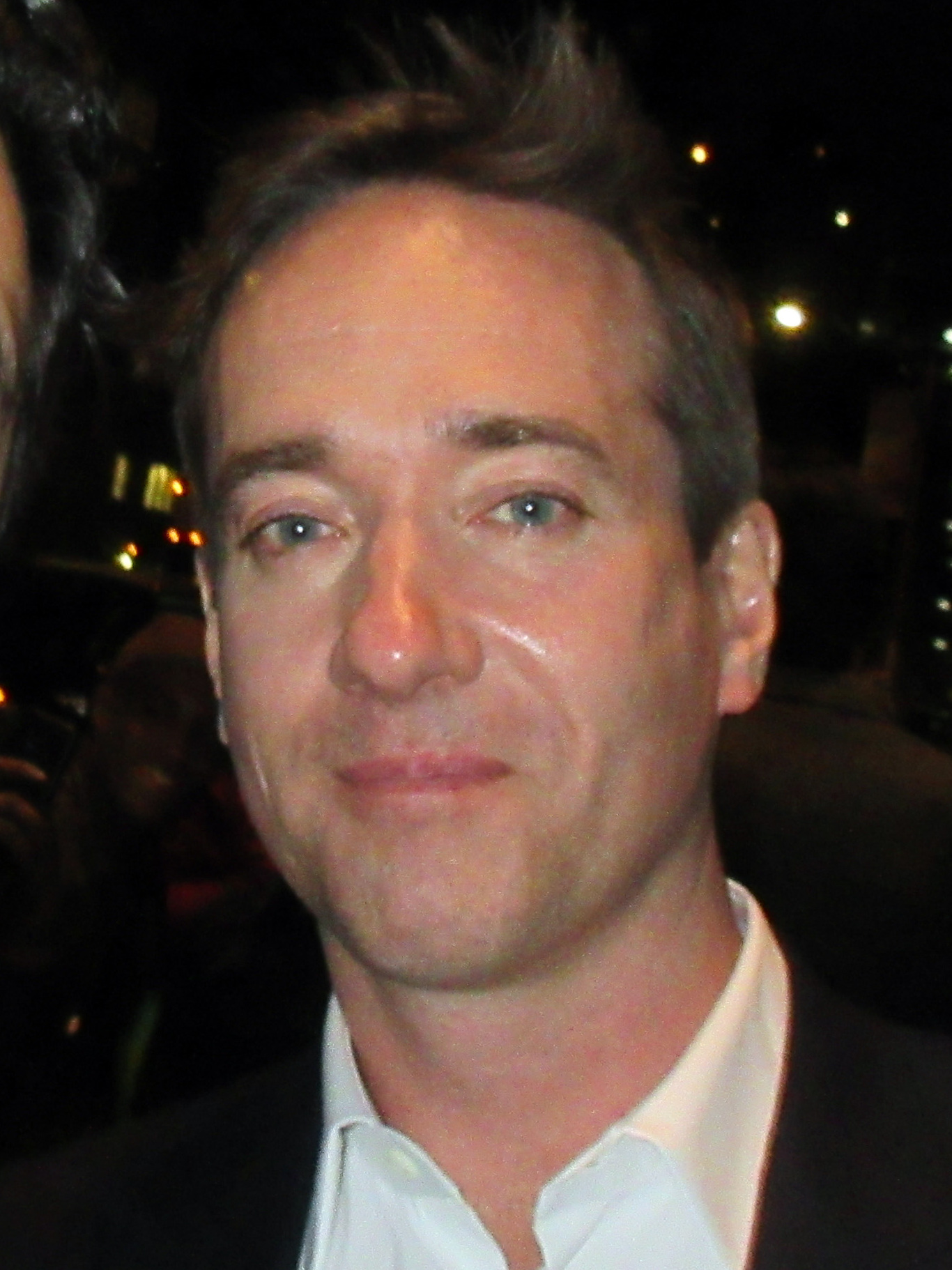
Matthew Macfadyen, Outstanding Supporting Actor in a Drama Series winner

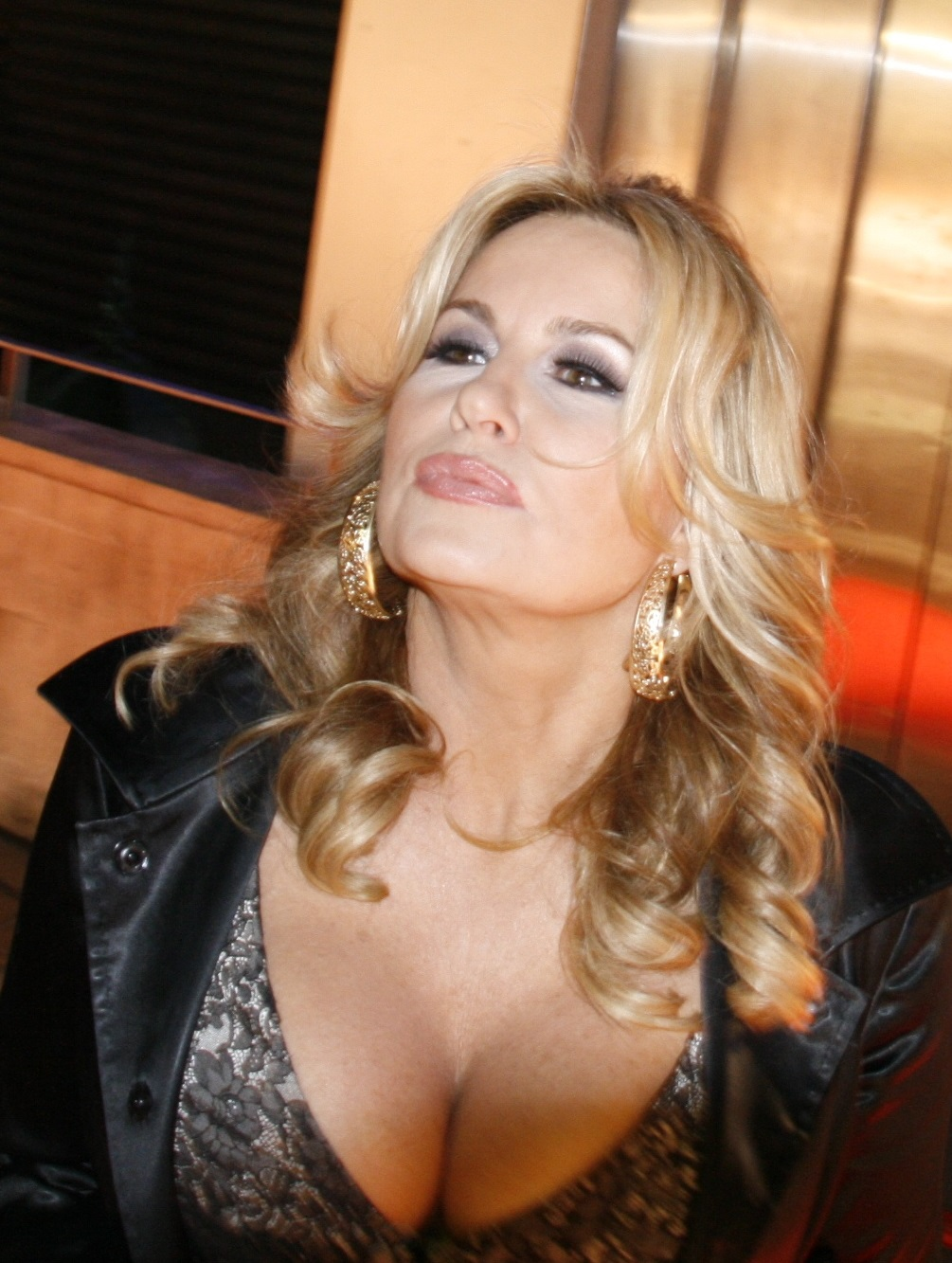
Jennifer Coolidge, Outstanding Supporting Actress in a Drama Series winner

Paul Walter Hauser, Outstanding Supporting Actor in a Limited or Anthology Series or Movie winner

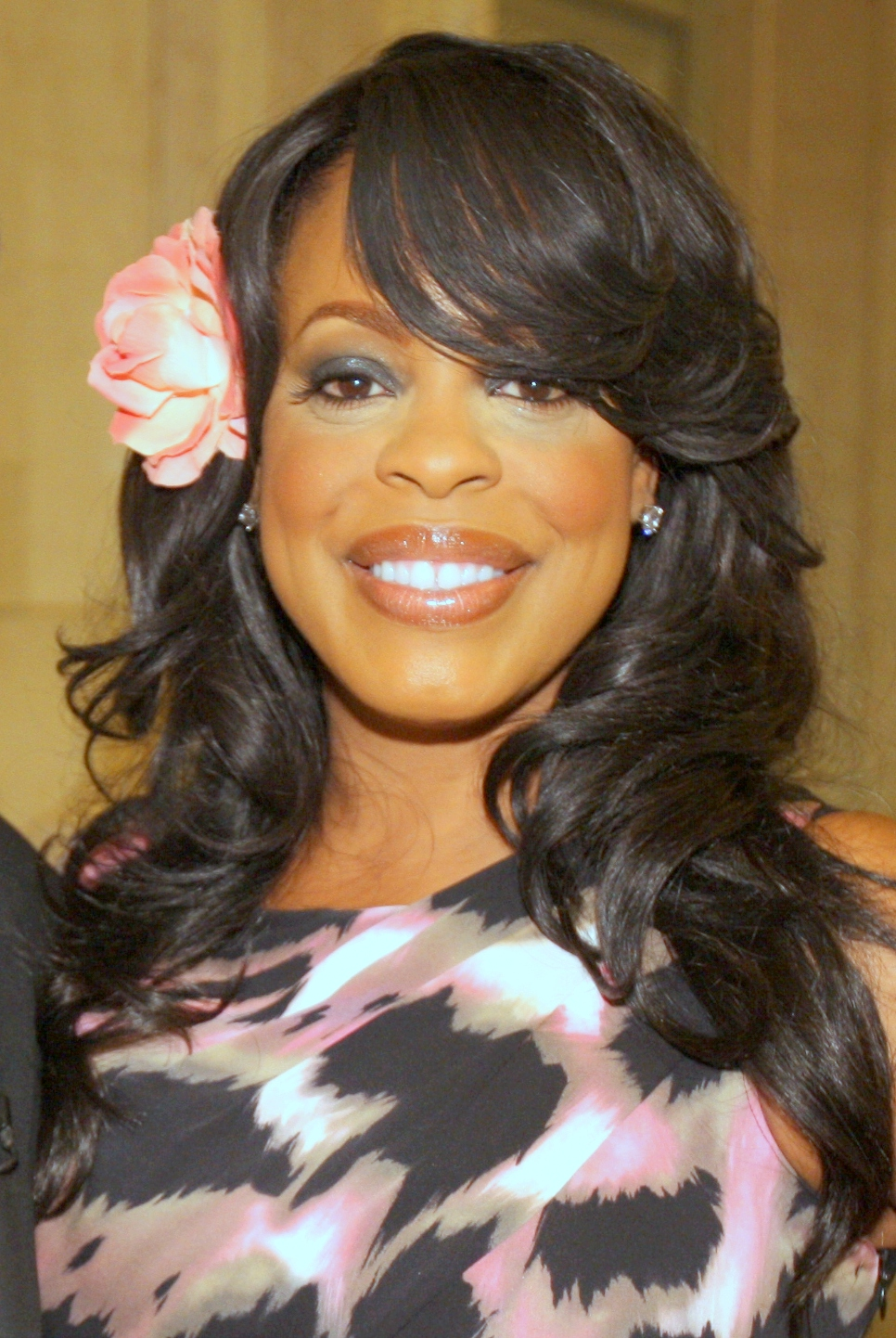
Niecy Nash-Betts, Outstanding Supporting Actress in a Limited or Anthology Series or Movie winner

The nominations for the 75th Primetime Emmy Awards were announced on July 12, 2023, in a virtual broadcast originating from the Hollywood Athletic Club in Hollywood, Los Angeles, hosted by actress Yvette Nicole Brown and Television Academy chair Frank Scherma. Including nominations at the 75th Primetime Creative Arts Emmy Awards, Succession led all programs with 27 nominations. The series received 14 acting nominations, tying its own record from the previous year. It also became the first series to receive three nominations for Outstanding Lead Actor in a Drama Series. The Last of Us became the first live-action video game adaptation to be nominated in major Emmy categories. (Note: Arcane previously won the Emmy for best animated program in 2022.) At age 20, for her performance in Wednesday, Jenna Ortega became the second-youngest nominee for Outstanding Lead Actress in a Comedy Series after Patty Duke for her role on her eponymous show. For his work on The Last of Us, Saturday Night Live, and Patagonia: Life on the Edge of the World, Pedro Pascal's three nominations made him the most-nominated Latino in a single year. Paris Barclay's nomination for Dahmer – Monster: The Jeffrey Dahmer Story made him the first Black director to be nominated in comedy, drama, and limited series categories. HBO and its streaming service Max led all networks and platforms with 127 nominations, and the two services became the first network with four Outstanding Drama Series nominees since NBC in 1992. Netflix came in second place with 103 nominations. Amazon Freevee and Tubi each earned their first nominations for Jury Duty and The Nevers, respectively.

The winners were announced on January 15, following the Creative Arts Emmys on January 6 and 7. Succession became the fourth program to win Outstanding Drama Series for its final season. Combined with its four Creative Arts Emmys, The Bear was the most awarded comedy in a single year with ten wins, breaking Schitt's Creek's record of nine from 2020. With 53 nominations and zero wins throughout its run, Better Call Saul became the most nominated program without a single win in Emmy history. By virtue of his win for Outstanding Variety Special (Live) for Elton John Live: Farewell From Dodger Stadium, Elton John became the 19th recipient of an EGOT. For her role on Abbott Elementary, Quinta Brunson became the first Black woman to win Outstanding Lead Actress in a Comedy Series since 1981 when Isabel Sanford won for The Jeffersons. Combined with Ayo Edebiri's win for Outstanding Supporting Actress in a Comedy Series for her role on The Bear, this marked the first time Black women won both comedy female acting categories in a single year. For her performance on Beef, Ali Wong became the first Asian woman to win an Emmy for a lead role category.

Winners are listed first, highlighted in boldface, and indicated with a double dagger (‡). (Note: The outlets listed for each program are the U.S. broadcasters or streaming services identified in the nominations, which for some international productions are different than the broadcaster(s) that originally commissioned the program. Programs broadcast by HBO or Max were listed under both services in the nominations list; only the original broadcaster is listed below.) For simplicity, producers who received nominations for program awards, as well as nominated writers for Outstanding Writing for a Variety Series, have been omitted.

=== Programs ===
Programs
**Outstanding Comedy Series**: **The Bear (FX)**‡; Abbott Elementary (ABC); Barry (HBO); Jury Duty (Amazon Freevee); The Marvelous Mrs. Maisel (Prime Video); Only Murders in the Building (Hulu); Ted Lasso (Apple TV+); Wednesday (Netflix)	**Outstanding Drama Series**: **Succession (HBO)**‡; Andor (Disney+); Better Call Saul (AMC); The Crown (Netflix); House of the Dragon (HBO); The Last of Us (HBO); The White Lotus (HBO); Yellowjackets (Showtime)
**Outstanding Limited or Anthology Series**: **Beef (Netflix)**‡; Dahmer – Monster: The Jeffrey Dahmer Story (Netflix); Daisy Jones & the Six (Prime Video); Fleishman Is in Trouble (FX); Obi-Wan Kenobi (Disney+)	**Outstanding Reality Competition Program**: **RuPaul's Drag Race (MTV)**‡; The Amazing Race (CBS); Survivor (CBS); Top Chef (Bravo); The Voice (NBC)
**Outstanding Talk Series**: **The Daily Show with Trevor Noah (Comedy Central)**‡; Jimmy Kimmel Live! (ABC); Late Night with Seth Meyers (NBC); The Late Show with Stephen Colbert (CBS); The Problem with Jon Stewart (Apple TV+)	**Outstanding Scripted Variety Series**: **Last Week Tonight with John Oliver (HBO)**‡; A Black Lady Sketch Show (HBO); Saturday Night Live (NBC)
**Outstanding Variety Special (Live)**: **Elton John Live: Farewell from Dodger Stadium (Disney+)**‡; The Apple Music Super Bowl LVII Halftime Show Starring Rihanna (Fox); Chris Rock: Selective Outrage (Netflix); The Oscars (ABC); 75th Annual Tony Awards (CBS)

=== Acting ===
==== Lead ====
Lead performances
**Outstanding Lead Actor in a Comedy Series**: **Jeremy Allen White – The Bear as Carmen "Carmy" Berzatto (FX)**‡; Bill Hader – Barry as Barry Berkman / Barry Block (HBO); Jason Segel – Shrinking as Jimmy Laird (Apple TV+); Martin Short – Only Murders in the Building as Oliver Putnam (Hulu); Jason Sudeikis – Ted Lasso as Ted Lasso (Apple TV+)	**Outstanding Lead Actress in a Comedy Series**: **Quinta Brunson – Abbott Elementary as Janine Teagues (ABC)**‡; Christina Applegate – Dead to Me as Jen Harding (Netflix); Rachel Brosnahan – The Marvelous Mrs. Maisel as Miriam "Midge" Maisel (Prime Video); Natasha Lyonne – Poker Face as Charlie Cale (Peacock); Jenna Ortega – Wednesday as Wednesday Addams / Goody Addams (Netflix)
**Outstanding Lead Actor in a Drama Series**: **Kieran Culkin – Succession as Roman Roy (HBO)**‡; Jeff Bridges – The Old Man as Dan Chase (FX); Brian Cox – Succession as Logan Roy (HBO); Bob Odenkirk – Better Call Saul as Jimmy McGill / Saul Goodman / Gene Takavic (AMC); Pedro Pascal – The Last of Us as Joel Miller (HBO); Jeremy Strong – Succession as Kendall Roy (HBO)	**Outstanding Lead Actress in a Drama Series**: **Sarah Snook – Succession as Shiv Roy (HBO)**‡; Sharon Horgan – Bad Sisters as Eva Garvey (Apple TV+); Melanie Lynskey – Yellowjackets as Shauna Sadecki (Showtime); Elisabeth Moss – The Handmaid's Tale as June Osborne / Offred (Hulu); Bella Ramsey – The Last of Us as Ellie (HBO); Keri Russell – The Diplomat as Kate Wyler (Netflix)
**Outstanding Lead Actor in a Limited or Anthology Series or Movie**: **Steven Yeun – Beef as Danny Cho (Netflix)**‡; Taron Egerton – Black Bird as Jimmy Keene (Apple TV+); Kumail Nanjiani – Welcome to Chippendales as Somen "Steve" Banerjee (Hulu); Evan Peters – Dahmer – Monster: The Jeffrey Dahmer Story as Jeffrey Dahmer (Netflix); Daniel Radcliffe – Weird: The Al Yankovic Story as "Weird Al" Yankovic (The Roku Channel); Michael Shannon – George & Tammy as George Jones (Showtime)	**Outstanding Lead Actress in a Limited or Anthology Series or Movie**: **Ali Wong – Beef as Amy Lau (Netflix)**‡; Lizzy Caplan – Fleishman Is in Trouble as Libby Epstein (FX); Jessica Chastain – George & Tammy as Tammy Wynette (Showtime); Dominique Fishback – Swarm as Andrea "Dre" Greene (Prime Video); Kathryn Hahn – Tiny Beautiful Things as Clare Pierce (Hulu); Riley Keough – Daisy Jones & the Six as Daisy Jones (Prime Video)

==== Supporting ====
Supporting performances
**Outstanding Supporting Actor in a Comedy Series**: **Ebon Moss-Bachrach – The Bear as Richard "Richie" Jerimovich (FX)**‡; Anthony Carrigan – Barry as NoHo Hank (HBO); Phil Dunster – Ted Lasso as Jamie Tartt (Apple TV+); Brett Goldstein – Ted Lasso as Roy Kent (Apple TV+); James Marsden – Jury Duty as Himself (Amazon Freevee); Tyler James Williams – Abbott Elementary as Gregory Eddie (ABC); Henry Winkler – Barry as Gene Cousineau (HBO)	**Outstanding Supporting Actress in a Comedy Series**: **Ayo Edebiri – The Bear as Sydney Adamu (FX)**‡; Alex Borstein – The Marvelous Mrs. Maisel as Susie Myerson (Prime Video); Janelle James – Abbott Elementary as Ava Coleman (ABC); Sheryl Lee Ralph – Abbott Elementary as Barbara Howard (ABC); Juno Temple – Ted Lasso as Keeley Jones (Apple TV+); Hannah Waddingham – Ted Lasso as Rebecca Welton (Apple TV+); Jessica Williams – Shrinking as Gaby (Apple TV+)
**Outstanding Supporting Actor in a Drama Series**: **Matthew Macfadyen – Succession as Tom Wambsgans (HBO)**‡; F. Murray Abraham – The White Lotus as Bert Di Grasso (HBO); Nicholas Braun – Succession as Greg Hirsch (HBO); Michael Imperioli – The White Lotus as Dominic Di Grasso (HBO); Theo James – The White Lotus as Cameron Sullivan (HBO); Alan Ruck – Succession as Connor Roy (HBO); Will Sharpe – The White Lotus as Ethan Spiller (HBO); Alexander Skarsgård – Succession as Lukas Matsson (HBO)	**Outstanding Supporting Actress in a Drama Series**: **Jennifer Coolidge – The White Lotus as Tanya McQuoid-Hunt (HBO)**‡; Elizabeth Debicki – The Crown as Princess Diana (Netflix); Meghann Fahy – The White Lotus as Daphne Sullivan (HBO); Sabrina Impacciatore – The White Lotus as Valentina (HBO); Aubrey Plaza – The White Lotus as Harper Spiller (HBO); Rhea Seehorn – Better Call Saul as Kim Wexler (AMC); J. Smith-Cameron – Succession as Gerri Kellman (HBO); Simona Tabasco – The White Lotus as Lucia Greco (HBO)
**Outstanding Supporting Actor in a Limited or Anthology Series or Movie**: **Paul Walter Hauser – Black Bird as Larry Hall (Apple TV+)**‡; Murray Bartlett – Welcome to Chippendales as Nick De Noia (Hulu); Richard Jenkins – Dahmer – Monster: The Jeffrey Dahmer Story as Lionel Dahmer (Netflix); Joseph Lee – Beef as George Nakai (Netflix); Ray Liotta – Black Bird as James "Big Jim" Keene (Apple TV+) (posthumous); Young Mazino – Beef as Paul Cho (Netflix); Jesse Plemons – Love & Death as Allan Gore (Max)	**Outstanding Supporting Actress in a Limited or Anthology Series or Movie**: **Niecy Nash-Betts – Dahmer – Monster: The Jeffrey Dahmer Story as Glenda Cleveland (Netflix)**‡; Annaleigh Ashford – Welcome to Chippendales as Irene Banerjee (Hulu); Maria Bello – Beef as Jordan Forster (Netflix); Claire Danes – Fleishman Is in Trouble as Rachel Fleishman (FX); Juliette Lewis – Welcome to Chippendales as Denise (Hulu); Camila Morrone – Daisy Jones & the Six as Camila Alvarez (Prime Video); Merritt Wever – Tiny Beautiful Things as Frankie Pierce (Hulu)

=== Directing ===
Directing
**Outstanding Directing for a Comedy Series**: **The Bear: "Review" – Christopher Storer (FX)**‡; Barry: "wow" – Bill Hader (HBO); The Marvelous Mrs. Maisel: "Four Minutes" – Amy Sherman-Palladino (Prime Video); The Ms. Pat Show: "Don't Touch My Hair" – Mary Lou Belli (BET+); Ted Lasso: "So Long, Farewell" – Declan Lowney (Apple TV+); Wednesday: "Wednesday's Child Is Full of Woe" – Tim Burton (Netflix)	**Outstanding Directing for a Drama Series**: **Succession: "Connor's Wedding" – Mark Mylod (HBO)**‡; Andor: "Rix Road" – Benjamin Caron (Disney+); Bad Sisters: "The Prick" – Dearbhla Walsh (Apple TV+); The Last of Us: "Long, Long Time" – Peter Hoar (HBO); Succession: "America Decides" – Andrij Parekh (HBO); Succession: "Living+" – Lorene Scafaria (HBO); The White Lotus: "Arrivederci" – Mike White (HBO)
**Outstanding Directing for a Limited or Anthology Series or Movie**: **Beef: "Figures of Light" – Lee Sung Jin (Netflix)**‡; Beef: "The Great Fabricator" – Jake Schreier (Netflix); Dahmer – Monster: The Jeffrey Dahmer Story: "Bad Meat" – Carl Franklin (Netflix); Dahmer – Monster: The Jeffrey Dahmer Story: "Silenced" – Paris Barclay (Netflix); Fleishman Is in Trouble: "Me-Time" – Jonathan Dayton and Valerie Faris (FX); Prey – Dan Trachtenberg (Hulu)

=== Writing ===
Writing
**Outstanding Writing for a Comedy Series**: **The Bear: "System" – Christopher Storer (FX)**‡; Barry: "wow" – Bill Hader (HBO); Jury Duty: "Ineffective Assistance" – Mekki Leeper (Amazon Freevee); Only Murders in the Building: "I Know Who Did It" – John Hoffman, Matteo Borghese, and Rob Turbovsky (Hulu); The Other Two: "Cary & Brooke Go to an AIDS Play" – Chris Kelly and Sarah Schneider (Max); Ted Lasso: "So Long, Farewell" – Brendan Hunt, Joe Kelly, and Jason Sudeikis (Apple TV+)	**Outstanding Writing for a Drama Series**: **Succession: "Connor's Wedding" – Jesse Armstrong (HBO)**‡; Andor: "One Way Out" – Beau Willimon (Disney+); Bad Sisters: "The Prick" – Sharon Horgan, Dave Finkel, and Brett Baer (Apple TV+); Better Call Saul: "Point and Shoot" – Gordon Smith (AMC); Better Call Saul: "Saul Gone" – Peter Gould (AMC); The Last of Us: "Long, Long Time" – Craig Mazin (HBO); The White Lotus: "Arrivederci" – Mike White (HBO)
**Outstanding Writing for a Limited or Anthology Series or Movie**: **Beef: "The Birds Don't Sing, They Screech in Pain" – Lee Sung Jin (Netflix)**‡; Fire Island – Joel Kim Booster (Hulu); Fleishman Is in Trouble: "Me-Time" – Taffy Brodesser-Akner (FX); Prey – Patrick Aison and Dan Trachtenberg (Hulu); Swarm: "Stung" – Janine Nabers and Donald Glover (Prime Video); Weird: The Al Yankovic Story – Al Yankovic and Eric Appel (The Roku Channel)	**Outstanding Writing for a Variety Series**: **Last Week Tonight with John Oliver (HBO)**‡; The Daily Show with Trevor Noah (Comedy Central); Late Night with Seth Meyers (NBC); The Late Show with Stephen Colbert (CBS); Saturday Night Live (NBC)

=== Governors Award ===
The Governors Award was presented to the media monitoring and advocacy organization GLAAD in recognition of its work "over nearly four decades to secure fair, accurate and diverse representation of the LGBTQ community in the media and entertainment industries and to advocate for LGBTQ equality." GLAAD's president and CEO, Sarah Kate Ellis, accepted the honor on the organization's behalf during the Primetime Emmy telecast.

=== Nominations and wins by program ===
For the purposes of the lists below, "major" constitutes the categories listed above (program, acting, directing, and writing), while "total" includes the categories presented at the Creative Arts Emmy Awards. Programs and networks must have multiple wins or major nominations or at least five total nominations to be included.

Programs with multiple nominations
Nominations		Program	Network
Total	Major	Program	Network
27	14	Succession	HBO
24	5	The Last of Us	HBO
23	12	The White Lotus	HBO
21	8	Ted Lasso	Apple TV+
14	4	The Marvelous Mrs. Maisel	Prime Video
13	9	Beef	Netflix
13	6	The Bear	FX
13	6	Dahmer – Monster: The Jeffrey Dahmer Story	Netflix
12	3	Wednesday	Netflix
11	6	Barry	HBO
11	3	Only Murders in the Building	Hulu
9	3	Daisy Jones & the Six	Prime Video
9	2	Saturday Night Live	NBC
9	0	The Mandalorian	Disney+
8	5	Abbott Elementary	ABC
8	3	Andor	Disney+
8	2	Weird: The Al Yankovic Story	The Roku Channel
8	1	House of the Dragon	HBO
7	5	Better Call Saul	AMC
7	5	Fleishman Is in Trouble	FX
7	1	RuPaul's Drag Race	MTV
7	0	Guillermo del Toro's Cabinet of Curiosities	Netflix
7	0	Still: A Michael J. Fox Movie	Apple TV+
6	2	The Crown	Netflix
6	2	Prey	Hulu
6	0	The Lord of the Rings: The Rings of Power	Prime Video
6	0	100 Foot Wave	HBO
6	0	Queer Eye	Netflix
6	0	Stranger Things	Netflix
6	0	Welcome to Wrexham	FX
5	4	Welcome to Chippendales	Hulu
5	1	The Apple Music Super Bowl LVII Halftime Show Starring Rihanna	Fox
5	1	Obi-Wan Kenobi	Disney+
5	1	Top Chef	Bravo
5	0	Carol Burnett: 90 Years of Laughter + Love	NBC
5	0	Moonage Daydream	HBO
<5	3	Bad Sisters	Apple TV+
<5	3	Black Bird	Apple TV+
<5	3	Jury Duty	Amazon Freevee
<5	2	The Daily Show with Trevor Noah	Comedy Central
<5	2	George & Tammy	Showtime
<5	2	Last Week Tonight with John Oliver	HBO
<5	2	Late Night with Seth Meyers	NBC
<5	2	The Late Show with Stephen Colbert	CBS
<5	2	Shrinking	Apple TV+
<5	2	Swarm	Prime Video
<5	2	Tiny Beautiful Things	Hulu
<5	2	Yellowjackets	Showtime

Programs with multiple wins
Wins		Program	Network
Total	Major	Program	Network
10	6	The Bear	FX
8	5	Beef	Netflix
8	0	The Last of Us	HBO
6		Succession	HBO
5	1	The White Lotus	HBO
5	0	Welcome to Wrexham	FX
4	0	Still: A Michael J. Fox Movie	Apple TV+
4	0	Wednesday	Netflix
3	1	Elton John Live: Farewell from Dodger Stadium	Disney+
3	1	RuPaul's Drag Race	MTV
3	0	Dancing with the Stars	Disney+
2	2	Last Week Tonight with John Oliver	HBO
2	1	Black Bird	Apple TV+
2	0	The Apple Music Super Bowl LVII Halftime Show Starring Rihanna	Fox
2	0	Beauty and the Beast: A 30th Celebration	ABC
2	0	Daisy Jones & the Six	Prime Video
2	0	I Think You Should Leave with Tim Robinson	Netflix
2	0	The Marvelous Mrs. Maisel	Prime Video
2	0	Moonage Daydream	HBO
2	0	Saturday Night Live	NBC
2	0	The Simpsons	Fox
2	0	Ted Lasso	Apple TV+
2	0	We're Here	HBO
2	0	Weird: The Al Yankovic Story	The Roku Channel

=== Nominations and wins by network ===
Networks with multiple nominations
Nominations		Network
Total	Major	Network
127	43	HBO / Max
103	23	Netflix
54	17	Apple TV+
42	13	Hulu
42	9	Prime Video
40	5	Disney+
37	12	FX
28	7	ABC
27	5	NBC
20	5	CBS
12	2	The Roku Channel
11	1	Fox
9	1	MTV
8	5	AMC
8	4	Showtime
8	1	Peacock
8	0	National Geographic
7	1	Bravo
7	0	CNN
7	0	Paramount+
6	0	PBS
5	2	Comedy Central
<5	3	Amazon Freevee

Networks with multiple wins
Wins		Network
Total	Major	Network
31	9	HBO / Max
22	6	Netflix
16	6	FX
10	1	Apple TV+
9	1	Disney+
6	0	Prime Video
5	0	NBC
4	1	ABC
4	0	Fox
4	0	Hulu
3	1	MTV
2	0	PBS
2	0	Peacock
2	0	The Roku Channel

== Presenters ==
The awards were presented by the following people:

Presenters at the ceremony
Name(s)	Role
Christina Applegate	Presented the award for Outstanding Supporting Actress in a Comedy Series
Carol Burnett	Presented the award for Outstanding Lead Actress in a Comedy Series
Lorraine Bracco; Michael Imperioli	Presented the award for Outstanding Supporting Actress in a Drama Series
Pedro Pascal	Presented the award for Outstanding Supporting Actor in a Drama Series
Jon Cryer; Holland Taylor	Presented the award for Outstanding Supporting Actor in a Comedy Series
Tichina Arnold; Tisha Campbell; Martin Lawrence; Carl Anthony Payne II	Presented the award for Outstanding Lead Actor in a Comedy Series
Stephen Colbert; Taylor Tomlinson	Presented the award for Outstanding Scripted Variety Series
Quinta Brunson; Marla Gibbs	Presented the award for Outstanding Supporting Actress in a Limited or Anthology Series or Movie
Ted Danson; Kelsey Grammer; Rhea Perlman; John Ratzenberger; George Wendt	Presented the awards for Outstanding Directing for a Comedy Series and Outstanding Writing for a Comedy Series
Joel McHale; Ken Jeong	Presented the award for Outstanding Reality Competition Program
Arsenio Hall	Presented the award for Outstanding Writing for a Variety Series
Charlie Day; Danny DeVito; Glenn Howerton; Rob McElhenney; Kaitlin Olson	Presented the award for Outstanding Talk Series
Brett Goldstein; Juno Temple	Presented the award for Outstanding Directing for a Limited or Anthology Series or Movie
Justin Chambers; Katherine Heigl; James Pickens Jr.; Ellen Pompeo; Chandra Wilson	Presented the award for Outstanding Supporting Actor in a Limited or Anthology Series or Movie
Jon Hamm	Presented the award for Outstanding Writing for a Drama Series
Tom Hiddleston; Ke Huy Quan	Presented the award for Outstanding Writing for a Limited or Anthology Series or Movie
Jason Bateman	Presented the award for Outstanding Directing for a Drama Series
Tina Fey; Amy Poehler	Presented the award for Outstanding Variety Special (Live)
Dylan McDermott	Presented the award for Outstanding Lead Actor in a Limited or Anthology Series or Movie
Jenna Ortega; Sheryl Lee Ralph	Presented the award for Outstanding Lead Actress in a Limited or Anthology Series or Movie
Joan Collins; Taraji P. Henson	Presented the award for Outstanding Limited or Anthology Series
Colman Domingo; Hannah Waddingham	Presented the Governors Award to GLAAD
Rob Reiner; Sally Struthers	Presented the In Memoriam segment
Gil Bellows; Calista Flockhart; Greg Germann; Peter MacNicol	Presented the award for Outstanding Lead Actor in a Drama Series
Jodie Foster	Presented the award for Outstanding Lead Actress in a Drama Series
Natasha Lyonne; Tracee Ellis Ross	Presented the award for Outstanding Comedy Series
Peter Dinklage	Presented the award for Outstanding Drama Series

== Ceremony information ==
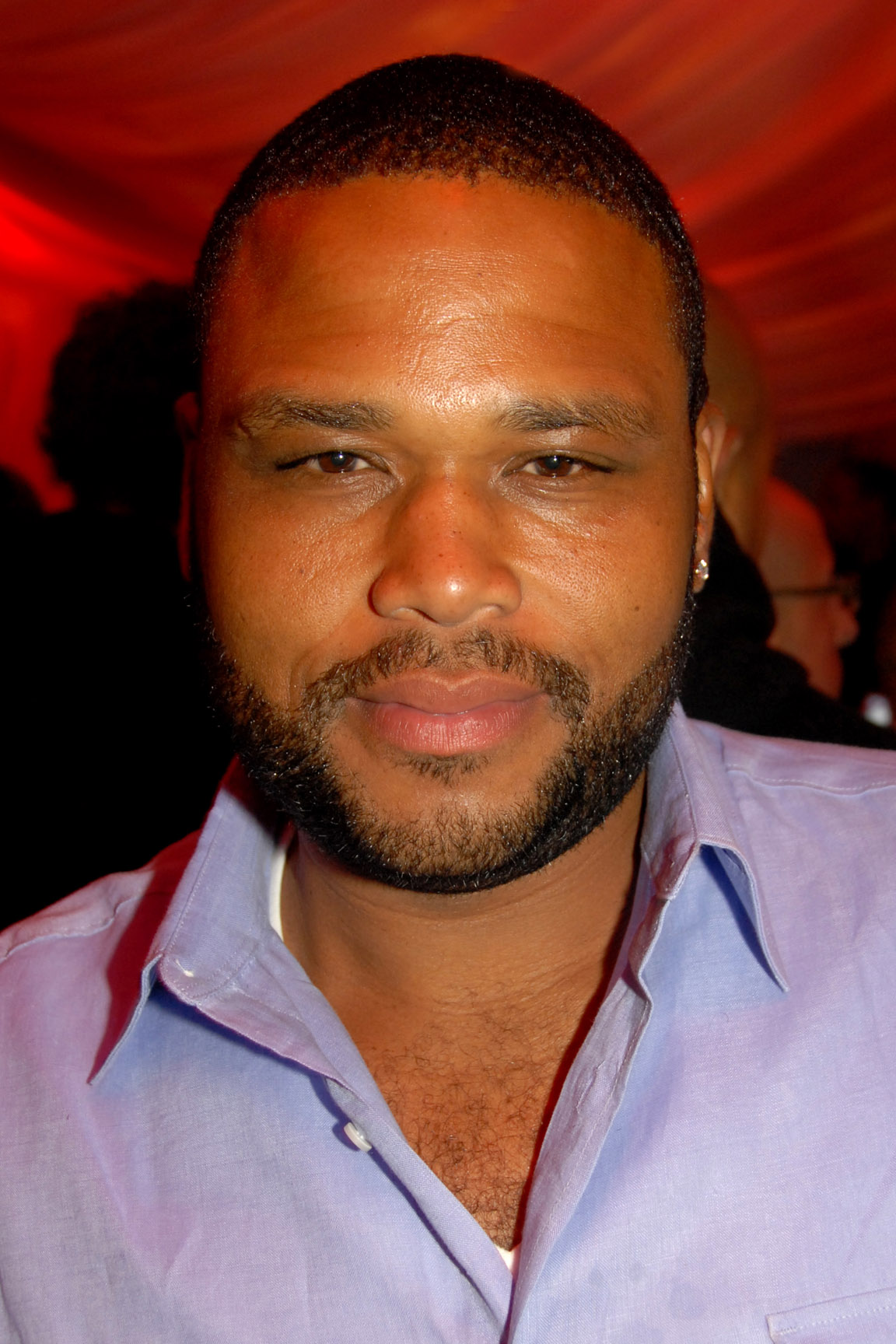
Anthony Anderson hosted the ceremony.

In February 2023, the Academy of Television Arts & Sciences (also known as the Television Academy) and broadcaster Fox announced the 75th Primetime Emmy Awards would be held on September 18, with the Creative Arts ceremonies on September 9 and 10. This marked the second straight year that the ceremony was scheduled for a Monday; while it was described as an "unusual" move, since only NBC typically aired the Emmys on Mondays since 2014 (due to NBC Sunday Night Football), it would prevent the broadcast from interfering with potential overruns by Fox's Sunday afternoon football coverage. The ceremony was produced by Jesse Collins Entertainment, taking over for Done and Dusted and Hudlin Entertainment, with Jesse Collins, Dionne Harmon, and Jeannae Rouzan-Clay serving as producers.

Due to the 2023 Writers Guild of America strike that began on May 2, 2023, the Television Academy allowed companies to cancel scheduled For Your Consideration events without penalty. Members of the Writers Guild of America (WGA) were also told to not attend promotional events while the strike was ongoing. The 2023 SAG-AFTRA strike then began on July 14. The Television Academy reportedly planned to postpone the ceremony should either strike continue into August (following the postponement of the 50th Daytime Emmy Awards, which was originally scheduled earlier for June 16). The last time the Primetime Emmys were delayed was in 2001 following the September 11 attacks. The Television Academy first told vendors in late July that the ceremony would be delayed, though no official announcement was made at the time. According to several reports, the Television Academy preferred a November makeup date, while Fox preferred a January date due to fall broadcast commitments.

On August 10, the ceremony was officially rescheduled for January 15, 2024, falling on the Martin Luther King Jr. Day holiday. The final round of voting still occurred in late August as scheduled. Anthony Anderson was announced as the host on December 13. Alex Rudzinski and Rick Kimbrel served as director and musical supervisor for the ceremony, respectively. Instead of utilizing play-off music, Anderson's mother, Doris Bowman, reminded award recipients when their time was up to end their acceptance speeches. Blink-182 drummer Travis Barker made an appearance during the telecast's opening segment playing Phil Collins's song "In the Air Tonight".

In honor of the Emmys' 75th anniversary, producers Collins, Harmon, and Rouzan-Clay announced that the ceremony would feature cast reunions or recreations of memorable moments from popular television series throughout history. In an interview with Variety, Rouzan-Clay elaborated on the segments saying, "I think they'll be talking about the ones that they may see on the screen. Those are going to be a big talking point, a big watercooler moment, if you will. It was a grand task to figure out how to celebrate 75 years of television. If we can bring some nostalgia to that stage, then I think that we've done a good deed." Among the television series that were honored were All in the Family, Ally McBeal, Cheers, Grey's Anatomy, and The Sopranos. The statuettes for these ceremonies also featured the number 75 etched in the base.

=== Category and rule changes ===
In June 2022, the Television Academy announced the elimination of the "hanging episode" rule for the 2023 ceremony. In previous years, episodes that aired after the May 31 eligibility deadline but before nominations voting began could be placed on a Television Academy platform for viewing. Following the rule change, all episodes must air for a national audience by May 31, or those episodes will be moved to the following ceremony; if the program does not air a new season in that following year, the episodes would be eligible for individual achievement awards only.

Following a realignment between the Primetime Emmy Awards and Daytime Emmy Awards for the 2022 ceremonies, the Television Academy and the National Academy of Television Arts and Sciences announced in August 2022 that game shows would move to the primetime ceremony. New categories include Outstanding Game Show and Outstanding Host for a Game Show. To accommodate the change, the eligibility window for game shows spanned from January 1, 2022, to May 31, 2023. Additionally, to avoid confusion over where programs qualify, Outstanding Competition Program was renamed to Outstanding Reality Competition Program. Game shows featuring children as contestants are eligible for the Children's and Family Emmy Awards only.

More rule changes were announced in December 2022. Most notably, the variety categories were rearranged, with Outstanding Variety Talk Series and Outstanding Variety Sketch Series becoming Outstanding Talk Series and Outstanding Scripted Variety Series. The first category covers programs focused on "unscripted interviews or panel discussions between a host/hosts and guest celebrities or personalities", while the second covers those that "consist of discrete scenes, musical numbers, monologues, comedy stand-ups, sketches, etc." The move was seen as an attempt to resolve the dwindling number of variety sketch series and to separate news-focused programs from more variety-focused talk shows; the existing categories were initially merged in late 2020 before being split again a few months later. Other changes included caps on nominations-round voting and changes to tracked categories.

Categories to be shown during the main broadcast were originally set in November 2023, with Outstanding Variety Special (Live) replacing Outstanding Writing for a Variety Special and Outstanding Writing for a Variety Series (which had rotated from year to year). Following pushback from the WGA, the Outstanding Writing for a Variety Series category was added back to the broadcast.

=== Critical reviews and viewership ===
The broadcast received generally positive reviews from critics. Aramide Tinubu of Variety wrote, "The heartfelt tone and attention to detail made the 75th Primetime Emmys a joy to watch. If Jesse Collins Entertainment wished to produce a flawless awards show, they got pretty damn close." She also commended the segments paying tribute to past television programs noting, "It was fabulous to see these distinguished casts reunite all these years later." The Boston Globe television critic Matthew Gilbert quipped, "It was a relief to get an old-fashioned Emmy Awards show, one not straining to be snarkier than thou or heavily meme-able." He also contrasted the show with the previous week's Golden Globes ceremony saying the Emmys were "a straightforward and largely sincere telecast" compared to the Globes. The Hollywood Reporter's Daniel Fienberg said that despite having a repeat slate of winners and being held in an unfavorable time slot, "They made a good awards show, a smartly produced telecast that was crafted with the tacit acknowledgment that they couldn't count on this slate of winners to carry the night in a deeply satisfying way. The producers knew they had to have actual ideas for how to fill three hours and, in that, they generally succeeded."

Alan Sepinwall of Rolling Stone was more critical of the ceremony, noting that some of the segments honoring past television shows did not work and saying, "Putting Anderson into the rubber suit from American Horror Story Season One was sweaty on multiple levels, and Peter Dinklage looked miserable paraphrasing some of his Game of Thrones finale dialogue while presenting the night's final award to Succession." NPR's Linda Holmes commented that the decision to let Bowman interrupt Jennifer Coolidge's acceptance speech was "terribly awkward". Columnist Ben Travers of IndieWire reserved praise for host Anderson and the winners' emotional acceptance speeches, but criticized some production decisions writing, "Why did the Curb Your Enthusiasm theme serve as a lead-in for the Cheers reunion? Why am I expecting to see David Duchovny and Gillian Anderson on stage after The X-Files music hits, only to then hear Don Draper cracking jokes?"

Competing with the 2023–24 NFL playoffs on ABC and ESPN and cable news coverage of the Iowa Republican caucuses, the ceremony averaged 4.46 million viewers, making it the least-viewed in Emmys history, representing about a 25% decrease over the previous ceremony in 2022. It achieved a 0.87 rating among adults ages 18–49.

== In Memoriam ==
Rob Reiner and Sally Struthers introduced the annual In Memoriam segment, which included a special tribute to All in the Family creator Norman Lear, and featured Charlie Puth and The War and Treaty performing a medley of "See You Again" and "I'll Be There for You".

- Adan Canto – performer
- Richard Roundtree – performer
- Mark Margolis – performer
- Annie Wersching – performer
- Eugene Lee – production designer
- Ron Taylor – executive
- Gabrielle Beaumont – director
- David Jacobs – writer
- Angela Lansbury – performer
- Stephen "tWitch" Boss – choreographer
- Richard Belzer – performer
- Ron Cephas Jones – performer
- Treat Williams – performer
- Angus Cloud – performer
- Lance Reddick – performer
- Suzanne Somers – performer
- John Beasley – performer
- Bruce Gowers – director
- Chris Ledesma – music editor
- Jules Bass – producer
- Budd Friedman – producer
- Deborah Barak – executive
- Thomas W. Sarnoff – executive
- Manny Coto – writer
- David Davis – writer
- Phyllis Carlyle – manager
- Lloyd Morrisett – executive
- Hector Ramirez – camera operator
- Leslie Jordan – performer
- Jim Brown – performer
- David McCallum – performer
- Len Goodman – panelist
- Cindy Williams – performer
- Bob Barker – host
- Paul Reubens – performer
- Tommy Smothers – performer
- Irene Cara – performer
- Kirstie Alley – performer
- Andre Braugher – performer
- Harry Belafonte – performer
- Alan Arkin – performer
- Barbara Walters – journalist
- Matthew Perry – performer
