= List of Irish restaurants =

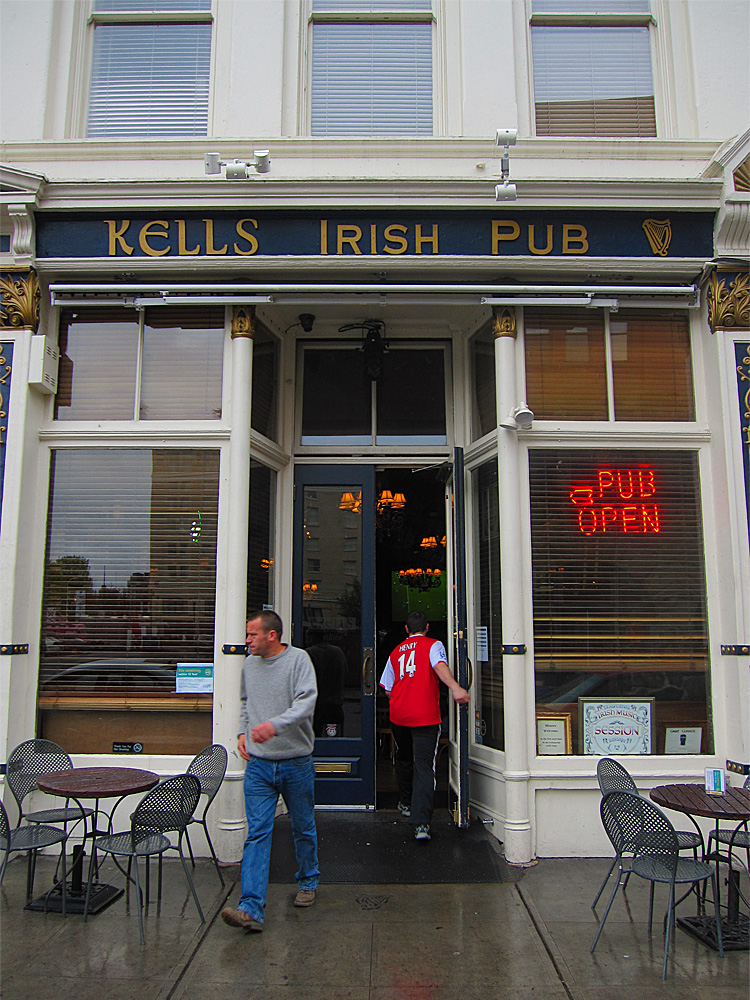
Kells Irish Pub, Portland, Oregon, U.S.

This is a list of notable restaurants that have served Irish cuisine:

- Beef O'Brady's
- Bennigan's
- Costello's
- Dorrian's Red Hand Restaurant, New York City
- Kells Irish Pub, Portland, Oregon, U.S.
- Kildare's Irish Pub
- Leaky Roof Gastropub
- McSorley's Old Ale House
- Neary's
- O'Neill's
- Raven & Rose, Portland, Oregon
