= Fleishman Is in Trouble (miniseries) =

2022 American drama television miniseries

- Promotional poster
- Genre: Drama
- Created by: Taffy Brodesser-Akner
- Based on: Fleishman Is in Trouble by Taffy Brodesser-Akner
- Written by: Taffy Brodesser-Akner; Mike Goldbach
- Directed by: Valerie Faris Jonathan Dayton; Alice Wu; Shari Springer Berman Robert Pulcini
- Starring: Jesse Eisenberg; Claire Danes; Lizzy Caplan; Adam Brody; Meara Mahoney Gross; Maxim Swinton
- Narrated by: Lizzy Caplan
- Composer: Caroline Shaw
- Country of origin: United States
- Original language: English
- No. of episodes: 8

Production
- Executive producers: Taffy Brodesser-Akner; Sarah Timberman; Carl Beverly; Susannah Grant; Valerie Faris; Jonathan Dayton; Robert Pulcini; Shari Springer Berman
- Producer: Anne M. Uemura
- Production location: New York City
- Cinematography: Corey Walter; Tim Orr
- Editors: Jeffrey M. Werner; Josh Beal; Jacquelyn Le
- Running time: 43–67 minutes
- Production companies: AknerCorp; Timberman/Beverly Productions; ABC Signature

Original release
- Network: FX on Hulu
- Release: November 17 – December 29, 2022

Fleishman Is in Trouble is an American drama television miniseries created by Taffy Brodesser-Akner, based on her 2019 novel. It stars Jesse Eisenberg, Claire Danes, Lizzy Caplan, Adam Brody, Meara Mahoney Gross, and Maxim Swinton. The series follows a recently divorced Manhattan hepatologist trying to navigate his new single life when his ex-wife suddenly disappears, leaving him to care for their two children.

The series aired on FX on Hulu from November 17 to December 29, 2022, consisting of eight episodes. It was met with positive reviews from critics and received seven nominations at the 75th Primetime Emmy Awards, including Outstanding Limited or Anthology Series and acting nominations for Danes and Caplan.

== Premise ==
Toby Fleishman is a recently divorced hepatologist in his early 40s using dating apps for the first time. As he begins to find romantic success he never achieved in his youth, his ex-wife Rachel disappears without a trace after leaving him with their children, Hannah and Solly. While Toby juggles looking after his children, a possible job promotion, and all the potential sexual partners in Manhattan, he realizes that he will never be able to figure out what happened to his wife until he can be more honest about what happened to their marriage in the first place.

== Cast and characters ==
=== Main ===
- Jesse Eisenberg as Toby Fleishman, a recently divorced Jewish hepatologist
- Claire Danes as Rachel Fleishman, a talent agent and Toby's ex-wife
- Lizzy Caplan as Libby Epstein, a magazine writer turned suburban housewife and one of Toby's best friends, who serves as the narrator of the story
- Adam Brody as Seth Morris, one of Toby's best friends
- Meara Mahoney Gross as Hannah Fleishman, Toby and Rachel's 12-year-old daughter
- Maxim Swinton as Solly Fleishman, Toby and Rachel's 9-year-old son

=== Recurring ===
- Josh Stamberg as Sam Rothberg, a vice president at a pharmaceutical company
- Ashley Austin Morris as Roxanne Hertz, one of Rachel's wealthy friends
- Jenny Powers as Miriam Rothberg, one of Rachel's wealthy friends and Sam's wife
- Joy Suprano as Cyndi Leffer, one of Rachel's wealthy friends
- Eric William Morris as Todd Leffer, Cyndi's husband
- Ralph Adriel Johnson as Phillip, a resident doctor at Toby's hospital
- Brian Miskell as Clay, a resident doctor at Toby's hospital
- Ava Yaghmaie as Joanie, a resident doctor at Toby's hospital
- Josh Radnor as Adam Epstein, Libby's husband
- Mozhan Marnò as Nahid, a woman whom Toby meets on a dating app
- Frances Li as Vanessa, Seth's girlfriend and later fiancée
- Joe Tuttle as Glenn, Libby's editor

=== Guest ===
- Juani Feliz as Alejandra Lopez, a Broadway star and Rachel's client
- Zack Robidas as Rick Hertz, Roxanne's husband
- Tara Summers as Tess, a woman with whom Toby has a brief casual relationship
- Michael Gaston as Dr. Bartuck, Toby's overbearing boss at the hospital
- J. Smith-Cameron as Barbara Hiller, Toby's lawyer who advises him during his divorce proceedings
- Christian Slater as Archer Sylvan, a prolific author at the magazine Libby used to work for

== Episodes ==
No.	Title	Directed by	Teleplay by	Original release date
1	"Summon Your Witnesses"	Valerie Faris & Jonathan Dayton	Taffy Brodesser-Akner	November 17, 2022
In the summer of 2016, Toby Fleishman, a Jewish hepatologist in his early 40s living in Manhattan, signs up for a dating app following his recent divorce from Rachel, a talent agent and his spouse of 15 years, and begins having frequent, casual sex. On advice from his therapist, he reconnects with his old college friends Libby and Seth, whom he met in a study abroad program in Jerusalem and had not seen since the first years of his marriage. Rachel drops off their children—Hannah, who resents Toby for the divorce, and Solly, who conversely idolizes Toby and seeks his help on his science fair project—at Toby's apartment a day early, compelling him to leave them with their babysitter Mona while he goes on a date and has sex with a woman named Tess. The next day, Rachel does not show up to pick up the children or respond to any of Toby's calls. Tess arrives to again have sex with Toby but believes she is being put on when she sees his children, and storms out. Libby, happily married, realizes she is envious of Toby rediscovering himself in the wake of his separation.
2	"Welcome to Paniquil"	Alice Wu	Taffy Brodesser-Akner	November 17, 2022
Toby fires Mona after he realizes that Solly used his computer to look up pornography, and takes them to Rachel's house in the Hamptons when she does not show up to take them. He is ejected from the property when the new housekeeper does not recognize him, causing him to have an epiphany about moving on in the wake of his divorce. He finally gets Hannah a cell phone and sends the children to summer camp, taking his time off to meet with Libby and Seth in Central Park. While talking about Rachel, Libby inadvertently plants an idea in his head that the reason for her silence could be that she is in danger, and leaves in a panic, only to encounter her friends at a grocery store, who tell him that they saw her napping in the park.
3	"Free Pass"	Valerie Faris & Jonathan Dayton	Mike Goldbach	November 24, 2022
In flashbacks, after meeting at a college party, Toby and Rachel fall in love and get married, although their respective professional successes and contrasting worldviews slowly drive a wedge between them. As Rachel gives birth to Hannah, the substitute doctor breaks her water without her consent. Believing that she was sexually assaulted, Rachel develops postpartum depression until Toby hires a nanny. As she starts her own theater talent agency, Rachel becomes increasingly driven by success and wealth, causing her to miss significant time with her family. Their marriage continues to deteriorate, and Toby comes to resent Rachel's ambitious lifestyle, as well as her wealthy friends, who treat Toby's job with condescension. At a dinner with Rachel's friends, when asked to name a person she would like to have sex with outside her marriage, she mentions Sam Rothberg, the alpha male of Rachel's friend group's husbands and the wealthy head of a pharmaceutical company whom Toby despises for selling placebos to unsuspecting patients. In the present, Toby remembers this incident and looks up Sam on Facebook, realizing that Rachel's last known location is a short drive from where Sam is.
4	"God, What an Idiot He Was!"	Shari Springer Berman & Robert Pulcini	Taffy Brodesser-Akner	December 1, 2022
Toby storms over to his former apartment and finds evidence that Sam had been there, leaving him feeling emasculated and angry, which increases when Nahid, a regular hookup of his, rejects an offer for a date. He impulsively visits Libby and her family in suburban New Jersey, but feels awkward around her husband, Adam. When Libby learns of Toby's dinner plans with Seth, she insists on joining them, but Toby rebuffs her and leaves. At the restaurant, Seth introduces Toby to his girlfriend, Vanessa, and reveals that he has lost his job due to his boss being investigated for insider trading. Toby realizes, looking around the restaurant, that Rachel was attracted to Sam because of his confident, forwardly wealthy attitude. He receives a call from the hospital and learns that his patient, Karen Cooper, a woman around his age with previously undiagnosed Wilson's disease, has been approved for a liver transplant. He sleeps in the hospital overnight while she has the surgery, having an erotic dream about her. He wakes to see that Karen has recovered and is rejoicing with her husband, prompting him to finally accept that Rachel is seeing someone else.
5	"Vantablack"	Shari Springer Berman & Robert Pulcini	Taffy Brodesser-Akner	December 8, 2022
Two years prior, Libby, a writer for a men's magazine, becomes frustrated that she has not reached the same level of recognition as her male co-workers. In the present, she goes on a vacation to Walt Disney World with her family that increases tensions between her and Adam. Toby has a wild night out with Seth and later buys the dachshund puppy his children have always wanted. He again asks Nahid out on a date, but she explains that she is legally married to her husband, a conservative news anchor and closeted homosexual, who finances her lifestyle under the agreement that she occasionally accompanies him to public events. He is called to pick up Hannah from camp after she sent a suggestive photograph to a male camper, who showed it to his friends but goes unpunished. Revolted, Toby takes Hannah and Solly with him, before telling them about Rachel's choice to abandon them. He considers confronting Rachel when he learns she is in her apartment, but decides not to. He takes the children to the American Museum of Natural History to see a Vantablack exhibit that he visited alone earlier.
6	"This Is My Enjoyment"	Shari Springer Berman & Robert Pulcini	Taffy Brodesser-Akner	December 15, 2022
Toby ends things with Nahid, realizing he needs a more conventional relationship. He gets passed over for a promotion at work due to the many personal days he has been taking. When Karen suffers a post-surgery cerebral hemorrhage that leaves her brain-dead, her husband further upsets Toby by demanding to speak to his boss. Toby attends the annual reunion of his college trip to Israel for the first time in 15 years and enjoys himself. After Adam leaves the party following an argument with Libby, Toby confronts her about how she treats her husband. Libby retorts that Toby only talks about himself, while Seth complains that Toby and Libby both dismiss him for being unmarried and childless. When Toby returns home, Libby tags along and asks to use his bathroom. Libby then laments about how much she misses her past before realizing Toby has fallen asleep; she falls asleep on his bed. The next morning, after Toby angrily asks Libby to leave, she wanders the city and ends up sitting on a park bench across from Rachel.
7	"Me-Time"	Valerie Faris & Jonathan Dayton	Taffy Brodesser-Akner	December 22, 2022
Libby takes a disoriented Rachel back to her apartment, and Rachel explains her situation to Libby. Following the trauma she endured during Hannah's birth, Rachel refused to be a victim and started her own agency, which drove her away from Toby and the children. Shortly after her divorce, Rachel began an affair with Sam. When she announced plans to move to Los Angeles with the children to expand her business, Toby angrily protested. After Rachel dropped the children off at Toby's apartment, Sam took her to a wellness resort in upstate New York, but he abruptly left her alone after growing bored with her, triggering her abandonment issues. Rachel returned home and, unable to sleep, consumed an edible that Sam had given her. She subsequently spent weeks inside her apartment, experiencing drug-induced hallucinations and losing track of time. Eventually leaving her apartment, she fell asleep in Central Park and later discovered that her most important client had dropped her after weeks of no communication. She wandered the city until she encountered Libby. Having heard Rachel's story, Libby puts her to bed and realizes the moral ambiguity of Toby's situation.
8	"The Liver"	Shari Springer Berman & Robert Pulcini	Taffy Brodesser-Akner	December 29, 2022
Libby returns to Toby's apartment to update him, but he coldly dismisses Rachel's nervous breakdown and asks Libby to leave. After taking Karen off life support at her husband's request, however, he begins to regret the way he has treated people recently, and consoles Karen's husband. After finally returning home, Libby attempts to explain to Adam that she has been experiencing an existential crisis due to her dissatisfaction with suburban life, but he berates her for neglecting her family lately. At a party thrown by Seth, he proposes to Vanessa, while Toby and Libby make up with Seth and each other. As Libby discusses her idea for a book based on Toby's divorce, she reflects on the choices she made after she got married and her lost youth; this time, Toby listens and consoles her, and they share an emotional moment. Finally at peace, Libby returns home and joins Adam in their bed, where they reconcile. Shortly after Toby returns to his apartment, Rachel opens the door behind him, exactly how Libby said she would end her book.

== Production ==
=== Development ===
On September 12, 2019, it was announced that ABC Signature had won a 10-studio bidding war for the rights to the novel Fleishman Is in Trouble, with the project being developed for FX. Taffy Brodesser-Akner, the author of the original novel, was attached to write the adaptation as well as executive produce the project alongside Susannah Grant, Carl Beverly, and Sarah Timberman. On March 11, 2021, it was announced that the project was given a limited series order consisting of nine episodes, with the series now set to premiere exclusively on Hulu as part of FX on Hulu. Upon the series order announcement, Brodesser-Akner said:

I'm thrilled to be extending Fleishman's life onto the screen with such smart, thoughtful and courageous partners. When I was writing this book, my aim was to resolve for myself the mystifying dynamics and politics of marriage and middle age. Writing the book didn't help much, so I'm hoping that making this show does the trick.

On August 13, 2021, during FX Networks' Summer 2021 TCA Press Tour panel, it was announced that Little Miss Sunshine filmmaking duo Jonathan Dayton and Valerie Faris were attached to direct multiple episodes of the series.

The limited series was released on November 17, 2022. The first two episodes were available immediately and the rest debuted weekly.

=== Casting ===
Jesse Eisenberg, star of Fleishman Is In Trouble

In November 2021, Lizzy Caplan and Jesse Eisenberg joined the cast of the series in series regular roles, marking their second collaboration together after Now You See Me 2. In January 2022, Claire Danes and Adam Brody joined the cast in series regular roles, while Maxim Jasper Swinton and Meara Mahoney Gross joined the cast in recurring roles. In February 2022, Joy Suprano joined the cast in a recurring role. In March 2022, Michael Gaston, Ralph Adriel Johnson and Brian Miskell joined in recurring roles. In April 2022, Christian Slater and Josh Radnor joined the cast in recurring roles.

=== Filming ===
Principal photography began by February 2022 in New York City.

== Reception ==
=== Critical response ===
On the review aggregator website Rotten Tomatoes, 87% of 54 critics' reviews are positive, with an average rating of 8.2/10. The website's consensus reads: "The characters Fleishman Is in Trouble spends time with aren't the most likable bunch, but the series examines their foibles with compelling insight—and they're brought to life by a terrific trio of stars." Metacritic, which uses a weighted average, assigned the film a score of 79 out of 100, based on 29 critics, indicating "generally favorable" reviews.

Annie Berke of The A.V. Club gave the miniseries an A− and said, "These eight episodes and the characters in them are doing their best, and Fleishman's best is far better than most." Richard Roeper of Chicago Sun-Times gave the miniseries 3 out of 4 stars and wrote, "This is an exceedingly well-cast show, with Eisenberg, Danes, Caplan and Brody all playing to their strengths and hitting notes we've seen them master in previous roles."

According to Ross Douthat, writing for The New York Times, the show highlights the fine class gradations within the modern meritocracy, the psychology of meritocratic ambition, and the crucial, stressful role that marriage plays as a mechanism of social advancement. The show portrays the "privileged angst" faced by those who make hundreds of thousands of dollars annually but face lifestyle inflation and the demands of wealth without its promised security and ease. Similar analysis was presented by Caitlin Moscatello, writing for The Cut.

=== Accolades ===
Year	Award	Category	Nominee	Result	Ref(s)
2023	Critics' Choice Awards	Best Supporting Actress in a Movie/Miniseries	Claire Danes	Nominated	
2023	Golden Globe Awards	Best Supporting Actress – Series Miniseries or Television Film	Claire Danes	Nominated	
2023	USC Scripter Awards	Best Adapted Screenplay – Television	Taffy Brodesser-Akner (for "The Liver")	Nominated	
2023	Writers Guild of America Awards	Limited Series	Taffy Brodesser-Akner, Cindy Chupack, Allison P. Davis, Mike Goldbach, and Boo Killebrew	Nominated	
2023	TCA Awards	Outstanding Achievement in Movies, Miniseries or Specials	Fleishman Is in Trouble	Nominated	
2023	Hollywood Critics Association TV Awards	Best Streaming Limited or Anthology Series	Fleishman Is in Trouble	Nominated	
2023	Hollywood Critics Association TV Awards	Best Supporting Actress in a Streaming Limited or Anthology Series or Movie	Claire Danes	Nominated	
2023	Hollywood Critics Association TV Awards	Best Writing in a Streaming Limited or Anthology Series or Movie	Taffy Brodesser-Akner (for "Me-Time")	Nominated	
2023	Primetime Emmy Awards	Outstanding Limited or Anthology Series	Fleishman Is in Trouble	Nominated	
2023	Primetime Emmy Awards	Outstanding Lead Actress in a Limited or Anthology Series or Movie	Lizzy Caplan	Nominated	
2023	Primetime Emmy Awards	Outstanding Supporting Actress in a Limited or Anthology Series or Movie	Claire Danes	Nominated	
2023	Primetime Emmy Awards	Outstanding Directing for a Limited or Anthology Series or Movie	Valerie Faris and Jonathan Dayton (for "Me-Time")	Nominated	
2023	Primetime Emmy Awards	Outstanding Writing for a Limited or Anthology Series or Movie	Taffy Brodesser-Akner (for "Me-Time")	Nominated	
2023	Primetime Creative Arts Emmy Awards	Outstanding Casting for a Limited or Anthology Series or Movie	Laura Rosenthal and Jodi Angstreich	Nominated	
2023	Primetime Creative Arts Emmy Awards	Outstanding Contemporary Costumes	Leah Katznelson, Angel Peart, Katie Novello, Deidre Wegner, Anne Newton-Harding (for "Me-Time")	Nominated	
2024	Artios Awards	Outstanding Achievement in Casting – Limited Series	Jodi Angstriech, Laura Rosenthal, Tracy Kaczorowski	Nominated	
