= Leaky Roof Gastropub =

Restaurant in Portland, Oregon, U.S.

- Interactive map of Leaky Roof Gastropub

Restaurant information
- Owner: Seamus Blaney
- Food type: British; Irish
- Location: 1538 Southwest Jefferson Street, Portland, Multnomah, Oregon, 97201, United States
- Coordinates: 45.5174°N 122.6903°W

The Leaky Roof Gastropub, or Leaky Roof Gastro Pub, was a restaurant in Portland, Oregon, United States. Established as a food cart in the 1940s, the brick and mortar restaurant has operated in the Goose Hollow neighborhood since 1947. It closed permanently in July 2026.

== Description ==
The Leaky Roof Gastropub (nicknamed "Leaky" or "The Roof") operated in the Goose Hollow neighborhood. The interior had wood floors and the dining room had a wood-burning stove. The gastropub's food menu featured British and Irish cuisine, and included burgers with truffle fries, a chicken Caesar salad, fish and chips with cod, Guinness beef stew, and shepherd's pie, as well as beer, coffee, and wine. Brunch options included Belgian waffles, eggs Benedict, fried chicken, and rosemary-garlic biscuits and gravy, with drinks like bloody marys and Irish coffee. The Leaky Roof also offered happy hour. According to Willamette Week, the restaurant had an "official-looking road sign pointing the way".

== History ==
The business originally operated as a food cart in the 1940s. The brick and mortar restaurant opened in 1947. The space was later remodeled but the original bars and floors were kept. Seamus Blaney was the owner. The restaurant hosted an open mic night.

The restaurant closed permanently in July 2026.

== Reception ==
Alex Frane and Thom Hilton recommended the Leaky Roof in Eater Portland's 2023 overview of restaurants in Goose Hollow. In 2024, Hilton and Maya MacEvoy included the business in an overview of "super-comforting" Irish food in the metropolitan area, and Hilton and Brooke Jackson-Glidden included the Leaky Roof in an overview of restaurants near Providence Park "that are sure to score with" fans of the Portland Timbers. Writers for Eater Portland also included the Leaky Roof in a 2024 list of the "best classic restaurants keeping Old Portland alive".

== See also ==
- Food carts in Portland, Oregon
- List of British restaurants
- List of defunct restaurants of the United States
- List of Irish restaurants
