= Joy Suprano =

American actress

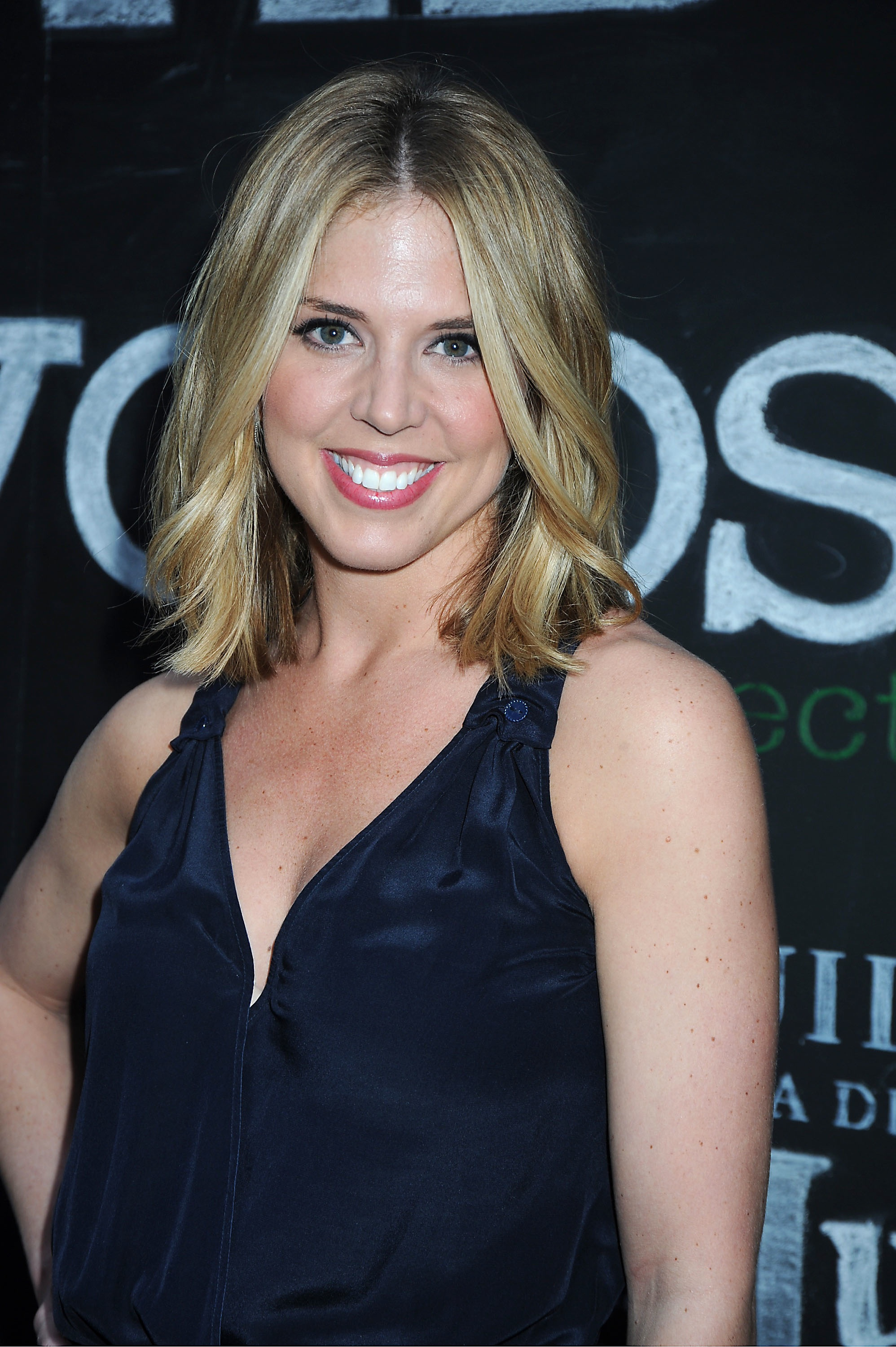
Suprano at The Olevolos Project Fundraiser Brunch.

Joy Suprano is an American actress best known for her lead role in the Apple+ show Best Foot Forward as well as her role in Hulu's Fleishman Is in Trouble.

== Early life and education ==
Suprano was born and raised in Pittsburgh, Pennsylvania and graduated from Burrell High School where she was a competitive athlete and a member of the drama club. She moved to New York City just days after high school graduation to pursue her acting career. She earned a bachelor's degree in acting from the Juilliard School.

== Career ==
Since graduating from Juilliard School Drama Division in NYC and has had numerous film, television, and theater credits. Some of her starring and recurring television roles include "Hightown, "Almost Family," "Ray Donovan," "Law & Order: CI," "How To Make It In America," "Law & Order: SVU," and "Law & Order". Featured films include "Lonely Boy," "A Little Help" starring Jenna Fischer and Chris O'Donnell, and "We Are The Hartmans" opposite Richard Chamberlain. Miss Suprano received rave reviews for her theatrical role of Jan-The-Sly in the NYC premiere of "Yeast Nation, A Triumph Of Life" by the Tony award-winning writing team of "Urintown." She can be seen playing 'Cyndi Leffer' in HULU FX's limited series, "Fleishman Is In Trouble" opposite Claire Danes and Jesse Eisenberg, and is currently starring in the Apple + family comedy, "Best Foot Forward". Suprano appeared in an independent feature film "Magic Hour".

== Filmography ==
=== Film ===
Year	Title	Role	Notes
2010	A Little Help	Julie Cantoni	
2011	We Are the Hartmans	Morgan	
2013	Lonely Boy	Michelle	

=== Television ===
Year	Title	Role	Notes
2009	Law & Order	Portia	Episode: "Pledge"
2009	Law & Order: Special Victims Unit	Rita	Episode: "Hammered"
2010–2011	How to Make It in America	Christen	4 episodes
2011	Law & Order: Criminal Intent	Ilana Garvey	Episode: "The Consoler"
2012	40	Margot	Television film
2015	Royal Pains	Caroline Koch	Episode: "False Start"
2017	The Blacklist	Female MC	Episode: "Isabella Stone (No. 34)"
2018	The Good Cop	Jocelyn	Episode: "Why Kill a Busboy?"
2018	FBI	Eliza Holliman	Episode: "Prey"
2018	Ray Donovan	Jane	Episode: "Pudge"
2019–2020	Almost Family	Grace	2 episodes
2020–2024	Hightown	Patricia / Patty	10 episodes
2022	Best Foot Forward	Maggie Dubin	10 episodes
2022	Fleishman Is in Trouble	Cyndi Leffer	6 episodes
2026	Crystal Lake	Rita	
