= Long Island Compromise =

2024 novel by Taffy Brodesser-Akner

- Author: Taffy Brodesser-Akner
- Publisher: Random House
- Publication date: July 9, 2024
- Pages: 464
- ISBN: 9780593133491

Long Island Compromise is the second novel by journalist and author Taffy Brodesser-Akner, published in 2024 by Random House.

== Plot summary ==
In 1983, Carl Fletcher, the wealthy Jewish owner of a plastic packaging factory in Long Island, is kidnapped and held for a $250,000 ransom. His wife Ruth delivers the ransom and Carl is returned; he had spent the week chained, out of sight, in the factory's basement. Meanwhile, a police investigation turns up two suspects, a former employee of the factory and his brother. The brothers confess to the crime, but most of the $250,000 is never found.

In the present day, Carl and Ruth's three children - Nathan, Bernard (nicknamed Beamer), and Jenny - have each reached middle age and regularly receive shares of the factory's massive profits. Ruth and Carl's mother, Phyllis, have discouraged Carl from discussing the traumatic kidnapping. As a result, Carl is emotionally distant and has left day-to-day factory operations to his loyal foreman Ike Besser. Phyllis' death is the first in a series of unfortunate events that befall the Fletchers over the next few months.

Beamer has become a screenwriter, living in Los Angeles with his wife Noelle and two children. Beamer is a loving father, but unhappy in his marriage with Noelle. While she spends lavishly on beauty procedures and other frivolities, Beamer hides addictions to sex and drugs. Since the success of his first film, an action thriller about a kidnapping, all of Beamer's scripts have been about kidnappings and none have been successful. Beamer's former writing partner challenges him to write something different and meaningful. Searching for a creative spark, Beamer overdoses heavily. He produces a script about a kidnapped young boy, forgets to show up to his daughter's flute recital, and ignores alarmed texts from Jenny and Noelle before finally passing out.

The eldest sibling, Nathan, still lives in Long Island and has become a real estate lawyer wracked by anxiety, low self-confidence, and an addiction to purchasing insurance policies. Nathan's law firm tasks him with concluding the permitting process for a department store chain's newest location. At the last second, a temperamental town council member cancels the permit, and Nathan resorts to bribery. His employers find out and Nathan is placed on unpaid leave. Nathan's wife, Alyssa, comes from a lower-class and conservative Jewish family. While she pours money into preparations for their twin sons' bar mitzvah, Nathan hides both his lack of work and his recent discovery that his savings have been squandered by his investment partner, a former childhood bully. Jenny alerts Nathan that they are no longer receiving payments from the factory. He investigates, and finds that the investment firm that manages the factory has decided to close it down.

Jenny, the youngest sibling, has felt shame and disgust for her family's wealth for her whole life. Although an excellent student, Jenny struggled to settle on a professional career. As a graduate student in economics at Yale, she inadvertently became the leader of the graduate students' union, and devoted herself to the union's work while neglecting relationships with friends and family. At Phyllis' funeral, Jenny is shocked by the warmth expressed by childhood friends in attendance. She spirals into depression and loses her job at the union. Learning of the factory's impending closure jolts her out of self-loathing and she visits the factory, leading to a lunch with Max, Ike Besser's son. Max shares his suspicions that the kidnapping investigation never found the real culprit.

The entire family reunites in the weeks surrounding the bar mitzvah. Carl's sister Marjorie misinterprets Ruth's directions to sell her share of the factory and burns it down instead. Carl hallucinates a conversation in which Zelig Fletcher, Carl's immigrant father, confesses that he stole the original chemical formula for the factory's plastic products. Carl finally comes to terms with the kidnapping and his own actions and passes away peacefully in the arms of Ike, revealed by the narrator to have been the true kidnapper. Zelig's experiences fleeing the Holocaust made him shrewd and paranoid, and Ruth learns that he had buried diamonds on the Fletcher property as insurance against future calamities. As the diamonds allow each of the Fletchers to regain their riches, the narrator reflects that the emotional damage the wealth brings them will also be retained and passed down.

== Reception ==
The novel appeared on 11 lists of the best books of the year.

In a starred review, Kirkus Reviews called the book "a great American Jewish novel whose brew of hilarity, heartbreak, and smarts recalls the best of Philip Roth. A triumph." Writing in The New York Times Book Review, Sloane Crosley similarly praised the novel, saying "Given the unavoidable success of her debut, 'Fleishman Is in Trouble,' I will spare curious readers the suspense and answer a more cynical question: Is this book as good? It’s better. Sprawling yet nimble, this is her Big American Reform Jewish Novel...All those well-timed twists, neat callbacks and tidy scenes are a mitzvah for this satisfying, touching novel."

Adelle Waldman of The Atlantic called the novel's plot "ingenious" and applauded "its various storylines building toward several extremely satisfying plot twists—by which I mean the best kind of twists, ones that are earned, that make the reader simultaneously gasp in surprise and want to hit oneself because, in retrospect, they make so much sense that there’s no excuse for not having seen them coming."

== Adaptation ==
Apple TV+ acquired the novel's television rights.

== See also ==
- Kidnapping of Jack Teich

== Bibliography ==
- Adler, Luna (July 3, 2024). "In 'Long Island Compromise,' Taffy Brodesser-Akner Considers the 'Pernicious' Nature of Trauma". Vogue.
- Alpern, Emma (July 2, 2024). "Taffy Brodesser-Akner Overcooks It". Vulture.
- Atkins, Lucy (July 12, 2024). "Long Island Compromise by Taffy Brodesser-Akner review – trials of the wealthy". The Guardian. ISSN 0261-3077.
- Brodesser-Akner, Taffy (July 7, 2024). "The Kidnapping I Can't Escape". The New York Times. ISSN 0362-4331.
- Charles, Ron (July 9, 2024). "'Long Island Compromise' by Taffy Brodesser-Akner book review". The Washington Post.
- Crosley, Sloane (July 7, 2024). "When a Father Gets Kidnapped, His Family Pays the Price". The New York Times. ISSN 0362-4331.
- Fox, Mira (July 8, 2024). "Must Jews be defined by trauma? Taffy Brodesser-Akner's sharp new novel offers a surprising answer". The Forward.
- Haber, Leigh (July 6, 2024). "'Long Island Compromise' joins the pantheon of great American novels". Los Angeles Times.
- Miller, Laura (July 10, 2024). "The Styrofoam Titans". Slate. ISSN 1091-2339.
- Mosley, Tonya (July 8, 2024). "Taffy Brodesser-Akner explores wealth and family trauma in 'Long Island Compromise'". NPR.
- Rosseinsky, Katie (July 13, 2024). "Are authors now writing for TV producers rather than readers?". The Independent.
- Sacks, Sam (July 5, 2024). "Fiction: Taffy Brodesser-Akner's 'Long Island Compromise'". WSJ.
- Salikof, Ken (May 17, 2024). "Heading Toward Disaster: PW Talks with Taffy Brodesser-Akner". PublishersWeekly.com.
- Self, John (June 30, 2024). "Long Island Compromise by Taffy Brodesser-Akner review – an old-fashioned maximalist rush of storytelling". The Observer. ISSN 0029-7712.
- Wagner, Erica (July 4, 2024). "Long Island Compromise — rich, stylish, moving and funny". Financial Times.
- Waldman, Adelle (July 9, 2024). "The Particular Ways That Being Rich Screws You Up". The Atlantic.
- Wilson, Jennifer (July 1, 2024). "Taffy Brodesser-Akner's Scabrous Satire of the Super-Rich". The New Yorker. ISSN 0028-792X.
- Winik, Marion (July 14, 2024). "Taffy Brodesser-Akner talks about 'Long Island Compromise'". Newsday.
