= Fleishman Is in Trouble =

2019 novel by Taffy Brodesser-Akner

- First edition cover
- Author: Taffy Brodesser-Akner
- Language: English
- Published: June 18, 2019
- Publisher: Random House
- Publication place: United States
- Media type: Print (hardcover and paperback); Audiobook; E-book
- Pages: 384
- ISBN: 978-0-5255-1087-1

Fleishman Is in Trouble is a 2019 novel by American author Taffy Brodesser-Akner. The debut novel was published on June 18, 2019, by Random House. It tells the story of a Manhattan couple undergoing a bitter divorce. Brodesser-Akner also wrote the screenplay for a television miniseries based on the novel, which was released on Hulu in 2022.

== Writing ==
Brodesser-Akner was working as a staff writer at The New York Times during the writing of the novel. Its narrative style mirrors that of her celebrity profiles, by having the titular character's troubles presented through the eyes and ears of an intermediary, who has been seen as a stand-in for the author herself. She has stated that having the male as the center of the plot was a conscious decision so as to look at male sexuality from an outside perspective. The book has drawn comparisons to Philip Roth and John Updike, albeit from a feminist perspective. Brodesser-Akner has acknowledged the influence of those authors on her writing.

== Plot ==
Toby, a 41-year-old hepatologist, is undergoing a bitter divorce from his wife Rachel, a successful talent agent in New York. One day, she drops off their children, 11-year-old Hannah and 9-year-old Solly, at Toby's house while he is still sleeping and takes off. She does not respond to texts or calls from him for the following weeks. The story, narrated by Toby's college friend Libby (a former writer for a men's magazine), follows their lives over this period and the events that led to the breakdown of their 14-year-marriage, as well as reflections of Libby's own life.

== Themes ==
Fleishman Is in Trouble deals with the themes of gender roles, marriage and divorce, online dating, midlife crises, and class anxiety. The novel mocks the affluent Manhattan professional class and its pretensions while embracing their anxieties, especially those relating to marriage and gender. An underlying theme of the book is the relegation of women to the background in a male-centric society. At one point in the book, the narrator says that "the only way to get someone to listen to a woman [is] to tell her story through a man", which is what the book in itself does. The novel also deals with the nature of marriage and relationships, in particular the strain that arises in marriages in which the wife is the primary breadwinner. It has been seen as a larger commentary on marriage in modern America and the way in which it appears to strip people of their identities and force them into routines. Brodesser-Akner also parodies the app-based dating culture, from grammatically poor sexts to the names of dating apps (such as Hr, Choose, Forage and Reach). In particular, the novel focuses on the generation that got married before the advent of dating apps and who, upon divorcing, had to adjust to new dating practices.

== Television series ==
In March 2021, FX ordered a limited series of the novel. Brodesser-Akner adapted her novel for the small screen. It premiered on Hulu on November 22, 2022, starring Jesse Eisenberg as the title character, Claire Danes as his ex-wife, and Lizzy Caplan and Adam Brody as Fleishman's best friends.

== Reception ==
The Guardian called it "an honest, powerful, human story with no apologies", while Rolling Stone praised its "unsparing yet sympathetic depiction of the way we live now". Writing for The Washington Post, Ron Charles opined that the novel "slices through the demeaning rules of the patriarchy just as effectively as she slays the fatuous optimism of that 'girl-power' propaganda fed to modern girls".

The BBC praised its "enjoyable satirical touch", but found it "laborious to read and ultimately not very interesting". The Harvard Crimson panned its writing as "lazy" and further said that the book "rarely [shows] more than the various characters' selfish desires to run away from the lives they've willingly signed up for". Similarly, Kay Hymowitz also criticized the characterization in the book, commenting: "What's telling about our current cultural moment is that Rachel's shallow, snobbish status obsessions didn't attract any attention from the book's many reviewers; it's as if those obsessions are so obviously acceptable that they don't notice their corrupting effect. Instead, they endorsed the novel's supposed depiction of 'the impossible pressures that talented women endure'."

== Honors and awards ==
The novel was selected for the longlist for the Women's Prize for Fiction 2020.
