= Taffy Brodesser-Akner =

American journalist and author

- Born: Stephanie Akner; 1975 or 1976 (age 50–51); New York City, New York, U.S.
- Education: New York University
- Occupation: Journalist
- Spouse: Claude Brodesser-Akner (m. 2006)
- Children: 2
- Website: taffyakner.com

Taffy Brodesser-Akner (born Stephanie Akner) is an American journalist and author. She has worked freelance and as a contributor to GQ and The New York Times, where she is now a staff writer. Her profiles of celebrities have won her the New York Press Club Award and Mirror Award. She is the author of novels Long Island Compromise and Fleishman Is in Trouble. The latter was made into a seven-time Emmy-nominated miniseries, which she also wrote.

== Career ==
=== Journalism ===
Brodesser-Akner's first major journalism job was at Soap Opera Weekly, a job she held until it was eliminated due to layoffs in 2001. She also wrote for Mediabistro and did freelance pieces for magazines including ESPN The Magazine, GQ, and Texas Monthly. The Columbia Journalism Review called her "one of the nation's most successful freelance writers." Many of her freelance articles were celebrity profiles, several of which went viral. In 2014, she became a contributing writer to both The New York Times and GQ, and won a New York Press Club award for entertainment news in a magazine for her story about actress Gaby Hoffmann. She won two New York Press Club awards in 2015, for her profiles of Damon Lindelof and Britney Spears. The same year, Brodesser-Akner was nominated for a Mirror Award for her profile of Joey Soloway, and in 2016 she won the award for her profile of broadcaster Don Lemon. In 2017, she became a full-time staff writer at The New York Times.

=== Fiction and television ===
Her first novel, Fleishman Is in Trouble, was published in 2019 by Random House in the US and by Wildfire in the UK. The novel was longlisted for the Women's Prize for Fiction 2020. Brodesser-Akner adapted the novel as a TV miniseries, which debuted on Hulu on November 17, 2022. In 2023, she was nominated for a Primetime Emmy Award for Outstanding Writing for a Limited or Anthology Series or Movie. Her second novel, Long Island Compromise, was published in 2024 by Random House in the US and by Wildfire in the UK.

== Personal life ==
Born Stephanie Akner, Brodesser-Akner received the nickname "Taffy" at a young age and continued using it professionally. She grew up in Brooklyn, New York, in an Orthodox Jewish household. She attended New York University.

She married Claude Brodesser in 2006. Brodesser converted to Judaism, a process that eventually led Akner to evaluate and reinforce her own observance of Jewish customs. After marrying, both took hyphenated last names. They have two children. She wrote that as a grandchild of Holocaust survivors, she was particularly alarmed when her son was called an antisemitic slur on the basketball court in Riverside Park, and her other son had a caricature done in Times Square that evoked antisemitic tropes.

== Bibliography ==
- Fleishman is in Trouble (2019, Random House)
- Long Island Compromise (2024, Random House)
