= Phil LaMarr =

American actor (born 1967)

- LaMarr in 2026
- Born: 1967 (age 58–59); Los Angeles, California, U.S.
- Occupations: Actor; comedian; television writer; impressionist
- Years active: 1983–present
- Children: 2
- Website: phillamarr.com

Phil LaMarr (born 1967) is an American actor and comedian. He was one of the original featured cast members on the sketch comedy television series Mad TV, where he stayed for five seasons. His voice acting roles in animated series include the title character of Samurai Jack, both John Stewart/Green Lantern and Virgil Hawkins/Static in the DC Animated Universe (across the series Static Shock, Justice League, and Justice League Unlimited), Hermes Conrad in Futurama, Bolbi Stroganofsky in The Adventures of Jimmy Neutron: Boy Genius, Carver Descartes in The Weekenders, Ollie Williams and Judge Dignified Q. Blackman in Family Guy, and Wilt in Foster's Home for Imaginary Friends. LaMarr has also provided voices for video game franchises including Metal Gear, Jak and Daxter, Darksiders, Final Fantasy, Infamous, Dead Island, Kingdom Hearts, and Mortal Kombat. He also voiced Browntooth the Goblin Rogue in the Critical Role episode "The Goblins".

In film, he has appeared in Pulp Fiction (1994), Bio-Dome (1996), Speaking of Sex (2001), Spider-Man 2 (2004), and Real Steel (2011).

== Early life and career ==
LaMarr was born in Los Angeles, California. He decided to become an actor when he was in middle school performing in a play. When he was in high school, LaMarr landed a summer job on the animated series Mister T. He attended Yale University where he majored in English. LaMarr became a comedy writer. He decided to become a voice actor after joining MadTV.

== Career ==
=== Mad TV ===
LaMarr, unlike most of the other original nine cast members of Mad TV, had extensive television and film jobs experience when he joined the show. Even before college, he had voiced a character on the Mister T cartoon show.

Some of the recurring characters LaMarr performed on Mad TV were Desperation Lee ("Funky Walker Dirty Talker"), Jaq the UBS Guy, "sexy player" Rick, talentless R&B singer Savante, and Rocket Revengers star Lieutenant Abraham Jefferson (a.k.a. Lincoln Willis).

LaMarr has done impressions of the following celebrities:

- Bobby Brown
- Ray Charles
- Johnnie Cochran
- Nat King Cole
- Billy Crystal (as Harry Burns from When Harry Met Sally...)
- Diddy
- Tommy Davidson
- Sammy Davis Jr.
- Louis Farrakhan
- Morgan Freeman
- Sherman Hemsley (as George Jefferson from The Jeffersons)
- Ice-T
- Michael Jackson
- Rick James
- Vernon Jordan
- Don King
- LeBron James
- Will Smith
- Martin Lawrence
- Spike Lee
- Bill Maher
- Barack Obama
- Howard McNear (as Floyd Lawson from The Andy Griffith Show)
- Eddie Murphy
- Sidney Poitier
- Tiger Woods
- Colin Powell
- RuPaul
- Prince
- Chris Rock
- Bernard Shaw
- Sinbad
- Sammy Sosa
- Chris Tucker
- Ben Vereen
- Kanye West
- Dwayne Johnson
- Kevin Hart
- Barry White
- Michael Winslow
- Stevie Wonder

He has also done impressions of Moe Howard from The Three Stooges while playing an African-American version of the character.

LaMarr left Mad TV at the end of the fifth season (2000).

=== Voice acting work ===
LaMarr's voice over credits include a starring role on Justice League and Justice League Unlimited as John Stewart/Green Lantern, a major role as Hermes Conrad and various other characters on Futurama, and the title roles on Samurai Jack and Static Shock. He also voiced Black Vulcan in Harvey Birdman, Attorney at Law and Hector Con Carne in Evil Con Carne. LaMarr reprised his role as Hermes Conrad in the Futurama films Bender's Big Score, The Beast with a Billion Backs, Bender's Game, Into the Wild Green Yonder, and upon the series return in 2010. He also voices Wilt and other recurring characters in Foster's Home for Imaginary Friends, Carver Descartes on The Weekenders, Philly Phil in Class of 3000, and he portrayed the character Osmosis Jones in the television series Ozzy & Drix (replacing Chris Rock). He was also Gabe Wallace, and other characters in Kaijudo: Rise of the Duel Masters. He additionally voices Jazz, Omega Supreme, Oil Slick, and Jetstorm on Transformers Animated. LaMarr portrayed Nautolan Jedi Master Kit Fisto in Star Wars: The Clone Wars on Cartoon Network; he also played Amit Noloff, a one time character, and a Tactical Droid. He voiced Aquaman and other characters in Young Justice, and Baxter Stockman in the 2012 Teenage Mutant Ninja Turtles. He also lent his voice to the character of Lucius Fox for DC Super Hero Girls. LaMarr also provided voice talent to J.A.R.V.I.S. throughout the series of The Avengers: Earth's Mightiest Heroes. He also portrayed Professor Thistlethorpe, a caterpillar, in BoJack Horseman. Through a tweet, Jar Jar Binks actor Ahmed Best implied that LaMarr had done the voice work for his character on the animated show The Clone Wars under the pseudonym BJ Hughes. LaMarr provided the voice of Alphabittle the unicorn in the Netflix animated film My Little Pony: A New Generation.

In July 2021, LaMarr provided the voice for Orn Free Taa in Star Wars: The Bad Batch.

=== Film and theatre projects ===
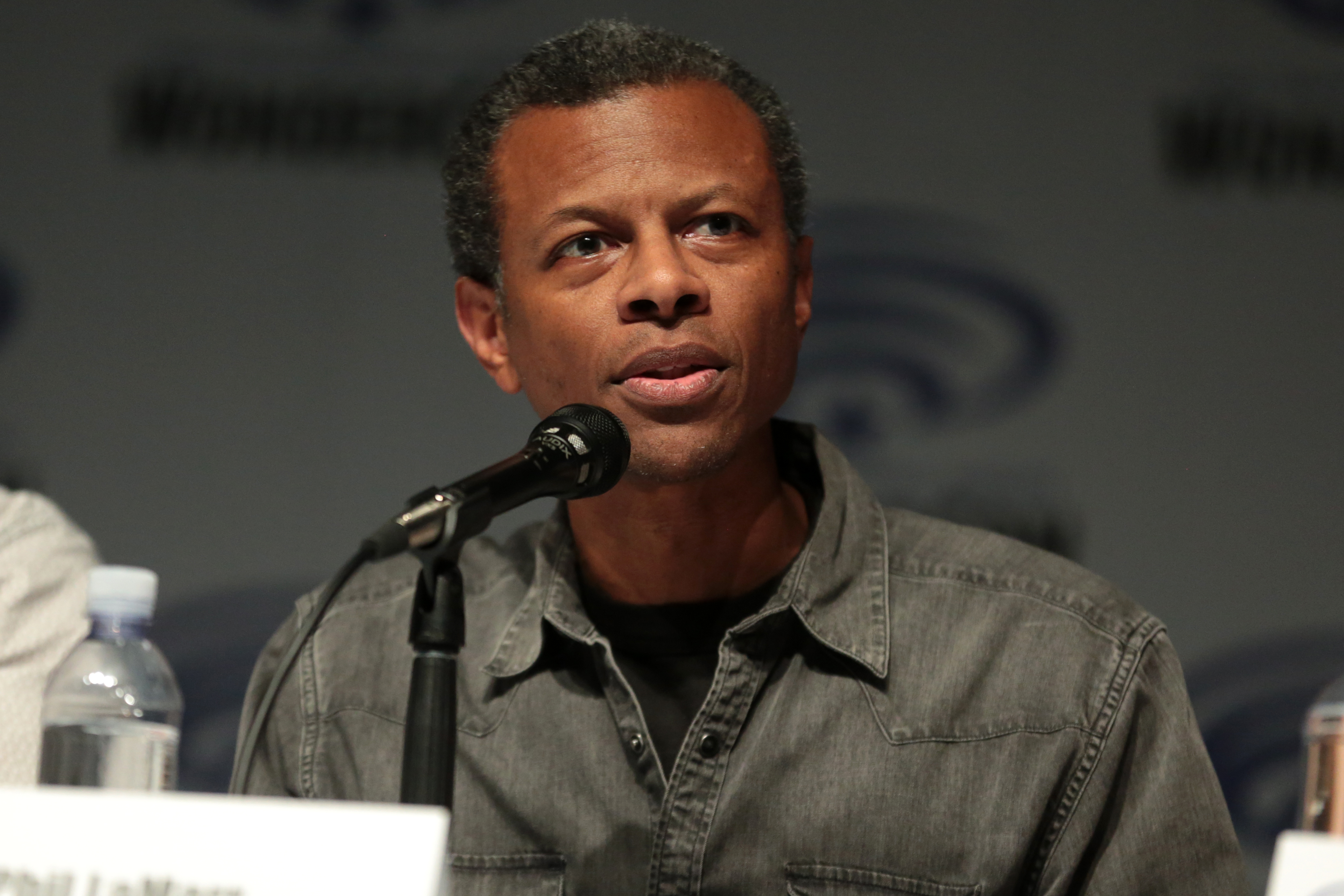
LaMarr at the 2017 WonderCon in Anaheim, California

LaMarr's stage credits include The Tempest, As You Like It, Guys and Dolls, Asylum, South Coast Repertory's Make the Break and the Sacred Fools Theater Company's inaugural production of The Fatty Arbuckle Spookhouse Revue.

LaMarr's second film role was that of the ill-fated Marvin from Pulp Fiction. He has appeared in Kill the Man, Free Enterprise, Cherish, and Manna from Heaven. He appeared in Speaking of Sex starring Bill Murray and Catherine O'Hara, and Back by Midnight with Kirstie Alley, Rodney Dangerfield, and Randy Quaid.

LaMarr's other film appearances include Fronterz (2004) and Choose Your Own Adventure: The Abominable Snowman (2005). LaMarr also appeared in Cook Off! as Thaddeus Briggs.

LaMarr made a cameo appearance in the Will Ferrell film Step Brothers, viewing a house for sale with his wife.

LaMarr also was in the Yum Corp Sexual Harassment training videos.

LaMarr played Cowboy Curtis (originally portrayed by Laurence Fishburne) in the Los Angeles and Broadway productions of The Pee-wee Herman Show. The LA production ran from January 12 to February 7, 2010, at the Club Nokia @ LA Live. The New York show opened on November 11 and ended its limited engagement on January 2, 2011. The New York production was recorded for an HBO special that aired in March 2011.

LaMarr also appeared in Spider-Man 2 as a passenger standing behind Spider-Man in the subway train.

=== Video game voice-over work ===
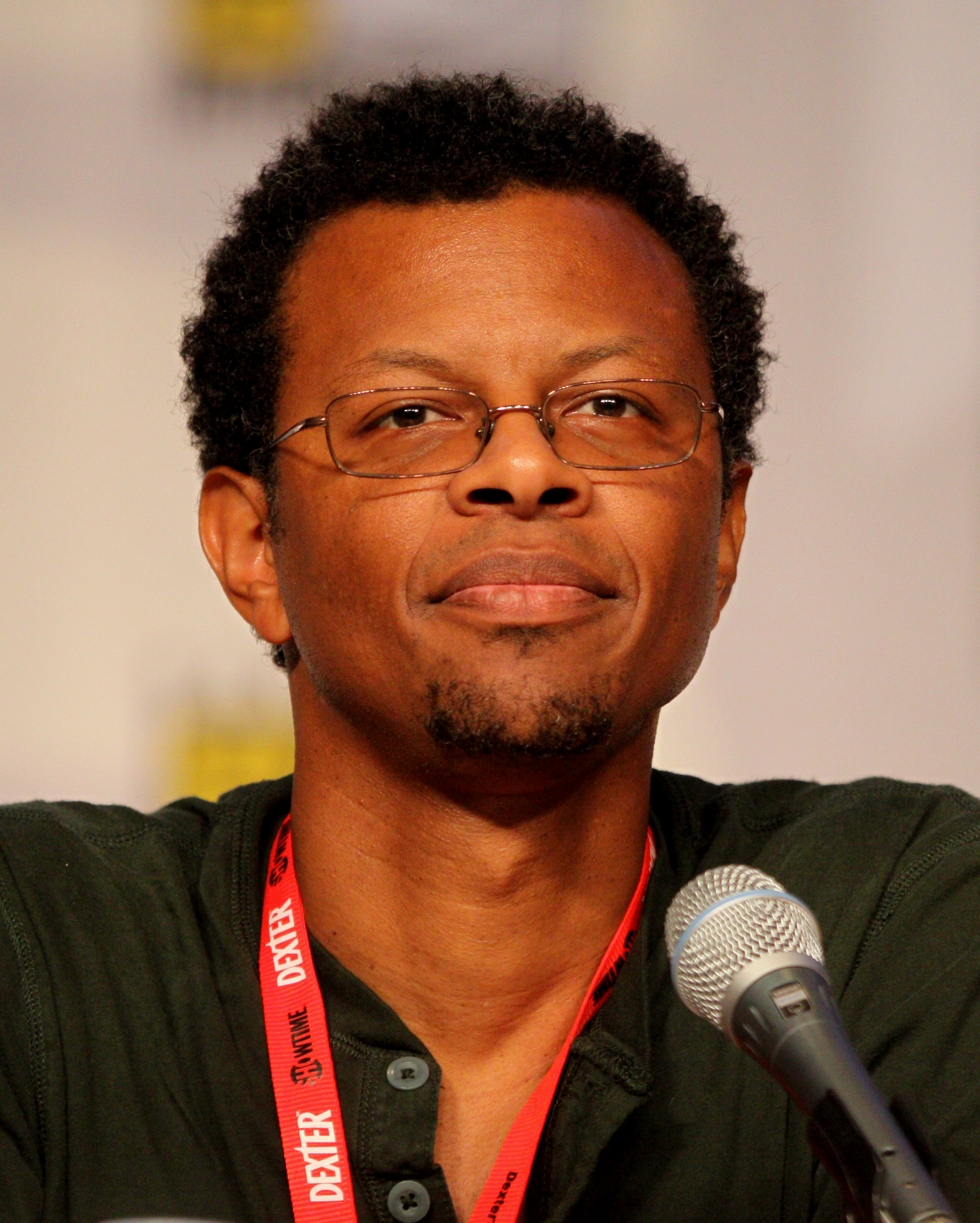
LaMarr at the 2010 San Diego Comic-Con promoting Futurama

LaMarr performed the English voice-over work for Vamp, a villain of Metal Gear Solid 2: Sons of Liberty and Metal Gear Solid 4: Guns of the Patriots. Additionally, LaMarr voiced the characters Reddas from Square Enix's Final Fantasy XII as well as Ramza in the PSP version of Final Fantasy Tactics: The War of the Lions. He also did several voices for Vampire: The Masquerade – Bloodlines.

He also did the English voice acting for the parts of Sig and Count Veger in the Jak and Daxter video game series as well as voicing several characters in the game Marvel: Ultimate Alliance, as well as the voice of Gadon Thek in Star Wars: Knights of the Old Republic. As well as a featuring in the Sega CD game Make My Video C+C Music Factory, he also was the voice of Chris Jacobs in both Mercenaries: Playground of Destruction and its sequel, Mercenaries 2: World in Flames. He plays the character John White/The Beast in the PS3 titles Infamous and Infamous 2. Also, he plays the character Dr. Bradley Ragland in the game Prototype.

He also was the voice of the grumpy Kane in the game The Legend of Spyro: A New Beginning, and Marty in the video game tie-in of Madagascar. LaMarr also voiced the merchant "Vulgrim" in the action/adventure hybrid Darksiders.

He played the role of "Mr. Sunshine" in the 2008 crime game Saints Row 2, and reprised his role in Saints Row IV in 2013.

He reprised his role as Kit Fisto for the video game: Star Wars: The Clone Wars – Republic Heroes. LaMarr voiced Rick Grimes and various other characters in the motion comic adaptation of The Walking Dead.

He also voiced Sam B, one of the playable characters in Dead Island, and appeared in Kingdom Hearts 3D: Dream Drop Distance as Phoebus, a character originally from The Hunchback of Notre Dame and voiced by Kevin Kline.

LaMarr returned to the Metal Gear franchise as the voice of Kevin Washington in Metal Gear Rising: Revengeance.

He also provided the voice for multiple roles in Hunt the Truth, a marketing campaign audio-drama for Halo 5: Guardians.

LaMarr provided the voices of Aquaman and John Stewart (Green Lantern) in the 2013 superhero fighting video game Injustice: Gods Among Us and its 2017 sequel, Injustice 2.

LaMarr, in addition, provided his voice for a number of audio logs in 2016 puzzle game, The Witness. He also voiced Kotal Kahn in Mortal Kombat X (2015) and Mortal Kombat 11 (2019).

He voiced Pangolier in Dota 2.

=== Webisode project ===
LaMarr had been announced to appear as a regular character in a webisode series, Naught for Hire produced by Jeffrey Berman and Ben Browder (Farscape), that has been in development since 2010. His character Mark One was described to be that of an elevator with mood swings.

=== Kickstarter ===
LaMarr worked on co-creating and voice-acting in a project titled Goblins Animated. The Kickstarter launched on October 23, 2017, and finished on November 22, 2017. LaMarr worked with Ellipsis Stephens, Danielle Stephens, and Matt King to produce the series. Voice actors on board were Billy West, Maurice LaMarche, Jim Cummings, Matthew Mercer, and Steve Blum.

== Filmography ==
=== Live-action ===
==== Film ====
List of live-action acting performances in films
Year	Title	Role	Notes	Source
1994	It's Pat	Stage Manager		
1994	Pulp Fiction	Marvin		
1996	Bio-Dome	Assistant		
1998	Suicide, the Comedy	Erik		
1998	The Thin Pink Line	Jimmy "Licorice Whip" Wilson		
1998	Free Enterprise	Eric		
1999	Kill the Man	Marky Marx		
1999	Eat Your Heart Out	Stage Manager		
2000	A Man Is Mostly Water	Testifier		
2001	Speaking of Sex	Joel Johnson Jr.		
2002	Jane White Is Sick & Twisted	Bert		
2002	Cherish	Yoga Instructor		
2002	Manna from Heaven	Asst. Casino Manager		
2003	Evil Alien Conquerors	Vel-Dan		
2004	Spider-Man 2	Train Passenger	Uncredited	
2005	Back by Midnight	Mile Away		
2008	Step Brothers	Second Homebuyer		
2008	Quid Pro Quo	Wannabe Group Leader		
2011	Real Steel	ESPN Boxing Commentator		
2013	I Know That Voice	Himself	Documentary	
2014	Men, Women & Children	Shrink		

==== Television ====
List of live-action acting performances in television
Year	Title	Role	Notes	Source
1991	Murphy Brown	Ben Lawson	Episode: "Q & A on FYI"	
1991	The Royal Family	Mr. Spencer	Episode: "Educating Al"	
1992	Jake and the Fatman	Assistant	Episode: "There'll Be Some Changes Made"	
1993	The Fresh Prince of Bel-Air	Edward	Episode: "Robbing the Banks"	
1993	L.A. Law	Reporter #3	Episode: "Parent Trap"	
1993	Wings	Gil the Mechanic	Episode: "Labor Pains"	
1993	Mad About You	Marshall	Episode: "The Man Who Said Hello"	
1993	Sex, Shock & Censorship	Butch Jones	Television film	
1993	The Second Half	Concierge	Episode: "Like Father, Like John"	
1994	Hangin' with Mr. Cooper	Leonard Pickett	Episode: "For Whom the Heck the Bell Tolls"	
1994	The George Carlin Show	Bob Brown	7 episodes	
1995	Get Smart	The Jazz Singer	Episode: "Shoot Up the Charts"	
1995	Living Single	Joe	Episode: "If the Crew Fits"	
1995	Sawbones	Stanley Johnson	Television film	
1995–2000	Mad TV	Various	112 episodes Also writer (55 episodes)	
2000–2001	Yes, Dear	Steve	2 episodes	
2000–2001	Nikki	Richard	2 episodes	
2001	NYPD Blue	Sidney Thompson	2 episodes	
2001	Philly	Anthony	2 episodes	
2003	Without a Trace	Tom Lewis Jr.	Episode: "Kam Li"	
2003	A.U.S.A.	Announcer	Episode: "Sullivan, Rakoff, & Associate"	
2004–2005	Eve	Coleman	3 episodes	
2004	The Bernie Mac Show	Orlando	Episode: "That Old Mac Magic"	
2004	Reno 911!	Craps Guy	2 episodes	
2004	Cold Case	Kiki Solis	Episode: "Discretion"	
2005	Second Time Around	Myron	Episode: "You're Fired"	
2005	Barbershop	Derrick	4 episodes	
2006	The Jake Effect	Marcus	Episode: "Don't Mess with Sloppy"	
2007	Curb Your Enthusiasm	Pharmacist	Episode: "The N Word"	
2007	According to Jim	Kurt	Episode: "Any Man of Mine"	
2009–2014	Castle	Dr. Holloway	3 episodes	
2010	Svetlana	Phil	3 episodes	
2010–2011	Big Time Rush	Hawk	3 episodes	
2011	State of Georgia	Jules	2 episodes	
2012	Happy Endings	Phil	Episode: "Makin' Changes"	
2012–2013	Inside the Legend	Chaz Hannigan, Einsteintwain, Oedipus, Saint Peter, John Henry	Also writer and producer	
2013	Raising Hope	Nolan	Episode: "Credit Where Credit Is Due"	
2013	Comedy Bang! Bang!	Ricky Nichols	Episode: "Cobie Smulders Wears a Black & White Strapless Dress"	
2015	The Millers	Principal Walters	Episode: "Hero"	
2015	Young & Hungry	Father Gary	Episode: "Young & Christmas"	
2016	The Muppets	Doctor	Episode: "Generally Inhospitable"	
2016	The Real O'Neals	Archie	Episode: "The Real Spring Fever"	
2016	Lucifer	Ryan Goldburg	Episode: "Weaponizer"	
2016–2017	Veep	Paul Graves	4 episodes	
2017	Grey's Anatomy	Steve Duncan	Episode: "Jukebox Hero"	
2017	Get Shorty	Brandon Fisher	5 episodes	
2018	Superstore	Erick Evans	Episode: "Video Game Release"	
2018	Heathers	Mr. McNamara	2 episodes	
2019	Supergirl	Malefic J'onzz	Recurring role	
2019–2023	A Black Lady Sketch Show	Various	7 episodes	
2022	The Woman in the House Across the Street from the Girl in the Window	Group Counseling Leader	Episode: "Episode 3"	
2022	Murderville	Commissioner Barton	Episode: "The Cold Case"	
2022	Better Things	LaMarr	Episode: "Ephemera"	

=== Voice roles ===
==== Film ====
List of voice performances in direct-to-video, feature and television films
Year	Title	Role	Notes	Source
1994	Richard Scarry's Best Silly Stories and Songs Video Ever	Sergeant Murphy, Bananas Gorilla	Short film Uncredited	
1998	One Hand, Left	Narrator	Short film	
1998	Zoomates	Warren, Solicitor, Guy #1	Short film	
2000	Gen^{13}	Alex Fairchild		
2002	The Powerpuff Girls Movie	I.P. Host, Local Anchor		
2003	Scooby-Doo! and the Legend of the Vampire	Daniel Illiwara, King		
2003	Creepy Freaks	Assorted Freaks		
2003	The Animatrix	Duo	Segment: "Program"	
2004	Scooby-Doo! and the Loch Ness Monster	Angus Haggart, Volunteer #2		
2004	Shark Tale	Pawn Shop Owner		
2004	Kangaroo Jack: G'Day U.S.A.!	Rico, Mikey		
2005	Stewie Griffin: The Untold Story	Ollie Williams, additional voices		
2005	The Proud Family Movie	Dr. Carver in Disguise, Board Member		
2006	Hellboy: Sword of Storms	Bureau Member, Pilot, additional voices		
2006	The Adventures of Brer Rabbit	Brer Gator		
2006	Choose Your Own Adventure: The Abominable Snowman	Pasang		
2006	Tekkonkinkreet	Dusk	English dub	
2007	TMNT	Various		
2007	Futurama: Bender's Big Score	Hermes Conrad, additional voices		
2007	Billy & Mandy's Big Boogey Adventure	Dracula, Judge Roy Spleen, Underworld Cop, Evil Glacier		
2008	Dragonlance: Dragons of Autumn Twilight	Riverwind, Gilthanas, Sun Speaker		
2008	Futurama: The Beast with a Billion Backs	Hermes Conrad, additional voices		
2008	Madagascar: Escape 2 Africa	Guide		
2008	Foster's Home for Imaginary Friends: Destination: Imagination	Wilt, Jackie Khones, Hero, Dad		
2009	Afro Samurai: Resurrection	Teen Afro Samurai	English dub	
2009	Futurama: Into the Wild Green Yonder	Hermes Conrad, additional voices		
2009	Battle for Terra	Fabric Merchant		
2009	Curious George 2: Follow That Monkey!	Animal Park Attendant		
2010	Batman: Under the Red Hood	Rick		
2010	Cats & Dogs: The Revenge of Kitty Galore	Cat Spy Analyst #1, Paws		
2010	Tom and Jerry Meet Sherlock Holmes	Spike, Policeman		
2010	Scooby-Doo! Camp Scare	Darryl		
2011	Hoodwinked Too! Hood vs. Evil	Ernesto, Wood		
2012	Zambezia	Announcer Bird		
2012	Beverly Hills Chihuahua 3: Viva la Fiesta!	Diego, Black Labbeth Bassist		
2012	Tom and Jerry: Robin Hood and His Merry Mouse	Spike		
2013	Madly Madagascar	Tour Guide		
2013	Tom and Jerry's Giant Adventure	Spike, Policeman		
2013	Scooby-Doo! Mecha Mutt Menace	Stan, Mission Control		
2013	Khumba	Elder #2		
2015	Batman Unlimited: Animal Instincts	Kirk Langstrom / Man-Bat		
2015	Curious George 3: Back to the Jungle	Plane Mechanic, Dam Operator		
2016	Lego DC Comics Super Heroes: Justice League – Cosmic Clash	Brainiac		
2016	Batman Unlimited: Mechs vs. Mutants	Dr. Kirk Langstrom		
2017	DC Super Hero Girls: Intergalactic Games	Will Magnus		
2017	CarGo	Fred Cop Car, Speedy Fireball		
2017	The Emoji Movie	Additional voices		
2017	Deep	Artie		
2018	Incredibles 2	Krushauer, Helectrix, additional voices		
2018	In This Gray Place	Lt. Arnold Koch		
2018	Lego DC Comics Super Heroes: The Flash	Firestorm		
2019	The Lion King	Topi (Note: This animal was miscredited as "Impala".)		
2020	Superman: Red Son	John Stewart / Green Lantern, Ron Troupe		
2021	Arlo the Alligator Boy	Willow Button Guy, Gill, Barn Folk, Rich Man		
2021	My Little Pony: A New Generation	Alphabittle		
2021	Rumble	Security Guard		
2022	The Bob's Burgers Movie	Additional voices		
2022	Beavis and Butt-Head Do the Universe	Various voices		
2023	The Magician's Elephant	Various voices		
2023	The Super Mario Bros. Movie	Additional voices		
2023	Babylon 5: The Road Home	Dr. Stephen Franklin		
2023	Mortal Kombat Legends: Cage Match	Brian Van Jones		
2023	Quiz Lady	The Brain		
2023	Craig Before the Creek	Bernard Williams, Teach, Waterballoon Mike		
2024	Watchmen Chapter 1	Comic Book Narrator, Bernie, Security Guard		
2024	Watchmen Chapter 2	Comic Book Narrator, Bernie, Male Citizen #1		
2026	Minions & Monsters	Howard		

==== Television ====
List of voice performances in animation
Year	Title	Role	Notes	Source
1983–1985	Mister T	Woody Daniels		
1997	Happily Ever After: Fairy Tales for Every Child	Various voices		
1997	Johnny Bravo	Various voices		
1998	The Wild Thornberrys	Tuku, Steamboat Captain	2 episodes	
1998	Oh Yeah! Cartoons	Warren, Solicitor	Episode: "Zoomates"	
1998–2009; 2026–present	King of the Hill	Roger "Booba" Sack, Lester Payton, Ramsey	21 episodes	
1999–2001	The PJs	Thurgood Stubbs	Eddie Murphy's understudy	
1999–2003	Hey Arnold!	Jamie O. Johanssen		
1999–present	Family Guy	Ollie Williams, Judge Dignified Q. Blackman, additional voices		
1999–present	Futurama	Hermes Conrad, additional voices		
2000–2004	The Weekenders	Carver Descartes, Bluke, Coach Coulson, various voices		
2000–2004	Static Shock	Virgil Hawkins / Static, John Stewart / Green Lantern, Tracy McGrady	Main role (52 episodes)	
2000–2002	What a Cartoon!	Lost Cat, Captain Americlean	2 episodes	
2000–2002	Baby Blues	Rex		
2000–2001	Clerks: The Animated Series	Axel Foley		
2000–2001	Clifford the Big Red Dog	Al		
2000	Buzz Lightyear of Star Command	Rocket Crocket, Smeego, Patron		
2001–2004	Justice League	John Stewart / Green Lantern, Justice Lord Green Lantern, Ed Reiss	Main role (43 episodes)	
2001	The Oblongs	Additional voices		
2001	The Legend of Tarzan	Basuli	3 episodes	
2001–2002	Invader Zim	Poop Dawg, The Letter M, Noogums / Shnooky, various voices		
2001–2005	The Proud Family	Michael, Coach Collins, additional voices	20 episodes	
2001–2007	Harvey Birdman, Attorney at Law	Black Vulcan, additional voices		
2001–2007	The Grim Adventures of Billy & Mandy	Hector Con Carne, Dracula, Judge Roy Splean		
2001–2004, 2017	Samurai Jack	Samurai Jack, additional voices		
2002	The Zeta Project	Schiz, Deputy	Episode: "Ro's Gift"	
2002–2004	Fillmore!	Nelson Kelloch, MC, Elderly Man, Snooty Student	2 episodes	
2002–2004	Ozzy & Drix	Osmosis "Ozzy" Jones, Vitamin A, Iron, Junior	Main role (26 episodes)	
2002–2007	Kim Possible	Vinnie		
2003–2006	The Adventures of Jimmy Neutron: Boy Genius	Bolbi Stroganofsky, various voices		
2003	Clifford's Puppy Days	Baker	Episode: "Lights, Camera, Action"	
2003–2004	Evil Con Carne	Hector Con Carne, additional voices	Main role Also writer (1 episode)	
2004	ChalkZone	Boris, Mean Santa		
2004	The Powerpuff Girls	Big John, Bouncer, Governor, Pesos Bill, Katanga	2 episodes	
2004	Maya & Miguel	Mr. Shue	Episode: "The Taming of Mr. Shue"	
2004	Dave the Barbarian	Various voices		
2004	Megas XLR	Rob, R.E.C.R., T-Bot		
2004	The Fairly OddParents	Mr. Phifer	Episode: "Fairy Friends & Neighbors!/Just the Two of Us!"	
2004–2005	What's New, Scooby-Doo?	Colonel Henry Thornwald/Shaman, Toddy Stickfigger, Cabbie	2 episodes	
2004–2006	Justice League Unlimited	John Stewart / Green Lantern, Steel, Static, S.T.R.I.P.E., Static, Angle Man, Bashari	18 episodes	
2004–2009	Foster's Home for Imaginary Friends	Wilt, Jackie Khones, additional voices		
2005	My Life as a Teenage Robot	Orion, Boy	Episode: "Teen Team Time"	
2005	Catscratch	Squeakus	Episode: "Bringin' Down the Mouse"	
2005–2007	The Life and Times of Juniper Lee	Marcus Connor, additional voices		
2005–2008	Robot Chicken	Ang Lee, Squirrel, Michael Jackson, Douglas		
2005–2008	My Gym Partner's a Monkey	Virgil "Bull" Sharkowski, additional voices		
2005–2006	Danny Phantom	Maurice Foley, Nerd, Old Man	2 episodes	
2005–2006	Loonatics Unleashed	Drake Sypher	3 episodes	
2006	The Batman	Maxie Zeus	Episode: "Thunder"	
2006	Totally Spies!	Boogie Gus	Episode: "I Hate the Eighties"	
2006	Avatar: The Last Airbender	Earth King Kuei	3 episodes	
2006–2007	Class of 3000	Philly Phil, various voices		
2006–2008	Drawn Together	Ray-Ray, UPS Man		
2007	Afro Samurai	Teen Afro, Brothers	English dub	
2007	Friday: The Animated Series	Smokey, Stanley, Joann		
2007	El Tigre: The Adventures of Manny Rivera	Raheem	Episode: "Party Monsters"	
2007	Codename: Kids Next Door	Numbuh Infinity	Episode: "Operation: T.R.E.A.T.Y."	
2007–2008	The Replacements	M.C. McC		
2007–2011	WordGirl	Yellow Shirted Guy		
2007–2009	Chowder	Ancho, Muffintops, Star Hat Man, Old Teller		
2008–2009	The Spectacular Spider-Man	Randy Robertson, Robbie Robertson, Ricochet, Homonculi		
2008–2009	Transformers: Animated	Jazz, Oil Slick, Omega Supreme (season 3), Jetstorm, Alpha Trion		
2008	Phineas and Ferb	Street Performer, Bango Ru Security Guard	Episode: "Got Game?/Comet Kermilian"	
2008	Underfist: Halloween Bash	Dracula, Bougersnatch	Television special	
2008–2014	Star Wars: The Clone Wars	Kit Fisto, Bail Organa, Orn Free Taa, various voices		
2009–2016	The Garfield Show	Additional voices		
2009	Wow! Wow! Wubbzy!	Jam-Jam James, Wally	Episode: "Hoop Dreamz"	
2009	Wolverine and the X-Men	Gambit, Bolivar Trask		
2009	The Goode Family	Maffew, Principal Whitmore, Joaquim, Solosolo		
2009	The Super Hero Squad Show	Captain Jamaica	Episode: "O, Captain, My Captain!"	
2009–2011	Glenn Martin, DDS	Erasmus, Jersey Pete, Grandpa Bert		
2010	Black Panther	T'Shan, additional voices		
2010	The Cartoonstitute	Sylvia	Episode: "3 Dog Band"	
2010	DC Super Friends	Cyborg, Gorilla Grodd	Television special	
2010	The Walking Dead	Rick Grimes, Shane Walsh, Reggie, various zombies	Motion comic	
2010	G.I. Joe: Renegades	Scrap-Iron, Doc	Episode: "Rage"	
2010–2012	The Avengers: Earth's Mightiest Heroes	J.A.R.V.I.S., Wonder Man, young Kang, additional voices		
2010–2019	Young Justice	Aquaman, Dubbilex, L-Ron, Reach Ambassador, B'arzz O'oomm/Green Beetle, Metron, Cal Durham, J'emm J'axx, Vor-Kil		
2011	Generator Rex	Fast-Talking Announcer	Episode: "Moonlighting"	
2011	Night of the Hurricane	Ollie Williams	Television special	
2011	Prep & Landing: Naughty vs. Nice	Crumbles	Television special	
2011–2022	Curious George	Dewey Freezum		
2012	Napoleon Dynamite	Various		
2012	The Cleveland Show	Chris Brown	Episode: "Mama Drama"	
2012	Black Dynamite	Muhammad Ali, Racer X	Episode: "The Race War or Big Black Cannon, Balls Run!"	
2012	Scooby-Doo! Mystery Incorporated	Melvin Keisterbaum	Episode: "Web of the Dreamweaver!"	
2012–2015	Ultimate Spider-Man	J.A.R.V.I.S., Cloak, Dormammu, Walter Cage, additional voices		
2012–2013	Kaijudo	Gabriel Wallace, Cyber Lord Finbarr, Carny, additional voices		
2012–2013	The High Fructose Adventures of Annoying Orange	Various		
2012–2017	Teenage Mutant Ninja Turtles	Baxter Stockman		
2013	Pound Puppies	Steven, Doc, President Bigman, Copter Pilot		
2013	Adventure Time	Hypno Priest, Mo-Mo	Episode: "The Vault"	
2013–2015	Regular Show	Cash Bankis, additional voices		
2013–2015	Turbo Fast	Smoove Move, additional voices		
2013–2023	American Dad!	Agent Crisp / various		
2014	Hulk and the Agents of S.M.A.S.H.	Dormammu	2 episodes	
2014	TripTank	Various voices		
2014	Mixels	Flurr, Chomly, Tentro		
2014	Ben 10: Omniverse	Jonesy, Bus Driver	Episode: "From Hedorium to Eternity"	
2014	The Simpsons	Hermes Conrad	Episode: "Simpsorama"	
2014–2016	BoJack Horseman	Judge		
2014–2017	Star Wars Rebels	Bail Organa		
2015–2016	Avengers Assemble	Doctor Spectrum, Dormammu, Baron Mordo, Nuke, Bashenga		
2015–2016	Sanjay and Craig	Various		
2015–2018	Pickle and Peanut	Yuk Yuk, additional voices		
2015	Be Cool, Scooby-Doo!	Zack, Cop at Pier, Officer, Old Man	2 episodes	
2015–2017	Clarence	Chelsea's Dad, Old Jeff, TV Narrator		
2016–2024	Kulipari	Arabanoo, Killara		
2016	Star vs. the Forces of Evil	Additional voices		
2016	Uncle Grandpa			
2016–2018	Mighty Magiswords	Noville, Sidney, various voices		
2016–2019	The Lion Guard	Shingo, Goigoi, additional voices		
2017–2020	The Loud House	Kotaro, Steve, Mr. Scully		
2017	Milo Murphy's Law	Marcus Underwood		
2017	SuperMansion	Hugh Dorvaks	Episode: "SuperMansion: Drag Me to Halloween"	
2017	Vampirina	Mr. Froufington, Mr. Walker	2 episodes	
2017–2018	Bunsen Is a Beast	Ken, additional voices		
2017–2018	Stretch Armstrong and the Flex Fighters	Ricardo's Dad, Policeman	4 episodes	
2017–2021	F Is for Family	Additional voices		
2017–2019	The Jellies!	Cornell Jelly		
2017–2025	Craig of the Creek	Bernard Williams, Ian, Paintball Mike, Granddad		
2018–2022	Pete the Cat	Burton Burrow, Bernie Burrow, Bill Burrow		
2018	Bunnicula	Captain	Episode: "Bunn on a Plane"	
2018	Welcome to the Wayne	5now4n	Episode: "Flutch"	
2018	Wacky Races	Hong Kong Phooey	Episode: "Hong Kong Screwy"; also writer (2 episodes)	
2018	Star Wars Resistance	Antiques Vendor, Stormtroopers		
2018–2020	The Flash	Rag Doll	3 episodes	
2019	Spider-Man	Mr. Salerno, Slyde	Episode: "The Road to Goblin War"	
2019–2021	DC Super Hero Girls	Barry Allen / Flash, Zatara, Carter Hall / Hawkman, additional voices		
2019–2021	Final Space	Additional voices		
2019–2021	Scooby-Doo and Guess Who?	Madds Markson, Demo Boss, Curator, Caddy, Golf Announcer, Golfer		
2019–2021	Bless the Harts	Various	Recurring role	
2019–2023	Disenchantment	Sky Gunderson, God, Asmodium		
2019–present	Harley Quinn	Lucius Fox, Black Manta, various voices		
2019–present	Rick and Morty	Additional voices		
2020–2024	Star Trek: Lower Decks	Admiral Alonzo Freeman, additional voices		
2020	The Casagrandes	Mr. Scully		
2020	Animaniacs	Reporter, No-Name	2 episodes	
2020	Spitting Image	LeBron James, Dwayne Johnson, Barack Obama, RuPaul, Kevin Hart, Kanye West, Jeff Bezos, Tiger Woods		
2020–2022	Central Park	Various		
2021	Devil May Care	Calvin, additional voices		
2021	Masters of the Universe: Revelation	He-Ro, Spikor		
2021	Kid Cosmic	Golden Swarm	2 episodes	
2021–2023	Star Wars: The Bad Batch	Orn Free Taa, Bail Organa		
2021–2022	The Great North	Louis Shaw	3 episodes	
2021–present	The Freak Brothers	Phil Switzer	Main role	
2022	Tales of the Jedi	Bail Organa		
2022	Dragon Age: Absolution	Roland	Main role	
2022	The Book of Boba Fett	Pyke boss, Klatoonian boss	2 episodes	
2022–2023	HouseBroken	Guernico	4 episodes	
2022–2025	Hamster & Gretel	Jack Ampersand / Professor Exclamation		
2023–present	Invincible	Salamander, Sidekick, Lucan, Walking Dread	3 episodes	
2023	Mulligan	Axatrax	10 episodes	
2023	Hailey's On It!	Gregory	Episode: "The Last Sand"	
2023	Skull Island	Sam, Hungry Mercenary		
2023–2024	Jessica's Big Little World	Bernard Williams, Turtle		
2024	Kite Man: Hell Yeah!	Black Manta, DeSaad, Detective Chimp, Martian Manhunter	4 episodes	
2025	Your Friendly Neighborhood Spider-Man	Mr. Lincoln	Episode: "Amazing Fantasy"	
2025	Jellystone!	Samurai Jack, Hector Con Carne, Wilt	Episode: "Crisis on Infinite Mirths"	
2026	Among Us	Brown		

==== Video games ====
List of voice performances in video games
Year	Title	Role	Notes	Source
1992	Power Factory Featuring C+C Music Factory	Steel Worker		
2001	Metal Gear Solid 2: Sons of Liberty	Vamp		
2003	Star Wars: Knights of the Old Republic	Gadon Thek		
2003	Jak II	Sig, Krimzon Guards		
2003	Terminator 3: Rise of the Machines	Additional voices		
2004	Samurai Jack: The Shadow of Aku	Samurai Jack, Mad Jack, Foreman, Archaeologist		
2004	Fight Night 2004	Fight Commentator	Uncredited	
2004	Ground Control II: Operation Exodus	Hervon Dreznor, Feedback Unit		
2004	Doom 3	Additional voices		
2004	Shark Tale	Oscar		
2004	Shark Tale: Fintastic Fun!	Oscar		
2004	Men of Valor	Dean Shepard, Black Marine #2		
2004	Jak 3	Sig, Count Veger		
2004	Tony Hawk's Underground 2	Additional voices		
2004	Vampire: The Masquerade – Bloodlines	Dennis, Fat Larry, Malcolm St. Martin, Skelter		
2004	Star Wars Knights of the Old Republic II: The Sith Lords	Captain Riiken, additional voices		
2005	Mercenaries: Playground of Destruction	Christopher Jacobs, News Correspondent #2		
2005	Madagascar	Marty		
2005	Madagascar Animal Trivia	Marty		
2005	Samurai Western	Donald, Thrower		
2005	Quake 4	Marines		
2005	Jak X: Combat Racing	G.T. Blitz, Sig, Mizo, Kaeden, Thugs		
2005	The Matrix: Path of Neo	Operator, Ballard, SWAT Soldier		
2005	True Crime: New York City	Additional voices		
2005	50 Cent: Bulletproof	Bugs		
2006	Daxter	Kaeden, Count Veger		
2006	The Grim Adventures of Billy & Mandy	Dracula		
2006	The Legend of Spyro: A New Beginning	Kane		
2006	Marvel: Ultimate Alliance	Black Panther, Uatu		
2006	Final Fantasy XII	Reddas		
2007	Spider-Man 3	Subway Worker #2, additional voices		
2007	Shrek the Third	Lancelot, Peasant #2, Attendant #1		
2007	Final Fantasy Tactics: The War of the Lions	Ramza Beoulve, additional voices		
2007	Shrek: Ogres & Dronkeys	Donkey		
2007	Shrek n' Roll	Donkey, Bandit		
2008	Condemned 2: Bloodshot	LeRue, Bum		
2008	Speed Racer: The Videogame	Snake Oiler		
2008	Metal Gear Solid 4: Guns of the Patriots	Vamp		
2008	Mercenaries 2: World in Flames	Christopher Jacobs		
2008	Saints Row 2	Mr. Sunshine		
2008	Madagascar: Escape 2 Africa	Marty		
2008	Star Wars: The Clone Wars – Lightsaber Duels	Kit Fisto		
2009	Cartoon Network Universe: FusionFall	Samurai Jack, Wilt, Dracula		
2009	Afro Samurai	Brother #1, Brother #3, Teen Afro Samurai		
2009	F.E.A.R. 2: Project Origin	Cedric "Top" Griffin		
2009	inFAMOUS	John White		
2009	[PROTOTYPE]	Dr. Bradley Rangland		
2009	Cloudy with a Chance of Meatballs	Cal Devereaux, additional voices		
2009	Star Wars: The Clone Wars – Republic Heroes	Kit Fisto		
2009	Madagascar Kartz	Marty, Maurice		
2009	Jak and Daxter: The Lost Frontier	Skyheed, Castaway		
2010	Darksiders	Vulgrim		
2010	Mass Effect 2	Mouse, Rukar		
2010	Iron Man 2	Additional War Machine Dialogue		
2010	Toy Story 3: The Video Game	Unspecified role		
2010	Monkey Island 2 Special Edition: LeChuck's Revenge	Captain Dread, Woody the Woodsman, Governor Phatt's Guard		
2011	Lego Star Wars III: The Clone Wars	Kit Fisto		
2011	Marvel Super Hero Squad Online	Luke Cage, Gambit, Nick Fury		
2011	Thor: God of Thunder	Heimdall		
2011	inFAMOUS 2	John White		
2011	Iron Brigade	Morris		
2011	Dead Island	Sam B.		
2011	X-Men: Destiny	Gambit, Forge		
2011	Super Star Kartz	Marty		
2011	Kinect Disneyland Adventures	Pirate #1		
2011	Rage	Additional voices		
2011	Star Wars: The Old Republic	Master Syo Bakarn, Sanju Pyne, additional voices		
2012	Diablo III	Additional voices		
2012	Madagascar 3: The Video Game	Marty		
2012	Kingdom Hearts 3D: Dream Drop Distance	Phoebus		
2012	Darksiders II	Vulgrim		
2013	Metal Gear Rising: Revengeance	Kevin Washington		
2013	Injustice: Gods Among Us	Aquaman, John Stewart / Green Lantern		
2013	Dead Island: Riptide	Sam B.		
2013	Far Cry 3: Blood Dragon	Spider		
2013	Saints Row IV	Mr. Sunshine		
2013	Lego Marvel Super Heroes	Blade, Gambit, War Machine		
2013	Teenage Mutant Ninja Turtles	Baxter Stockman		
2013	Young Justice: Legacy	Aquaman		
2014	Middle-earth: Shadow of Mordor	Ratbag		
2014	Teenage Mutant Ninja Turtles: Danger of the Ooze	Baxter Stockman		
2015	Mortal Kombat X	Kotal Kahn		
2015	Tales from the Borderlands	Cassius Leclemaine, additional voices		
2015	Minecraft: Story Mode	Gill		
2016	The Witness	Audio Log Voice		
2016	Teenage Mutant Ninja Turtles: Portal Power	Baxter Stockman		
2017	Kingdom Hearts HD 2.8 Final Chapter Prologue	Phoebus		
2017	Injustice 2	Aquaman, John Stewart / Green Lantern, Lucius Fox		
2017	Futurama: Worlds of Tomorrow	Hermes Conrad, additional voices	Uncredited	
2017	Fortnite	Ken		
2017	Marvel vs. Capcom: Infinite	Dormammu		
2017	Middle-earth: Shadow of War	Ratbag		
2017	Dota 2	Pangolier		
2018	Dissidia Final Fantasy NT	Ramza Beoulve		
2018	Marvel Powers United VR	Dormammu		
2018	Darksiders III	Vulgrim		
2019	Mortal Kombat 11	Kotal Kahn		
2019	Borderlands 2	Cassius Leclemaine	Commander Lilith and the Fight for Sanctuary DLC	
2019	Marvel Ultimate Alliance 3: The Black Order	Dormammu		
2019	Marvel Dimension of Heroes	Dormammu	Augmented reality game for mobile devices	
2019	Jumanji: The Video Game	Franklin 'Mouse' Finbar		
2019	Darksiders Genesis	Vulgrim		
2020	Samurai Jack: Battle Through Time	Samurai Jack		
2022	Lego Star Wars: The Skywalker Saga	Jar Jar Binks, Senator Bail Organa, Kit Fisto		
2023	Mortal Kombat 1	Geras, Steven		
2024	Teenage Mutant Ninja Turtles: Wrath of the Mutants	Baxter Stockman		
2024	Multiversus	Samurai Jack, Aquaman		
2026	Teenage Mutant Ninja Turtles: Empire City	Baxter Stockman		
2026	Invincible VS	Lucan		
TBA	The Adventures of Breadman	Breadman		

==== Web series ====
List of acting and voice performances in web series
Year	Title	Role	Notes
2007	Afterworld	Col. Nixon	
2015–2018	DC Super Hero Girls	Lucius Fox, Killer Moth, Will Magnus	
2015	Hunt the Truth	Deon Govender, Ray Kurzig, Thomas Wu	
2015	Kevin Pollak's Chat Show	Himself/Guest	Episode: "234"
2025	Atlantis Rocks	Earl	

==== Audio plays ====
List of voice performances in audio plays
Year	Title	Role	Notes
2018	The Hills of Baldwin		Audible Original
2015	Upgrade Soul		Audible Original
2022–present	Moriarty	Sherlock Holmes	Audible Original

=== Theatre ===
List of acting performances in stage shows
Year	Title	Role	Notes
2010–2011	The Pee-wee Herman Show	Cowboy Curtis	

== Awards and nominations ==
Awards and nominations
Year	Award	Category	Title	Result
2010	Streamy Award	Best Ensemble Cast in a Web Series	Back on Topps	Nominated
2012	Behind the Voice Actors Television Voice Acting Award	Best Vocal Ensemble in a Television Series	Futurama	Won
2012	Behind the Voice Actors People's Choice Voice Acting Award	Best Vocal Ensemble in a Television Series	Futurama	Won
2013	Behind the Voice Actors Television Voice Acting Award	Best Vocal Ensemble in a Television Series – Action/Drama	The Avengers: Earth's Mightiest Heroes	Nominated
2013	Behind the Voice Actors Television Voice Acting Award	Best Vocal Ensemble in a Television Series – Action/Drama	Young Justice	Won
2013	Behind the Voice Actors Television Voice Acting Award	Best Male Vocal Performance in a Television Series in a Supporting Role – Comedy/Musical	Futurama	Nominated
2013	Behind the Voice Actors Television Voice Acting Award	Best Vocal Ensemble in a Television Series – Comedy/Musical	Futurama	Won
2013	Behind the Voice Actors Video Game Voice Acting Award	Best Vocal Ensemble in a Video Game	Darksiders II	Nominated
2013	Behind the Voice Actors Voice Acting Award	Voice Actor of the Year		Nominated
2013	Behind the Voice Actors People's Choice Voice Acting Award	Best Vocal Ensemble in a Television Series – Comedy/Musical	Futurama	Won
2014	Webby Awards	Online Film & Video: Events & Live Webcasts	Futurama Live!	Nominated
2014	Behind the Voice Actors Television Voice Acting Award	Best Vocal Ensemble in a Television Series – Action/Drama	Teenage Mutant Ninja Turtles	Nominated
2014	Behind the Voice Actors Television Voice Acting Award	Best Vocal Ensemble in a Television Series – Action/Drama	Young Justice	Won
2014	Behind the Voice Actors Video Game Voice Acting Award	Best Vocal Ensemble in a Video Game	Injustice: Gods Among Us	Nominated
2015	NAVGTR Awards	Supporting Performance in a Drama	Middle-earth: Shadow of Mordor	Won
2015	Behind the Voice Actors Video Game Voice Acting Award	Best Vocal Ensemble in a Video Game	Middle-earth: Shadow of Mordor	Nominated
2016	Behind the Voice Actors Video Game Voice Acting Award	Best Vocal Ensemble in a Video Game	Tales from the Borderlands	Nominated
2017	Behind the Voice Actors Television Voice Acting Award	Best Vocal Ensemble in a New Television Series	Kulipari: An Army of Frogs	Nominated
2017	Behind the Voice Actors Television Voice Acting Award	Best Vocal Ensemble in a Television Series	Teenage Mutant Ninja Turtles	Won
2018	Behind the Voice Actors Television Voice Acting Award	Best Vocal Ensemble in a Television Series	Samurai Jack	Won
2018	Behind the Voice Actors Voice Acting Award	Voice Actor of the Year		Won
2018	Grand Jury Award	Best Supporting Actor	In This Gray Place	Nominated
