= Hunt the Truth =

Marketing campaign and audio series

Hunt the Truth is a fiction audio series and alternate reality game created as a promotional campaign for Halo 5: Guardians. The series was created by Ayzenberg Group and produced in partnership between Xbox, 343 Industries, and TwoFifteen McCann. The series starred Keegan-Michael Key and Mark Hamill.

== Background ==
The show was a promotional campaign for Halo 5: Guardians and included an alternate reality game. Halo previously did a promotional campaign for Halo 2 that also had an alternate reality game called I Love Bees. The show was done in a similar format to Serial; the creators researched what types of microphones NPR uses for their shows in preparation.

The show debuted on March 22, 2015 and released episodes weekly for 12 weeks. The show was created by Xbox's social agency Ayzenberg Group and produced in partnership between Xbox, 343 Industries, and TwoFifteen McCann. The show's creative director was Noah Eichen. The story was written by Noah Eichen, Andrew Volpe, and Ian Tornay. The series was released on Tumblr, iTunes, and SoundCloud.

The second season stars Mark Hamill. The second season debuted on September 22, 2015.

== Cast and characters ==
- Alan Tudyk as Noah Reibach
- Bruce Thomas as Ari Rezneck
- Cobie Smulders as Petra Janecek
- Janina Gavankar as Maya Sankar (aka "FERO")
- Jennifer Hale as Gabriella Dvørak
- Jerry Trainor as Michael Sullivan
- Keegan-Michael Key as Benjamin Giraud
- Kumail Nanjiani as Mshak Moradi
- Laura Bailey as Katrina
- Mark Hamill as Dasc Gevadim
- Mark Rolston as Andrew Del Rio
- Peter Serafinowicz as Black-Box
- Phil LaMarr as Simon Kensington (aka "Deon Govender"), Thomas Wu, and Ray Kurzig
- Rosa Salazar as Bostwick
- Stacy Keach as Franklin Mendez
- Steve Blum as Paul Gustivson (aka "Jakob Walker")
- Tamara Taylor as Ilsa Zane
- Tara Strong as Ellie Bloom
- Travis Willingham as Charles Kesler
- Troy Baker as Anthony Petrosky
- Vanessa Marshall as Chur'R-Zhal
- William Salyers

== Reception ==
The first season had over 6.7 million listeners and it reached the top 1% of podcasts on iTunes in 2015 according to Time Magazine. The show was included in the top shows on Apple iTunes in 2015.

=== Awards ===
Award	Date	Category	Recipient	Result	Ref.
Clio Awards	2015	Creative Content – Long Form	Ayzenberg	Bronze	
Clio Awards	2015	Streaming/Downloadable Content	Ayzenberg Group	Bronze	
Clio Awards	2015	Innovative	Xbox & Ayzenberg Group	Silver	
Clio Awards	2015	Integrated Campaign	twofifteenmccann	Gold	
Shorty Awards	2016	GAMES	Ayzenberg Group, Xbox/343 Industries	Won	
Shorty Awards	2016	TUMBLR PRESENCE	Ayzenberg Group, Xbox/343 Industries	Silver Honor	
Webby Awards	2016	Advertising & Media: Social Media Campaign	Ayzenberg	Honoree	
Webby Awards	2016	Advertising & Media: Integrated Campaign	twofifteenmccann	Honoree	
The One Club	2016	Consumer – Branded Podcast / Branded Podcast	Ayzenberg / Pasadena	Silver Pencil	
Game Connection's Marketing Awards	2015	Best Social Media Campaign	Ayzenberg Group / Microsoft / Xbox	Won	

== See also ==
- The Callisto Protocol: Helix Station
- Splinter Cell: Firewall
