= Keegan-Michael Key =

American actor and comedian (born 1971)

- Key in 2026
- Born: March 22, 1971 (age 55); Southfield, Michigan, U.S.
- Other name: Keegan Key
- Education: University of Detroit Mercy (BFA); Pennsylvania State University (MFA)
- Occupations: Actor; comedian; producer; writer; singer
- Years active: 1999–present
- Spouses: Cynthia Blaise (m. 1998; div. 2017); Elle Pugliese (m. 2018)
- Relatives: Dwayne McDuffie (half-brother)

Keegan-Michael Key (born March 22, 1971) is an American actor, comedian, producer, writer, and singer. He and Jordan Peele co-created and co-starred in the sketch series Key & Peele (2012–2015) for which he received one Primetime Emmy Award from ten nominations. He also acted in the sketch series Mad TV (2004–2009), sitcom Playing House (2014–2017), the comedy series Friends from College (2017–2019) and the series Reboot (2022). He also appeared alongside Peele in the first season of the series Fargo in 2014, and had a recurring role on Parks and Recreation from 2013 to 2015. Key later starred in the musical comedy series Schmigadoon! (2021–2023).

Key has had supporting roles in several films, including Horrible Bosses 2 (2014), Pitch Perfect 2 (2015), Don't Think Twice (2016), Dolemite Is My Name (2019), The Prom (2020), and Wonka (2023). He has provided voice-work for The Lego Movie (2014), the subsequent films of the Hotel Transylvania franchise (2015–2022), Storks, The Angry Birds Movie (both 2016), The Star (2017), Chip 'n' Dale: Rescue Rangers, Wendell & Wild (both 2022), Migration (2023), IF, Transformers One (both in 2024) and Buddy (2026). He has also voiced roles in Disney's Toy Story 4 (2019) and the live-action remakes of The Lion King (2019), and Pinocchio (2022).

In 2015, he appeared at the White House Correspondents' Dinner as the Key & Peele character Luther, President Barack Obama's anger translator. Key and Peele produced and starred in the 2016 action-comedy film Keanu. In 2017, Key made his Broadway debut in the comic play Meteor Shower. He hosted The Planet's Funniest Animals on Animal Planet (2005–2008), and hosted Game On! in 2020. He has provided the voice of Toad in The Super Mario Bros. Movie (2023) and The Super Mario Galaxy Movie (2026).

== Early life ==
Key was born on March 22, 1971, in Southfield, Michigan, a suburb of Detroit. His father Leroy McDuffie, is African-American. His mother, Carrie Herr, is of Polish and Flemish descent. He was adopted at a young age by a couple from Detroit, Michael Key and Patricia Walsh, who were both social workers. Like his birth parents, his adoptive parents were a black man and a white woman. Through his biological father, Key had two half-brothers, one of whom was comic book writer Dwayne McDuffie. Key discovered the existence of his half-siblings only after both had died.

Raised Catholic, Key attended the University of Detroit Mercy, a Catholic college, as an undergraduate, earning a Bachelor of Fine Arts degree in theater in 1993, followed by a Master of Fine Arts in theater at Pennsylvania State University in 1996. While at the University of Detroit Mercy, he was a member of Phi Kappa Theta.

== Career ==
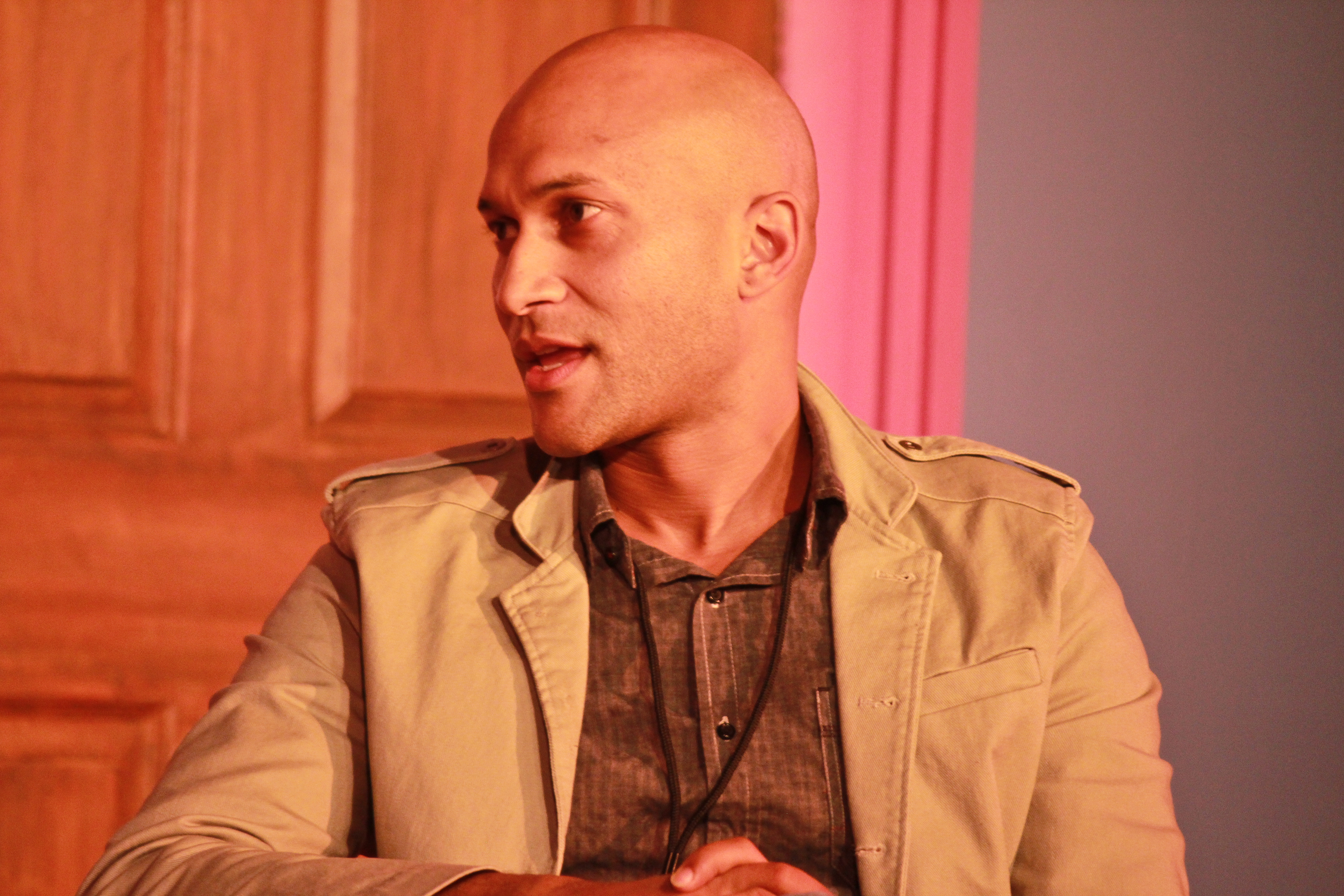
Key in 2012

=== Mad TV ===
In 2004, Key joined the cast of Mad TV midway into the ninth season. He and Jordan Peele were cast against each other, but both ended up being picked after demonstrating great comedic chemistry. Key played many characters on the show. One of his most famous characters is "Coach Hines", a high school sports coach who frequently disrupts and threatens students and faculty members. On the penultimate episode of Mad TV, Hines revealed that he is the long-lost heir to the Heinz Ketchup company and only became a Catholic school coach to help delinquent teenagers like Yamanashi (Bobby Lee). During seasons 9 and 10, Key appeared as "Dr. Funkenstein" in blaxploitation parodies, with Peele playing the monster. Key also portrayed various guests on Real **********ing Talk like the strong African Rollo Johnson and blind victim Stevie Wonder Washington. He often went "backstage" as Eugene Struthers, an ecstatic water-or-flower delivery man who accosts celebrities. There was also "Jovan Muskatelle", a shirtless man with a jheri curl and a shower cap who interrupts live news broadcasts by a reporter (always played by Ike Barinholtz), annoying him with rapid-fire accounts of events that have happened frequently exclaiming "It was crazy as hell!" Celebrities that Key impersonated on the show include Ludacris, Snoop Dogg, Al Roker, Terrell Owens, Tyler Perry, Eddie Murphy, Tyson Beckford, Barack Obama, John Legend, Kobe Bryant, and Robin Antin.

=== Key & Peele ===
Key and his Mad TV castmate Jordan Peele starred in their own Comedy Central sketch series Key & Peele, which began airing on January 31, 2012, and ran for five seasons until September 9, 2015.

Key was introduced by President Barack Obama at the 2015 White House Correspondents' Dinner as Luther, Obama's Anger Translator, one of Key's characters from Key & Peele.

=== Friends from College ===
Key played the most prominent male character, Ethan Turner, on the Netflix ensemble comedy Friends from College, about a group of Harvard University graduates and friends now in their late 30s living in New York City. He plays an award-winning fiction writer who is being encouraged to start writing for young adult fiction audiences.

=== Other work ===
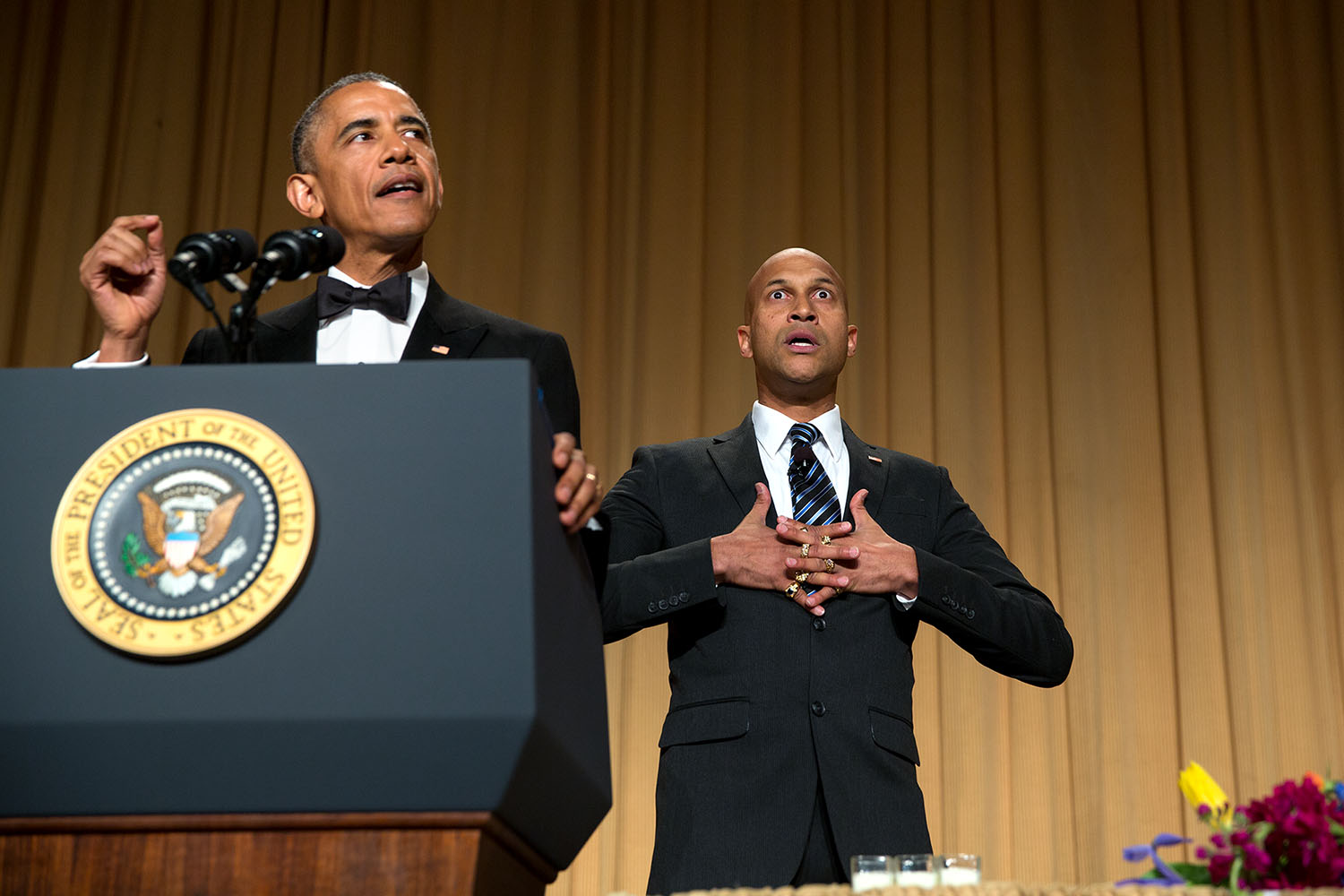
Barack Obama and Keegan-Michael Key at White House Correspondents' Association Dinner 2015

Key was one of the founders of Hamtramck, Michigan's Planet Ant Theatre, and was a member of the Second City Detroit's mainstage cast before joining the Second City e.t.c. theater in Chicago. Key co-founded the Detroit Creativity Project along with Beth Hagenlocker, Marc Evan Jackson, Margaret Edwartowski, and Larry Joe Campbell. The Detroit Creativity Project teaches students in Detroit improvization as a way to improve their communication skills. Key performed with The 313, an improv group formed with other members of Second City Hollywood that appears around the country. The 313 is made up primarily of former Detroit residents and is named for Detroit's area code.

He made a cameo in "Weird Al" Yankovic's video "White & Nerdy" with Peele. Key also hosted Animal Planet's The Planet's Funniest Animals. In 2009, Key hosted GSN's "Big Saturday Night", and has co-starred in Gary Unmarried on CBS. Key was a panelist on the NPR comedy quiz show Wait Wait, Don't Tell Me... on March 27 and July 24, 2010. Key has been in several episodes of Reno 911! as the "Hypothetical Criminal".

Key and Peele were featured on the cover and in a series of full-page comic photos illustrating The New York Times Magazine article "Is Giving the Secret to Getting Ahead?" on March 31, 2013. A live-action video version was also featured on the Times' website. Key co-stars in the horror-comedy Hell Baby. Key is one of the rotating "fourth chair" performers in the 2013 revival of Whose Line Is It Anyway?.

In addition to Key & Peele, he also co-starred in the USA Network comedy series Playing House, which began airing in April 2014.

Together with Peele, Key played an FBI agent in a recurring role in the 2014 FX crime drama Fargo.

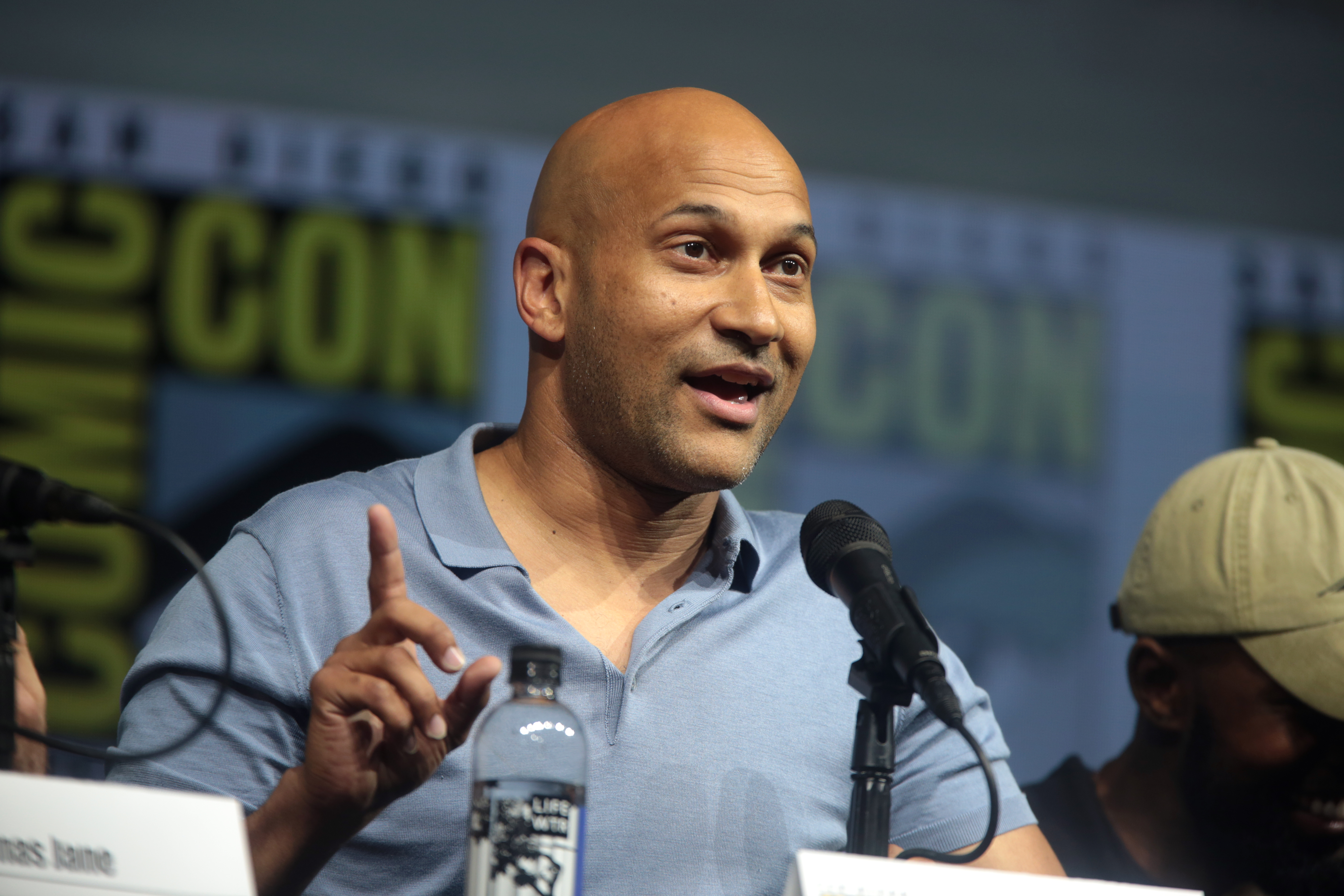
Key at the 2018 San Diego Comic-Con

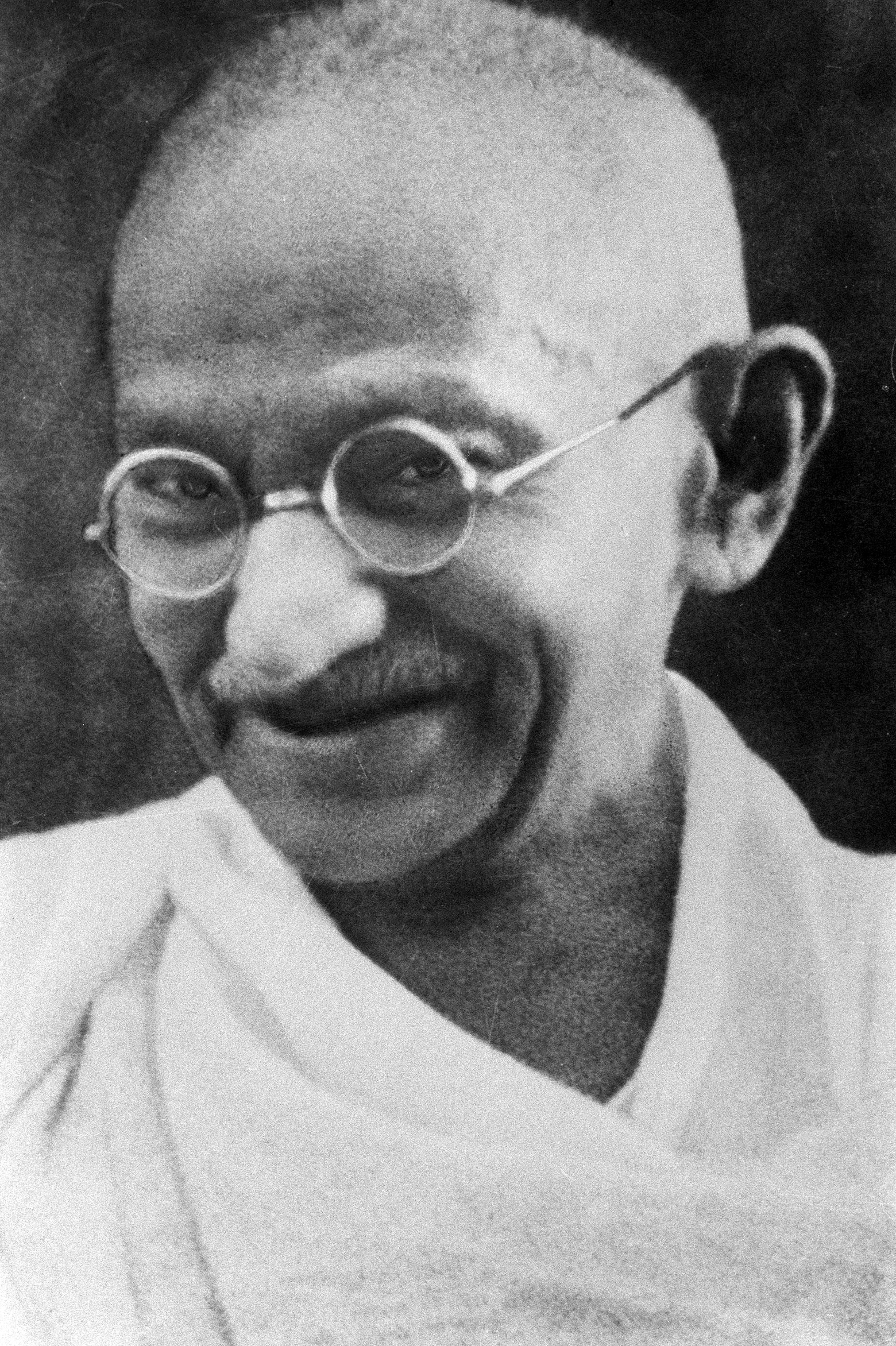
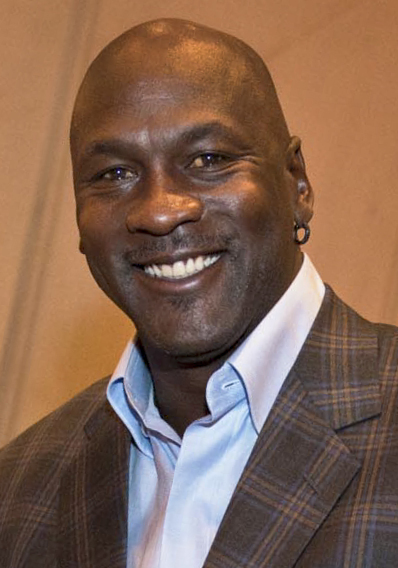
Key has portrayed and rapped as Indian civil rights leader Mahatma Gandhi (left) and American basketball player Michael Jordan (right) for Epic Rap Battles of History.

Key and Peele starred in an episode of Epic Rap Battles of History, with Key playing Mahatma Gandhi and Peele playing Martin Luther King Jr. The pair returned to Epic Rap Battles of History with the "Muhammad Ali versus Michael Jordan" battle, with Key portraying Jordan.

Key was involved in audio episodes for the marketing campaign, "Hunt the Truth" on the website for the video game Halo 5: Guardians, voicing a fictional journalist and war photographer named Benjamin Giraud, who investigates the Master Chief's background.

Key has had roles in numerous films, including 2014's Horrible Bosses 2, Let's Be Cops and the animated The Lego Movie, as well as Pitch Perfect 2, Tomorrowland, and Wonka in 2023.

Key is one of several hosts of the podcast Historically Black by American Public Media and The Washington Post.

Key voices the character Murray the Mummy in Hotel Transylvania 2, Hotel Transylvania 3: Summer Vacation and Hotel Transylvania: Transformania. The character was originally voiced by rapper CeeLo Green in the first movie.

In the summer of 2017 Key returned to the theater after what he characterized as a "19-year detour into sketch comedy" for a production of Hamlet at New York's Public Theater, playing Horatio opposite Oscar Isaac in the title role. Key, who is a Shakespearean-trained actor, fulfilled his lifelong dream to play Horatio and received rave reviews for his performance. The Hollywood Reporter's David Rooney noted that Key's comedic skills were on full display, "...but his ease with the verse and stirring sensitivity [was] a revelation."

Key voice acted in The Star, the animated film based on the Nativity of Jesus. He later went on to voice Ducky in Toy Story 4 and Ed in The Lion King. Key voiced "Honest John" Worthington Foulfellow in the live-action film adaptation of Disney's Pinocchio, which stars Tom Hanks, Cynthia Erivo and Luke Evans, as well as Toad in The Super Mario Bros. Movie, with Chris Pratt, Jack Black, Anya Taylor-Joy, Charlie Day and Seth Rogen, and a scarlet macaw Delroy in Migration both from Illumination. In 2024, Key voiced B-127 / Bumblebee in the animated prequel film Transformers One, sharing cast with Chris Hemsworth, Scarlett Johansson, Brian Tyree Henry and Jon Hamm.

In 2017, Key made his Broadway debut in Steve Martin's comedy Meteor Shower. His hosting stint on Saturday Night Live on May 15, 2021, marked the first time a MADtv cast member has hosted SNL.

Key hosted the science show Brain Games on National Geographic for its eighth season.

On May 14, 2020, he hosted an online event by the Jazz Foundation of America to support its emergency fund for COVID-19.

In 2026, Key reprised the voice of Toad in The Super Mario Galaxy Movie. He also provided the voice of the titular character in the comedy-horror film Buddy.

== Personal life ==
Key was married to actress and dialect coach Cynthia Blaise from 1998 until 2017. They were legally separated in November 2015, with Key filing for divorce the following month. He married producer and director Elisa "Elle" Pugliese in New York City on June 8, 2018.

Key is a Christian and has practiced Buddhism, Catholicism, and Evangelicalism in the past. Being biracial has been a source of comedic material for Key, who told Terry Gross in an interview for NPR, "I think the reason Jordan and I became actors is because we did a fair amount of code-switching growing up and still do."

Key is a football (soccer) fan and a supporter of English Premier League club Liverpool and the Belgian national team because of his roots there. He is a big fan of Penn State football (his alma mater) and he has been known to regularly impersonate Penn State's former head coach James Franklin because of their similar physical appearance. He is also a fan of the NFL's Detroit Lions.

== Philanthropy ==
Key has worked with the Young Storytellers Foundation as an actor for their annual fundraiser alongside Max Greenfield, Jack Black and Judy Greer.

== Filmography ==
=== Film ===
Key
†	Denotes works that have not yet been released

Year	Title	Role	Notes
1999	Get the Hell Out of Hamtown	J	
2000	Garage: A Rock Saga	TV Studio Manager	
2003	Uncle Nino	Airport Stranger	
2004	Mr. 3000	Reporter	
2006	Alleyball	Curt Braunschweib	
2006	Grounds Zero	Arch	Short film
2007	Sucker For Shelley	Michael	Short film
2008	Yoga Matt	Matt	Short film
2008	Role Models	Duane	
2008	Land of Arabia	Dwayne	Short film
2010	Welcome to the Jungle Gym	Mike McKenzie	Short film
2010	Due Date	New Father	
2011	Just Go with It	Ernesto	
2011	Bucky Larson: Born to Be a Star	Guinness Man	
2012	Wanderlust	Marcys Flunkie	
2013	Hell Baby	F'Resnel	
2013	Afternoon Delight	Bo	
2014	The Lego Movie	Frank the Foreman	Voice Cameo
2014	Teacher of the Year	Ronald Douche	
2014	Let's Be Cops	Pupa	
2014	Horrible Bosses 2	Mike	
2015	Pitch Perfect 2	Sammy	
2015	Welcome to Happiness	Proctor	
2015	Tomorrowland	Hugo Gernsback	
2015	Vacation	Jack Peterson	
2015	Hotel Transylvania 2	Murray the Mummy	Voice
2015	Freaks of Nature	Mr. Keller	
2016	Keanu	Clarence "Shark Tank" Goobril / Smoke Dresden	Also producer
2016	The Angry Birds Movie	Judge Peckinpah	Voice
2016	Don't Think Twice	Jack	
2016	Storks	Alpha Wolf	Voice
2016	Why Him?	Gustav	
2017	Get Out	NCAA Prospect	Uncredited cameo
2017	Win It All	Gene	
2017	The Disaster Artist	Himself	Cameo
2017	The Star	Dave	Voice
2018	Hotel Transylvania 3: Summer Vacation	Murray	Voice
2018	The Predator	Coyle	
2019	Toy Story 4	Ducky	Voice
2019	The Lion King	Ed	
2019	Dolemite Is My Name	Jerry Jones	
2019	Playing with Fire	Mark Rogers	
2020	All the Bright Places	Embry	
2020	Jingle Jangle: A Christmas Journey	Gustafson	
2020	The Prom	Tom Hawkins	
2022	Hotel Transylvania: Transformania	Murray	Voice
2022	The Bubble	Sean Knox / Colt Rockwell	
2022	Chip 'n Dale: Rescue Rangers	Bjornson the Cheesemonger / Frog co-worker	Voice
2022	Pinocchio	Honest John	Voice
2022	Wendell & Wild	Wendell	Voice
2023	The Super Mario Bros. Movie	Toad	Voice
2023	Wonka	Police Chief	
2023	Migration	Delroy	Voice
2024	IF	Slime	Voice
2024	Transformers One	B-127	Voice
2024	Dear Santa	Dr. Finklman	
2025	Play Dirty	Ed Mackey	
2026	The Super Mario Galaxy Movie	Toad	Voice
2026	Buddy	Buddy the Unicorn	Voice
2027	Romy and Michele 2	TBA	Filming

=== Television ===
Year	Title	Role	Notes
2001	ER	Witkowski	Episode: "Quo Vadis?"
2004	I'm With Her	Orderly	Episode: "Poison Ivy"
2004–2009	Mad TV	Various	107 episodes; also writer
2005–2008	The Planet's Funniest Animals	Host	30 episodes
2007	Frangela	DeShawn	Television film
2008	Chocolate News	Woodsy	1 episode
2008–2009	Reno 911!	Hypothetical Criminal	8 episodes
2009–2010	Gary Unmarried	Curtis	17 episodes
2010	Sons of Tucson	Eric	Episode: "Pilot"
2010–2015	Childrens Hospital	Cop / Captain Tripper	3 episodes
2011	A Series of Unfortunate People	Ted	Episode: "Family Secret"
2011	Love Bites	Drew	2 episodes
2011	Wilfred	Dick Barbian	Episode: "Identity"
2011	The League	Steve / Carmenjello	Episode: "Carmenjello"
2012–2015	Key & Peele	Himself / Various	54 episodes; also co-creator, writer and executive producer
2013	How I Met Your Mother	Calvin	Episode: "Something New"
2013	Super Fun Night	Slade	Episode: "Pilot"
2013–2021	Whose Line is it Anyway?	Himself / Fourth Seater	11 episodes
2014	The Middle	Reverend Deveaux	Episode: "Hungry Games"
2014	Inside Comedy	Himself	Episode: "Key and Peele and Garry Marshall"
2014	Hell's Kitchen	Himself	Guest diner; Season 13 Episode 14: "5 Chefs Compete"
2014	Fargo	FBI Special Agent Bill Budge	4 episodes
2014–2015	Parks and Recreation	Joe	5 episodes
2014–2015	BoJack Horseman	Sebastian St. Clair	Voice; 4 episodes
2014, 2016	Robot Chicken	Various	Voices; 2 episodes
2014–2016	Bob's Burgers	Various	Voices; 5 episodes
2014–2017	Playing House	Mark Rodriguez	21 episodes
2015	The Hotwives	Ace	7 episodes
2015	TripTank	King Lhoga	Voice; Episode: "Dirty Talk"
2015	It's Always Sunny in Philadelphia	Grant Anderson	Episode: "The Gang Goes on Family Fight"
2015	White House Correspondents' Dinner	Luther	Television special
2015	W/ Bob & David	Traffic Cop	Episode: "Episode 3"
2015, 2019, 2026	Rick and Morty	Fourth Dimensional Being	Voice; 3 episodes
2015–2019	SuperMansion	American Ranger / Sgt. Agony / Blue Menace	Voices; 38 episodes
2016	Modern Family	Tom Delaney	Episode: "Playdates"
2016	Angie Tribeca	Helmut Fröntbüt	Episode: "Ferret Royale"
2016	The Muppets	Himself	Episode: "Swine Song"
2016	House of Lies	Devin Townsend	Episode: "Johari Window"
2016	American Dad!	E-Money	Voice; Episode: "Criss-Cross Applesauce: The Ballad of Billy Jesusworth"
2016	Mack & Moxy	Admirable Keegan	Episode: "Buckle, Buckle, Seatbelts and Chuckle"
2016–2017	Archer	Detective Diedrich / Floyd	Voices; 6 episodes
2016, 2018	Last Week Tonight with John Oliver	Crazy Jimmy / Faux BitConnect Carlos	2 episodes
2017	The Simpsons	Jazzy James	Voice; Episode: "The Great Phatsby"
2017	Son of Zorn	Grobos the Great	Voice; Episode: "All Hail Son of Zorn"
2017	Detroiters	Smilin' Jack	Episode: "Smilin' Jack"
2017	Samurai Jack	Da' Samurai	Voice; Episode: "XCVII"
2017–2019	Friends from College	Ethan Turner	16 episodes
2018	Impulse	Michael Pearce	2 episodes
2018	Sesame Street	Himself	2 episodes
2019	Veep	Jordan Thomas Jr.	Episode: "South Carolina"
2019	The Dark Crystal: Age of Resistance	The Ritual-Master (skekZok)	Voice; 9 episodes
2019	No Activity	Charles Brock	2 episodes
2019–2022	Green Eggs and Ham	Narrator	23 episodes
2020	Brain Games	Host	8 episodes
2020	Game On!	Host	8 episodes
2020	Home Movie: The Princess Bride	Inigo Montoya	Episode: "Chapter Eight: Ultimate Suffering"
2021	Saturday Night Live	Host	Episode: "Keegan-Michael Key/Olivia Rodrigo"
2021–2023	Schmigadoon!	Josh Skinner	12 episodes
2022	The Pentaverate	Dr. Hobart Clark	3 episodes
2022	Reboot	Reed Sterling	Main cast
2024	Abbott Elementary	Superintendent John Reynolds	3 episodes
2024	Elsbeth	Ashton Hayes	Episode: "Something Blue"
2025	Only Murders in the Building	Mayor Tillman	Recurring guest star
2026	Life, Larry and the Pursuit of Unhappiness	Davy Crockett	Episode 6 ("Buzz")

=== Stage ===
Year	Title	Role	Notes
2004	The People vs. Friar Laurence	Romeo	Chicago, Second City
2017	Hamlet	Horatio	Off-Broadway
2017–2018	Meteor Shower	Gerald	Broadway

=== Video games ===
Year	Title	Voice role	Notes
2003	NFL Blitz Pro	Commentary / Additional Voices	
2018	Hotel Transylvania 3: Monsters Overboard	Murray the Mummy	

=== Music videos ===
Year	Title	Role	Artist
2006	"White & Nerdy"	Black Gangster	"Weird Al" Yankovic

=== Web series ===
Year	Title	Role	Notes
2013	Epic Rap Battles of History	Mahatma Gandhi	"Gandhi vs. Martin Luther King Jr."
2014	Epic Rap Battles of History	Michael Jordan	"Michael Jordan vs. Muhammad Ali"

=== Podcasts ===
Year	Title	Role	Notes
2020	13 Days of Halloween	The Caretaker	Season 1
2021	The History of Sketch Comedy	Host	

=== Books ===
Year	Title	Authors	Notes
2023	The History of Sketch Comedy: A Journey through the Art and Craft of Humor	Keegan-Michael Key and Elle Key	Based on the podcast with new contributions from Mel Brooks, Julia Louis-Dreyfus, Mike Myers, John Oliver, Tracy Morgan, Carol Burnett, Jordan Peele and more; as well as illustrations and photos.

== Awards and nominations ==
Year	Award	Category	Work	Result
2013	Writers Guild of America Award	Best Comedy/Variety (Including Talk) – Series	Key & Peele	Nominated
2013	Peabody Award		Key & Peele	Won
2014	NAACP Image Award	Outstanding Variety–Series or Special	Key & Peele	Nominated
2014	American Comedy Award	Best Alternative Comedy Series	Key & Peele	Won
2014	American Comedy Award	Best Comedy Actor–TV	Key & Peele	Nominated
2014	American Comedy Award	Best Comedy Writing–TV	Key & Peele	Nominated
2014	Primetime Emmy Award	Outstanding Writing for a Variety Series	Key & Peele	Nominated
2015	People's Choice Award	Favorite Sketch Comedy TV Show	Key & Peele	Nominated
2015	NAACP Image Award	Outstanding Comedy Series	Key & Peele	Nominated
2015	NAACP Image Award	Outstanding Actor in a Comedy Series	Key & Peele	Nominated
2015	Primetime Emmy Award	Outstanding Variety Sketch Series	Key & Peele	Nominated
2015	Primetime Emmy Award	Outstanding Supporting Actor in a Comedy Series	Key & Peele	Nominated
2015	Primetime Emmy Award	Outstanding Writing for a Variety Series	Key & Peele	Nominated
2015	Primetime Emmy Award	Outstanding Writing for a Variety Special	Key and Peele Super Bowl Special	Nominated
2015	Primetime Emmy Award	Outstanding Short-Format Live-Action Entertainment Program	Key & Peele Presents Van and Mike: The Ascension	Nominated
2016	NAACP Image Award	Outstanding Comedy Series	Key & Peele	Nominated
2016	NAACP Image Award	Outstanding Writing in a Comedy Series	Key & Peele	Nominated
2016	Screen Actors Guild Award	Outstanding Performance by an Ensemble in a Comedy Series	Key & Peele	Nominated
2016	Writers Guild of America Award	Best Comedy/Variety – Sketch Series	Key & Peele	Nominated
2016	Primetime Emmy Award	Outstanding Variety Sketch Series	Key & Peele	Won
2016	Primetime Emmy Award	Outstanding Supporting Actor in a Comedy Series	Key & Peele	Nominated
2016	Primetime Emmy Award	Outstanding Writing for a Variety Series	Key & Peele	Nominated
2016	Primetime Emmy Award	Outstanding Character Voice-Over Performance	SuperMansion	Nominated
