= Kumail Nanjiani =

Pakistani and American comedian and actor (born 1978)

- کمیل نانجیانی
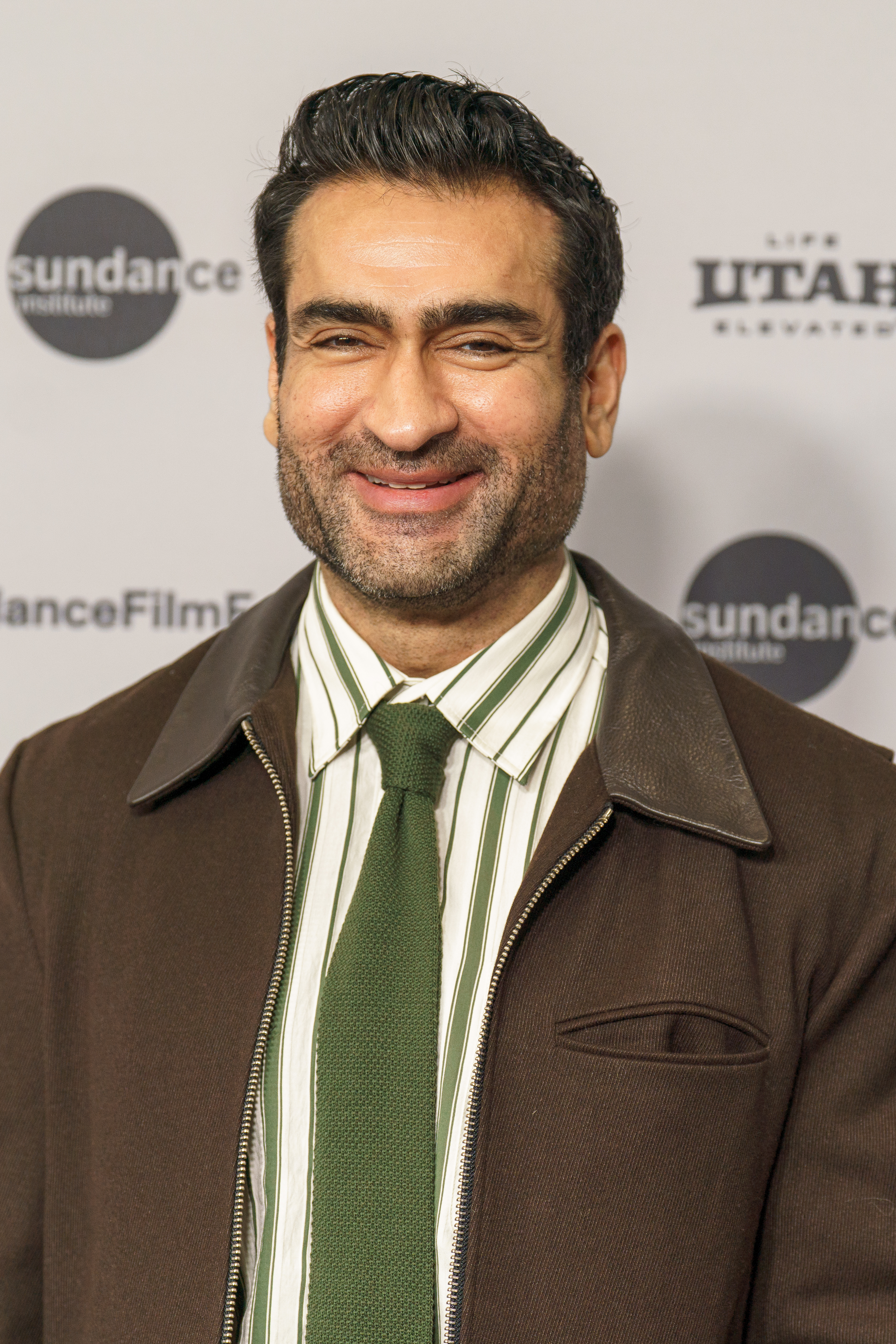
- Nanjiani in 2026
- Born: Kumail Ali Nanjiani; May 2, 1978 (age 48); Karachi, Sindh, Pakistan
- Citizenship: Pakistan; United States
- Education: Grinnell College (BA)
- Spouse: Emily V. Gordon (m. 2007)
- Relatives: Shereen Nanjiani (second cousin)

Comedy career
- Years active: 2007–present
- Medium: Stand-up; film; television
- Languages: English, Hindi-Urdu

Kumail Ali Nanjiani (Note: /kʊˈmeɪl ˌnɑːndʒiˈɑːni/; Sindhi: ڪميل علي نانجياڻي; Urdu: کمیل علی نانجیانی) (born May 2, 1978) is a Pakistani and American stand-up comedian, actor, producer, and screenwriter. His accolades include a Screen Actors Guild Award, in addition to nominations for an Academy Award, Golden Globe Award, and two Emmy Awards. In 2018, Time magazine named Nanjiani one of the 100 most influential people in the world.

Nanjiani's breakthrough role came with his role as Dinesh in the HBO comedy series Silicon Valley (2014–2019). He is also known for his performances in the TNT series Franklin & Bash, the Adult Swim series Newsreaders, the comedy series Portlandia, the Disney+ miniseries Obi-Wan Kenobi, the series The Boys, and the Peacock series Poker Face. His voice acting roles include Prismo on the animated series Adventure Time. He also co-hosted the Comedy Central show The Meltdown with Jonah and Kumail. In 2019, he was nominated for the Primetime Emmy Award for Outstanding Guest Actor in a Drama Series for his performance in The Twilight Zone. In 2023, he was nominated for the Primetime Emmy Award for Outstanding Lead Actor in a Limited or Anthology Series or Movie for his work in the miniseries Welcome to Chippendales.

Nanjiani achieved wider recognition for co-writing and starring in the romantic comedy film The Big Sick (2017), which earned him and his wife Emily V. Gordon a nomination for the Academy Award for Best Original Screenplay. He also starred as Kingo in the Marvel Cinematic Universe (MCU) superhero film Eternals, which he reprised the role of in the animated anthology series What If...?

== Early life and education ==
Nanjiani grew up in Karachi, the first of two sons born to a Sindhi, Shia Muslim couple Shabana and Aijaz Nanjiani. The BBC Radio presenter Shereen Nanjiani is his second cousin. During his childhood, he lived in Karachi and attended St. Michael's Convent School for his O-Levels and graduated from Karachi Grammar School to complete his A-Levels, where he was the class-fellow of Sharmeen Obaid Chinoy. At 18, he moved to the U.S. and enrolled at Grinnell College in Grinnell, Iowa, where he graduated in 2001 with a double major in computer science and philosophy. He then moved to Chicago and began performing stand-up comedy at open-mic events.

== Career ==
In 2007, Nanjiani wrote and staged an original autobiographical one-man show in Chicago, New York, and Los Angeles. After moving to New York, he continued to perform stand-up and made occasional appearances on shows including Michael & Michael Have Issues and The Colbert Report. In 2009, he performed at the Just for Laughs comedy festival. In 2011, Nanjiani and X-Play staffer Ali Baker began hosting a video game-themed podcast, titled The Indoor Kids. In late August the same year, Baker left the show and Nanjiani began hosting with his wife, Emily V. Gordon. Until other commitments took over, he appeared regularly on Dan Harmon's podcast Harmontown, where he played Dungeons & Dragons with Harmon as a character named Chris de Burgh. He played a delivery man in the 2013 film The Kings of Summer. In addition to guest-starring in comedy shows like Portlandia, Nanjiani was featured in a supporting role in the TNT series Franklin & Bash. He played the role of Pindar Singh, an agoraphobic fiction nerd working for the title characters.

Nanjiani guest-starred on HBO's Veep as a statistician. He had the recurring roles of Amir Larussa on Newsreaders and Prismo on Adventure Time. His Comedy Central special Beta Male aired in July 2013. In late June 2013, Comedy Central announced the pickup of The Meltdown with Jonah and Kumail, hosted by Jonah Ray and Nanjiani. The show, featuring Nerd Melt comedy regulars and various comedians, began airing in July 2014. In April 2014, he began playing the character Dinesh in the HBO sitcom Silicon Valley. He voiced Reggie in the video game The Walking Dead: Season Two. In July 2014, Nanjiani hosted a weekly podcast titled The X-Files Files, dedicated to discussion and reminiscences about The X-Files. Each episode features Nanjiani and a guest, including former The X-Files writers, producers, actors and directors, in light-hearted banter about one or two episodes of the series. On July 30, 2014, Nanjiani appeared on Ken Reid's TV Guidance Counselor Podcast.

In 2015, Nanjiani guest-starred in the Broad City episode "In Heat". Starting on March 22, 2015, he provided his voice for the character of Mshak Moradi in the Hunt the Truth audio drama, part of the marketing campaign for Halo 5: Guardians. On May 5, 2015, he appeared on the Inside Amy Schumer episode "12 Angry Men Inside Amy Schumer", a parody of 12 Angry Men, as one of the jurors. In July 2015, Nanjiani provided guest voices on Aqua Teen Hunger Force and Penn Zero: Part-Time Hero.

In 2017, Nanjiani starred in the romantic comedy film The Big Sick, which he wrote with Gordon. The film is about their relationship, with Nanjiani playing himself and Zoe Kazan playing Gordon (renamed Emily Gardner). The film was one of the most acclaimed of 2017, and was chosen by American Film Institute as one of the top 10 films of the year and nominated for the Academy Award for Best Original Screenplay. The film was also the third-highest-grossing independent film released in 2017, grossing over $40 million.

In 2018, he was invited to the actors and writers branch of the Academy of Motion Picture Arts and Sciences.

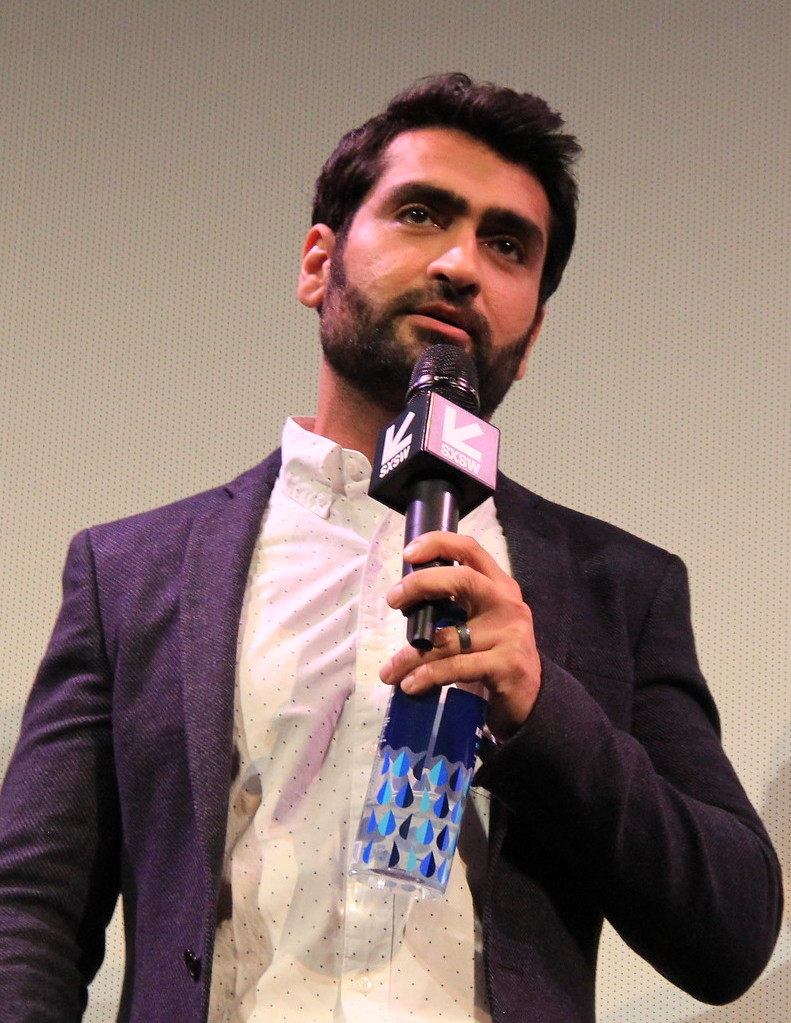
Nanjiani at South by Southwest, 2019

In 2019, Nanjiani headlined the first episode of the CBS All Access revival of the anthology series The Twilight Zone. For his role on The Twilight Zone, Nanjiani received a nomination for the Primetime Emmy Award for Outstanding Guest Actor in a Drama Series. In film, Nanjiani voiced the alien Pawny in Men in Black International, which was released on June 14. Nanjiani stated, "I play an alien so you won't see my face but you'll hear my voice, I'm a little alien frog/lizard... thing." Nanjiani also stars in the action comedy film Stuber, released on July 12. In 2020, Nanjiani lent his voice to Plimpton, an ostrich, in the adventure comedy film Dolittle. He also wrote for and produced the Apple TV+ anthology series Little America, which premiered in January 2020. The series is based on the story collection of the same name from Epic Magazine which focuses on stories from immigrants. To promote the series, Nanjiani appeared at the Apple Event of March 25, 2019. Nanjiani starred with Issa Rae in the comedy-chase film The Lovebirds, directed by Michael Showalter, produced by Paramount Pictures, and released by Netflix in May 2020.

In March 2020, during the COVID-19 pandemic, Nanjiani and his wife Emily Gordon launched a podcast, Staying In with Emily and Kumail. The series chronicles their experiences as a couple forced to live in isolation during the global pandemic. The podcast has been widely acclaimed in the media, as a welcome respite during a period of high anxiety. GQ described it as "consistently endearing, actually useful, and often hilarious." New York magazine relates that "all advice is shared via cute and charming banter."

He starred in the Marvel Cinematic Universe film Eternals, as Kingo, which was released on November 5, 2021. Nanjiani received widespread attention and went viral after sharing pictures of his body transformation for the shooting of Eternals in 2019. Speaking with GQ, he noted how he has since become less comfortable speaking about his body due to the intense amount of attention it received online. In March 2021, Nanjiani was announced as cast in an upcoming Obi-Wan Kenobi series for Disney+. In February 2020, Nanjiani signed on to star in The Independent, a political thriller to be directed by Amy Rice, though he ultimately dropped out of the role.

In 2022, Nanjiani starred in the Hulu miniseries Welcome to Chippendales in the lead role of Somen "Steve" Banerjee, the hitman-hiring founder of the Chippendales dance troupe.

On March 24, 2023, it was confirmed that Nanjiani had joined the cast of Ghostbusters: Frozen Empire. He appeared in the film, released on March 22 of the following year, as the character Nadeem Razmaadi / Firemaster.

In 2024, Nanjiani and his wife Emily V. Gordon formed the production company Winter Coat Films.

In June 2025, it was announced that Nanjiani would perform at Belly Laughs, a new comedy and food festival in Los Angeles. On July 16, it was announced that Nanjiani would play Mary's Husband in the Broadway play Oh, Mary!. His run began on August 4, 2025. Also in 2025, Nanjiani released the stand-up comedy special Night Thoughts on Hulu. In January 2026, Nanjiani was announced as a contestant on the twenty-first series of Taskmaster.

== Personal life ==
In 2007, Nanjiani married writer-producer Emily V. Gordon at Chicago City Hall. She was the producer of The Meltdown with Jonah and Kumail. As of 2022, they reside in Larchmont, Los Angeles.

Nanjiani was raised in a Shiite family and now identifies as an atheist. He is also an avid video gamer.

In 2018, in the wake of president Donald Trump's anti-immigration policies, Nanjiani tweeted: "It took me 15 years to get my Green Card. Getting any kind of visa is difficult. Becoming a citizen is extremely difficult and rare." In a 2025 discussion with American comedian Hasan Minhaj, Nanjiani spoke about being a naturalized citizen of the United States. At the 41st Independent Spirit Awards in February 2026, Nanjiani joined a group of celebrities, including Tessa Thompson, Natasha Rothwell, and his wife Emily V. Gordon, in wearing "ICE Out" pins in protest of aggressive immigration enforcement under the second Trump administration. The demonstrations came in the wake of the prominent killings of Renée Good and Alex Pretti in Minneapolis by ICE agents, which sparked widespread national outrage over the agency's tactics.

Nanjiani announced he would donate proceeds of his November 2023 Largo show to Doctors Without Borders working in the Gaza war.

== Filmography ==
=== Film ===
Year	Title	Role	Notes
2010	Life as We Know It	Simon	
2012	The Five-Year Engagement	Pakistani Chef	
2013	The Kings of Summer	Gary the Delivery Guy	
2013	Hell Baby	Cable Guy	
2013	Bad Milo	Bobbi	
2014	The Last of the Great Romantics	George the Counter Guy	
2014	Sex Tape	Punit	
2015	Loaded	Reza	
2015	Hot Tub Time Machine 2	Brad	
2015	Addicted to Fresno	Damon	
2015	Hello, My Name Is Doris	Nasir	
2015	Hell and Back	Dave the Demon	Voice role
2015	Goosebumps	Foreman	
2016	Central Intelligence	Jared the Airport Security Guard	Cameo
2016	Mike and Dave Need Wedding Dates	Keanu	
2016	Brother Nature	Riggleman	
2016	Flock of Dudes	Ro	
2016	The Late Bloomer	Rich	
2017	The Big Sick	Kumail Nanjiani	Also writer and executive producer
2017	Fist Fight	Officer Mehar	
2017	A Happening of Monumental Proportions	HR Rep Perry	
2017	Funny: The Documentary	Himself	
2017	The Lego Ninjago Movie	Jay	Voice role
2018	Duck Butter	Jake	
2019	Stuber	Stu Prasad	
2019	Men in Black: International	Pawny	Voice role
2020	Dolittle	Plimpton	Voice role
2020	The Lovebirds	Jibran	Also executive producer
2021	Eternals	Kingo	
2023	Migration	Mack	Voice role
2024	Destroy All Neighbors	Smelting Refinery Guard	
2024	Ghostbusters: Frozen Empire	Nadeem Razmaadi	
2025	Animal Farm	Marth	
2025	Driver's Ed	Mr. Rivers	
2025	Ella McCay	Trooper Nash	
2026	See You When I See You	Adeel	Also producer
2026	Over Your Dead Body	Hollywood Dan	Uncredited
2026	The Breadwinner	Peyton Mahar	
2026	The Wrong Girls	GG	Voice role
2027	The Comeback King †	TBA	Post-production
TBA	Green Bank †	TBA	Post-production

=== Television ===
Year	Title	Role	Notes
2008	Saturday Night Live	Indian Reporter	Episode: "James Franco/Kings of Leon"; uncredited
2009	The Colbert Report	Various characters	2 episodes
2009	Michael & Michael Have Issues	Kumail	Main role
2009	100 Most Shocking Music Moments	Panelist	5 episodes
2010	Ugly Americans	Neilando Patel	Voice role; episode: "Treegasm"
2011	Traffic Light	Paul	Episode: "Where the Heart Is"
2011	CollegeHumor Originals	Vendor	Episode: "Batman Chooses His Voice"
2011	Googy	Dwayne	Main role
2011–2014	Franklin & Bash	Pindar Singh	Main role (seasons 1–3), guest role (season 4)
2011–2018	Portlandia	Various characters	Recurring role; 13 episodes
2012–2016	Adventure Time	Prismo	Recurring voice role; 7 episodes
2013–2015	Newsreaders	Amir Larussa	Correspondent; 11 episodes
2013	Burning Love	Zakir	Main role (seasons 2–3)
2013	Veep	Statistician	Episode: "Midterms"
2013	Drunk History	Lakota Chief	Episode: "Nashville"
2013	Ghost Ghirls	Mr. Mattoo	Episode: "I Believe in Mira-ghouls"
2013	Kumail Nanjiani: Beta Male	Himself	Stand-up special
2014	Math Bites	Showoff Guy	Episode: "Math Heads: Do Math in Your Head"
2014	The Pete Holmes Show	Dhalsim	Episode: "Erin Hamlin and Kate Hansen"
2014	TripTank	Dick Genie	Voice role; 4 episodes
2014	Garfunkel and Oates	Jordan	Episode: "Hair Swap"
2014	Key & Peele	College Kid #1	Episode: "Scariest Movie Ever"
2014–2015	Community	Custodian Lapari	2 episodes
2014–2016	The Meltdown with Jonah and Kumail	Himself	Host; also executive producer
2014–2019	Silicon Valley	Dinesh Chugtai	Main role
2014–2025	Bob's Burgers	Skip Marooch	Voice role; 3 episodes
2015	Broad City	Benny Calitri	Episode: "In Heat"
2015	Archer	Farooq Ashkani	Voice role; episode: "Sitting"
2015	Inside Amy Schumer	Juror #11	Episode: "12 Angry Men Inside Amy Schumer"
2015	Scheer-RL	Mariah Carey	Episode: "Mariah Carey"
2015	Penn Zero: Part-Time Hero	Cuteling Mayor	Voice role; episode: "The Ripple Effect"
2015	Aqua Teen Hunger Force	Frylock's bees	Voice role; episode: "Sweet C"
2015	The Grinder	Prosecutor Leonard	2 episodes
2016	The X-Files	Pasha	Episode: "Mulder and Scully Meet the Were-Monster"
2016	Animals	Rusty	Voice role; episode: "Dogs."
2016	31st Independent Spirit Awards	Himself (host)	Television special
2016–2017	HarmonQuest	Eddie Lizard	2 episodes
2016–2022	Bee and PuppyCat: Lazy In Space	Howell	Voice role; 2 episodes
2017	Saturday Night Live	Himself (host)	Episode: "Kumail Nanjiani/Pink"
2019	The Twilight Zone	Samir Wassan	Episode: "The Comedian"
2019–2021	Bless the Harts	Jesus Christ	Main voice role
2020–2022	Little America	—	Executive producer and writer
2020	Death to 2020	Bark Multiverse	Television special
2021	Big Mouth	Himself	Voice role; episode: "No Nut November"
2022	Murderville	Himself	Episode: "Most Likely to Commit Murder"
2022	The Simpsons	Theo	Voice role; episode: "You Won't Believe What This Episode Is About..."
2022	The Boys Presents: Diabolical	Vik	Voice role; episode: "Boyd in 3D"
2022	Obi-Wan Kenobi	Haja Estree	Miniseries; 3 episodes
2022	Bee and PuppyCat	Howell Wizard	Voice role; 3 episodes
2022–2023	Welcome to Chippendales	Somen "Steve" Banerjee	Miniseries; main cast; also executive producer
2022–2026	The Boys	Himself	2 episodes
2023	History of the World, Part II	Vātsyāyana	Episode: "I"
2023	The Eric Andre Show	Himself	Episode: "Anti-Weed"
2024	Krapopolis	Spartan Army Leader	Voice role; episode: "Contagion"
2024	Only Murders in the Building	Rudy "Christmas Guy" Thurber	7 episodes
2024	What If...?	Kingo	Voice role; episode: "What If... Agatha Went to Hollywood?"
2025	Poker Face	Joseph "Gator Joe" Pilson	Episode: "The Taste of Human Blood"
2025	Haunted Hotel	Leader Todd	Voice role; episode: “The Acolytes of Abaddon”
2025	Adventure Time: Fionna and Cake	Prismo	Voice role; 3 episodes
2025	Kumail Nanjiani: Night Thoughts	Himself	Stand-up special
2025	Fallout	Paladin Xander Harkness	2 episodes
2026	Taskmaster	Himself	Series 21, 10 episodes
2026	Deli Boys	Danyal	Season 2
TBA	The White Lotus †	TBA	Season 4

=== Video games ===
Year	Title	Voice role	Notes
2013	The Walking Dead: Season Two	Reggie	
2017	Mass Effect: Andromeda	Jarun Tann	
2017	Middle-earth: Shadow of War	Nemesis Orcs	
2018	Adventure Time: Pirates of the Enchiridion	Prismo, Gnome, Marauder	
TBA	Intergalactic: The Heretic Prophet	Colin Graves	

=== Web ===
Year	Title	Role	Notes
2008	CH Originals	College student	"Honest College Ad"
2009	Jake and Amir	Kumail	4 episodes
2015	Hunt the Truth	Mshak Moradi	
2013–2017	Harmontown	Himself	
2017	Game Grumps	Himself	1 episode; on the same episode as Thomas Middleditch
2017	Movie Fights	Himself	1 episode; on the same episode as Paul Scheer
2019	Achievement Hunter	Himself	1 episode
2019	Gay of Thrones	Himself	1 episode; "Gay Of Thrones S8 E4 Recap"
2019	Hot Ones	Himself	1 episode
2020	Reunited Apart	Himself	1 episode; "Ghostbusters"
2025	Brooklyn Coffee Shop	Himself	1 episode
2026	Game Changer	Himself	1 episode; "Last Talent Standing"

=== Theater ===
Year	Title	Role	Notes
2025	Oh, Mary!	Mary's Husband	Lyceum Theatre

== Awards and nominations ==
Year	Association	Category	Project	Result	Ref.
2017	Academy Awards	Best Original Screenplay	The Big Sick	Nominated	
2017	Critics' Choice Movie Awards	Best Original Screenplay	The Big Sick	Nominated	
2017	Critics' Choice Movie Awards	Best Actor in a Comedy	The Big Sick	Nominated	
2017	Detroit Film Critics Society	Best Screenplay	The Big Sick	Nominated	
2017	Detroit Film Critics Society	Best Ensemble	The Big Sick	Nominated	
2017	Kanbar Award for Storytelling		The Big Sick	Won	
2017	Gotham Awards	Best Screenplay	The Big Sick	Nominated	
2017	Washington D.C. Area Film Critics Association	Best Original Screenplay	The Big Sick	Nominated	
2017	Independent Spirit Awards	Best First Screenplay	The Big Sick	Won	
2017	NAACP Image Awards	Outstanding Writing in a Motion Picture	The Big Sick	Nominated	
2017	Screen Actors Guild Award	Outstanding Cast in a Motion Picture	The Big Sick	Nominated	
2017	Critics' Choice Television Awards	Best Supporting Actor in a Comedy Series	Silicon Valley	Nominated	
2017	San Diego International Film Festival	Auteur Award	Self	Won	
2019	Primetime Emmy Awards	Outstanding Guest Actor in a Drama Series	The Twilight Zone	Nominated	
2021	NAACP Image Awards	Outstanding Writing in a Comedy Series	Little America (episode: "The Rock")	Nominated	
2021	Independent Spirit Awards	Best New Scripted Series	Little America	Nominated	
2021	British Academy Television Awards	International Programme	Little America	Nominated	
2023	Primetime Emmy Awards	Outstanding Lead Actor in a Limited or Anthology Series or Movie	Welcome to Chippendales	Nominated	
2025	Screen Actors Guild Award	Outstanding Performance by an Ensemble in a Comedy Series	Only Murders in the Building	Won	
2026	Golden Globes Awards	Best Performance in Stand-Up Comedy on Television	Kumail Nanjiani: Night Thoughts	Nominated	

== See also ==
- List of atheists in film, radio, television and theater
